= Toyota, Aichi =

Toyota 豊田市
- Core city
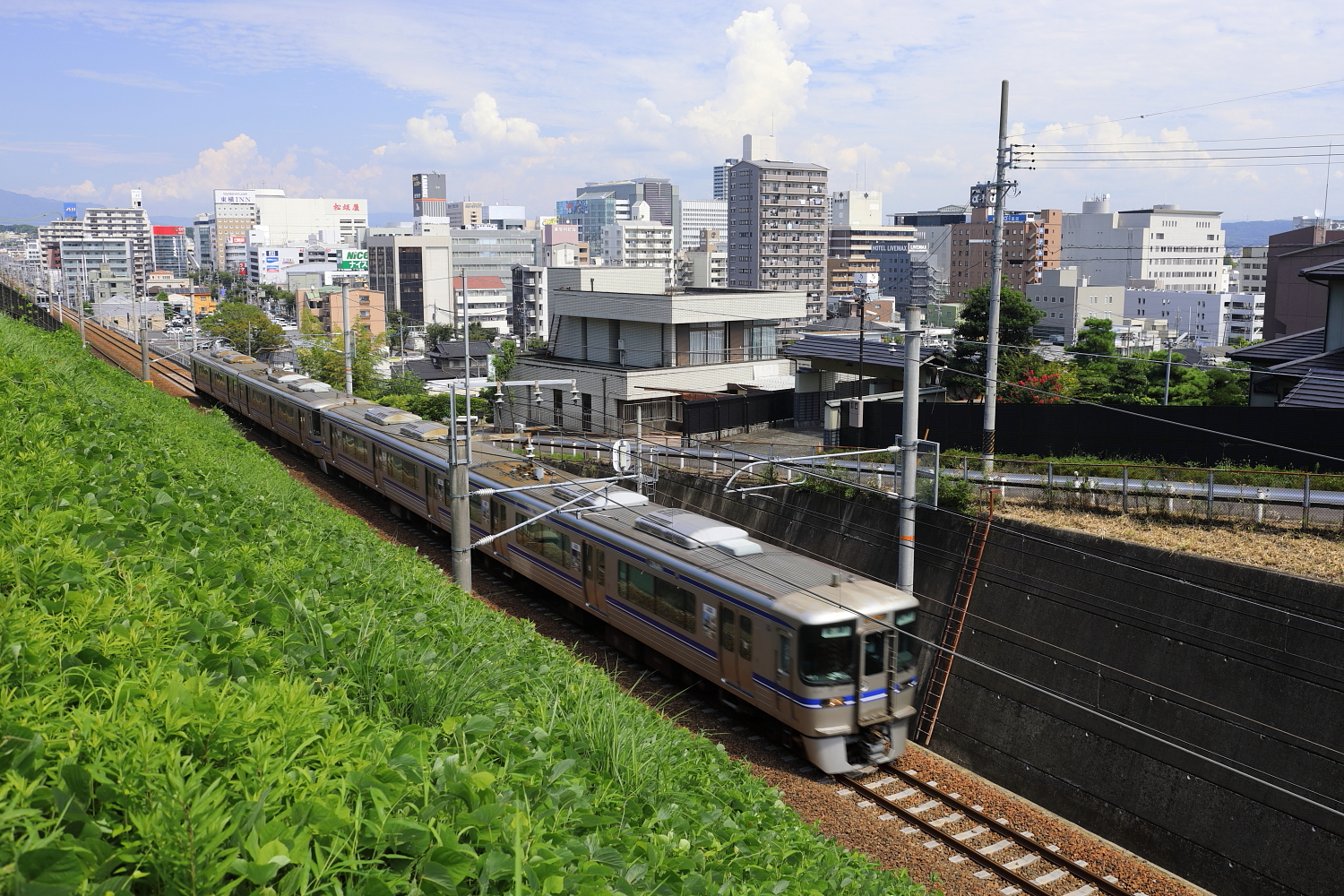
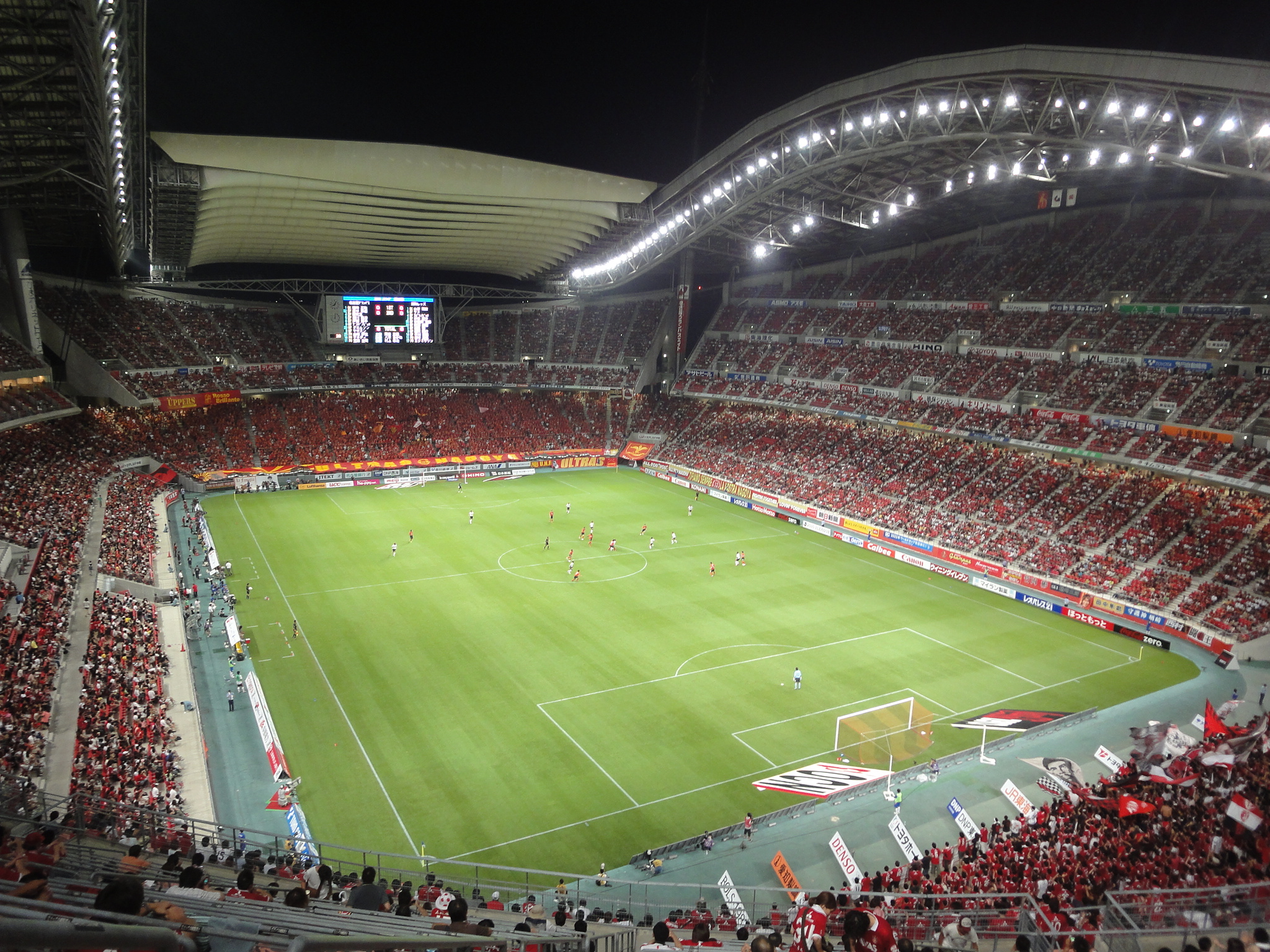
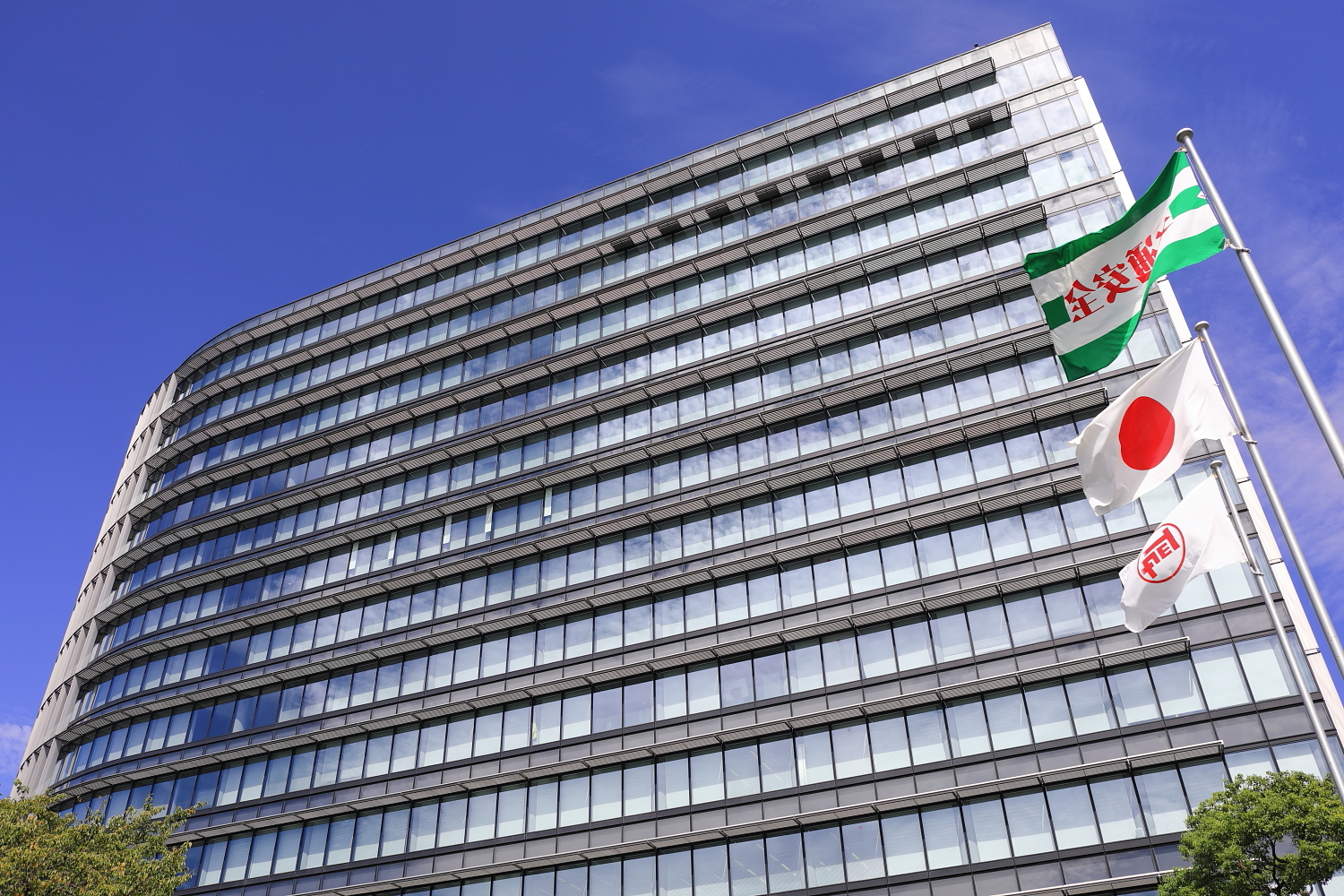
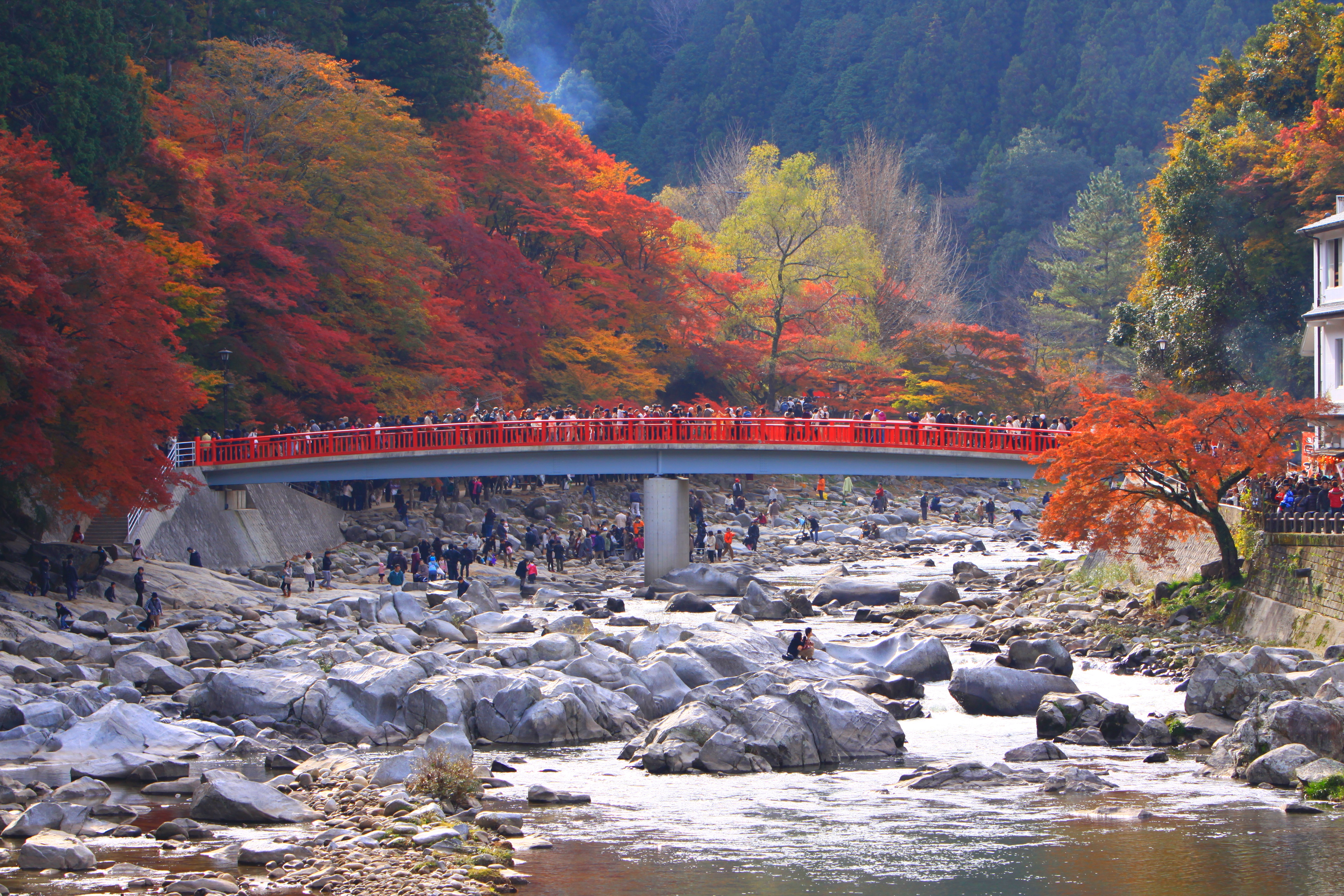
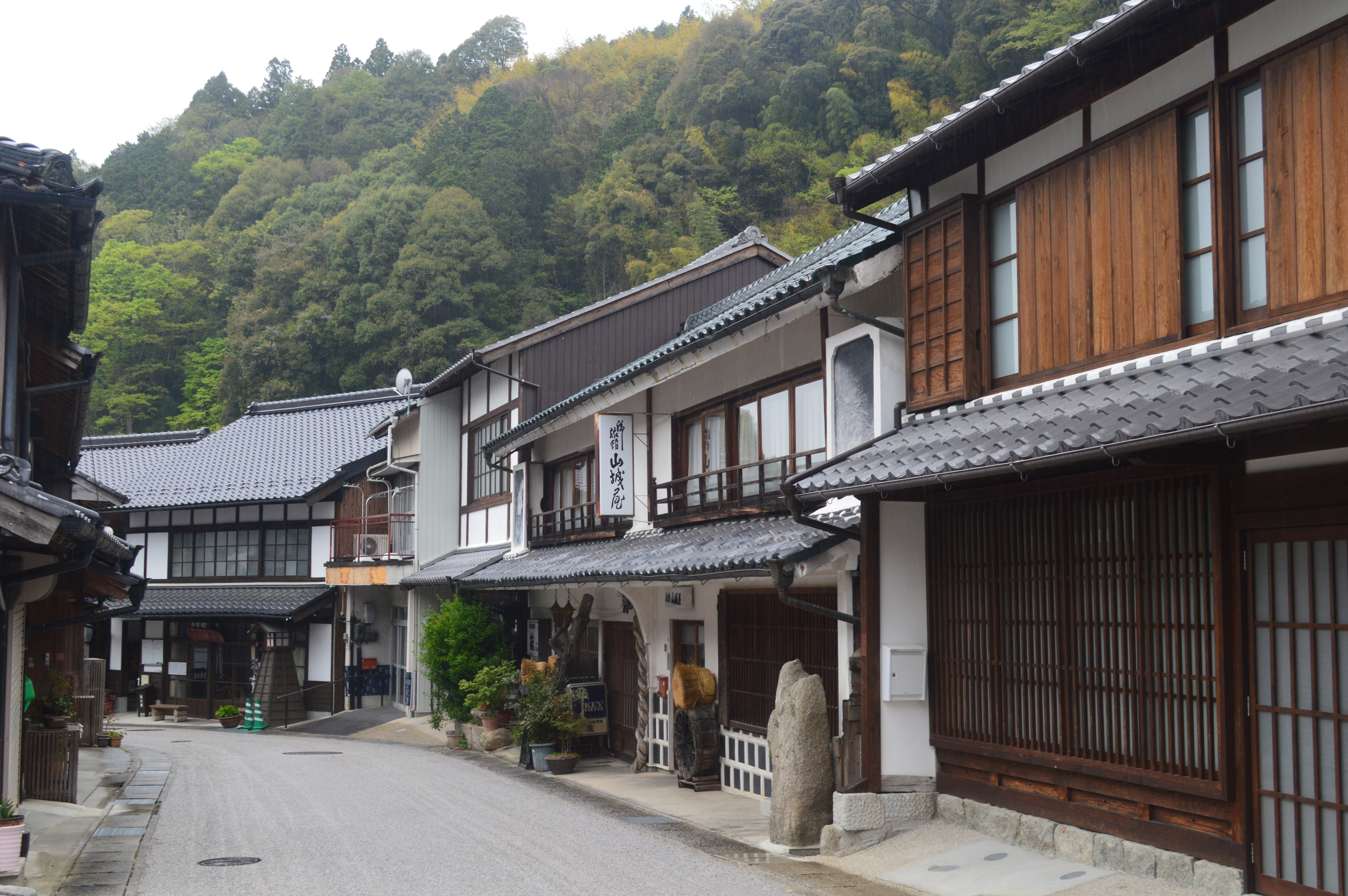
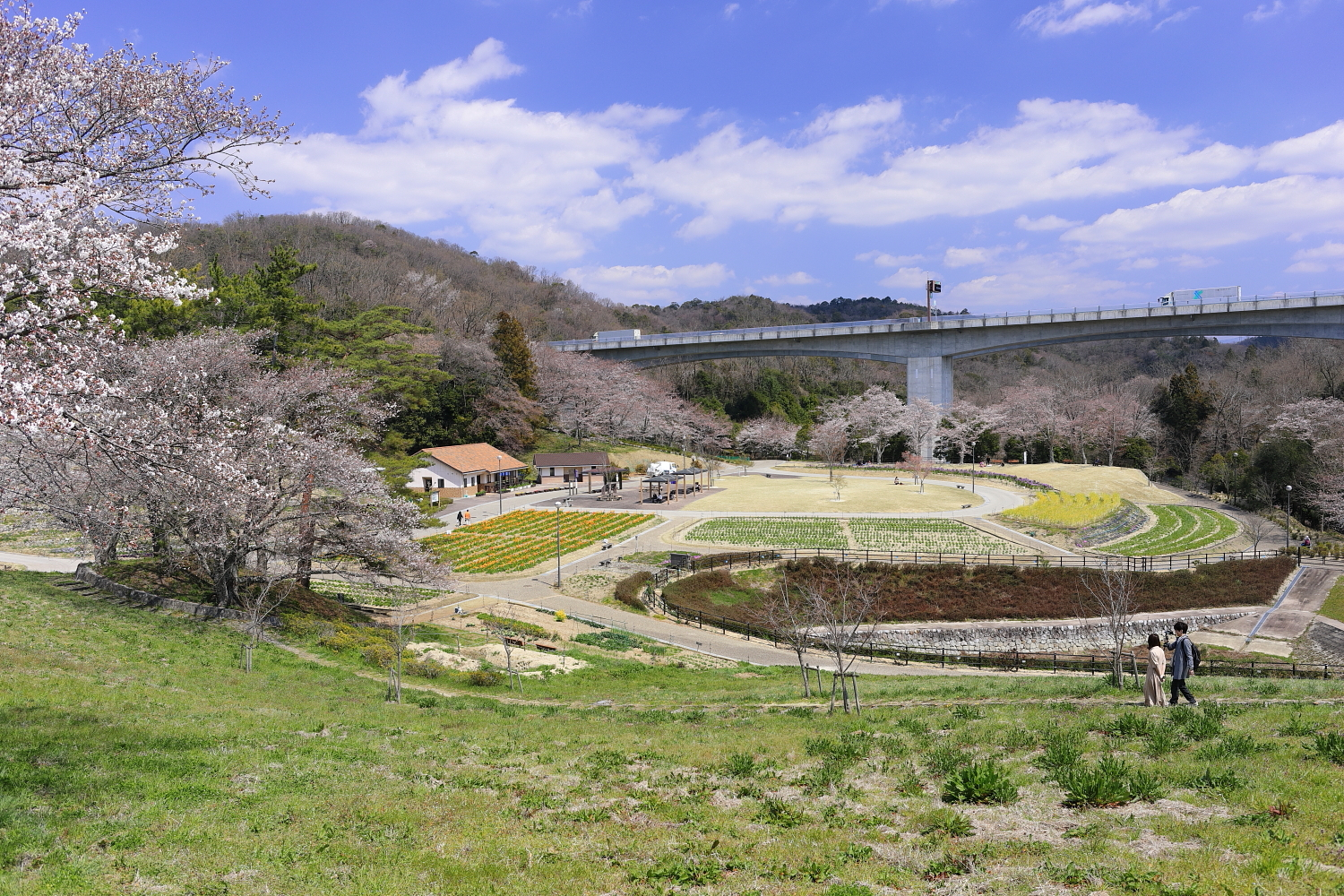
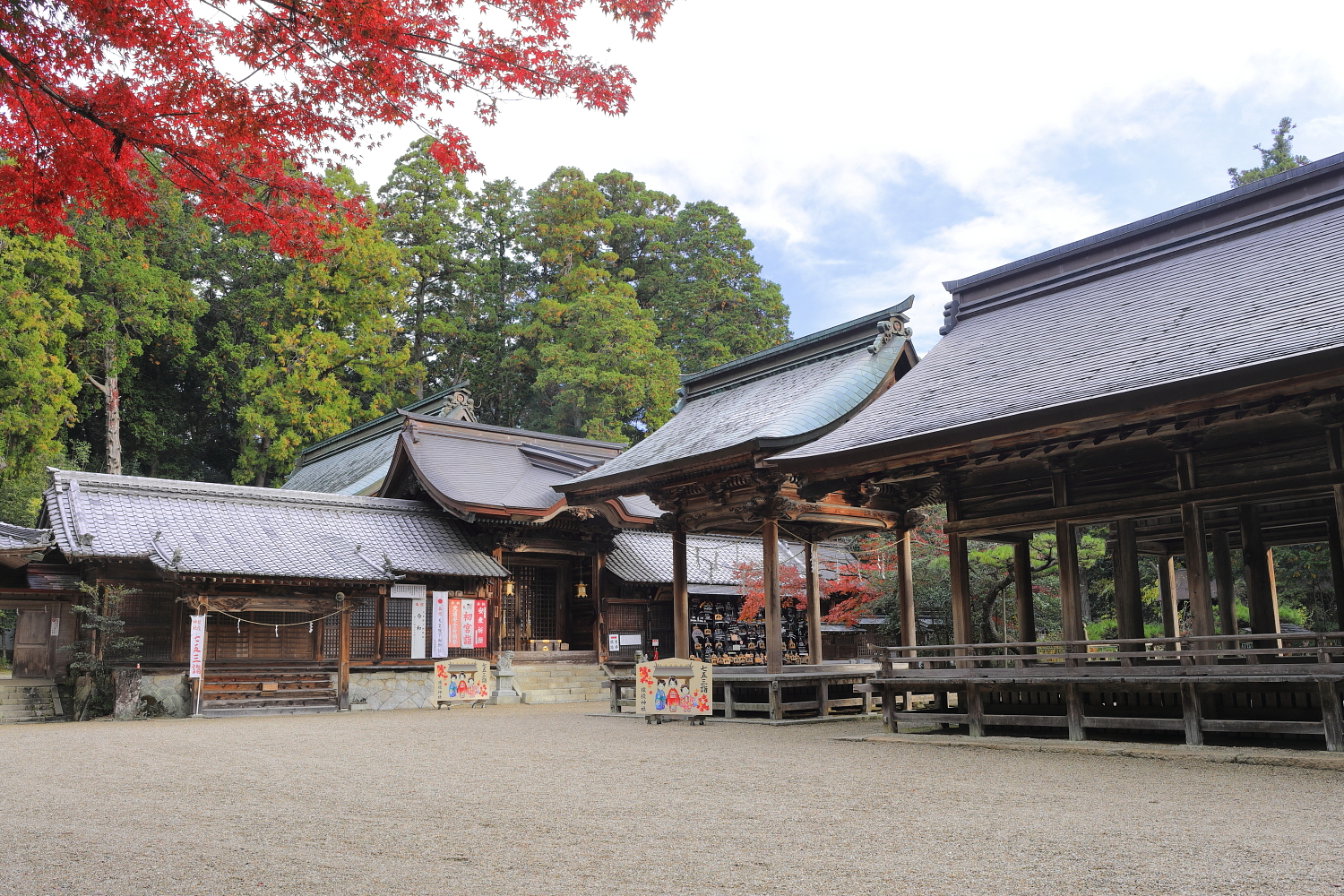
- Toyota skyline Toyota Stadium Toyota Motor Corporation headquarters Kōrankei Asuke Town Kuragaike Park Sanage-jinja Shrine

- Flag Emblem
- Interactive map outlining Toyota
- Location of Toyota in Aichi Prefecture

- Location within Japan
- Coordinates: 35°4′56.8″N 137°9′22.8″E
- Country: Japan
- Region: Chūbu (Tōkai)
- Prefecture: Aichi

Government
  - Mayor: Toshihiko Ota

Area
  - Total: 918.32 km^{2} (354.57 sq mi)

Population (October 1, 2019)
  - Total: 426,162
  - Density: 464.07/km^{2} (1,201.9/sq mi)
- Time zone: UTC+9 (Japan Standard Time)
- Phone number: 0565-31-1212
- Address: 3–60 Nishimachi, Toyota-shi, Aichi-ken 471-8501
- Climate: Cfa
- Website: Official website
- Symbols
- Flower: Sunflower
- Tree: Zelkova serrata

Toyota (豊田市, Toyota-shi; Japanese pronunciation: [tó̞.jò̞.tä̀, tò̞.jó̞.tä́.ɕì]), formerly known as Koromo, is a city in Aichi Prefecture, Japan. As of 1 October 2019, the city had an estimated population of 426,162 and a population density of 464 people per km^{2}. The total area was 918.32 square kilometres (354.57 sq mi). It is located about 50 minutes from Nagoya by way of the Meitetsu Toyota Line.

Several of Toyota Motor Corporation's manufacturing plants, including the Tsutsumi plant, are located there. The longstanding ties between the Toyota Motor Corporation and the town of Toyota, formerly known as Koromo (挙母市, Koromo-shi), gave the town its current name. The city's flag (and seal), is a unicursal hexagram.

== Geography ==
Toyota is located in north-central Aichi Prefecture, and is the largest city in the prefecture in terms of area. The city area is mountainous to the north, with peaks averaging around 1000 feet (328 m) in height along its northern border with Nagano and Gifu Prefectures. Much of the mountainous northern portion of the city is within Aichi Kōgen Quasi-National Park.

Toyota is within a two hour drive of Nagoya.

=== Climate ===
The city has a climate characterized by hot and humid summers, and relatively mild winters (Köppen climate classification, Cfa). The average annual temperature in Toyota is 15.3 °C (59.5 °F). The average annual rainfall is 1,470.4 mm (57.89 in) with September as the wettest month. The temperatures are highest on average in August, at around 27.4 °C (81.3 °F), and lowest in January, at around 3.6 °C (38.5 °F).

Climate data for Toyota (1991−2020 normals, extremes 1979−present)
Month	Jan	Feb	Mar	Apr	May	Jun	Jul	Aug	Sep	Oct	Nov	Dec	Year
Record high °C (°F)	17.8 (64.0)	22.2 (72.0)	25.7 (78.3)	30.5 (86.9)	34.4 (93.9)	39.3 (102.7)	40.8 (105.4)	39.6 (103.3)	38.1 (100.6)	34.1 (93.4)	26.5 (79.7)	22.6 (72.7)	40.8 (105.4)
Mean daily maximum °C (°F)	9.1 (48.4)	10.3 (50.5)	14.2 (57.6)	19.9 (67.8)	24.7 (76.5)	27.7 (81.9)	31.5 (88.7)	33.3 (91.9)	29.2 (84.6)	23.3 (73.9)	17.4 (63.3)	11.6 (52.9)	21.0 (69.8)
Daily mean °C (°F)	3.6 (38.5)	4.5 (40.1)	8.3 (46.9)	13.7 (56.7)	18.5 (65.3)	22.3 (72.1)	26.3 (79.3)	27.4 (81.3)	23.7 (74.7)	17.6 (63.7)	11.4 (52.5)	5.9 (42.6)	15.3 (59.5)
Mean daily minimum °C (°F)	−1.3 (29.7)	−0.8 (30.6)	2.4 (36.3)	7.5 (45.5)	12.7 (54.9)	17.8 (64.0)	22.1 (71.8)	23.0 (73.4)	19.3 (66.7)	12.9 (55.2)	6.3 (43.3)	1.0 (33.8)	10.2 (50.4)
Record low °C (°F)	−8.6 (16.5)	−8.8 (16.2)	−5.6 (21.9)	−2.6 (27.3)	0.8 (33.4)	8.2 (46.8)	14.7 (58.5)	14.1 (57.4)	6.5 (43.7)	1.1 (34.0)	−2.5 (27.5)	−7.6 (18.3)	−8.8 (16.2)
Average precipitation mm (inches)	48.0 (1.89)	61.2 (2.41)	112.0 (4.41)	119.5 (4.70)	142.2 (5.60)	183.6 (7.23)	195.3 (7.69)	125.8 (4.95)	201.8 (7.94)	152.8 (6.02)	75.9 (2.99)	52.6 (2.07)	1,470.4 (57.89)
Average precipitation days (≥ 1.0 mm)	5.7	6.7	9.1	9.6	9.6	11.6	12.1	8.6	11.0	9.7	6.6	6.6	106.9
Mean monthly sunshine hours	171.6	175.0	198.7	203.0	202.6	148.5	172.1	209.6	161.6	168.6	166.2	165.9	2,143.3
Source: Japan Meteorological Agency

Climate data for Inabu, Toyota (1991−2020 normals, extremes 1979−present)
Month	Jan	Feb	Mar	Apr	May	Jun	Jul	Aug	Sep	Oct	Nov	Dec	Year
Record high °C (°F)	15.3 (59.5)	18.2 (64.8)	24.1 (75.4)	27.4 (81.3)	30.5 (86.9)	34.7 (94.5)	35.6 (96.1)	35.1 (95.2)	33.6 (92.5)	29.4 (84.9)	22.7 (72.9)	19.7 (67.5)	35.6 (96.1)
Mean daily maximum °C (°F)	5.4 (41.7)	6.9 (44.4)	11.1 (52.0)	16.9 (62.4)	21.5 (70.7)	24.4 (75.9)	28.0 (82.4)	29.4 (84.9)	25.8 (78.4)	20.2 (68.4)	14.3 (57.7)	8.2 (46.8)	17.7 (63.8)
Daily mean °C (°F)	0.2 (32.4)	1.0 (33.8)	4.8 (40.6)	10.2 (50.4)	15.2 (59.4)	19.1 (66.4)	22.9 (73.2)	23.7 (74.7)	20.1 (68.2)	14.1 (57.4)	7.8 (46.0)	2.5 (36.5)	11.8 (53.3)
Mean daily minimum °C (°F)	−4.1 (24.6)	−3.9 (25.0)	−0.7 (30.7)	3.9 (39.0)	9.3 (48.7)	14.7 (58.5)	18.9 (66.0)	19.6 (67.3)	16.1 (61.0)	9.5 (49.1)	2.8 (37.0)	−1.9 (28.6)	7.0 (44.6)
Record low °C (°F)	−13.9 (7.0)	−16.1 (3.0)	−11.2 (11.8)	−5.7 (21.7)	−0.9 (30.4)	4.3 (39.7)	11.3 (52.3)	9.6 (49.3)	3.8 (38.8)	−1.8 (28.8)	−6.5 (20.3)	−12.0 (10.4)	−16.1 (3.0)
Average precipitation mm (inches)	69.7 (2.74)	85.8 (3.38)	160.6 (6.32)	157.8 (6.21)	169.4 (6.67)	223.8 (8.81)	281.8 (11.09)	214.4 (8.44)	296.3 (11.67)	190.5 (7.50)	99.4 (3.91)	76.8 (3.02)	2,026.2 (79.77)
Average precipitation days (≥ 1.0 mm)	8.0	8.2	10.8	11.2	10.9	13.5	14.7	12.0	12.3	10.6	8.0	8.4	128.6
Mean monthly sunshine hours	143.9	157.3	183.6	195.2	193.4	136.3	154.3	187.4	149.4	156.3	153.1	139.4	1,949.7
Source: Japan Meteorological Agency

=== Demographics ===
Toyota MEA

Per Japanese census data, the population of Toyota has been increasing over the past 50 years.

Historical population
Year	Pop.	±%
1960	151,632	—
1970	234,078	+54.4%
1980	315,871	+34.9%
1990	370,858	+17.4%
2000	395,224	+6.6%
2010	421,552	+6.7%

=== Surrounding municipalities ===
Aichi Prefecture

- Anjō
- Chiryu
- Kariya
- Miyoshi
- Nagakute
- Nisshin
- Okazaki
- Seto
- Shinshiro
- Shitara

Gifu Prefecture

- Ena
- Mizunami
- Toki

Nagano Prefecture

- Neba

=== City scape ===
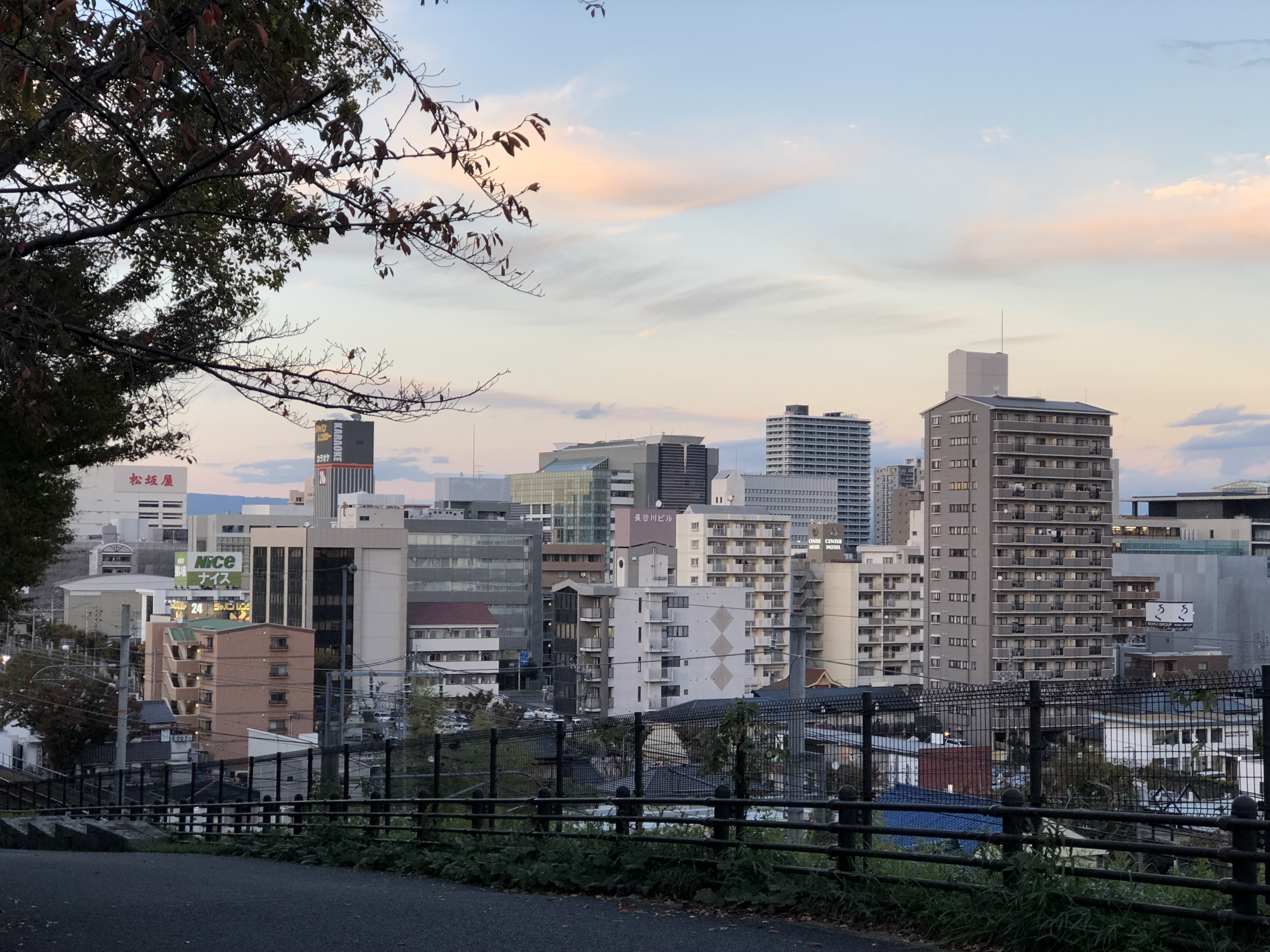
Skyline of Toyota

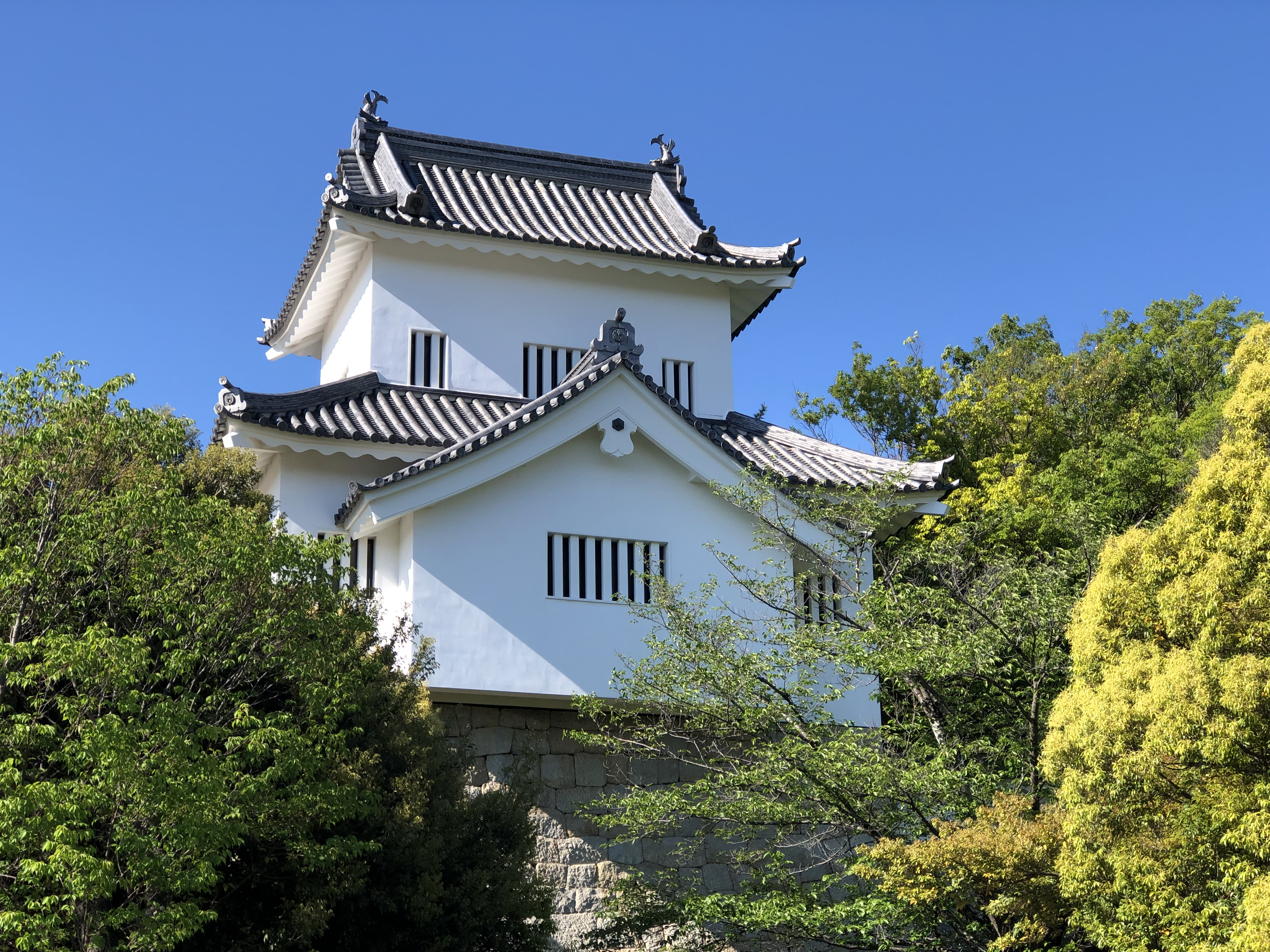
Reconstructed Yagura of Koromo Castle

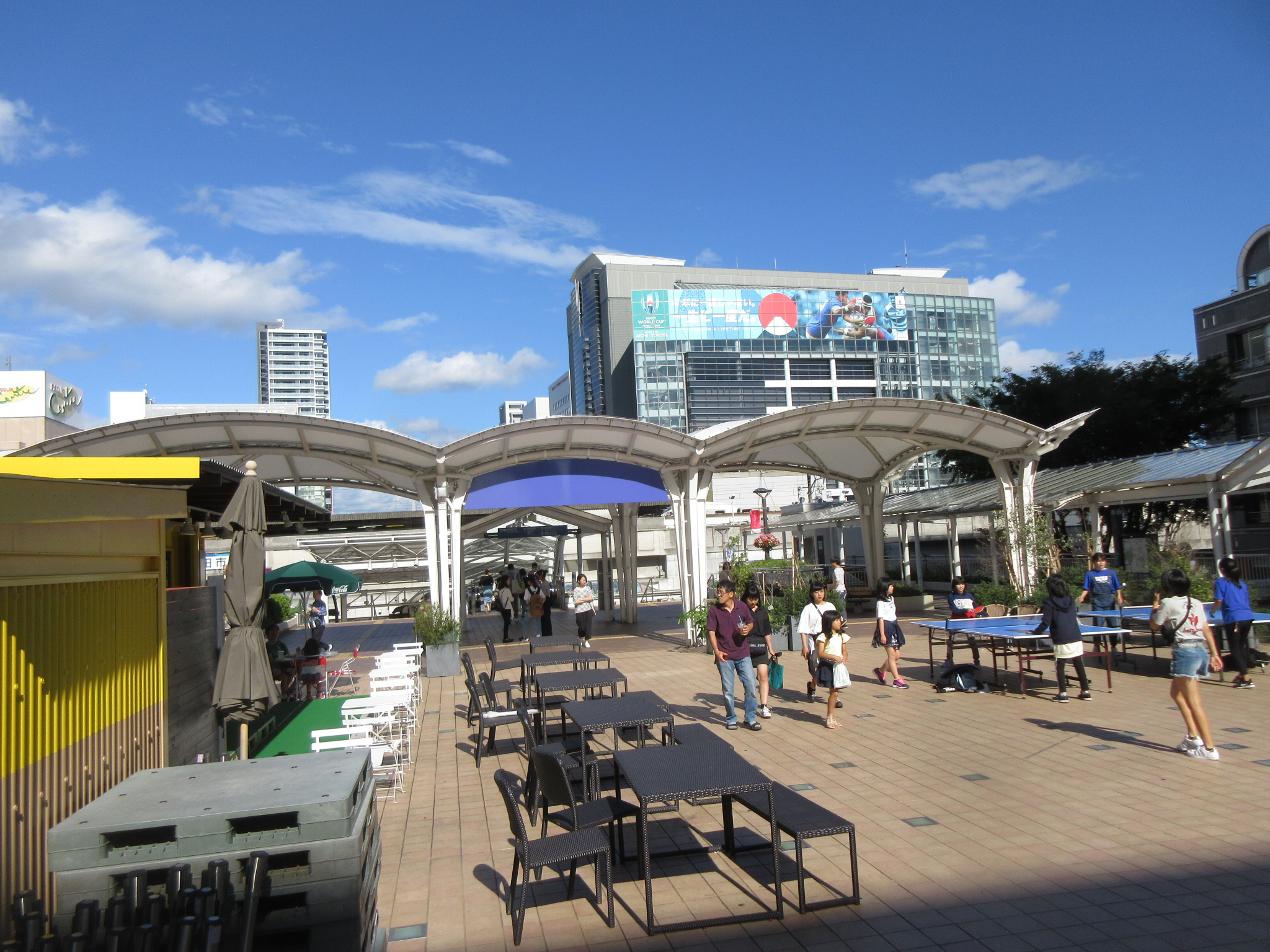
Toyotashi Station Pedestrian Deck

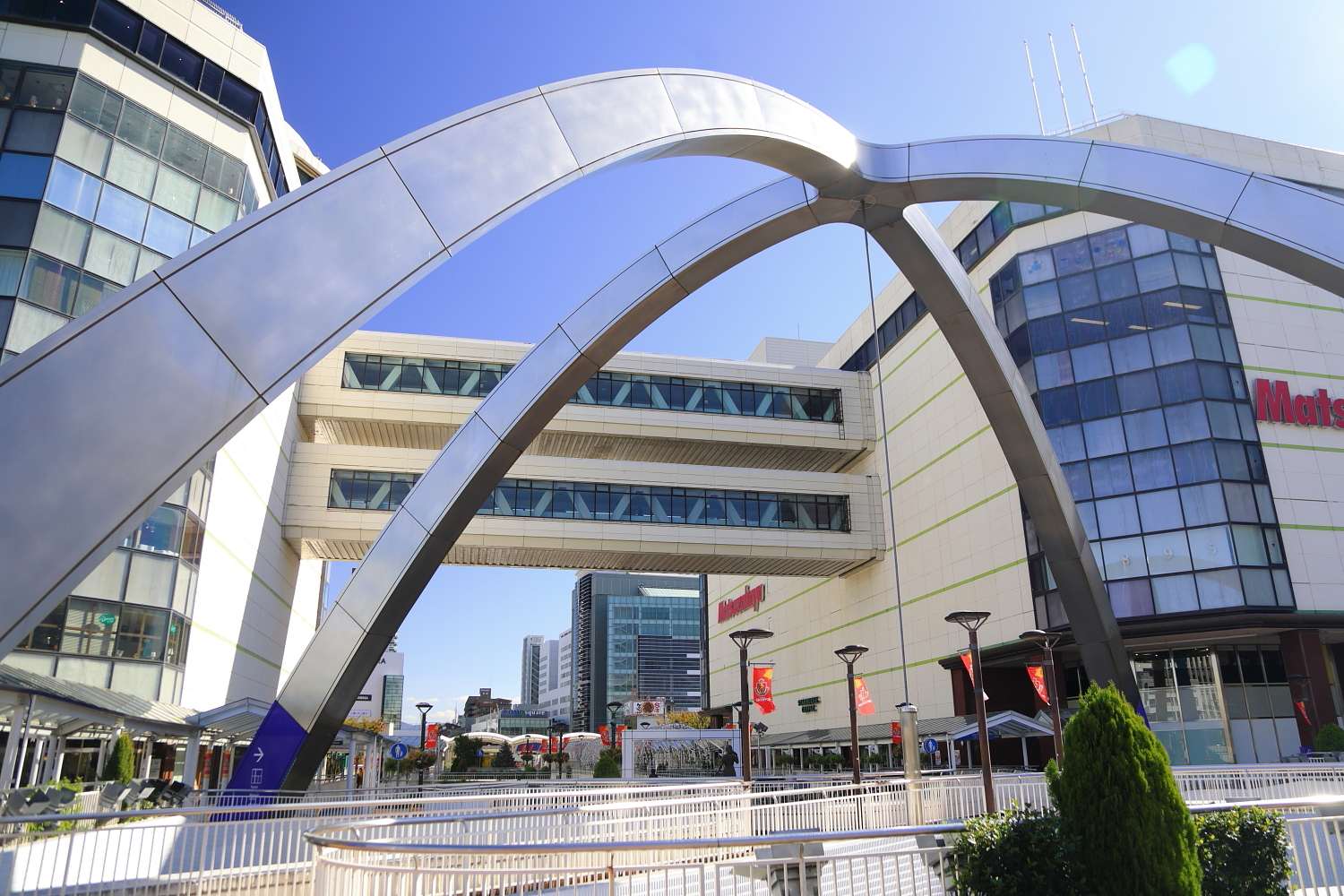
Downtown of Toyota

== History ==
=== Origins ===
The area of present-day Toyota City has been inhabited since prehistoric times, and archaeologists have found a continuous record of artifacts from the Japanese paleolithic period onwards. In early proto-historic times, the area was under the control of the Mononobe clan, who built numerous kofun burial mounds. The local place name "Koromo" is mentioned in the Kojiki and other early Japanese documents.

=== Edo period ===
During the Edo period, parts of the area of the current city were under the control of Koromo Domain, a feudal han under the Tokugawa shogunate; however, most of the area of the current city was tenryō territory controlled directly by the government in Edo and administered through hatamoto class appointed administrators. The village of "Matsudaira", from which Tokugawa Ieyasu took his clan name, was located within what is now the city of Toyota.

=== Meiji period ===
After the Meiji restoration, the area was organized into the towns of Asuke and Koromo and numerous villages under Higashikamo District and Nishikamo District with the establishment of the modern municipalities system.

The area was a major producer of silk and prospered from the Meiji period through the Taishō periods. As the demand for raw silk declined in Japan and abroad, Koromo entered a period of gradual decline after 1930. The decline encouraged Kiichiro Toyoda, cousin of Eiji Toyoda, to look for alternatives to the family's automatic loom manufacturing business. The search led to the founding of what became the Toyota Motor Corporation. Toyota built the first manufacturing facility, known as Toyota Honsha plant in November 1938, breaking ground in December 1935.

=== Modern history ===
On March 1, 1951, Koromo gained city status, and absorbed the village of Takahashi from Nishikamo District on September 30, 1956. Due to the fame and economic importance of its major employer, the city of Koromo (挙母市) changed its name to Toyota on January 1, 1959.

Toyota became a sister city with Detroit, Michigan, United States in 1960. It continued to expand by annexing the towns of Kamigo (Hekikai District) on March 1, 1964, and Takaoka (Hekikai District) on September 1, 1965, and Sanage (Nishikamo District) on April 1, 1967, as well as the village of Matsudaira (Higashikamo District) on April 1, 1970.

In 1979, the Nagoya Railroad (Meitetsu) opened the Toyota New Line (now Toyota Line), and in 1988, the Aichi Loop Line was opened, thus considerably improving access to the city via rail transport.

Toyota became a Core City in 1998, with increased local autonomy.

On March 25, 2005, Expo 2005 opened with its main site in Nagakute and additional activity in Seto and Toyota. The Expo continued until September 25, 2005.

On April 1, 2005, Toyota absorbed the town of Fujioka, and the village of Obara (both from Nishikamo District), the towns of Asuke, Asahi and Inabu, and the village of Shimoyama (all from Higashikamo District) to create the new and expanded city of Toyota.

Mitsuru Obe and Eric Pfanner of The Wall Street Journal stated that by 2015 Toyota was recovering from an economic depression "so deep that some were comparing it to Detroit."

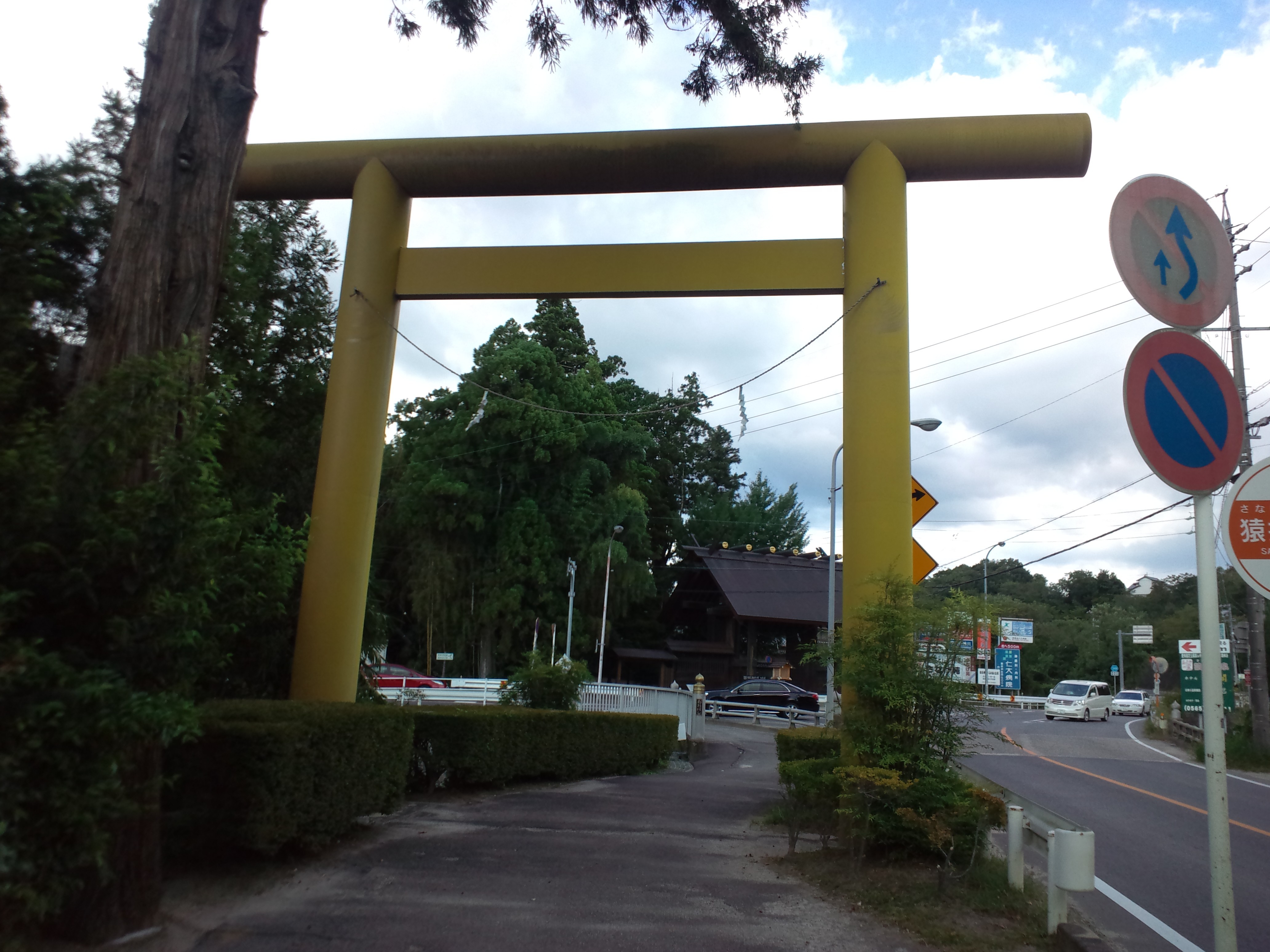
Sanage shinto shrine

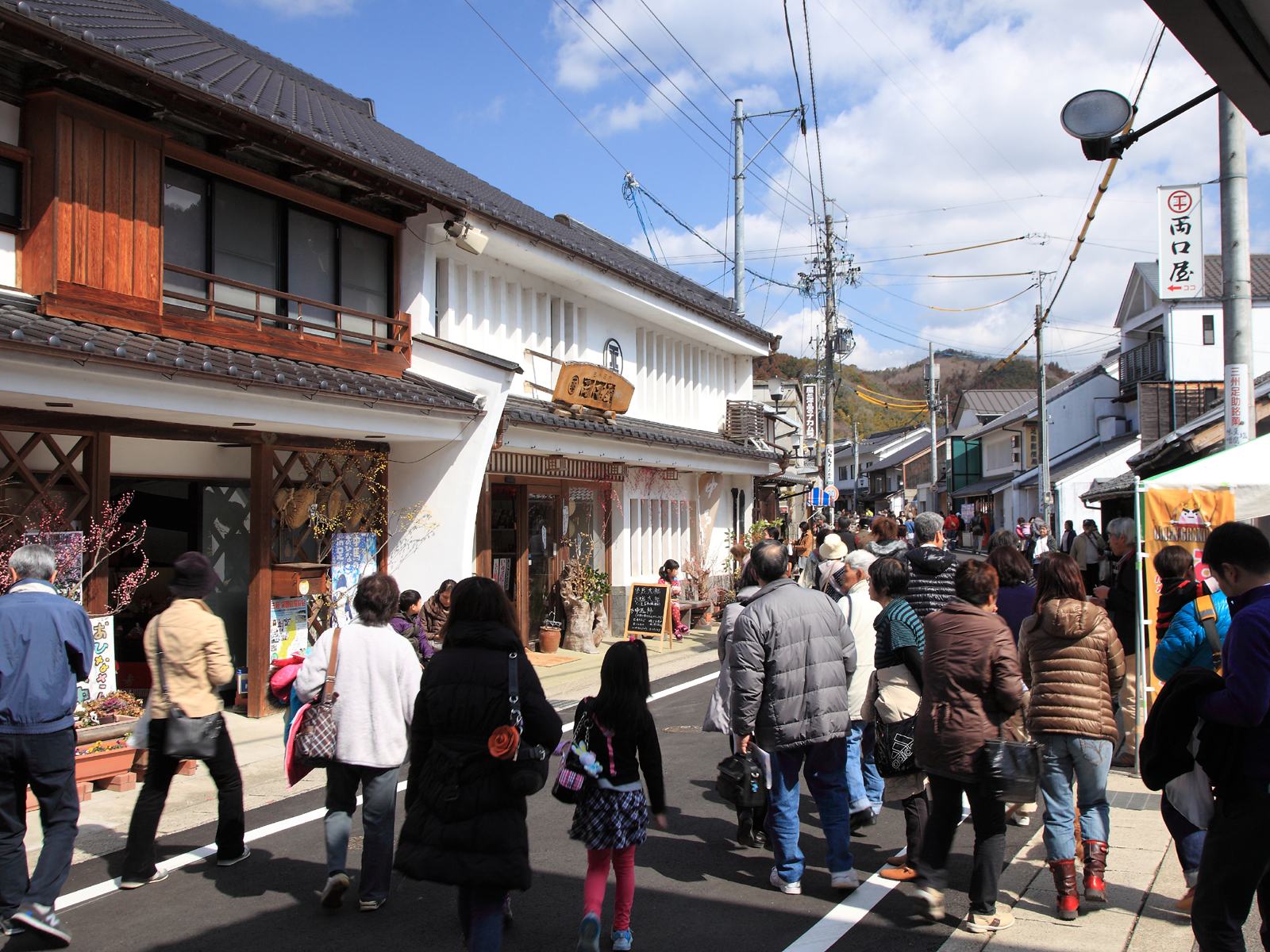
Asuke area (Groups of Traditional Buildings)

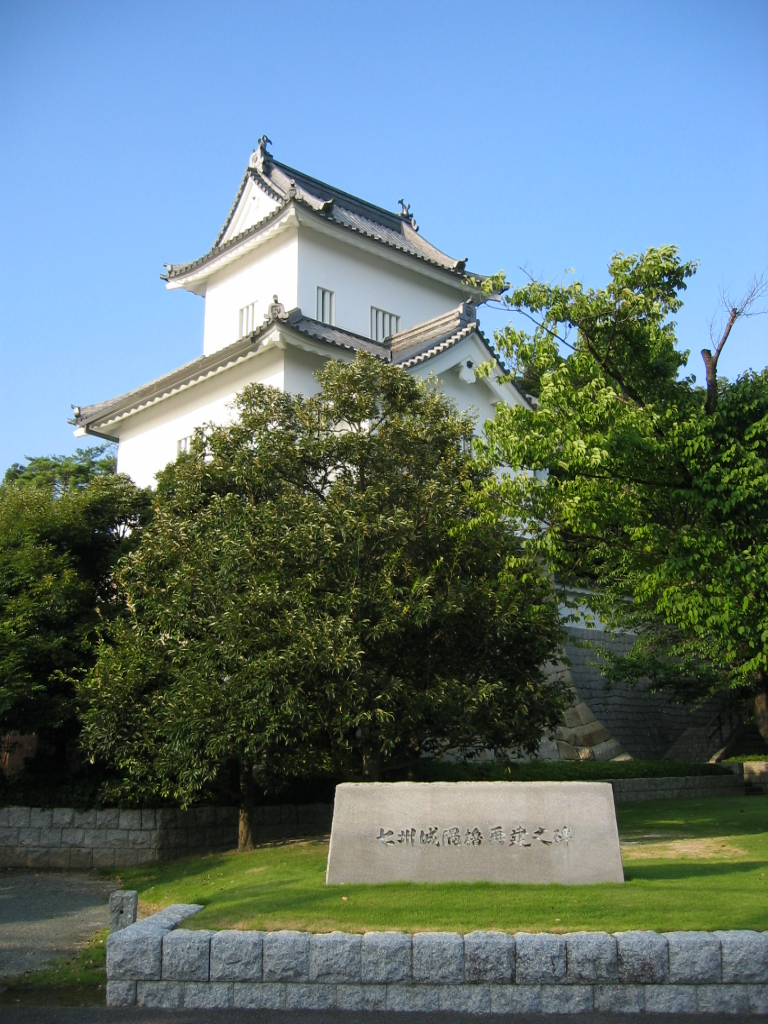
Koromo Castle

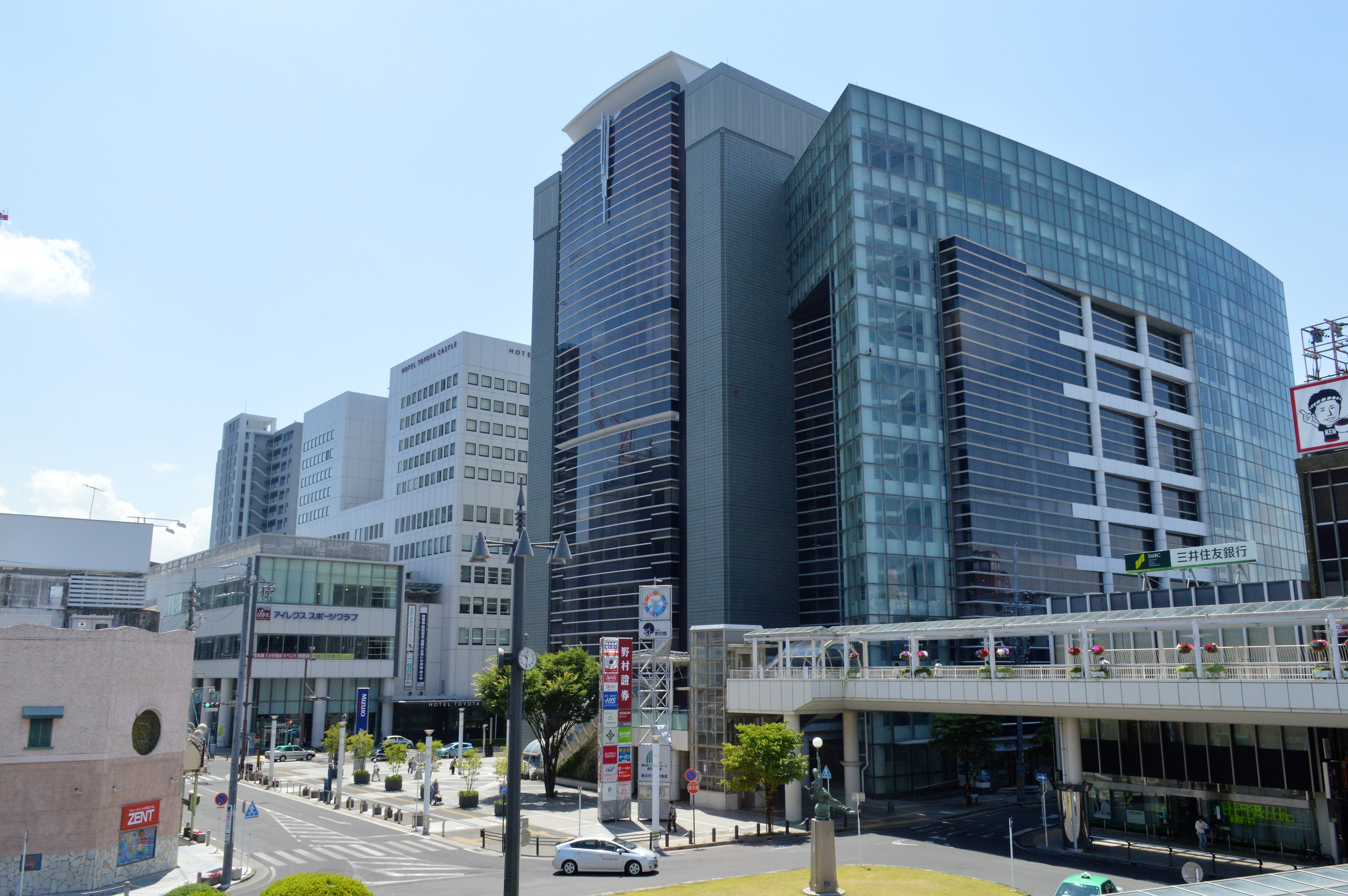
City center of Toyota

== Government ==
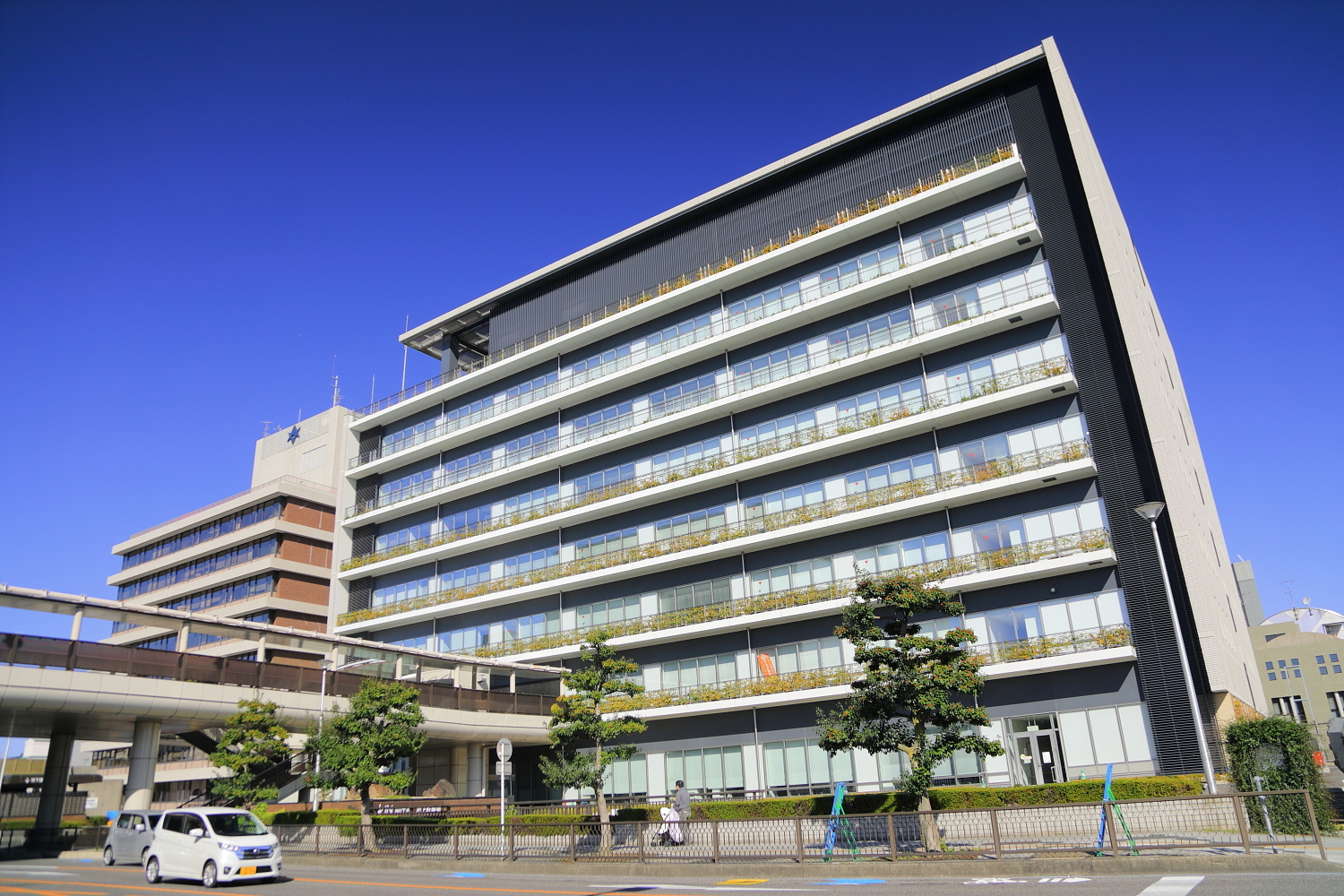
Toyota City Hall

=== Mayor-council ===
Toyota has a mayor-council form of government with a directly elected mayor and a unicameral city legislature of 45 members.

=== Prefectural Assembly ===
The city contributes five members to the Aichi Prefectural Assembly.

=== House of Representatives ===
In terms of national politics, the city is divided between Aichi District 11 and Aichi District 14 of the lower house of the Diet of Japan.

== Public ==
=== Police ===
- Aichi Prefectural Police
  - Asuke police station
  - Toyota police station

=== Firefighting ===
- Fire department
  - Asuke fire department
  - Toyota-Kita fire department
  - Toyota-Minami fire department
  - Toyota-naka fire department

=== Health care ===
- Hospital
  - Asuke Hospital
  - Toyota Kosei Hospital
  - TOYOTA Memorial Hospital

=== Post office ===
- Toyota Post office

=== Library ===
- Toyota City Library
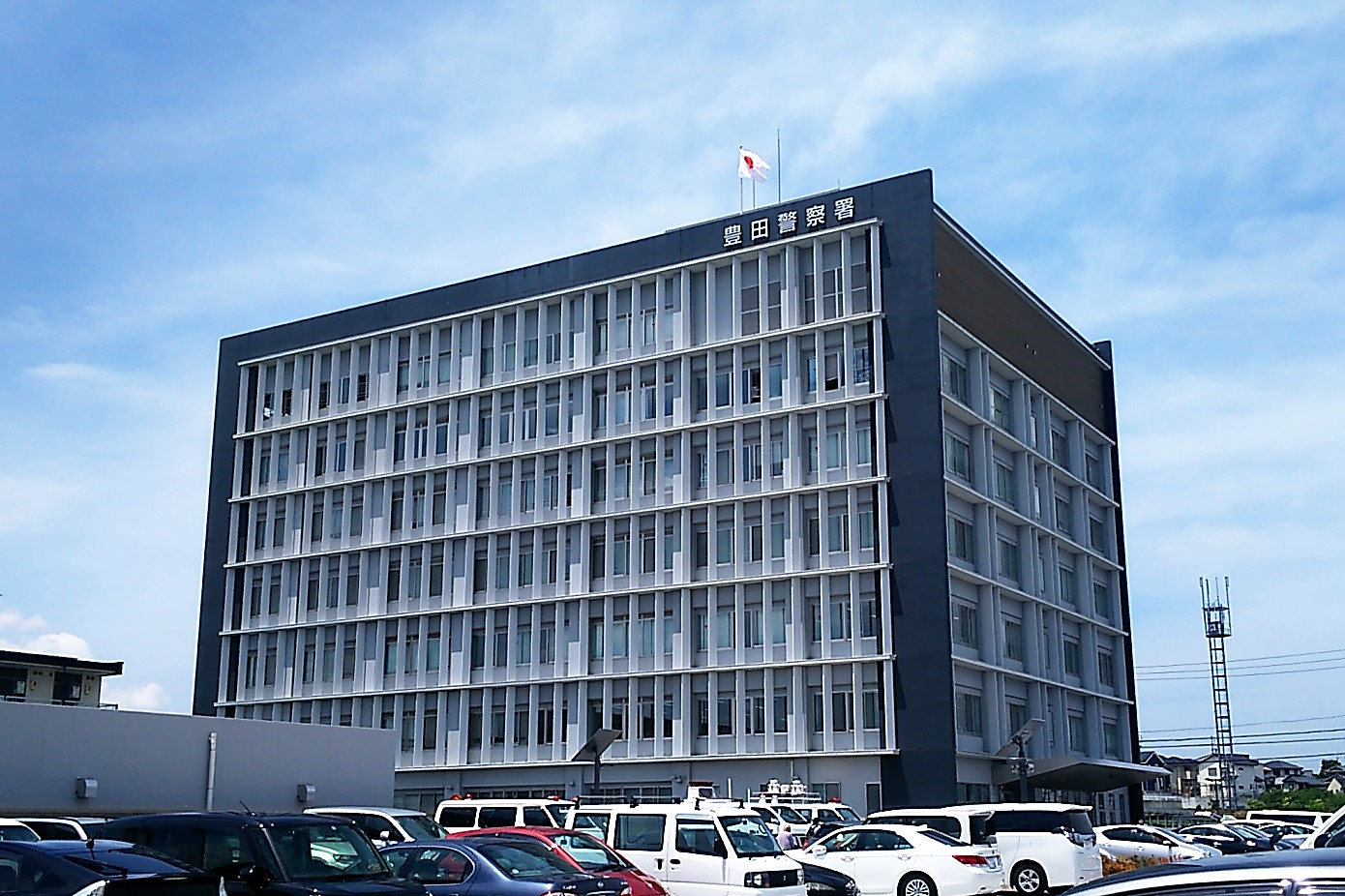
Toyota Police Station

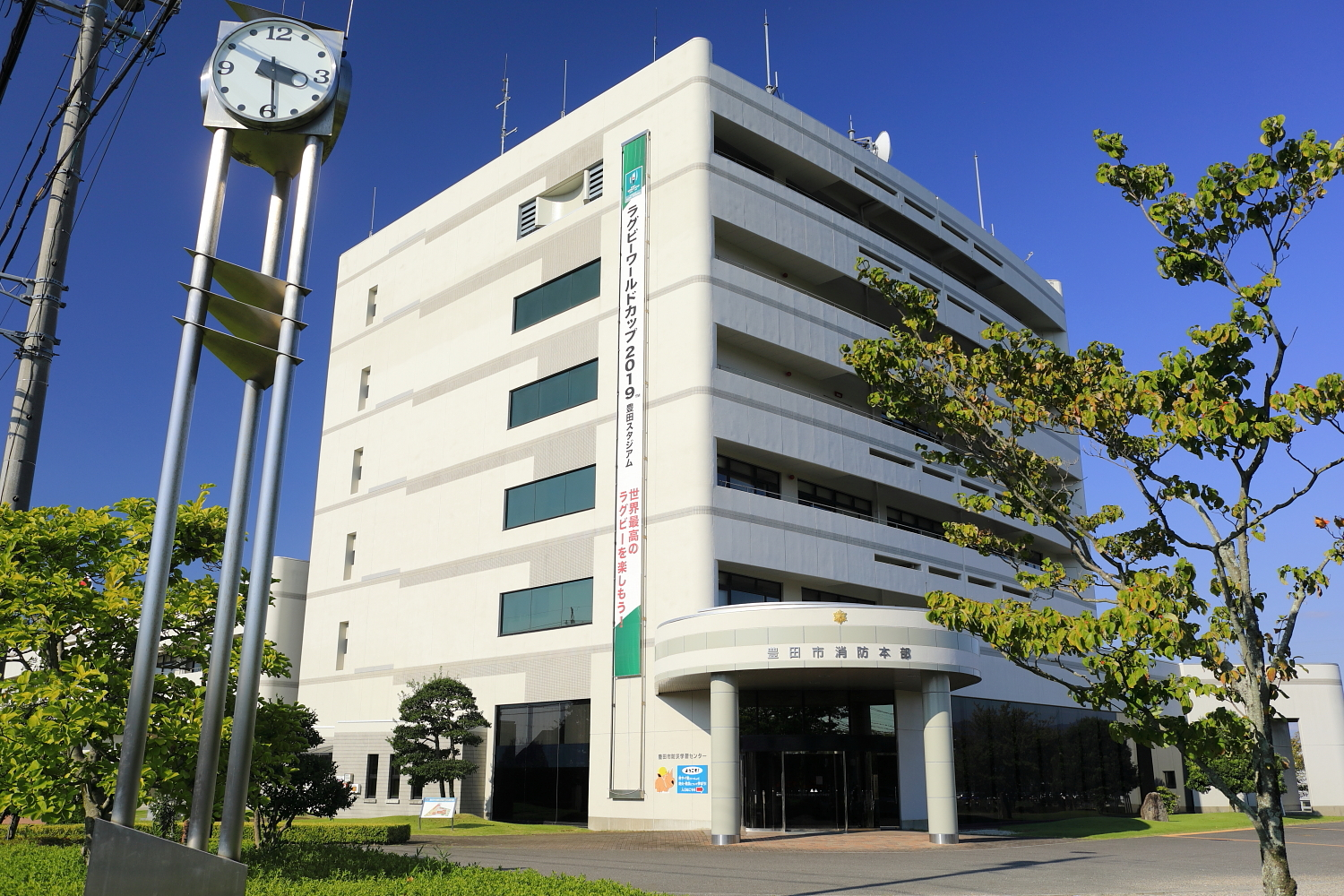
Toyota Fire Department

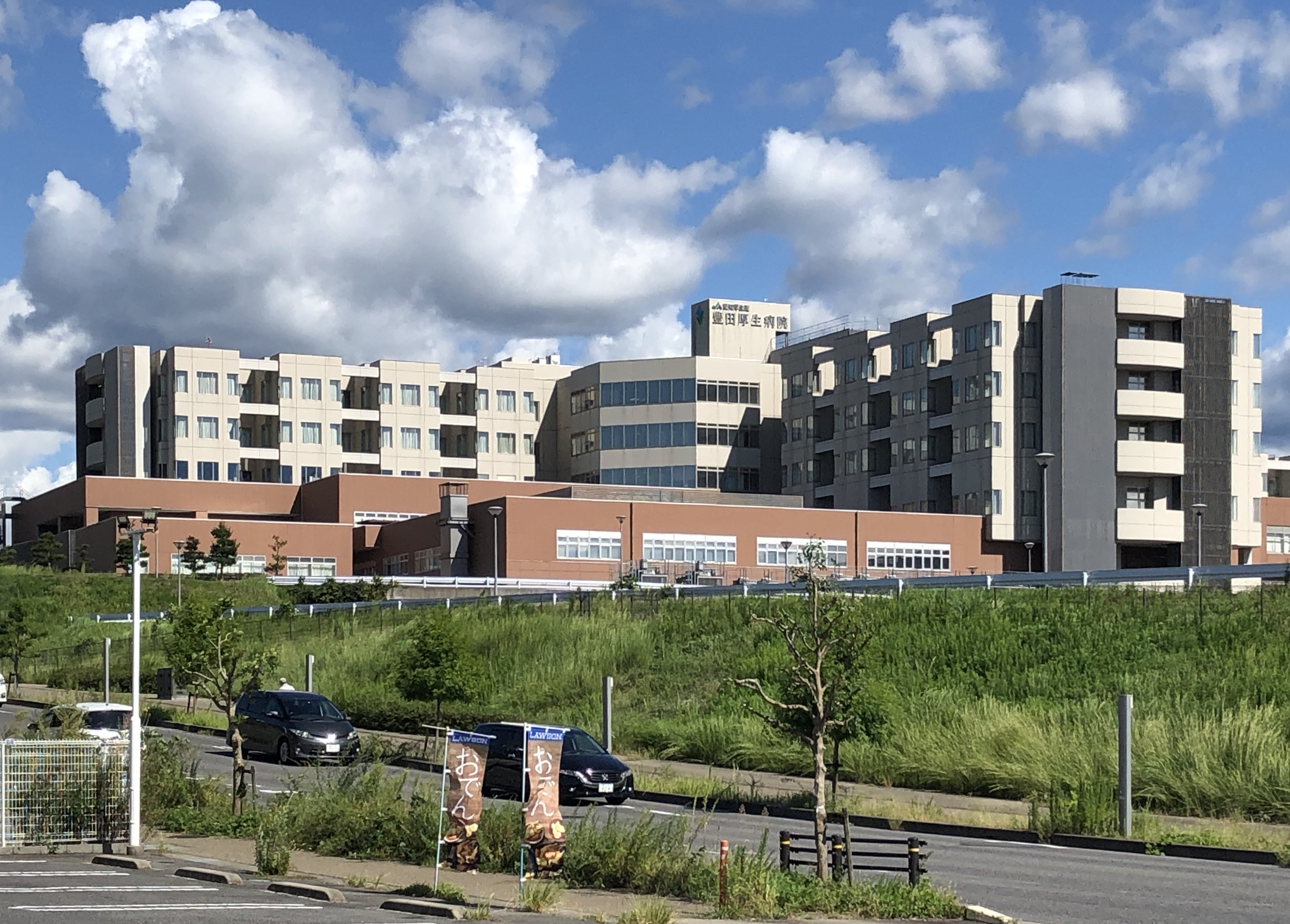
Toyota Kosei Hospital

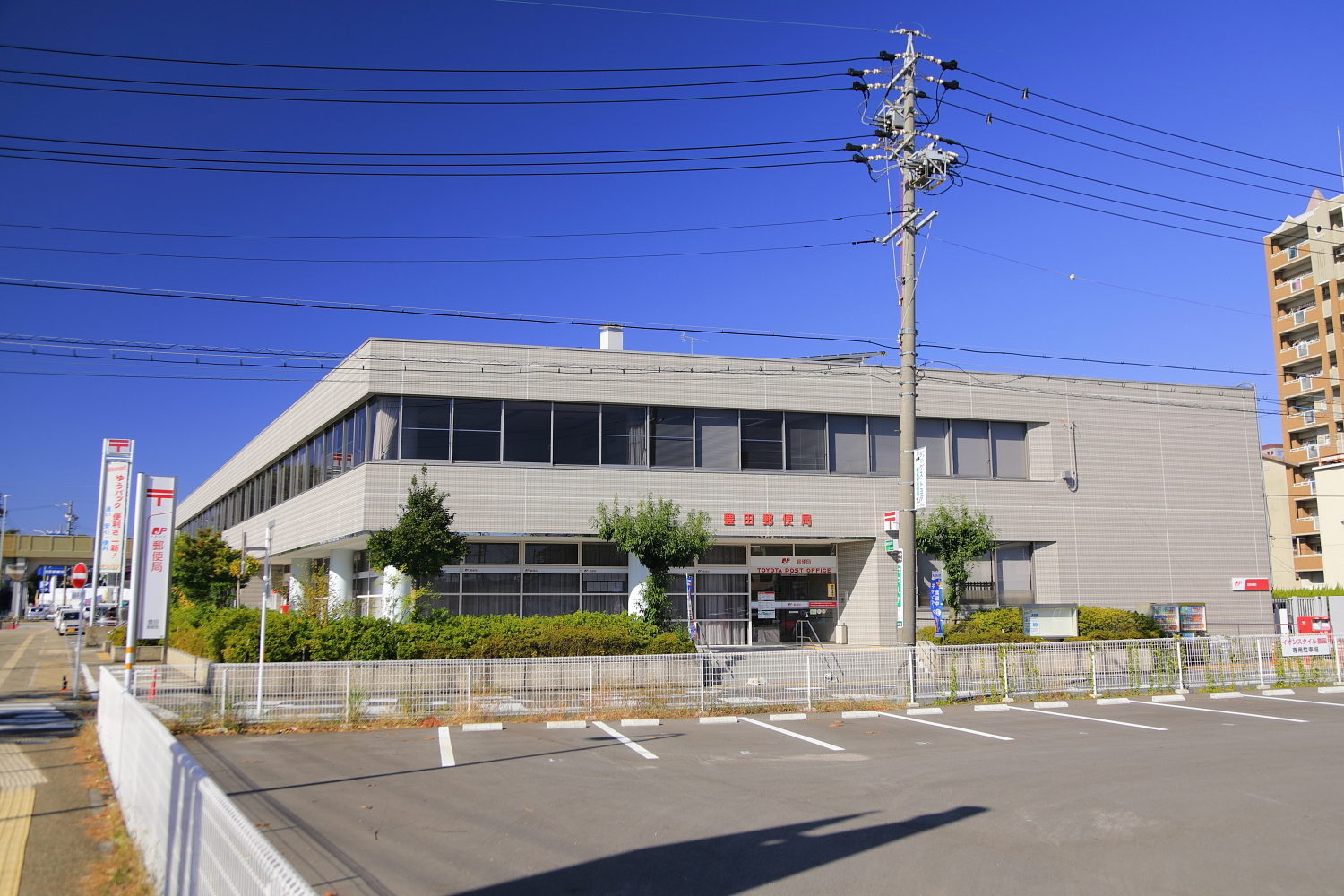
Toyota Post Office

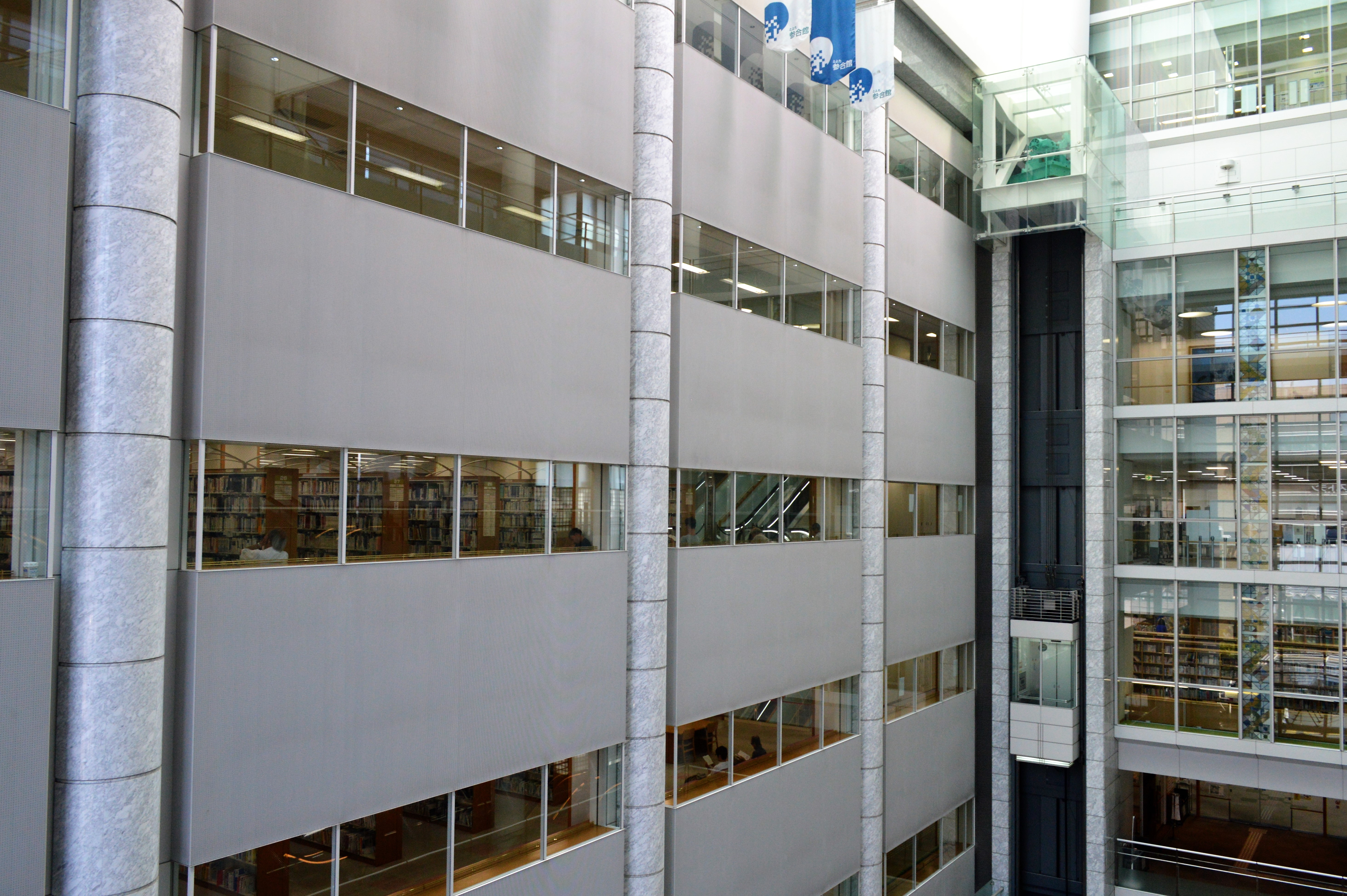
Toyota City Library

== Sister cities ==
Toyota is twinned with:

- Detroit, Michigan, United States, since 1960
- Derbyshire, England, United Kingdom, since 1998

== Economy ==
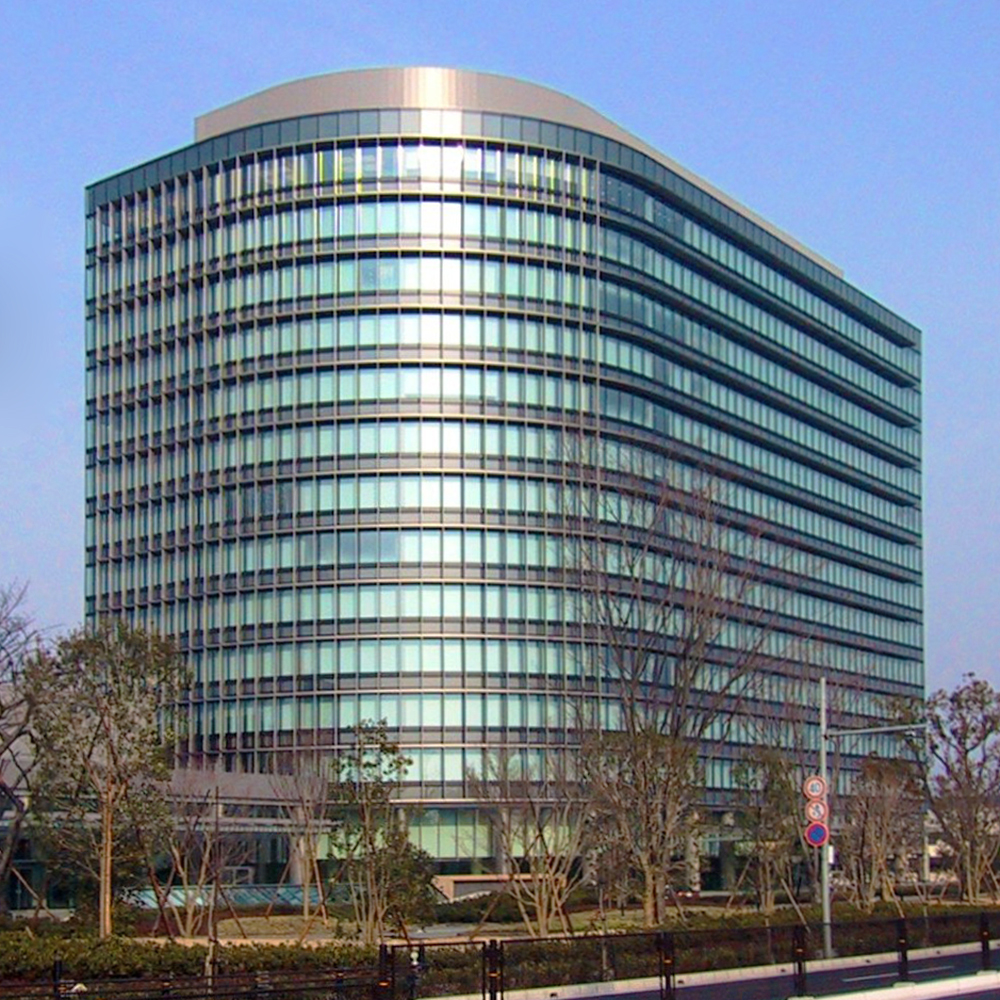
Principal headquarters building of Toyota Motor Corporation

=== Primary sector of the economy ===
Agriculture

- Peach
- Pyrus pyrifolia (Atago)

Forestry

- Cryptomeria
- Chamaecyparis obtusa

=== Secondary sector of the economy ===
The main headquarters of Toyota is located in a 14-story building in Toyota. As of 2006 the head office has the "Toyopet" Toyota logo and the words "Toyota Motor". The Toyota Technical Center, a 14-story building, and the original Honsha plant, Toyota's first plant engaging in mass production and formerly named the Koromo plant, are adjacent to one another in a location near the headquarters. Vinod Jacob from The Hindu described the main headquarters building as "modest". In 2013 company head Akio Toyoda reported that it had difficulties retaining foreign employees at the headquarters due to the lack of amenities in Toyota.

=== Tertiary sector of the economy ===
Shopping center

- Æon Takahashi (GREEN CITY)
- Æon Toyota
- KiTARA
- Lut's
- Meglia
- T-FACE
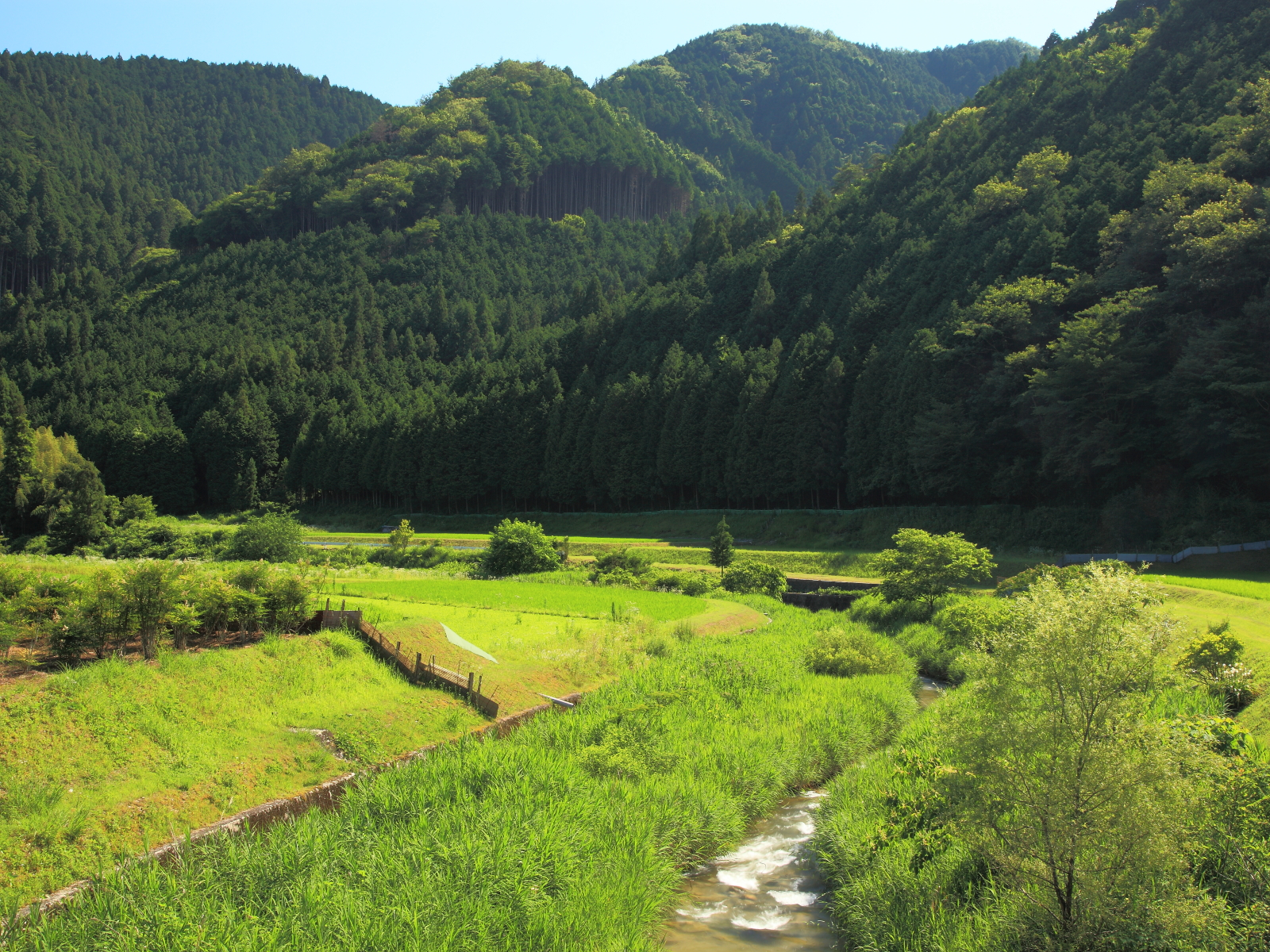
Azakai Town

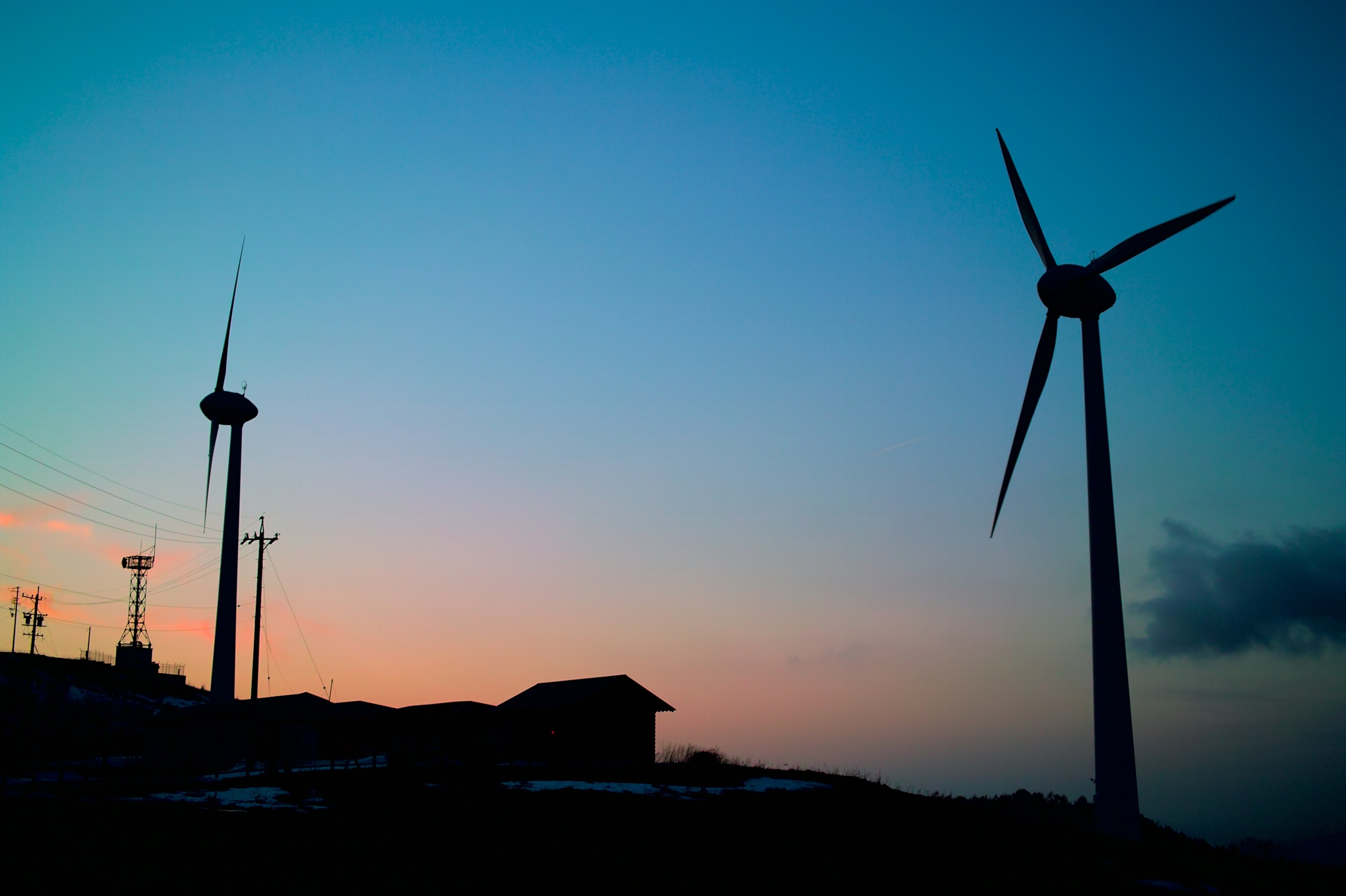
Inabu Town

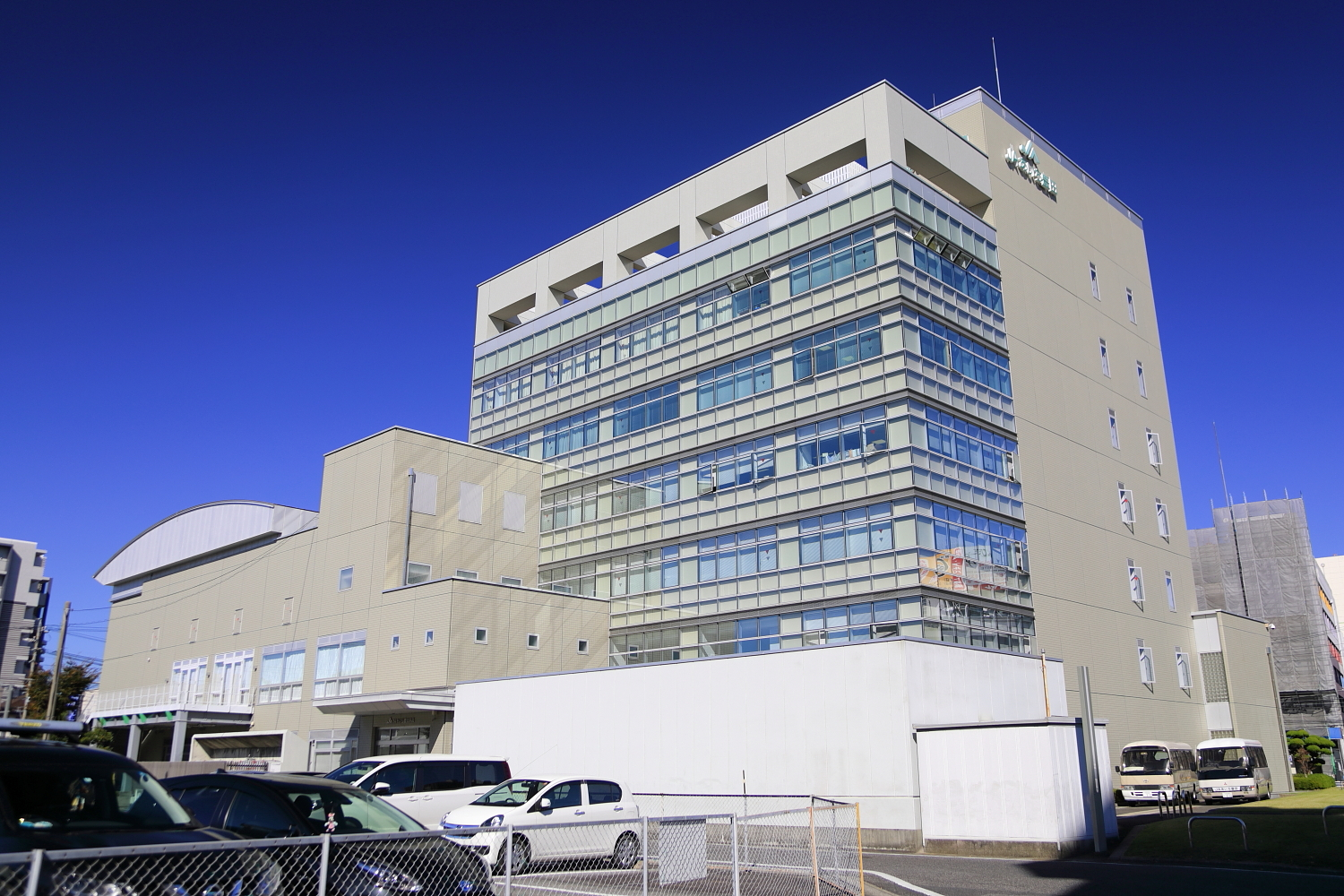
JA Aichi Toyota

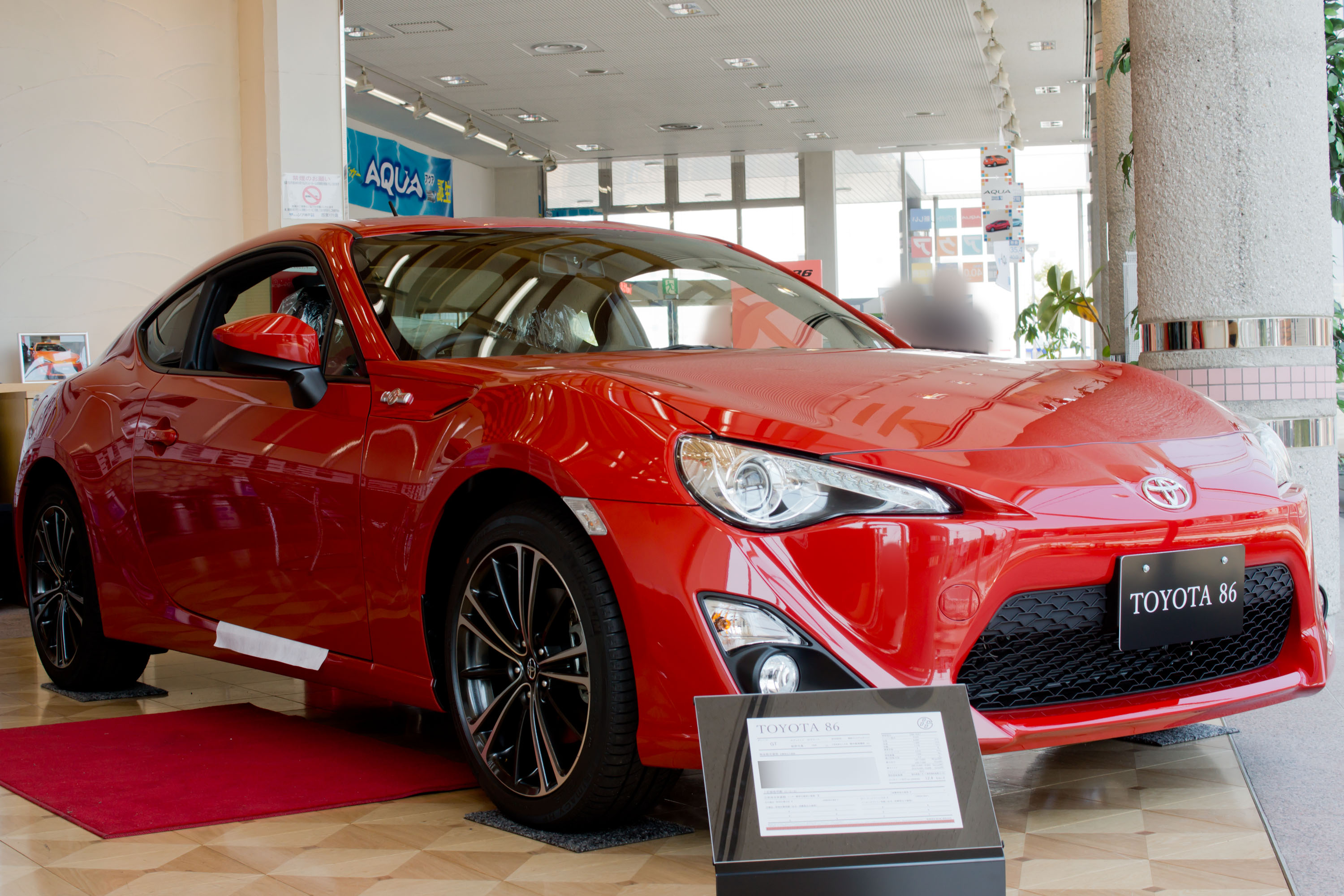
Toyota 86

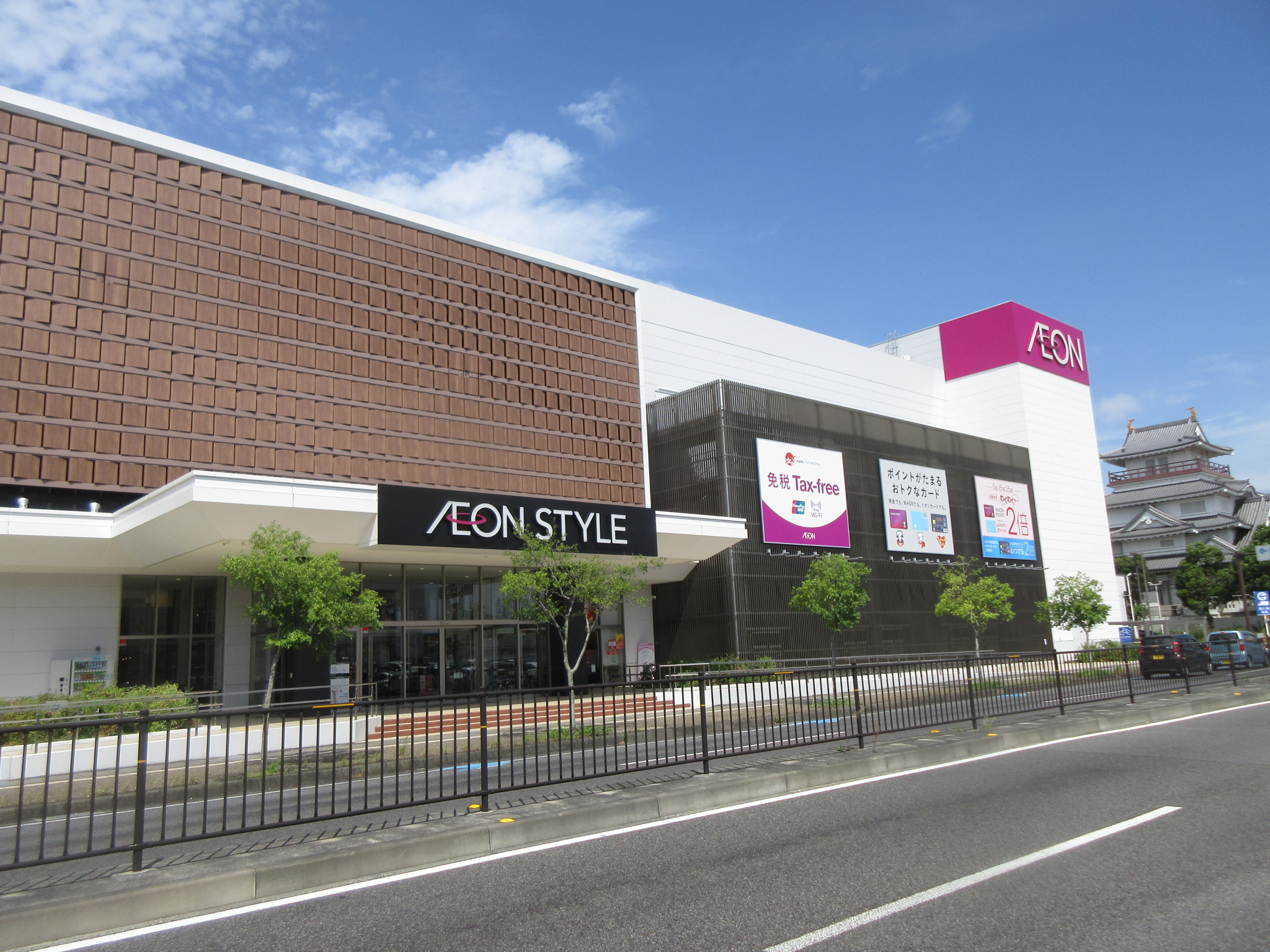
Æon Toyota

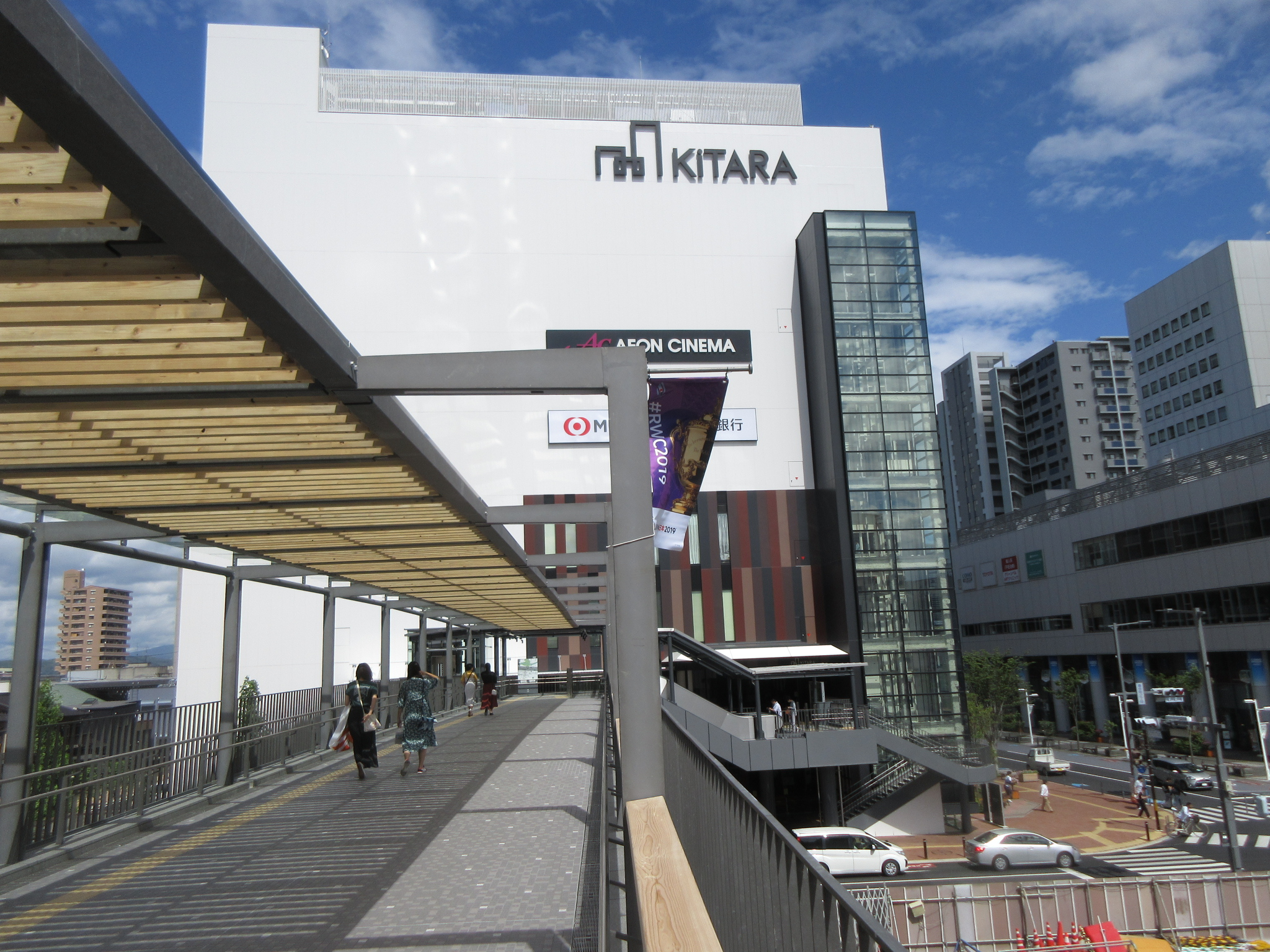
KiTARA

== Education ==
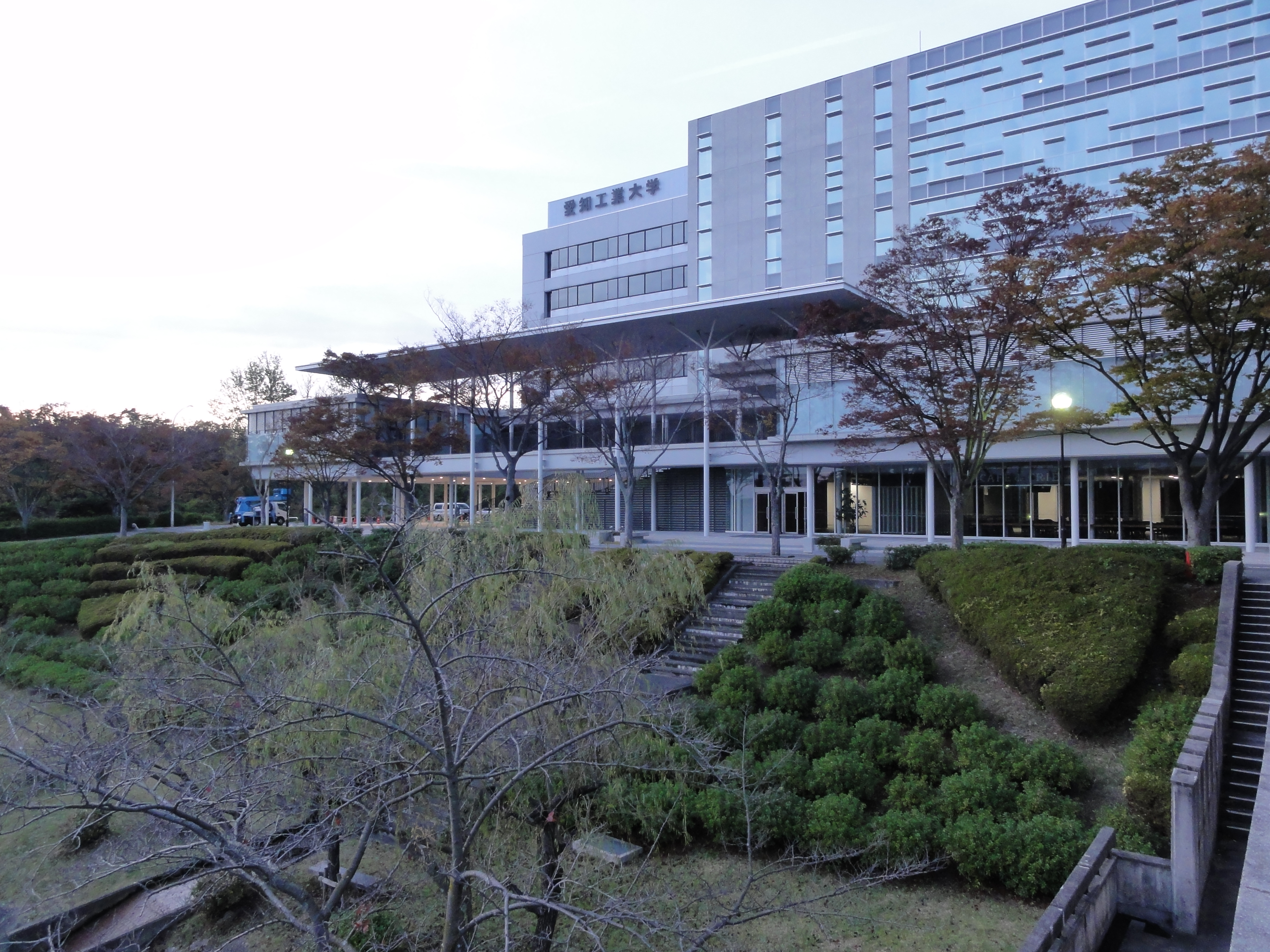
Aichi Institute of Technology

=== Colleges and universities ===
- Aichi Gakusen University
- Aichi Institute of Technology
- Aichi Mizuho College
- Chukyo University – Toyota campus
- Japanese Red Cross Toyota College of Nursing
- Junior College of Toyota (1990–1999)
- Ohkagakuen University – Toyota campus
- Toyota National College of Technology

=== Primary and secondary education ===
Toyota has 78 public elementary schools and 27 public middle schools operated by the city government and 12 public high schools operated by the Aichi Prefectural Board of Education. There are also two private middle schools and eight private high schools. The prefecture also operates two special education schools for the disabled.

=== International schools ===
- Escola Alegria de Saber – Brazilian school
- Escola NECTAR – Brazilian primary school
- Escola Pintando o Sete – Brazilian primary school

== Transportation ==
Toyota, as the home city of Toyota Motor Corporation is well-served by expressways and national highways. However, it was the largest city in Japan which was not served by the Japanese National Railways (JNR) during its existence. The closest Shinkansen station is Mikawa-Anjō Station in the city of Anjō, although the limited-stop Nozomi and Hikari services do not stop there.

=== Railways ===
==== Conventional lines ====
Meitetsu

- Toyota Line: Umetsubo – Kamitoyota – Jōsui
- Mikawa Line: Sanage – Hiratobashi – Koshido – Umetsubo – Toyotashi – Uwagoromo – Tsuchihashi – Takemura – Wakabayashi – Mikawa Yatsuhashi

Aichi Loop Railway

- Aichi Loop Line: Mikawa-Kamigō – Ekaku – Suenohara – Mikawa-Toyota – Shin-Uwagoromo – Shin-Toyota – Aikan-Umetsubo – Shigō – Kaizu – Homi – Sasabara – Yakusa

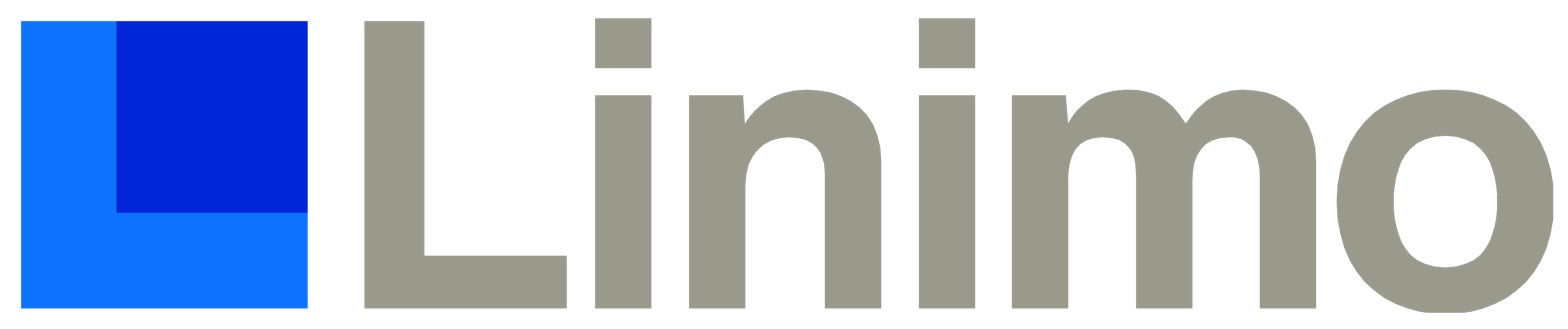
Linimo

- Aichi High-Speed Transit: Tōji-shiryōkan-minami – Yakusa

=== Roads ===
==== Expressways ====
- Tōmei Expressway
- Shin-Tōmei Expressway
- Isewangan Expressway
- Tōkai-Kanjō Expressway

==== Japan National Route ====
- National Route 153
- National Route 155
- National Route 248
- National Route 301
- National Route 419
- National Route 420
- National Route 257
- National Route 473
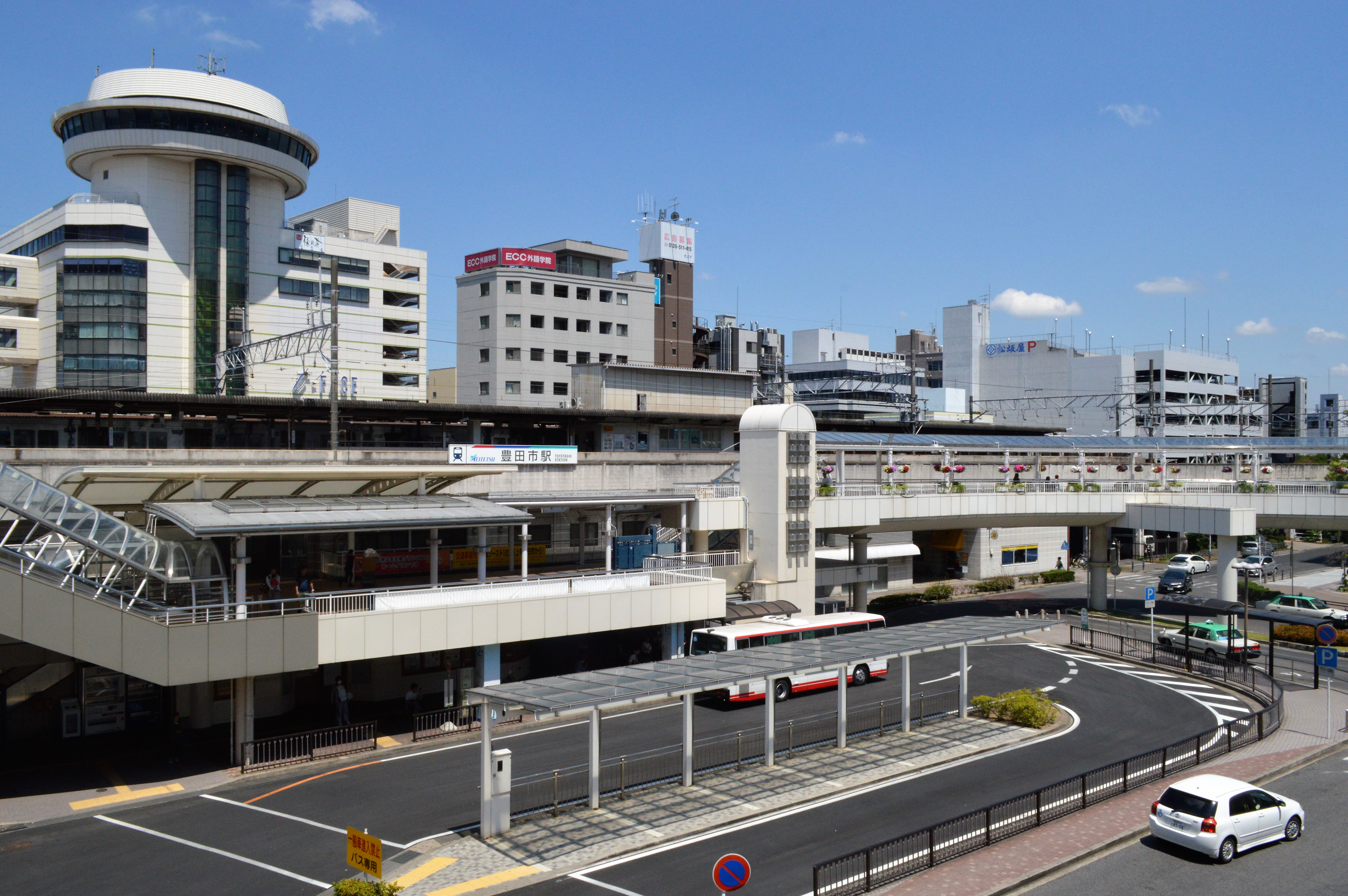
Toyotashi Station

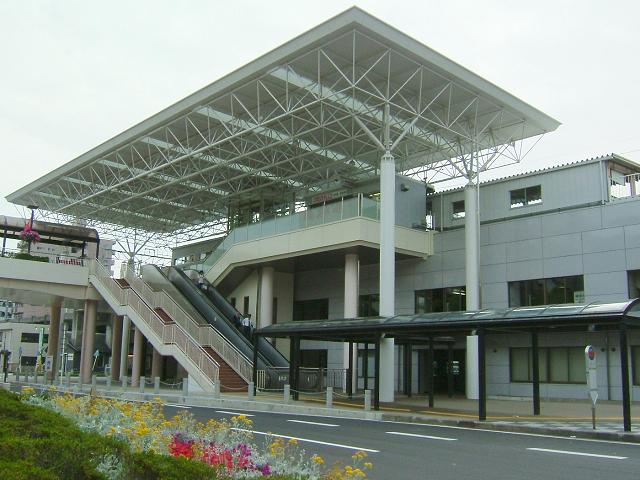
Shin-Toyota Station

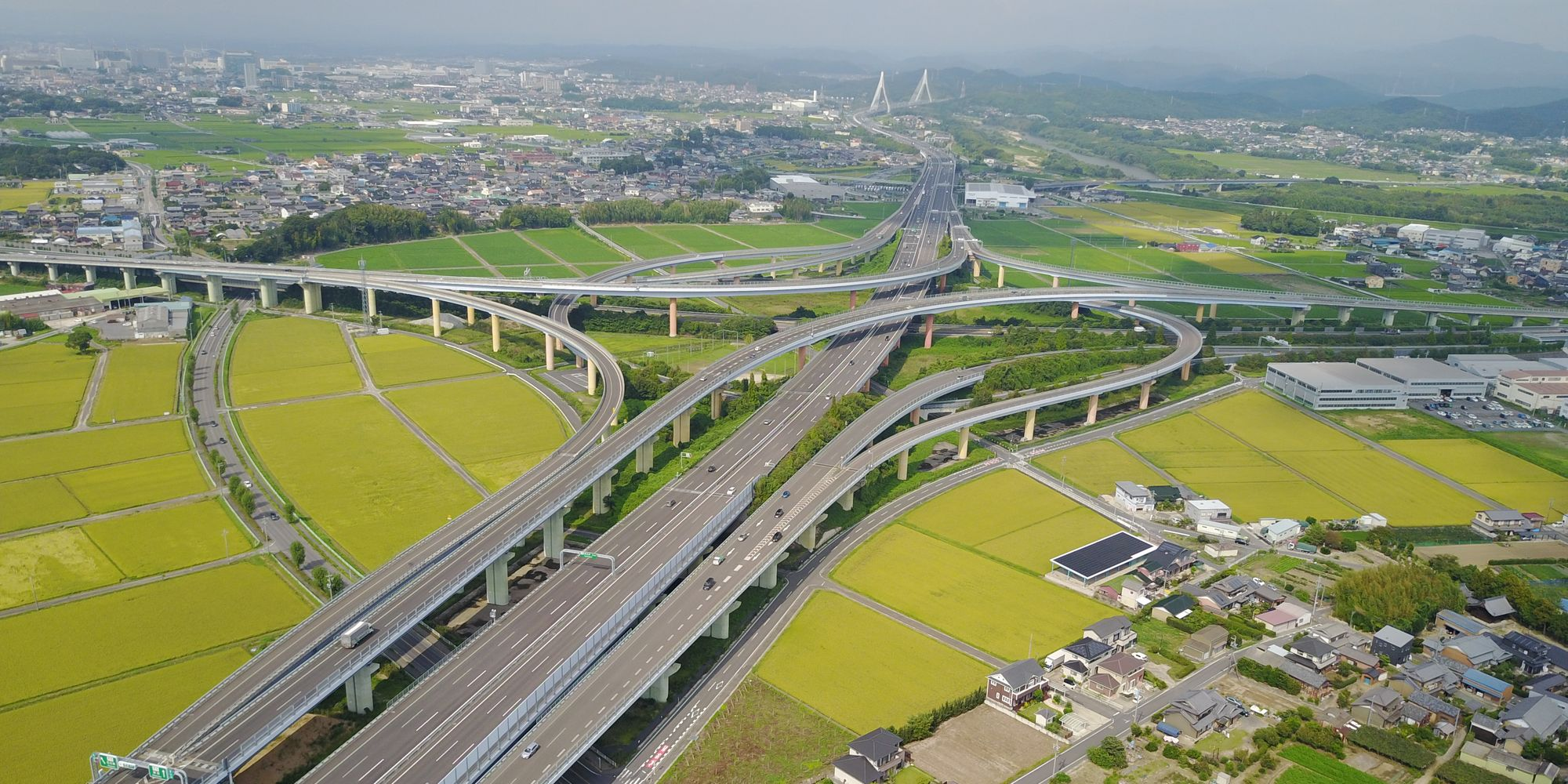
Toyota JCT

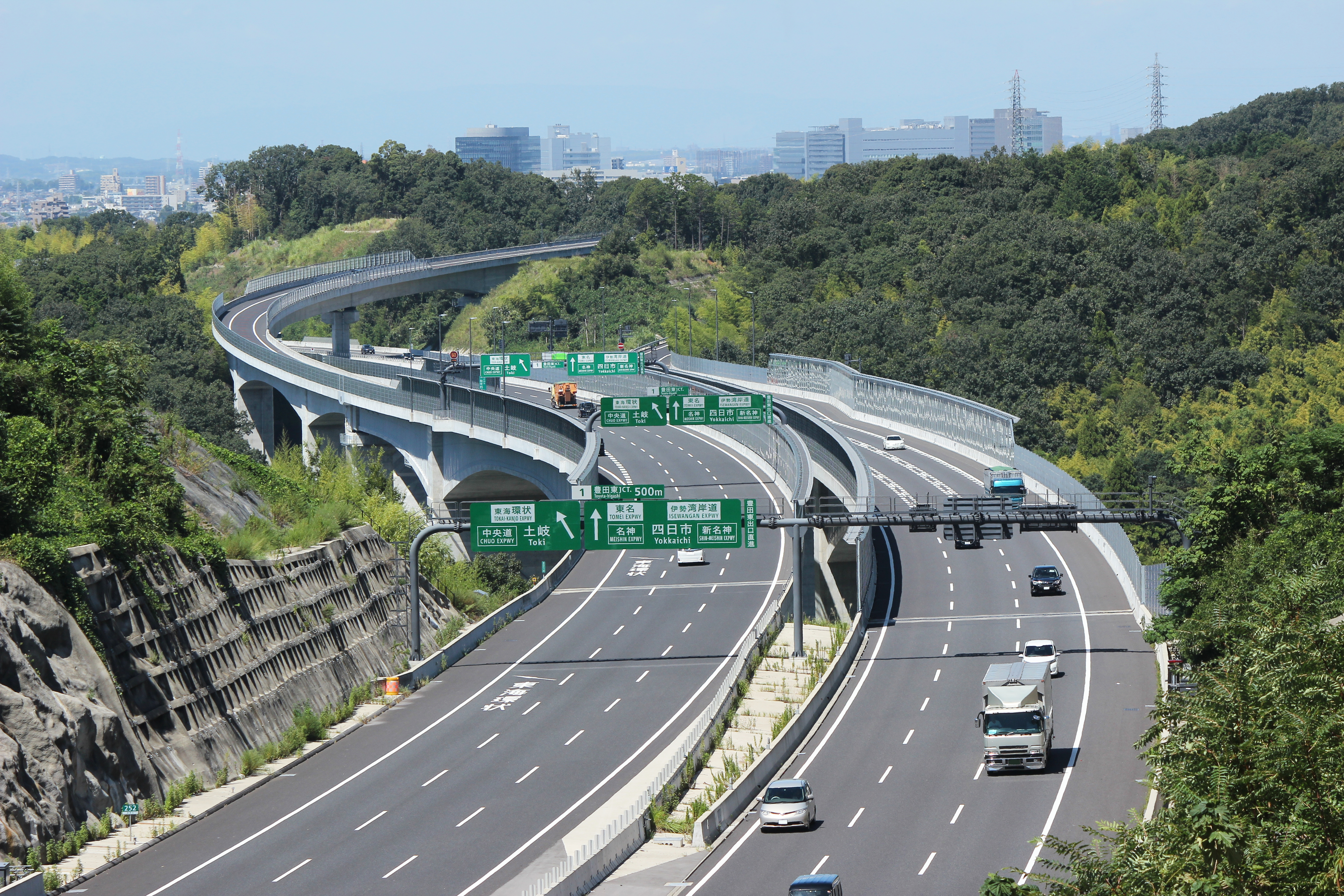
Toyota-Higashi JCT

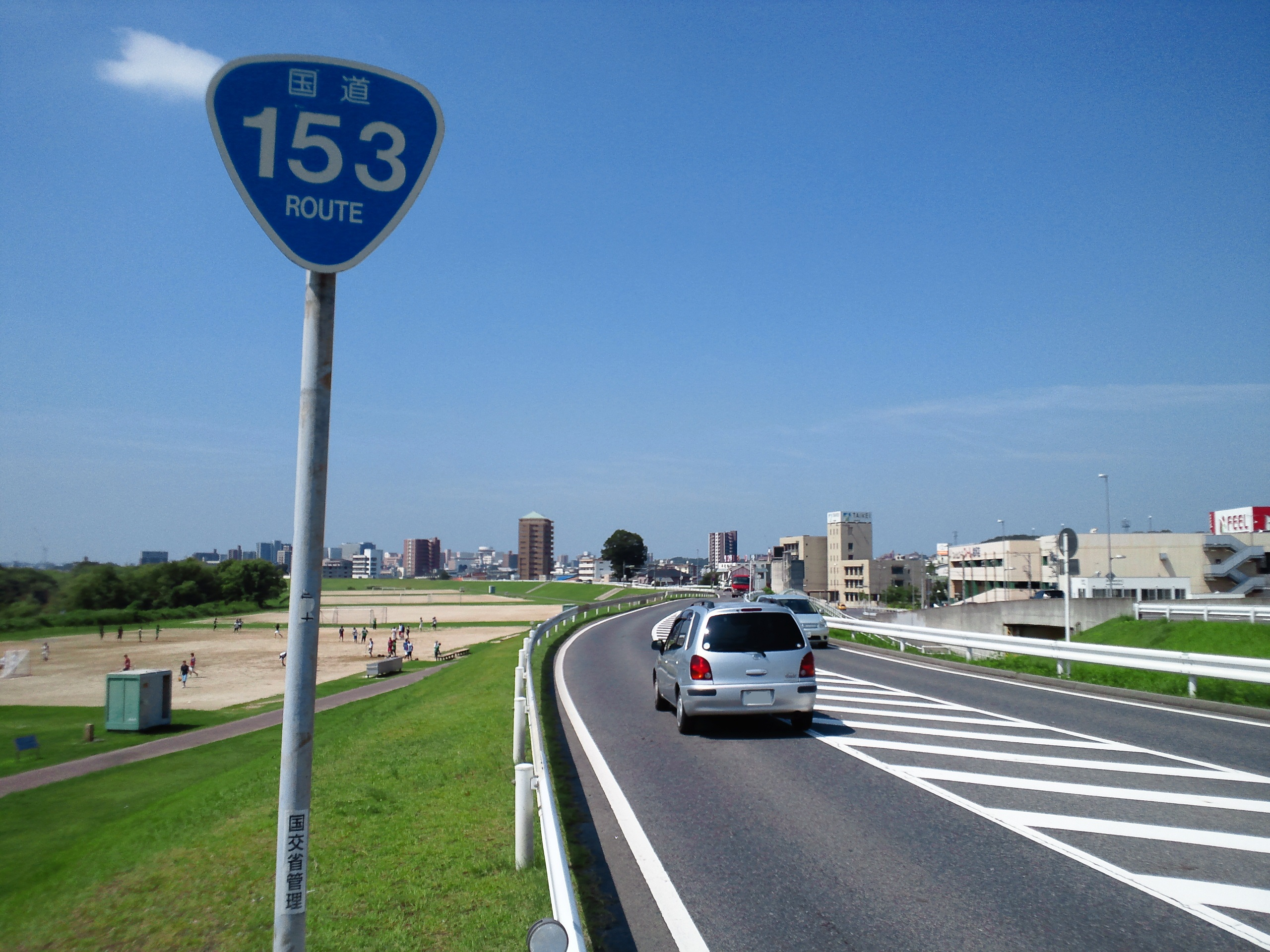
National Route 153

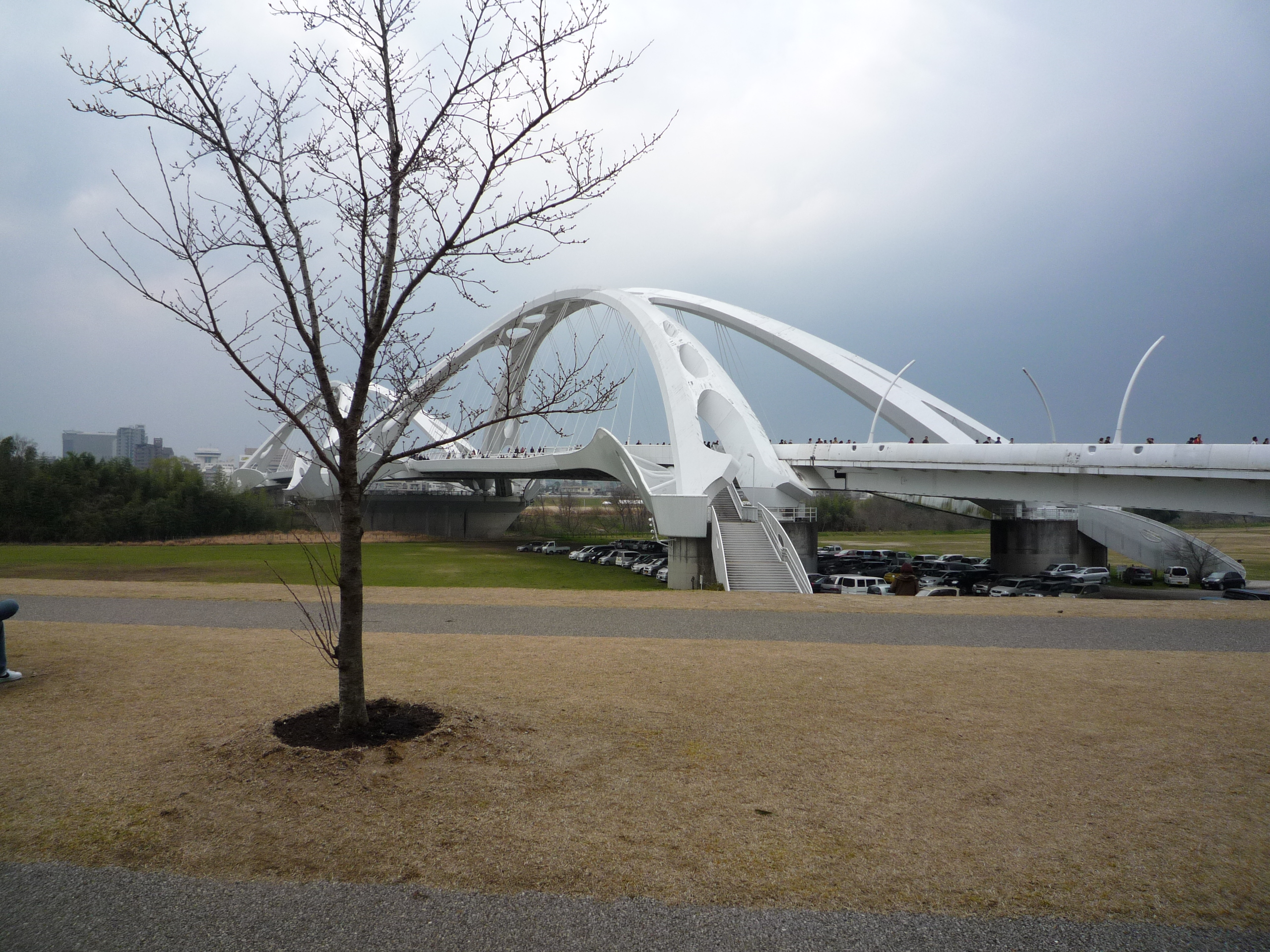
Toyota big bridge

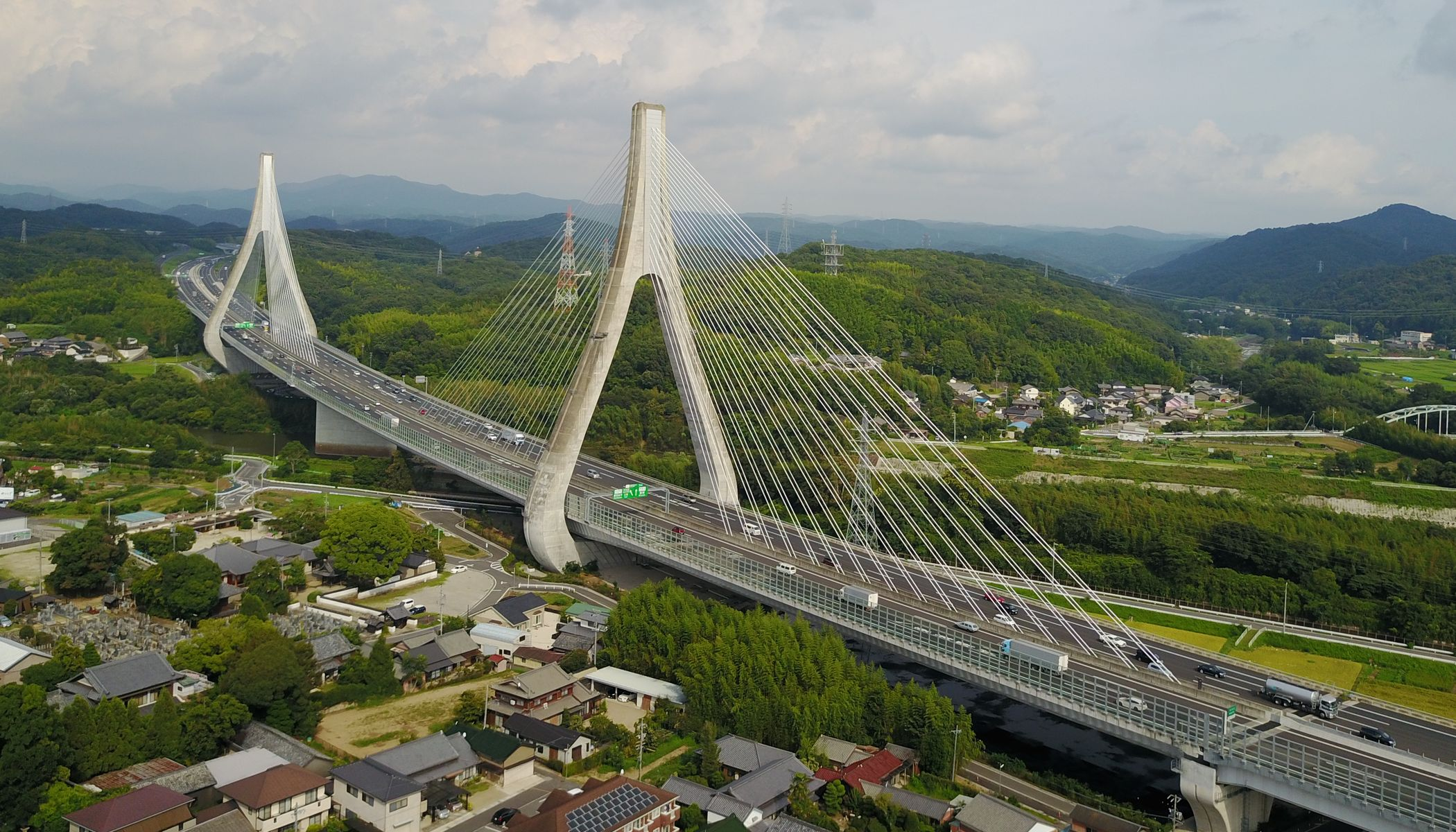
Toyota Arrows Bridge

== Local attractions ==
- Asuke area (Groups of Traditional Buildings)
- Kampachi Gorge
- Kōrankei Gorge
- Kuragaike park
- The ruins of Matsudaira
- Obara shikizakura
- Toyota Automobile Museum
- Toyota Kaikan Exhibition Hall
- Toyota Kuragaike Commemorative Hall
- Toyota Municipal Museum of Art
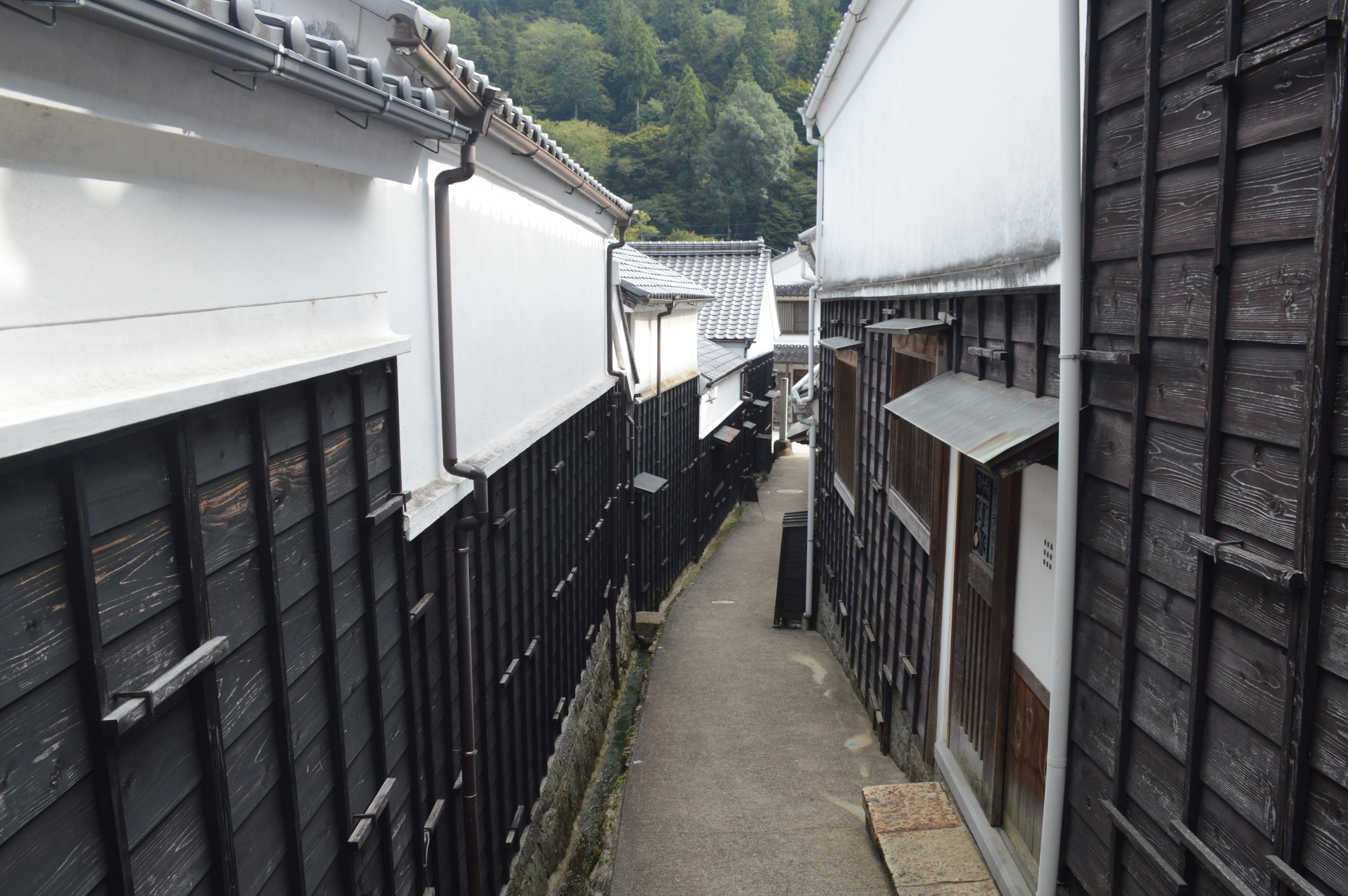
Asuke area

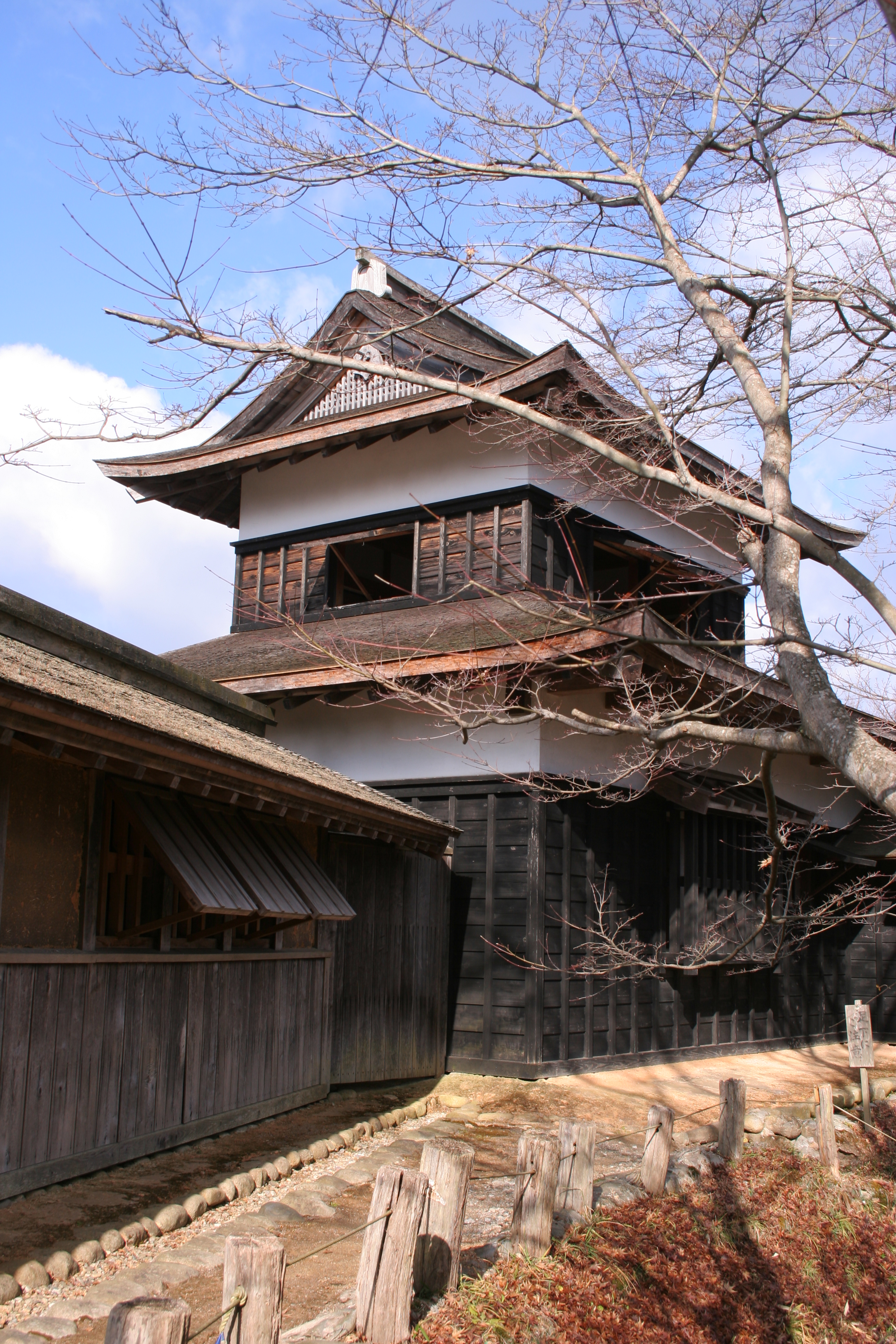
Asuke Castle

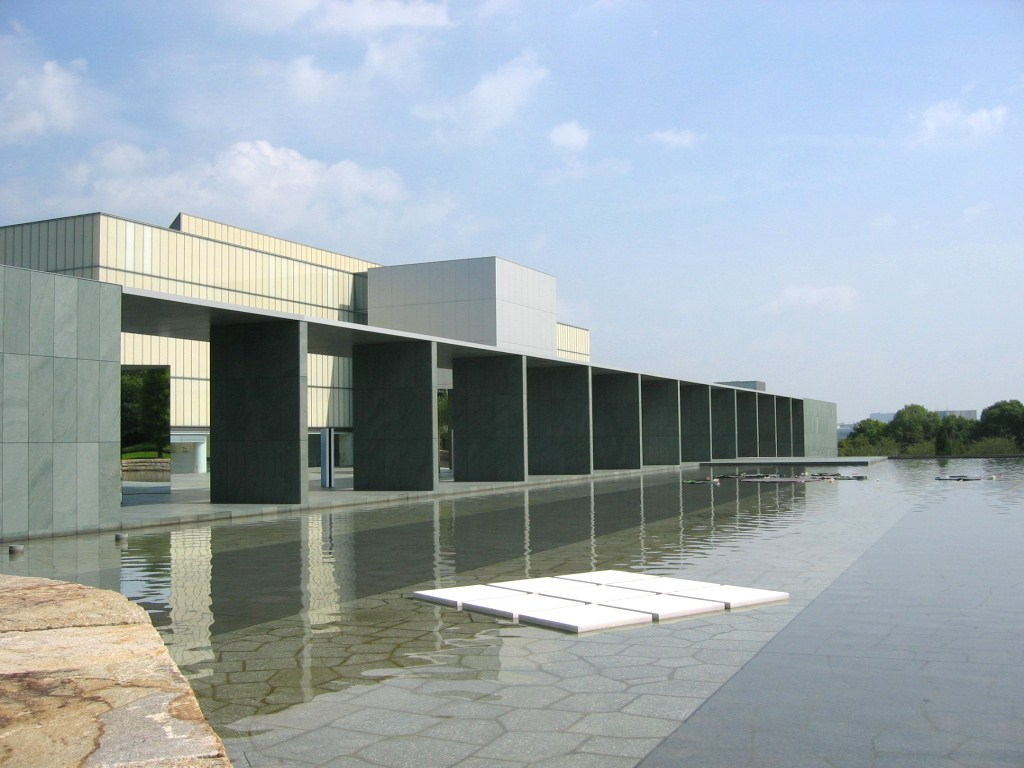
Toyota Municipal Museum of Art

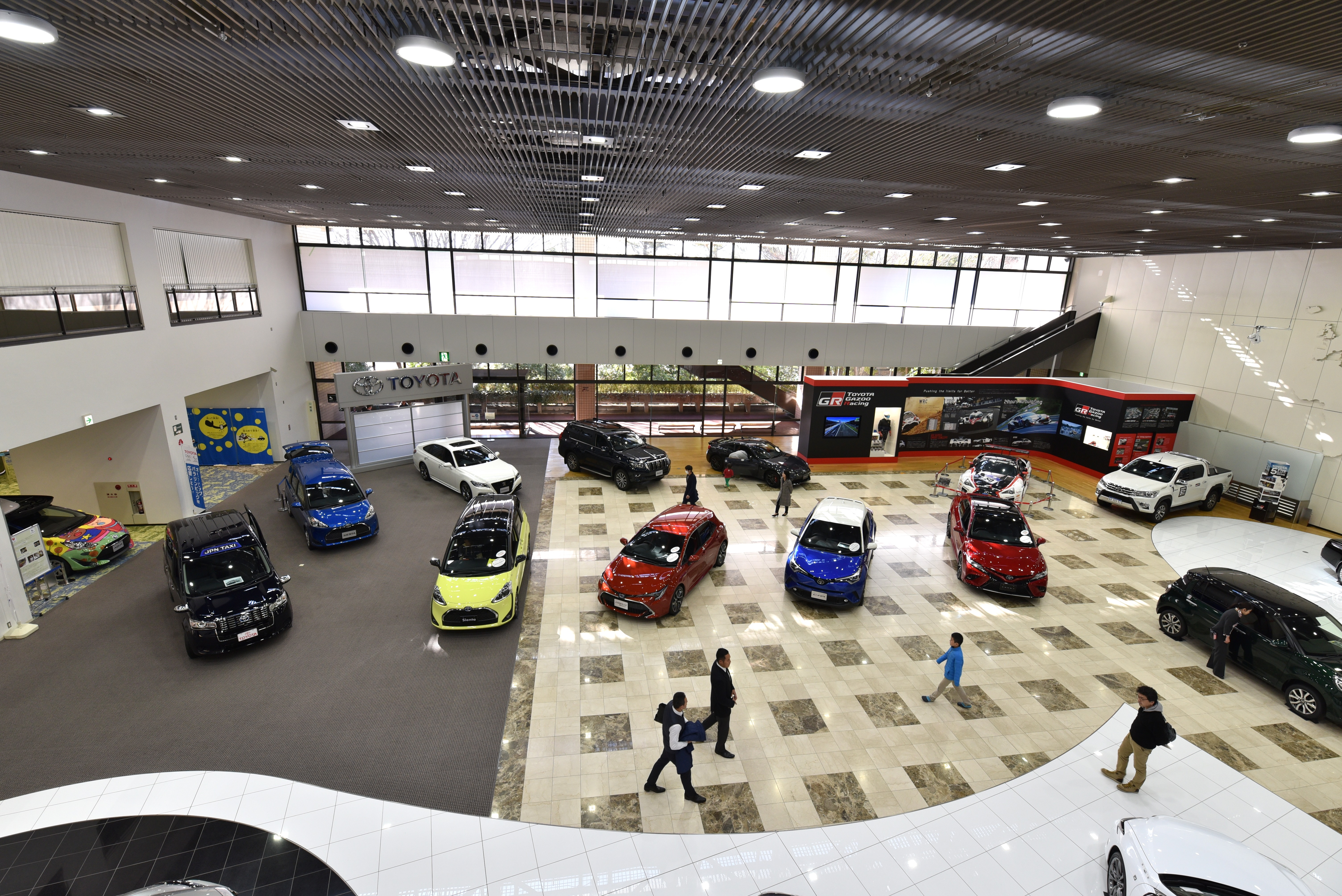
Toyota Kaikan Exhibition Hall

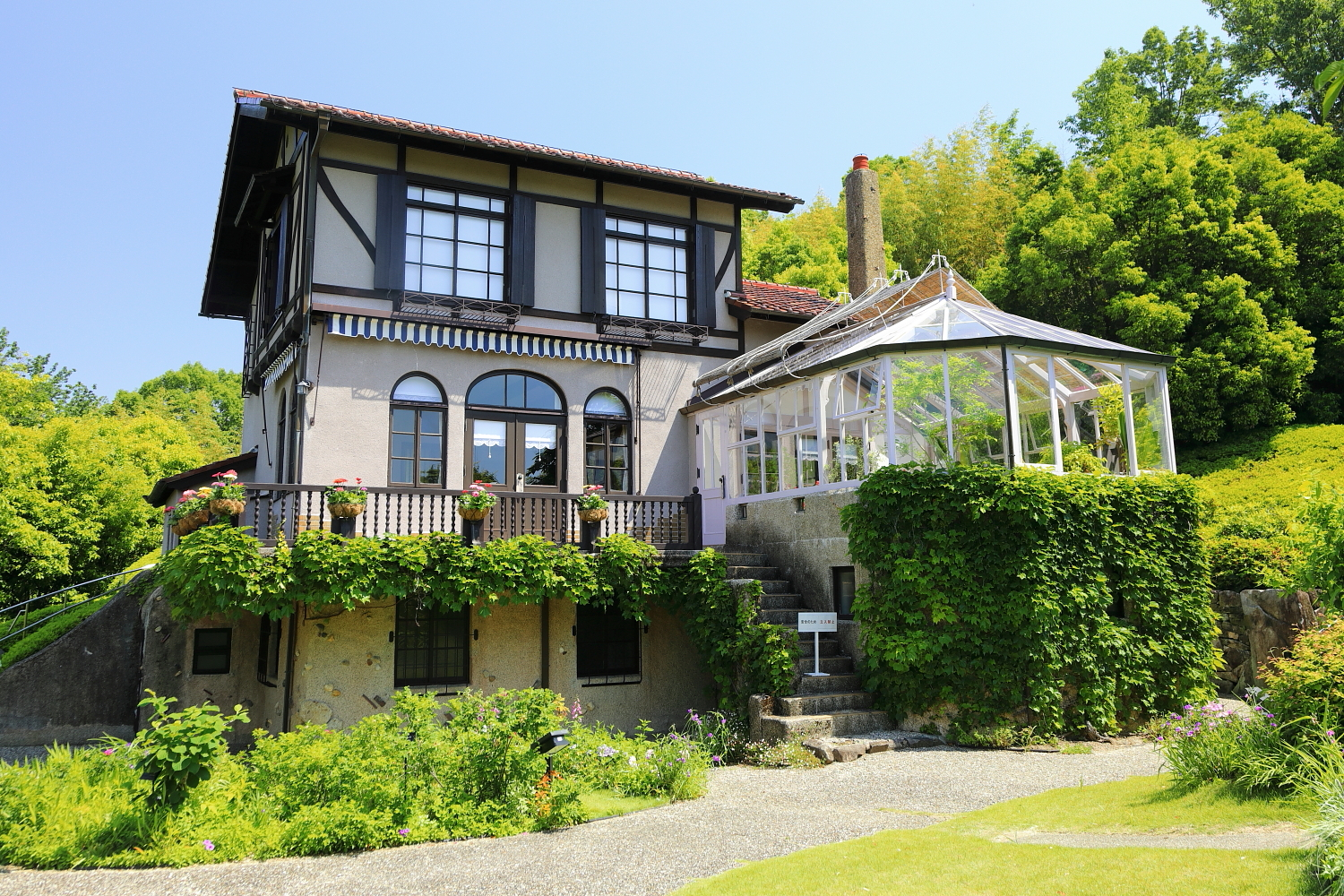
Toyota Kuragaike Commemorative Hall

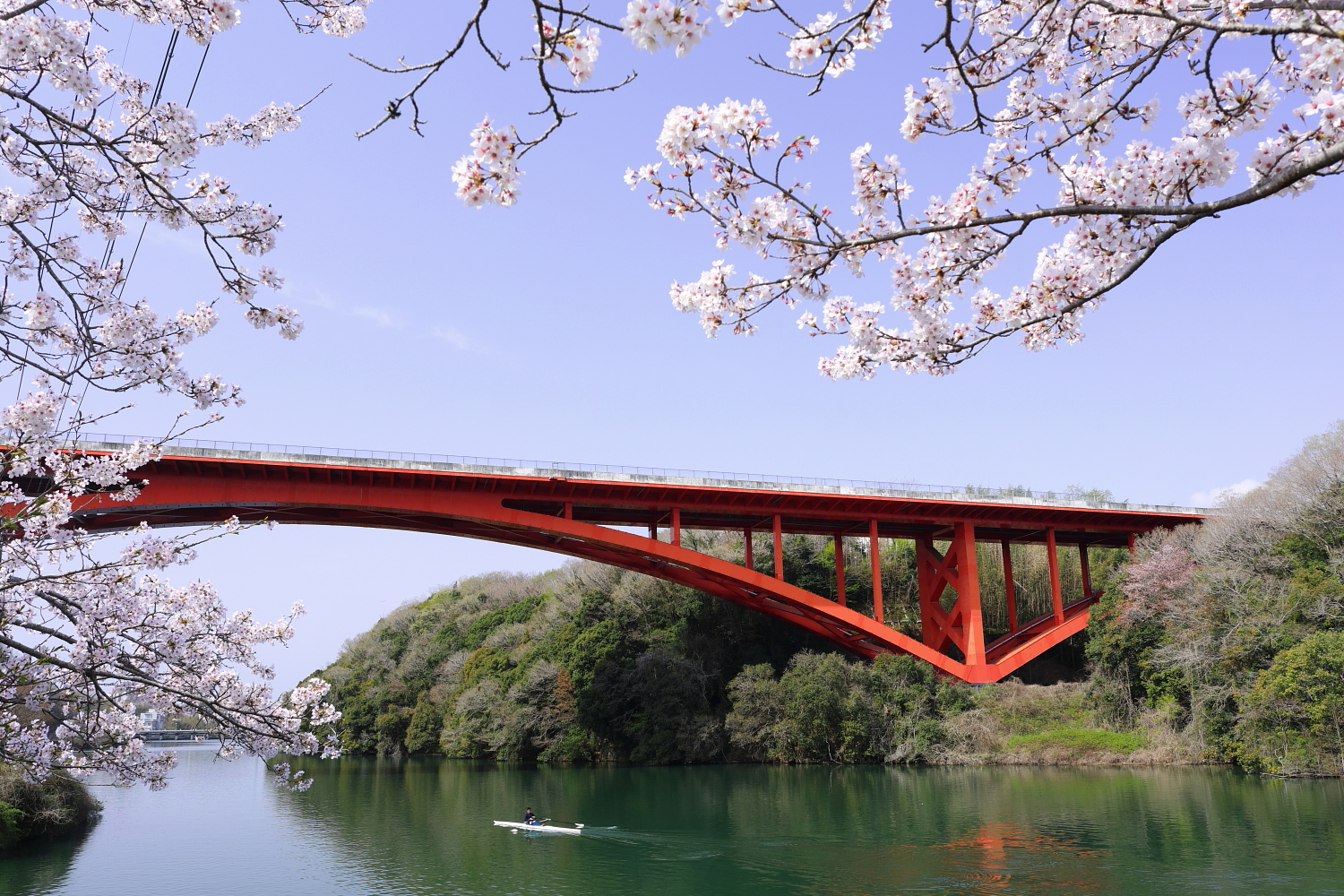
Kampachi Gorge

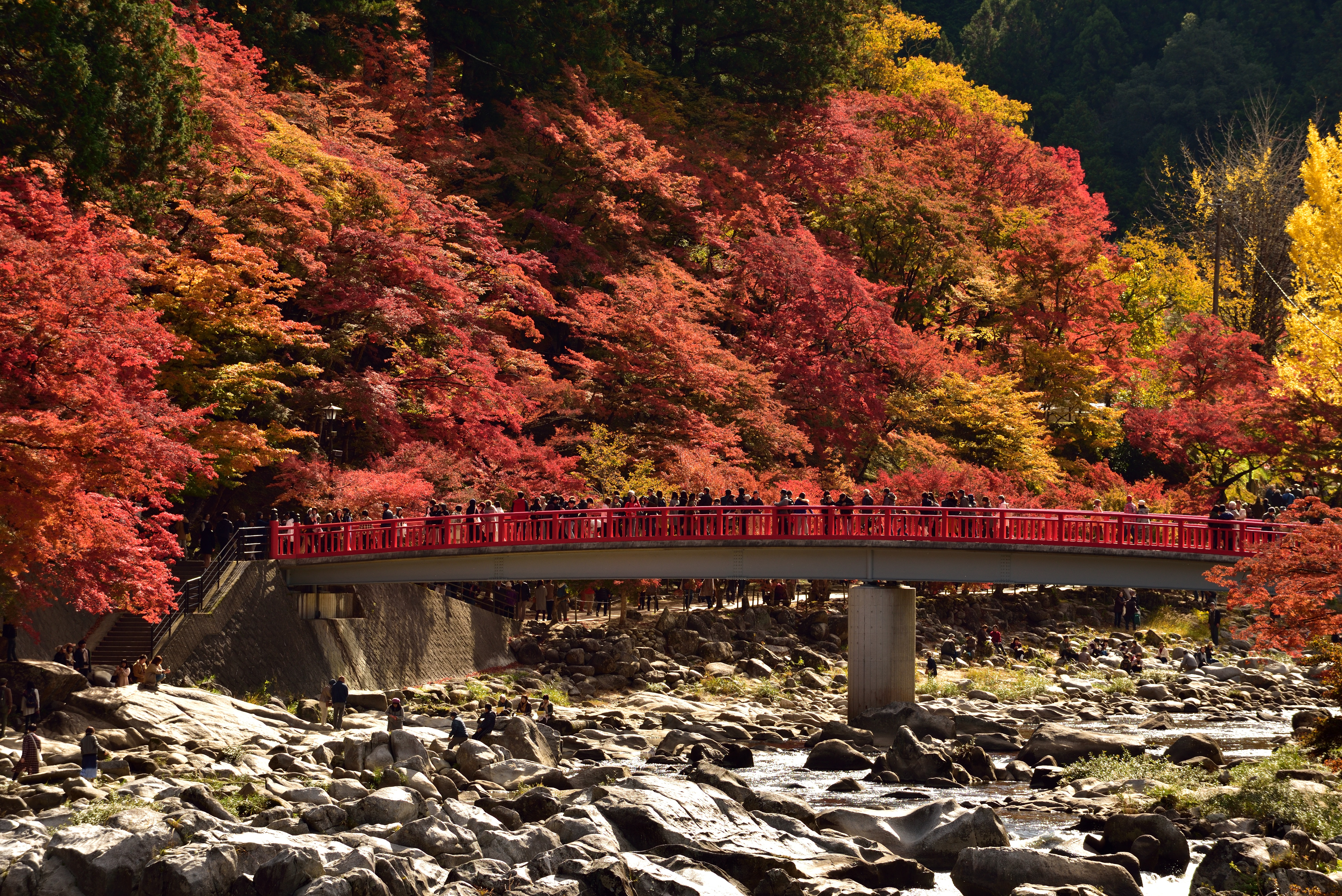
Kōrankei Gorge

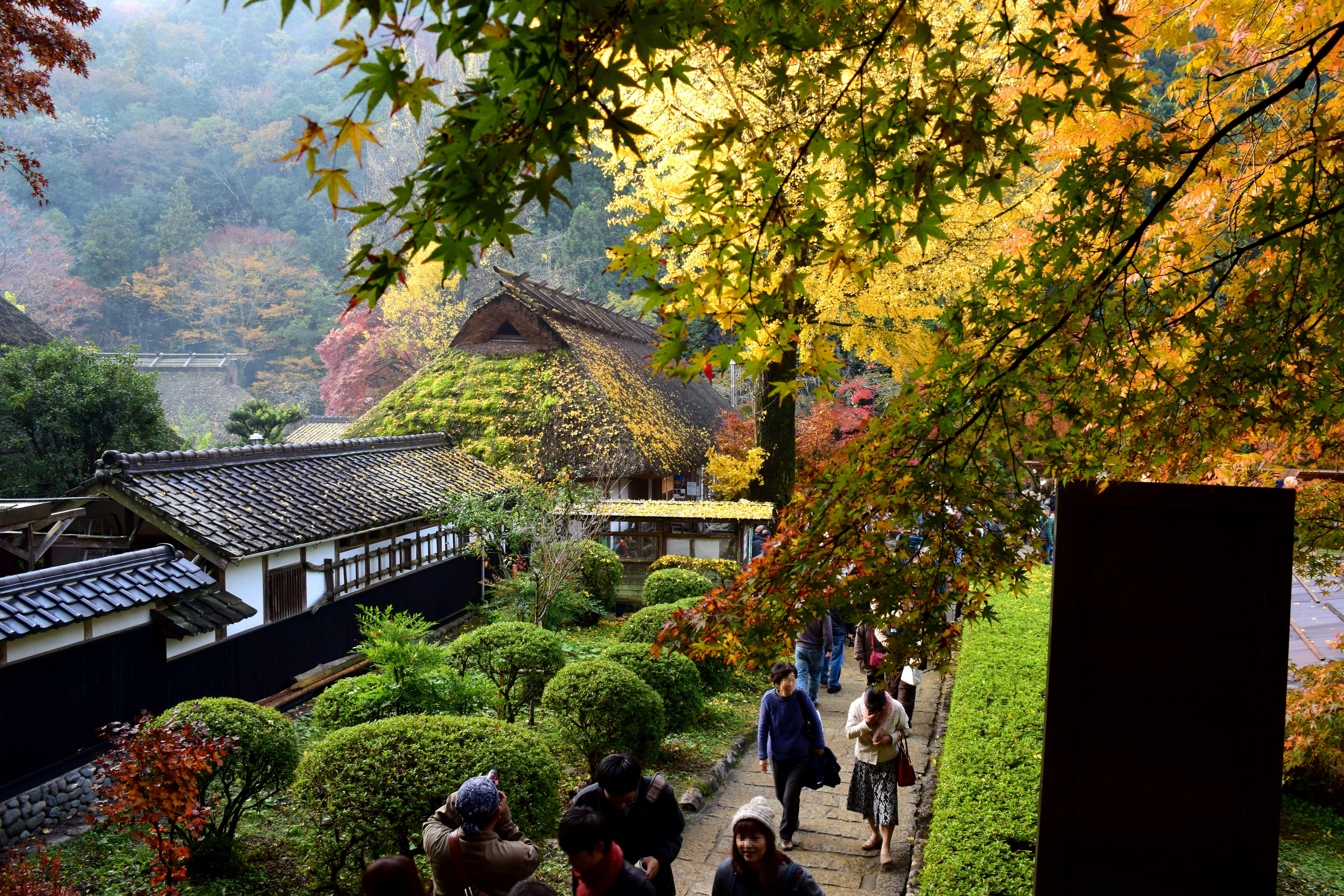
Sanshu Asuke Yashiki

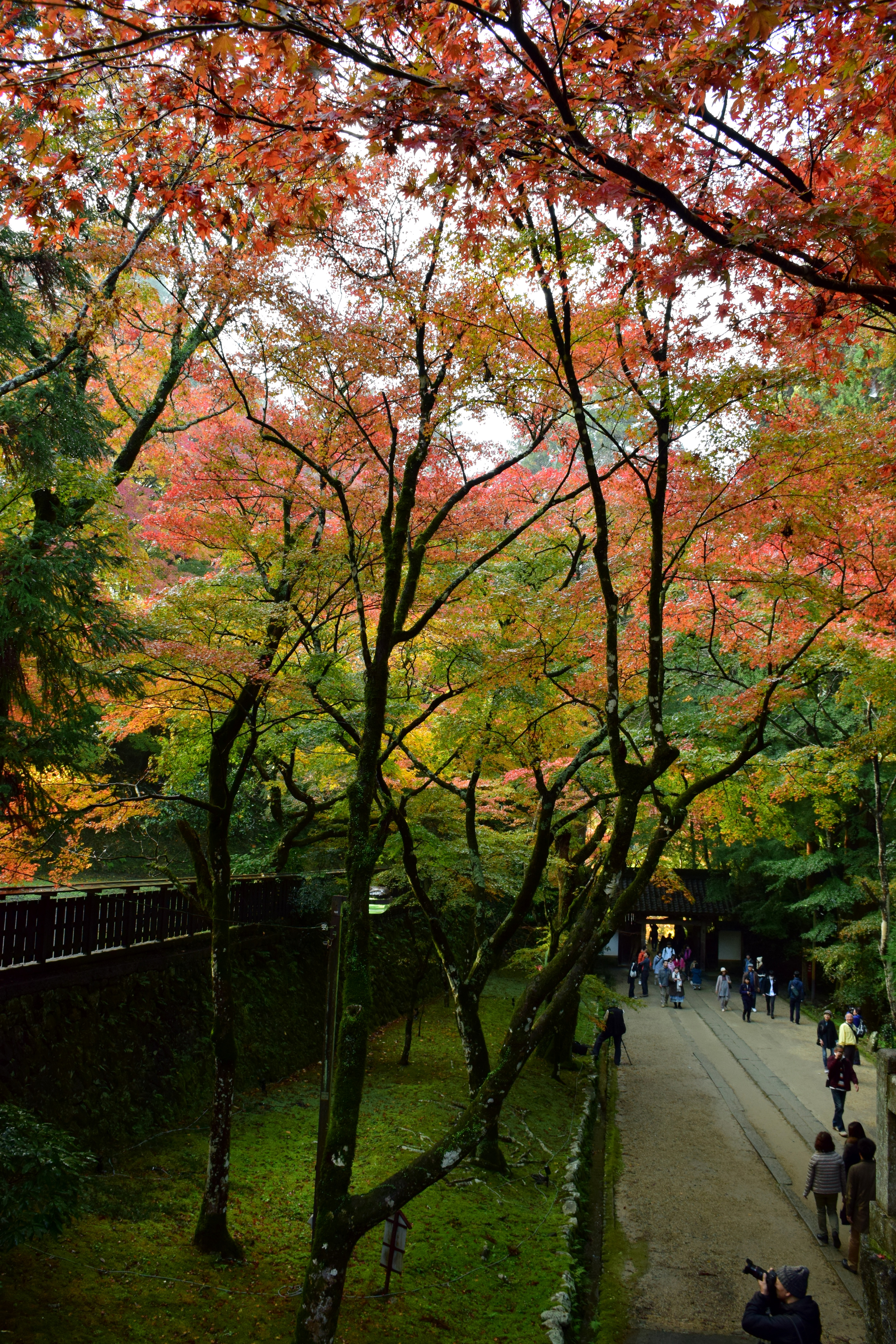
Kōjaku-ji

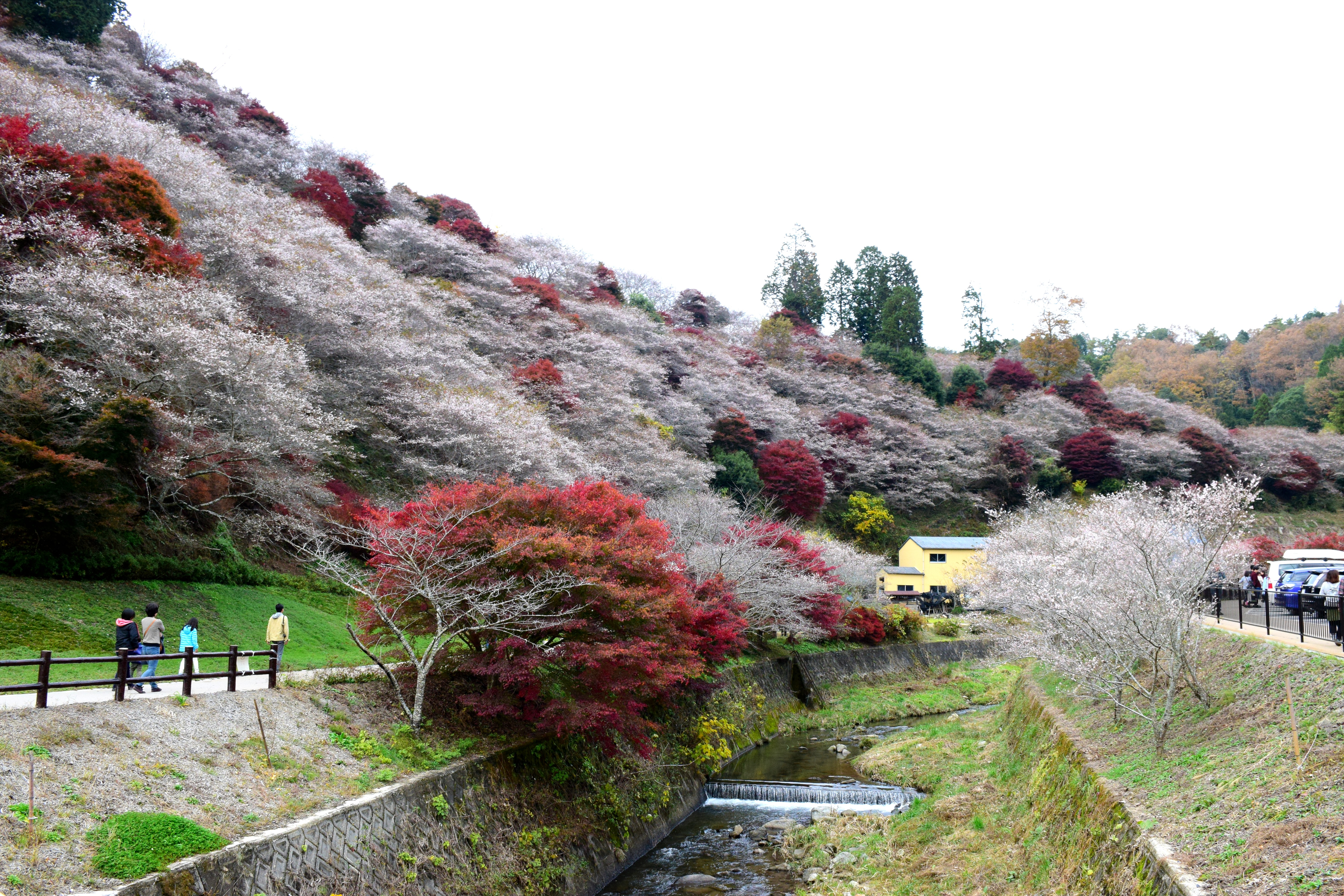
Obara shikizakura

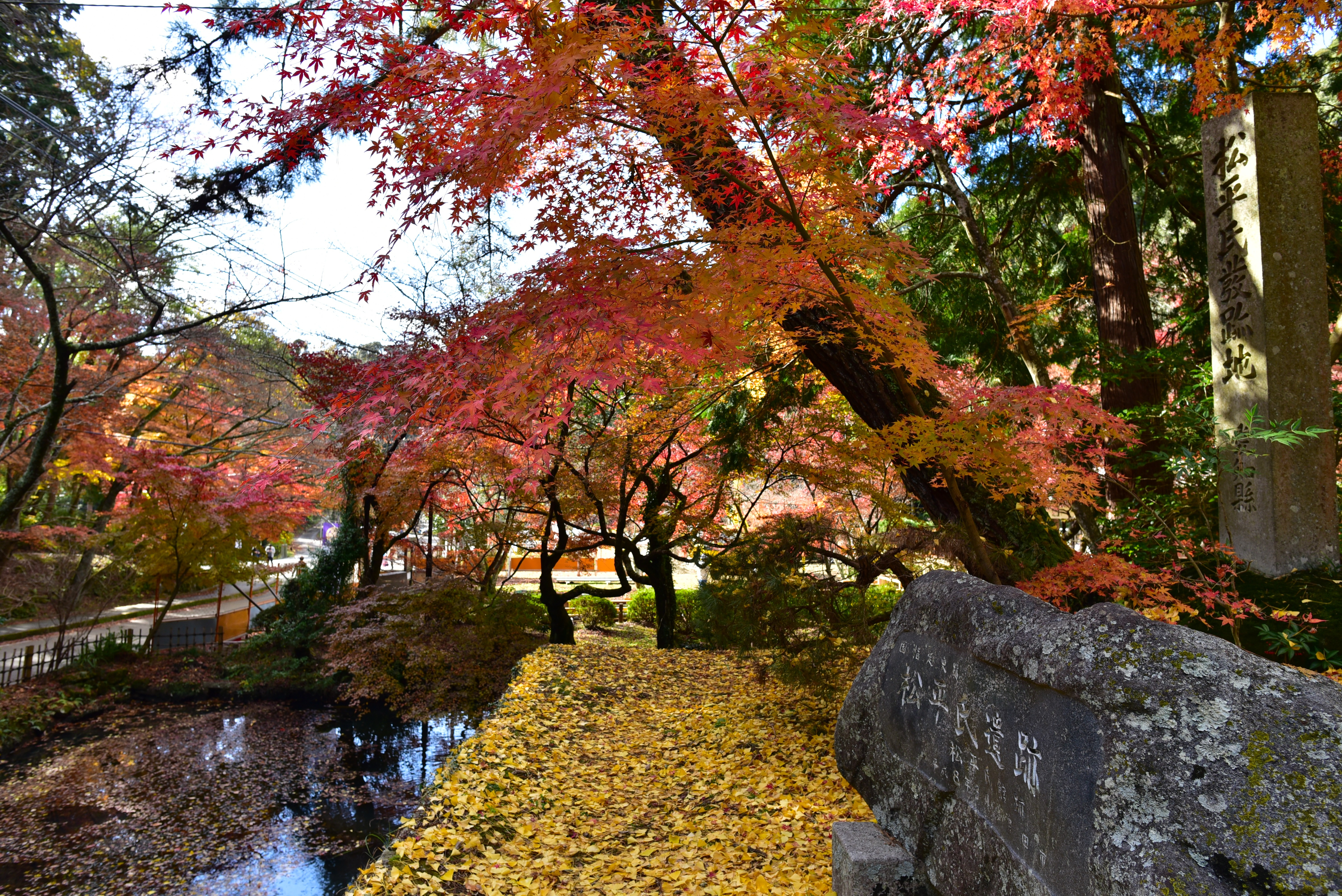
The ruins of Matsudaira

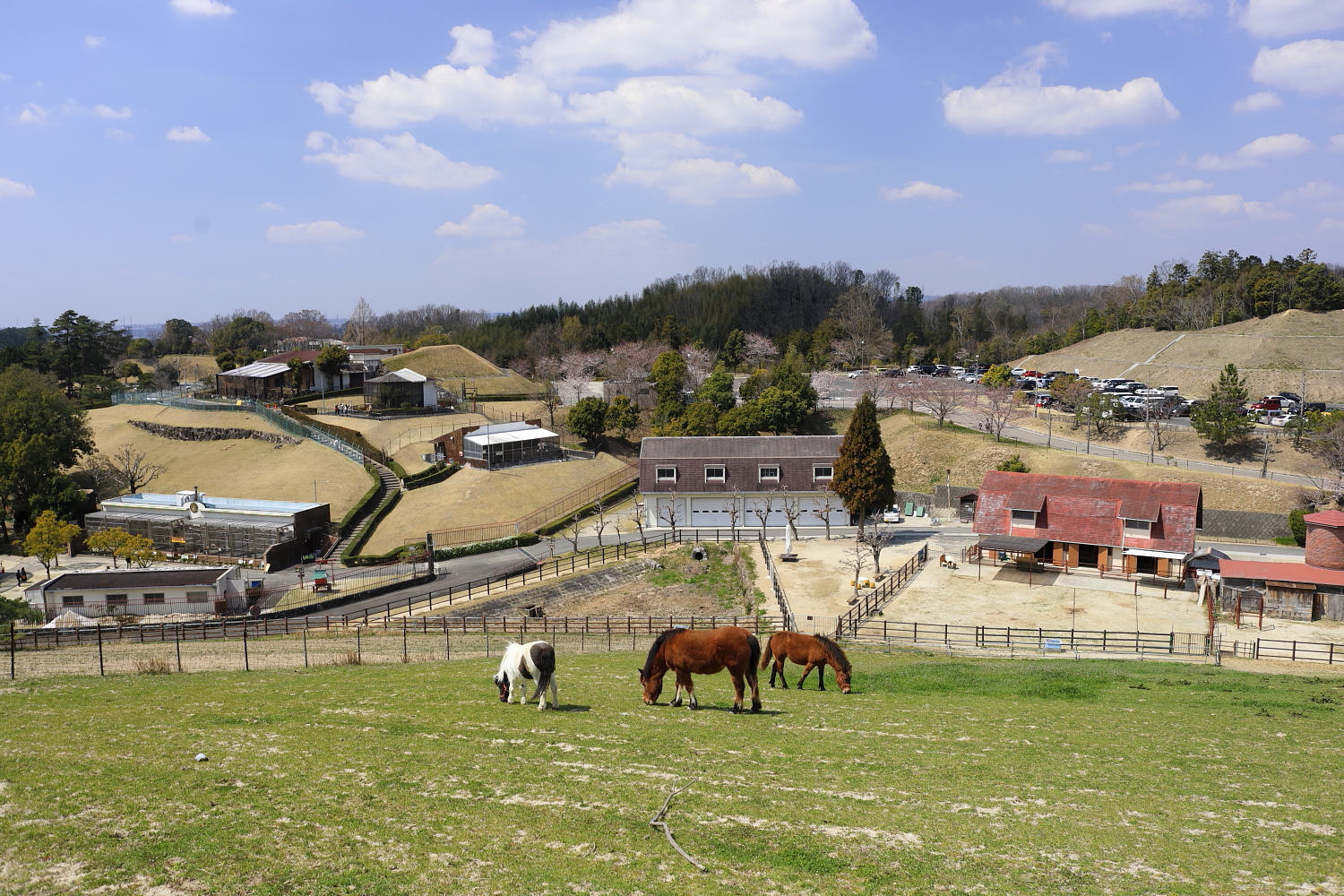
Kuragaike park

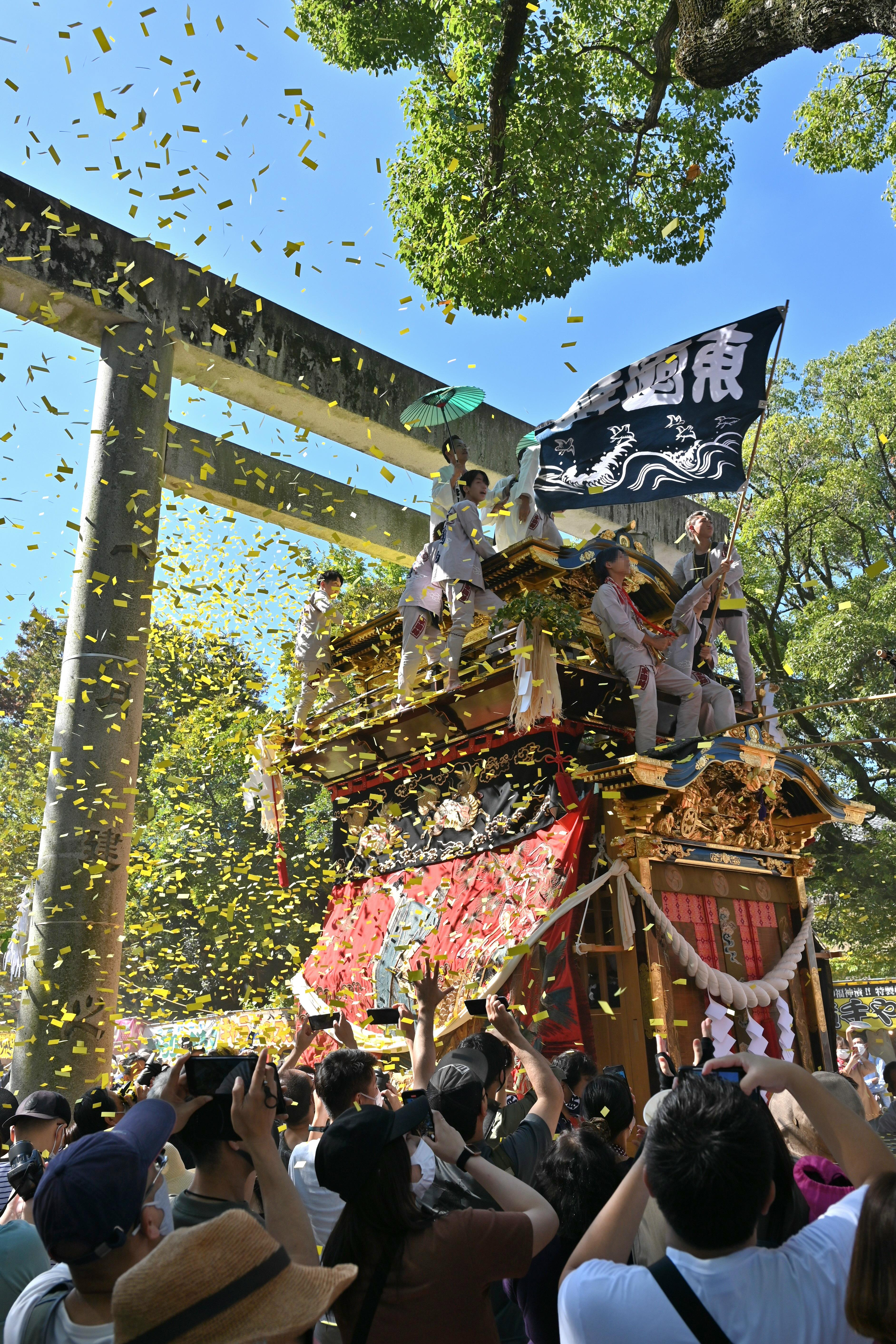
Koromo Festival

== Culture ==
=== Sports ===
==== Sports Team ====
Sex	Name	competition	League	Home	Sponsor	Since
Men	Toyota Verblitz	Rugby	Japan Rugby League One	Toyota Sports Center	Toyota	1941
Men	Toyota Sunhawks	Volleyball	V.League (V2)	Toyota Sports Center	Toyota	1946
Men	Toyota Baseball club	Baseball	Japan Amateur Baseball Association (JABA)	Toyota Sports Center	Toyota	1947
Women	Toyota Red Terriers	Softball	Japan Softball League (JSL)	Toyota Sports Center	Toyota	1948
Women	Toyota Sunpiena	Volleyball	V.League (V2)	Toyota Sports Center	Toyota	1950
Men	Toyota Griffins	Handball	Japan Handball League (JHL・Challenge Division)	Toyota Sports Center	Toyota	1970
Men	Kirix Toyota Bull Fighters	American football	X-League	Toyota Athletic Stadium	Kirix Group	1974
Men	Toyota Tsusho BLUE WING	Rugby	TOP West League	Fujioka Ground	Toyota Tsusho	1980
Men	Nagoya Grampus	Association football	J.League (J1)	Toyota Stadium	Nagoya Grampus Eight Inc.	1991

==== Sports Facilities ====
- Sky Hall Toyota
- Toyota Athletic Stadium
- Toyota Sports Center
- Toyota Stadium

== Notable people from Toyota ==
- Miliyah Kato, singer
- Yoshio Markino, artist, author
- Masami Mitsuoka, singer
- Masato Naito, Olympic hurdler
- Etsuko Nishio, singer, actress
- Suzuki Shōsan, Edo period Zen prelate
- Tadashi Sugiura, professional baseball player
- Katsuaki Watanabe, former president of Toyota Motors
- Yoshiko Nagata, famous comedian
