= Naka-Okazaki Station =

Railway station in Okazaki, Aichi Prefecture, Japan

Naka-Okazaki Station 中岡崎駅
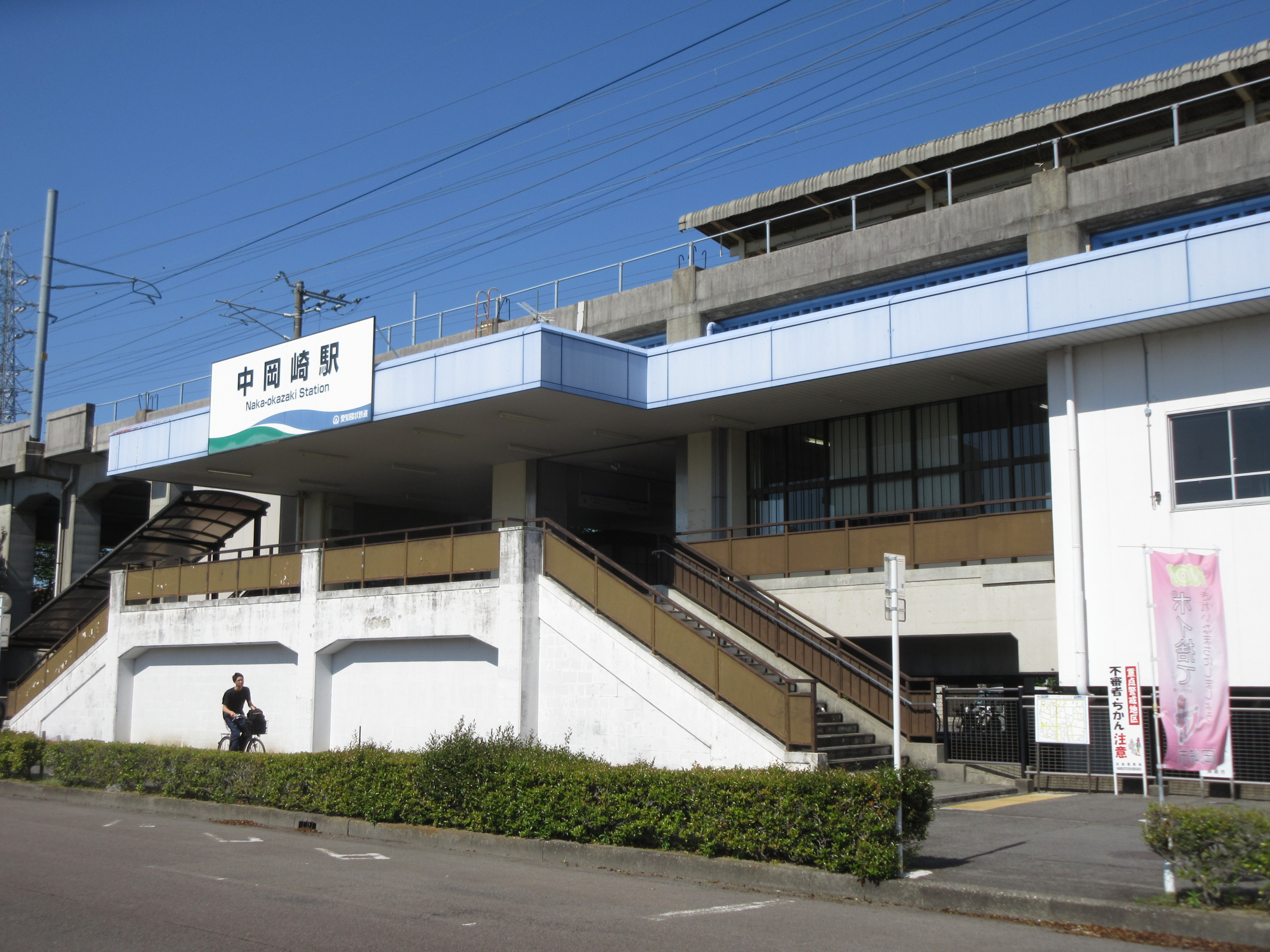
- Naka-Okazaki Station in May 2019

General information
- Location: 15 Nakaokazakichō, Okazaki-shi, Aichi-ken 444-0921; Japan
- Coordinates: 34.9562°N 137.1532°E
- Operator: Aichi Loop Railway
- Line: ■ Aichi Loop Line
- Distance: 3.4 kilometers from Okazaki
- Platforms: 2 side platforms

Other information
- Status: Staffed
- Station code: 03
- Website: Official website

History
- Opened: April 26, 1976

Passengers
- FY2017: 1915 daily
Location
- Location within Aichi Prefecture Location within Japan

Naka-Okazaki Station (中岡崎駅, Naka-Okazaki-eki) is a railway station in the city of Okazaki, Aichi Prefecture, Japan, operated by the third sector Aichi Loop Railway Company.

== Lines ==
Naka-Okazaki Station is served by the Aichi Loop Line, and is located 3.4 kilometers from the starting point of the line at Okazaki.

== Station layout ==
The station has a two elevated opposed side platforms, with the station building located underneath. The station building has automated ticket machines, TOICA automated turnstiles and is staffed.

=== Platforms ===
1	■ Aichi Loop Line	for Okazaki
2	■ Aichi Loop Line	for Mikawa-Toyota and Kōzōji

== Adjacent stations ==
«	Service	»
Aichi Loop Line
Mutsuna	-	Kita-Okazaki

== Station history ==
Naka-Okazaki Station was opened on April 26, 1976 as a passenger station on the Japan National Railways (JNR) Okata Line connecting Okazaki with Shin-Toyota. At the time, the station had a single side platform. With the privatization of the JNR on April 1, 1987, the station came under control of JR Central. The station was transferred to the third sector Aichi Loop Railway Company on January 31, 1988.

== Passenger statistics ==
In fiscal 2017, the station was used by an average of 1915 passengers daily.

== Surrounding area ==
- Okazaki Castle
- Japan National Route 1

== See also ==
- List of railway stations in Japan
