= Shuttle train =

Train that runs between two points over a short route

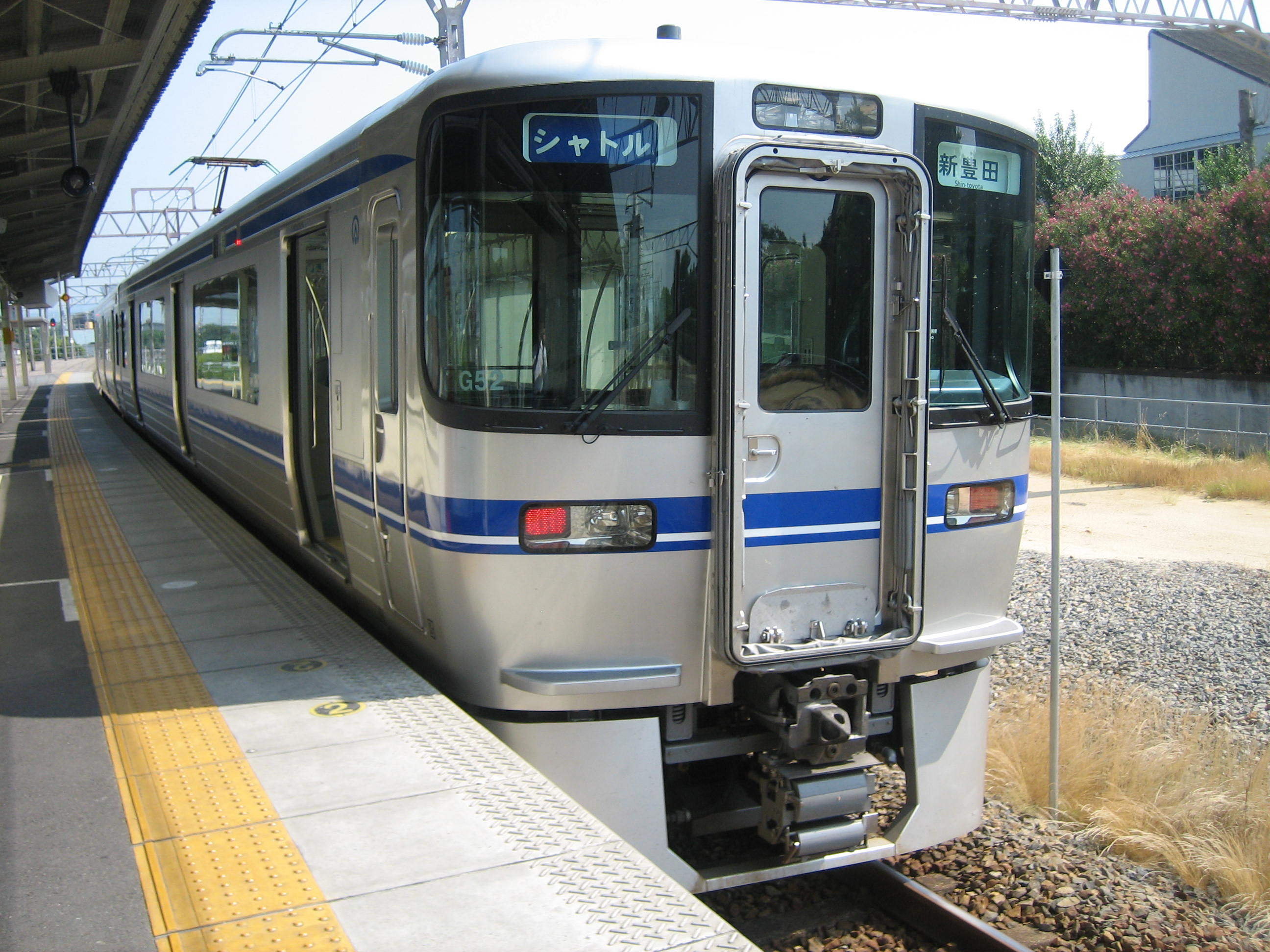
The Aichi Loop Line shuttle train at Mikawa-Toyota station, Toyota, Aichi Prefecture, Japan

A shuttle train is a railway service that runs back and forth over a short route between two places. They are used in various ways in different parts of the world, to carry passengers, freight (Note: Including accompanied cars, buses and lorries.) or both.

Passenger trains are generally one of two types:

- a branch line or other short distance line, generally with frequent services, where trains travel back & forth over the short line; or
- a supplementary service to cater for high passenger numbers on a short portion of a railway line, either during rush hours or other specified times, such as before or after major events.

== Airport shuttle trains ==
Airport shuttles run between an airport terminal and one or more other locations, such as another terminal, a railway station or car park; often a combination of these locations. They are generally in the form of a driverless people mover or automated guideway transit (AGT); examples include:

=== Italy ===
- Pisa: A shuttle train connects Pisa Aeroporto with Pisa Centrale. The journey takes five minutes.

=== United Kingdom ===
- Gatwick Airport; Gatwick Airport Shuttle Transit is a people mover used to transfer passengers between the North and South Terminals, in West Sussex, England. The journey takes two minutes.

=== United States ===
- Oakland, California: Oakland Airport Connector is an AGT system which connects Oakland San Francisco Bay Airport terminal to Coliseum station, an interchange station on the Bay Area Rapid Transit (BART) rapid transit system.
- New Jersey: AirTrain Newark is a 3-mile (4.8 km) automated people mover at Newark Liberty International Airport. It connects terminals with car parks and its railway station, where passengers can interchange for Amtrak and NJ Transit rail services.

== Commuter shuttle trains ==
A shuttle train may also be used to carry commuters, especially if at least one of the shuttle train's stations is an interchange:

=== Austria ===
- National Intermodal Network Austria: operated by Rail Cargo Austria, it uses a hub-and-spoke system of shuttle trains to provide overnight links between the highest volume intermodal freight terminals in Austria. The hub of the network is located at Wels.

=== Bangladesh ===
- The Chattogram University shuttle train is operated by Bangladesh Railway eastern division and monitored by university authority. Trains leave Chattogram and Sholoshohor; city-bound trains leave Chattogram University.

=== China ===
- The Line 6 of the Suzhou Metro operates a shuttle service between Nanxiebu and Sangtiandao.

=== Hong Kong ===
- The MTR Disneyland Resort line is a themed shuttle line, linking the Hong Kong Disneyland Resort with the rest of the network. Another shuttle train runs between the Tseung Kwan O and LOHAS Park stations, on a spur serving a new residential development.

=== Japan ===
- Tokyo: The Tobu Daishi Line is a 1.0 km (0.6 mi) railway line, where trains operate every 10 minutes with Nishiarai Station being an interchange to the Tobu Skytree Line.
- Nagoya: During the morning rush hour, a supplementary shuttle train on the Aichi Loop Line operates between Mikawa-Toyota Station and Shin-Toyota Station; this caters for large number of commuters interchanging from the Meitetsu railway lines at Toyotashi Station (adjacent to Shin-Toyota Station) travelling to the various Toyota manufacturing plants and commercial offices in the vicinity of Mikawa-Toyota Station.

=== Spain ===
- The R line, part of the Madrid subway, is a shuttle line connecting Ópera station (lines 2 and 5) with Príncipe Pío station (lines 6 and 10), which is also connected to Renfe commuter rail lines.

=== Switzerland ===
- The Zermatt shuttle connects the mountaineering and ski resort of Zermatt (Note: This resort has no road access.) with nearby Täsch, where people travelling to and from Zermatt by motor vehicles are required to park their cars. The service takes 12 minutes.

=== United Kingdom ===
- Butetown Branch Line: Transport for Wales operates regular services between Cardiff Queen Street and Cardiff Bay, in Wales
- Slough to Windsor & Eton Line: Great Western Railway runs between Slough and Windsor & Eton Central, in Berkshire, England
- Stourbridge Town branch line: West Midlands Railway runs a three-minute service between Stourbridge Junction and Stourbridge Town, in the West Midlands, England
- Colchester: Regular shuttle trains run between Colchester North on the Great Eastern Main Line and the more centrally-located Colchester Town; these are operated by Greater Anglia, in Essex, England
- Waterloo and City Line: London Underground operates a regular short service between Waterloo and Bank, in the City of London, England.

=== United States ===
- New York: the 42nd Street Shuttle operates on the New York City Subway between Times Square and Grand Central
- Chicago: the Yellow Line on the Chicago "L" originally ran as a non-stop shuttle between Dempster Street, in Skokie, and Howard Street, offering connections to the Red and Purple Lines. However, in 2012, an infill station was opened at Oakton Street. (Note: With three stations now on this route, this is no longer defined a shuttle service.)
- Princeton: the Princeton Branch, known as the "Dinky", is operated by NJ Transit as a non-stop shuttle connecting Princeton University to the Princeton Junction station, which is served by NJ Transit's Northeast Corridor Line and select trips on Amtrak's Northeast Regional.

== Car shuttle trains ==
A car shuttle train is used to transport accompanied automobiles and also other types of road vehicles, for a relatively short distance. They usually operate on lines passing through a rail tunnel and connecting two places not easily accessible to each other by road. On these services, passengers tend to stay with their vehicles throughout the journey.

== Freight shuttle trains ==
Unit trains that are dedicated to move on a regular basis between origin and destination are known as shuttle trains by the Union Pacific Railroad and the BNSF Railway

== See also ==
- Express train
- High-speed rail
- Luxury train
- Shuttle bus
