= Sasabara Station =

Railway station in Toyota, Aichi Prefecture, Japan

Sasabara Station 篠原駅
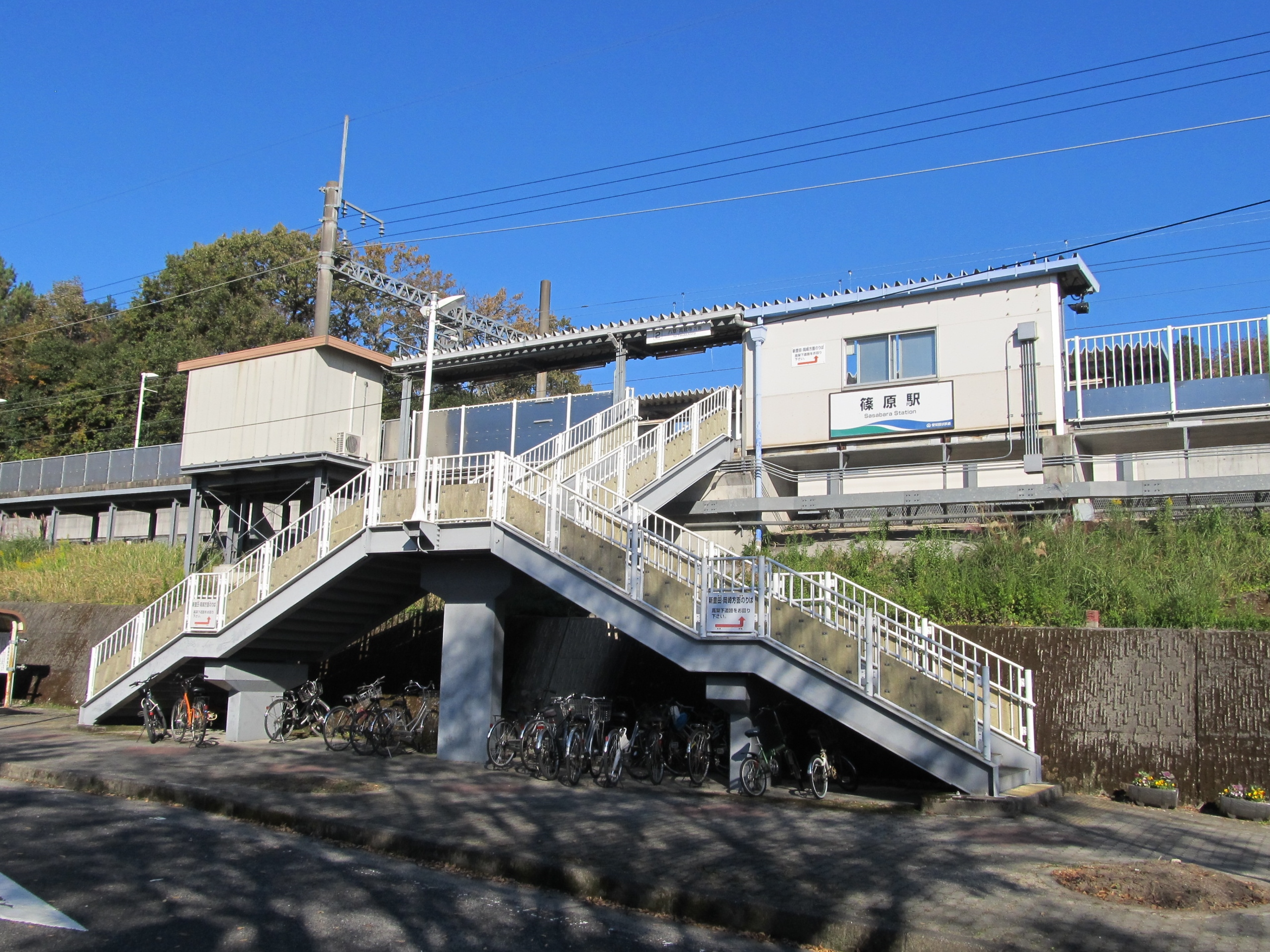
- Sasabara Station in November 2018

General information
- Location: Sunagairi Sasabaracho, Toyota-shi, Aichi-ken 470-0352; Japan
- Coordinates: 35.1547°N 137.121°E
- Operator: Aichi Loop Railway
- Line: ■ Aichi Loop Line
- Distance: 29.2 kilometers from Okazaki
- Platforms: 2 side platforms

Other information
- Status: Unstaffed
- Station code: 17
- Website: Official website

History
- Opened: January 31, 1988

Passengers
- FY2017: 281 daily
Location
- Location within Aichi Prefecture Location within Japan

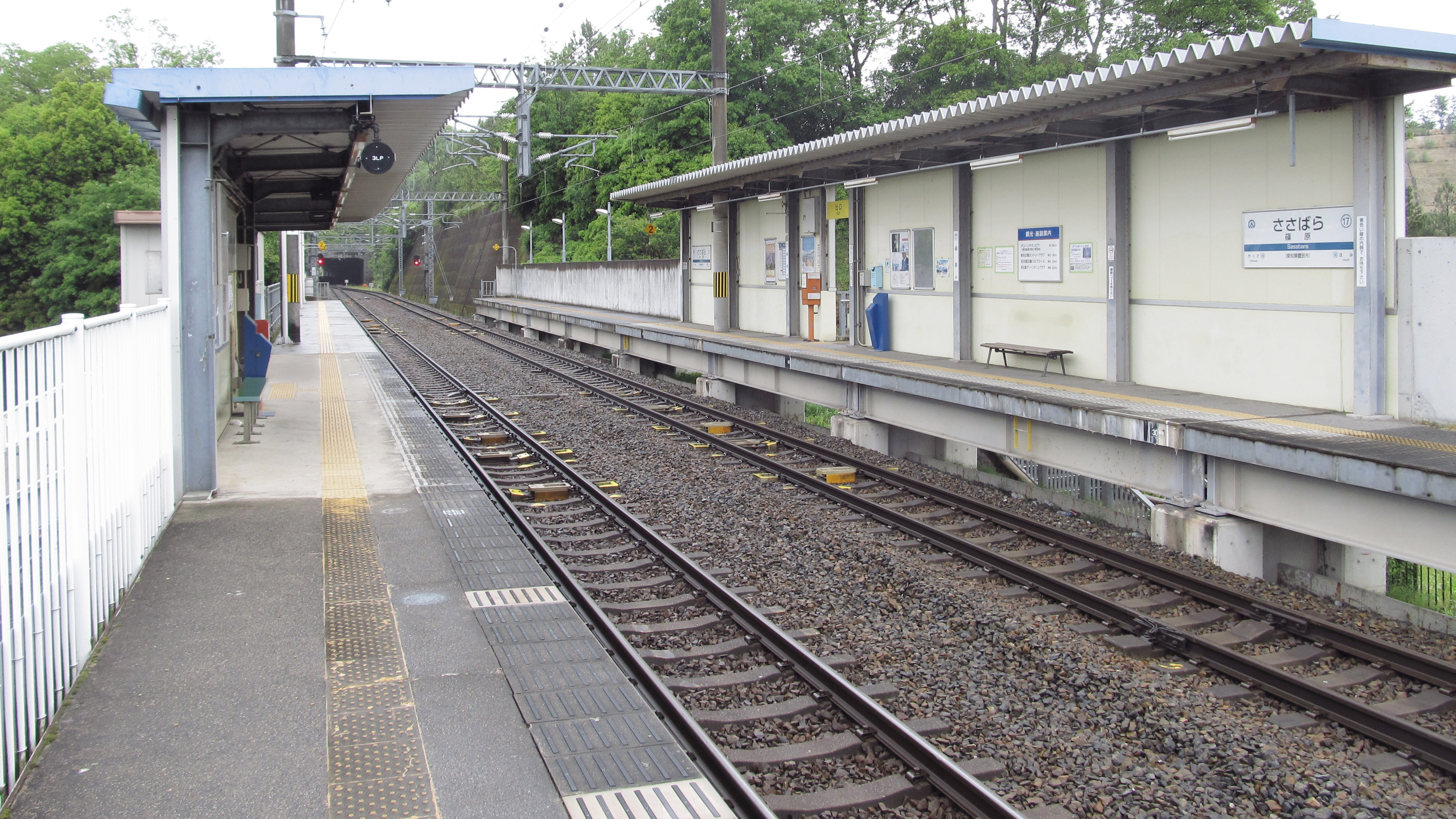
Platforms in May 2015

Sasabara Station (篠原駅, Sasabara-eki) is a railway station in the city of Toyota, Aichi Prefecture, Japan, operated by the third sector Aichi Loop Railway Company.

== Lines ==
Sasabara Station is served by the Aichi Loop Line, and is located 29.2 kilometers from the starting point of the line at Okazaki.

== Station layout ==
The station has two opposed side platforms on an embankment, with the station building located underneath. The station building has automated ticket machines and TOICA automated turnstiles and is unattended.

=== Platforms ===
1	■ Aichi Loop Line	For Okazaki
2	■ Aichi Loop Line	For Kōzōji

== Adjacent stations ==
«	Service	»
Aichi Loop Line
Homi	-	Yakusa

== Station history ==
Sasabara Station was opened on January 1, 1988 with the opening of the Aichi Loop Railway Company.

== Passenger statistics ==
In fiscal 2017, the station was used by an average of 281 passengers daily.

== Surrounding area ==
- Sasabara Industrial Park

== See also ==
- List of railway stations in Japan
