= Shigō Station =

Railway station in Toyota, Aichi Prefecture, Japan

Shigō Station 四郷駅
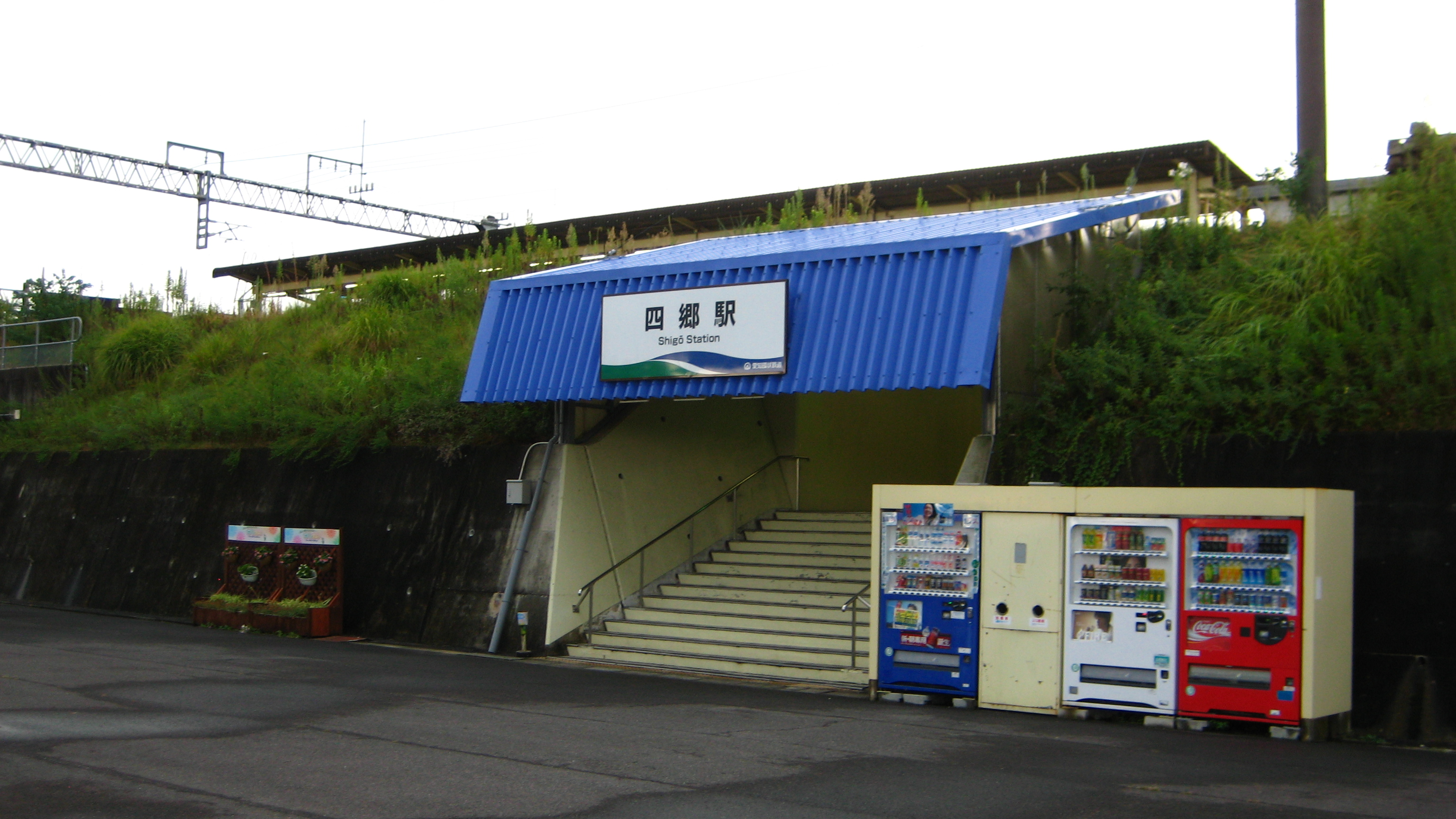
- Shigō Station in August 2008

General information
- Location: Morimae Shigō-chō, Toyota, Aichi 470-0373; Japan
- Coordinates: 35.1220°N 137.1625°E
- Operator: Aichi Loop Railway
- Line: ■ Aichi Loop Line
- Distance: 23.5 kilometers from Okazaki
- Platforms: 1 island platform

Other information
- Status: Staffed
- Station code: 14
- Website: Official website

History
- Opened: January 31, 1988

Passengers
- FY2017: 1390 daily
Location
- Location within Aichi Prefecture Location within Japan

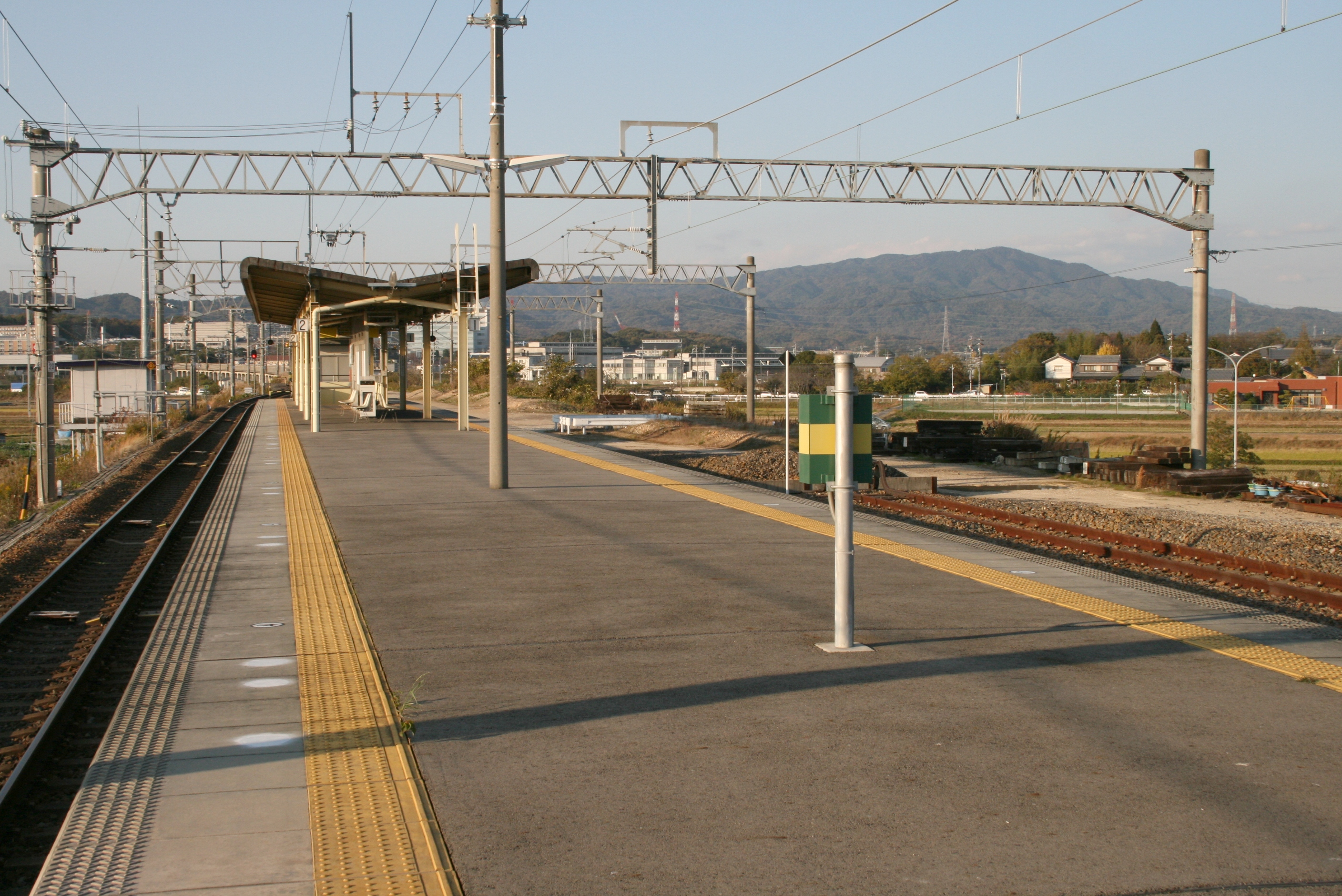
Platform in November 2009

Shigō Station (四郷駅, Shigō-eki) is a railway station in the city of Toyota, Aichi Prefecture, Japan, operated by the third sector Aichi Loop Railway Company.

== Lines ==
Shigō Station is served by the Aichi Loop Line and is located 23.5 kilometers from the starting point of the line at Okazaki.

== Station layout ==
The station has a single island platform on an embankment, with the station building located underneath. The station building has automated ticket machines, TOICA automated turnstiles and is staffed.

=== Platforms ===
1	■ Aichi Loop Line	For Okazaki
2	■ Aichi Loop Line	For Kōzōji

== Adjacent stations ==
«	Service	»
Aichi Loop Line
Aikan-Umetsubo	-	Kaizu

== Station history ==
Shigō Station was opened on January 31, 1988, with the opening of the Aichi Loop Railway Company.

== Passenger statistics ==
In fiscal 2017, the station was used by an average of 1390 passengers daily.

== Surrounding area ==
- Toyota North Fire Department
- Tsusazage Agricultural High School

== See also ==
- List of railway stations in Japan
