= Suenohara Station =

Railway station in Toyota, Aichi Prefecture, Japan

Suenohara Station 末野原駅
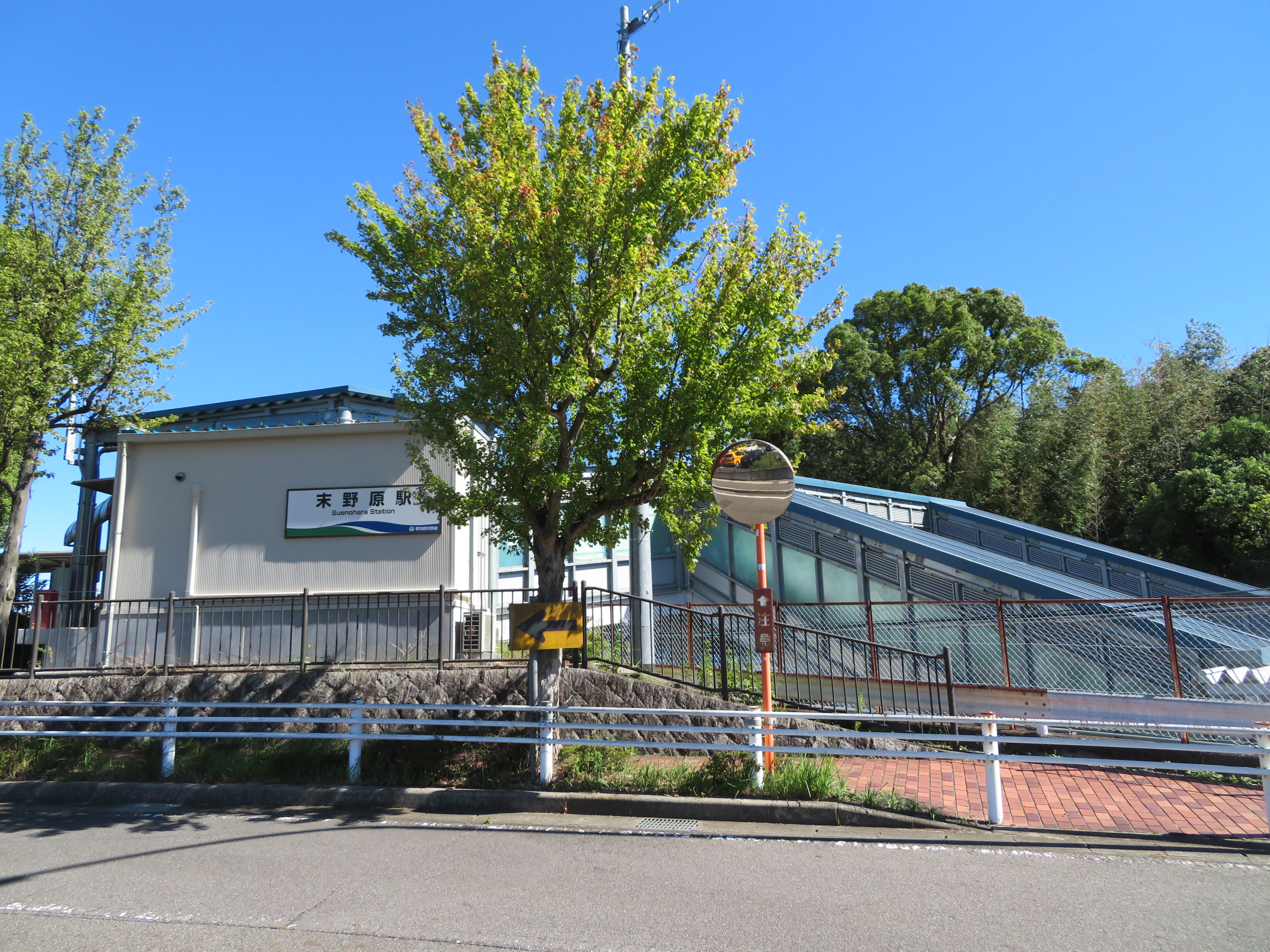
- Suenohara Station, October 2019

General information
- Location: 12-2-3 Toyosaku-cho, Toyota-shi, Aichi-ken 470-1201; Japan
- Coordinates: 35.0395°N 137.1470°E
- Operator: Aichi Loop Railway
- Line: ■ Aichi Loop Line
- Distance: 14.0 kilometers from Okazaki
- Platforms: 2 side platforms

Other information
- Status: Staffed
- Station code: 09
- Website: Official website

Passengers
- FY2017: 2379 daily
Location
- Location within Aichi Prefecture Location within Japan

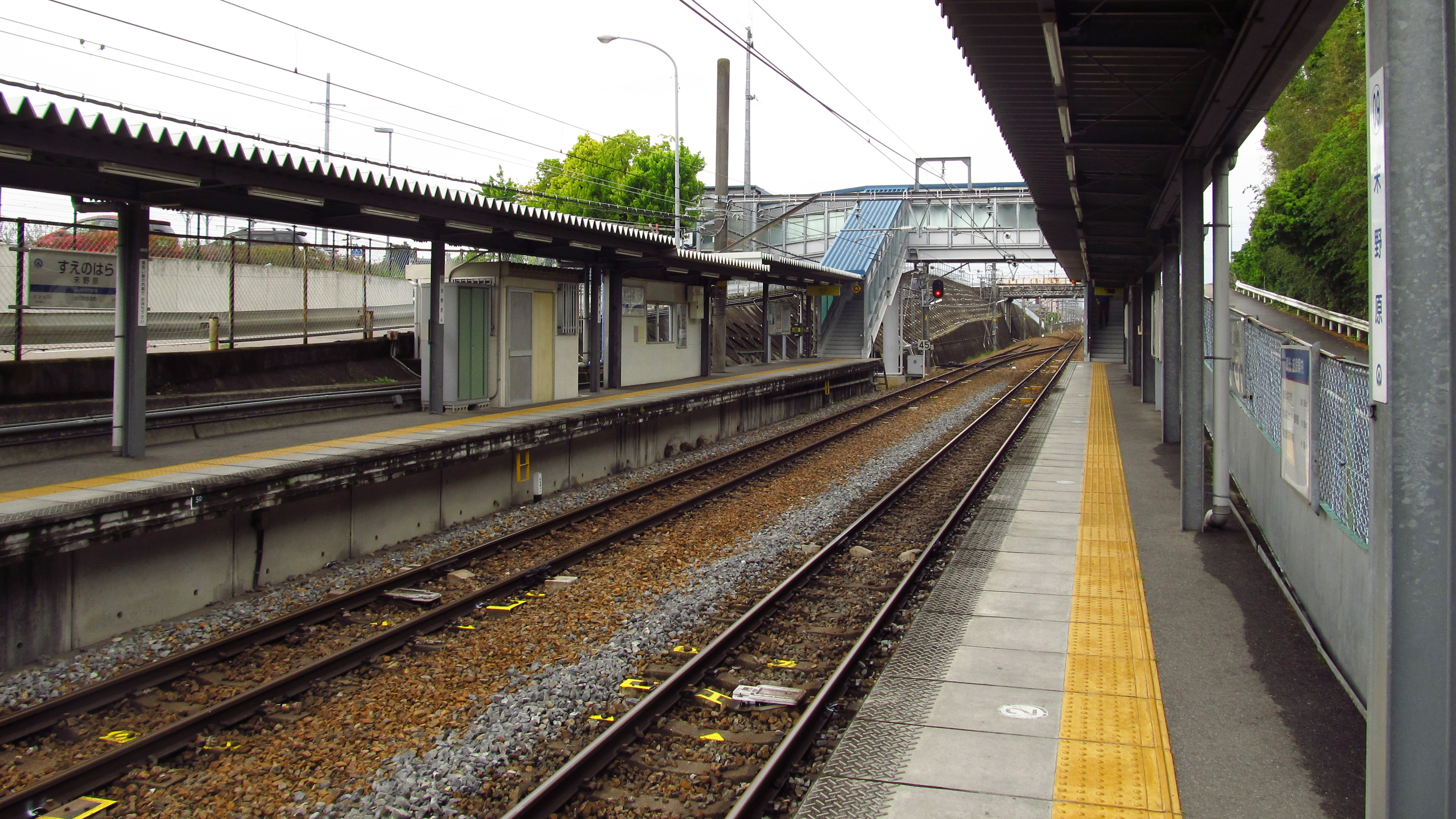
Platforms in May 2015

Suenohara Station (末野原駅, Suenohara-eki) is a railway station in the city of Toyota, Aichi Prefecture, Japan, operated by the third sector Aichi Loop Railway Company.

== Lines ==
Suenohara Station is served by the Aichi Loop Line, and is located 14.0 kilometers from the starting point of the line at Okazaki.

== Station layout ==
The station has two opposed side platforms, connected by a footbridge. The station building has automated ticket machines, TOICA automated turnstiles and is staffed.

=== Platforms ===
1	■ Aichi Loop Line	For Okazaki
2	■ Aichi Loop Line	For Mikawa-Toyota and Kōzōji

== Adjacent stations ==
«	Service	»
Aichi Loop Line
Ekaku	-	Mikawa-Toyota

== Station history ==
Suenohara Station was opened on January 31, 1988 together with the opening of the Aichi Loop Railway Line.

== Passenger statistics ==
In fiscal 2017, the station was used by an average of 2379 passengers daily.

== Surrounding area ==
- Toyono High School
- Sunohara Junior High School

== See also ==
- List of railway stations in Japan
