= Shin-Uwagoromo Station =

Railway station in Toyota, Aichi Prefecture, Japan

Shin-Uwagoromo Station 新上挙母駅
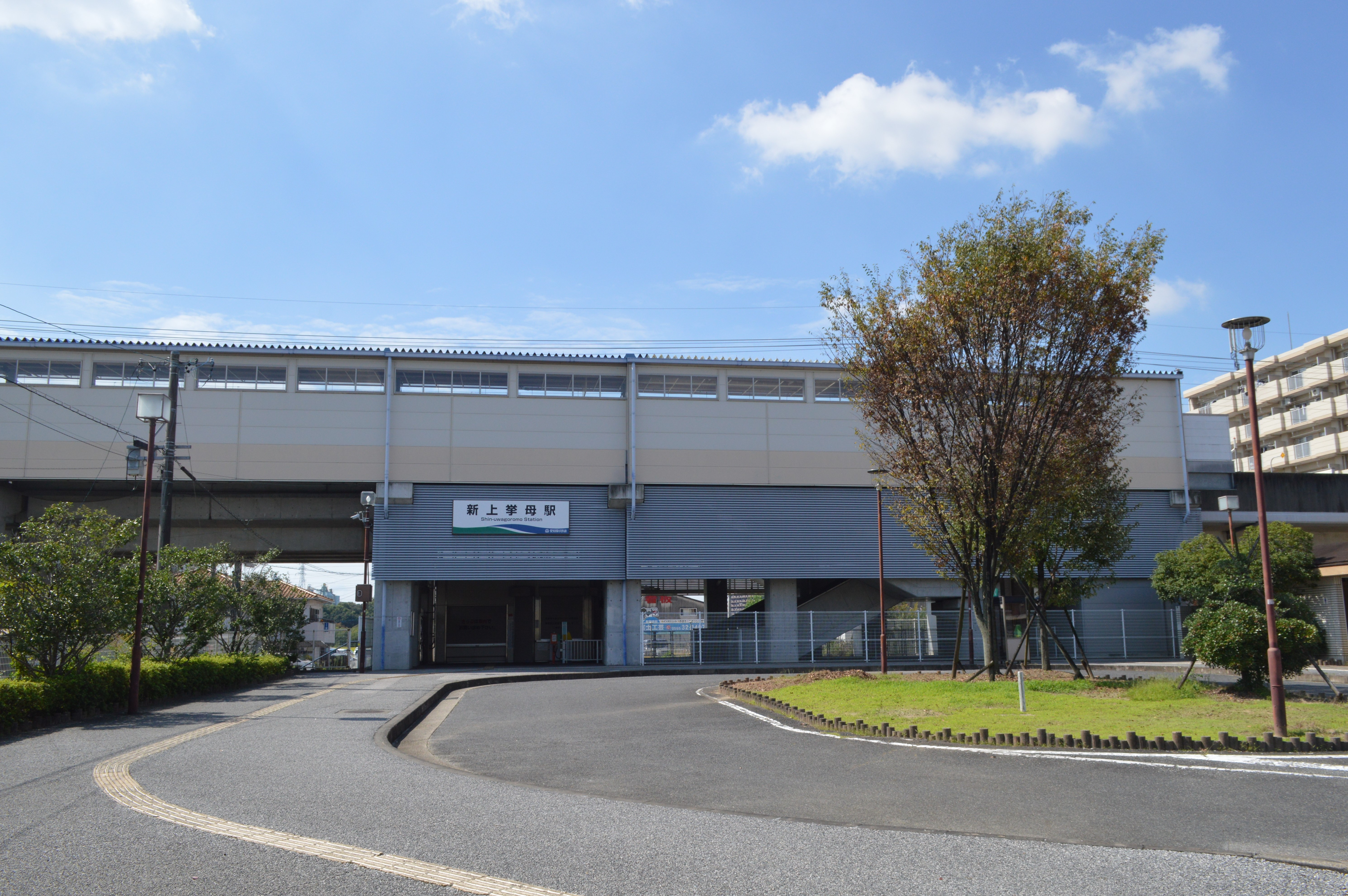
- Shin-Uwagoromo Station in 2021

General information
- Location: 1-6-2 Tsukasa-cho, Toyota-shi, Aichi-ken 471-0831; Japan
- Coordinates: 35.0713°N 137.1518°E
- Operator: Aichi Loop Railway
- Line: ■ Aichi Loop Line
- Distance: 17.6 kilometers from Okazaki
- Platforms: 2 side platforms

Other information
- Status: Staffed
- Station code: 11
- Website: Official website

History
- Opened: January 31, 1988

Passengers
- FY2017: 1583 daily
Location
- Location within Aichi Prefecture Location within Japan

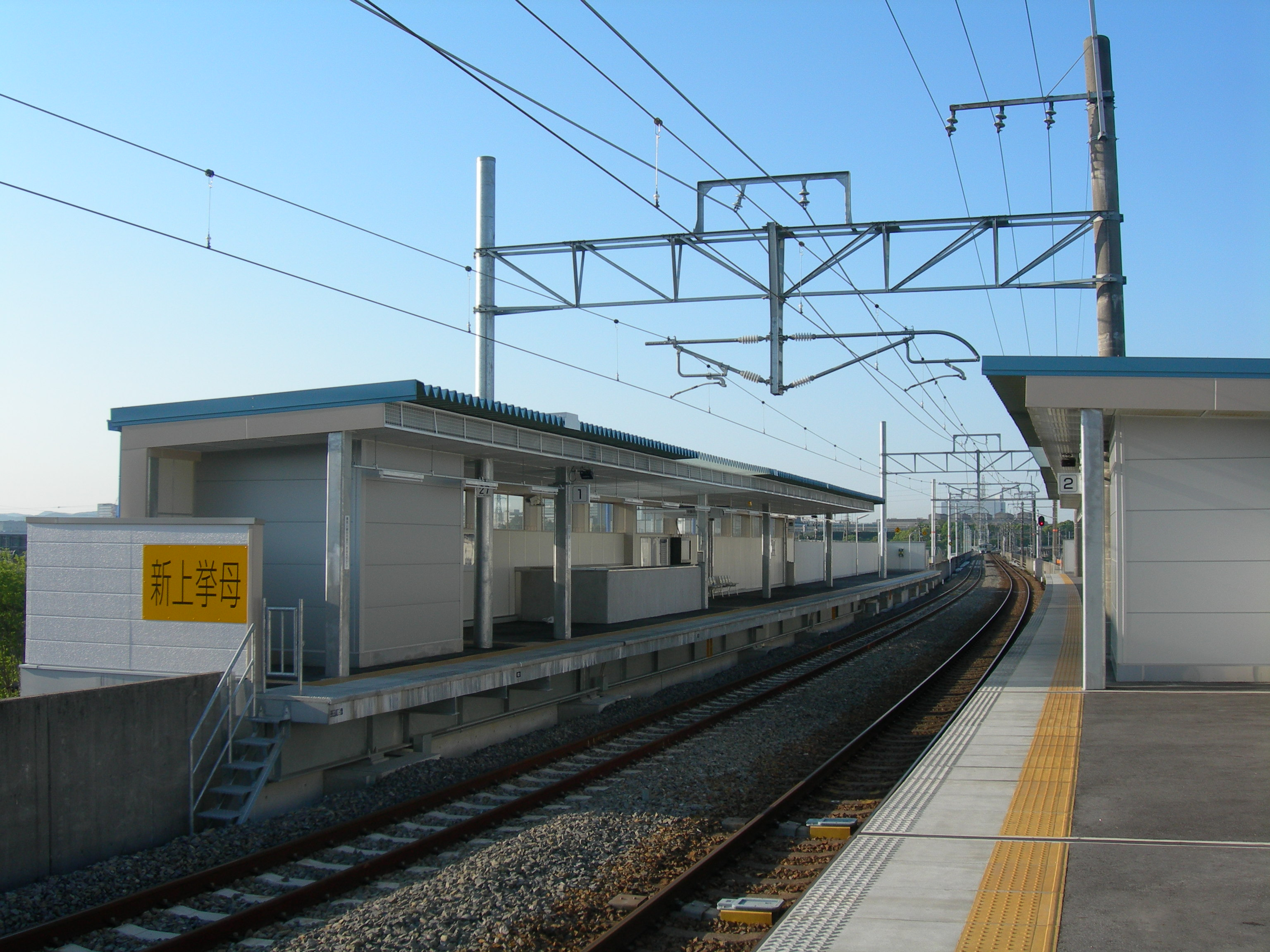
Platforms in May 2008

Shin-Uwagoromo Station (新上挙母駅, Shin-Uwagoromo-eki) is a railway station in the city of Toyota, Aichi Prefecture, Japan, operated by the third sector Aichi Loop Railway Company.

== Lines ==
Shin-Uwagoromo Station is served by the Aichi Loop Line, and is located 17.6 kilometers from the starting point of the line at Okazaki.

== Station layout ==
The station has two elevated side platforms, with the station building located underneath. The station building has automated ticket machines, TOICA automated turnstiles and is staffed.

=== Platforms ===
1	■ Aichi Loop Line	For Okazaki
2	■ Aichi Loop Line	For Kōzōji

== Adjacent stations ==
«	Service	»
Aichi Loop Line
Mikawa-Toyota	-	Shin-Toyota

== Station history ==
Shin-Uwagoromo Station was opened on January 31, 1988, with the opening of the Aichi Loop Railway Company. The platforms were elevated from 2007 to 2008.

== Passenger statistics ==
In fiscal 2017, the station was used by an average of 1583 passengers daily.

== Surrounding area ==
- Sumitomo Rubber Nagoya Plant
- Asahigaoka Junior High School

== See also ==
- List of railway stations in Japan
