= Mutsuna Station =

Railway station in Okazaki, Aichi Prefecture, Japan

Mutsuna Station 六名駅
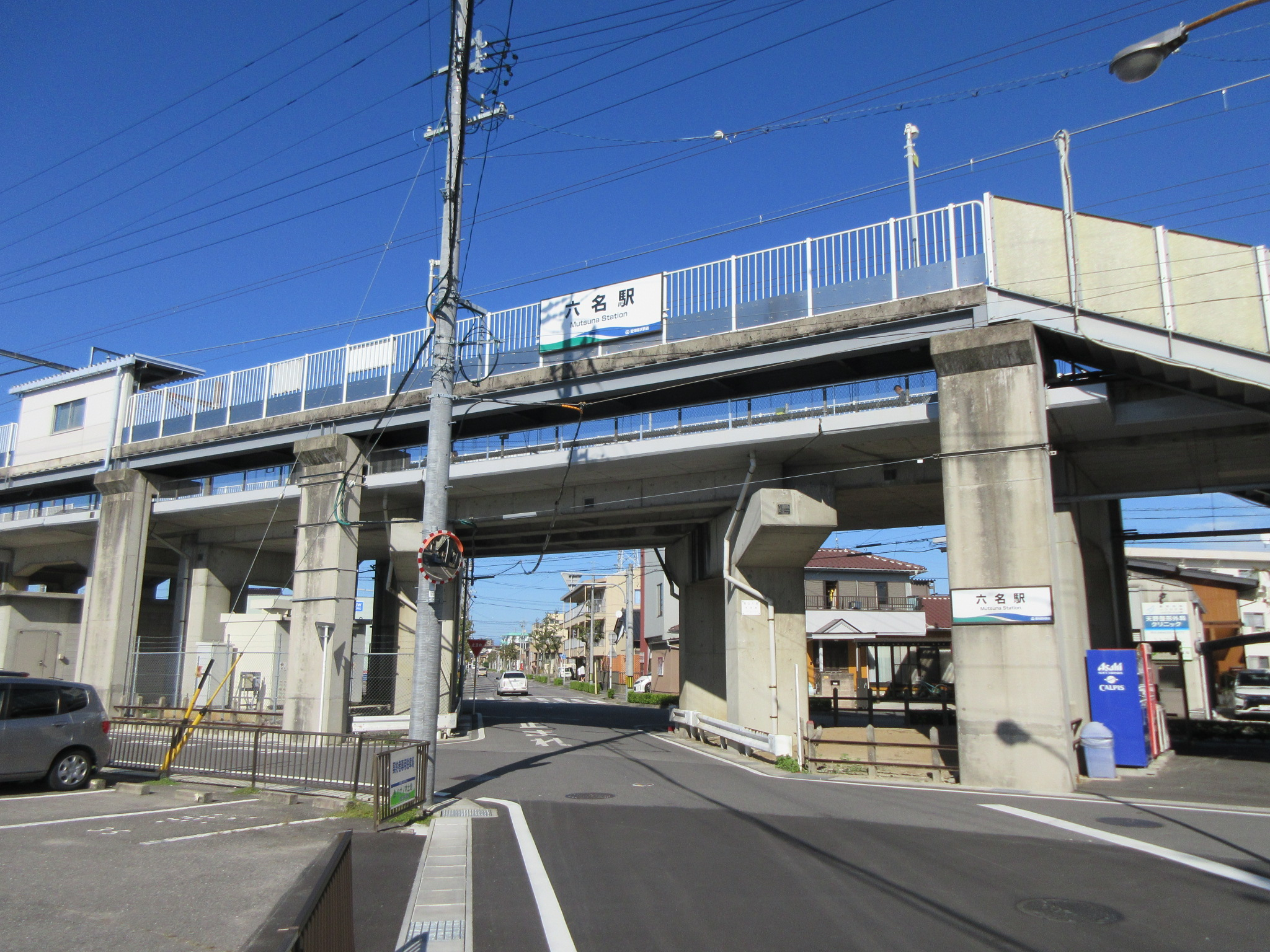
- Mutsuna Station, September 2017

General information
- Location: 11 Mutsunashinmachi, Okazaki-shi, Aichi-ken 444-0846; Japan
- Coordinates: 34.9411°N 137.1520°E
- Operator: Aichi Loop Railway
- Line: ■ Aichi Loop Line
- Distance: 1.7 kilometers from Okazaki
- Platforms: 2 side platforms

Other information
- Status: Unstaffed
- Station code: 02
- Website: Official website

History
- Opened: January 31, 1988

Passengers
- FY2017: 696 daily
Location
- Location within Aichi Prefecture Location within Japan

Track layout

Mutsuna Station (六名駅, Mutsuna-eki) is a railway station in the city of Okazaki, Aichi Prefecture, Japan, operated by the third sector Aichi Loop Railway Company.

== Lines ==
Mutsuna Station is served by the Aichi Loop Line, and is located 1.7 kilometers from the starting point of the line at Okazaki.

== Station layout ==
The station has two opposed elevated side platforms, with the station building located underneath. The station building has automated ticket machines, TOICA automated turnstiles and is unattended.

=== Platforms ===
1	■ Aichi Loop Line	for Mikawa-Toyota and Okazaki
2	■ Aichi Loop Line	for Kōzōji

== Adjacent stations ==
«	Service	»
Aichi Loop Line
Okazaki	-	Naka-Okazaki

== Station history ==
Mutsuna Station was opened on January 31, 1988 together with the establishment of the Aichi Loop Railway Company.

== Passenger statistics ==
In fiscal 2017, the station was used by an average of 696 passengers daily.

== Surrounding area ==
- Mutsuna Elementary School

== See also ==
- List of railway stations in Japan
