= Kaizu Station =

Railway station in Toyota, Aichi Prefecture, Japan

Kaizu Station 貝津駅
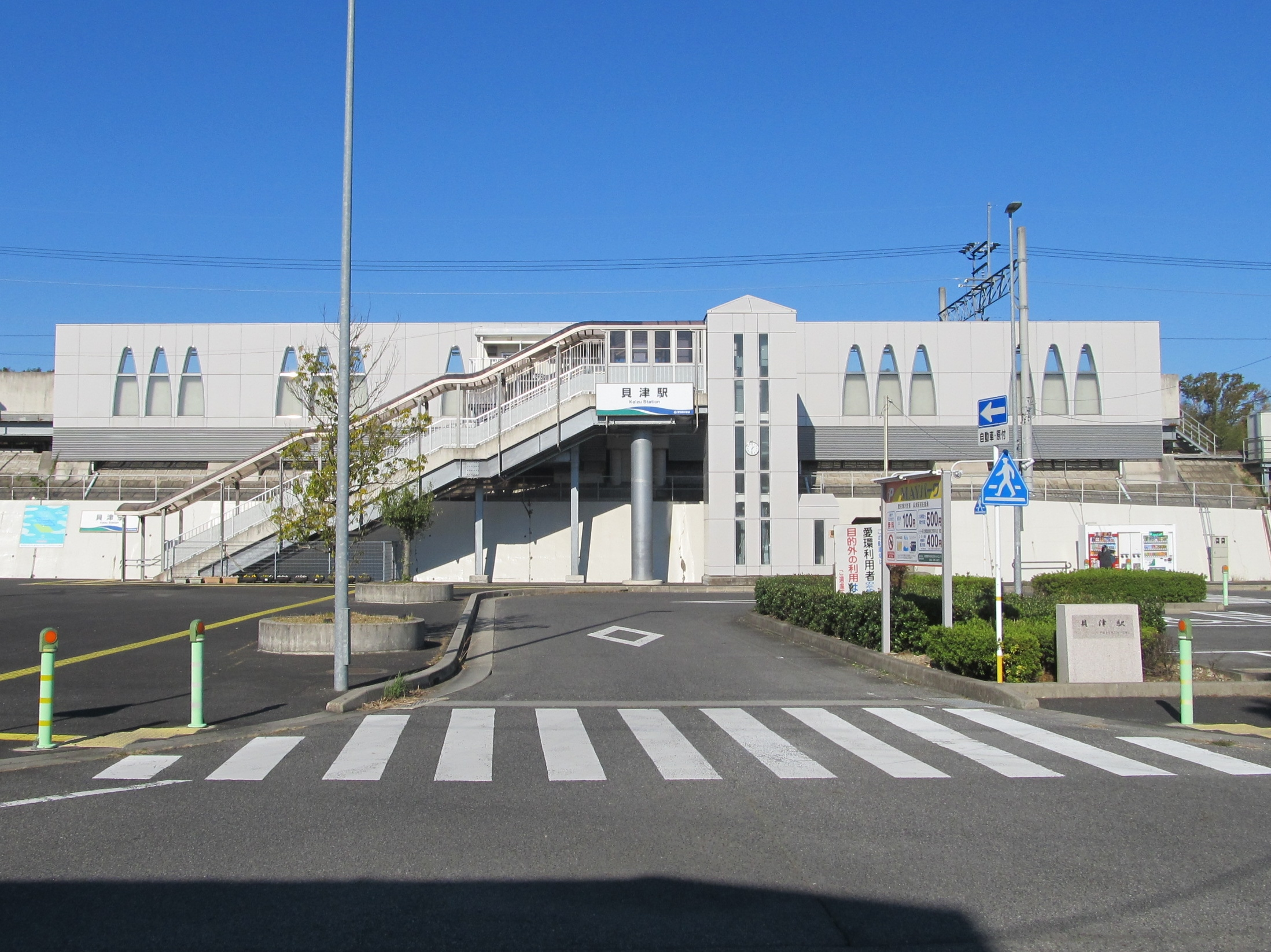
- Kaizu Station, November 2018

General information
- Location: Kaizu-cho, Katasaka, Toyota-shi, Aichi-ken 470-0348; Japan
- Coordinates: 35.1329°N 137.1479°E
- Operator: Aichi Loop Railway
- Line: ■ Aichi Loop Line
- Distance: 25.5 kilometers from Okazaki
- Platforms: 1 side platform

Other information
- Status: Staffed
- Station code: 15
- Website: Official website

History
- Opened: March 1, 1985

Passengers
- FY2017: 1062 daily
Location
- Location within Aichi Prefecture Location within Japan

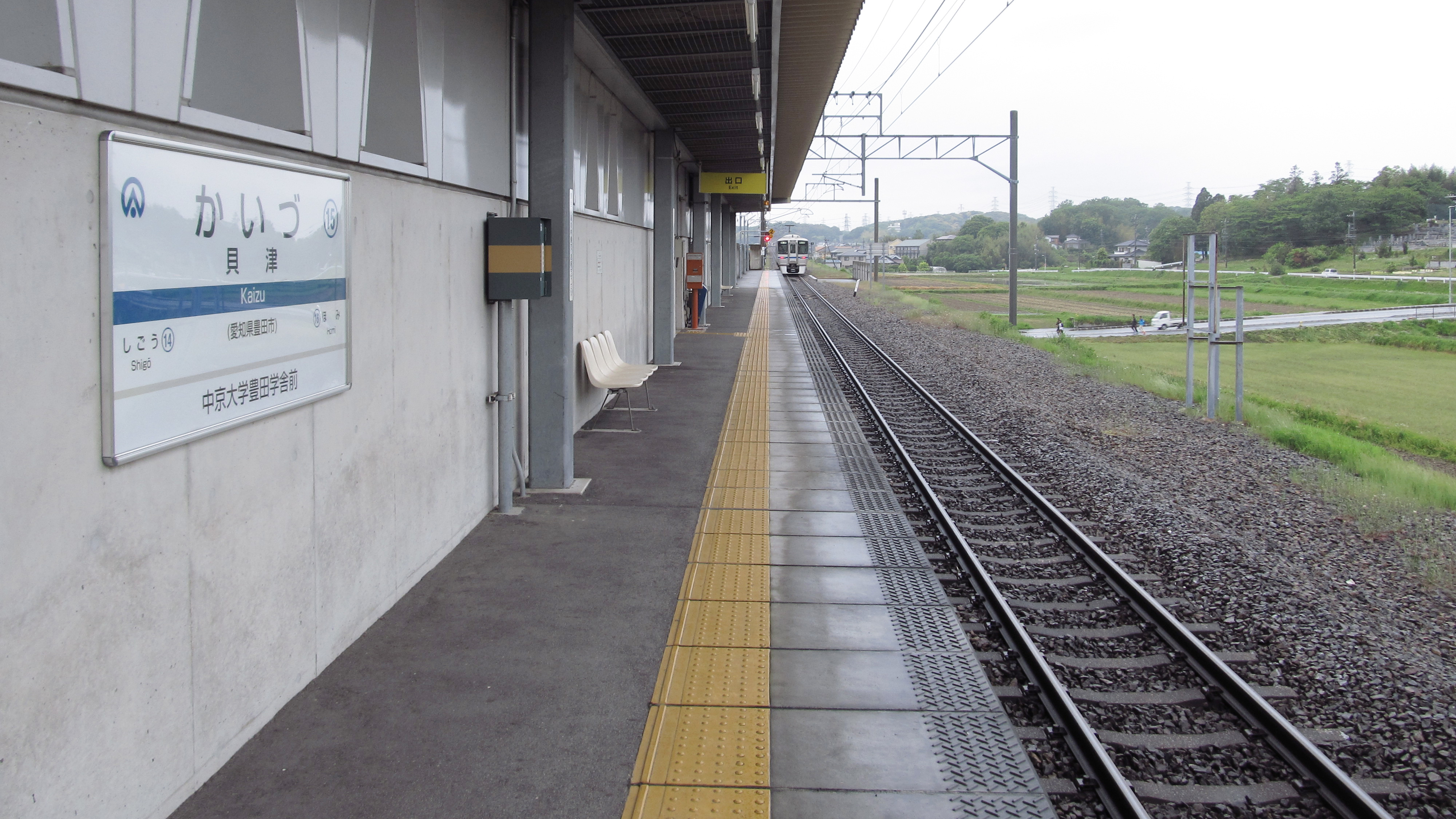
Platform in May 2015

Kaizu Station (貝津駅, Kaizu-eki) is a railway station in the city of Toyota, Aichi Prefecture, Japan, operated by the third sector Aichi Loop Railway Company.

== Lines ==
Kaizu Station is served by the Aichi Loop Line, and is located 25.5 kilometers from the starting point of the line at Okazaki.

== Station layout ==
The station has one side platform built on an embankment. The station building has automated ticket machines, TOICA automated turnstiles and is staffed.

== Adjacent stations ==
«	Service	»
Aichi Loop Line
Shigō	-	Homi

== Station history ==
Kaizu Station was opened on March 1, 1985.

== Passenger statistics ==
In fiscal 2017, the station was used by an average of 1062 passengers daily.

== Surrounding area ==
- Chukyo University Toyota campus

== See also ==
- List of railway stations in Japan
