= Daimon Station (Aichi) =

Railway station in Okazaki, Aichi Prefecture, Japan

Daimon Station 大門駅
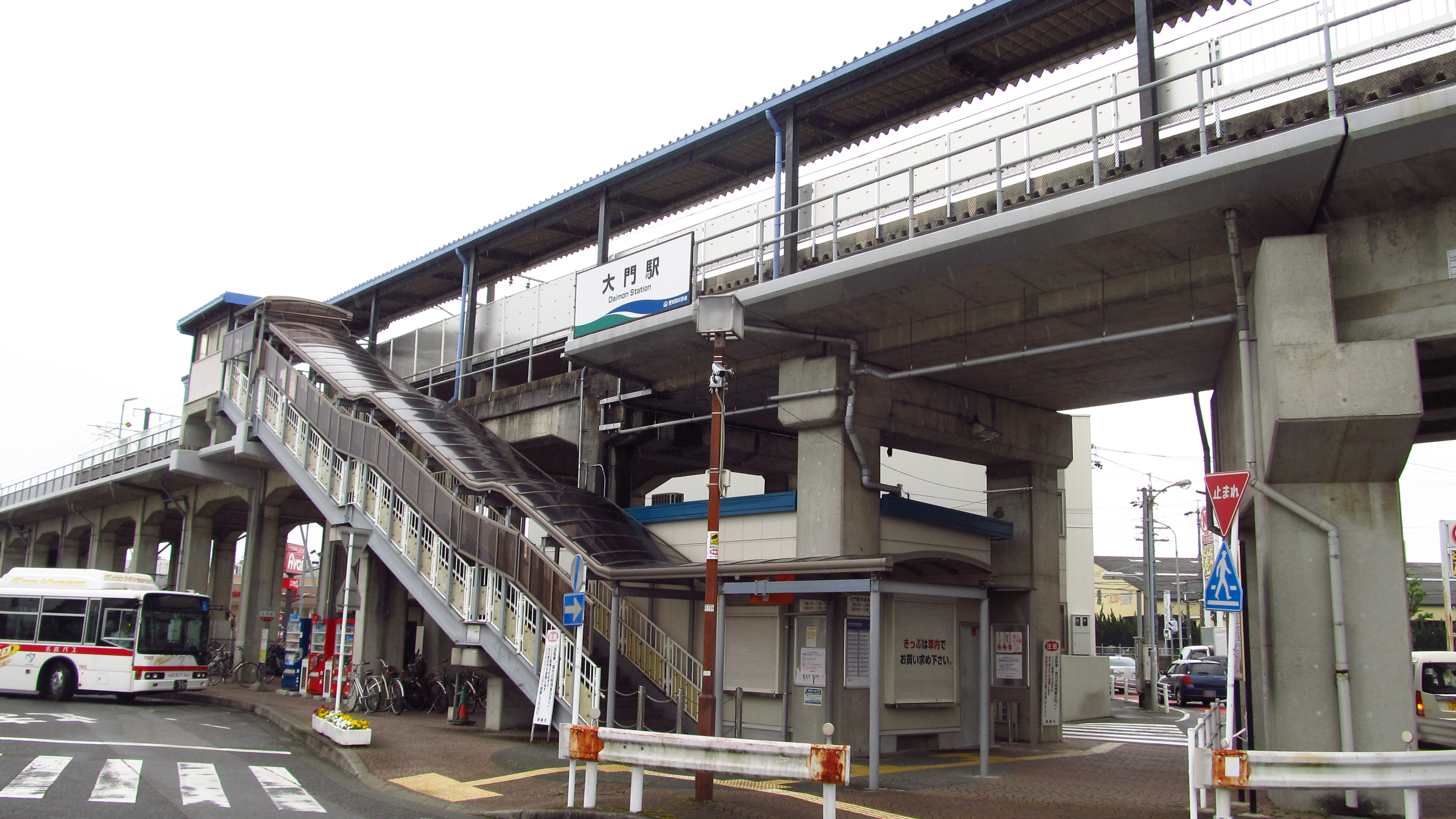
- Daimon Station in May 2015

General information
- Location: 2-19-5 Daijuji, Okazaki-shi, Aichi-ken 444-2134; Japan
- Coordinates: 34.9822°N 137.155°E
- Operator: Aichi Loop Railway
- Line: ■ Aichi Loop Line
- Distance: 6.5 kilometers from Okazaki
- Platforms: 1 side platform

Other information
- Status: Staffed (during business hours)
- Station code: 05
- Website: Official website

History
- Opened: January 31, 1988

Passengers
- FY2017: 1339 daily
Location
- Location within Aichi Prefecture Location within Japan

Daimon Station (大門駅, Daimon-eki) is a railway station in the city of Okazaki, Aichi Prefecture, Japan, operated by the third sector Aichi Loop Railway Company.

== Lines ==
Daimon Station is served by the Aichi Loop Line, and is located 6.5 kilometers from the starting point of the line at Okazaki.

== Station layout ==
The station has one elevated side platform serving a single bi-directional track, with the station building located underneath. The station building has automated ticket machines, TOICA automated turnstiles and is staffed. There is a bus stop nearby, served by Meitetsu with direct service to Higashi-Okazaki station.

== Adjacent stations ==
«	Service	»
Aichi Loop Line
Kita-Okazaki	-	Kitano-Masuzuka

== Station history ==
Daimon Station was opened on January 31, 1988, together with the establishment of the Aichi Loop Railway Company.

== Passenger statistics ==
In fiscal 2017, the station was used by an average of 1339 passengers daily.

== Surrounding area ==
- Daimon Elementary School
- Daiju-ji

== See also ==
- List of railway stations in Japan
