= Aikan-Umetsubo Station =

Railway station in Toyota, Aichi Prefecture, Japan

Aikan-Umetsubo Station 愛環梅坪駅
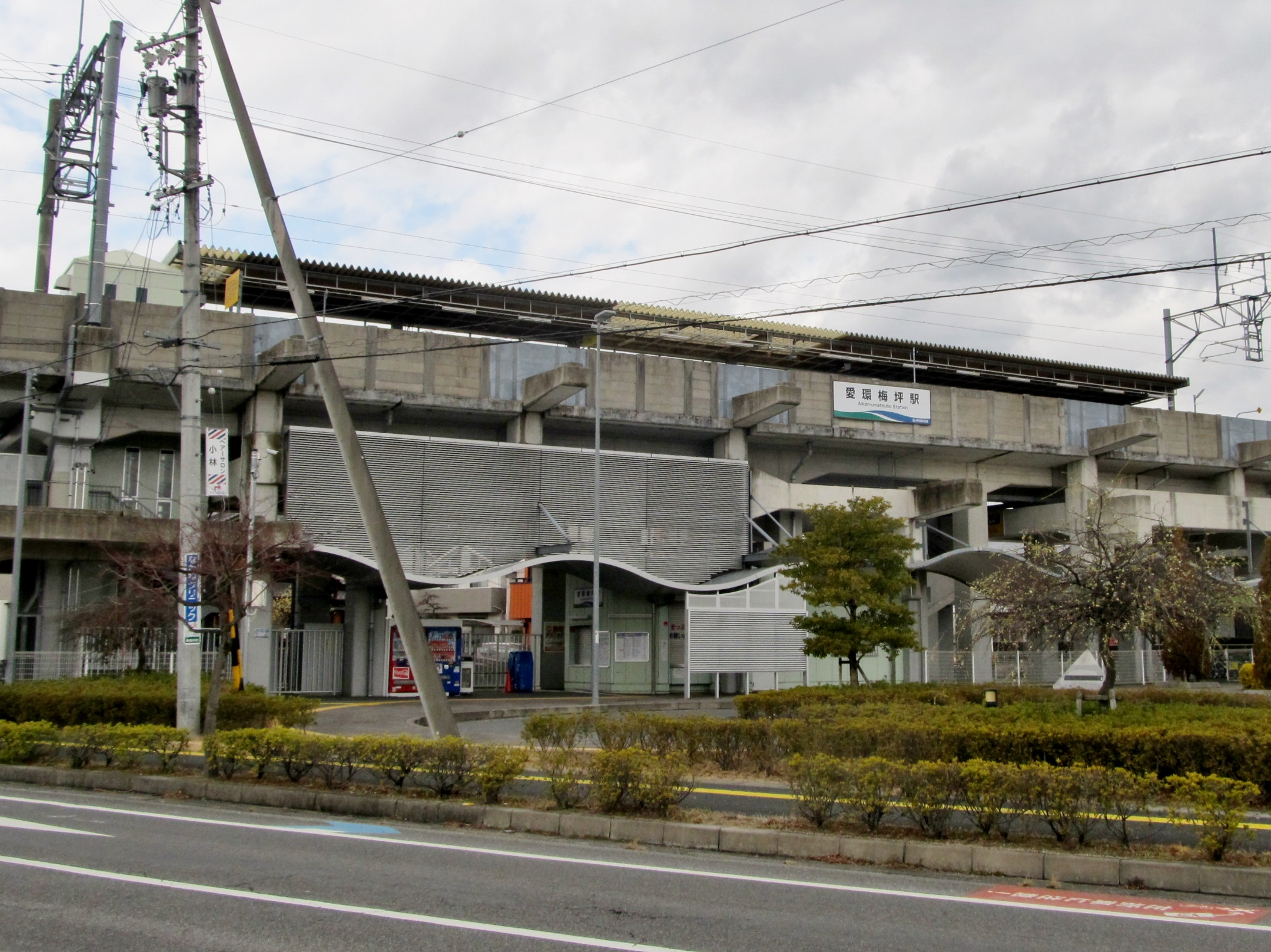
- Aikan-Umetsubo Station, February 2019

General information
- Location: 1-6 Higashiumetsubocho, Toyota-shi, Aichi-ken 471-0071; Japan
- Coordinates: 35.1051°N 137.1605°E
- Operator: Aichi Loop Railway
- Line: ■ Aichi Loop Line
- Distance: 21.5 kilometers from Okazaki
- Platforms: 1 side platform

Other information
- Status: Staffed
- Station code: 13
- Website: Official website

History
- Opened: March 1, 2005

Passengers
- FY2017: 1905 daily
Location
- Location within Aichi Prefecture Location within Japan

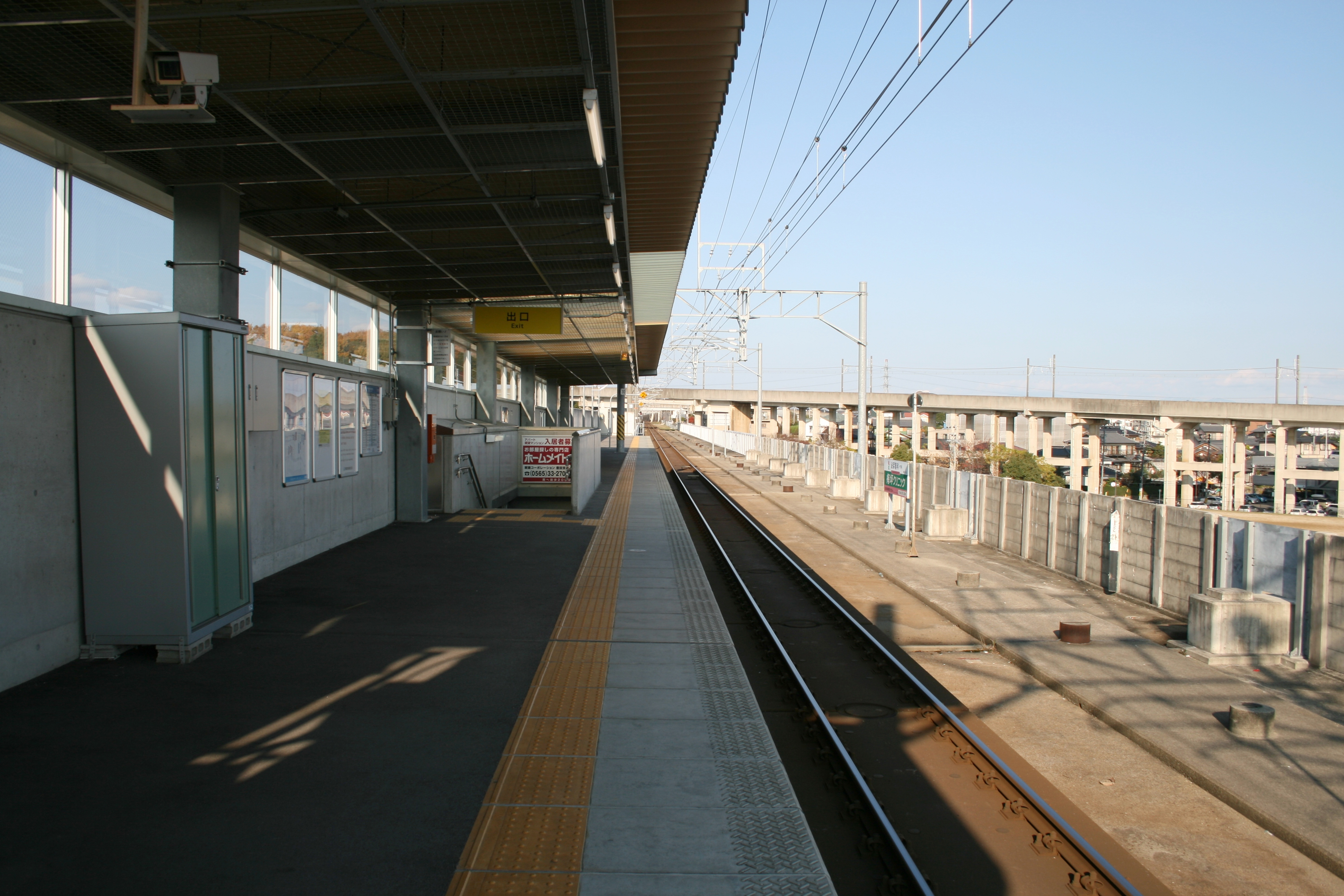
Platforms in November 2009

Aikan-Umetsubo Station (愛環梅坪駅, Aikan-Umetsubo-eki) is a railway station in the city of Toyota, Aichi Prefecture, Japan, operated by the third sector Aichi Loop Railway Company.

== Lines ==
Aikan-Umetsubo Station is served by the Aichi Loop Line, and is located 21.5 kilometers from the starting point of the line at Okazaki.

== Station layout ==
The station has a single elevated side platform with the station building located underneath. The station building has automated ticket machines, TOICA automated turnstiles and is staffed.

== Adjacent stations ==
| « | Service | » |
Aichi Loop Line
| Shin-Toyota | - | Shigō |

== Station history ==
Aikan-Umetsubo Station was opened on March 1, 2005.

== Passenger statistics ==
In fiscal 2017, the station was used by an average of 1905 passengers daily.

== Surrounding area ==
- Umetsubo Station
- Umetsubo Elementary School

== See also ==
- List of railway stations in Japan
