= Mikawa-Toyota Station =

Railway station in Toyota, Aichi Prefecture, Japan

Mikawa-Toyota Station 三河豊田駅
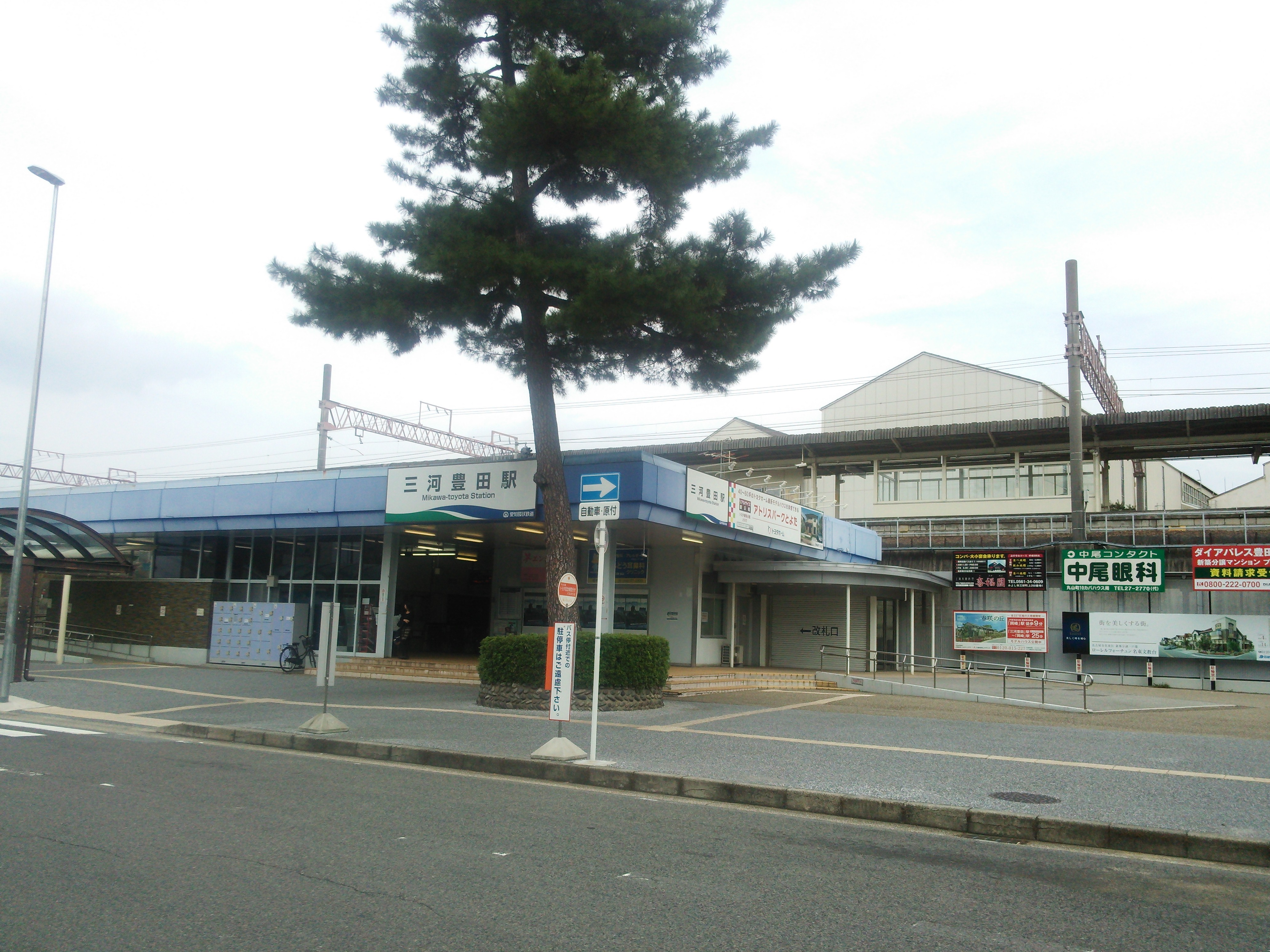
- Mikawa-Toyota Station in October 2014

General information
- Location: 643 Toyota-cho, Toyota-shi, Aichi-ken 471-0826; Japan
- Coordinates: 35.0551°N 137.1510°E
- Operator: Aichi Loop Railway
- Line: ■ Aichi Loop Line
- Distance: 15.9 kilometers from Okazaki
- Platforms: 2 side platforms

Other information
- Status: Staffed
- Station code: 10
- Website: Official website

History
- Opened: December 27, 1937

Passengers
- FY2017: 1 daily
Location
- Location within Aichi Prefecture Location within Japan

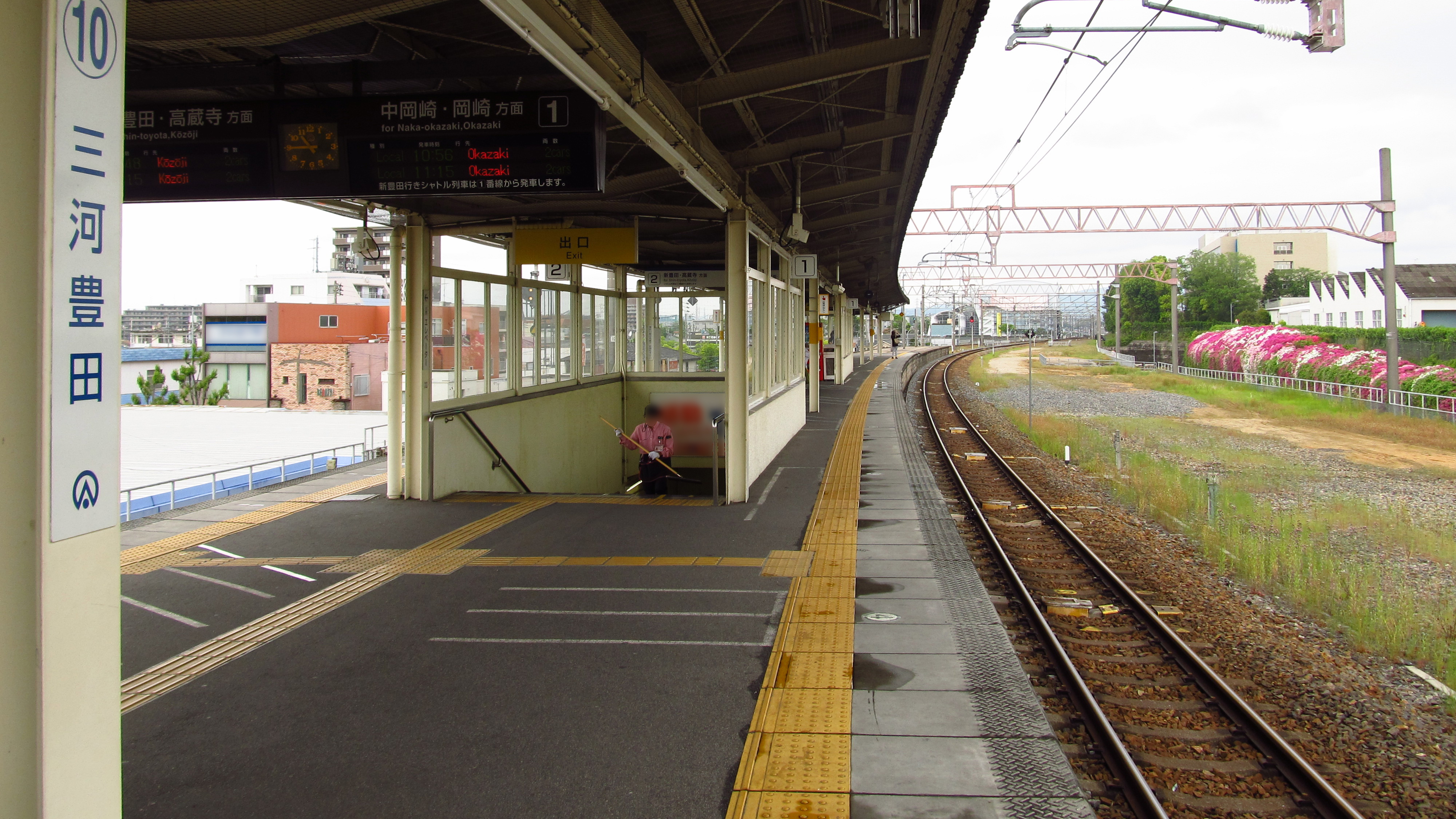
Platforms in May 2015

Mikawa-Toyota Station (三河豊田駅, Mikawa-Toyota-eki) is a railway station in the city of Toyota, Aichi Prefecture, Japan, operated by the third sector Aichi Loop Railway Company.

== Lines ==
Mikawa-Toyota Station is served by the Aichi Loop Line, and is located 15.9 kilometers from the starting point of the line at Okazaki.

== Station layout ==
The station has two has two opposed side platforms, connected by a footbridge. The station building has automated ticket machines, TOICA automated turnstiles and is staffed.

=== Platforms ===
| 1 | ■ Aichi Loop Line | For Okazaki |
| 2 | ■ Aichi Loop Line | For Kōzōji |

== Adjacent stations ==
| « | Service | » |
Aichi Loop Line
| Suenohara | - | Shin-Uwagoromo |

== Station history ==
Mikawa-Toyota Station was opened on December 27, 1937 as a station on the privately held Mikawa Railway Okazaki Line. The Mikawa Railway was merged with Meitetsu June 1, 1941, and the Okazaki Line became the Meitetsu Okazaki Line. The station name was renamed Toyota-Jidōsha-mae Station (トヨタ自動車前駅, Toyota-jidōsha-mae eki) on October 1, 1959. On August 30, 1973, the extension from this station to Koromo Station was discontinued. The station was transferred to the Japan National Railways (JNR) Okata Line connecting Okazaki with Shin-Toyota on April 26, 1976.

With the privatization of the JNR on April 1, 1987, the station came under control of the JR Central. The station was transferred to the third sector Aichi Loop Railway Company on January 31, 1988, and reverted to its original name.

== Passenger statistics ==
In fiscal 2017, the station was used by an average of 14,299 passengers daily.

== Surrounding area ==
- Toyota Motors Kaikan
- Yamanote Elementary School

== See also ==
- List of railway stations in Japan
