= Aichi Loop Railway 2000 series =

Japanese train type

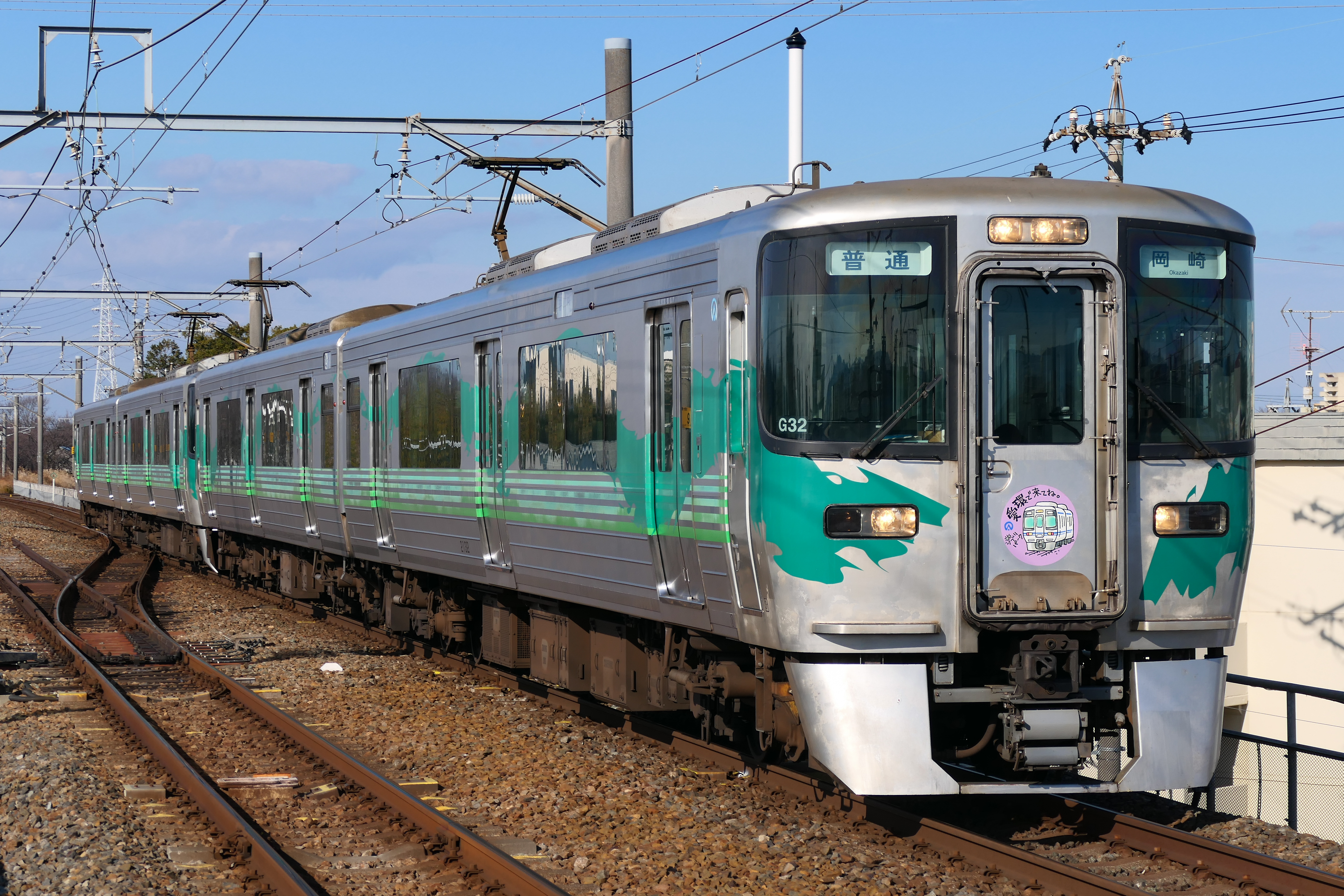
- Set G32 in original livery, December 2023
- In service: March 2003 – present
- Manufacturer: Nippon Sharyo
- Constructed: 2002–2009
- Entered service: 14 March 2003
- Number built: 40 vehicles (20 sets)
- Number in service: 40 vehicles (20 sets)
- Formation: 2 cars per trainset
- Fleet numbers: G1–G14, G31–G33, G51–G52
- Operators: Aichi Loop Railway
- Depots: Kitano-Masuzuka
- Lines served: Aichi Loop Line

Specifications
- Car body construction: Stainless steel
- Car length: 20,100 mm (65 ft 11 in)
- Width: 2,978 mm (9 ft 9 in)
- Height: 4,020 mm (13 ft 2 in)
- Doors: 3 pairs per side
- Maximum speed: 110 km/h (68 mph)
- Acceleration: 2.6 km/(h⋅s) (1.6 mph/s)
- Electric system(s): 1,500 V DC (overhead wire)
- Current collection: Pantograph
- Bogies: ND731 (motored); ND731T (trailer)
- Track gauge: 1,067 mm (3 ft 6 in)

The Aichi Loop Railway 2000 series (愛知環状鉄道2000系) is a 2-car electric multiple unit (EMU) train type operated by the Japanese third sector railway operator Aichi Loop Railway on the Aichi Loop Line since March 2003.

It is based on the JR Central 313 series.

== Formations ==
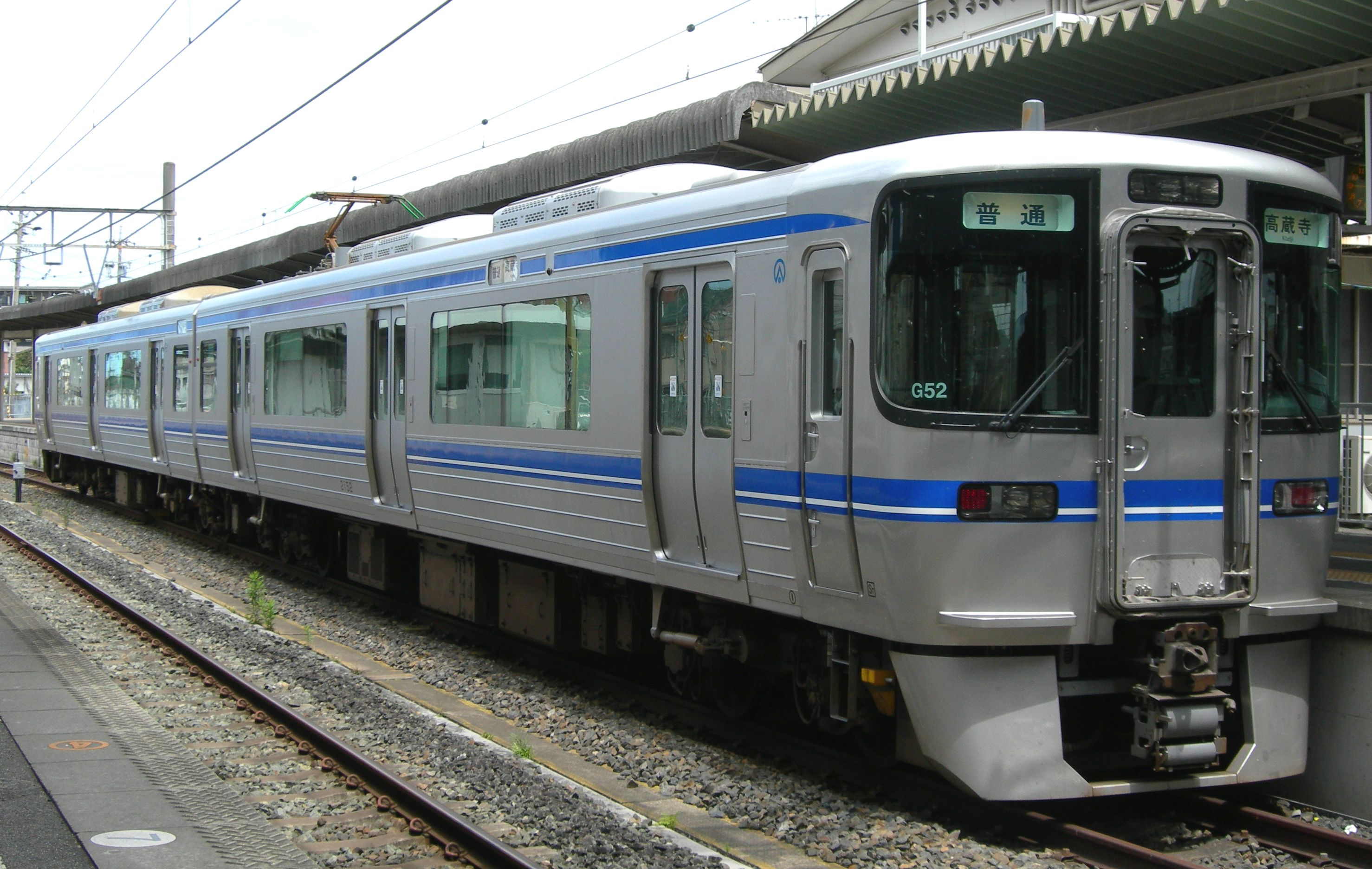
Set G52 in later livery, August 2009

As of 1 April 2012, the fleet consists of 20 two-car sets formed as shown below, with one motored (Mc) car and one trailer (Tc) car.

Designation	Tc	Mc
Numbering	2200	2100
Weight (t)	37.1	31.2
Capacity (total/seated)	146/56	140/51

- Sets G31-G33 have cars numbered in the 213x and 223x series.
- Sets G51-G52 have cars numbered in the 215x and 225x series.
- The Mc cars are equipped with one single-arm pantograph (sets G8-G11 have two pantographs).

== Interior ==
Passenger accommodation consists of fixed facing 4-seat bays with bench seating by the doorways. Sets G51 and G52 have longitudinal seating throughout. The Tc cars have a universal access toilet. The G30 sets were originally configured to allow tables to be installed, and included internal speakers for use with karaoke equipment on special event services, but these features were subsequently removed.

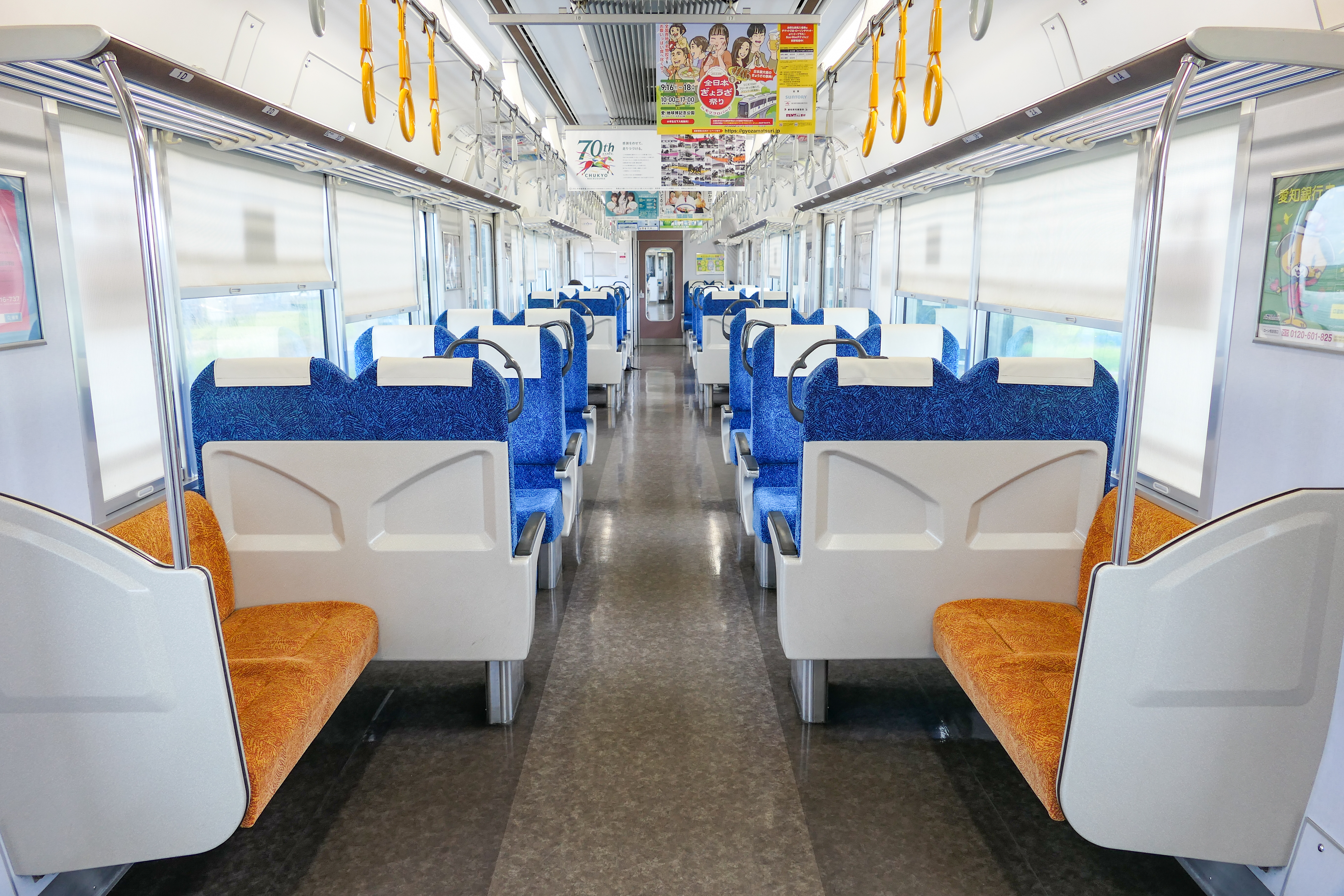
Interior

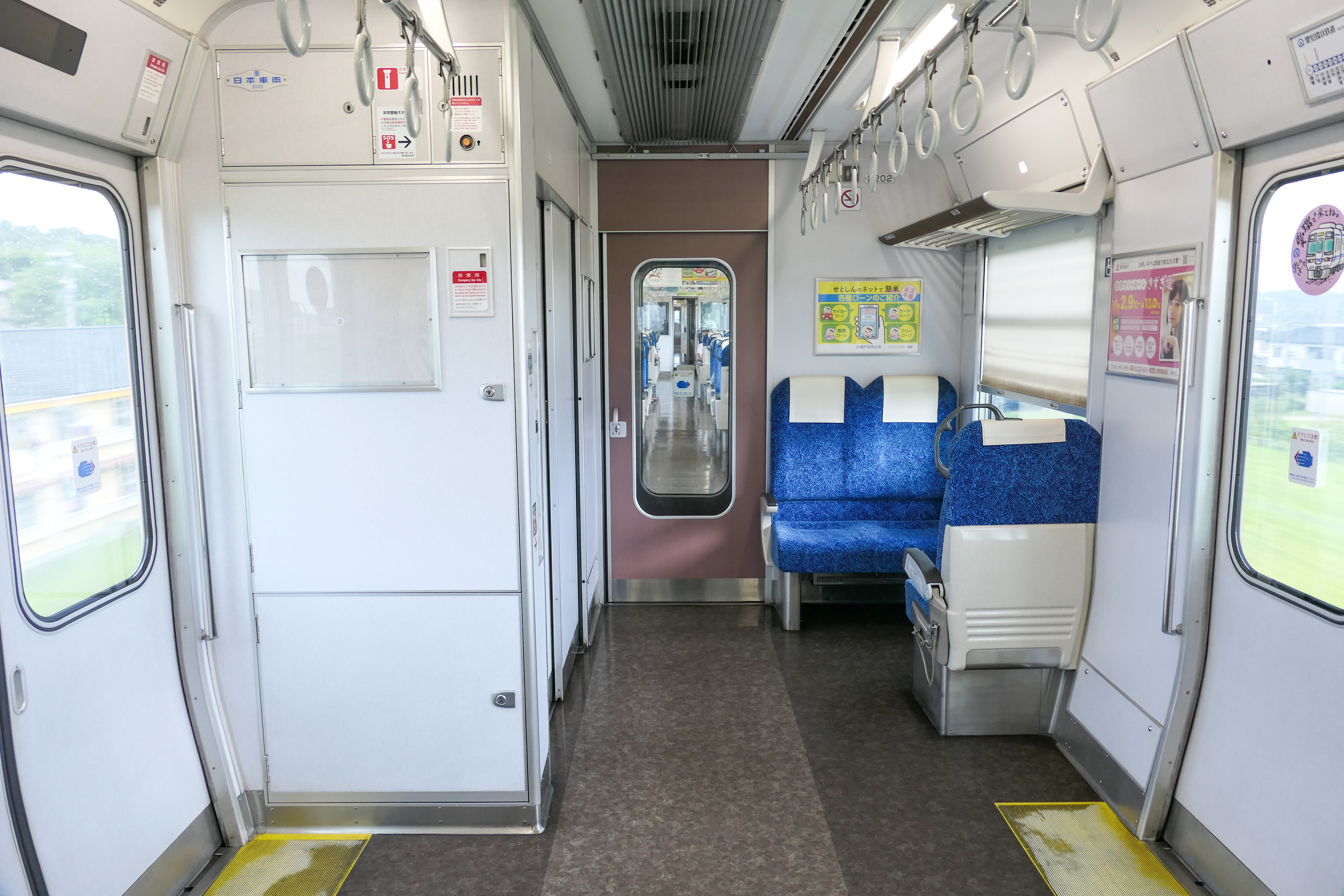
Toilet (at left)

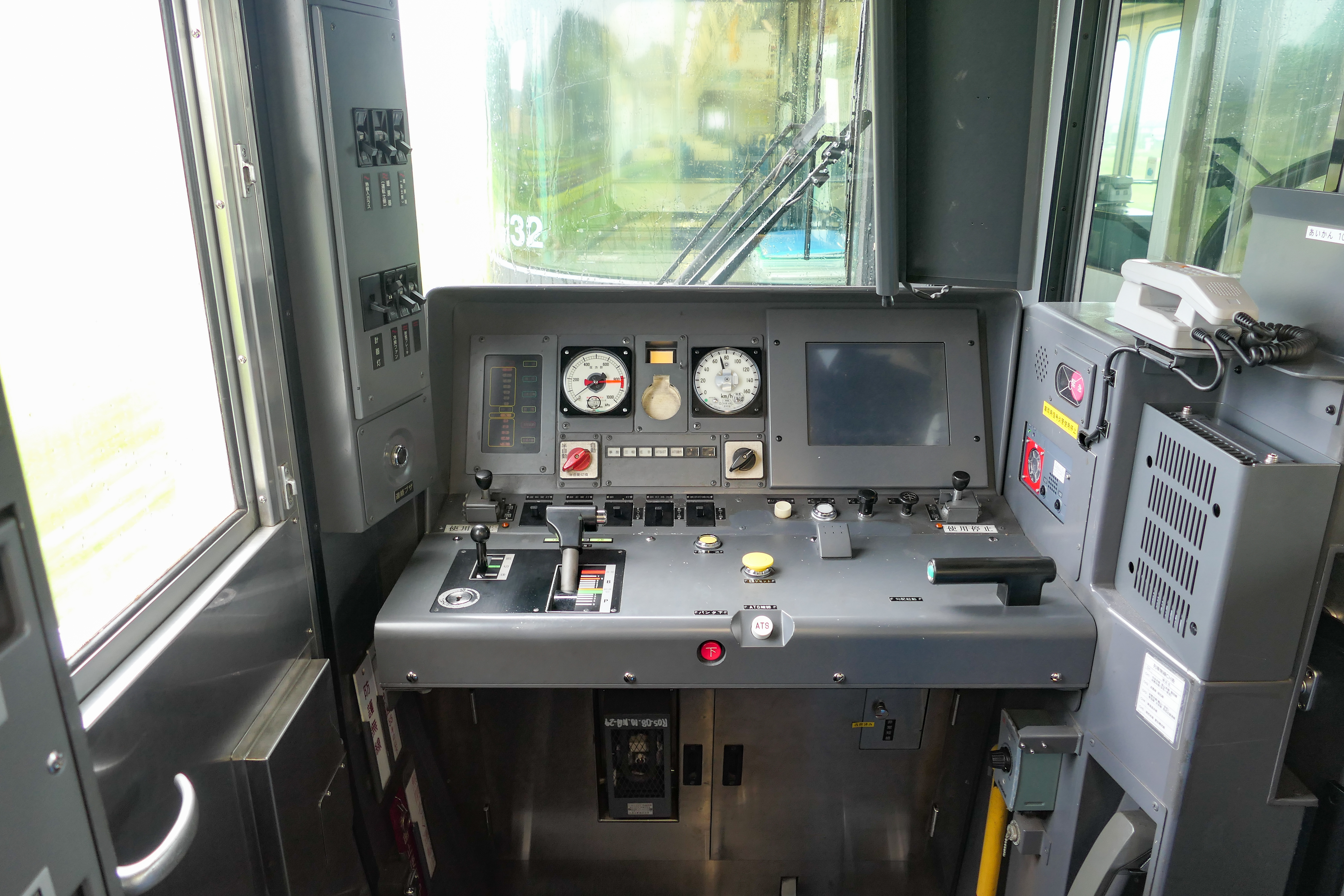
Driver's cab

== History ==
The first four sets, G1-G2 and G31-G32, were delivered to allow driver training between January and March 2003.

From December 2009, the original sets were gradually repainted into the corporate livery with blue bodyside stripes, and the seat moquette was also changed from green to blue.
