= Aichi Loop Line =

Railway line in Aichi prefecture, Japan

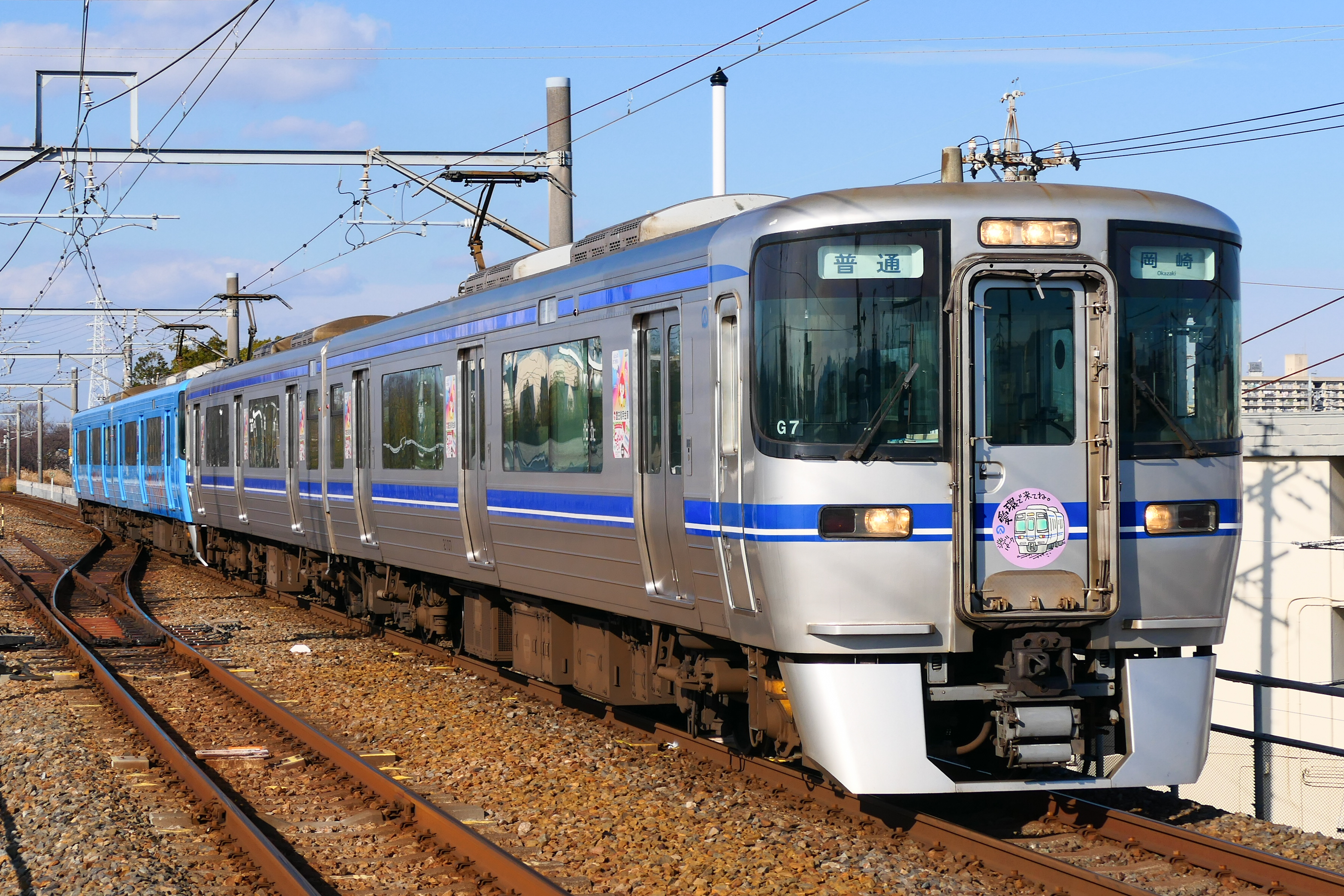
- Local train approaching Mutsuna Station

Overview
- Locale: Aichi Prefecture
- Termini: Okazaki; Kōzōji
- Stations: 23

Service
- Type: Commuter rail
- Operator: Aichi Loop Railway
- Rolling stock: Aichi Loop Railway 2000 series

History
- Opened: January 31, 1988; 38 years ago

Technical
- Track length: 45.3 km
- Track gauge: 1,067 mm (3 ft 6 in)
- Electrification: 1,500 V DC
- Operating speed: 110 km/h (68 mph)
Route map
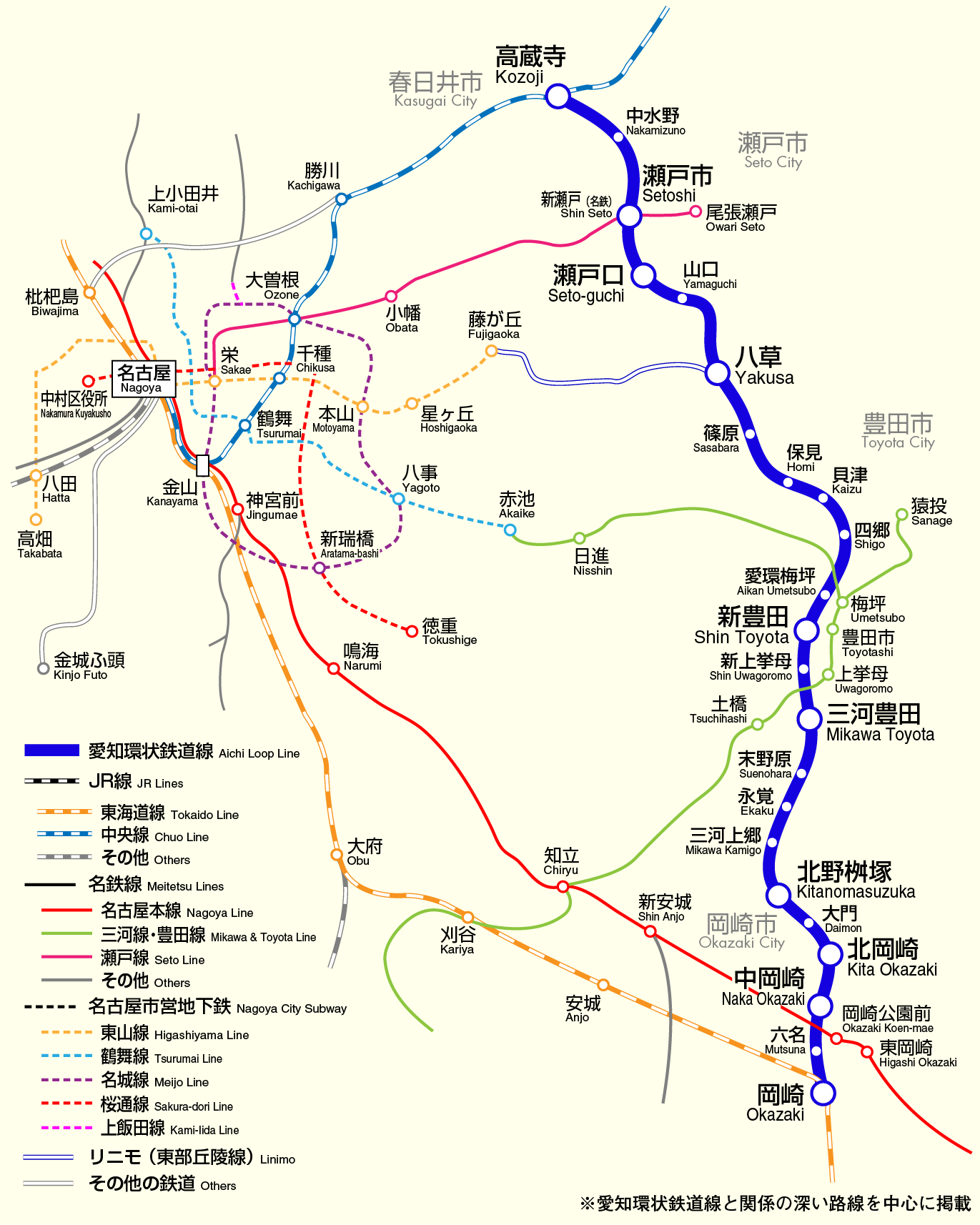
Map of Aichi loop line and other nearby lines

The Aichi Loop Line (愛知環状鉄道線, Aichi Kanjō Tetsudō-sen; 'Aichi Loop Railway Line') is a Japanese railway line connecting Okazaki Station in Okazaki and Kōzōji Station in Kasugai. It is the sole line operated by the third-sector Aichi Loop Railway (愛知環状鉄道, Aichi Kanjō Tetsudō). The line and operating company are both abbreviated as Aikan (愛環).

First proposed in 1927 by the amended Railway Construction Act, the line was originally planned to connect Okazaki to Tajimi, Gifu Prefecture. The line was constructed by the Japan Railway Construction Public Corporation from 1965 to 1970, and opened as a line of the Japanese National Railways on October 1, 1970. Due to financial deficits, the line was transferred to the third-sector company Aichi Loop Railway in 1988. Since then, the company has partially duplicated the line. Shares of the company are held partially by public sector entities such as Aichi Prefecture and Toyota City along with private companies. Unlike typical third-sector lines in Japan, the Aichi Loop Line makes a profit, as it functions as commuter rail for nearby Toyota Motor factories and offices.

Despite its name, and unlike other loop lines in Japan, the line is a not a true loop; however, it can be said to complete a loop with the JR Tokaido Line and Chuo Line serving as other portions of the circle.

== History ==
The line's construction was proposed by the amended Railway Construction Act on March 30, 1927. The line was described as a railway line starting from Okazaki, Aichi Prefecture, passing through Koromo and terminating at Tajimi, Gifu Prefecture. The Ministry of Railways considered establishing bus routes before constructing railway lines for some of the proposed lines that were considered hard to sustain. Out of the seven candidates, this route was selected as the first bus route of this plan. The bus route opened as the Okata Line (岡多線) on December 20, 1930, with seven buses and ten trucks. This bus line has since been abolished in 2002.

Construction of the Okata Line by the Japan Railway Construction Public Corporation commenced on August 13, 1965. Freight operations on the line between Okazaki and Kitano-Masuzuka began on October 1, 1970. The first section of the line between Okazaki and Kitano-Masuzuka opened for passengers in 1970, as a railway line of the Japanese National Railways (JNR). The section between Kitano-Masuzuka and Shin-Toyota was extended and the whole line started a passenger service in 1976. Another part of the line, between Setoshi and Kōzōji, was originally part of a freight line planned as the JNR Seto Line. The line did not do well financially under JNR ownership due to lack of passengers.

The newly founded third-sector Aichi Loop Line Company took over the line, now renamed to the Aichi Loop Line, from Central Japan Railway Company (JR Central), with services starting on January 31, 1988. Beginning on March 1, 2005, through service began with the JR Chuo Main Line to Nagoya Station, initially to carry visitors to the site of Expo 2005. When Toyota began promoting the use of public transit to their employees, the Aichi Loop Railway decided to duplicate the track between Mikawa-Toyota and Shin Toyota Station. The company was funded by the government, Aichi Prefecture, passing municipalities, etc. This work began in 2005, which also changed the track layout of the Mikawa-Toyota Station and relocated the platform in the Shin-Uwagoromo Station. The duplicated tracks entered service in 2008, and the service interval between the section was decreased to eight minutes at peak times. The line became compatible with TOICA, a contactless smart card, on March 2, 2019.

== Network and operations ==
=== Services ===
Three to five trains run in each direction per hour, while one or two trains run in each direction instead during the first and last hours of service. Trains in two-car or four-car formations are operated. Some services operate with reduced cars, or are not operated at all during weekends. The line operates using the Aichi Loop Railway 2000 series.

The line does not form a loop line by itself, although it connects to the Chūō Main Line or the Tōkaidō Main Line on each side of the terminus. Toyota factories and offices, along with various schools, are located alongside the line, and the line transports commuters to those locations, allowing it to turn a profit unlike other formerly JNR-owned third-sector companies.

== Infrastructure ==
=== Rolling stock ===
- Aichi Loop Railway 2000 series (2 or 4 cars)
- JR Central 315 series (through service, 8 cars)

=== Station list ===
Station No.	Station	Japanese	Distance (km)		Transfers	Location
Station No.	Station	Japanese	Between stations	Total	Transfers	Location
01	Okazaki	岡崎	-	0.0	Tōkaidō Main Line	Okazaki
02	Mutsuna	六名	1.7	1.7		Okazaki
03	Naka-Okazaki	中岡崎	1.7	3.4	Meitetsu Nagoya Line (Okazaki-Kōen-Mae)	Okazaki
04	Kita-Okazaki	北岡崎	1.9	5.3		Okazaki
05	Daimon	大門	1.2	6.5		Okazaki
06	Kitano-Masuzuka	北野桝塚	2.2	8.7		Okazaki
07	Mikawa-Kamigō	三河上郷	2.0	10.7		Toyota
08	Ekaku	永覚	1.7	12.4		Toyota
09	Suenohara	末野原	1.6	14.0		Toyota
10	Mikawa-Toyota	三河豊田	1.9	15.9		Toyota
11	Shin-Uwagoromo	新上挙母	1.7	17.6	Meitetsu Mikawa Line (Uwagoromo)	Toyota
12	Shin-Toyota	新豊田	1.9	19.5	Meitetsu Mikawa (Toyota) Line (Toyotashi)	Toyota
13	Aikan-Umetsubo	愛環梅坪	2.0	21.5		Toyota
14	Shigō	四郷	2.0	23.5		Toyota
15	Kaizu	貝津	2.0	25.5		Toyota
16	Homi	保見	1.3	26.8		Toyota
17	Sasabara	篠原	2.4	29.2		Toyota
18	Yakusa	八草	2.8	32.0	Linimo (L09)	Toyota
19	Yamaguchi	山口	2.6	34.6		Seto
20	Setoguchi	瀬戸口	2.1	36.7		Seto
21	Setoshi	瀬戸市	2.4	39.1	Meitetsu Seto Line (Shin-Seto)	Seto
22	Nakamizuno	中水野	2.8	41.9		Seto
23	Kōzōji	高蔵寺	3.4	45.3	Chūō Main Line	Kasugai
↓Limited through service to/from Nagoya via the Chūō Main Line↓

== See also ==
- List of railway lines in Japan
- JR-Central Transport Service Jōhoku Line
- Musashino Line, semi-closed outer loop around Tokyo
- Osaka Higashi Line
