= Shin-Toyota Station =

Railway station in Toyota, Aichi Prefecture, Japan

Shin-Toyota Station 新豊田駅
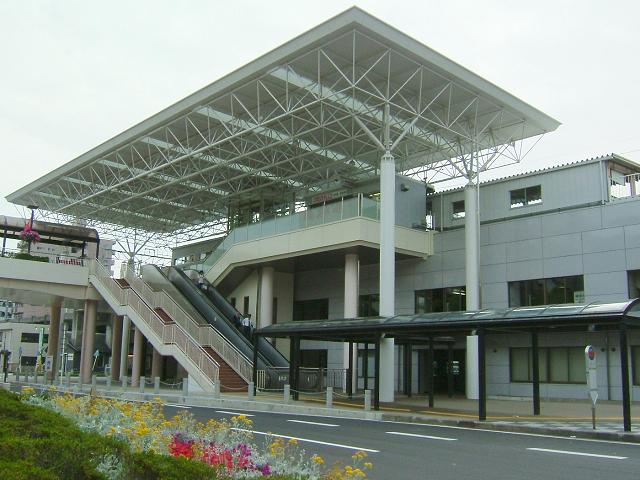
- Shin-Toyota Station, June 2005

General information
- Location: 1-16 Kozakahonmachi, Toyota-shi, Aichi-ken 471-0034; Japan
- Coordinates: 35.0881°N 137.1539°E
- Operator: Aichi Loop Railway
- Line: ■ Aichi Loop Line
- Distance: 19.5 kilometers from Okazaki
- Platforms: 2 side platforms

Other information
- Status: Staffed
- Station code: 12
- Website: Official website

History
- Opened: April 26, 1976

Passengers
- FY2017: 14,915 daily
Location
- Location within Aichi Prefecture Location within Japan

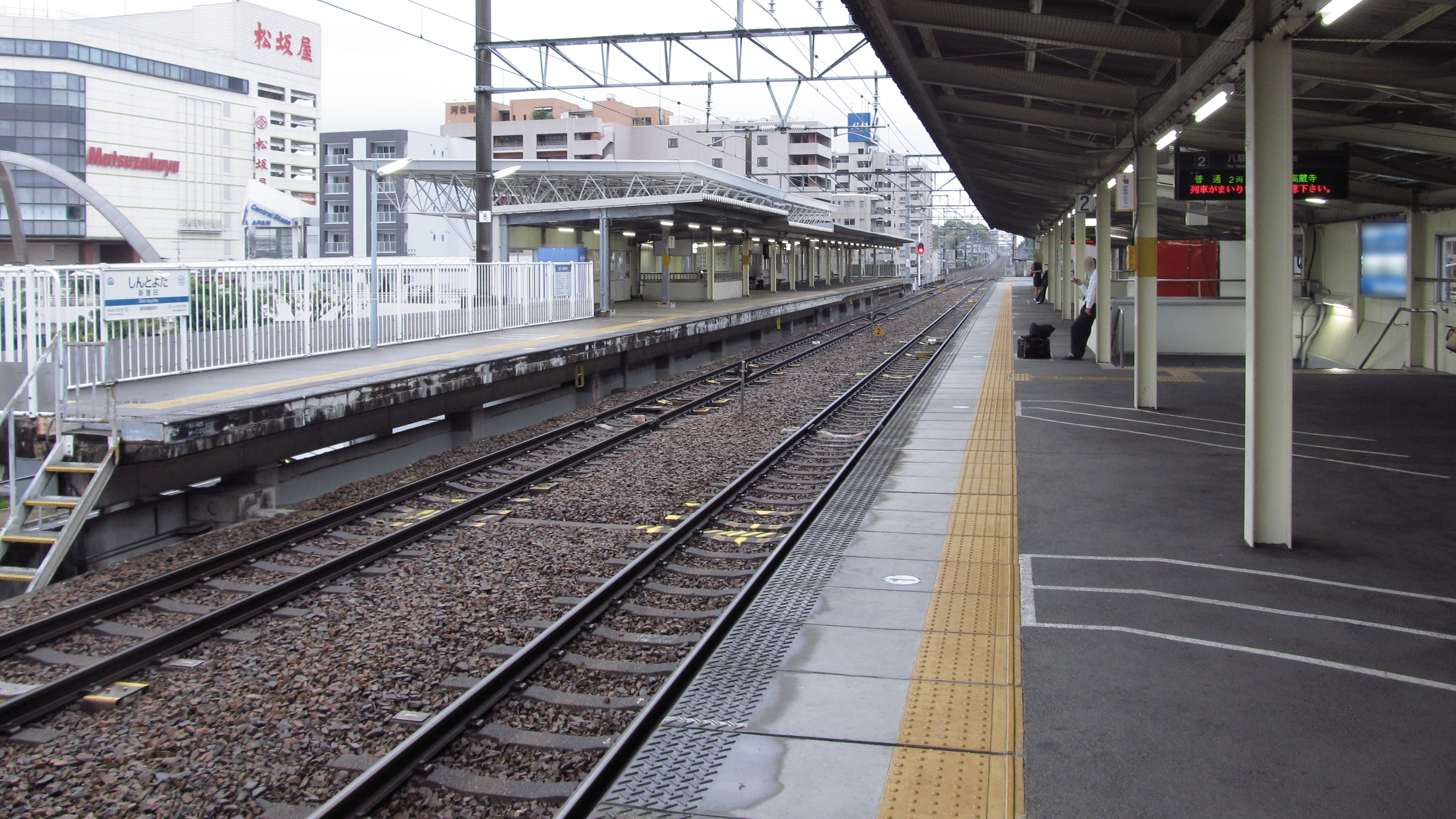
Platforms in May 2015

Track layout

Shin-Toyota Station (新豊田駅, Shin-Toyota-eki) is a railway station in the city of Toyota, Aichi Prefecture, Japan, operated by the third sector Aichi Loop Railway Company.

== Lines ==
Shin-Toyota Station is served by the Aichi Loop Line, and is located 19.5 kilometers from the starting point of the line at Okazaki.

== Station layout ==
The station has two elevated side platforms, with the station building located underneath. The station building has automated ticket machines, TOICA automated turnstiles and is staffed.

=== Platforms ===
1	■ Aichi Loop Line	For Okazaki
2	■ Aichi Loop Line	For Kōzōji

== Adjacent stations ==
«	Service	»
Aichi Loop Line
Shin-Uwagoromo	-	Aikan-Umetsubo

== Station history ==
Shin-Toyota Station was opened on April 26, 1976, as a passenger station on the Japan National Railways (JNR) Okata Line connecting Okazaki with Shin-Toyota. With the privatization of the JNR on April 1, 1987, the station came under control of JR Central. The station was transferred to the Aichi Loop Railway Company on January 31, 1988. The station building was rebuilt in 1991.

== Passenger statistics ==
In fiscal 2017, the station was used by an average of 14,915 passengers daily.

== Surrounding area ==
- Toyota City Hall
- Toyota Municipal Museum of Art

== See also ==
- List of railway stations in Japan
