= Kōzōji Station =

Railway station in Kasugai, Aichi Prefecture, Japan

CF09 Kōzōji Station 高蔵寺駅
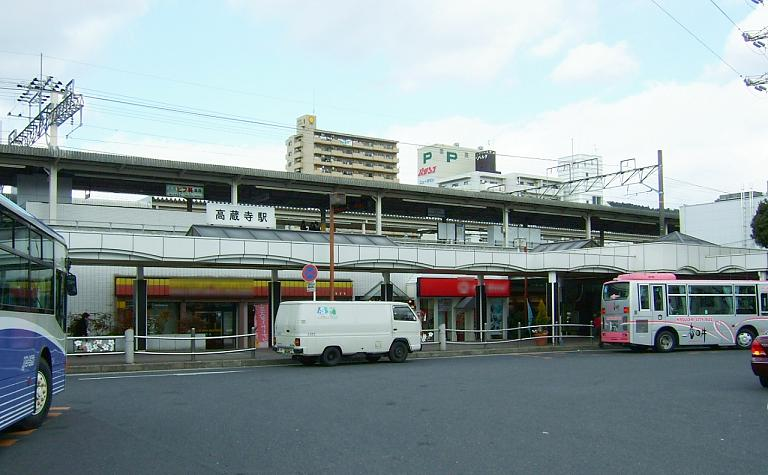
- Kōzōji Station, February 2005

General information
- Location: 3-654-1 Kōzōji, Kasugai-shi, Aichi-ken; Japan
- Coordinates: 35°15′51.4″N 137°2′36.9″E
- Operator: JR Central; Aichi Loop Railway
- Lines: Chūō Main Line; ■ Aichi Loop Line
- Distance: 372.9 kilometers from Tokyo
- Platforms: 3 island platforms

Other information
- Status: Staffed
- Station code: CF09, 23
- Website: Official website (JR); Official website (Aikan)

History
- Opened: 25 July 1900; 126 years ago

Passengers
- FY2017: 20,256 daily (JR), 10,872 (Aikan)
Location
- Location within Aichi Prefecture Location within Japan

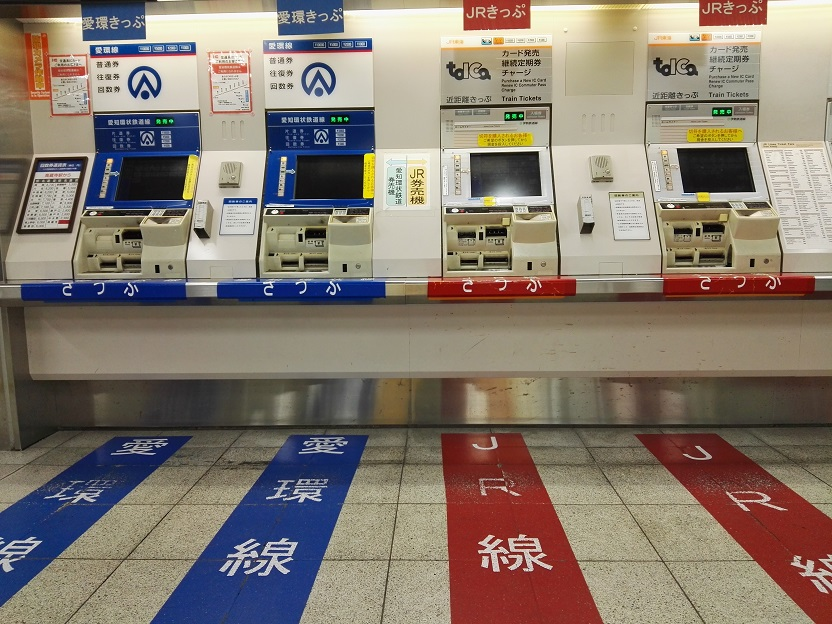
Ticket vending machines

Kōzōji Station (高蔵寺駅, Kōzōji-eki) is a railway station in the city of Kasugai, Aichi Prefecture, Japan, jointly operated by Central Japan Railway Company (JR Tōkai) and the Aichi Kanjō Railway (Aikan).

== Lines ==
Kōzōji Station is served by the Chūō Main Line, and is located 372.9 kilometers from the starting point of the line at Tokyo Station and 24.0 kilometers from Nagoya Station. It is also the northern terminus of the Aichi Loop Line and is 45.3 kilometers from the southern terminus at Okazaki Station.

== Station layout ==
The station has three elevated island platforms with the station building underneath. The station building has automated ticket machines, TOICA, Manaca, Suica and PASMO automated turnstiles and a staffed ticket office.

=== Platforms ===
1	■ Aichi Loop Line	For Setoshi, Shin-Toyota
2, 3	■ Chūō Main Line	For Nagoya
4, 5	■ Chūō Main Line	For Tajimi, Nakatsugawa

== Adjacent stations ==
«	Service	»
Aichi Loop Line
Nakamizuno	-	Terminus
Chūō Main Line
Jōkōji	-	Jinryō

== Station history ==
Kōzōji Station was opened on 25 July 1900. Along with the division and privatization of JNR on 1 April 1987, the station came under the control and operation of the Central Japan Railway Company. The Aichi Loop Railway began operations from 31 January 1988.

== Passenger statistics ==
In fiscal 2017, the JR portion of the station was used by an average of 20,256 passengers daily (arriving passengers only) and the Aichi Loop Railway portion by 10,872.

Year	Chuo Main Line (JR)	Aichi Loop Line
2003	21,555	3,100
2004	21,619	3,682
2005	28,780	3,837
2006	21,800	4,048
2007	21,191	4,337
2008	21,331	9,169
2009	20,618	9,194
2010	20,471	9,659
2011	20,290	10,101
2012	20,184	10,254
2013	20,394	10,151
2014	19,950	10,073
2015	20,090	10,414
2016	20,072	10,620

== Surrounding area ==
- site of Shirayama Castle
- Kōzōji New Town

== See also ==
- List of railway stations in Japan
