= Okazaki Station =

Railway station in Okazaki, Aichi Prefecture, Japan

CA52 Okazaki Station 岡崎駅
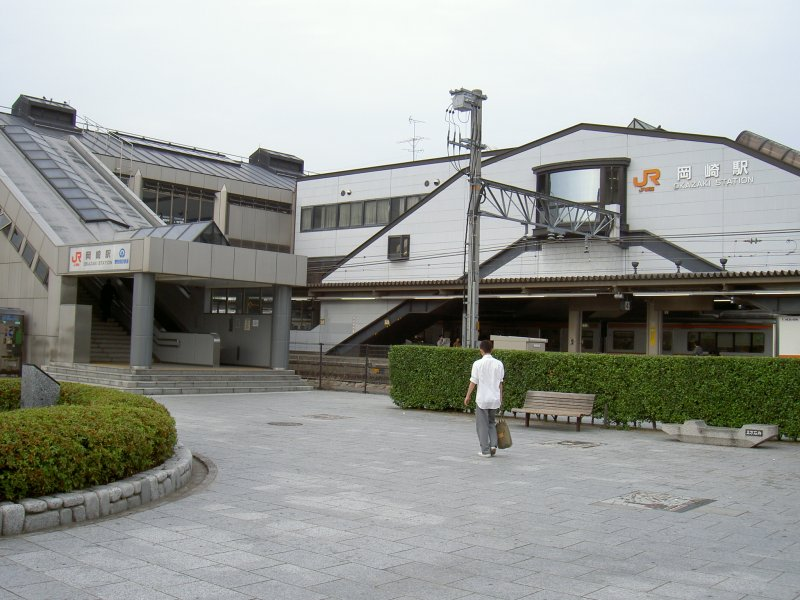
- West gate of Okazaki Station in June 2005

General information
- Location: Higashiarako Hanecho, Okazaki-shi, Aichi-ken; Japan
- Coordinates: 34.9255953°N 137.1573114°E
- Operator: JR Central; Aichi Loop Railway
- Lines: Tōkaidō Main Line; ■ Aichi Loop Line
- Distance: 325.9 kilometers from Tokyo
- Platforms: 2 island + 1 side platforms

Other information
- Status: Staffed
- Station code: CA52, 01
- Website: Official website (JR); Official website (Aikan)

History
- Opened: September 1, 1888

Passengers
- 2023–2024: 32,459 daily (JR); 9,804 daily (Aichi Loop Railway)
Location
- Location within Aichi Prefecture Location within Japan

Track layout

Okazaki Station (岡崎駅, Okazaki-eki) is an interchange railway station in the city of Okazaki, Aichi Prefecture, Japan, jointly operated by Central Japan Railway Company (JR Tōkai) and the Aichi Loop Railway.

== Lines ==
Okazaki Station is served by the Tōkaidō Main Line, and is located 325.9 kilometers from the starting point of the line at Tokyo Station. It is also the southern terminus of the Aichi Loop Line and is 45.3 kilometers from the northern terminus at Kōzōji Station.

== Station layout ==
The station consists of two island platforms serving 4 tracks, and a side platform with one track. It shared facilities for the Tōkaidō Main Line and the Aichi Loop Line. The station building has automated ticket machines, TOICA, Manaca, Suica and PASMO automated turnstiles and a staffed ticket office.

=== Platforms ===
0	■ Aichi Loop Line	Shin-Toyota, Kozoji

1	■ Tōkaidō Main Line	Toyohashi, Hamamatsu
1	■ Tōkaidō Main Line	Ōbu, Nagoya
2	■ Tōkaidō Main Line	Toyohashi, Hamamatsu
3	■ Tōkaidō Main Line	Ōbu, Nagoya
4	■ Tōkaidō Main Line	Ōbu, Nagoya

== Adjacent stations ==
«	Service	»
Aichi Loop Line
Terminus	-	Mutsuna
Tōkaidō Main Line
Gamagori	Special Rapid	Anjō
Kōda	New Rapid	Anjō
Kōda	Rapid	Anjō
Kōda	Sectional Rapid	Anjō
Aimi	Local	Nishi-Okazaki

== Station history ==
Okazaki Station was opened September 1, 1888 when the section of the Japanese Government Railways (JGR) line connecting Hamamatsu with Obu was completed. This line was named Tōkaidō Line in 1895, and the Tōkaidō Main Line in 1909. The Nishio Railway began operations to Okazaki Station from October 30, 1911 (later taken over by Meitetsu, operations were discontinued in 1943). In 1930, the first bus system operated by the national government began operations from Okazaki Station. After World War II, the JGR became the Japan National Railway (JNR). A portion of the former Nishio Line was reopened in December 1951 as the "Fukuoka Line", which operated to June 1962. The JNR Okata Line (the forerunner of the Aichi Loop Line) began freight operations in October 1970 and passenger operations in April 1976. However, freight operations were discontinued in January 1984. With the privatization and dissolution of the JNR on April 1, 1987, the station came under the control of the Central Japan Railway Company. A new elevated station building was completed in October 1990.

Station numbering was introduced to the section of the Tōkaidō Line operated JR Central in March 2018; Okazaki Station was assigned station number CA52.

== Passenger statistics ==
In fiscal 2017, the JR portion of the station was used by an average of 18,138 passengers daily (arriving passengers only) and the Aichi Loop Railway portion by 5,198.

== Surrounding area ==
- Okazaki City Hall
- Okazaki Technical High School
- Okazaki Minami Junior High School

== See also ==
- List of railway stations in Japan
