= The Japanese Red Cross Hiroshima College of Nursing =

Coordinates: 34°20′09″N 132°18′32″E

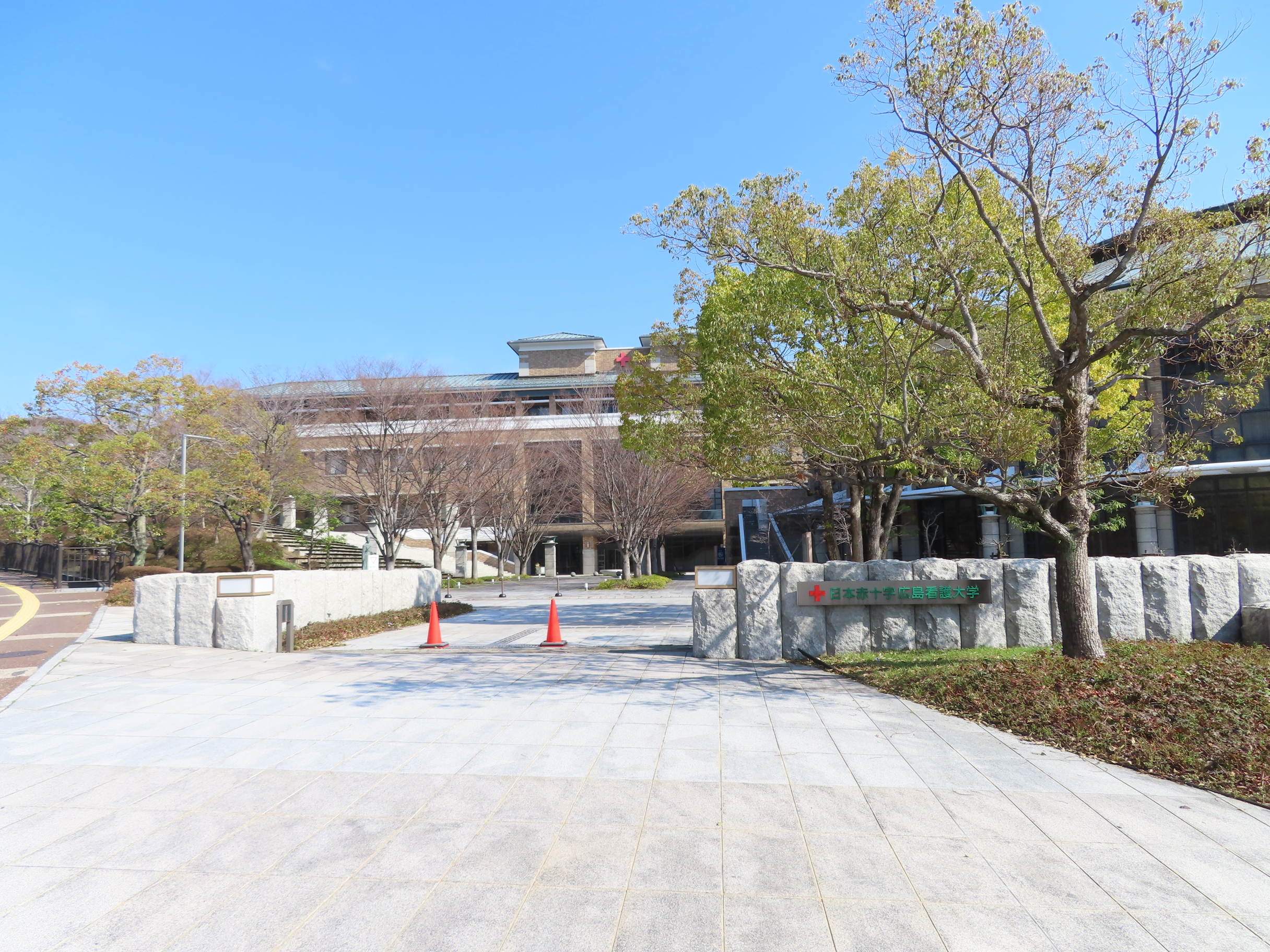
The Japanese Red Cross Hiroshima College of Nursing

The Japanese Red Cross Hiroshima College of Nursing (日本赤十字広島看護大学, Nihon sekijugi jogakuin daigaku) is a private university in Hatsukaichi, Hiroshima, Japan, established in 2000.

== Academics ==
=== Undergraduate school ===
- Faculty of Nursing (with the start of a four-year curriculum in 2000)

=== Graduate school ===
- Masterʼs Program in Nursing (Master's program was started in 2004)

== Affiliates ==
- Japanese Red Cross Hokkaido College of Nursing
- The Japanese Red Cross Akita College of Nursing
- The Japanese Red Cross College of Akita
- Japanese Red Cross College of Nursing
- Japanese Red Cross Toyota College of Nursing
- The Japanese Red Cross Kyushu International College of Nursing

== See also ==
- List of universities in Japan
