= Tokoro River =

River in Hokkaidō, Japan

Tokoro River 常呂川
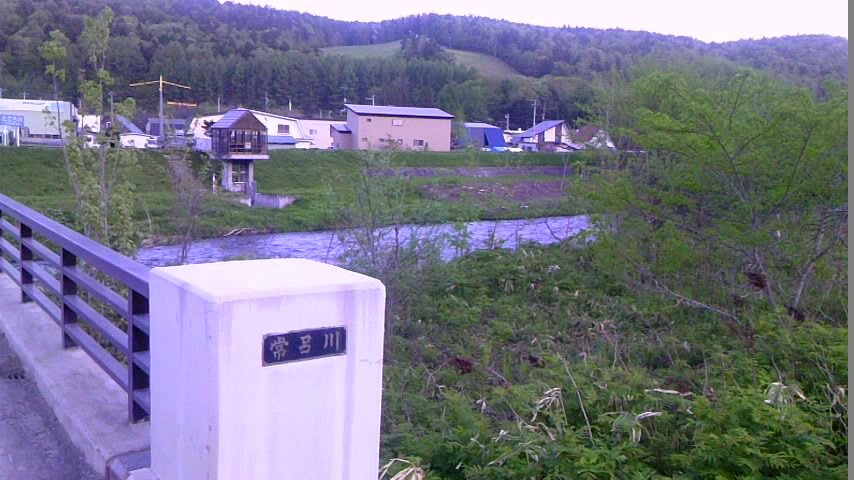

- Location within Japan
- Native name: Tokoro-gawa (Japanese)

Location
- Country: Japan
- State: Hokkaido
- Region: Okhotsk
- District: Kitami, Tokoro
- Municipality: Oketo

Physical characteristics
- Source: Mount Mikuni
  - location: Oketo, Hokkaido, Japan
  - elevation: 940 m (3,080 ft)
- Mouth: Sea of Okhotsk
  - location: Kitami, Hokkaido, Japan
  - elevation: 0 m (0 ft)
- Length: 120 km (75 mi)
- Basin size: 1,930 km^{2} (750 sq mi)
- Discharge
  - average: 26.41 m^{3}/s (933 cu ft/s)

The Tokoro River (常呂川, Tokoro-gawa) is a Class A river in Hokkaido, Japan.

The Tokoro River, which has its source in Mount Mikuni (alt. 1,541 m), flows through Oketo and Kunneppu and into the Sea of Okhotsk from Kitami. Many white-tailed eagles and Steller's sea eagles that have been designated as protected species by the national government are observed in its basin. A colony of purple azalea designated as a natural monument by the Hokkaido government and a forest of large-diameter Japanese elm trees along the Muka River, which flows parallel to the Tokoro River, are symbols of the region. At the Tokoro River Estuary Site, relics, remains of pit-dwellings and tomb pits from the Jōmon period have been found.
