= Tanno, Hokkaido =

Tanno 端野町
- Town
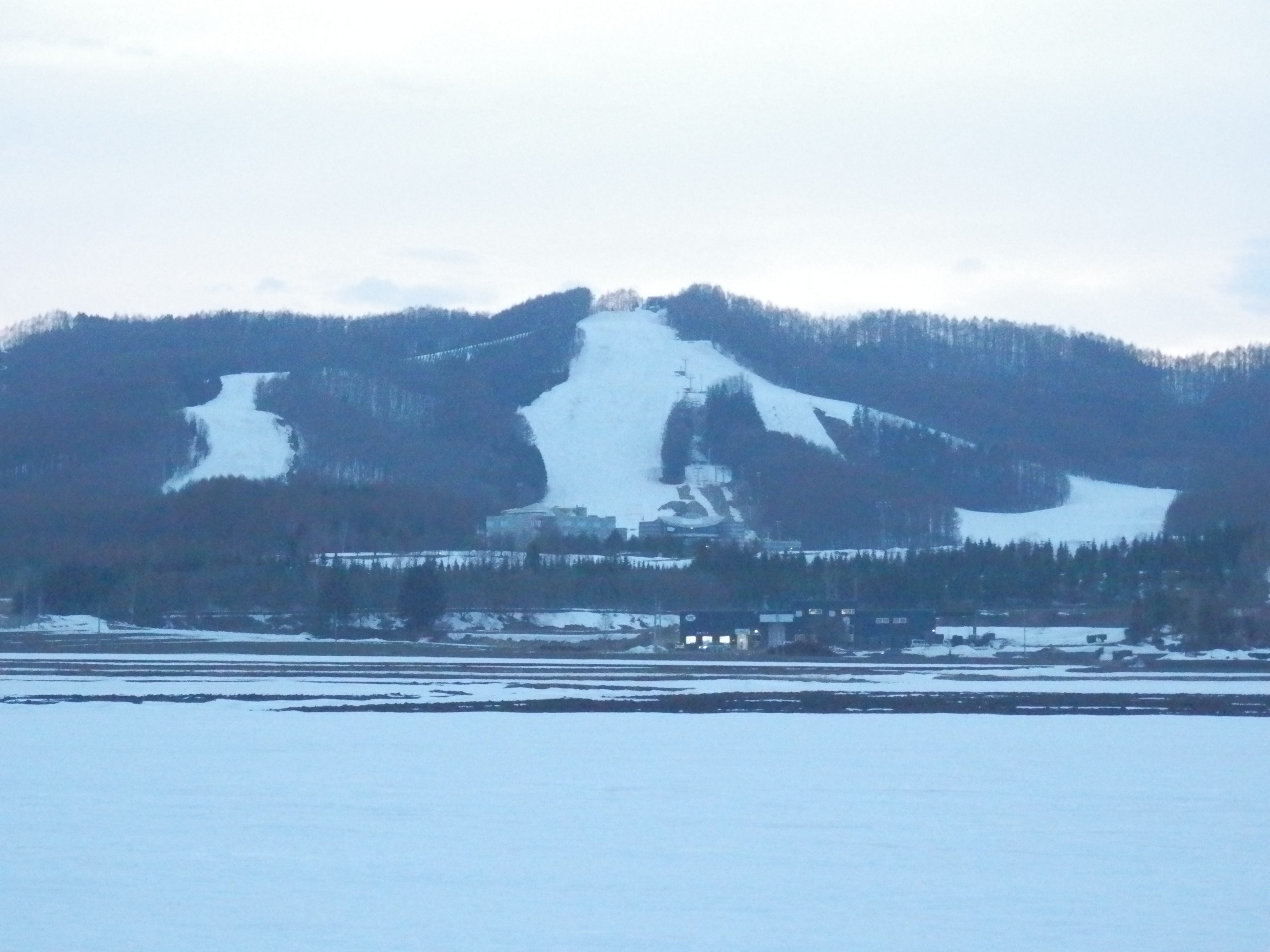
- Northern Arc resort

- Flag Emblem

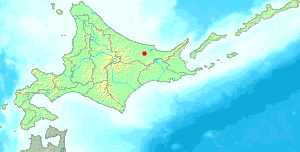
- Location of Tanno in Hokkaido (Okhotsk Subprefecture)

- Location in Japan
- Coordinates: 43°51′N 143°56′E
- Country: Japan
- Region: Hokkaido
- Prefecture: Hokkaido (Okhotsk Subprefecture)
- Now part of Kitami: March 5, 2006

Area
  - Total: 163.50 km^{2} (63.13 sq mi)

Population (December 31, 2005)
  - Total: 5,496
  - Density: 33.61/km^{2} (87.0/sq mi)
- Time zone: UTC+09:00 (JST)
- City hall address: 471-1, Niku, Tanno-cho, Tokoro-gun, Hokkaido; 099-2192
- Website: web.archive.org/web/20050308163850/http://www.ohotuku26.or.jp/organization/tanno/tanno.html
- Symbols
- Flower: Rhododendron
- Tree: Betula platyphylla

Tanno (端野町, Tanno-chō) was a town located in Tokoro District, Abashiri Subprefecture (now Okhotsk Subprefecture), Hokkaido, Japan.

As of 2005, the town had an estimated population of 5,496 and a density of 33.61 persons per km^{2}. The total area was 163.50 km^{2}. The name comes from the Ainu nufu-un-keshi meaning "edge of the field." The two kanji characters in the name Tanno mean "edge" and "field."

On March 5, 2006, Tanno, along with the towns of Rubeshibe and Tokoro (all from Tokoro District), was merged into the expanded city of Kitami.
