= Kiyofumi =

- Gender: Male

Origin
- Origin: Japanese
- Meaning: Different meanings depending on the kanji used

Kiyofumi (written: 清史 or 清文) is a masculine Japanese given name. Notable people with the name include:

- Kiyofumi Nagai (永井 清史) (born 1983), Japanese cyclist
- Kiyofumi Ohno (大野 清文) (born 1978), Japanese singer-songwriter
