= Tokoro, Hokkaido =

Tokoro 常呂町
- Town
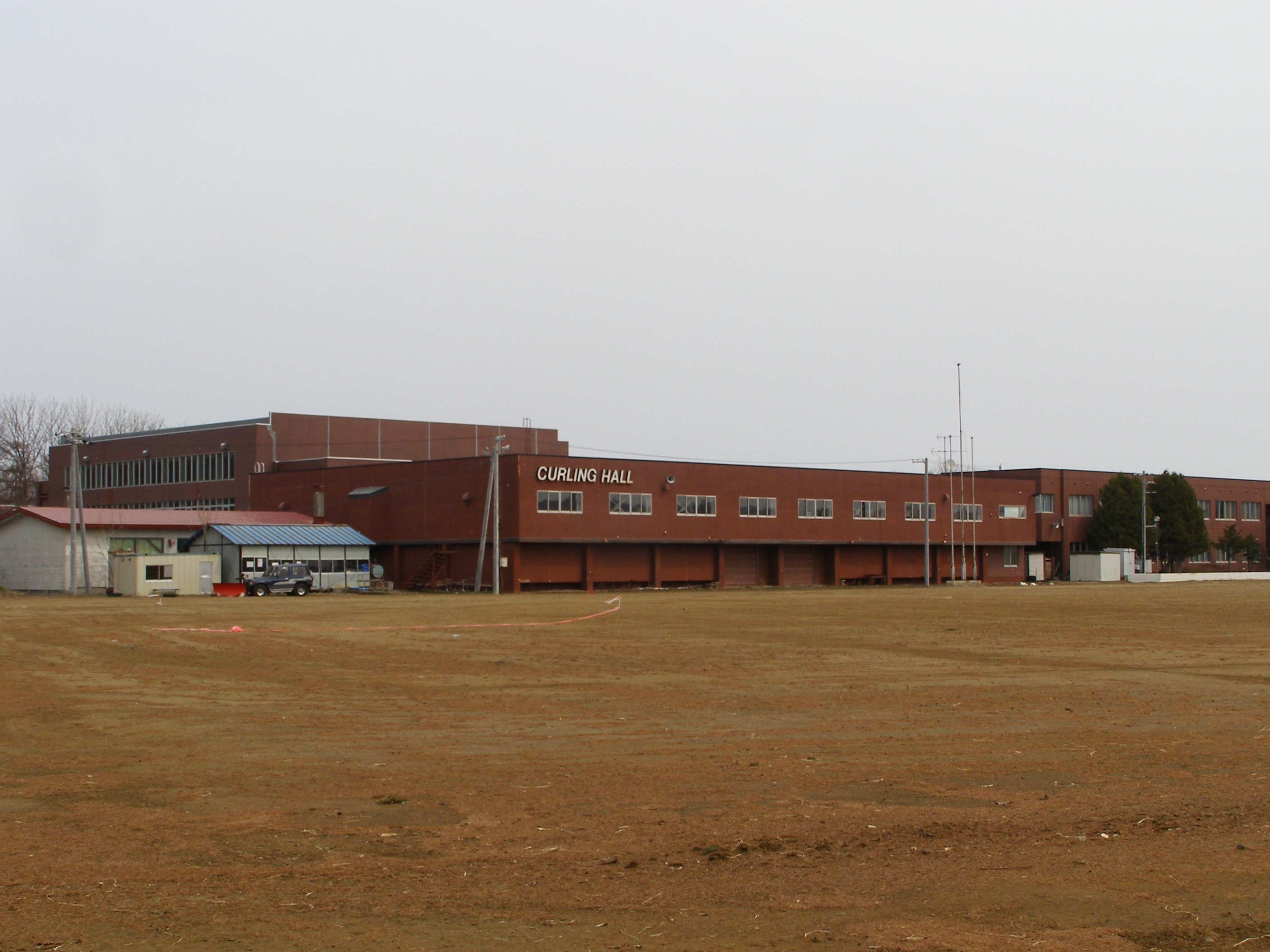
- Exterior view of the former Tokoro Town Curling Hall facility (2011)

- Flag Emblem

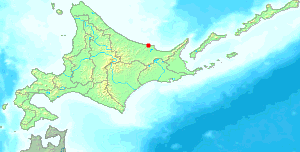
- Location of Tokoro in Hokkaido (Okhotsk Subprefecture)

- Location in Japan
- Coordinates: 44°7′N 144°4′E
- Country: Japan
- Region: Hokkaido
- Prefecture: Hokkaido (Okhotsk Subprefecture)
- Now part of Kitami: March 5, 2006

Area
  - Total: 278.29 km^{2} (107.45 sq mi)

Population (February 28, 2006)
  - Total: 4,889
  - Density: 17.57/km^{2} (45.5/sq mi)
- Time zone: UTC+09:00 (JST)
- City hall address: 323, Aza-Tokoro, Tokoro Town, Tokoro County, Hokkaido, Japan; 093-0292
- Website: web.archive.org/web/20051212191540/http://www.town.tokoro.hokkaido.jp/cgi-bin/odb-get.exe?WIT_template=AM020000
- Symbols
- Flower: Clematis
- Tree: Sorbus commixta

Tokoro (常呂町, Tokoro-chō) is a small town, formerly an independent administrative division located in Tokoro District, Abashiri Subprefecture (now Okhotsk Subprefecture), Hokkaido, Japan. On March 5, 2006, the division, along with the towns of Rubeshibe and Tanno (all from Tokoro District), was merged into a part of the expanded city of Kitami, and became Tokoro Town, Kitami City.

== Demographics ==
As of 2006, the town had an estimated population of 4,889 and a density of 17.57 persons per km^{2}. The total area was 278.29 km^{2}.

== Curling ==
The town had a strong association with the sport of curling following a friendship visit in 1980 by a curling team from Alberta in Canada. An outdoor curling rink was built the following year, and it hosted the 1st NHK Cup Curling Championship. In January 1988, the town built a dedicated 5-lane curling hall, the first in Japan. This eventually closed in early 2013, replaced by a new, larger, all-year-round structure.

Curling was introduced in schools in Tokoro as part of the physical education curriculum, and the two produced a number of Olympic curlers. Five members of the Japanese curling team at the 1998 Winter Olympics in Nagano were from Tokoro, three members of the Japanese curling team at the 2006 Winter Olympics in Torino were from Tokoro, and three members of the Japanese curling team at the 2010 Winter Olympics in Vancouver were from Tokoro.

== Climate ==
Climate data for Tokoro, Hokkaido (1991−2020 normals, extremes 1977−present)
Month	Jan	Feb	Mar	Apr	May	Jun	Jul	Aug	Sep	Oct	Nov	Dec	Year
Record high °C (°F)	7.8 (46.0)	12.4 (54.3)	16.6 (61.9)	30.8 (87.4)	35.2 (95.4)	32.7 (90.9)	36.7 (98.1)	36.9 (98.4)	32.6 (90.7)	31.4 (88.5)	20.9 (69.6)	16.4 (61.5)	36.9 (98.4)
Mean daily maximum °C (°F)	−2.4 (27.7)	−2.3 (27.9)	1.9 (35.4)	9.2 (48.6)	15.2 (59.4)	18.5 (65.3)	22.3 (72.1)	24.1 (75.4)	21.1 (70.0)	15.1 (59.2)	7.5 (45.5)	0.4 (32.7)	10.9 (51.6)
Daily mean °C (°F)	−6.5 (20.3)	−6.9 (19.6)	−2.2 (28.0)	4.3 (39.7)	9.9 (49.8)	13.6 (56.5)	17.7 (63.9)	19.6 (67.3)	16.3 (61.3)	10.1 (50.2)	3.3 (37.9)	−3.4 (25.9)	6.3 (43.4)
Mean daily minimum °C (°F)	−12.2 (10.0)	−13.6 (7.5)	−7.4 (18.7)	−0.5 (31.1)	4.8 (40.6)	9.3 (48.7)	13.8 (56.8)	15.7 (60.3)	11.6 (52.9)	4.9 (40.8)	−1.0 (30.2)	−8.5 (16.7)	1.4 (34.5)
Record low °C (°F)	−29.6 (−21.3)	−31.2 (−24.2)	−26.8 (−16.2)	−14.7 (5.5)	−3.5 (25.7)	−1.3 (29.7)	3.8 (38.8)	5.7 (42.3)	1.4 (34.5)	−3.6 (25.5)	−15.3 (4.5)	−24.2 (−11.6)	−31.2 (−24.2)
Average precipitation mm (inches)	30.3 (1.19)	19.6 (0.77)	22.0 (0.87)	35.7 (1.41)	54.8 (2.16)	65.0 (2.56)	91.0 (3.58)	112.0 (4.41)	111.2 (4.38)	76.5 (3.01)	50.6 (1.99)	42.2 (1.66)	710.6 (27.98)
Average precipitation days (≥ 1.0 mm)	10.1	7.6	7.3	8.1	10.0	9.8	10.6	11.3	11.4	10.6	10.3	10.3	117.2
Mean monthly sunshine hours	98.2	124.6	171.7	181.9	185.5	170.7	166.7	170.4	167.4	152.8	116.6	99.3	1,805.9
Source: JMA
