= Japanese Red Cross College of Nursing =

- 日本赤十字看護大学
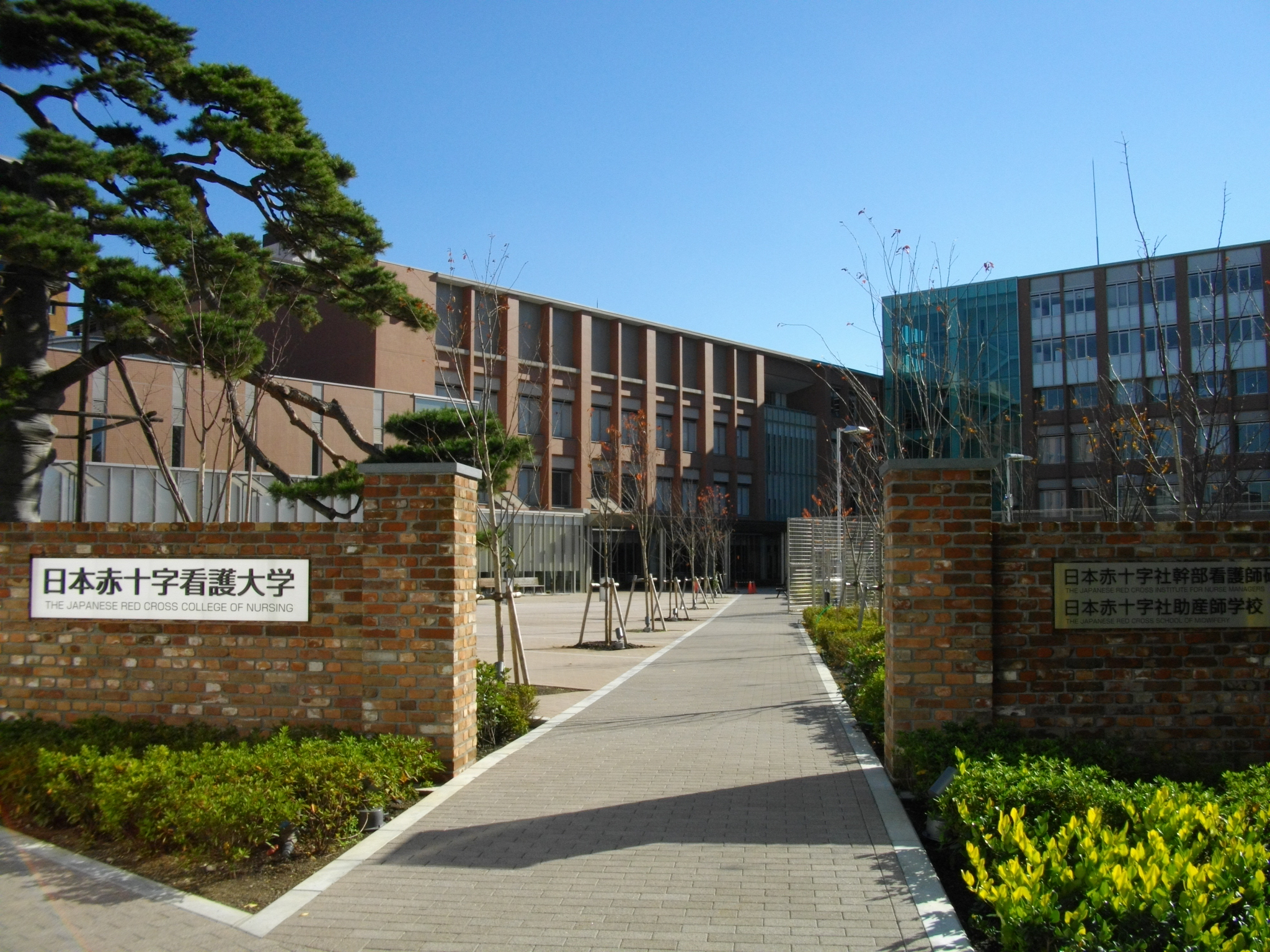
- Japanese Red Cross College of Nursing
- Type: Private university
- Location: Hiroo, Shibuya, Tokyo, Japan
- Campus: Hiroo Campus 35°39′11.4″N 139°43′8.1″E Musashino Campus 35°41′43.5″N 139°32′55.4″E
- Website: http://www.redcross.ac.jp/english/index.html

Japanese Red Cross College of Nursing (日本赤十字看護大学, Nihon sekijūji kango daigaku) is a private university in Hiroo, Shibuya, Tokyo, Japan with an auxiliary suburban campus in Musashino, Tokyo.

== History ==
Nursing education was started at the Japanese Red Cross Hospital in 1890. And The Japanese Red Cross Junior College for Women was established in 1954.

== Undergraduate Schools ==
- Faculty of Nursing (With the start of a four-year curriculum in 1986)

== Graduate Schools ==
- Master's Program in Nursing (Master's program was started in 1993)
- Doctoral Program (The Doctor's program was started in 1995)

== Affiliates of the University ==
- Japanese Red Cross Hokkaido College of Nursing
- Japanese Red Cross Toyota College of Nursing
- The Japanese Red Cross Hiroshima College of Nursing
- The Japanese Red Cross Kyushu International College of Nursing
