= Asahikawa Medical University =

National university in Asahikawa, Hokkaido, Japan

- 旭川医科大学
- Other name: AMU
- Motto: "Improvement of health and welfare in the local community"
- Type: National university
- Established: 1973
- President: Akitoshi Yoshida
- Administrative staff: 1,025
- Undergraduates: 842
- Postgraduates: 141
- Location: Asahikawa, Hokkaido, Japan; 43°43′41″N 142°23′10″E
- Campus: Urban, 0.2 km^{2} (0.077 sq mi)
- Mascot: None
- Website: www.asahikawa-med.ac.jp
- Location in Hokkaido Prefecture, Japan

Asahikawa Medical University (旭川医科大学, Asahikawa Ika Daigaku), Kyokui (旭医), or AMU, is a national university and medical school in Asahikawa, Hokkaido, Japan. Established in 1973, the university has one faculty, Faculty of Medicine, consisting of Department of Medicine and Department of Nursing. The affiliated Asahikawa Medical University Hospital was established in 1976.

== History ==
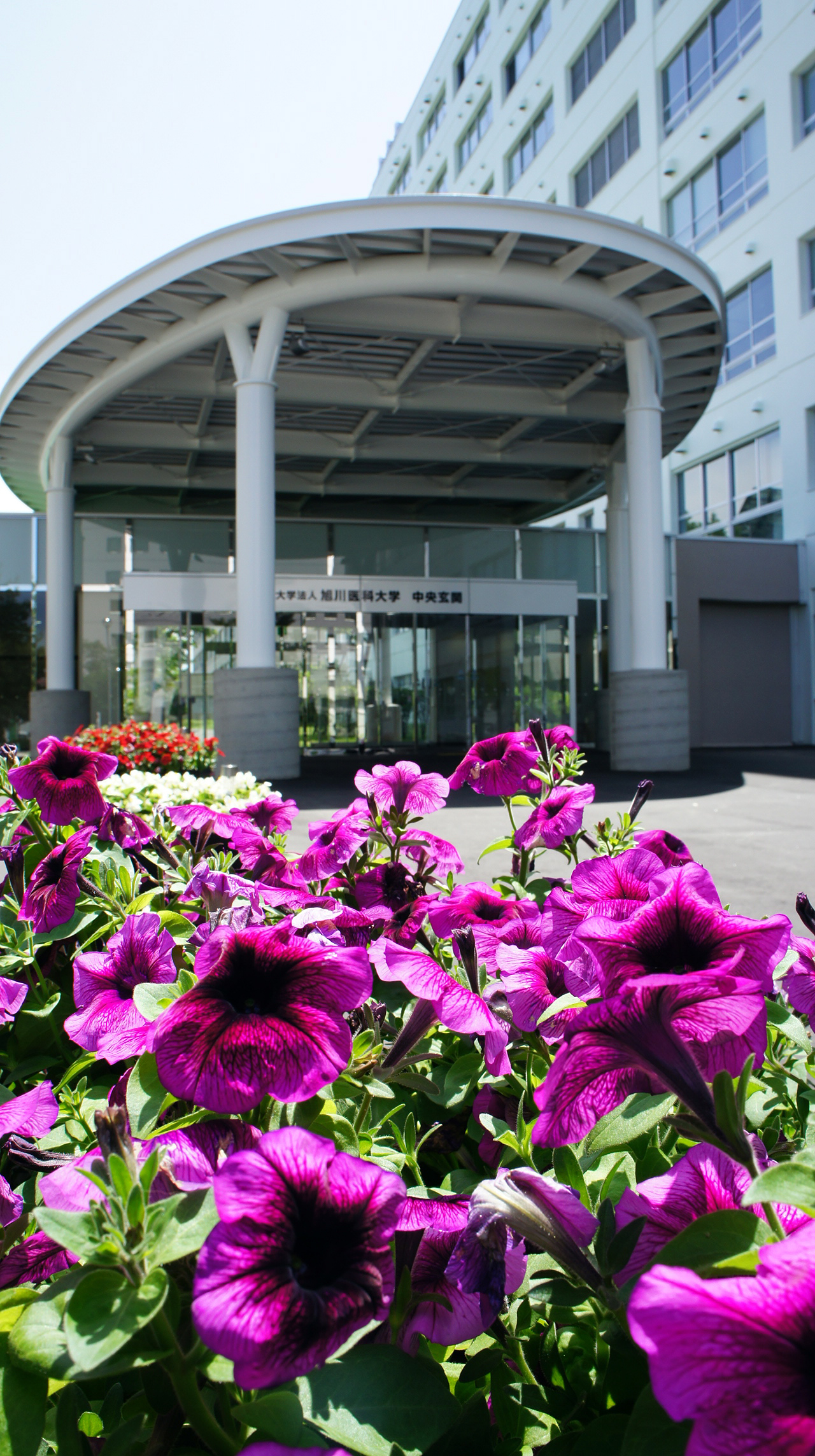
Main entrance to Asahikawa Medical University

The precursor of Asahikawa Medical University was the Karahuto Medical College (樺太医学専門学校, Karahuto Igaku Senmongakou) founded in Yuzhno-Sakhalinsk in 1943. After World War II, Karahuto Medical College was closed down because the nearby island of Sakhalin was occupied by the Union of Soviet Socialist Republics Red Army. The Asahikawa city government applied to the Supreme Commander of the Allied Powers and the Ministry of Education, Science, Sports and Culture (now the Ministry of Education, Culture, Sports, Science and Technology) for relocation of the medical college to Asahikawa, but they were rejected.

After the rejection, the Hokkaido government planned to form medical schools in both Asahikawa and Kushiro in order to address the shortage of physicians in Hokkaido. In 1973, Asahikawa Medical College (旭川医科大学) was established, with an educational philosophy of Improvement of health and welfare in the local community (地域医療) . At first, the college had only one department: Medicine. Without a campus of its own, it was located within the Hokkaido University of Education campus. AMU moved into its original campus in 1975. In 1996, the department of Nursing Science was founded and in 2010, the college was renamed to the Asahikawa Medical University. AMU has become the core medical university in Hokkaido with many physicians from AMU working in the local community.

=== Presidents ===
There were two presidents of the Karahuto Medical College. There have been seven presidents of Asahikawa Medical University, including the current president, Professor Akitoshi Yoshida, who has been in office since 2007.

==== Karahuto Medical College presidents ====
Name	From	Until
Takumi Ochi	1943	1944
Eiji Arima	1944	1946

==== Asahikawa Medical University presidents ====
Name	From	Until
Morihide Yamada	1973	1981
Kazuhide Kuroda	1981	1987
Akihisa Shimoda	1987	1991
Tetsuya Shimizu	1991	1997
Yoshihiko Kubo	1997	2003
Nao Yachiku	2003	2007
Akitoshi Yoshida	2007	present

== Campus ==
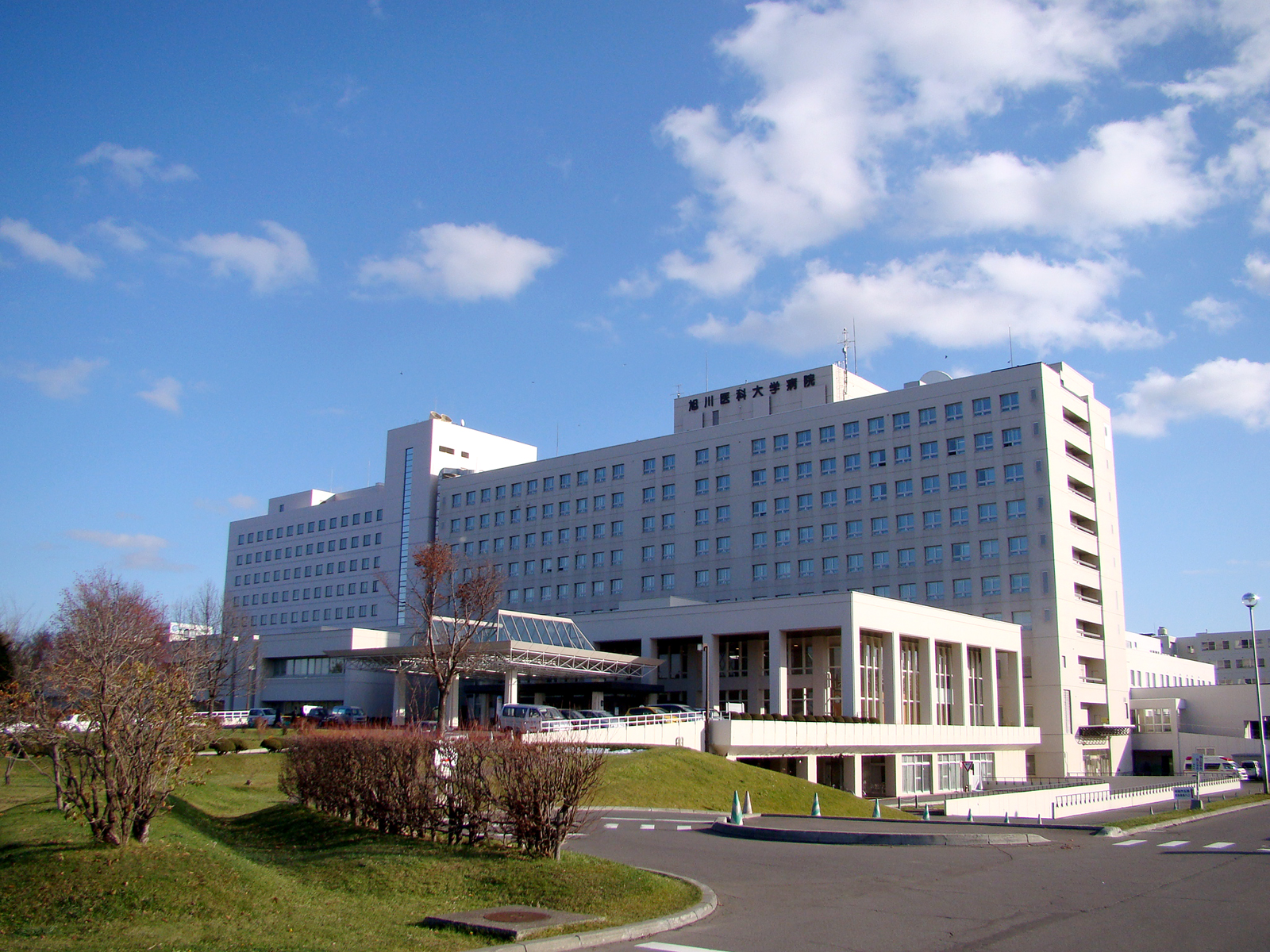
Asahikawa Medical University Hospital

The campus is located in Asahikawa. The campus is divided into four areas: lecture and practice area, clinical lecture area, laboratory area, and hospital area. Each areas are connected by a hallway enough so people travel between the areas in cold weather.

=== Asahikawa Medical University Hospital ===
The Asahikawa Medical University Hospital was founded in 1976 as a teaching hospital for AMU. It has 602 beds, and becomes one of the core hospitals in the northern and southern area in Hokkaido.

There have been eight presidents of the AMU hospital, including the current president, Professor Takeo Matsuno, who has been in office since 2007.

=== Asahikawa Medical University Library ===
The Asahikawa Medical University library was founded in 1978. It currently has about 160,000 prints of books and journals, and 10,000 digital resources. These resources include not only about medical but also about education, mathematics, and other liberal arts.

== Faculties and graduate schools ==
AMU has one faculty with two departments and six centers.

=== Departments ===
- Department of Medicine
- Department of Nursing

=== Centers ===
- Center of Education
- Center of University Health
- Center of Parental Care
- Center of Labware
- Center of Data processing
- Center of telemedicine

== Partner universities ==
AMU has partnerships with eight universities.

- (Japan) Hokkaido College of Pharmacy
- (Japan) Kitami Institute of Technology
- (Japan) Japanese Red Cross Hokkaido College of Nursing
- (China) Nanjing University of Traditional Chinese Medicine
- China Medical University
- (China) Harbin Medical University
- (Thailand) Mahidol University
- (Indonesia) Udayana University

== See also ==
- Japanese national university
- List of medical schools in Asia
