= Junior College of Toyota =

- 豊田短期大学
- Type: private
- Active: 1990–1999
- Location: Toyota, Aichi, Japan
- Colors: Green

Junior College of Toyota (豊田短期大学, Toyota Tanki Daigaku) was a private junior college in Japan. It was located in Toyota, Aichi. It was abolished in 1999.

== Departments ==
- Department of Japanese Culture
- Department of Human Relations

== Faculty and staff ==
- Tsukasa Morimoto, Assistant (1990-1999)

== See also ==
- Japanese Red Cross Toyota College of Nursing (1941)
