= Hokkai Gakuen Kitami Junior College =

- 北海学園北見短期大学
- Former names: Hokkai Gakuen Kitami Women's Junior College
- Type: Private
- Active: 1984–2004
- Academic staff: Management
- Location: Kitami, Hokkaidō, Japan; 43.7764°N 143.8742°E

Hokkai Gakuen Kitami Junior College (北海学園北見短期大学, Hokkai Gakuen Kitami Tanki Daigaku) was a junior college in Kitami, Hokkaido, Japan.

The institute was founded in 1984 as the Hokkai Gakuen Kitami Women's Junior College. In 1991, it became coeducational and changed its name to Hokkai Gakuen Kitami Junior College. It was closed in 2004.
