= Kitami =

Kitami 北見市
- City
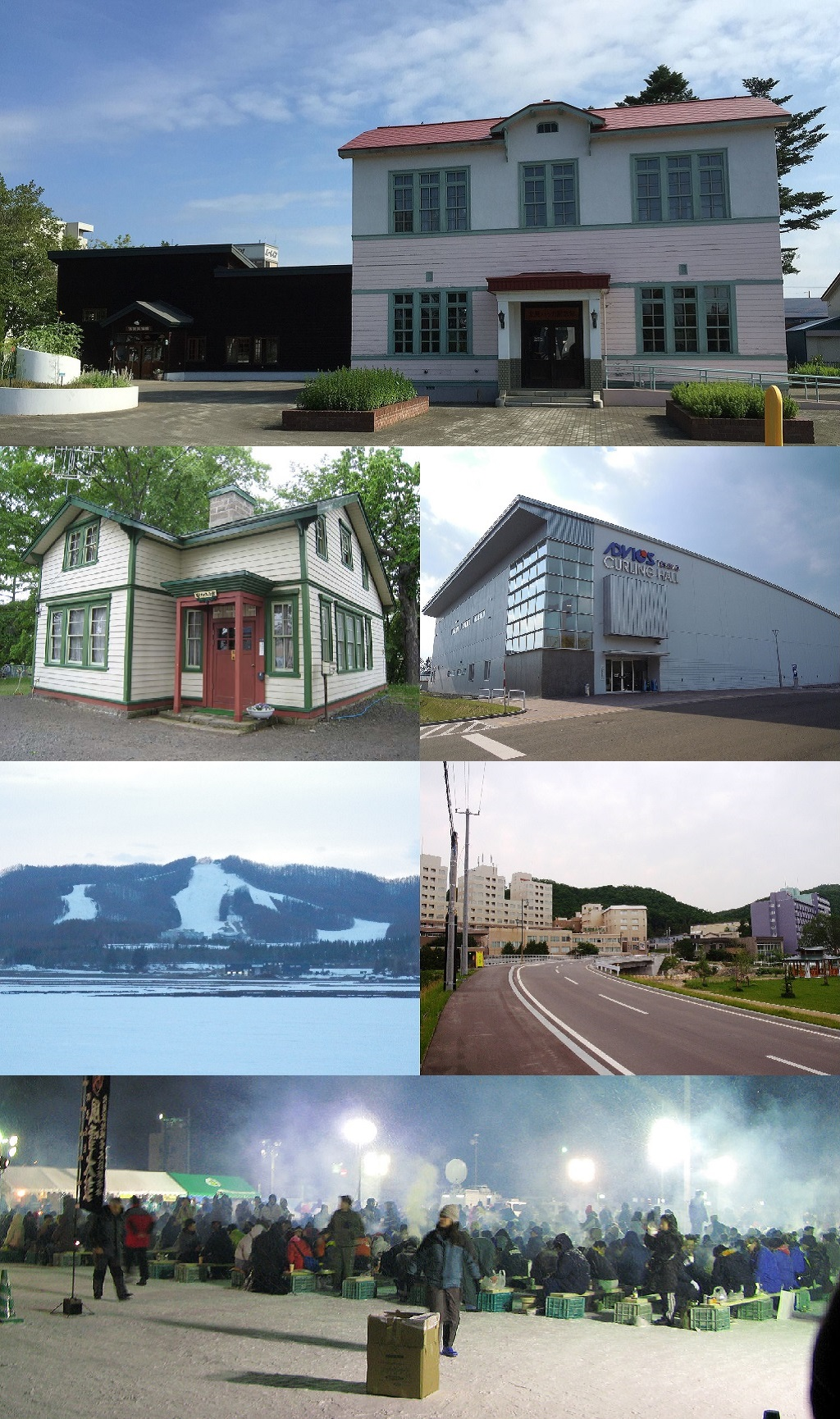
- Clockwise from top: Kitami Mint Memorial Museum, ADVICS TOKORO CURLING HALL, Street in Onneyu area, Kitami BBQ Festival in February, NORTHERN ARC RESORT, Pierson Memorial Museum

- Flag Emblem

- Location of Kitami in Hokkaido (Okhotsk Subprefecture)

- Location in Japan
- Coordinates: 43°48′11″N 143°53′41″E
- Country: Japan
- Region: Hokkaido
- Prefecture: Hokkaido (Okhotsk Subprefecture)

Government
  - Mayor: Naotaka Tsuji (from September 2015)

Area
  - Total: 1,427.41 km^{2} (551.13 sq mi)

Population (July 31, 2023)
  - Total: 112,185
  - Density: 78.5934/km^{2} (203.556/sq mi)
- Time zone: UTC+09:00 (JST)
- City hall address: 1 Higashi Ni-chōme, Kita Go-jō, Kitami-shi, Hokkaido; 090-8501
- Climate: Dfb
- Website: www.city.kitami.lg.jp
- Symbols
- Flower: Chrysanthemum
- Tree: Japanese yew

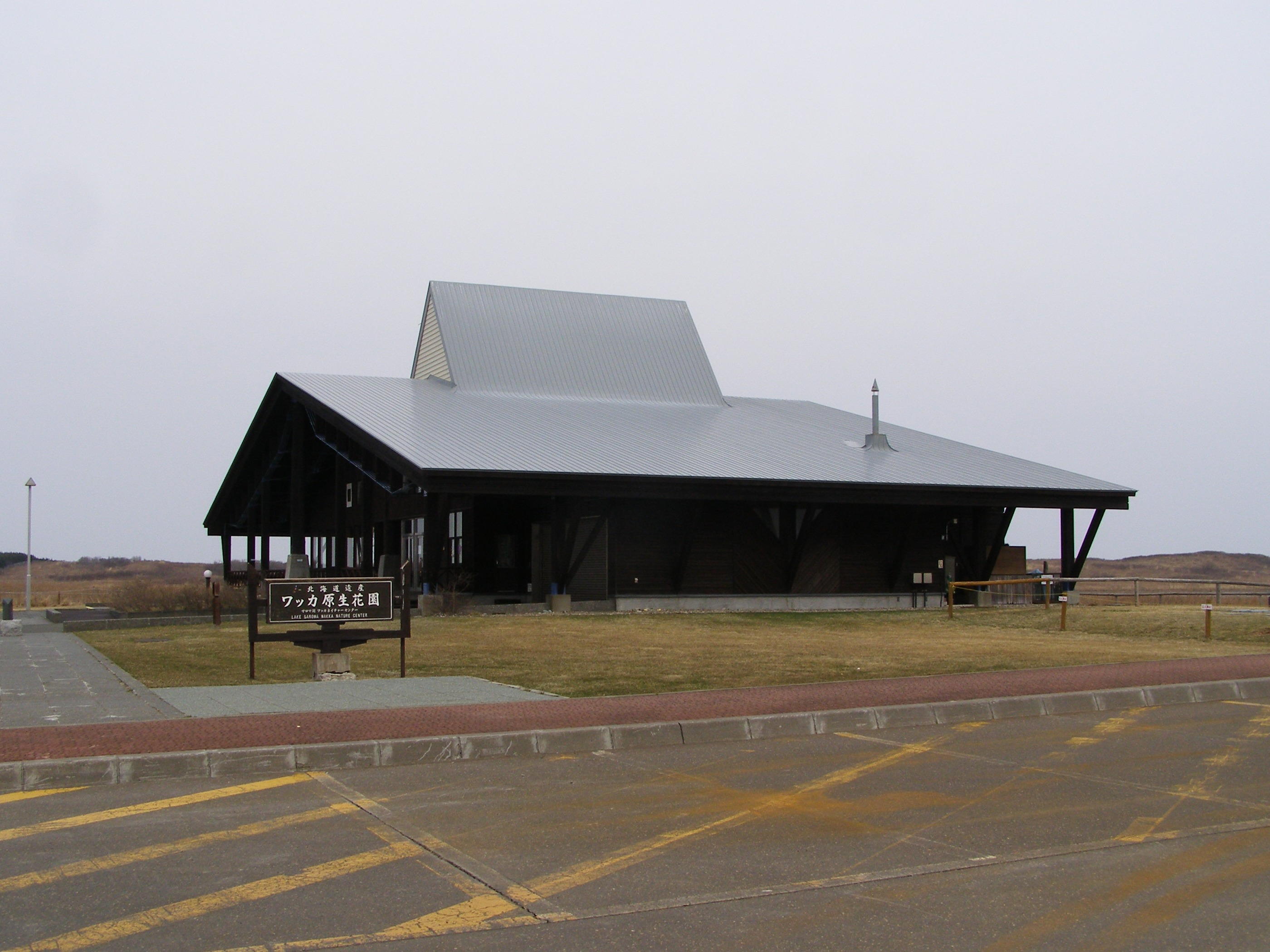
Wakka Nature Center

Kitami (北見市, Kitami-shi; Japanese pronunciation: [k̟ʲi̥.tä́.mʲì, -mʲí.ɕì]) is a city in Okhotsk Subprefecture, Hokkaido, Japan. It is the most populous city and the commercial center in the subprefecture, although the subprefecture capital is Abashiri.

Kitami is physically in the middle of Okhotsk Subprefecture. The Kitami Mountains are nearby and are the main reason behind the city's name. The city is the result of the merger of Kitami, Tanno, Tokoro and Rubeshibe towns in 2006 administrative reform. Kitami developed mainly in commerce and industry/service industries, Tanno in agriculture, Tokoro in fishery and agriculture, and Rubeshibe in forestry and tourism on hot springs.

Due to the characteristics of the region, Kitami has the highest onion and white flower bean production in Japan. Scallop fishing also flourishes, which makes it the "birthplace of scallop farming" in the country. In addition, the region is home to historical and tourist places like the Pearson Museum, Wakka Wild Flower Garden, and Tokoro Ruins, which are listed as "Hokkaido Heritage" sites.

As of July 31, 2023, the city had a population of 112,185, citizens in 61,793 households. The population density is 78.6 inhabitants per square kilometre (204/sq mi) . The total area is 1,427.41 km^{2} (551.13 sq mi).

== Etymology ==
The name came as a suggestion of the Japanese explorer and cartographer Matsuura Takeshirō during the Meiji era, when imperial bureaucrats were registering the place for initiating the region's development through the Hokkaidō Development Commission. Before the imperial intervention, there was no Ainu name for the region.

The meaning of the name consists of the kanji's combinations of characters 北 (North) 見 (See) and 市 (City), which means "City of the North View". The reason behind this meaning is due to the region's mountains, which allow the view of the sea and the Russian island of Sakhalin.

Originally, the name refers to a vast area between the mountains and the Sea of Okhotsk. Since the merger of Kitami City with the surrounding Tokoro, Rubeshibe and Tanno towns in 2006, it is often referred to as the area around the Kitami Basin, the so-called Kitami Inland Area, excluding the former Tokoro Town area in the coastal area.

== Chronology ==
=== The Edo period ===
The Edo period is the period between 1603 and 1867 in the history of Japan, when Japan was under the rule of the Tokugawa shogunate and the country's 300 regional daimyo. During this period, there is no registration of continuous human settlement in this place. The nearest populations were composed of Ainu Tribes. Nowadays, one of their old settlements has become the Tokoro Ruins. The history began to appear in the final years of the Edo period, as a result of the Meiji Restoration and the Boshin War.

- 1856: Japanese explorer Matsuura Takeshirō passed over the region for the first time on the Tokoro River.

=== Meiji era ===
The Meiji era is an era of Japanese history that extended from October 23, 1868, to July 30, 1912. In this period, the Boshin War was over and the short-lived Ezo Republic was conquered by the Japanese Imperial Army. Due to the risk of having new revolts in the border of the empire and the constant expansion of the Russian Empire at the north, the imperial bureau started the mass colonisation of the region and the "Japanization" of the natives through forced assimilation and segregation.

- 1869 (Meiji 2): The Meiji government renames Ezo as "Hokkaido" and creates the Hokkaidō Development Commission.
- 1872 (Meiji 5): The village of Notsukeushi-mura (ノツケウシ村) is founded, starting the process of settle in the region.
- 1882 (Meiji 15): Hokkaidō Development Commission is abolished, and the first three prefectures are established in Hokkaido. This area belonged to Nemuro prefecture, one of those firstly created.
- 1897 (Meiji 30): 112 immigrants arrives and settle, which led to the substantial growth of the region.
- 1899 (Meiji 32): Is produced the first mint in the region.
- 1904 (Meiji 37): Rice cultivation begins.
- 1910 (Meiji 43): Train service arrives (then called the Ikeda Railway Line), connecting the village to Sapporo, capital of Hokkaido.

=== Taishō era ===
The Taishō era is a period dating from 30 July 1912 to 25 December 1926, coinciding with the reign of the Emperor Taishō. During this Era, the emperor wasn't capable of using his power due to cerebral meningitis contracted in his childhood. Because of his personal limitations, the imperial government was led informally by an oligarchy of notables called Genrō (元老). Thanks to this power vacuum, Japan developed a political system that allowed a liberal government, with the creation of political parties and a major role of the National Diet.

- 1914 (Taisho 3): Pearson Museum is opened in the old house of the Pearsons, an American missionary couple.
- 1915 (Taisho 4): Tokoro Village is created.
- 1921 (Taisho 10): Rubeshibe Town is created.

=== Showa Era ===
This chapter of Japanese history corresponds to the reign of Emperor Shōwa (Hirohito) from December 25, 1926, until his death on January 7, 1989. This time represents the most intense changes in Kitami, Hokkaido, and Japan. In the beginning, the city started to specialise in the production of Mint, meanwhile, the Empire of Japan was under a militaristic rule with expansionist actions that led to the participation of the country in the Second World War.

After the end of the conflict, Japan started to concentrate its economic efforts on mass industrialisation, which, in consequence, led Japan to the second most important economy in the world. Kitami had an industrial development during this progress and the city reached its highest population in the middle of the 80s.

- 1928 (Showa 3): Mr. and Mrs. Pearson leave Kitami and come back to the United States.
- 1934 (Showa 9): The Japanese Red Cross hospital is completed.
- 1934 (Showa 9): Kitami's Mint Memorial Hall is opened.
- 1939 (Showa 14): Kitami's mint production gets 70% of the world market and reaches its peak.
- 1942 (Showa 17): Kitami becomes a city.
- 1947 (Showa 22): 50th anniversary of the creation of Kitami City. Enactment of the Kitami City coat of arms.
- 1954 (Showa 29): "Kitami Commerce and Industry Festival" is held for the first time
- 1960 (Showa 35): Establishment of the Kitami College of Technology.
- 1971 (Showa 46): "Kitami Winter Festival" held for the first time.
- 1979 (Showa 54): The population of Kitami City exceeds 100,000.
- 1983 (Showa 58): The 100th anniversary of the creation of Tokoro.
- 1984 (Showa 59): Kitami Cultural Center in the Kitami area opens.
- 1988 (Showa 63): Tokorocho Curling Hall (currently Tokorocho Curling Hall, Kitami City ) was completed.

=== Heisei Era ===
Is the period corresponding to the reign of Emperor Akihito from 8 January 1989 until his abdication on 30 April 2019. Heisei's era was marked by turbulent politics and a prolonged economic slowdown. Since the economic downturn, Kitami never recovered its economic dimensions since the burst of the Japanese financial crisis and its population started to slowly decrease until nowadays. In this era, the actual city administrative divisions were created.

- 1991 (Heisei 3): "Solar Challenge in Hokkaido" (solar car race) held for the first time (ended in 2003).
- 1996 (Heisei 8): Marks the 100th anniversary of the creation of Kitami.
- 1997 (Heisei 9): The "Kaoryanse Festival" is held for the first time.
- 1999 (Heisei 11): Hokkaido's Japanese Red Cross College of Nursing is opened in the city.
- 2000 (Heisei 12): "Kitami Severe Cold Yakiniku Festival" was held for the first time.
- 2001 (Heisei 13): The Pearson Museum and Wakka Wild Flower Garden are selected as "Hokkaido Heritage".
- 2004 (Heisei 16): A record blizzard hits (snow cover 171 centimetres (67 in). Ancient archaeological sites along the Okhotsk coast including the Tokoro archaeological site are selected as "Hokkaido heritage".
- 2006 (Heisei 18): Kitami, Tokoro, Rubeshibe and Tanno surges as City of Kitami.
- 2008 (Heisei 20): The first community broadcast "FM Okhotsk" opens.
- 2009 (Heisei 21): "Kitami Half Marathon" held for the first time.
- 2014 (Heisei 26): Kitami's daily maximum temperature recorded the highest value until 2019 (37.2 °C).

=== Reiwa Era ===
Reiwa is the current era of Japan's official calendar. It began on 1 May 2019, the day on which Emperor Akihito's elder son, Naruhito, ascended the throne as the 126th Emperor of Japan.

- 2019 (first year of Reiwa): On May 26, the highest temperature in the history of observation was observed in Kitami City at 38.1 °C, beating the 2014 record.

== Towns and autonomous regions ==
Kitami is the result of the administrative unification of small towns with the main city, which was made in 2006. Thanks to this merging, Kitami is the biggest city in the Okhotsk Subprefecture. These small towns still exist as Autonomous Region Districts (自治区). There are four autonomous regions/towns in total.

=== City of Kitami ===
Translated as North View (北見), it is the main urban area of the region. The city flourished during the prewar era through the production of mint, which at the time accounted for 70% of world production. Nowadays Kitami is the commercial, industrial, and service center of the Okhotsk area. The government makes efforts to develop the city through an industry-academia-government collaboration involving universities and other higher education institutions that are also based in the area.

=== Town of Tanno ===
Translated as Edge Field (端野) which is based in the native Ainu name nufu-un-keshi (edge of the field), the district is mainly a farm field with smooth hills and a rural landscape in the Tokoro river basin. The district has an educational zone with elementary and junior high schools, social education facilities, and parks in the main centre of the district. The rural landscape is also shaped by farms with urban convenience. In the last population survey (2005) the town had an estimated population of 5,425 and a density of 33 persons per km^{2}. The total area was 163.50 km^{2}.

=== Town of Tokoro ===
Agriculture and fisheries thrive in this district with abundant nature, including Wakka Wild Flower Park, where flowers stand out on the sandbar between the Sea of Okhotsk and Lake Saroma. It has a year-round curling hall, which is one of the largest of its kind in Japan, as well as historical sites such as the Tokoro Site and the birthplace of scallop cultivation. As of 2004, the town had an estimated population of 4,885 and a density of 17.55 persons per km^{2}. The total area was 278.29 km^{2}.

=== Town of Rubeshibe ===
Translated as Legacy of the Detained Pistils (留辺蘂), the district is surrounded by thick forests at the foot of the Taisetsu mountains and along the Muka River. Its key industries are White Flower (shirohana-mame) beans production, for which it boasts the nation's largest yield, and the forest products industry, which uses locally produced wood. As a tourist spot, Yama no Aquarium (Kita no Daichi no Aquarium) in the Onneyu Onsen resort is attracting nationwide attention with its unique display tanks. Before the unification with Kitami, the town had an estimated population of 8,704 and a density of 15.41 persons per km^{2}. The total area was 564.69 km^{2}.

== Economy ==
=== History and actual situation ===
Kitami's first economy was the natural production of Mentha (Mint). At one time (pre-war) the region exported mint (known as hakka locally) on a scale that represented the supply of 70% of the world's mint consumption at its peak. Nowadays it is the most important city of the Okhotsk region. Due to its size, Kitami is the main industrial and commercial pole of the region. The number of employees by industry is divided by 7.6% for the primary industry, 18.8% for the secondary industry, and 73.6% for the tertiary industry (2010). These economic proportions are comparable to major cities in Hokkaido but, in terms of primary industry, the percentage is higher when compared with other cities alike.

=== Agriculture ===
The extensive farmlands of the city are surrounded by nature that stretches over 110 km from the foot of the Taisetsu mountains to the Sea of Okhotsk coast. Fertile soil supports the production of diverse produce, including rice, wheat/barley, potatoes, beet, beans and other upland crops, onions and other vegetables, as well as dairy products, beef, pork and other livestock products.Efforts are being made to produce diverse farm products by making the most of the climate and characteristics of each district. Chemical fertilisers and synthetic fertilisers are minimally used.

The total production of onions in FY 2019 was approximately 221,000 tons, accounting for roughly 25% of the total production of Hokkaido as well as being the largest yield in Japan. The total area of onion fields in the city is approximately 3,500 hectares. Farmers transplant seedlings in spring, and rows of large onions fill fields in autumn.

White pea beans are known as the "queen of beans". These pure white, large-grained beans are used as an ingredient for the white bean paste in upmarket Japanese confectionery. Kitami's cool, inland climate is conducive for cultivating white pea beans and is a major production area in Hokkaido. The large white pea beans produced in Kitami are distributed as high-grade beans throughout Japan.

=== Fishery ===
In Kitami, which faces the resource-rich Sea of Okhotsk and Lake Saroma, open-sea scallop and fixed-net salmon/trout fisheries are among the city's key industries. Hairy crabs, sea urchin and flatfish are also caught. Scallop and oyster farming and Hokkai shrimp fishing are popular on the lake. The Tokoro Fishing Port is being developed. With an eye on the conservation of the fishing ground environment, fishing operators are actively engaged in tree planting activities to grow forests.

- Scallops

The lake Saroma is the birthplace of scallop farming. After many hardships, fishermen established propagation and culture technology to build the foundation of the Tokoro area as one of the world's leading scallop producing areas. The scallops grown in Lake Saroma and the Sea of Okhotsk are plump and sweet, and have an exceptional texture. They are distributed all over the world as a luxury food item.

- Oysters and Hokkai shrimp

From mid-October to the end of March, oyster fishing is popular on Lake Saroma. The oysters, which are small yet have a rich flavor, are highly valued especially for eating raw. Hokkai shrimp, which is shipped only in July and August, is mainly boiled in salt. With a saltiness that pairs perfectly with sake, moderate elasticity, crispy texture, and sweetness that spreads in the mouth, it is known as a summer specialty of the Okhotsk area.

=== Industry ===
Efforts to revitalise the local economy include the "cultivation" of new sales channels and the development of new products with higher added value to overcome the problem of logistics costs. Product development is promoted via inter-industry collaboration and by attracting enterprises to the Kitami Industrial Complex and Kitami HighTech Park, both of which make the most of local resources. Kitami Institute of Technology's Cooperative Research & Community Collaboration Center serves as a contact point for joint research with the private sector. The Okhotsk Collaborative Research Center and the Kitami Office of the Hokkaido Branch of the Organization for Small & Medium Enterprises and Regional Innovation have been established as "one-stop service bases" to support R&D and commercialization in the local community. Measures to promote local industries, such as the enhancement of technological capabilities and the development of new products, are taken while strengthening industry-academia-government collaboration. There is important private enterprises installed in the city like Kyocera Corporation and Hitachi, Ltd.

=== Commerce ===
As the central city of the Okhotsk area, Kitami has expanded its retail trading zone in the last years. The commercial district in the downtown area, where retail, service and restaurant establishments are concentrated, has long been a place for interaction among citizens. Various events are held to make the commercial district more attractive. A new shopping zone formed in the suburbs has further livened up the commercial sector of Kitami. Lively and diverse commercial activities are promoted by making the most of local creativity while facilitating the participation of local residents in the development of a community. In financial matters, the annual sales of both wholesale and retail businesses in Kitami City are declining, and the number of business establishments and employees is also declining. This decline occur mainly due the Japanese economic crisis, faster ageing population and urban exodus. In the tourism industry, there are about 1.5 million tourists a year, mainly in Lake Saroma and Onneyu Onsen. However, the total number of overnight guests has been around 450,000 a year, making it a so-called “passing-type” tourist destination.

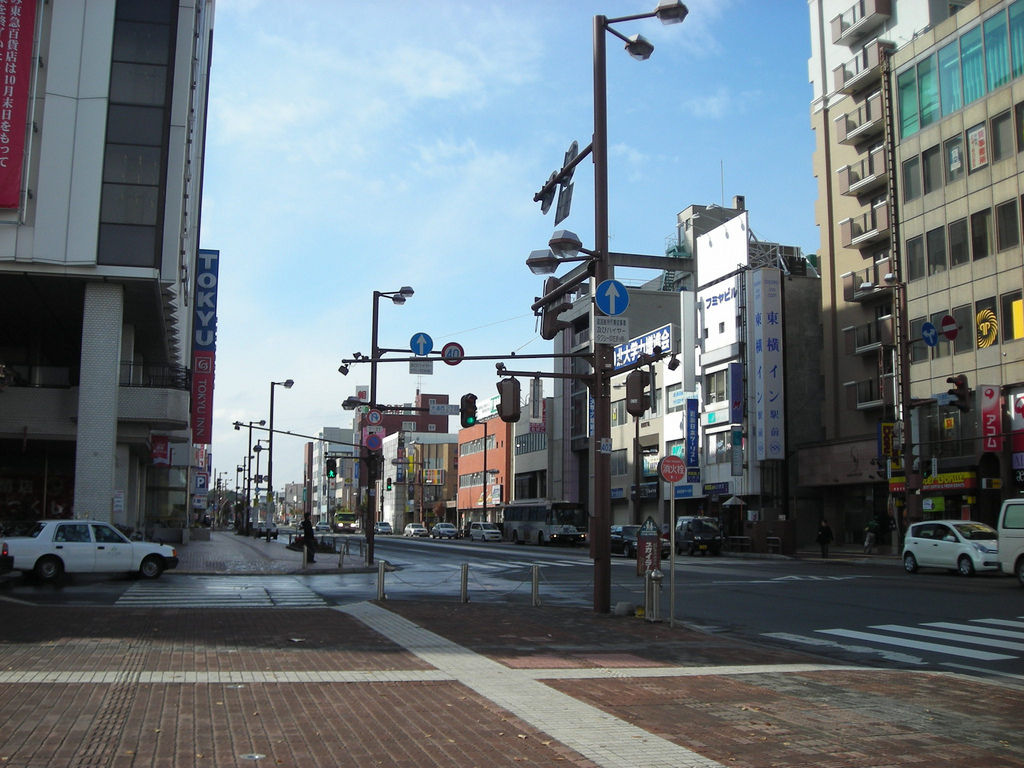
Downtown of the City

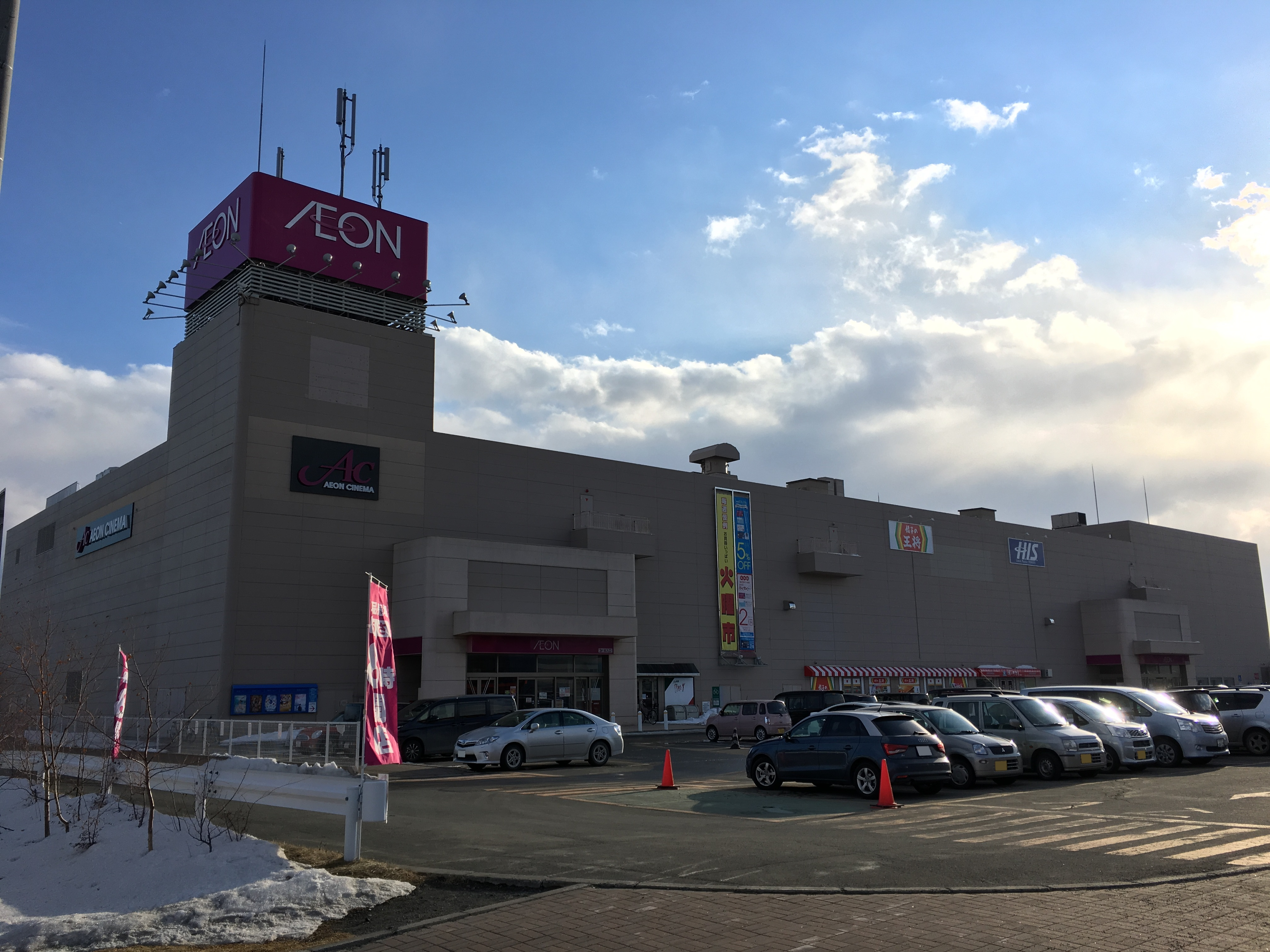
An Aeon's retail store in Kitami

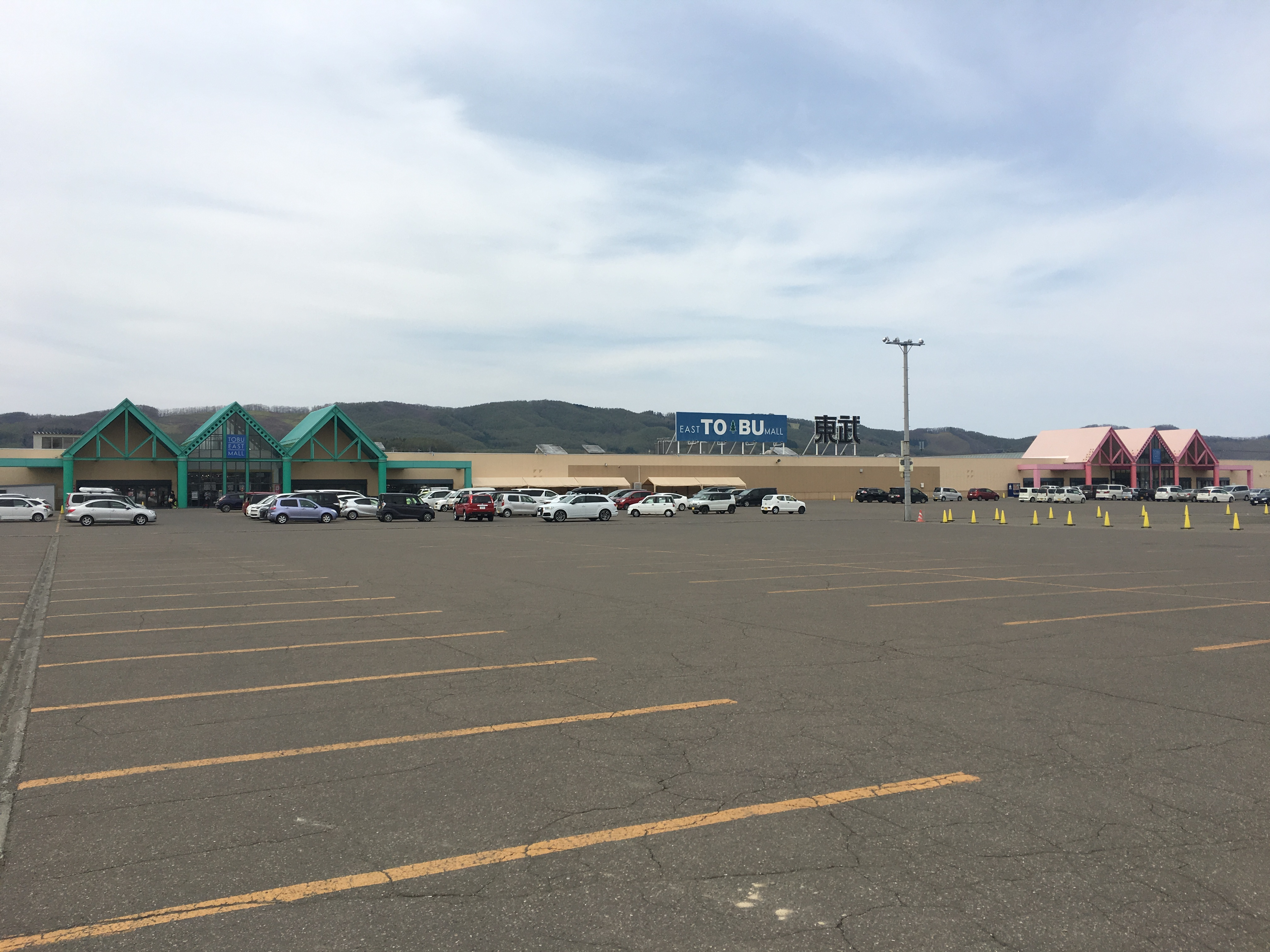
Tobu East Mall, one of the largest in the region.

== Education ==
Kitami is home to the Kitami Institute of Technology, an engineering university that originally opened in 1960, and the Japanese Red Cross Hokkaido College of Nursing, established in 1999 by the Japanese Red Cross through consolidation of several other institutions. The Kitami Central Library is the main library of the city. In December 2015, the library was relocated to a new building on the south side, making it easily accessible from the downtown area. The library has a collection of approximately 330,000 books and supports the learning of residents with a network of nine facilities in the city, which have 799,000 books in total. It provides an audiovisual area where DVDs and music can be enjoyed and a literature museum area that exhibits valuable materials of the poet Mokichi Saito. PCs and Wi-Fi can be used freely by residents and non-residents alike. New services such as e-books are also available.

=== Universities ===
==== National ====
- Kitami Institute of Technology

==== Private ====
- Japanese Red Cross Hokkaido College of Nursing

=== High schools ===
==== Public ====
- Hokkaido Kitami Commercial High School
- Hokkaido Kitami Hakuyou High School
- Hokkaido Kitami Hokuto High School
- Hokkaido Kitami Ryokuryo High School
- Hokkaido Kitami Technical High School
- Hokkaido Rubeshibe High School
- Hokkaido Tokoro High School

==== Private ====
- Kitami Fuji High School (formally Kitami Fuji Girl's High School)

== Festivals ==
- The Kitami Winter Festival, held annually during the 2nd week of February.
- The Kitami Bonchi Festival (Summer Festival) in early July.
- The Kitami Chrysanthemum festival in mid October−early November.

== Mascots ==
Mint-kun, Pepper-chan, Nonta-kun, Nonta-chan, Matsubo, Tokoro-kun and Ecolon, the city's mascots

Kitami's mascots are Mint-kun (ミントくん), Pepper-chan (ペッパーちゃん), Nonta-kun (のんたくん), Nonta-chan (のんこちゃん), Matsubo (まつぼう), Tokoro-kun (ところくん) and Ecolon (エコロン).

- Mint-kun and Pepper-chan are married squirrels. They ate so much food that they are rounded. Mint-kun likes to hack things (he once ‘boosted 70% of the world market’) while Pepper-chan likes fresh air. They represent technology and cuisine.
- Nonta-kun and Nonta-chan are farmers from Tanno. They wear red hat with wheat ears. Their faces resembles onions and their shoes resemble rice. They represent agriculture.
- Matsubo is a pinecone from Rubeshibe. He loves shopping. His 'charming points' are his scales and his eyes. He represents tourism.
- Tokoro-kun is a sporty scallop from Tokoro. He represents sports and fisheries.
- Ecolon is a seed (which resembled the recycling symbol) with wings. Her hair (seedling) can spin like Doraemon's take-copter. When she flies by, everything turns green. She represents the environment.

== Mass media ==
=== Newspapers ===
- Asahi Shimbun—Hokkaido's Kitami Branch
- Hokkaido Construction Newspaper—Kitami Branch
- Hokkaido Shimbun—Kitami Branch
- Mainichi Shimbun—Hokkaido's Kitami Communication Department
- Yomiuri Shimbun—Hokkaido's Kitami Branch

=== Tabloids ===
- Densho Hato Kitami Headquarters, Rubeshibe Office
- Doshin information magazine Mint
- Gra Style

=== Broadcasting stations ===
==== TV ====
- Hokkaido Broadcasting (HBC) Kitami Broadcasting Station
- NHK Kitami Broadcasting Station
- Sapporo Television Broadcasting (STV) Kitami Broadcasting Station

==== Radio ====
- FM Okhotsk

== Sports ==
=== Curling ===
The city has strong associations with the sport of curling, inherited from the former town of Tokoro, which was absorbed into the city in 2006. Interest in the sport grew following a friendship visit in 1980 by a curling team from Alberta in Canada. An outdoor curling rink was built in Tokoro the following year, and it hosted the 1st NHK Cup Curling Championship. In January 1988, the town built a dedicated 5-lane curling hall, the first in Japan. This eventually closed in early 2013, replaced by a new, larger, all-year-round structure.

Curling was introduced in schools in Tokoro as part of the physical education curriculum, and the two produced a number of Olympic curlers. Five members of the Japanese curling team at the 1998 Winter Olympics in Nagano were from Tokoro, three members of the Japanese curling team at the 2006 Winter Olympics in Torino were from Tokoro, and three members of the Japanese curling team at the 2010 Winter Olympics in Vancouver were from Tokoro.

== Geography ==
Kitami City is located in a mild valley close to the Kitami Mountains. This Mountains, especially the Mount Mikuni, is where the headwaters of the Tokoro River are located. The river belongs to in-Mukagawa basin, which leads to the Sea of Okhotsk. This course has more than 110 km of extension. Tokoro Autonomous Region district has its limits based in the course of the basin. Besides of the Sea of Okhotsk and Lake Saroma, there is the Abashiri Quasi-National Park, where is located the Wakka Natural Flower Garden. The park is listed as a Hokkaido heritage site.

=== Features ===
==== Terrain and mountains ====
- Mt. Mukayama (1,759 m)
- Mt. Mikuni (1,541 m)
- Kitami Fuji (1,291 m)
- Nikoroyama (829 m)

==== Rivers ====
- Komachigawa
- Kunneppu River
- Mukagawa
- Nikoro River
- Tokoro River

==== Lakes ====
- Lake Saroma
- Lake Tomisato

=== Vegetation ===
- Mainly Wakka primitive flower

== Climate ==
Kitami has a humid continental climate with cold winters and relatively warm summers. The coldest month is January, with an average low of −14.7 °C (5.5 °F), and the warmest month is August, with an average high of 25 °C (77 °F). Kitami's inland location creates a larger temperature range than some coastal cities. Due to the mountains nearby, the Foehn wind effect occurs in summer when prevailing winds are from the southeast, so that Kitami often has the hottest temperatures in Hokkaido during this season and averages about 5 °C (9 °F) hotter than Kushiro. Traces of snow fall every day during the winter and cover is heavy, usually peaking at 0.82 metres (32.28 in), though Kitami still receives less overall precipitation than any other town in Japan as it is shielded from the heaviest moisture from both the Sea of Japan and Pacific Ocean. University of Tokyo's snow monitoring system is located in the city, which main coverage consist in the area of eastern Hokkaido.

Climate data for Kitami (elevation 104 m, 1991–2020 normals, extremes 1976–present)
Month	Jan	Feb	Mar	Apr	May	Jun	Jul	Aug	Sep	Oct	Nov	Dec	Year
Record high °C (°F)	8.0 (46.4)	13.4 (56.1)	17.1 (62.8)	32.2 (90.0)	38.1 (100.6)	37.2 (99.0)	39.0 (102.2)	37.1 (98.8)	32.7 (90.9)	30.3 (86.5)	22.0 (71.6)	14.5 (58.1)	39.0 (102.2)
Mean daily maximum °C (°F)	−2.6 (27.3)	−1.6 (29.1)	3.3 (37.9)	11.1 (52.0)	17.8 (64.0)	21.3 (70.3)	24.6 (76.3)	25.4 (77.7)	21.7 (71.1)	15.5 (59.9)	7.6 (45.7)	0.0 (32.0)	12.0 (53.6)
Daily mean °C (°F)	−8.0 (17.6)	−7.4 (18.7)	−1.9 (28.6)	5.1 (41.2)	11.2 (52.2)	15.4 (59.7)	19.1 (66.4)	20.2 (68.4)	16.2 (61.2)	9.5 (49.1)	2.4 (36.3)	−5.1 (22.8)	6.4 (43.5)
Mean daily minimum °C (°F)	−14.2 (6.4)	−14 (7)	−7.6 (18.3)	−0.6 (30.9)	5.2 (41.4)	10.3 (50.5)	14.7 (58.5)	15.9 (60.6)	11.3 (52.3)	3.9 (39.0)	−2.6 (27.3)	−10.8 (12.6)	1.0 (33.8)
Record low °C (°F)	−30.1 (−22.2)	−30.9 (−23.6)	−24.3 (−11.7)	−14 (7)	−4.8 (23.4)	−0.9 (30.4)	3.4 (38.1)	6.3 (43.3)	0.3 (32.5)	−5.7 (21.7)	−16.3 (2.7)	−24.6 (−12.3)	−30.9 (−23.6)
Average precipitation mm (inches)	39.3 (1.55)	29.0 (1.14)	35.1 (1.38)	45.0 (1.77)	56.2 (2.21)	66.2 (2.61)	94.5 (3.72)	128.9 (5.07)	111.8 (4.40)	77.2 (3.04)	40.3 (1.59)	51.3 (2.02)	774.8 (30.50)
Average snowfall cm (inches)	109 (43)	85 (33)	81 (32)	26 (10)	1 (0.4)	0 (0)	0 (0)	0 (0)	0 (0)	0 (0)	16 (6.3)	92 (36)	414 (163)
Average precipitation days (≥ 1.0 mm)	8.5	7.4	8.9	8.9	9.2	9.0	10.0	10.3	10.4	8.8	7.9	9.1	108.3
Mean monthly sunshine hours	106.1	119.5	157.6	165.5	174.9	157.2	153.4	148.5	148.0	153.8	126.8	112.9	1,724.3
Source: Japan Meteorological Agency (1991–2020 normals, extremes 1976–present)

Climate data for Tokoro, Kitami (elevation 3 m, 1991–2020 normals, extremes 1977–present)
Month	Jan	Feb	Mar	Apr	May	Jun	Jul	Aug	Sep	Oct	Nov	Dec	Year
Record high °C (°F)	7.8 (46.0)	12.4 (54.3)	16.6 (61.9)	30.8 (87.4)	35.2 (95.4)	32.7 (90.9)	36.7 (98.1)	36.9 (98.4)	32.6 (90.7)	31.4 (88.5)	20.9 (69.6)	16.4 (61.5)	36.9 (98.4)
Mean daily maximum °C (°F)	−2.4 (27.7)	−2.3 (27.9)	1.9 (35.4)	9.2 (48.6)	15.2 (59.4)	18.5 (65.3)	22.3 (72.1)	24.1 (75.4)	21.1 (70.0)	15.1 (59.2)	7.5 (45.5)	0.4 (32.7)	10.9 (51.6)
Daily mean °C (°F)	−6.5 (20.3)	−6.9 (19.6)	−2.2 (28.0)	4.3 (39.7)	9.9 (49.8)	13.6 (56.5)	17.7 (63.9)	19.6 (67.3)	16.3 (61.3)	10.1 (50.2)	3.3 (37.9)	−3.4 (25.9)	6.3 (43.3)
Mean daily minimum °C (°F)	−12.2 (10.0)	−13.6 (7.5)	−7.4 (18.7)	−0.5 (31.1)	4.8 (40.6)	9.3 (48.7)	13.8 (56.8)	15.7 (60.3)	11.6 (52.9)	4.9 (40.8)	−1 (30)	−8.5 (16.7)	1.4 (34.5)
Record low °C (°F)	−29.6 (−21.3)	−31.2 (−24.2)	−26.8 (−16.2)	−14.7 (5.5)	−3.5 (25.7)	−1.3 (29.7)	3.8 (38.8)	5.7 (42.3)	1.4 (34.5)	−3.6 (25.5)	−15.3 (4.5)	−24.2 (−11.6)	−31.2 (−24.2)
Average precipitation mm (inches)	30.3 (1.19)	19.6 (0.77)	22.0 (0.87)	35.7 (1.41)	54.8 (2.16)	65.0 (2.56)	91.0 (3.58)	112.0 (4.41)	111.2 (4.38)	76.5 (3.01)	50.6 (1.99)	42.2 (1.66)	710.6 (27.98)
Average precipitation days (≥ 1.0 mm)	10.1	7.6	7.3	8.1	10.0	9.8	10.6	11.3	11.4	10.6	10.3	10.3	117.2
Mean monthly sunshine hours	98.2	124.6	171.7	181.9	185.5	170.7	166.7	170.4	167.4	152.8	116.6	99.3	1,805.9
Source: Japan Meteorological Agency (1991–2020 normals, extremes 1977–present)

Climate data for Rubeshibe, Kitami (elevation 325 m, 1991–2020 normals, extremes 1978–present)
Month	Jan	Feb	Mar	Apr	May	Jun	Jul	Aug	Sep	Oct	Nov	Dec	Year
Record high °C (°F)	6.4 (43.5)	14.2 (57.6)	16.5 (61.7)	28.7 (83.7)	36.4 (97.5)	36.2 (97.2)	37.6 (99.7)	35.0 (95.0)	31.5 (88.7)	29.0 (84.2)	21.1 (70.0)	13.4 (56.1)	37.6 (99.7)
Mean daily maximum °C (°F)	−4.1 (24.6)	−3 (27)	1.8 (35.2)	9.7 (49.5)	17.0 (62.6)	20.8 (69.4)	24.1 (75.4)	24.5 (76.1)	20.6 (69.1)	14.1 (57.4)	5.9 (42.6)	−1.6 (29.1)	10.8 (51.4)
Daily mean °C (°F)	−9.2 (15.4)	−8.7 (16.3)	−3.6 (25.5)	3.7 (38.7)	10.3 (50.5)	14.5 (58.1)	18.3 (64.9)	18.9 (66.0)	14.6 (58.3)	7.9 (46.2)	0.8 (33.4)	−6.5 (20.3)	5.1 (41.2)
Mean daily minimum °C (°F)	−15 (5)	−15.2 (4.6)	−9.7 (14.5)	−2 (28)	3.8 (38.8)	8.9 (48.0)	13.3 (55.9)	14.1 (57.4)	9.3 (48.7)	2.4 (36.3)	−4 (25)	−11.8 (10.8)	−0.5 (31.1)
Record low °C (°F)	−28.7 (−19.7)	−26.9 (−16.4)	−25.4 (−13.7)	−16.4 (2.5)	−5.3 (22.5)	−2 (28)	3.5 (38.3)	4.2 (39.6)	−0.8 (30.6)	−6.3 (20.7)	−16.3 (2.7)	−22.1 (−7.8)	−28.7 (−19.7)
Average precipitation mm (inches)	30.0 (1.18)	22.3 (0.88)	31.6 (1.24)	41.2 (1.62)	54.5 (2.15)	68.2 (2.69)	101.4 (3.99)	131.6 (5.18)	113.9 (4.48)	69.8 (2.75)	44.0 (1.73)	41.0 (1.61)	749.6 (29.51)
Average snowfall cm (inches)	130 (51)	105 (41)	99 (39)	31 (12)	1 (0.4)	0 (0)	0 (0)	0 (0)	0 (0)	1 (0.4)	28 (11)	110 (43)	507 (200)
Average precipitation days (≥ 1.0 mm)	7.8	6.7	8.6	8.7	8.9	9.9	10.4	11.0	10.3	8.7	9.0	8.2	108.3
Mean monthly sunshine hours	114.7	117.2	151.8	166.5	173.6	152.3	146.2	137.9	142.1	153.4	124.8	117.7	1,698.1
Source: Japan Meteorological Agency (1991–2020 normals, extremes 1978–present)

== Transportation ==
=== Highway ===
- Tokachi-Okhotsk Expressway
- National Route 39

=== Bus ===
The Hokkaido Kitami Bus Company has a number of inter-city as well as out-of-city routes.

=== Rail ===
The JR Hokkaido Sekihoku Main Line that passes through Kitami reached the city on October 19, 1910, when the town was still called Notsukeushi. The largest station is Kitami Station, with Nishi-Kitami Station, Hakuyo Station, and Itoshino Station also located in Kitami.

=== Air ===
The city is served by Memanbetsu Airport in the neighboring town of Ōzora.

== Sister cities ==
- Elizabeth, New Jersey, United States. Signed on June 12, 1969.
- Poronaysk, Sakhalin Oblast, Russia. Signed on August 13, 1972.
- Jinju, Gyeongsangnam-do, South Korea
- Barrhead, Alberta, Canada (Barrhead Town had a relationship with the former town of Tokoro. In 2006, Tokoro merged into Kitami city so Kitami takes over the relationship.)
- Kōchi, Kōchi, Japan
- Sakawa, Kōchi, Japan
- Marumori, Miyagi, Japan
- Ono, Gifu, Japan

== Notable people from Kitami ==
- Shinya Abe, Japanese curler and curling coach
- Kosuke Aita, Japanese curler
- Satsuki Fujisawa, Japanese curler (Skipper)
- Yumie Funayama, Japanese curler (Real Name: Yumie Hayashi, Nihongo: 林 弓枝, Hayashi Yumie)
- Takuya Furuya, Japanese professional baseball pitcher for the Chiba Lotte Marines in Japan's Nippon Professional Baseball
- Kazuhiko Ikawa, Japanese curler
- Mao Ishigaki, Japanese curler
- Takehiko Itō, Japanese manga artist (NG Knight Ramune & 40, Outlaw Star, among others)
- Ami Kikuchi, Japanese gravure idol, tarento, radio personality and J-pop idol, former member of J-pop girl group Idoling!!!
- Chiharu Kitaoka, Japanese voice actress
- Taro Kondo, Japanese speed skater
- Jake Lee, Zainichi Korean professional wrestler (Real Name: Lee Che-Gyong, Hangul: 이 체경)
- Yuta Matsumura, Japanese curler
- Miz, Japanese pop/rock singer and actress (Real Name: Mizuki Watanabe, Nihongo: 渡邊瑞枝, Watanabe Mizuki)
- Mari Motohashi, Japanese curler
- Tatsuki Nara, Japanese footballer who plays for J1 League club Avispa Fukuoka.
- Akemi Niwa, Japanese curler, a three-time Pacific-Asian champion (1993, 1997, 1998) and a three-time Japan women's champion (1997, 1998, 1999)
- Ayumi Ogasawara, Japanese curler and curling coach
- Yoshiyuki Ohmiya, Japanese curler and curling coach
- Kiyofumi Ohno, Japanese pop singer-songwriter
- Tsuyoshi Ryutaki, Japanese male curler
- Hiroshi Sato, Japanese curler and curling coach
- Yōsuke Shinoda, Japanese politician of the Liberal Democratic Party and a member of the House of Representatives in the Diet (national legislature).
- Yumi Suzuki, Japanese curler
- Megumi Takase, former Japanese football player and younger sister of Akira Takase
- Akira Takase, Japanese footballer (ReinMeer Aomori) and older brother of Megumi Takase
- Yasumasa Tanida, Japanese curler
- Makoto Tsuruga, Japanese curler
- Osamu Uno, Japanese politician of the Liberal Democratic Party and a member of the House of Representatives in the Diet (national legislature)
- Whiteberry, five-piece all-girl pop/rock band
- Chinami Yoshida, Japanese curler and older sister of Yurika Yoshida
- Yurika Yoshida, Japanese curler and younger sister of Chinami Yoshida
- Sayaka Yoshimura, Japanese curler

== In pop culture ==
The 2019 manga series Hokkaido Gals Are Super Adorable! is set in Kitami and its author, Kai Ikada, is a native of the city.

== General and cited references ==
- "Selected Essays on the History of Kitami City, Hokkaido, Japan". City of Kitami. Archived from the original on May 15, 2011.
