= Osamu Uno =

Japanese politician (born 1947)

- 宇野 治
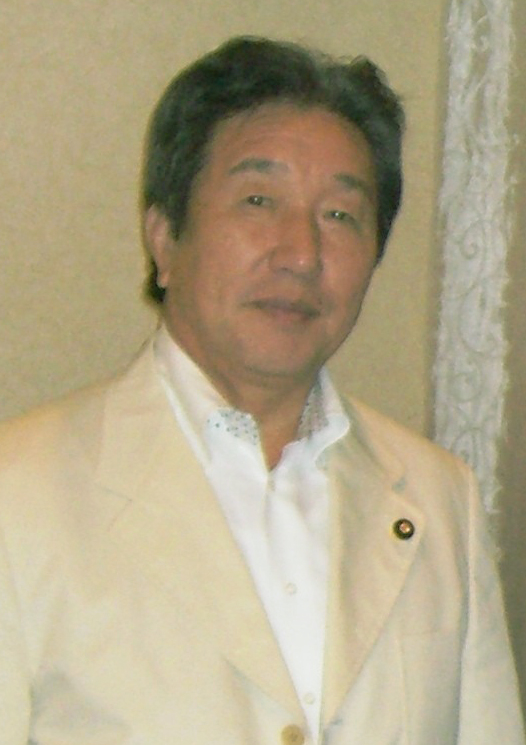
- Uno in 2007

Member of the House of Representatives
- In office 10 November 2003 – 21 July 2009
- Constituency: Kinki PR

Member of the Shiga Prefectural Assembly
- In office 1991–2003
- Constituency: Moriyama City

Personal details
- Born: 2 September 1947 (age 79) Rubeshibe, Hokkaido, Japan
- Party: Liberal Democratic
- Relatives: Sōsuke Uno (father-in-law)
- Education: Rikkyo University

Osamu Uno (宇野 治, Uno Osamu; born 2 September 1947) is a Japanese politician belonging to the Liberal Democratic Party, and a former member of the House of Representatives in the Diet (national legislature).

== Early life ==
Uno was born in Rubeshibe, Hokkaido, and raised in Tokyo. He is a graduate of Rikkyo University.

== Political career ==
Uno was elected to the first of his three terms in the assembly of Shiga Prefecture in 1991. He then ran for a seat in the House of Representatives for the first time in 2003, winning the Shiga 3rd ward Kinki Proportional seat. Uno served two terms until he was defeated by Taizō Mikazuki in the July, 2009 election.
