= Rubeshibe, Hokkaido =

Town in Hokkaido, Japan

Rubeshibe 留辺蘂町
- Town
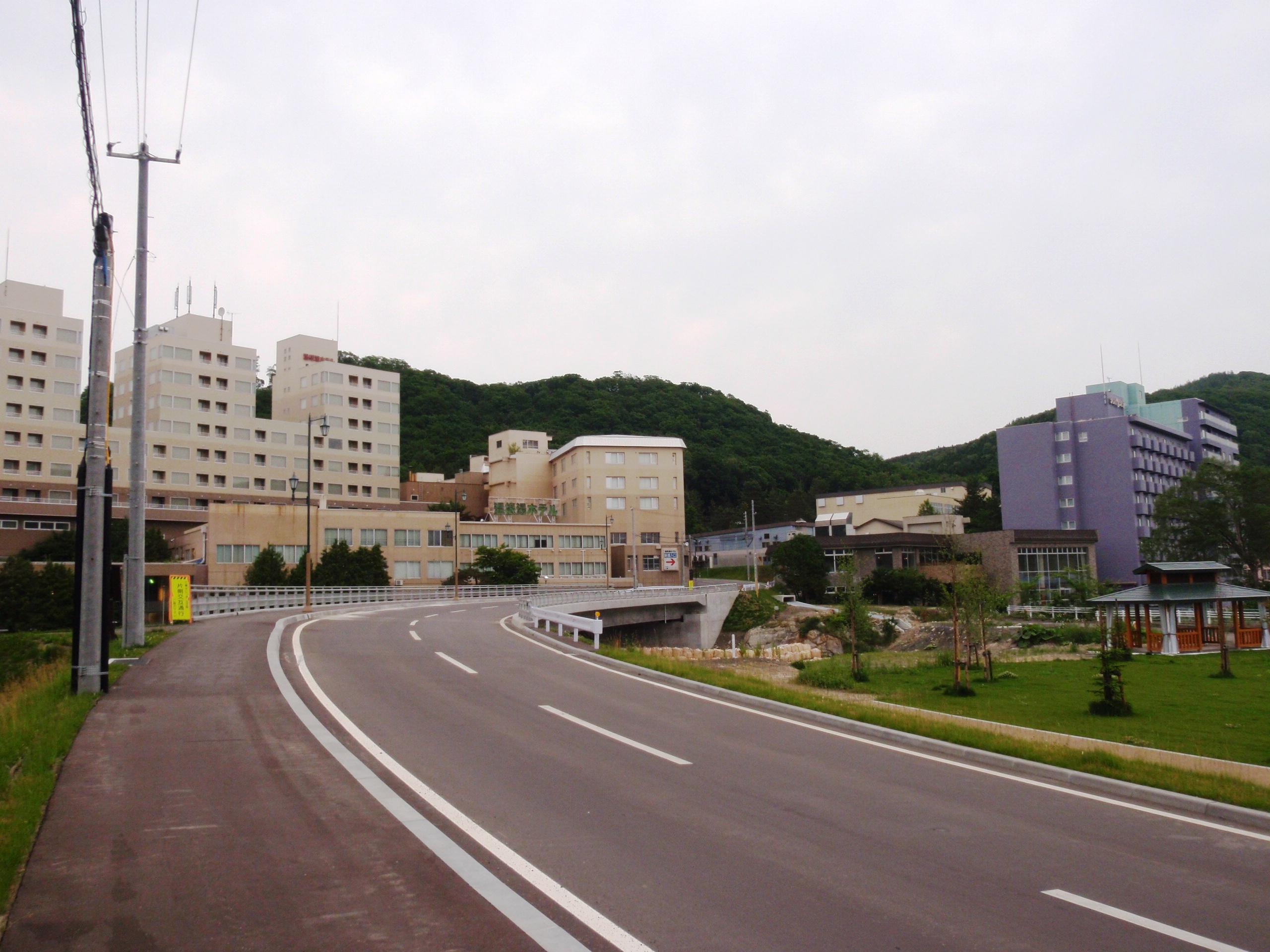
- Onneyu onsen

- Flag Emblem

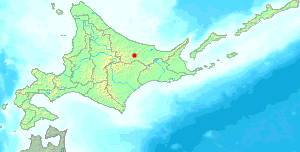
- Location of Rubeshibe in Hokkaido (Okhotsk Subprefecture)

- Location in Japan
- Coordinates: 43°47′N 143°36′E
- Country: Japan
- Region: Hokkaido
- Prefecture: Hokkaido (Okhotsk Subprefecture)
- Now part of Kitami: March 5, 2006

Area
  - Total: 564.49 km^{2} (217.95 sq mi)

Population (December 31, 2005)
  - Total: 8,704
  - Density: 15.41/km^{2} (39.9/sq mi)
- Time zone: UTC+09:00 (JST)
- City hall address: 61, Aza-Uemachi, Rubeshibe-cho, Tokoro District, Hokkaido; 091-8666
- Website: web.archive.org/web/20060212055217/http://www.town.rubeshibe.hokkaido.jp/cgi-bin/odb-get.exe?wit_template=AM02000
- Symbols
- Flower: Rhododendron dauricum
- Tree: Picea glehnii

Rubeshibe (留辺蘂町, Rubeshibe-chō) was a town located in Tokoro District, Abashiri Subprefecture (now Okhotsk Subprefecture), Hokkaido, Japan.

Since March 5, 2006 Rubeshibe, along with the towns of Tanno and Tokoro (all from Tokoro District), was merged into the expanded city of Kitami.

In December 2005, the town had an estimated population of 8,704 and a density of 15.41 persons per km^{2}. The total area was 564.69 km^{2}.

== Climate ==
Climate data for Rubeshibe (1991−2020 normals, extremes 1979−present)
Month	Jan	Feb	Mar	Apr	May	Jun	Jul	Aug	Sep	Oct	Nov	Dec	Year
Record high °C (°F)	6.4 (43.5)	12.1 (53.8)	16.5 (61.7)	28.7 (83.7)	36.4 (97.5)	36.2 (97.2)	35.6 (96.1)	34.3 (93.7)	31.5 (88.7)	27.2 (81.0)	21.1 (70.0)	13.4 (56.1)	36.4 (97.5)
Mean daily maximum °C (°F)	−4.1 (24.6)	−3.0 (26.6)	1.8 (35.2)	9.7 (49.5)	17.0 (62.6)	20.8 (69.4)	24.1 (75.4)	24.5 (76.1)	20.6 (69.1)	14.1 (57.4)	5.9 (42.6)	−1.6 (29.1)	10.8 (51.5)
Daily mean °C (°F)	−9.2 (15.4)	−8.7 (16.3)	−3.6 (25.5)	3.7 (38.7)	10.3 (50.5)	14.5 (58.1)	18.3 (64.9)	18.9 (66.0)	14.6 (58.3)	7.9 (46.2)	0.8 (33.4)	−6.5 (20.3)	5.1 (41.1)
Mean daily minimum °C (°F)	−15.0 (5.0)	−15.2 (4.6)	−9.7 (14.5)	−2.0 (28.4)	3.8 (38.8)	8.9 (48.0)	13.3 (55.9)	14.1 (57.4)	9.3 (48.7)	2.4 (36.3)	−4.0 (24.8)	−11.8 (10.8)	−0.5 (31.1)
Record low °C (°F)	−28.7 (−19.7)	−26.9 (−16.4)	−25.4 (−13.7)	−16.4 (2.5)	−5.3 (22.5)	−2.0 (28.4)	3.5 (38.3)	4.2 (39.6)	−0.8 (30.6)	−5.9 (21.4)	−16.3 (2.7)	−22.1 (−7.8)	−28.7 (−19.7)
Average precipitation mm (inches)	30.0 (1.18)	22.3 (0.88)	31.6 (1.24)	41.2 (1.62)	54.5 (2.15)	68.2 (2.69)	101.4 (3.99)	131.6 (5.18)	113.9 (4.48)	69.8 (2.75)	44.0 (1.73)	41.0 (1.61)	749.6 (29.51)
Average snowfall cm (inches)	130 (51)	105 (41)	99 (39)	31 (12)	1 (0.4)	0 (0)	0 (0)	0 (0)	0 (0)	1 (0.4)	28 (11)	110 (43)	507 (200)
Average precipitation days (≥ 0.5 mm)	7.8	6.7	8.6	8.7	8.9	9.9	10.4	11.0	10.3	8.7	9.0	8.2	108.2
Average snowy days (≥ 1 cm)	14.9	13.5	13.3	4.1	0	0	0	0	0	0.2	3.2	13.2	62.4
Mean monthly sunshine hours	114.7	117.2	151.8	166.5	173.6	152.3	146.2	137.9	142.1	153.4	124.8	117.7	1,698.1
Source: JMA
