= Kiyofumi Ohno =

Japanese singer

Kiyofumi Ohno (オーノキヨフミ, 大野清文, Ôno Kiyofumi; born September 29, 1978) is a Japanese pop singer-songwriter from Kitami, Hokkaido. He came out with the song "Heibon" in 2004.

== Discography ==
=== Singles ===
	Original Japanese Title	Romanized Name	Translation of Title	Release date
1.	平凡	Heibon	Commonplace	April 21, 2004
2.	ショッキングエクスプレス	Shocking Express	Shocking Express	August 4, 2004
3.	新宿西口摩天楼	Shinjuku Nishiguchi Matenrô	Skyscrapers at Western Shinjuku	August 24, 2005
4.	100マイル	Hyaku mile	100 miles	January 25, 2006

=== Albums ===
	Original Japanese Title	Romanized Name	Translation of Title	Release date
1.	君に太陽を!	Kimi ni Taiyô o	Giving the Sun to You	September 22, 2004
2.	Country Map			March 8, 2006

=== Indies ===
	Original Japanese Title	Romanized Name	Translation of Title	Release date
Album	世界0	Sekai Zero	World Zero	December 7, 2001
Single	ピンクのライオン	Pink no Lion	Pink Lion	April 26, 2002
