= Oketo, Hokkaido =

Oketo 置戸町
- Town
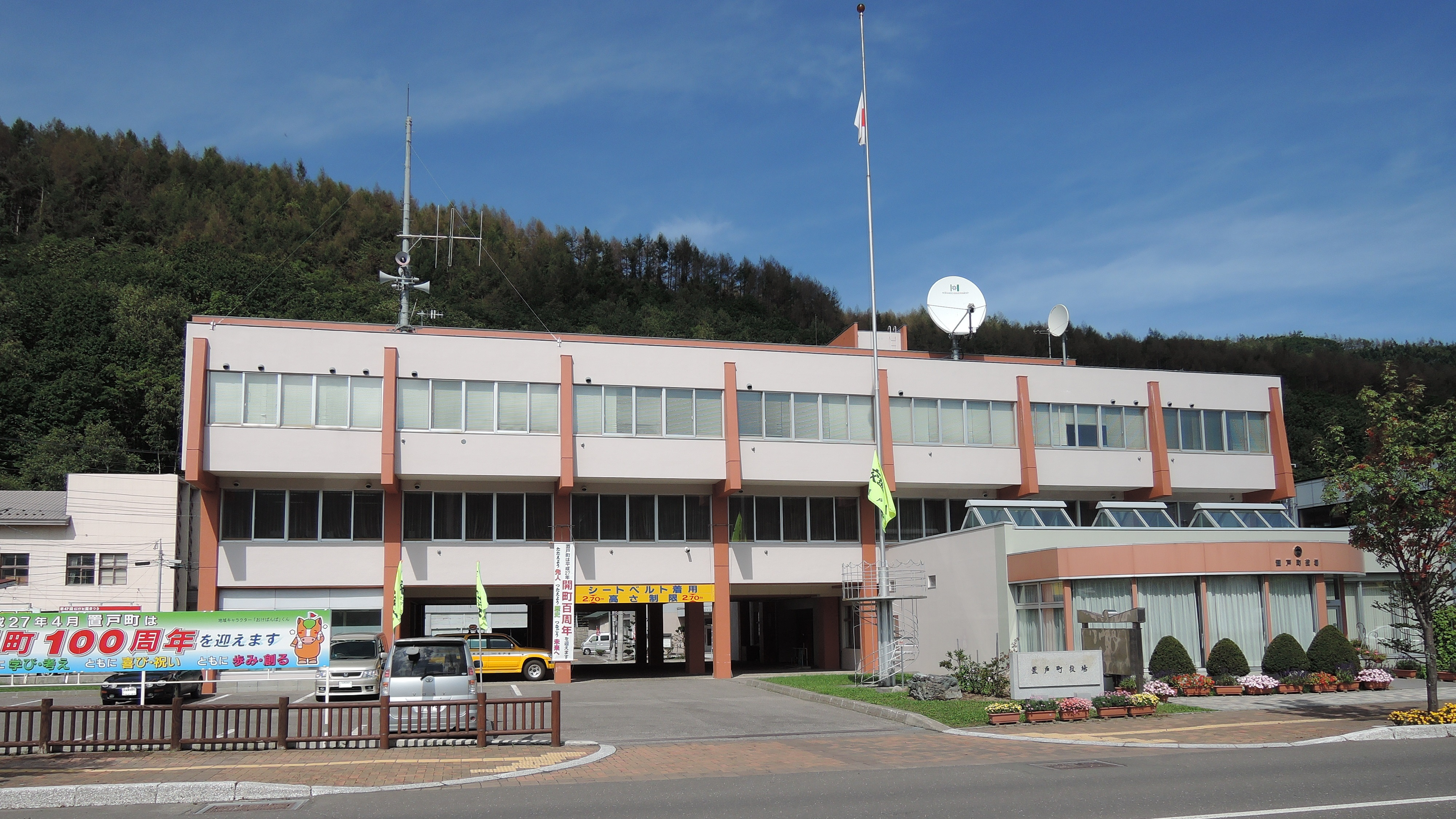
- Oketo town hall

- Flag Seal

- Location of Oketo in Hokkaido (Okhotsk Subprefecture)

- Location in Japan
- Coordinates: 43°41′N 143°35′E
- Country: Japan
- Region: Hokkaido
- Prefecture: Hokkaido (Okhotsk Subprefecture)
- District: Tokoro

Area
  - Total: 527.54 km^{2} (203.68 sq mi)

Population (July 30, 2020)
  - Total: 2,443
  - Density: 4.631/km^{2} (11.99/sq mi)
- Time zone: UTC+09:00 (JST)
- Website: www.town.oketo.hokkaido.jp

Oketo (置戸町, Oketo-chō) is a town located in Okhotsk Subprefecture, Hokkaido, Japan.

The name Oketo is derived from the original Ainu name for the tributary entering the Tokoro River. "O-ket-un-nai" means the river at whose mouth there are drying/stretching frames for animal skins.

As of July 2020, the town has an estimated population of 2,443 and a population density of 5.8 persons per km^{2}. The total area is 527.54 km^{2}.

Oketo was originally a logging community, and is currently involved in farming as well. Popular crops include potatoes, white flower beans and beets. Dairy farming and cattle farming are also practiced. Oketo was the tug-of-war champion of Japan for a number of years in the 1960s. That tradition of showing strength continues today in the Ningen Banba festival which is held in July every year. During the Ningen Bamba, teams of 5 or 7 men pull sleds of logs over man-made hills to the finish line.

== Education ==
Oketo has one elementary school, Oketo Elementary School. Previously, the town had four active elementary schools but due to the decline in population, three of them have been closed. Oketo Junior High School is the only junior high school in town. There is also a prefectural high school located in Oketo, Oketo High School, which offers a social welfare course of study.

== History ==
Oketo is well known in Japan for its wood crafts, called Oke-Craft. The majority of these crafts are household objects such as plates and bowls. They are usually made from a local white pine. In prehistoric times the mountains near Oketo (e.g. Oketoyama) were a major source of obsidian used for cutting tools and arrowheads.

== Mascot ==
Okebamba-kun, the town's mascot

Oketo's mascot is Okebamba-kun (おけばんばくん). He is a gentle nature-loving horse. He lives in the outskirts of Oketo. He is laid-back yet very sloppy. He is used to be a skilled Ningenbanba (Human Horse) competitor but retired as a result of many loses. He became a park golfer instead. When he is on his break, he goes to Katsuyama Onsen Yuyu while having a nice meal. He always bring his personal oke (a traditional bucket). His mane resembles that of the Oketo Park Golf Course.
