= Hokkaido College of Pharmacy =

Coordinates: 43°8′33.3″N 141°8′28.4″E

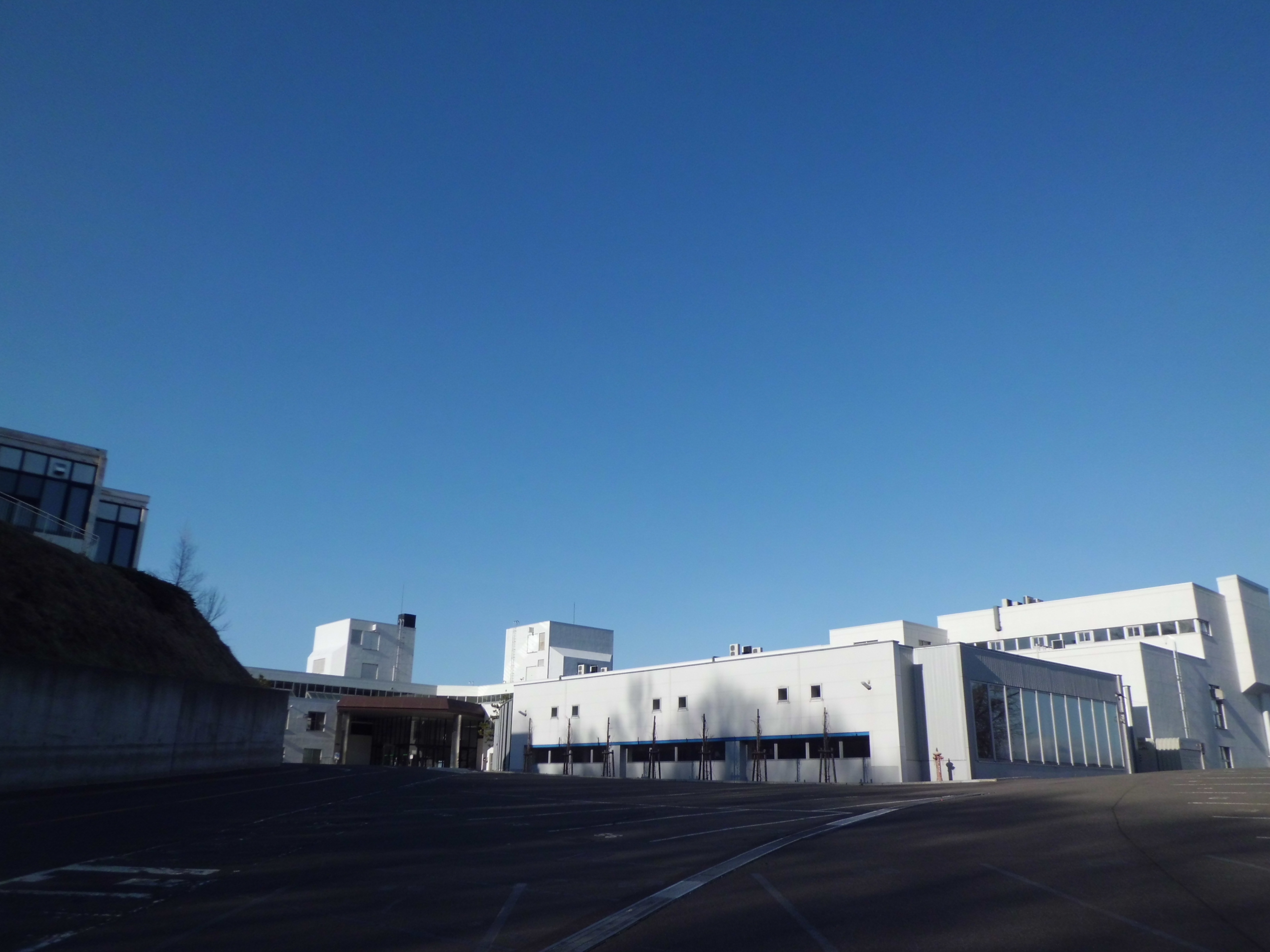
Hokkaido College of Pharmacy Otaru Campus

Hokkaido College of Pharmacy (北海道薬科大学, Hokkaidō yakka daigaku) was a private university in Otaru, Hokkaidō, Japan, established in 1974. The predecessor of the school, a vocational school for car-driving, was founded in 1924. The school closed in 2018.
