= Japanese Red Cross Hokkaido College of Nursing =

Coordinates: 43.8300689°N 143.9068651°E

- 日本赤十字北海道看護大学
- Motto: study for the development of nursing science
- Type: private
- Established: 1999
- President: Toku, Ishiy
- Undergraduates: 450
- Postgraduates: 25
- Location: Kitami, Hokkaidō, Japan
- Campus: Urban
- Nickname: JRCH
- Mascot: None
- Website: www.rchokkaido-cn.ac.jp

Japanese Red Cross Hokkaido College of Nursing (日本赤十字北海道看護大学, Nihon Sekijuuji Hokkaidō Kango daigaku) or JRCH is a private university in Kitami, Hokkaidō, Japan, established in 1999.

== History ==
The forerunners of Japanese Red Cross Hokkaido College of Nursing are the school of Nursing in Asahikawa (founded in 1923), Kitami (1939), and Kushiro (1966). These schools were integrated, and JRCH was established in 1999 by the Japanese Red Cross.

== Faculties and graduate schools ==
=== Faculties ===
JRCH has only one faculty, Nursing.

=== Graduate schools ===
JRCH has two graduate schools:

- Major in Nursing science
- Major in Certified Nurse Midwife (CNM)

=== Centers ===
- Center of Nurse Education

== Partner universities ==
- (Japan) Asahikawa Medical University
- (Japan) Kitami Institute of Technology

== See also ==
- List of universities in Japan
