= Japanese Red Cross Toyota College of Nursing =

- 日本赤十字豊田看護大学
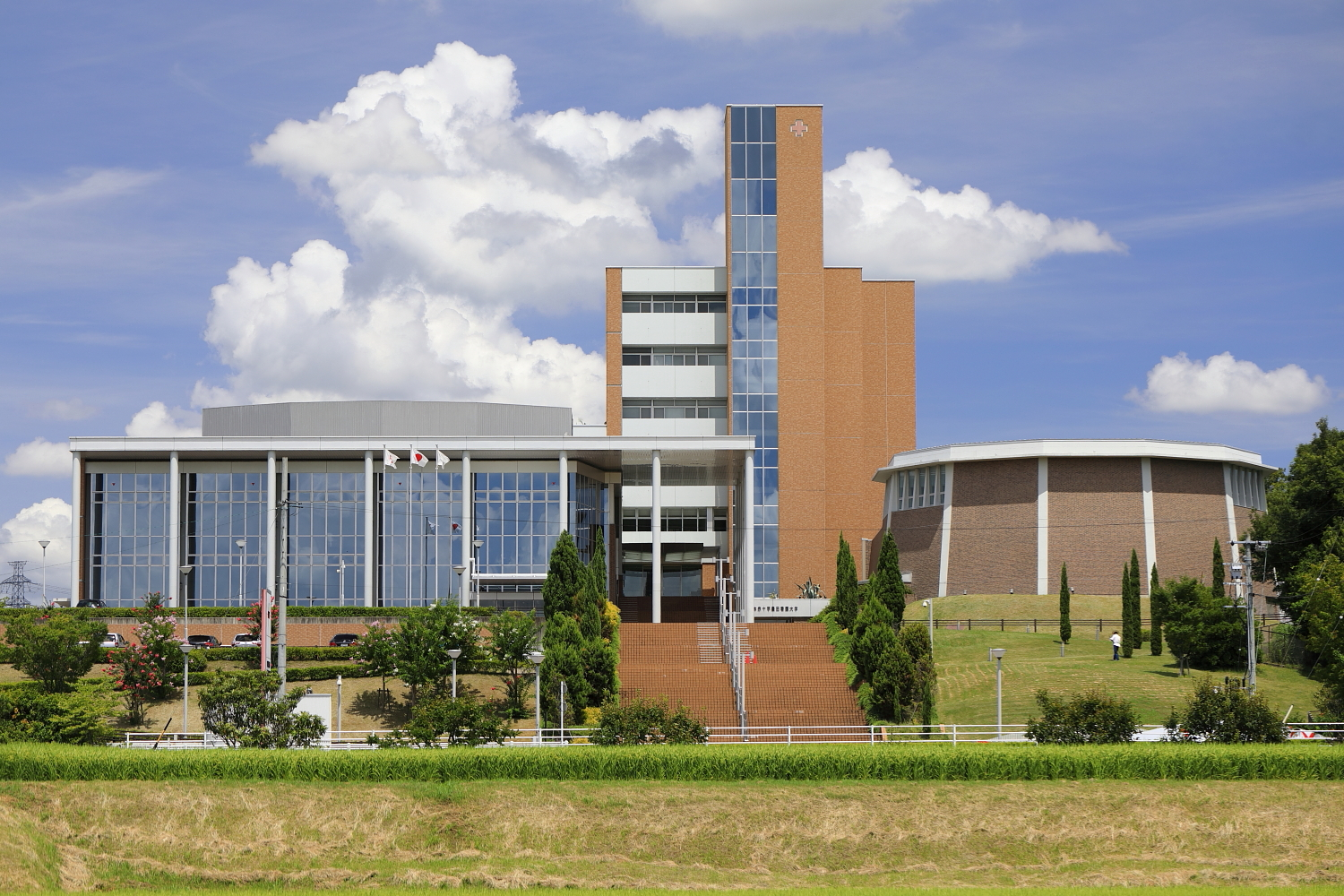
- Japanese Red Cross Toyota College of Nursing
- Motto: 人間を救うのは、人間だ。
- Motto in English: Together, for Humanity
- Type: Private
- Established: 1941
- Location: Toyota, Aichi, Japan; 35.1027°N 137.1194°E
- Website: www.rctoyota.ac.jp (in Japanese)

Japanese Red Cross Toyota College of Nursing (日本赤十字豊田看護大学, Nihon sekijūji toyota kango daigaku) is a private university in Toyota, Aichi, Japan. The predecessor of the school, a training school for nurses, was founded in 1941. It was chartered in 1989 as a women's junior college called Japan Red Cross Aichi Junior College of Nursing. In 1997 it became coeducational. In 2004 it became a four-year college, adopting the present name at the same time.
