= Tokoro District =

District in Hokkaido, Japan

Coordinates: 44°01′48″N 143°49′48″E

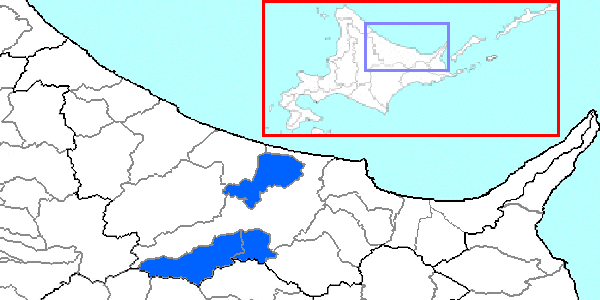
Location of Tokoro District in Okhotsk Subprefecture

Tokoro (常呂郡, Tokoro-gun) is a district located in Okhotsk Subprefecture, Hokkaido, Japan.

As of 2005, the district has an estimated population of 16,291 and a population density of 15 persons per km^{2}. The total area is 1,123.42 km^{2}.

== Towns and villages ==
- Kunneppu
- Oketo
- Saroma
