= Nagoya Seirei Junior College =

- 名古屋聖霊短期大学
- Type: Private; Women's college Junior college
- Established: 1970
- Location: Seto, Aichi, Japan
- Website: http://www.s-dousoukai.com/

Nagoya Seirei Junior College (名古屋聖霊短期大学, Nagoya Seirei Tanki Daigaku) was a private junior college in the city of Seto, Aichi Prefecture, Japan.

== History ==
The school was founded in 1948 under the name was Nagoya Seirei Gakuen (名古屋聖霊学園). It was chartered as a junior college in 1970. In 2005 the college was discontinued. The junior college was one of the schools in Nanzan Gakuen.
