= Kawana ware =

Type of Japanese pottery

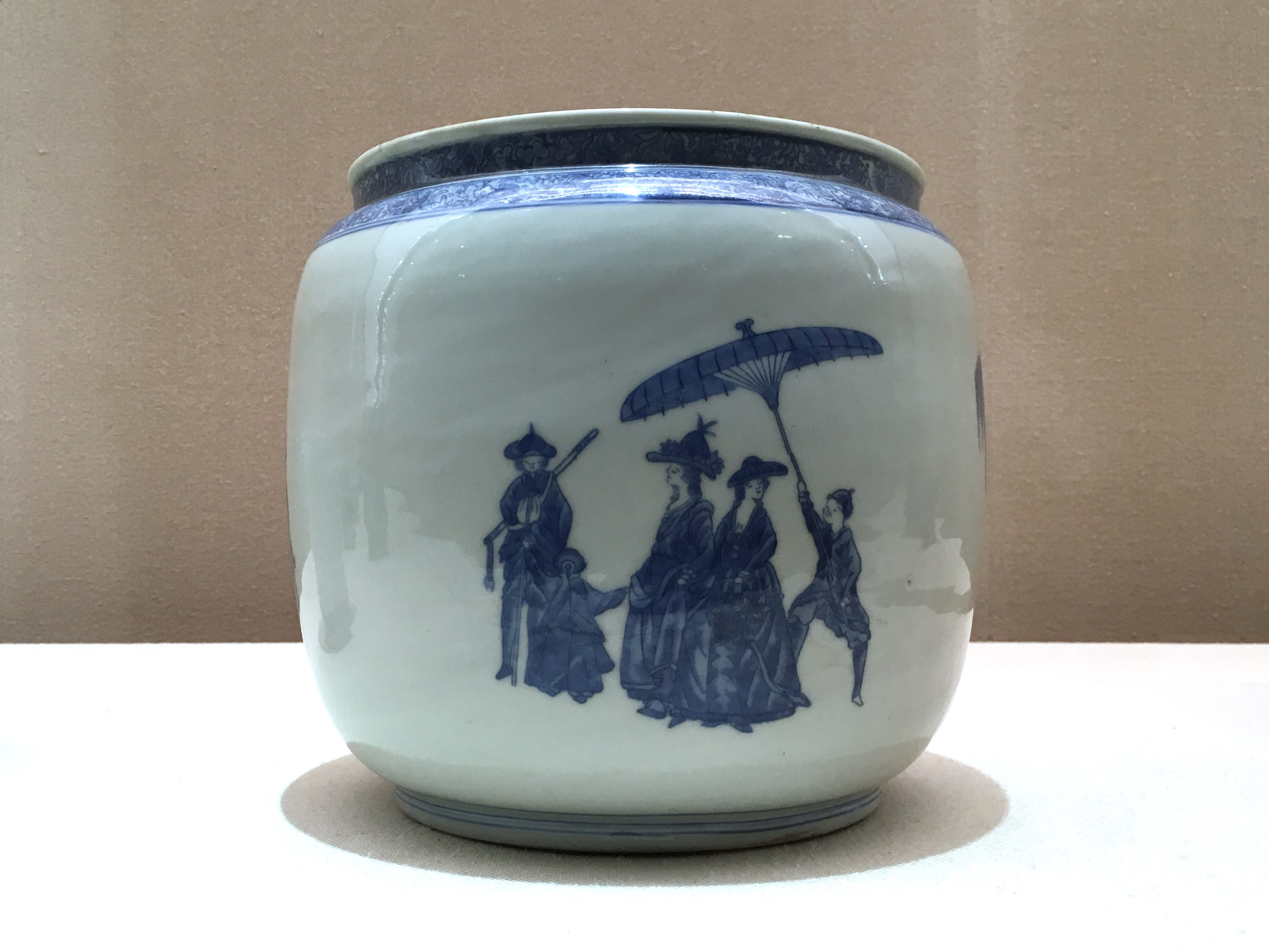
Kawana ware porcelain jar, with a decoration of women in western dress transfer-printed in blue under a transparent glaze. Edo period, mid-19th century

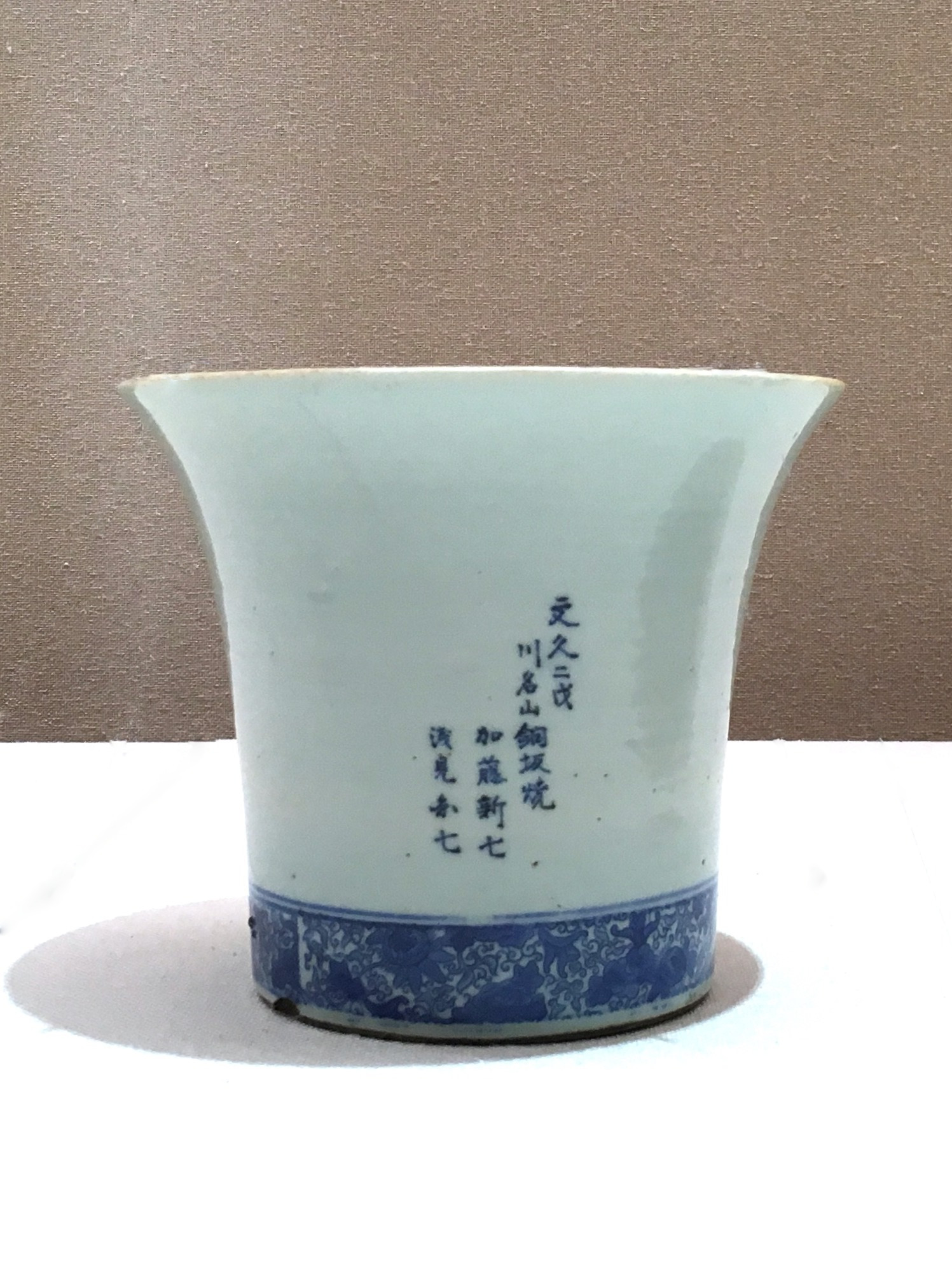
Porcelain jar, with decoration transfer-printed in blue under a transparent glaze. Edo period, mid-19th century

Kawana ware (川名焼, Kawana-yaki) refers to a type of Japanese porcelain produced in and around the area of Kawana (川名), today Kawanayama-chō (川名山町) in Shōwa-ku, Nagoya, central Japan. It is of the sometsuke (染付) blue and white pottery type, but notable for using the English technique of transfer printing.

== History ==
In Japan, transfer printing by copperplate was attempted at the end of the Edo period. This technique was used in Mino's Risen ware (里泉焼) from Mizunami, Gifu and Owari's Kawana ware from Nagoya. In the Buddhist temple Kōjaku-in (香積院) compound in Kawana village, a kiln was opened in the middle of the Kaei era (1848–54) by Kato Shinshichi (加藤新七), who was a disciple of the third generation Kawamoto Jihyoe (三代川本治兵) from Seto. Regular sometsuke ware was initially produced, however craftsmen from Seto protested against it. In reaction Kato Shinshichi tried a new direction by producing items with copper plate transfer printing. In Europe the transfer printing technique for ceramic ware was developed in the 18th century. This technique enables the production of patterns of consistent quality. The size of the kiln and the resulting production volume at Kōjaku-in was small and sales numbers were commercially limited. The kiln operated until 1888. In Japan only starting in Meiji 20 (1887) did large-scale industrial production commence in Hizen.

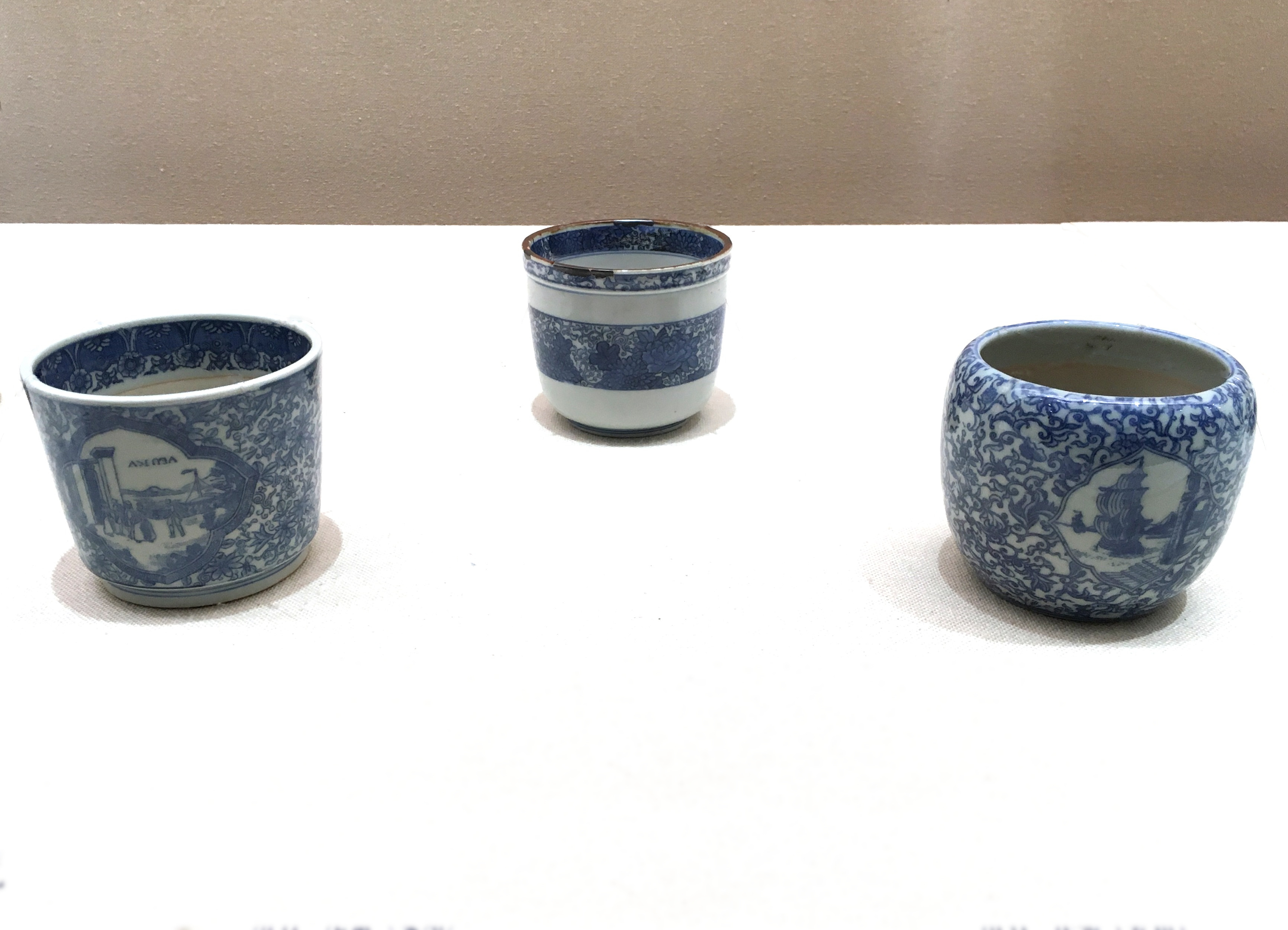
Porcelain cups, with decoration transfer-printed in blue under a transparent glaze. Edo period, mid-19th century

The Nagoya City Museum owns a collection of Kawana ware.

== Characteristics ==
Smaller-sized items were produced such as cups and bottles, but some rare larger items also exist. Patterns were in blue-and-white sometsuke, depicting European-style ladies, western-style sailing ships, soldiers and the like, by a copperplate transfer printing technique. On the bottom of the stand the stamp "Dainihon O(wari)-shū Kawanayama sei" (大日本張州川名山製) would be found.

== See also ==
Other pottery wares from Nagoya and the wider region:

- Ofuke ware
- Hōraku ware
- Sasashima ware
- Inuyama ware
- Tokoname ware
