= Jōkō-ji =

Jōkō-ji may refer to:

- Jōkō-ji (Seto), Buddhist temple in Seto, Aichi Prefecture, Japan
- Jōkō-ji (Yao), Buddhist temple in Yao, Osaka Prefecture, Japan
