= Yamaguchi Station (Aichi) =

Railway station in Seto, Aichi Prefecture, Japan

Yamaguchi Station 山口駅
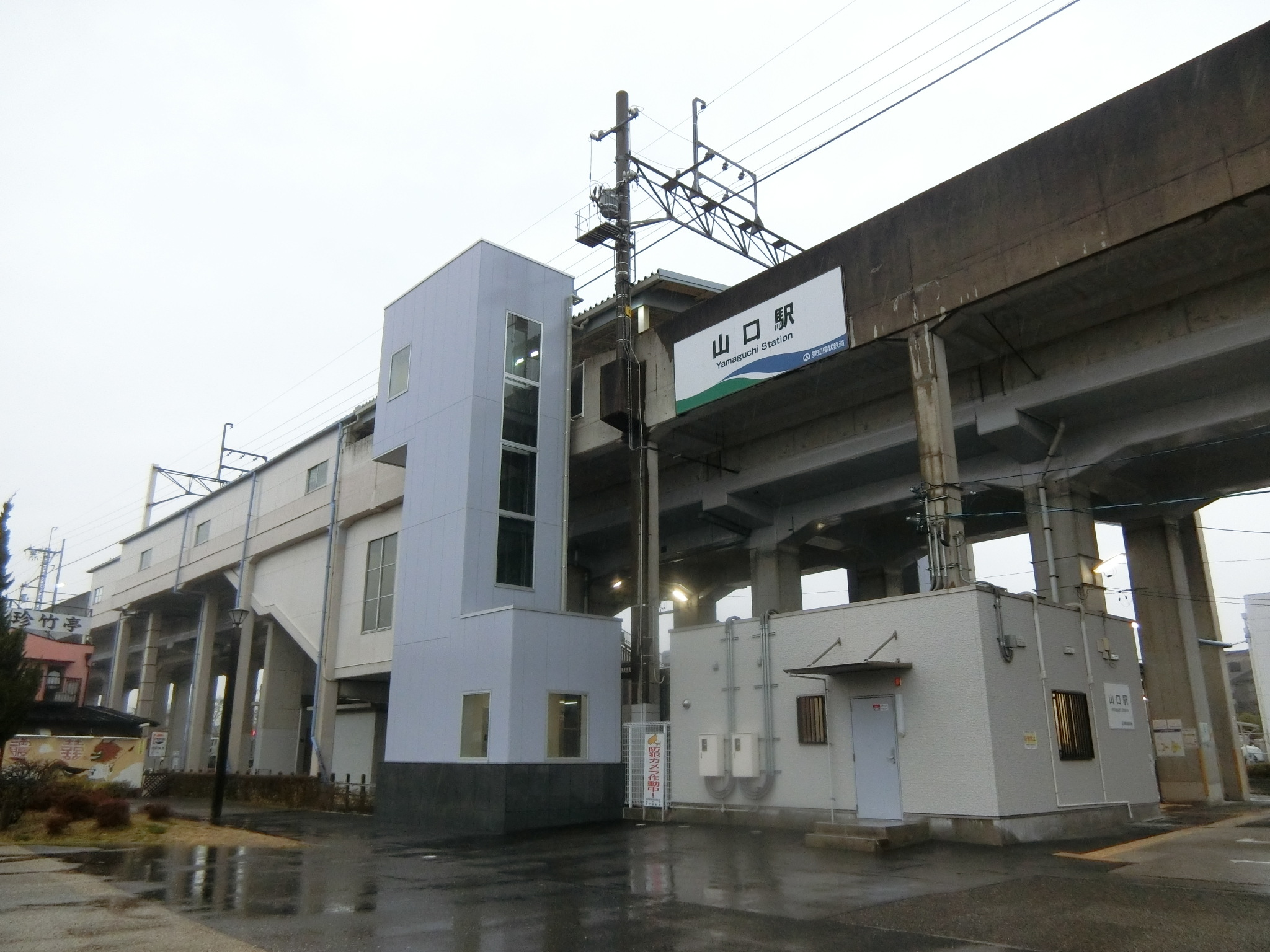
- Yamaguchi Station in March 2018

General information
- Location: Tanakacho 15, Seto-shi, Aichi-ken 489-0961; Japan
- Coordinates: 35.1978°N 137.102°E
- Operator: Aichi Loop Railway
- Line: ■ Aichi Loop Line
- Distance: 34.6 kilometers from Okazaki
- Platforms: 2 side platforms

Other information
- Status: Staffed
- Station code: 19
- Website: Official website

History
- Opened: January 31, 1988

Passengers
- FY2017: 1791 daily
Location
- Location within Aichi Prefecture Location within Japan

Yamaguchi Station (山口駅, Yamaguchi-eki) is a railway station in the city of Seto, Aichi Prefecture, Japan, operated by the third sector Aichi Loop Railway Company.

== Lines ==
Yamaguchi Station is served by the Aichi Loop Line, and is located 34.6 kilometers from the starting point of the line at Okazaki.

== Station layout ==
The station has two elevated opposed side platforms, with the station building located underneath. The station building has automated ticket machines, TOICA automated turnstiles and is staffed.

== Adjacent stations ==
«	Service	»
Aichi Loop Line
Yakusa	-	Setoguchi

== Station history ==
Yamaguchi Station was opened on January 31, 1988 together with the establishment of the Aichi Loop Railway Company.

== Passenger statistics ==
In fiscal 2017, the station was used by an average of 1791 passengers daily.

== Surrounding area ==
- Aichi Prefectural Ceramic Museum

== See also ==
- List of railway stations in Japan
