= Setoshi Station =

Railway station in Seto, Aichi Prefecture, Japan

Setoshi Station 瀬戸市駅
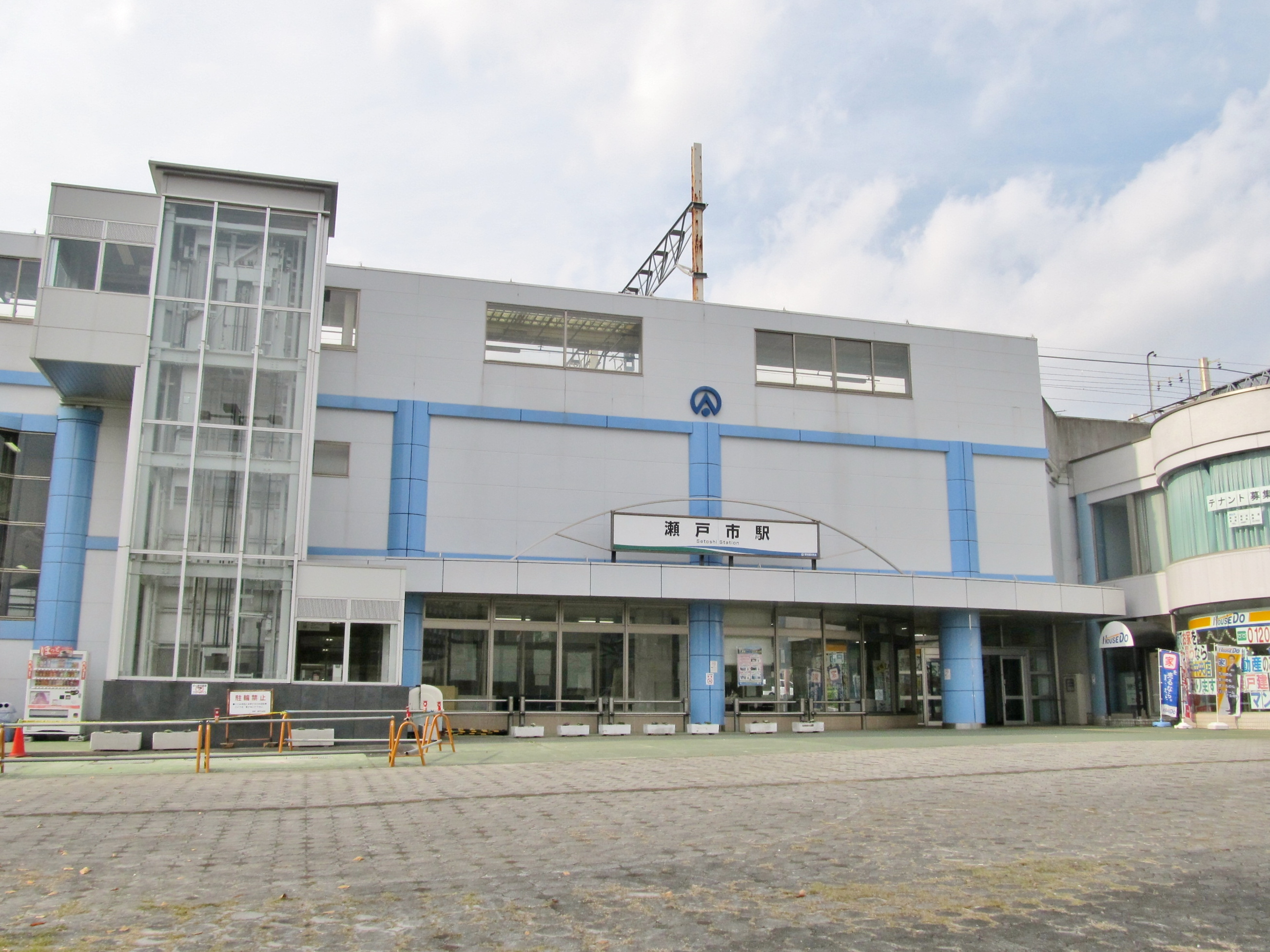
- Setoshi Station in December 2018

General information
- Location: 114-3 Higashiyokoyamachō, Seto-shi, Aichi-ken 489-0066; Japan
- Coordinates: 35.2259°N 137.0791°E
- Operator: Aichi Loop Railway
- Line: ■ Aichi Loop Line
- Distance: 49.1 kilometers from Okazaki
- Platforms: 2 side platforms

Other information
- Status: Staffed
- Station code: 21
- Website: Official website

History
- Opened: January 31, 1988

Passengers
- FY2017: 6339 daily
Location
- Location within Aichi Prefecture Location within Japan

Setoshi Station (瀬戸市駅, Setoshi-eki) is a railway station in the city of Seto, Aichi Prefecture, Japan, operated by the third sector Aichi Loop Railway Company.

== Lines ==
Setoshi Station is served by the Aichi Loop Line, and is located 39.1 kilometers from the starting point of the line at Okazaki.

== Station layout ==
The station has two elevated opposed side platforms, with the station building located underneath. The station building has automated ticket machines, TOICA automated turnstiles and is staffed.

== Adjacent stations ==
«	Service	»
Aichi Loop Line
Setoguchi	-	Nakamizuno

== Station history ==
Setoshi Station was opened on January 31, 1988 together with the establishment of the Aichi Loop Railway Company.

== Passenger statistics ==
In fiscal 2017, the station was used by an average of 6339 passengers daily.

== Surrounding area ==
- Seto Fire Department
- Suinan Elementary School

== See also ==
- List of railway stations in Japan
