= Kōjaku-in =

Coordinates: 35.1469°N 136.9573°E

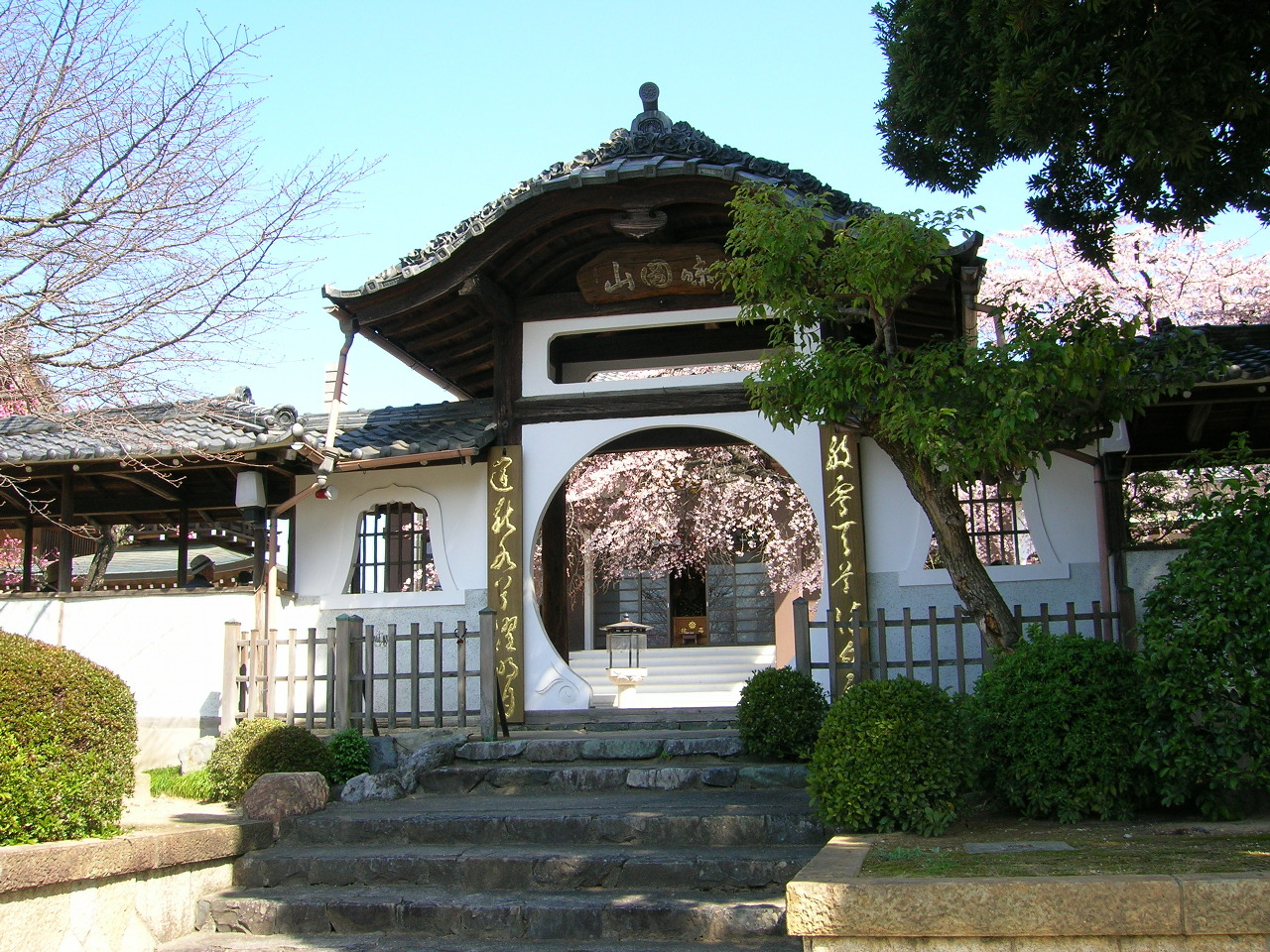
One of the gates of the Kōjaku-in

Kōjaku-in (香積院) is a Buddhist temple in Kawanayama-chō, Shōwa-ku, Nagoya, Aichi prefecture in central Japan.

The temple is associated with the production of Kawana ware during the Edo period.
