= Setoguchi Station =

Railway station in Seto, Aichi Prefecture, Japan

Setoguchi Station 瀬戸口駅
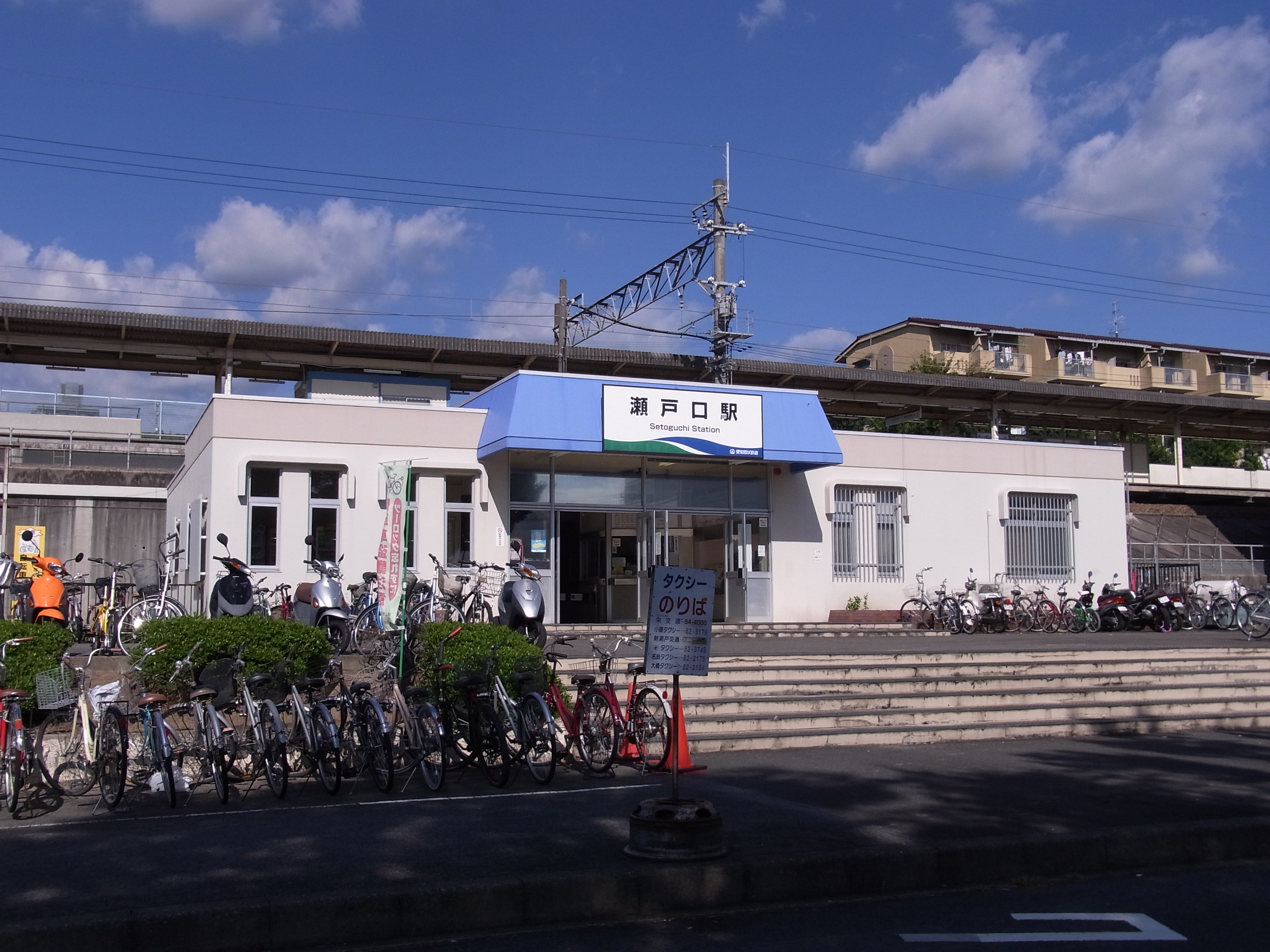
- Setoguchi Station in September 2018

General information
- Location: 2-220 Higashiakashigechō. Seto-shi, Aichi-ken 489-0877; Japan
- Coordinates: 35.2066°N 137.0822°E
- Operator: Aichi Loop Railway
- Line: ■ Aichi Loop Line
- Distance: 36.7 kilometers from Okazaki
- Platforms: 2 side platforms

Other information
- Status: Staffed
- Station code: 20
- Website: Official website

History
- Opened: January 31, 1988

Passengers
- FY2017: 4085 daily
Location
- Location within Aichi Prefecture Location within Japan

Setoguchi Station (瀬戸口駅, Setoguchi-eki) is a railway station in the city of Seto, Aichi Prefecture, Japan, operated by the third sector Aichi Loop Railway Company.

== Lines ==
Setoguchi Station is served by the Aichi Loop Line, and is located 36.7 kilometers from the starting point of the line at Okazaki.

== Station layout ==
The station has two elevated opposed side platforms, with the station building located underneath. The station building has automated ticket machines, TOICA automated turnstiles and is staffed.

== Adjacent stations ==
«	Service	»
Aichi Loop Line
Yamaguchi	-	Setoshi

== Station history ==
Setoguchi Station was opened on January 31, 1988 together with the establishment of the Aichi Loop Railway Company.

== Passenger statistics ==
In fiscal 2017, the station was used by an average of 4085 passengers daily.

== Surrounding area ==
- Seto Nishi High School

== See also ==
- List of railway stations in Japan
