= Kawanayama-chō =

Neighbourhood in Nagoya, Japan

Coordinates: 35°08′49″N 136°57′18″E

Kawanayama-chō (川名山町) is a neighbourhood in Shōwa-ku, Nagoya, central Japan.

Kawana used to be a village and was later incorporated in the 1930s.

The Buddhist temple of Kōjaku-in is located there. Kawana ware used to be produced there during the late Edo period.

Also located there is the Chukyo University Senior High School and the Holy Spirit Hospital (聖霊病院, Seireibyōin).

It is served by Kawana Station and Irinaka Station on the Nagoya Subway Tsurumai Line.

The area of Yagoto is next to it.

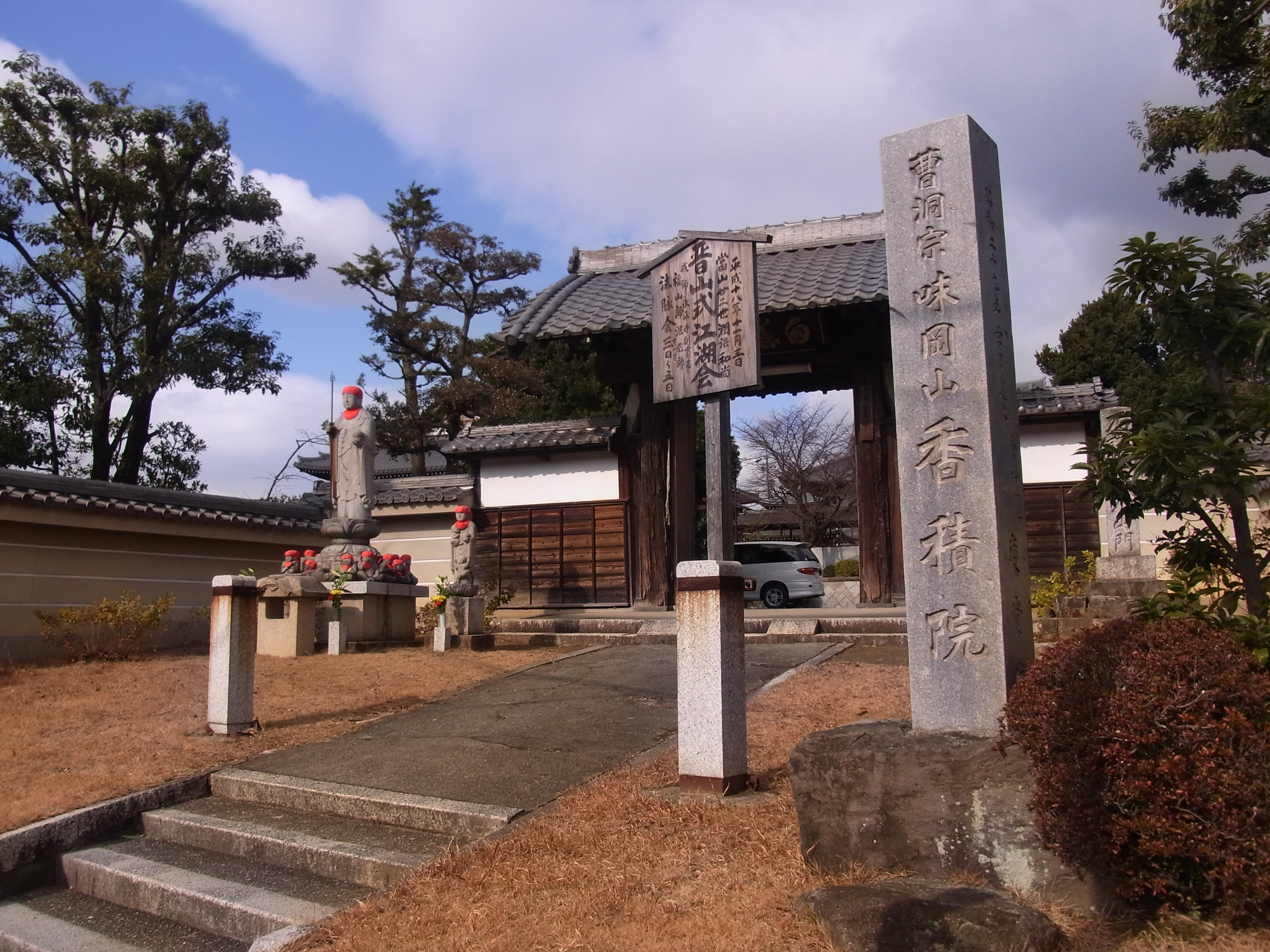
Main gate of Kōjaku-in

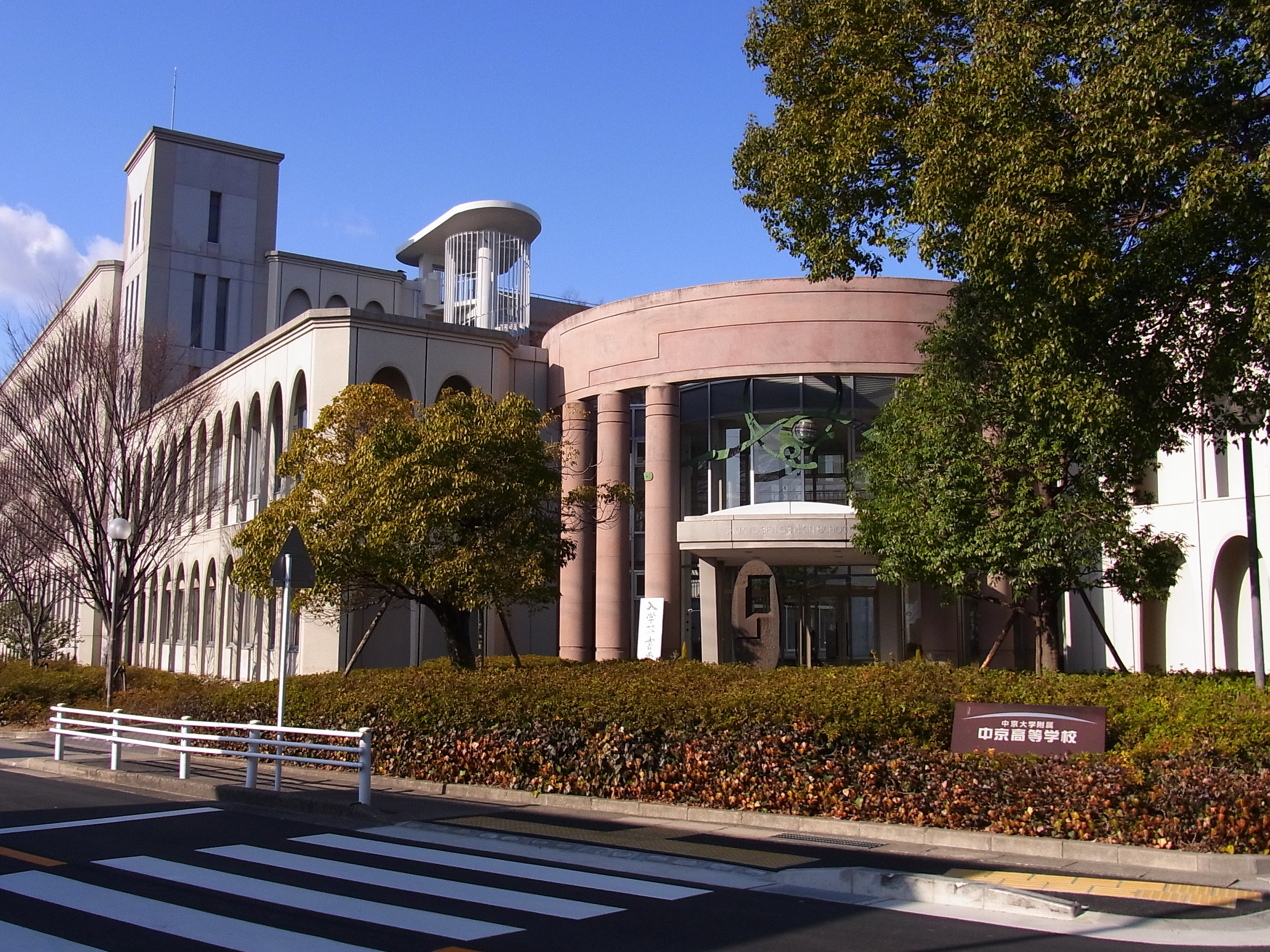
Chukyo University Senior High School

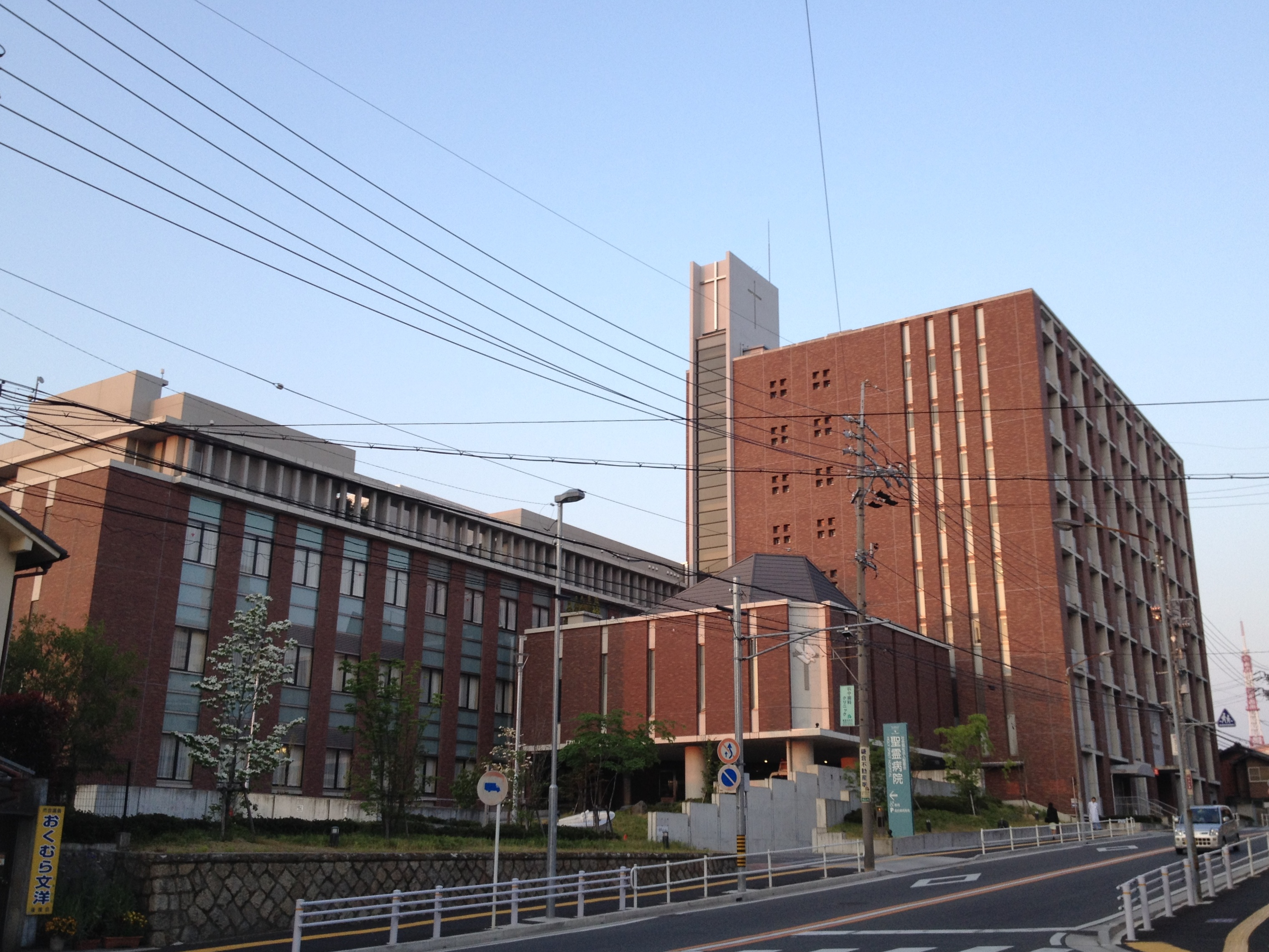
Holy Spirit Hospital

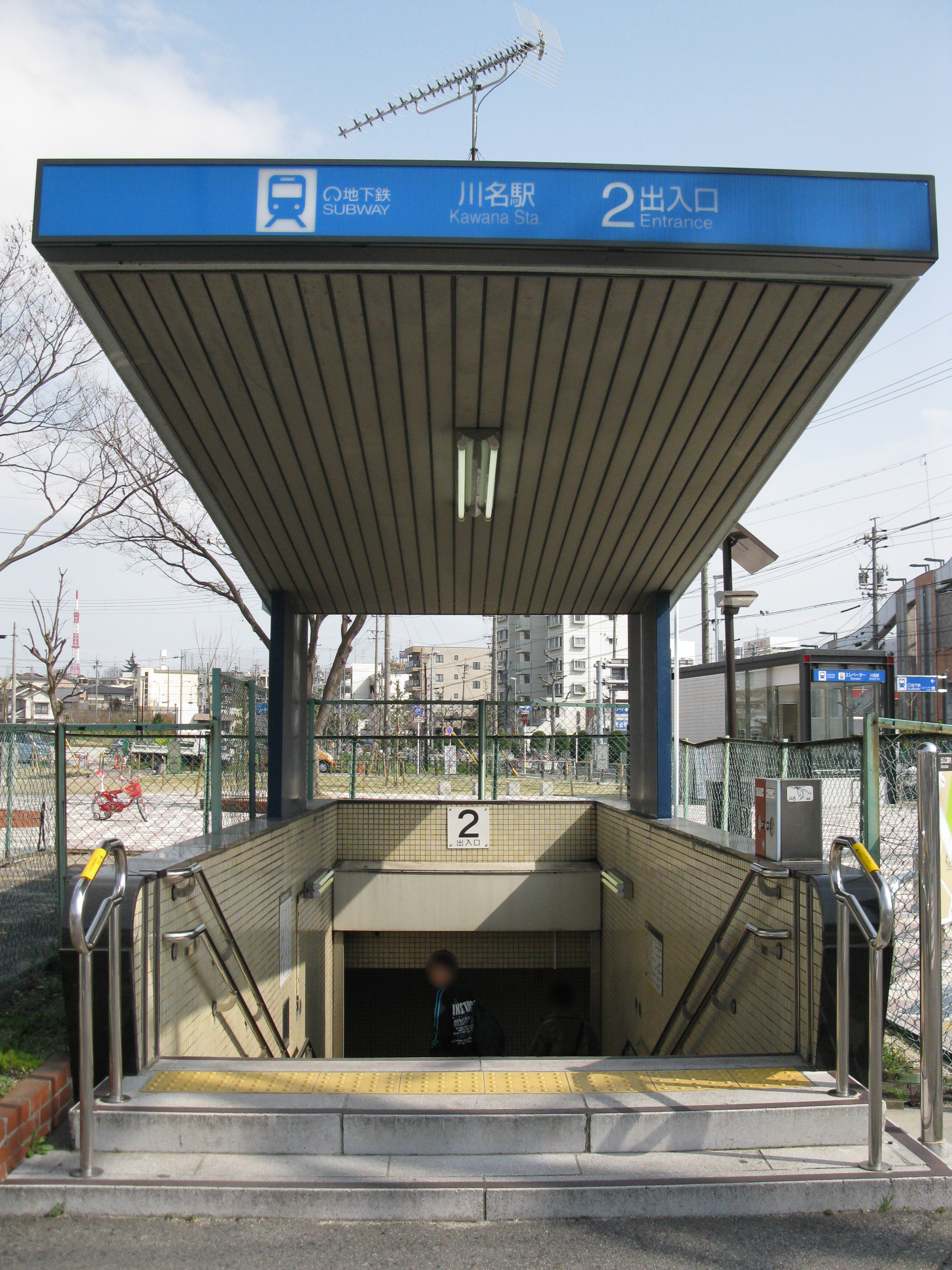
Kawana subway station
