= Jōkō-ji (Seto) =

Buddhist temple in Seto, Aichi, Japan

Coordinates: 35°16′48.4″N 137°5′29.0″E

- 定光寺
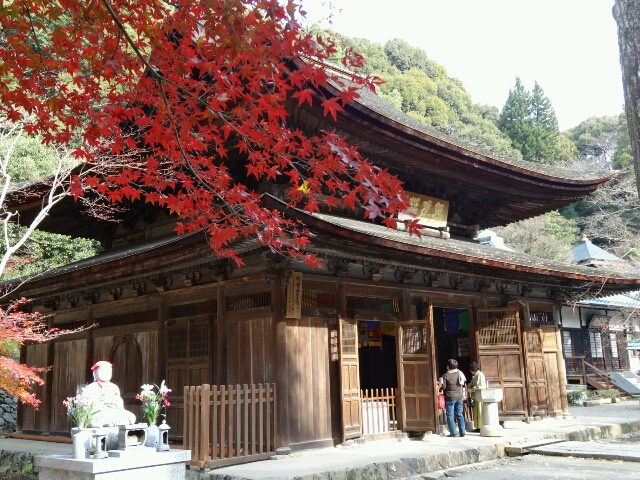
- Hondō

- Jōkō-ji Jōkō-ji (Seto) (Japan)

Religion
- Affiliation: Buddhist
- Deity: Jizō Bosatsu
- Rite: Rinzai school

Location
- Location: Seto, Aichi
- Country: Japan
- Interactive map of Jōkō-ji

Architecture
- Completed: 1336

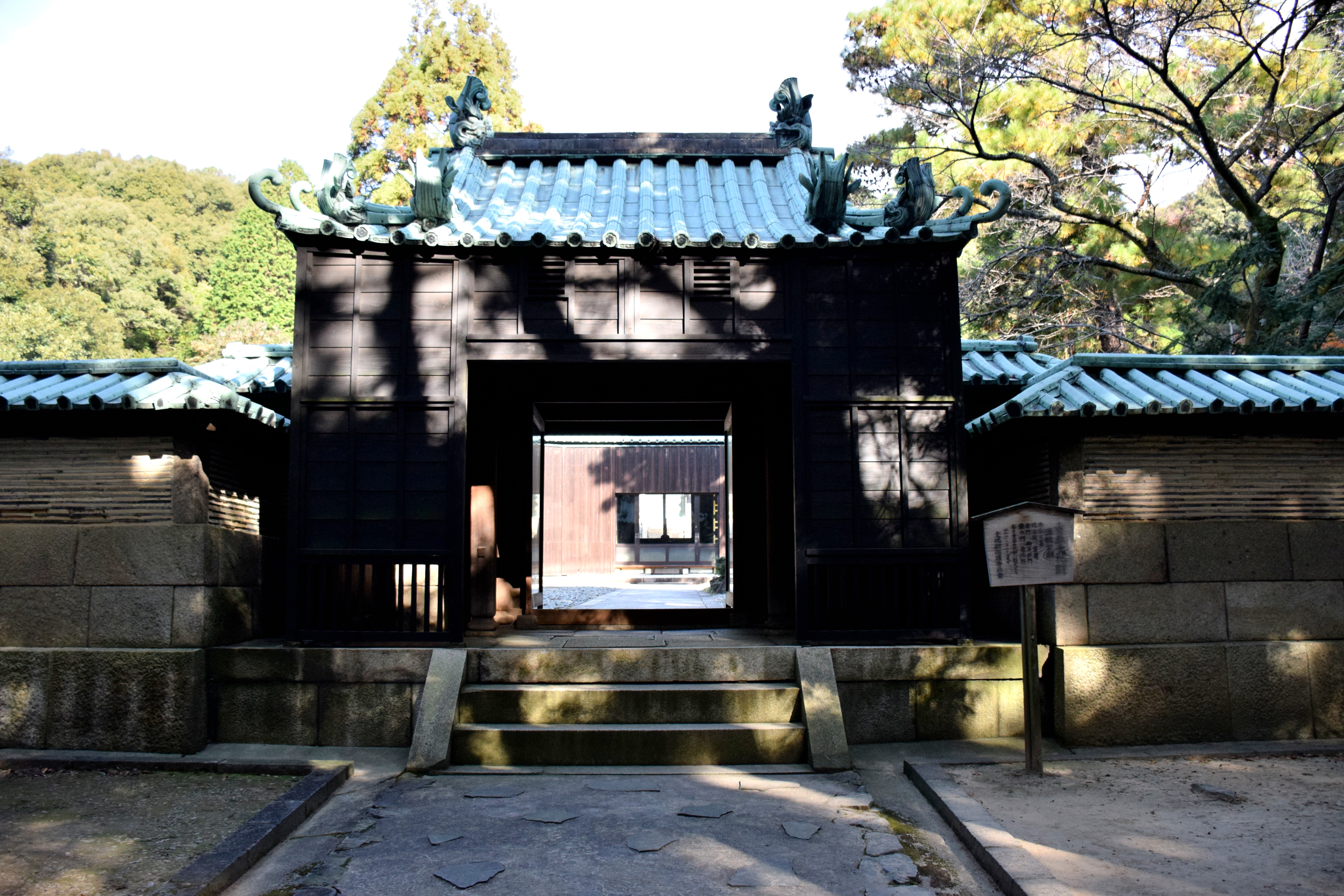
Gate to the Mausoleum of Tokugawa Yoshinao at Jōkō-ji, Seto

Jōkō-ji (定光寺) is a Buddhist temple belonging to the Myōshin-ji branch of the Rinzai school of Japanese Zen, Buddhism located in the city of Seto, Aichi Prefecture, Japan. Its main image is a statue of Jizō Bosatsu. The temple is noted for the mausoleum of Tokugawa Yoshinao, the son of Tokugawa Ieyasu and founding daimyō of Owari Domain; however it was not the bodaiji of the clan.

== History ==
The temple was founded in 1336 under the sponsorship of Mizuno Munekuni, one of the ancestors of the Mizuno clan, and initially belonged to the Kencho-ji branch of the Rinzai school. It changed to Myōshin-ji branch in 1649. It was selected as the site for Tokugawa Yoshinao's tomb in 1650, and was supported by the Owari-Tokugawa family until the end of the Tokugawa shogunate and the Meiji restoration. In 1936, the 19th generation head of the clan, Tokugawa Yoshichika ordered that the 170 graves in the clan cemetery be abolished, and the remains stored in an underground ossuary. His remains were added to the ossuary on his death in 1976.

The Hondō of the temple and the six structures comprising the tomb and memorial chapel for Tokugawa Yoshinao are designated Important Cultural Properties.

== See also ==
- Kenchū-ji in Nagoya
