= Seto, Aichi =

Seto 瀬戸市
- City
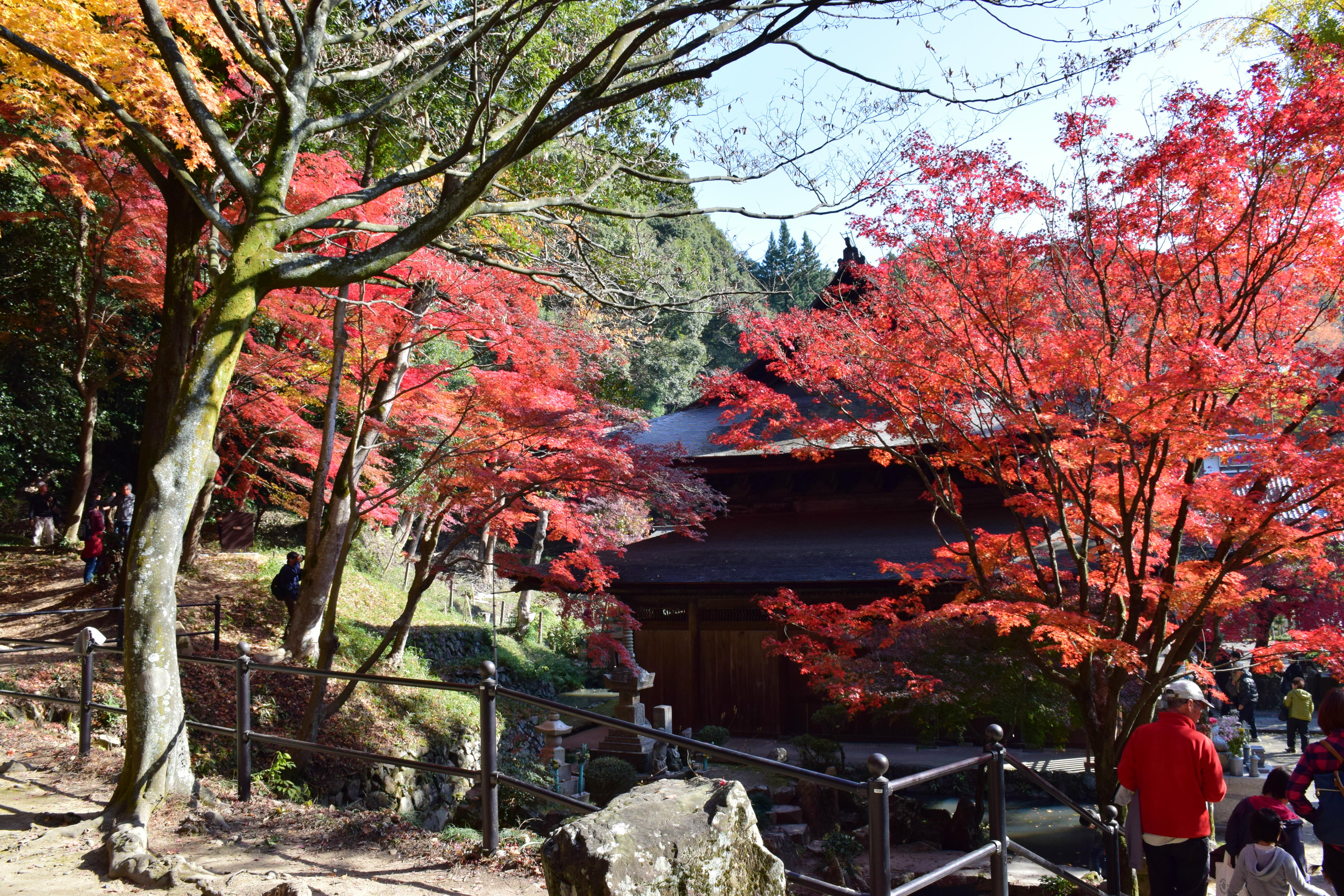
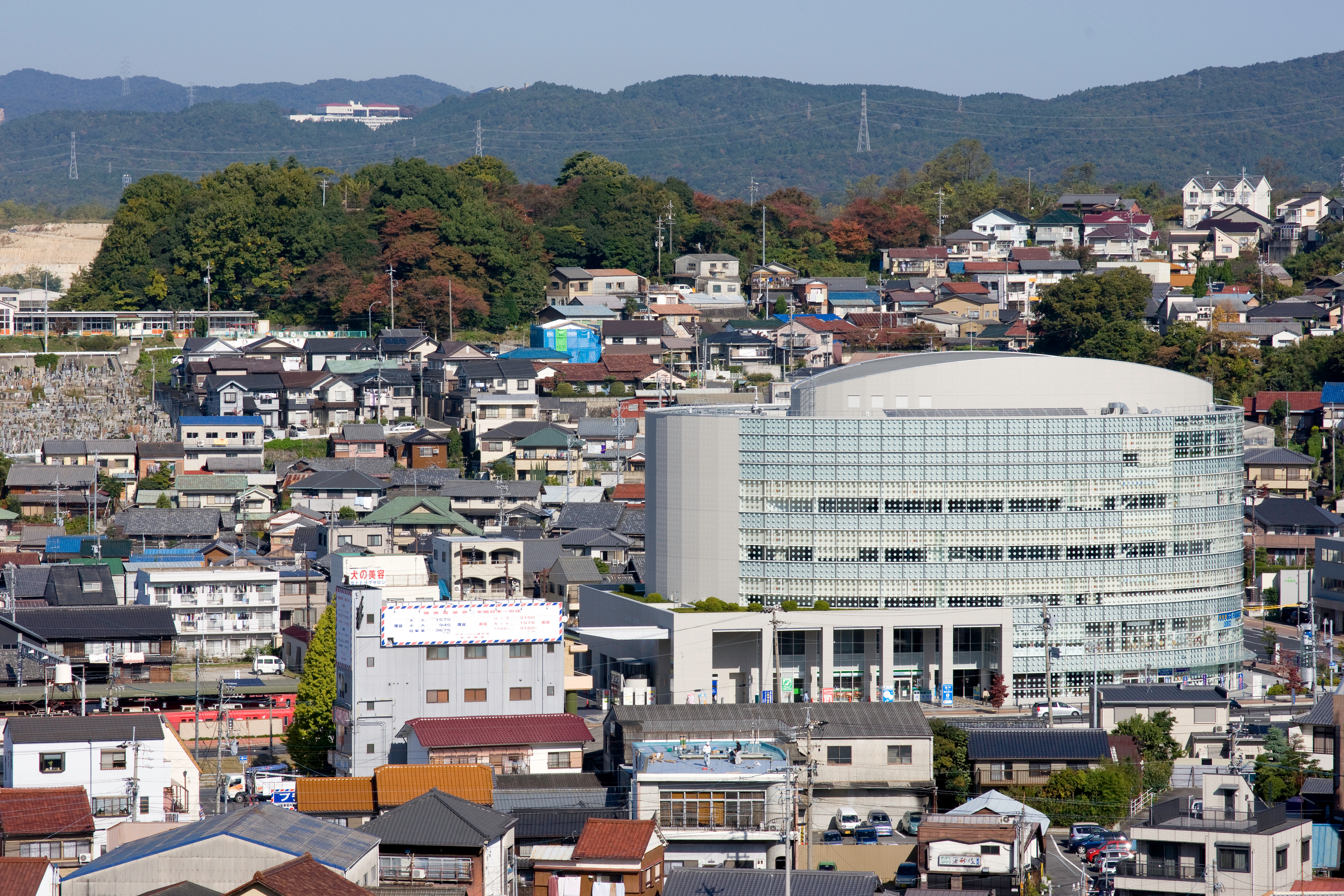
- Upper stage：Jōkō-ji temple in Seto; Lower stage：Skyline of Seto City

- Flag Seal

- Location of Seto in Aichi Prefecture

- Location within Japan
- Coordinates: 35°13′24.9″N 137°05′3.1″E
- Country: Japan
- Region: Chūbu (Tōkai)
- Prefecture: Aichi

Government
  - Mayor: Yasunori Ito

Area
  - Total: 111.40 km^{2} (43.01 sq mi)

Population (October 1, 2019)
  - Total: 127,659
  - Density: 1,146.0/km^{2} (2,968.0/sq mi)
- Time zone: UTC+9 (Japan Standard Time)
- Official tree: Ilex rotunda
- Official flower: Camellia
- Phone number: 0561-82-7111
- Address: 64-1 Oiwake-chō, Seto-shi, Aichi-ken 489-8701
- Website: Official website

Seto (瀬戸市, Seto-shi) is a city in Aichi Prefecture, Japan. As of 1 October 2019, the city had an estimated population of 127,659 in 56,573 households, and a population density of 1,146 persons per km^{2}. The total area was 111.40 square kilometres (43.01 sq mi).

== Geography ==
Seto is located in the hilly northern region of Aichi Prefecture, bordering Gifu Prefecture, approximately 35 minutes from Nagoya by way of the Meitetsu Seto Line. In English, the name of "Seto" translates to "the place where the river runs quickly". However, while there is a river in Seto, it is neither significantly large nor quick-moving. The city of Seto is famous for its pottery and ceramics, so much so that the generic word for ceramics in Japanese is setomono (瀬戸物). The main street along the river is lined with dozens of pottery shops. Every third Saturday and Sunday in September, there is a very large pottery festival called Setomono Matsuri(瀬戸物祭り) This festival attracts about 20,000 visitors from around Japan and abroad every year.

=== Climate ===
The city has a climate characterized by hot and humid summers, and relatively mild winters (Köppen climate classification Cfa). The average annual temperature in Seto is 14.8 °C. The average annual rainfall is 1810 mm with September as the wettest month. The temperatures are highest on average in August, at around 27.3 °C, and lowest in January, at around 3.1 °C.

=== Surrounding municipalities ===
Aichi Prefecture

- Kasugai
- Nagakute
- Nagoya (Moriyama-ku)
- Owariasahi
- Toyota

Gifu Prefecture

- Tajimi
- Toki

== Demographics ==
Per Japanese census data, the population of Seto has been increasing over the past 60 years.

Historical population
Year	Pop.	±%
1940	64,793	—
1950	68,415	+5.6%
1960	82,101	+20.0%
1970	92,681	+12.9%
1980	120,774	+30.3%
1990	126,340	+4.6%
2000	131,650	+4.2%
2010	132,240	+0.4%

== History ==
=== Feudal period ===
The area had been famous for its ceramics production since at least the Kamakura period.

=== Early modern period ===
During the Edo period, the area of modern Seto was controlled by the Owari Tokugawa of Owari Domain.

=== Late modern period ===
During the Meiji period, Seto village was organized in 1888 with the establishment of the modern municipalities system, becoming a town in 1892. After annexing the neighboring village of Akatsu in 1925, Seto was raised to city status on October 1, 1929.

Much of the city was destroyed by air raids in 1945 during World War II.

=== Contemporary history ===
In the postwar period, the city grew as a bedroom community for Nagoya and as a tourist designation. On March 25, 2005, Expo 2005 opened with its main site being in Nagakute and additional activity in Seto. The expo continued until September 25, 2005.

== Government ==
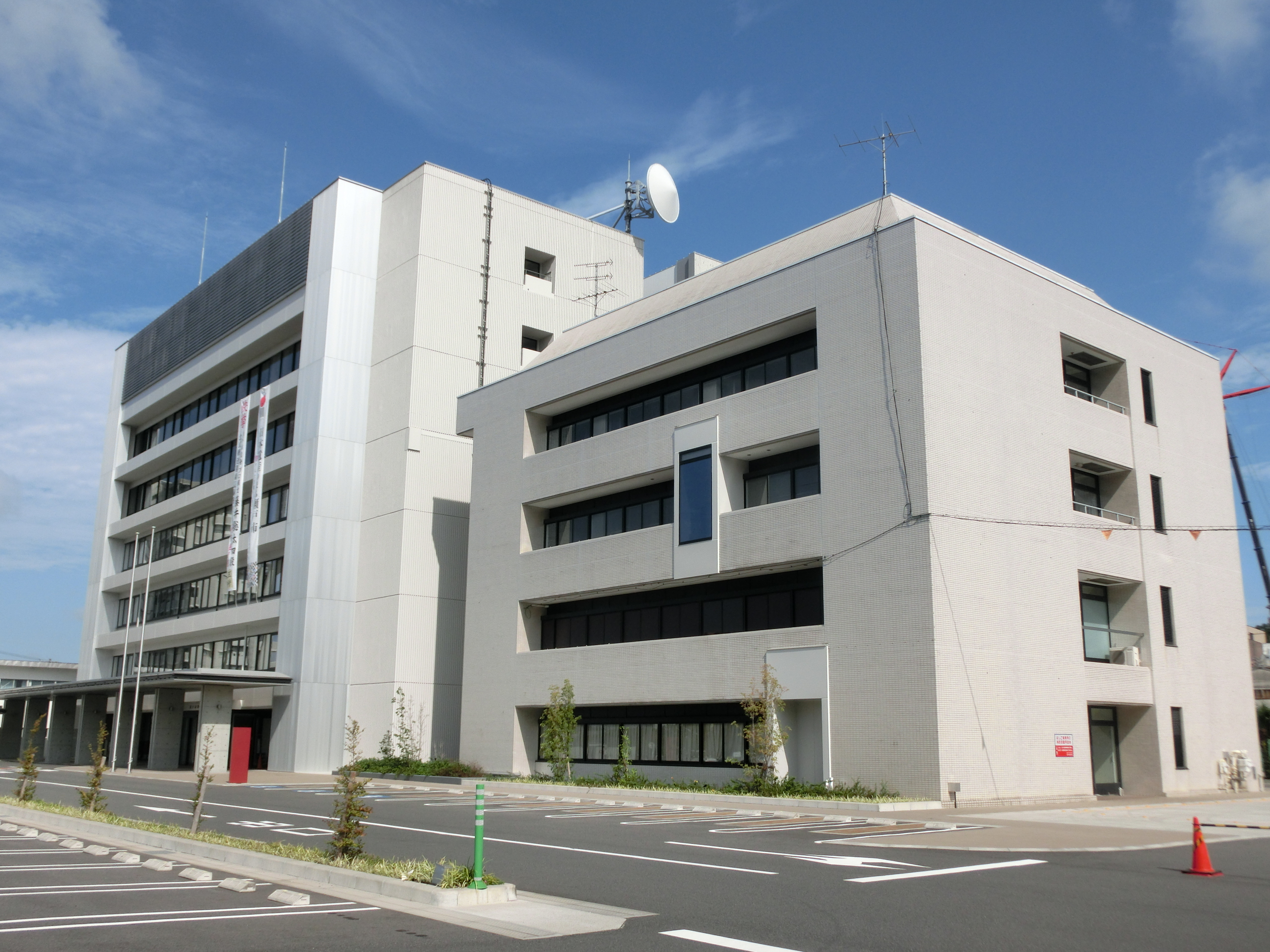
City hall

Seto has a mayor-council form of government with a directly elected mayor and a unicameral city legislature of 26 members. The city contributes two members to the Aichi Prefectural Assembly. In terms of national politics, the city is part of Aichi 6th district of the lower house of the Diet of Japan.

== Sister cities ==
Sister cities

- Limoges, Haute-Vienne, Nouvelle-Aquitaine, France, since November 18, 2003
- Nabeul, Nabeul Governorate, Tunisia, since November 8, 2004
- (South Korea) Icheon, Gyeonggi Province, Korea, since April 20, 2006

Friendship cities

- Jingdezhen, Jiangxi, China, since October 1996

== Economy ==
The economy of Seto remains dominated by ceramics, both for traditional works for private consumption, and also modern industrial ceramics for the electronics industry.

== Education ==
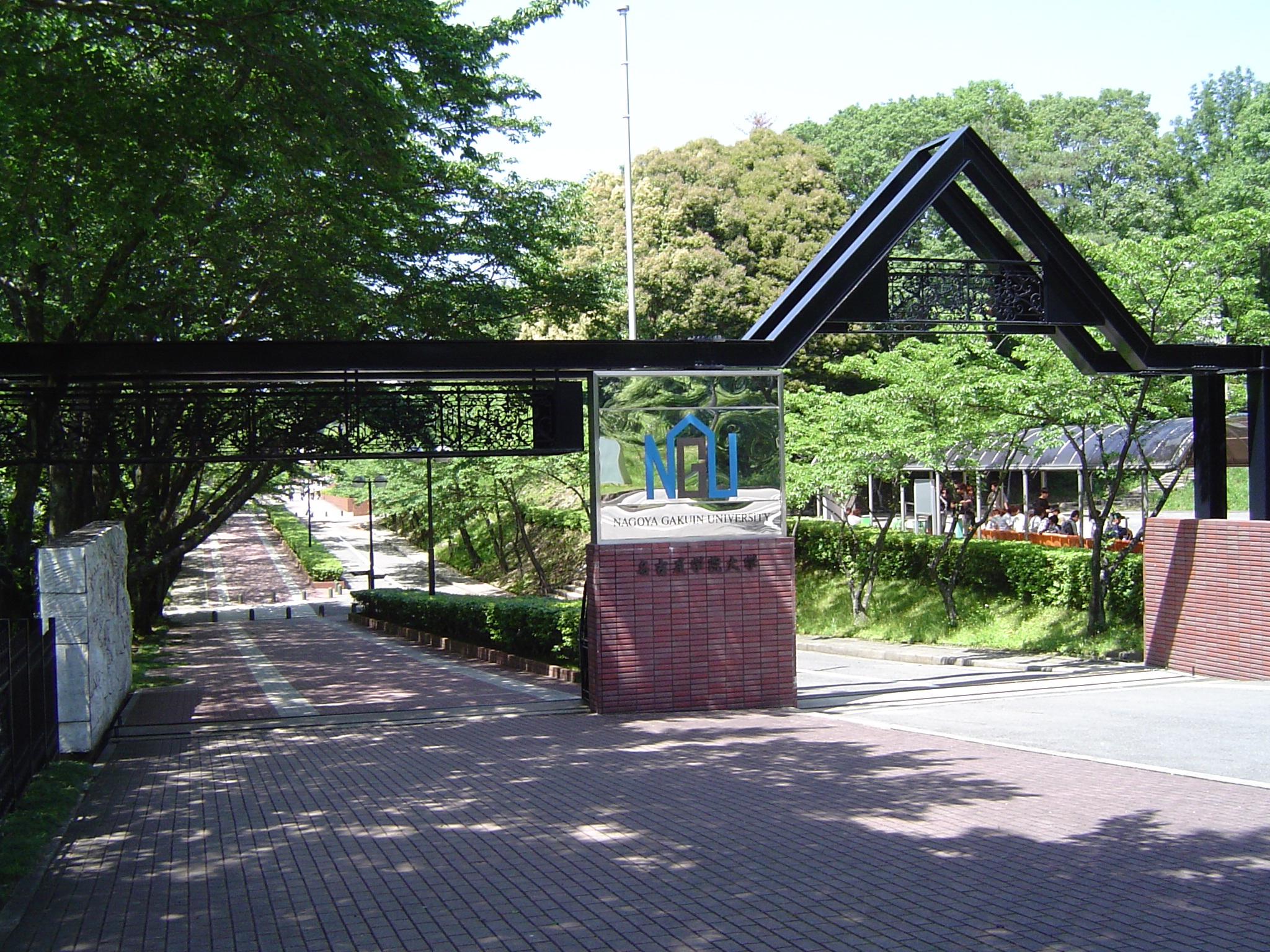
Nagoya Gakuin University Seto campus

=== University ===
- Nagoya Gakuin University – Seto campus

=== Schools ===
- Primary and secondary education

Seto has 20 public elementary schools and eight public junior high schools operated by the city government, and one private junior high school. The city has four public high schools operated by the Aichi Prefectural Board of Education. and two private high schools. The city operates one and the prefecture operates two special education schools for the handicapped.

=== International school ===
The Aichi Korean 7th Elementary School (愛知朝鮮第七初級学校) – North Korean school is located in Seto

== Transportation ==
Map of Meitetsu Seto Line

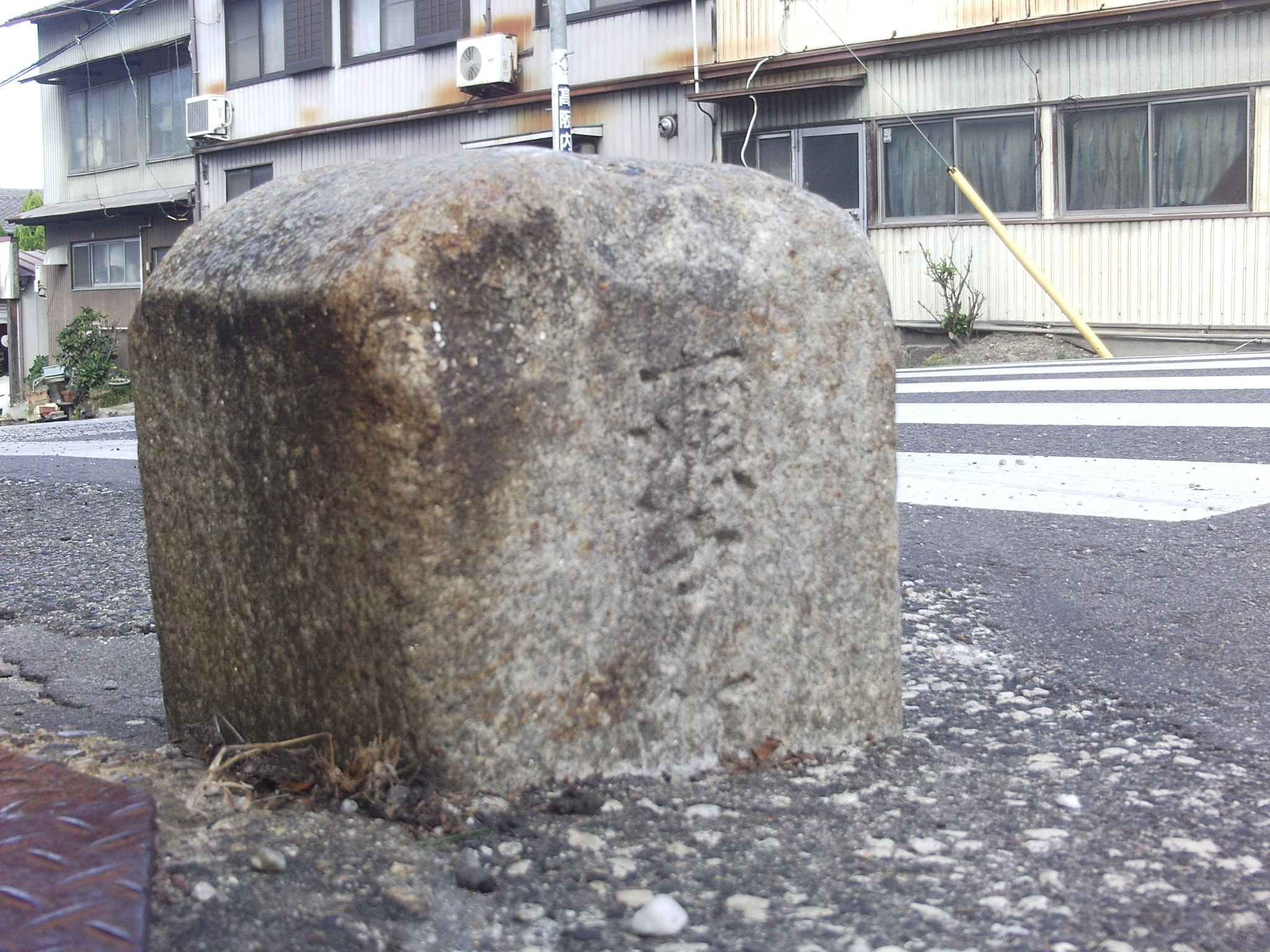
The Kilometre Zero of Seto

=== Railways ===
==== Conventional lines ====
Aichi Loop Railway

- Aichi Loop Line: - Yamaguchi – Setoguchi – Setoshi – Nakamizuno –

Meitetsu

- Seto Line: - Mizuno -Shin-Seto – Seto-Shiyakusho-mae – Owari Seto

=== Roads ===
==== Expressway ====
- Tōkai-Kanjō Expressway

==== Japan National Route ====
- National Route 155
- National Route 248
- National Route 363
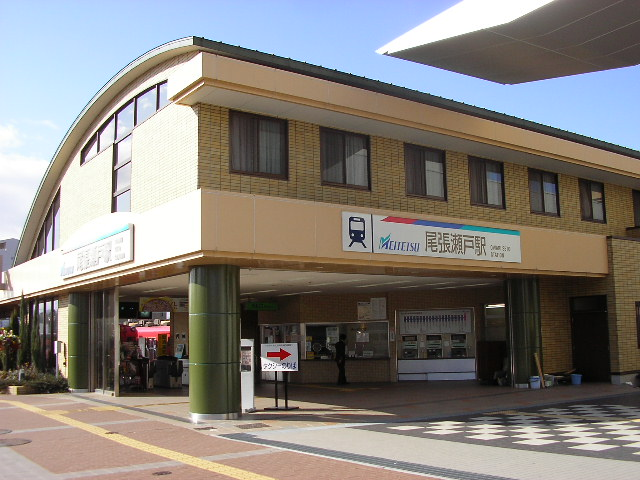
Owari Seto Station

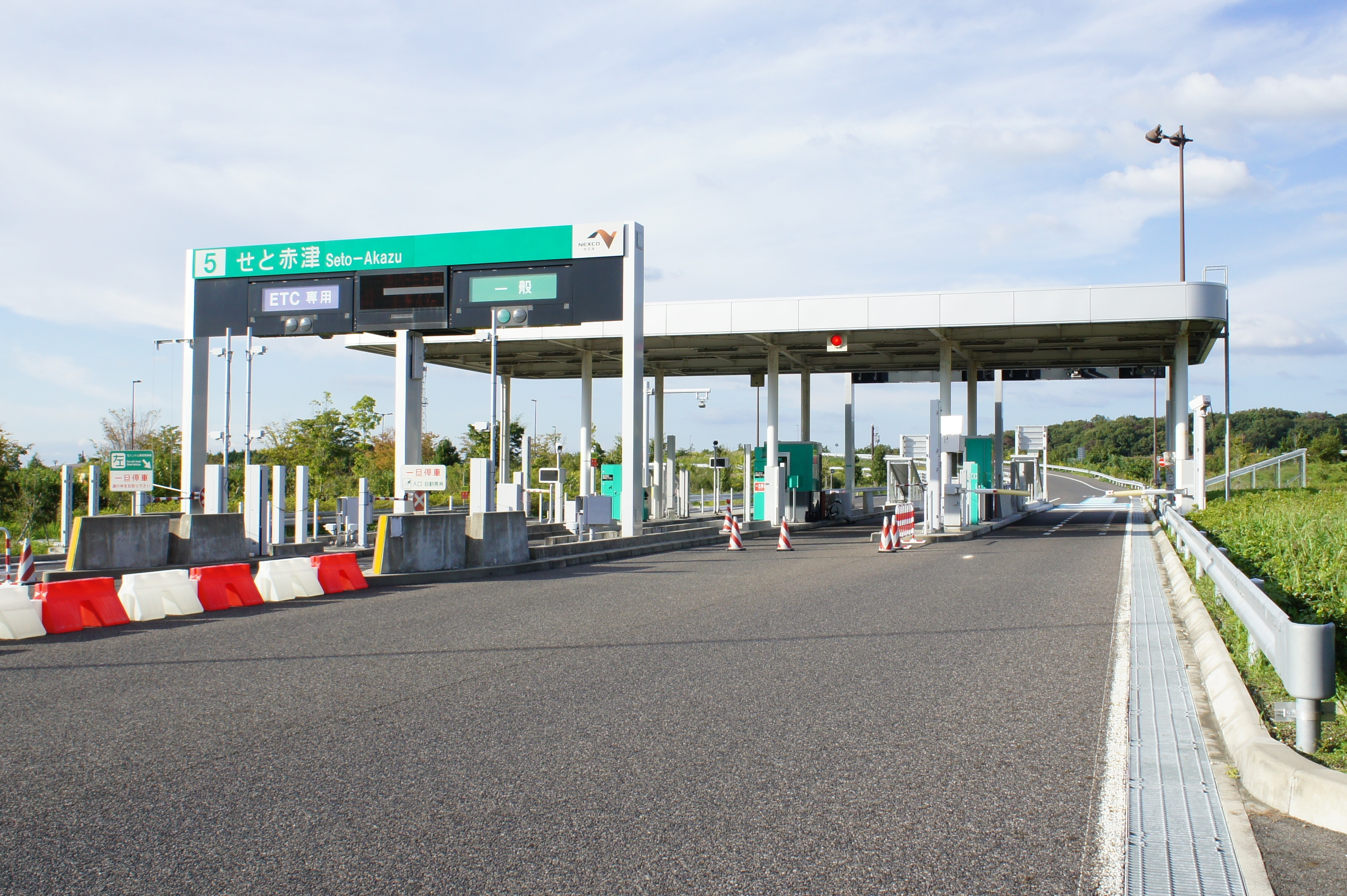
Seto-Akazu Interchange

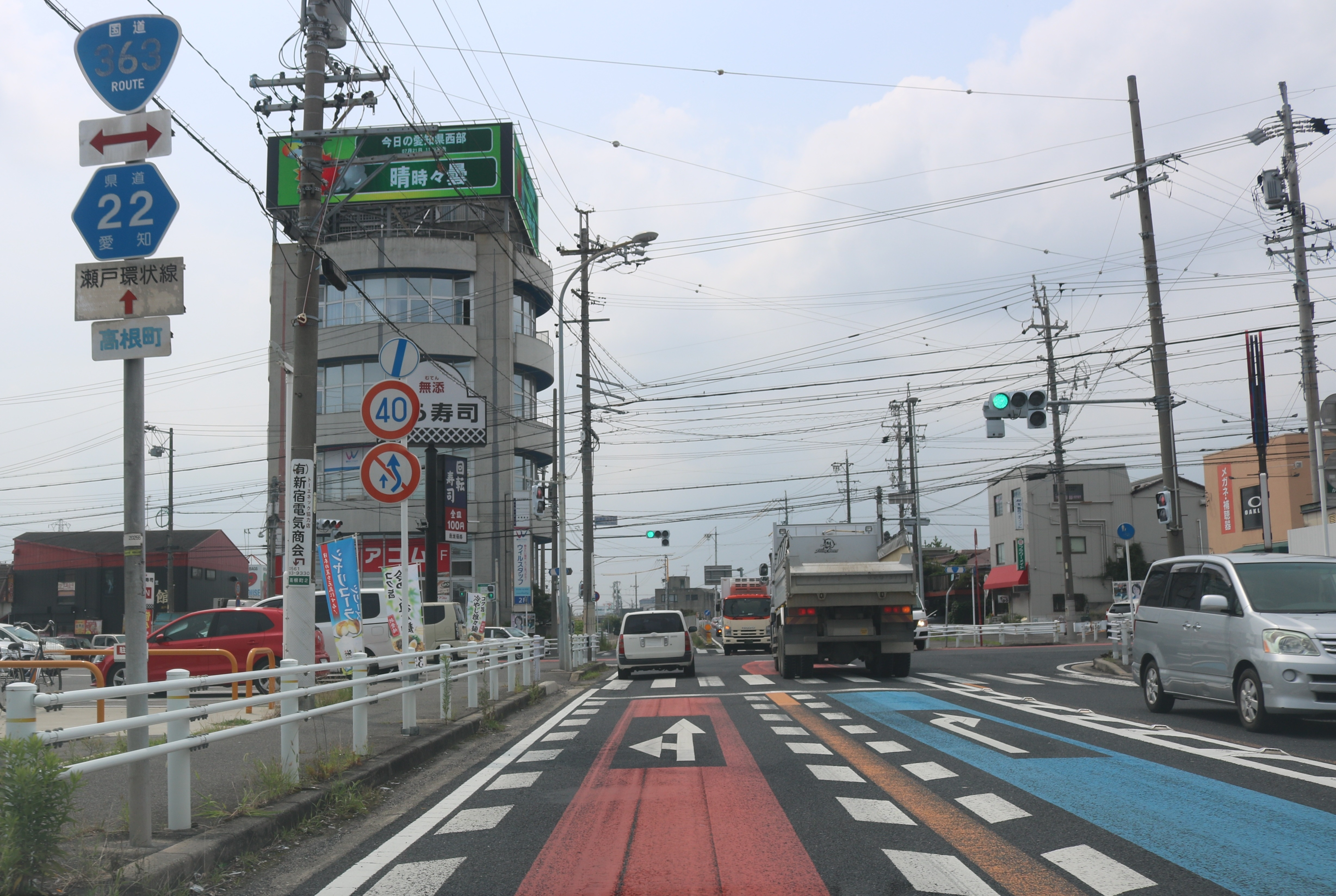
Japan National Route 363

== Local attractions ==
- Aichi Prefectural Ceramic Museum
- Jōkō-ji, Buddhist temple and mausoleum of Tokugawa Yoshinao of the Owari Domain.
- Setogura Museum
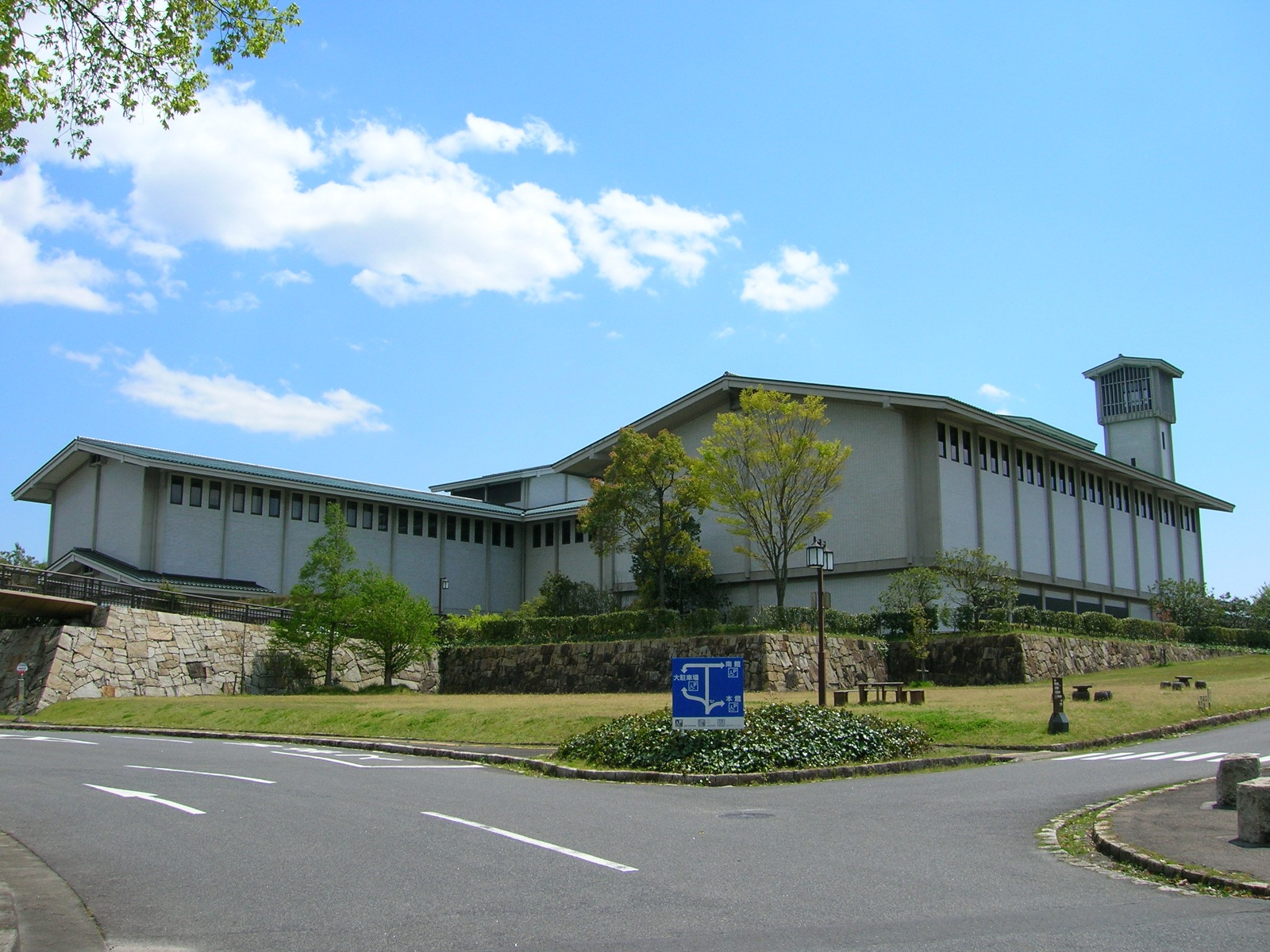
Aichi Prefectural Ceramic Museum

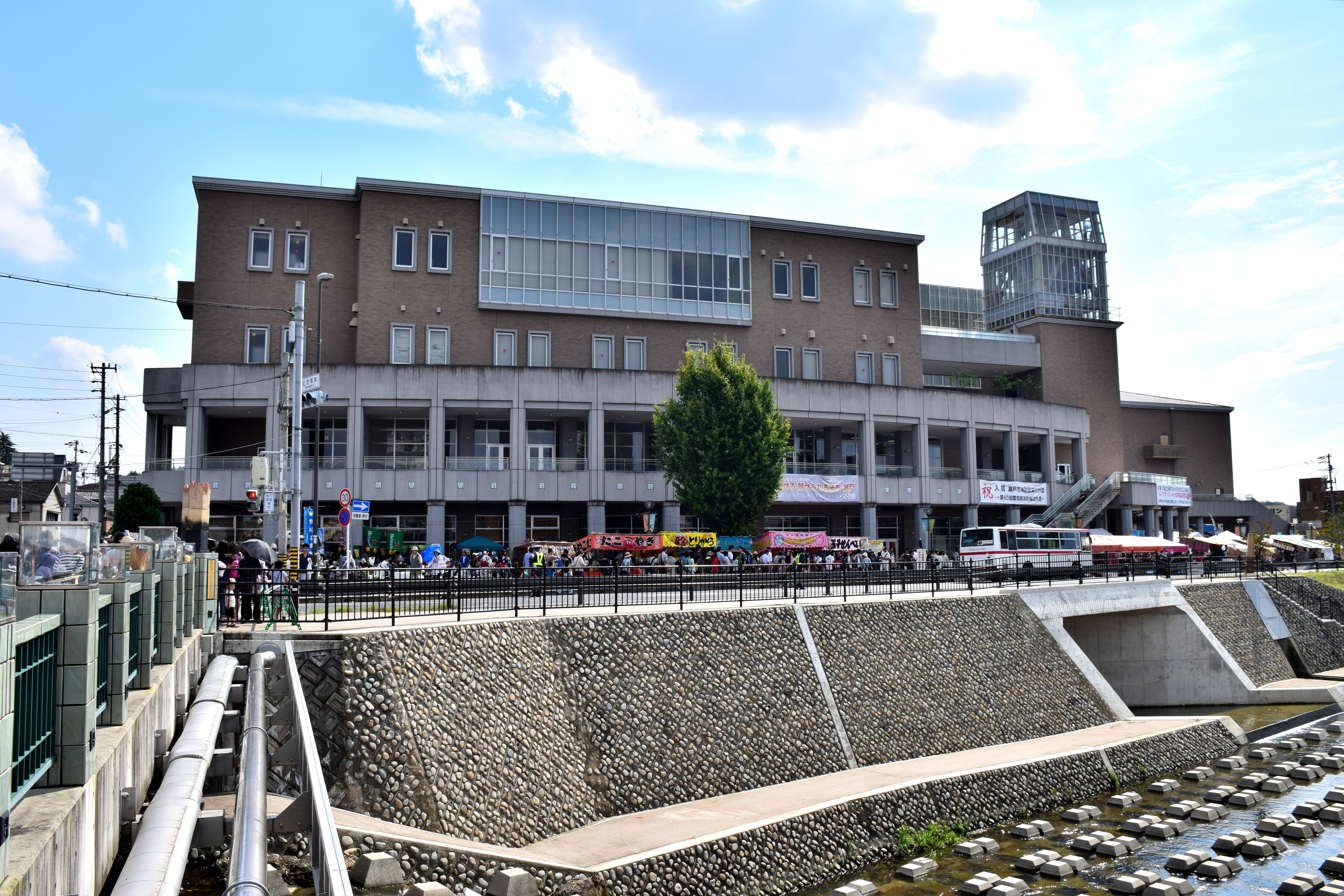
Setogura Museum

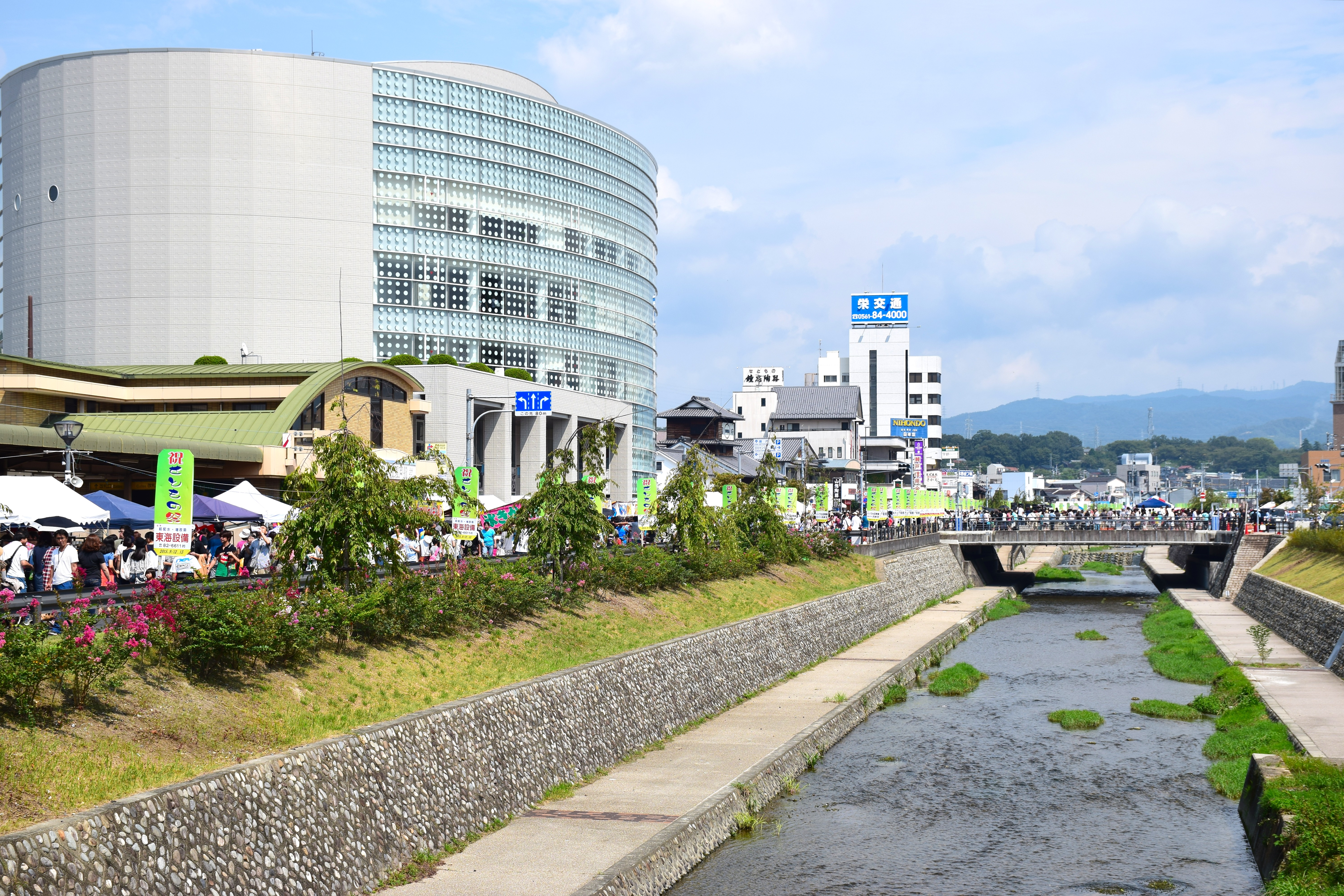
Setomono Festival

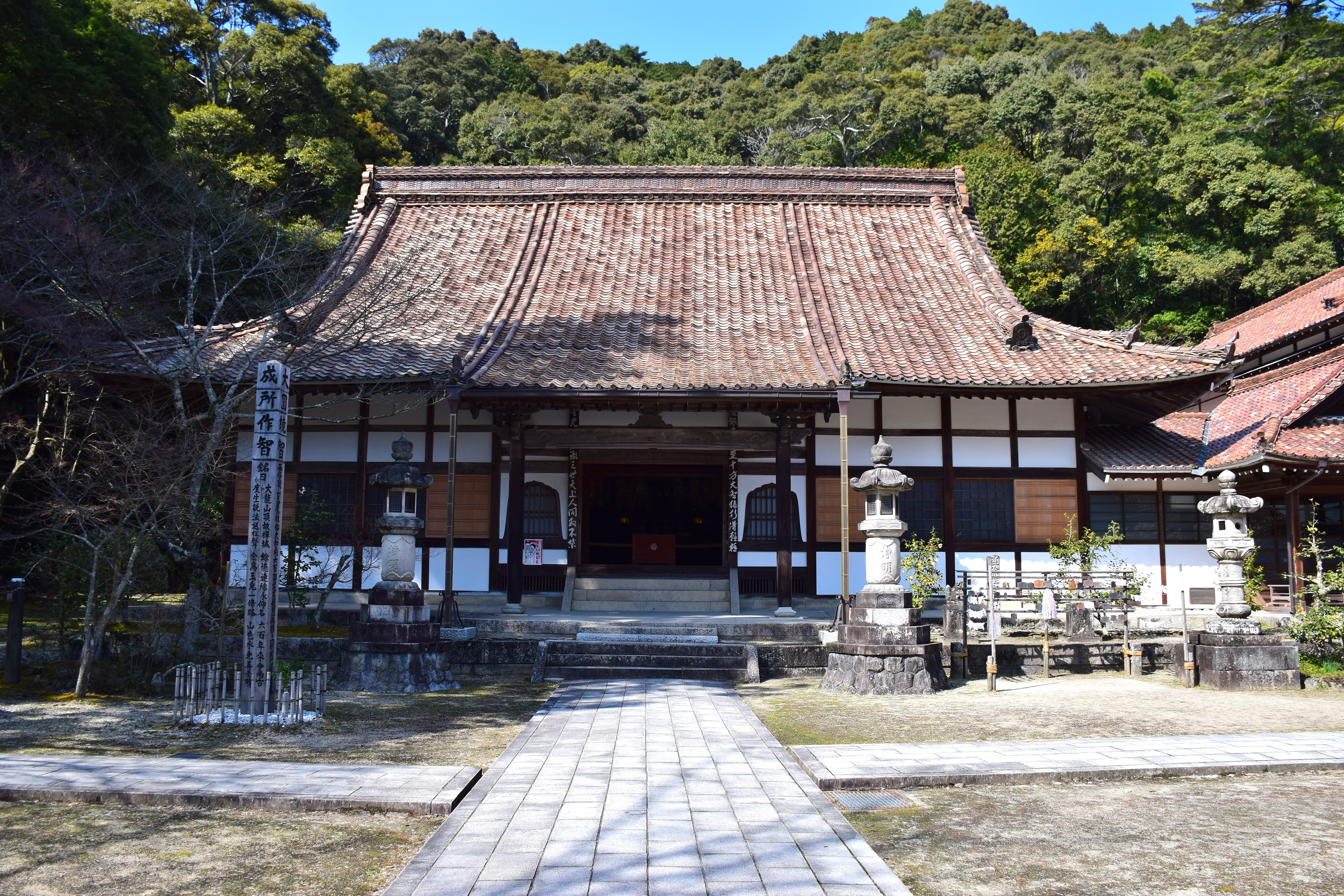
Unkō-ji

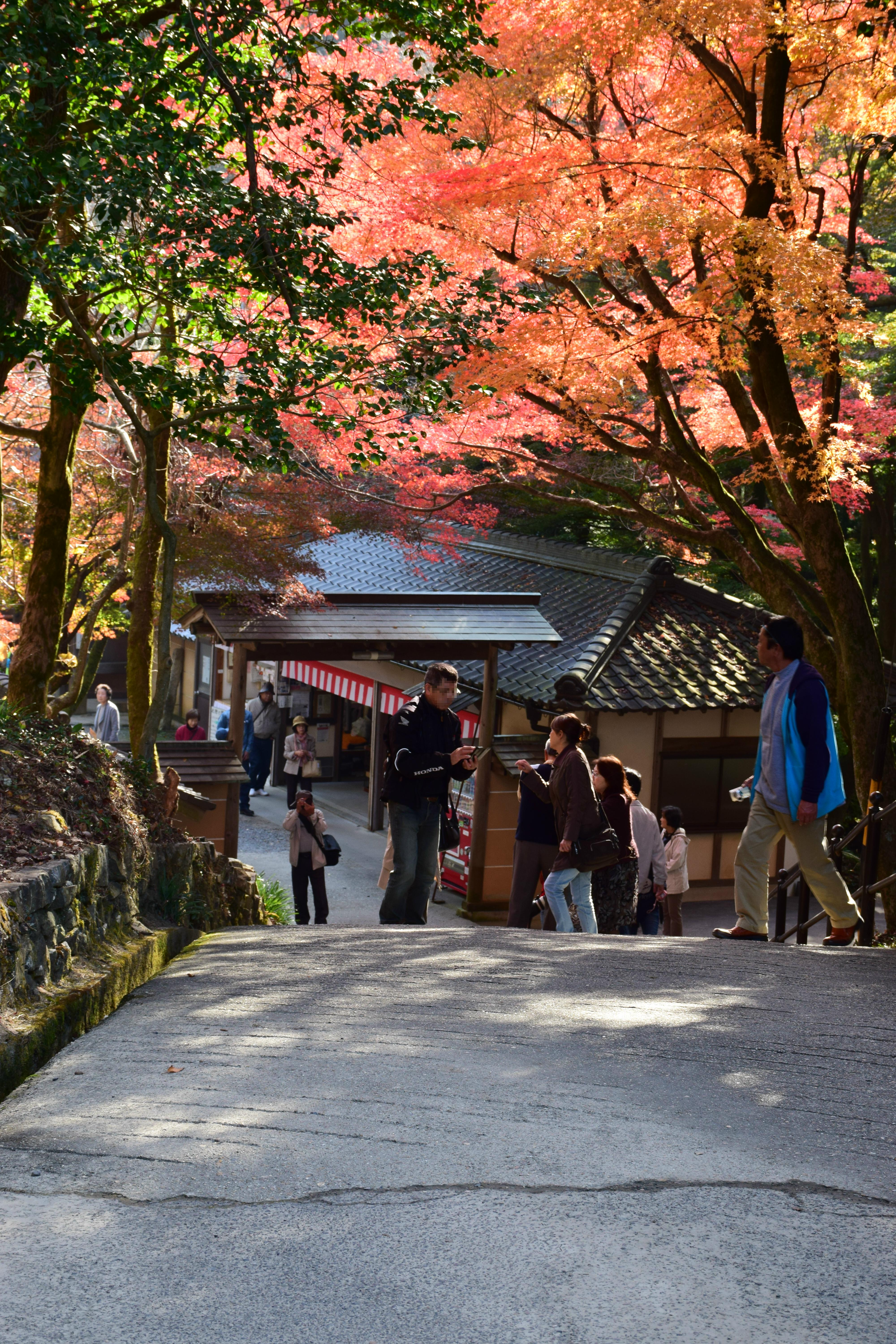
Jōkō-ji

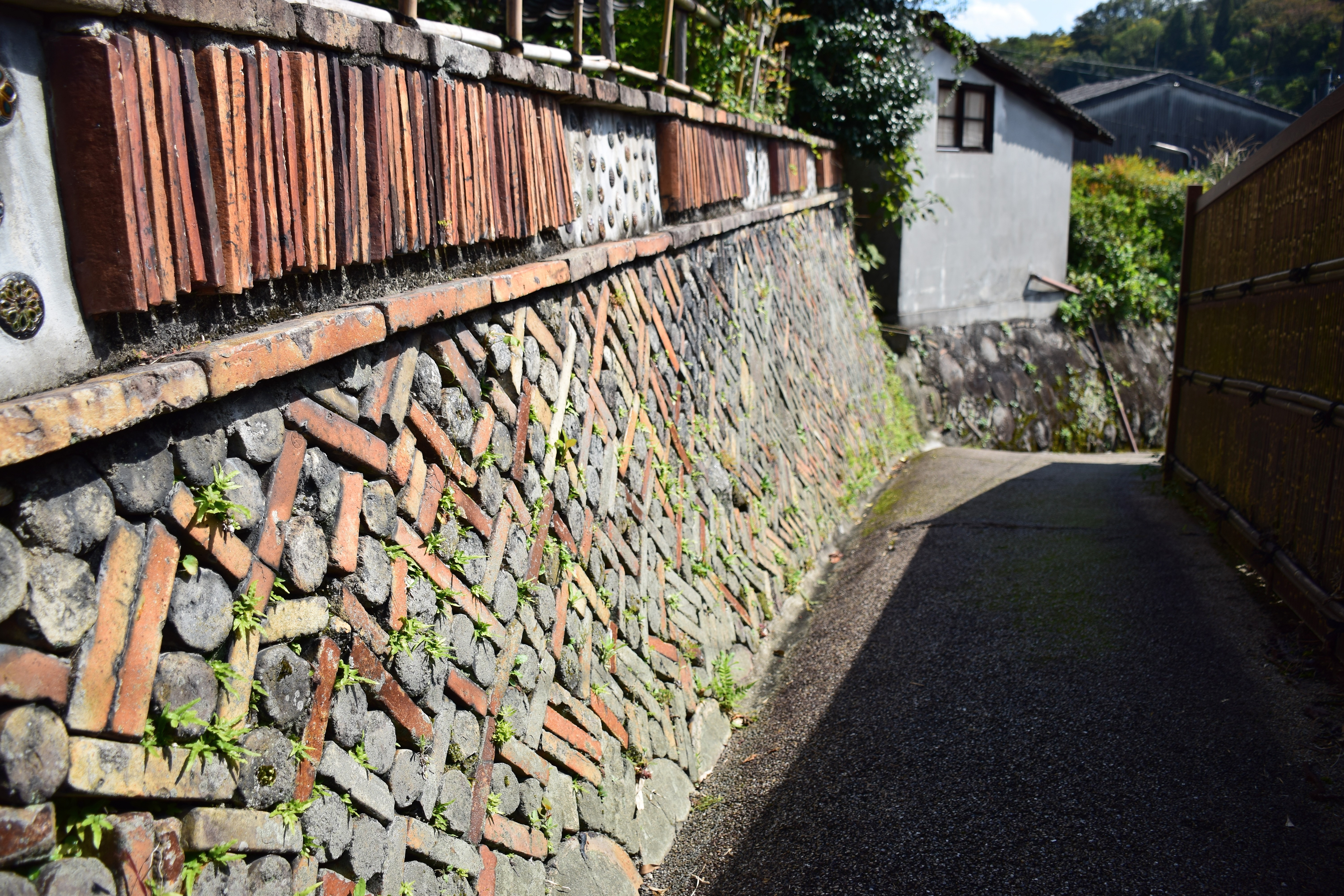
Kamagaki no Komichi

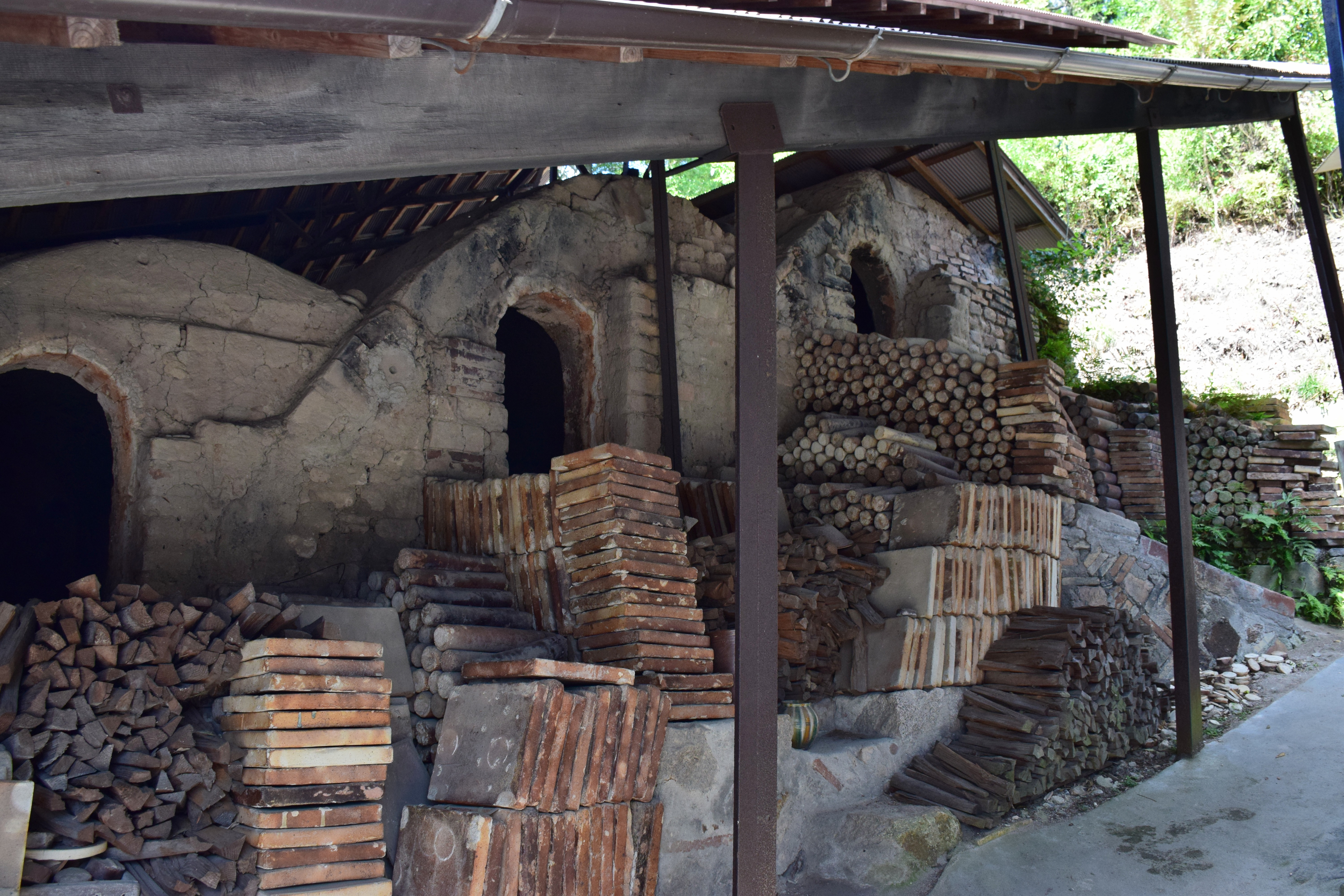
Hongyō kiln

== Notable people from Seto ==
- Sayaka Aoki, comedian
- Sōta Fujii, professional shogi player
- Toru Hasegawa,– professional soccer player
- Hayata Ito, professional baseball player
- Asaka Seto, actress
- Junji Suzuki, politician
- Manpei Takagi, actor
