= Kitano-Masuzuka Station =

Railway station in Okazaki, Aichi Prefecture, Japan

Kitano-Masuzuka Station 北野桝塚駅
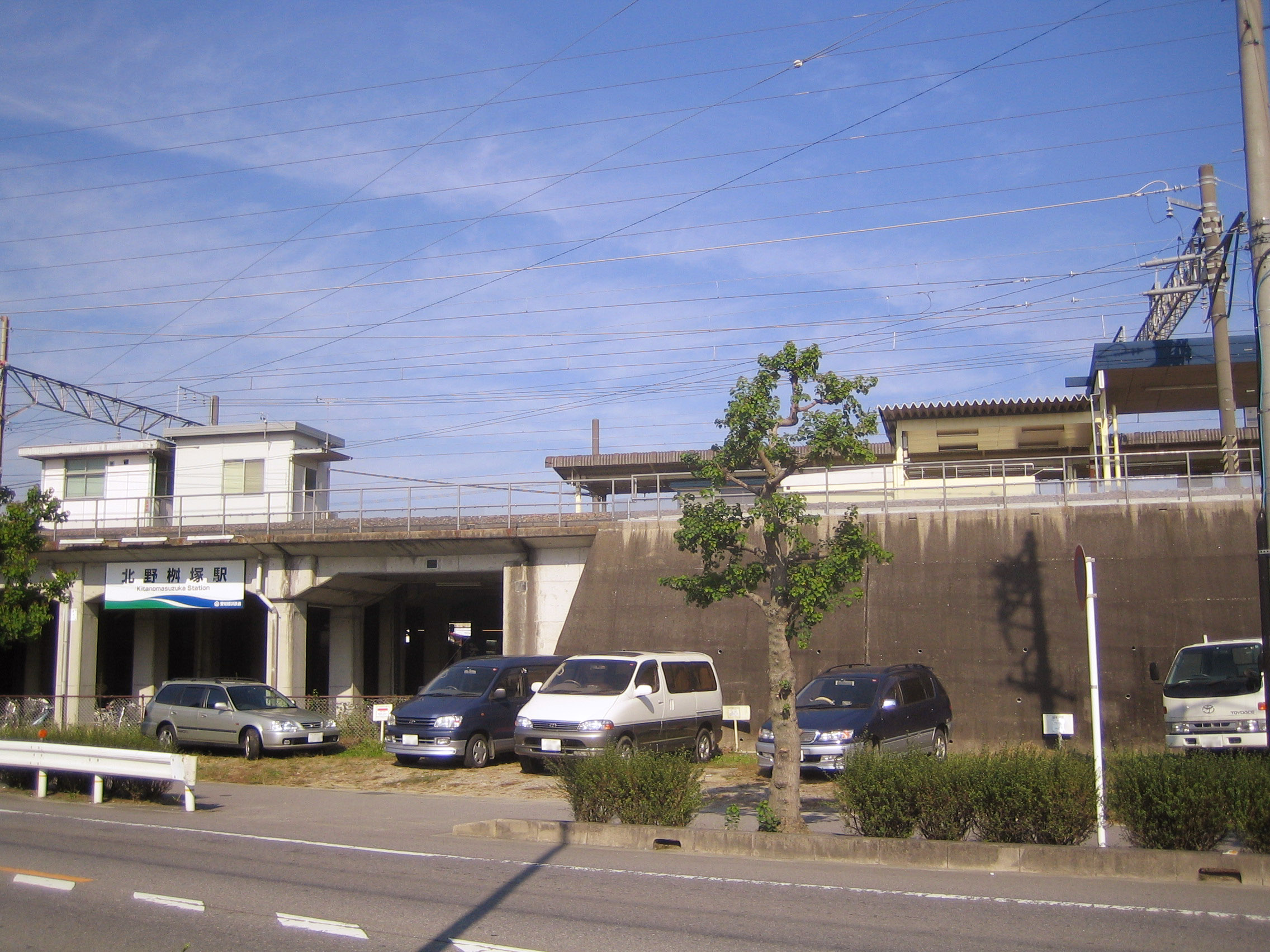
- Kitano-Masuzuka Station in October 2006

General information
- Location: Nibanwake-68 Kitanochō, Okazaki-shi, Aichi-ken 444-0951; Japan
- Coordinates: 34.9964°N 137.139°E
- Operator: Aichi Loop Railway
- Line: ■ Aichi Loop Line
- Distance: 8.7 kilometers from Okazaki
- Platforms: 2 side platforms

Other information
- Status: Staffed
- Station code: 06
- Website: Official website

History
- Opened: October 1, 1970

Passengers
- FY2017: 1068 daily
Location
- Location within Aichi Prefecture Location within Japan

Kitano-Masuzuka Station (北野桝塚駅, Kitano-Masuzuka-eki) is a railway station in the city of Okazaki, Aichi Prefecture, Japan, operated by the third sector Aichi Loop Railway Company.

== Lines ==
Kitano-Masuzuka Station is served by the Aichi Loop Line, and is located 8.7 kilometers from the starting point of the line at Okazaki.

== Station layout ==
The station has a single elevated island platform serving two tracks, with the station building located underneath. The station building has automated ticket machines, TOICA automated turnstiles and is staffed.

=== Platforms ===
1	■ Aichi Loop Line	for Mikawa-Toyota and Okazaki
2	■ Aichi Loop Line	for Kōzōji

== Adjacent stations ==
«	Service	»
Aichi Loop Line
Daimon	-	Mikawa-Kamigō

== Station history ==
Kitano-Masuzuka Station was opened on October 1, 1970, as a freight station on the Japanese National Railways (JNR), primarily to support the operations of nearby factories of Toyota Motors and its affiliated companies. Scheduled passenger operations began from April 26, 1976. Freight operations were discontinued from January 1, 1985. With the privatization of JNR on April 1, 1987, the station came under the control of JR Central. The station was transferred to the Aichi Loop Railway Company on January 31, 1988. The station was expanded with the addition of another track on December 23, 2001, in preparation for the 2005 Aichi World Exposition.

== Passenger statistics ==
In fiscal 2017, the station was used by an average of 1068 passengers daily.

== Surrounding area ==
- Aichi Loop Railway Co Ltd head office
- Aichi Loop Railway rail yard

== See also ==
- List of railway stations in Japan
