= Ekaku Station =

Railway station in Toyota, Aichi Prefecture, Japan

Ekaku Station 永覚駅
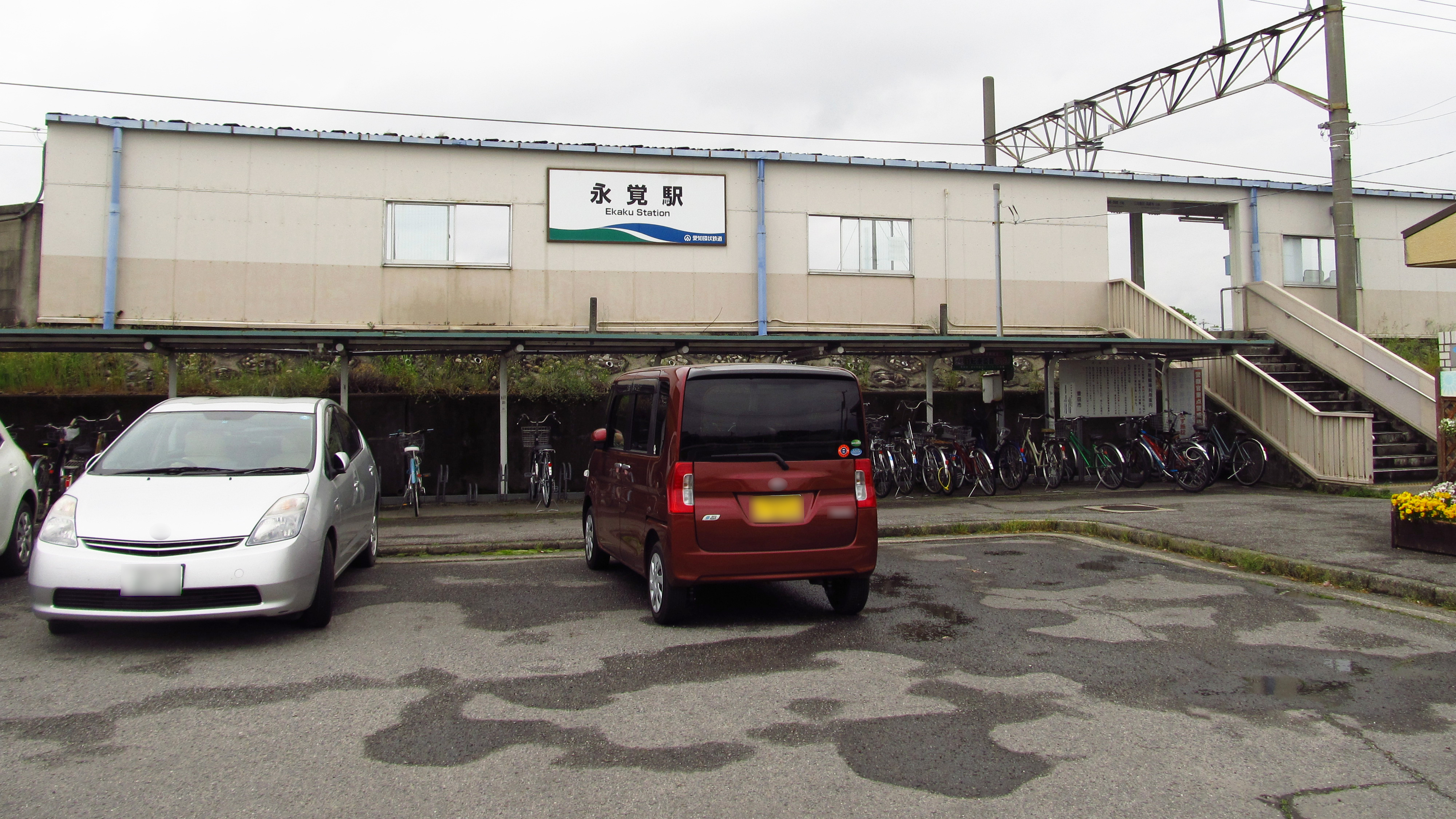
- Ekaku Station, May 2015

General information
- Location: Ekaku-cho 5-chome, Toyota-shi, Aichi-ken 470-1205; Japan
- Coordinates: 35.0272°N 137.1389°E
- Operator: Aichi Loop Railway
- Line: ■ Aichi Loop Line
- Distance: 12.4 kilometers from Okazaki
- Platforms: 1 side platform

Other information
- Status: Unstaffed
- Station code: 08
- Website: Official website

History
- Opened: April 26, 1976

Passengers
- FY2017: 571 daily
Location
- Location within Aichi Prefecture Location within Japan

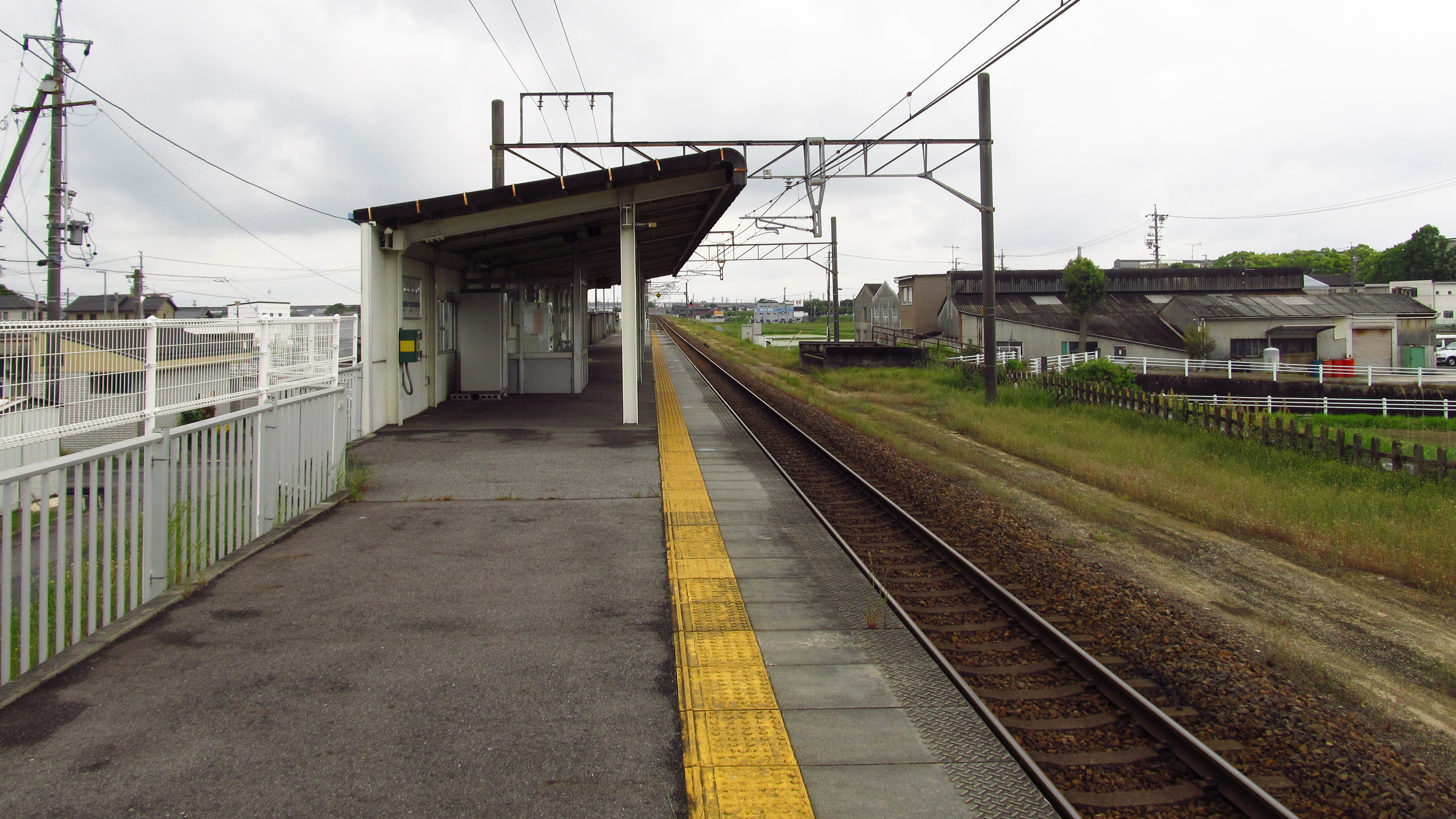
Platform in May 2015

Ekaku Station (永覚駅, Ekaku-eki) is a railway station in the city of Toyota, Aichi Prefecture, Japan, operated by the third sector Aichi Loop Railway Company.

== Lines ==
Ekaku Station is served by the Aichi Loop Line, and is located 12.4 kilometers from the starting point of the line at Okazaki.

== Station layout ==
The station has one side platform serving a single bidirectional track. There is no station building, but a roofed enclosure on the platform itself. The station building has automated ticket machines, TOICA automated turnstiles and is unattended.

== Adjacent stations ==
«	Service	»
Aichi Loop Line
Mikawa-Kamigō	-	Suenohara

== Station history ==
Ekaku Station was opened on April 26, 1976 as a passenger station on the Japan National Railways (JNR) Okata Line connecting Okazaki with Shin-Toyota. At the time, the station had a single side platform. With the privatization of the JNR on April 1, 1987, the station came under control of JR Central. The station was transferred to the third sector Aichi Loop Railway Company on January 31, 1988.

== Passenger statistics ==
In fiscal 2017, the station was used by an average of 571 passengers daily.

== Surrounding area ==
- Toyota Kamigō factory

== See also ==
- List of railway stations in Japan
