= Mikawa-Kamigō Station =

Railway station in Toyota, Aichi Prefecture, Japan

Mikawa-Kamigō Station 三河上郷駅
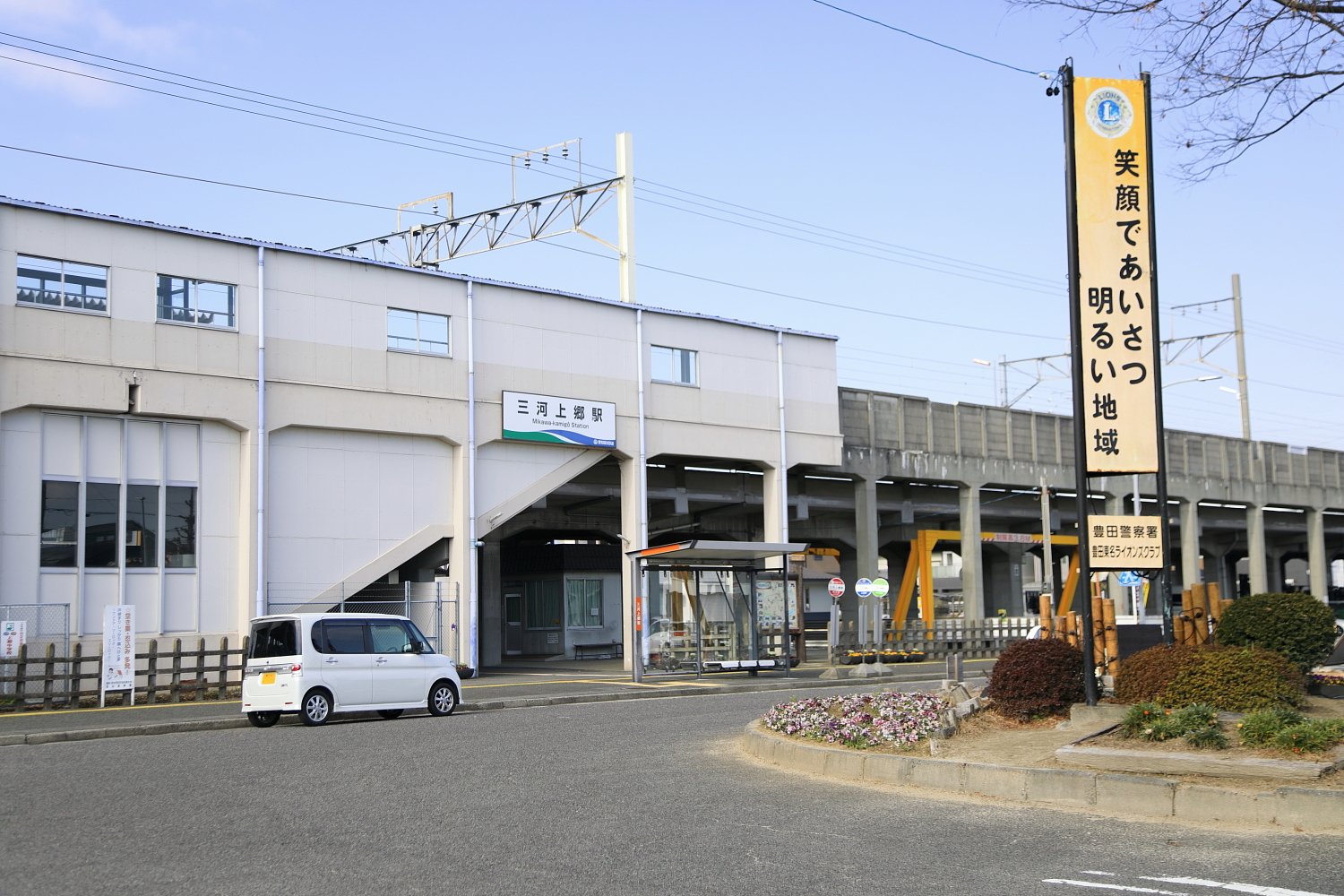
- Mikawa-Kamigō Station in February 2019

General information
- Location: 5-18-1 Kamigō-cho, Toyota-shi, Aichi-ken 470-1218; Japan
- Coordinates: 35.0122°N 137.1329°E
- Operator: Aichi Loop Railway
- Line: ■ Aichi Loop Line
- Distance: 10.7 kilometers from Okazaki
- Platforms: 2 side platforms

Other information
- Status: Staffed
- Station code: 07
- Website: Official website

History
- Opened: April 26, 1976

Passengers
- FY2017: 1875 daily
Location
- Location within Aichi Prefecture Location within Japan

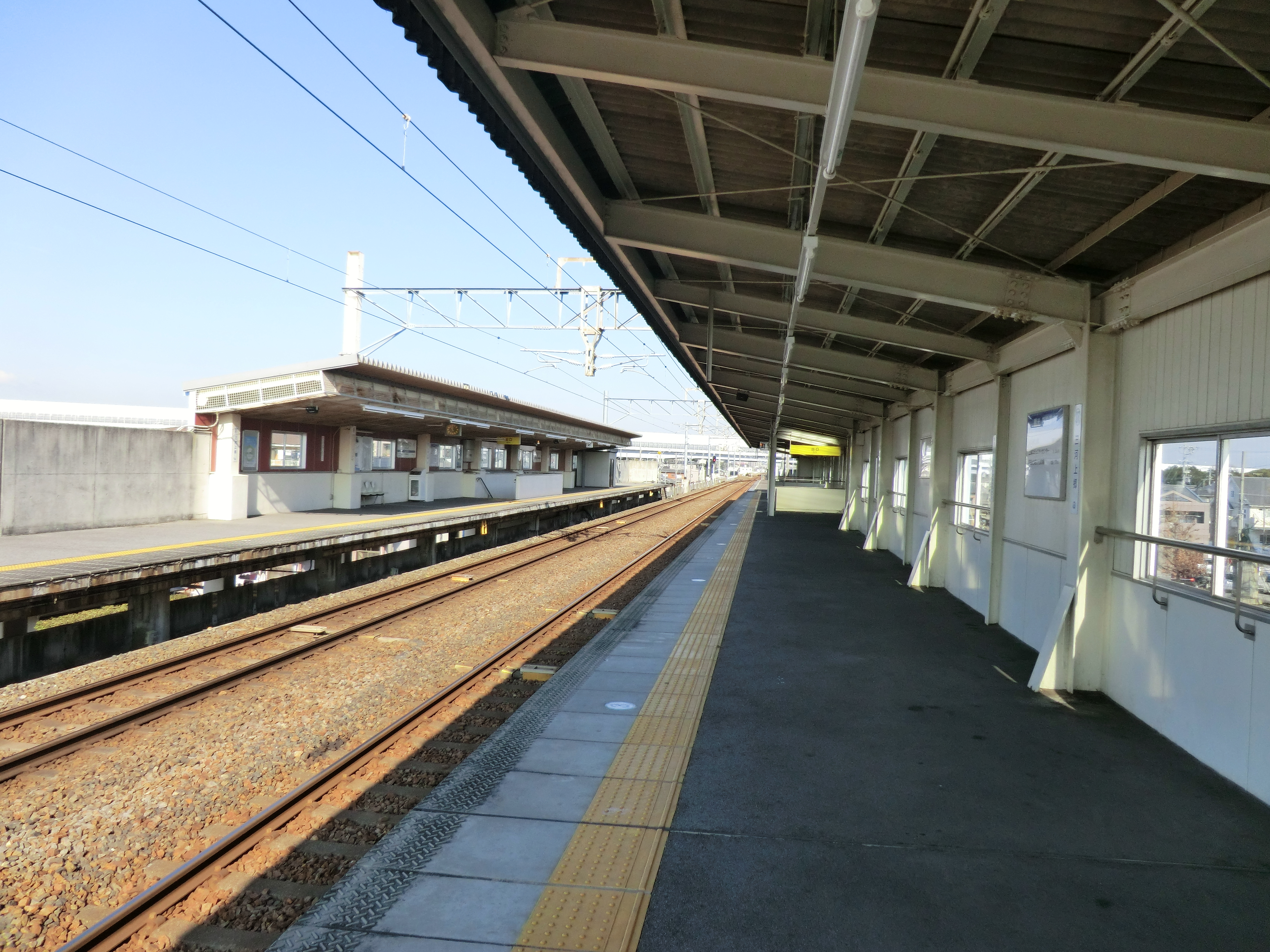
Platforms in January 2013

Mikawa-Kamigō Station (三河上郷駅, Mikawa-Kamigō-eki) is a railway station in the city of Toyota, Aichi Prefecture, Japan, operated by the third sector Aichi Loop Railway Company.

== Lines ==
Mikawa-Kamigō Station is served by the Aichi Loop Line, and is located 10.7 kilometers from the starting point of the line at Okazaki.

== Station layout ==
The station has two elevated side platforms, with the station building located underneath. However, the platforms are not matched. Platform 1 can handle a full train of 10 carriages, but Platform 2 is short and can accommodate only four carriages in length. The station building has automated ticket machines, TOICA automated turnstiles and is staffed.

=== Platforms ===
1	■ Aichi Loop Line	For Kitano-Masuzuka and Okazaki
2	■ Aichi Loop Line	For Ekaku and Kōzōji

== Adjacent stations ==
«	Service	»
Aichi Loop Line
Kitano-Masuzuka	-	Ekaku

== Station history ==
Mikawa-Kamigō Station was opened on April 26, 1976 as a passenger station on the Japan National Railways (JNR) Okata Line connecting Okazaki with Shin-Toyota. At the time, the station had a single side platform. With the privatization of the JNR on April 1, 1987, the station came under control of the JR-Tokai. The station was transferred to the third sector Aichi Loop Railway Company on January 31, 1988.

== Passenger statistics ==
In fiscal 2017, the station was used by an average of 1875 passengers daily.

== Surrounding area ==
- Kamigō Community Center
- Toyota Technical High School

== See also ==
- List of railway stations in Japan
