= Tagata Shrine =

Shinto shrine

Coordinates: 35°18′57″N 136°56′28″E

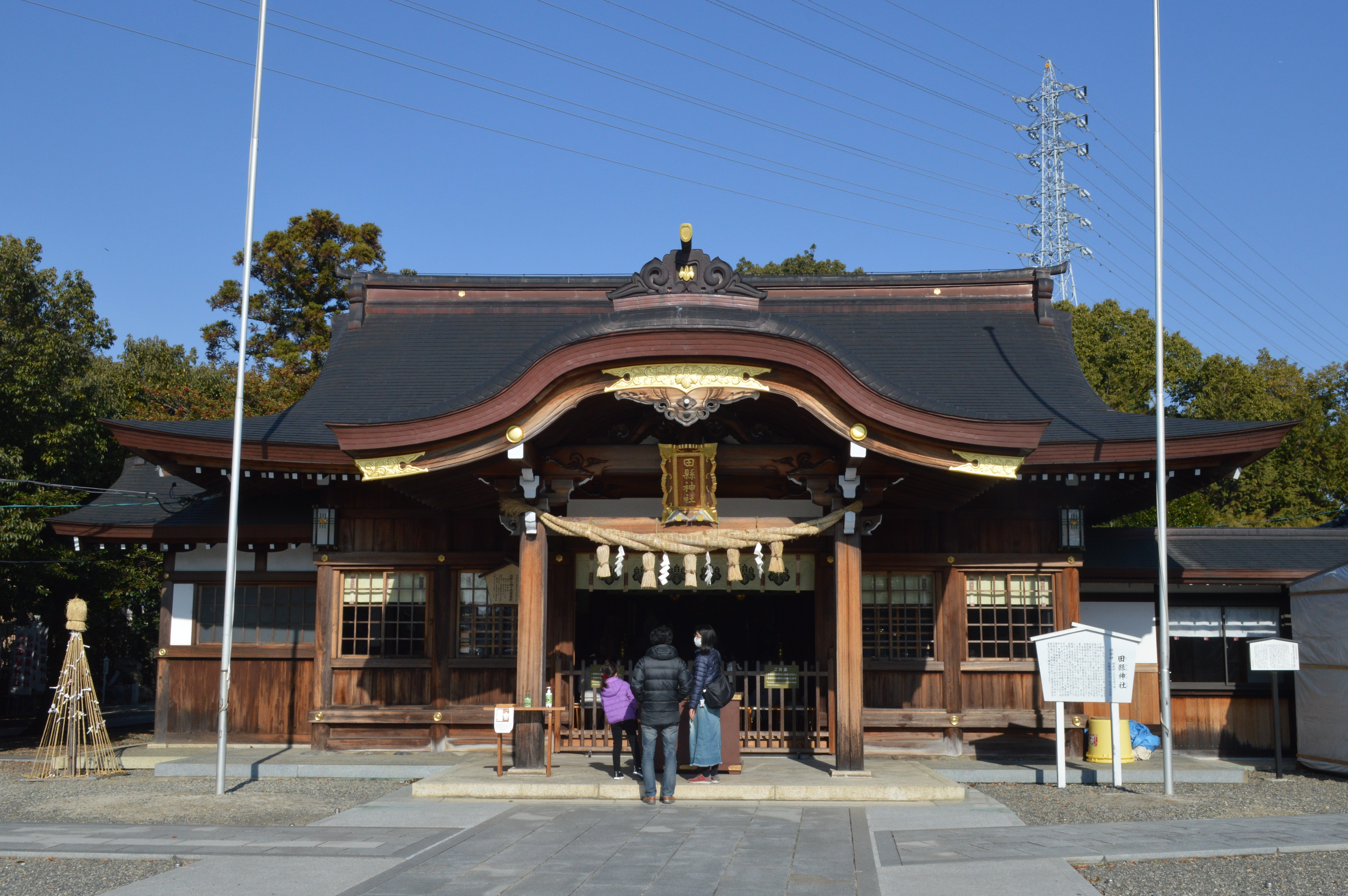

Religion
- Affiliation: Shinto

Location
- Interactive map of Tagata Shrine

Tagata Shrine (Japanese: 田縣神社, Hepburn: Tagata Jinja) is a Shinto shrine located in Komaki, Aichi Prefecture. It is famous for its Hōnensai, popularly referred to as the Penis Festival, which is held annually on March 15.

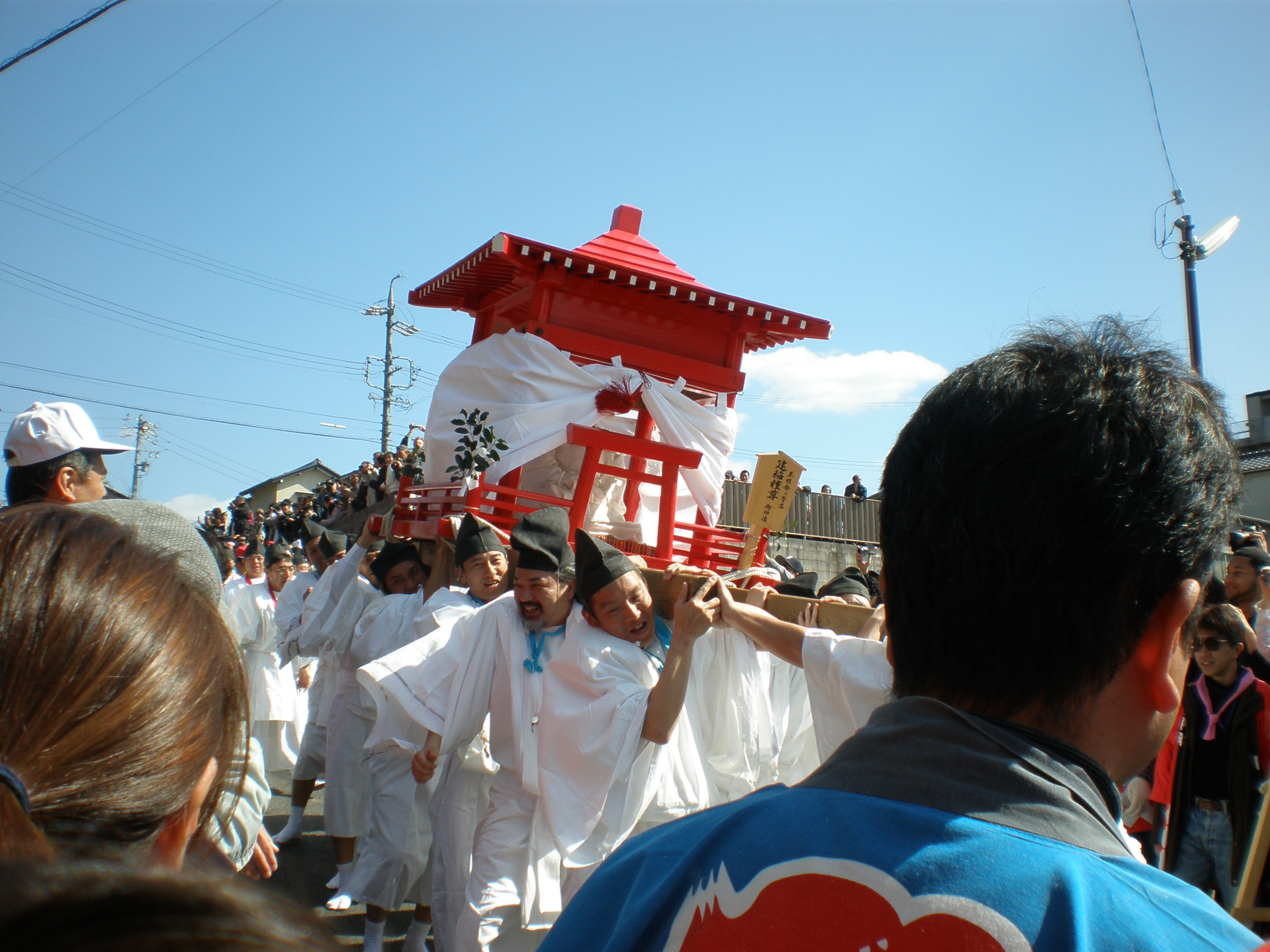
Hōnensai

== Gallery ==
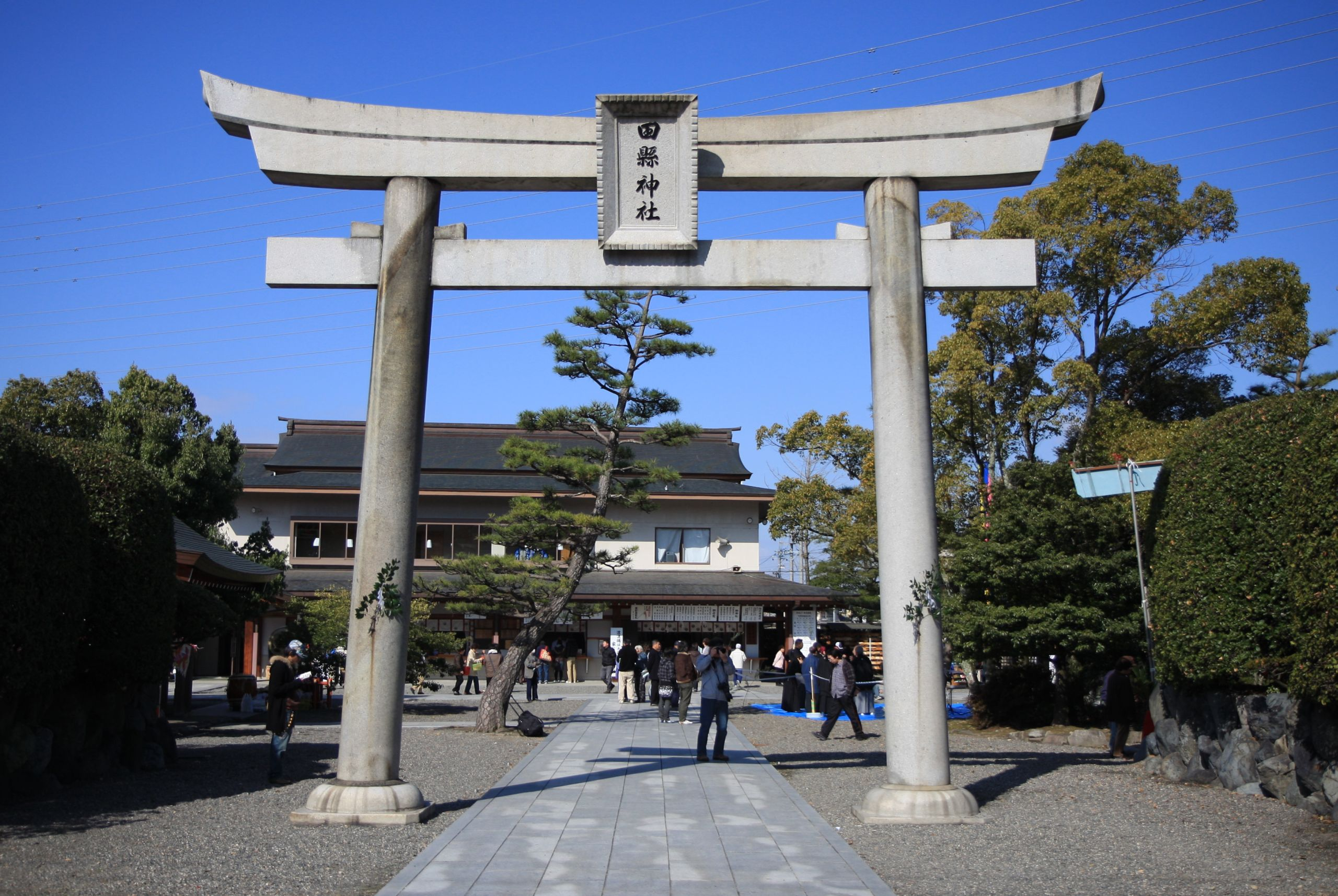
torii

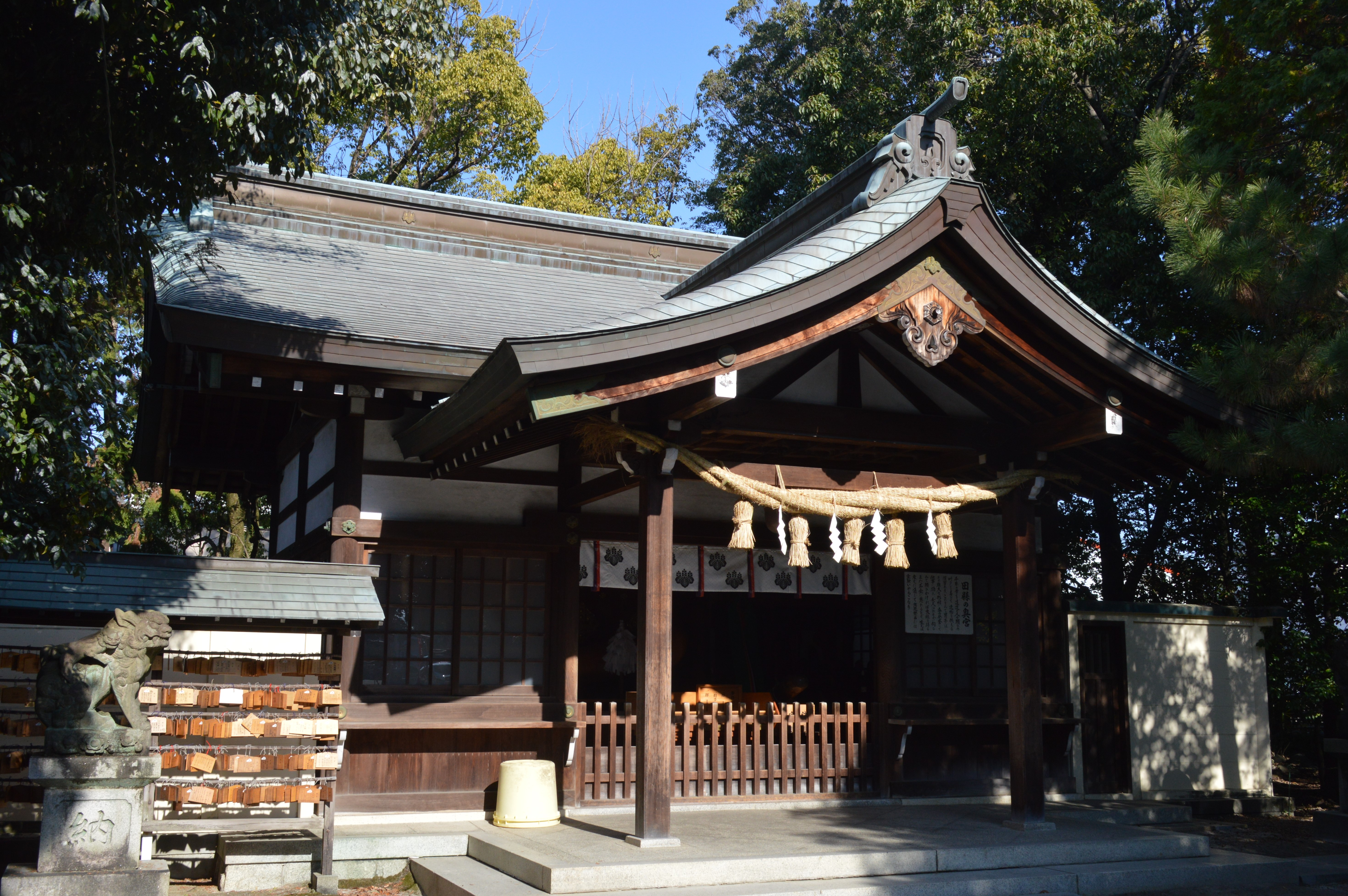
Okumiya

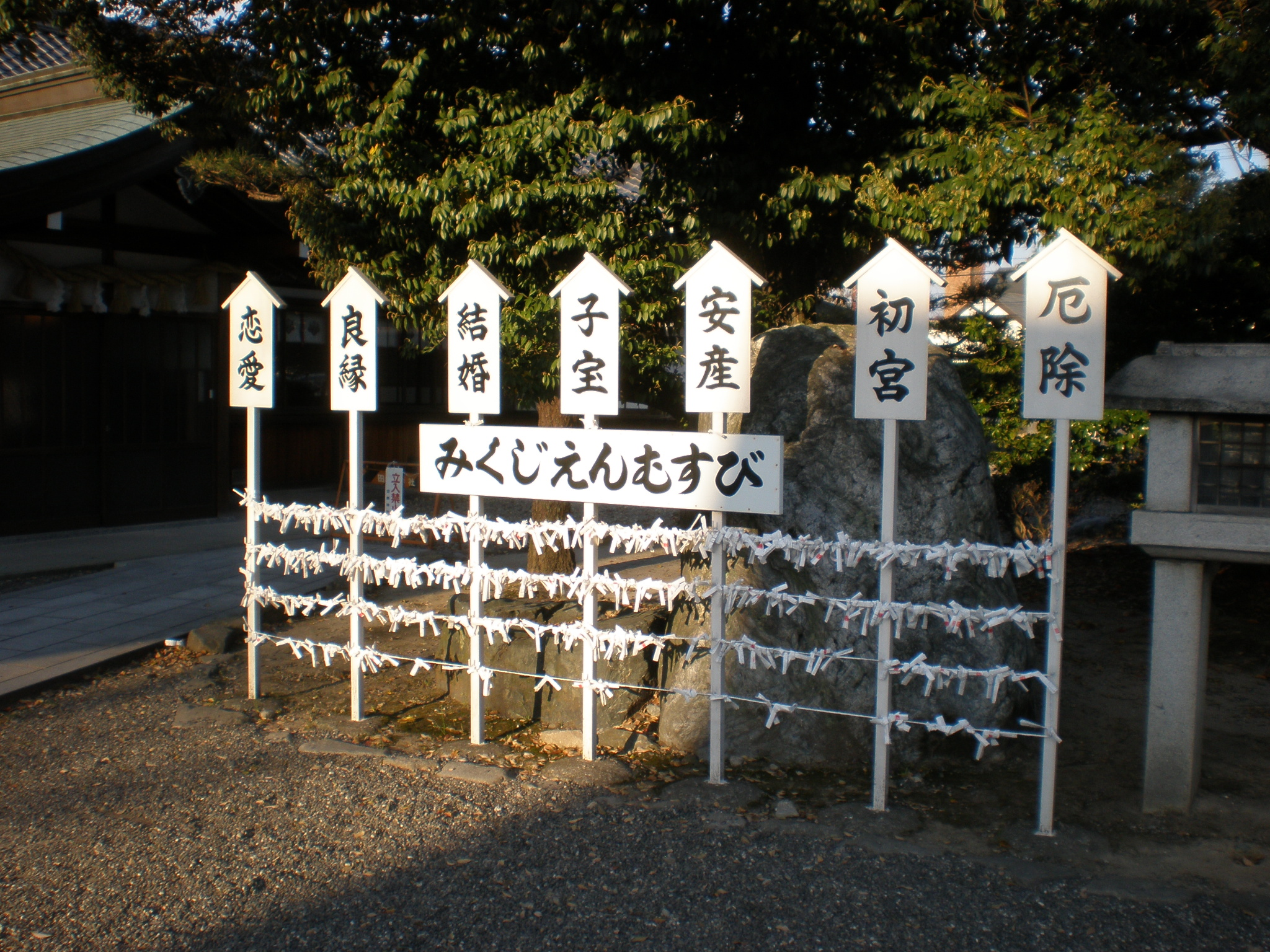
wish

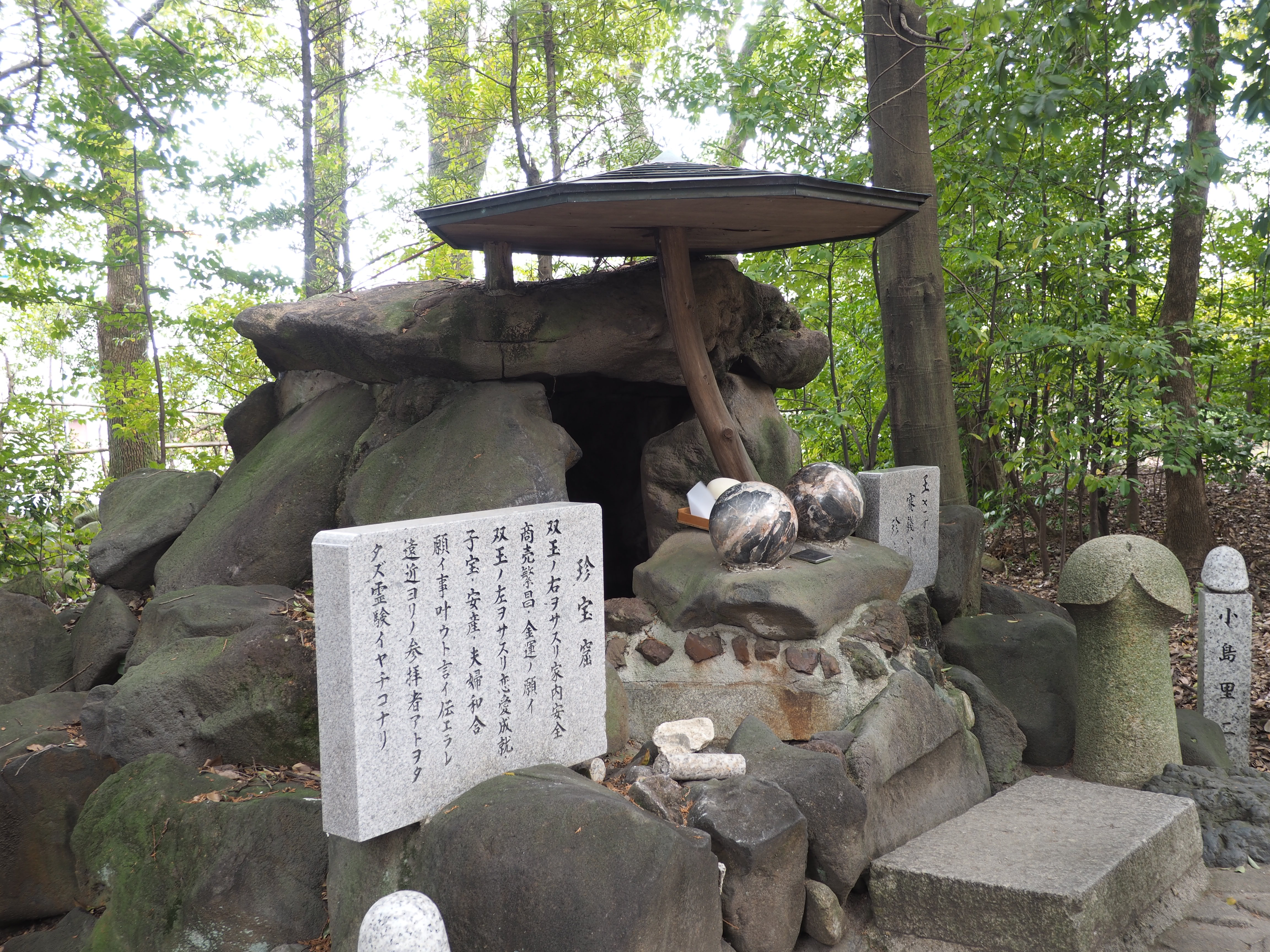
treasure cave

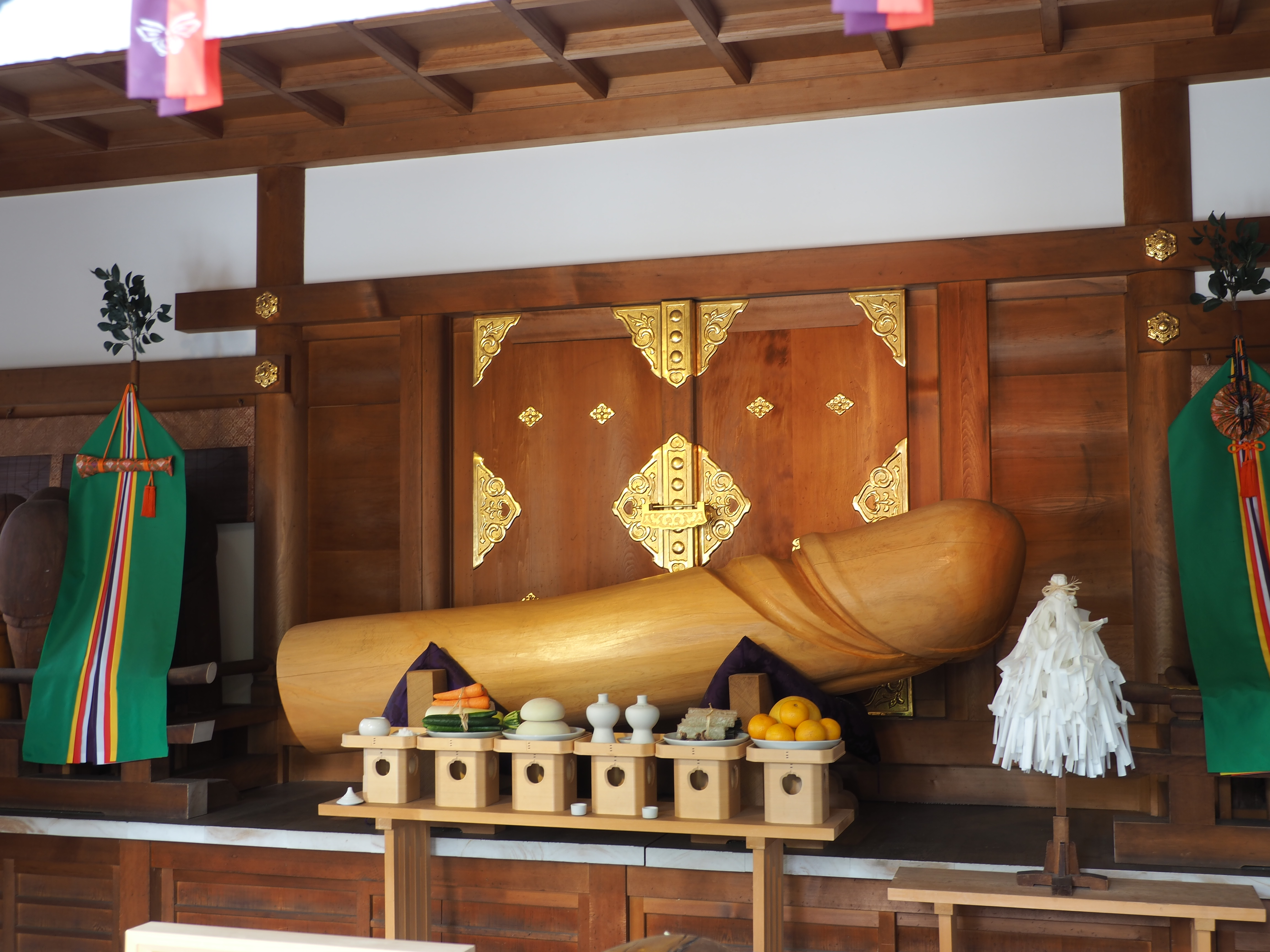
object of worship

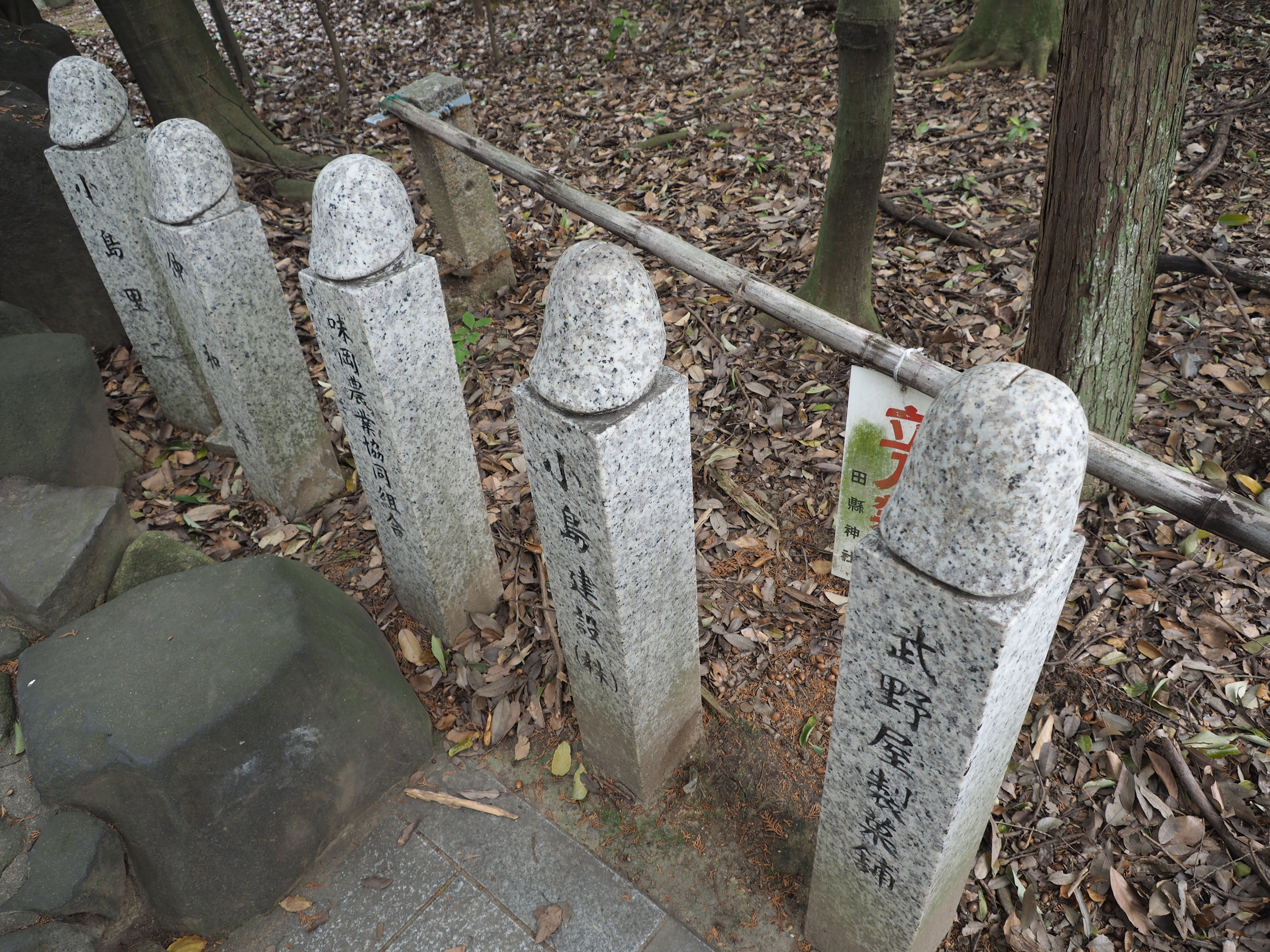
stone pillar

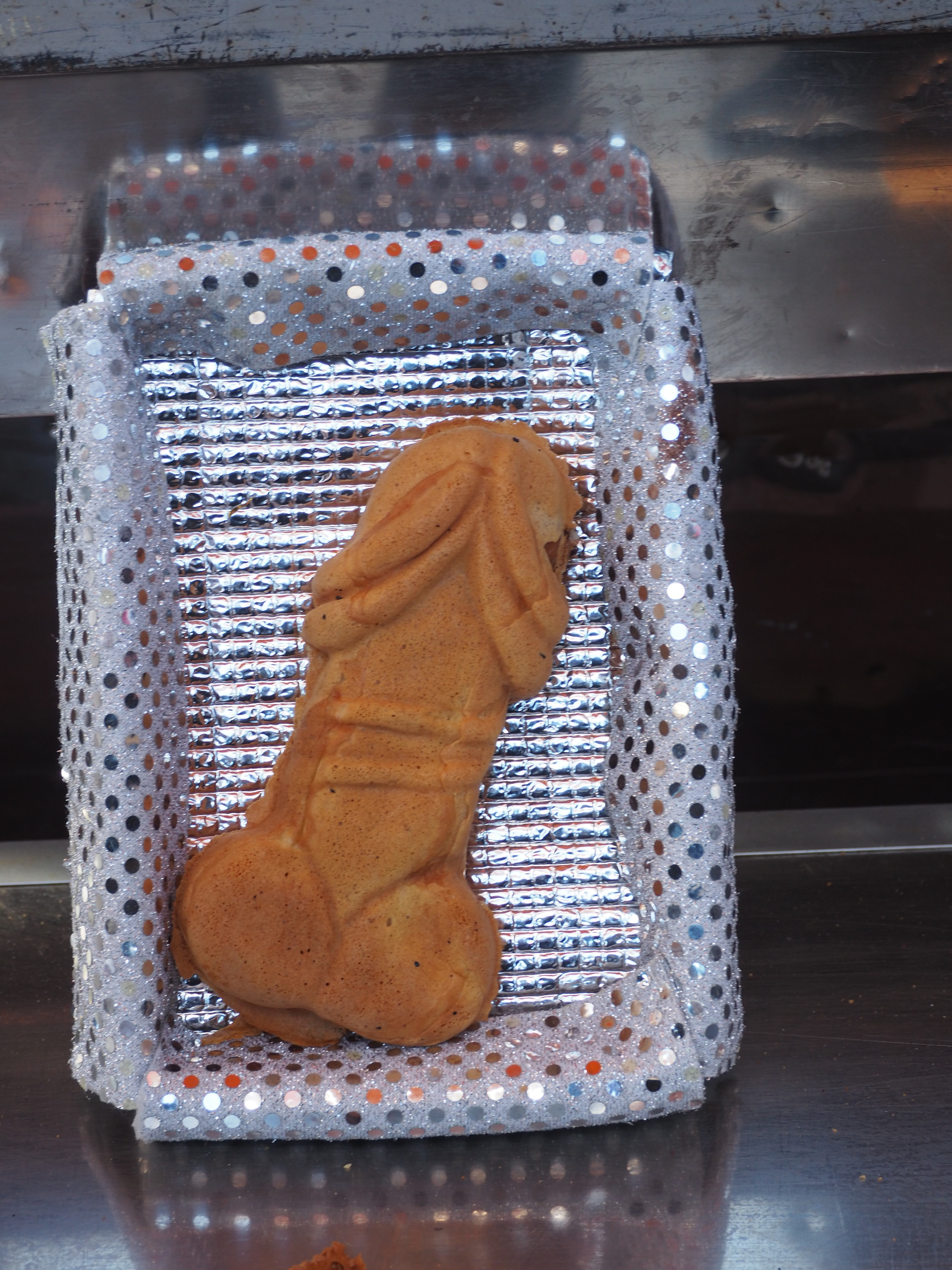
pastry

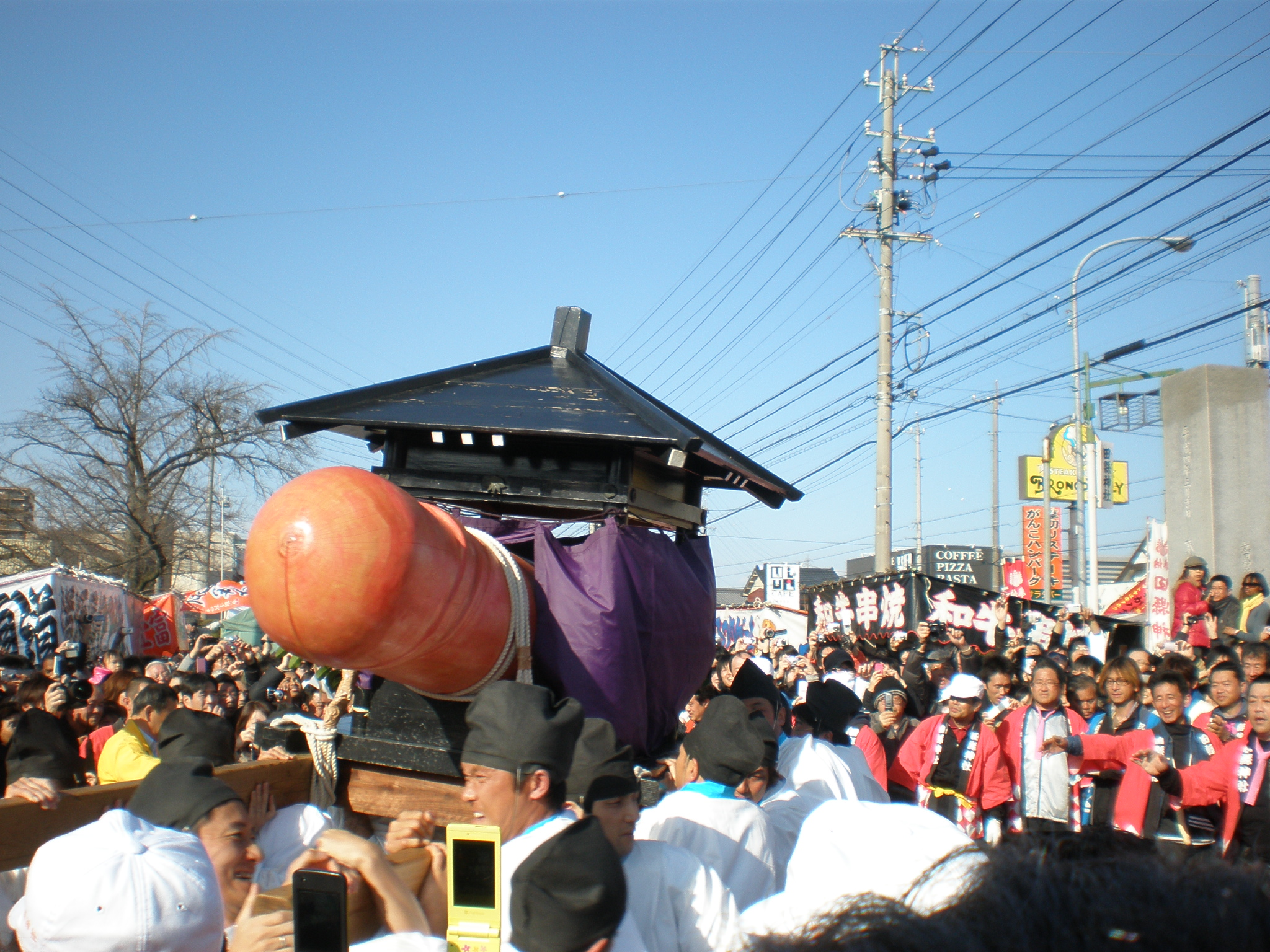
harvest festival

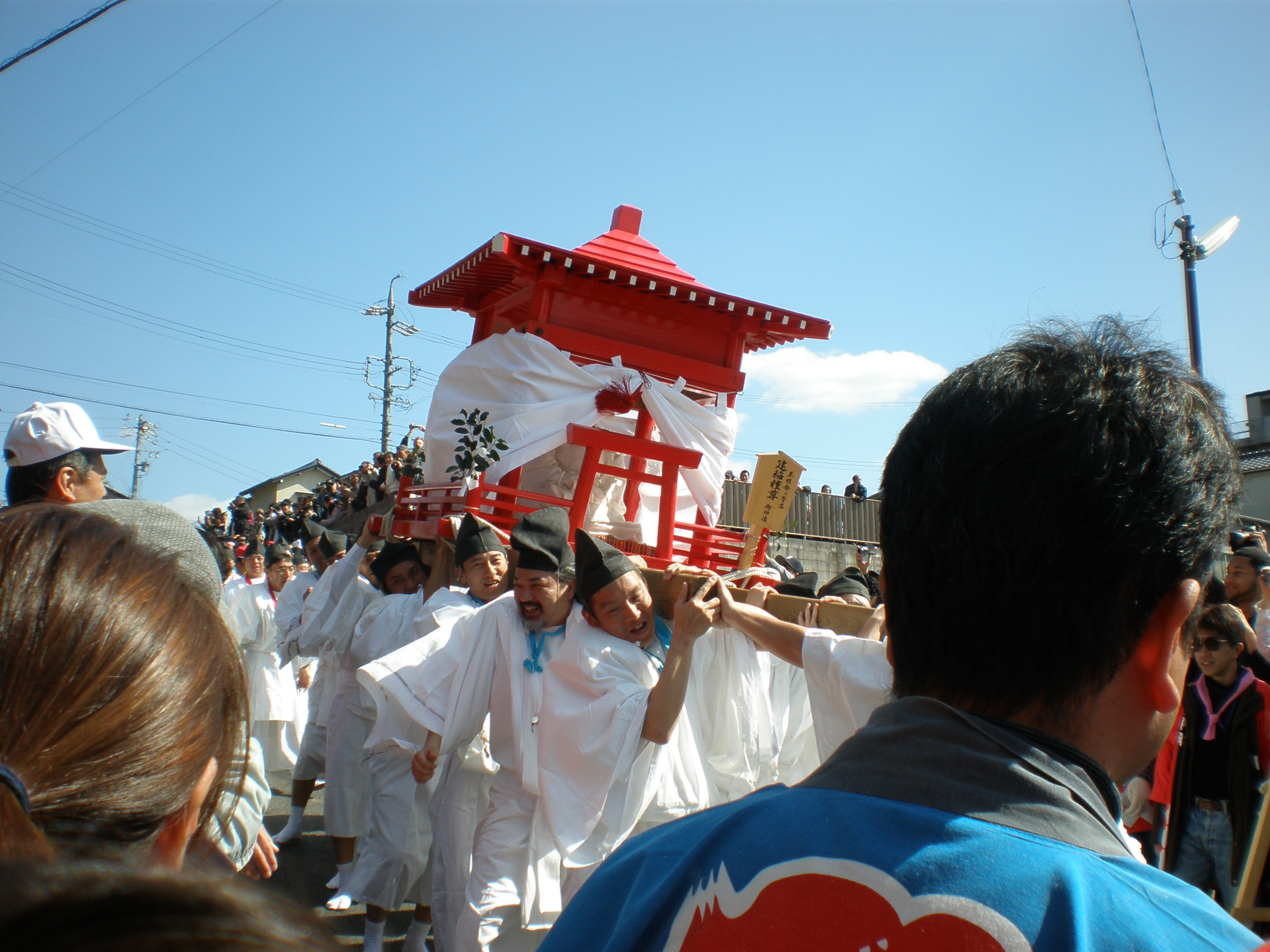
harvest festival

== Related pages ==
- Ōagata Shrine
- Kanamara Matsuri
- Phallic processions
