= Phallus =

Penis-like object

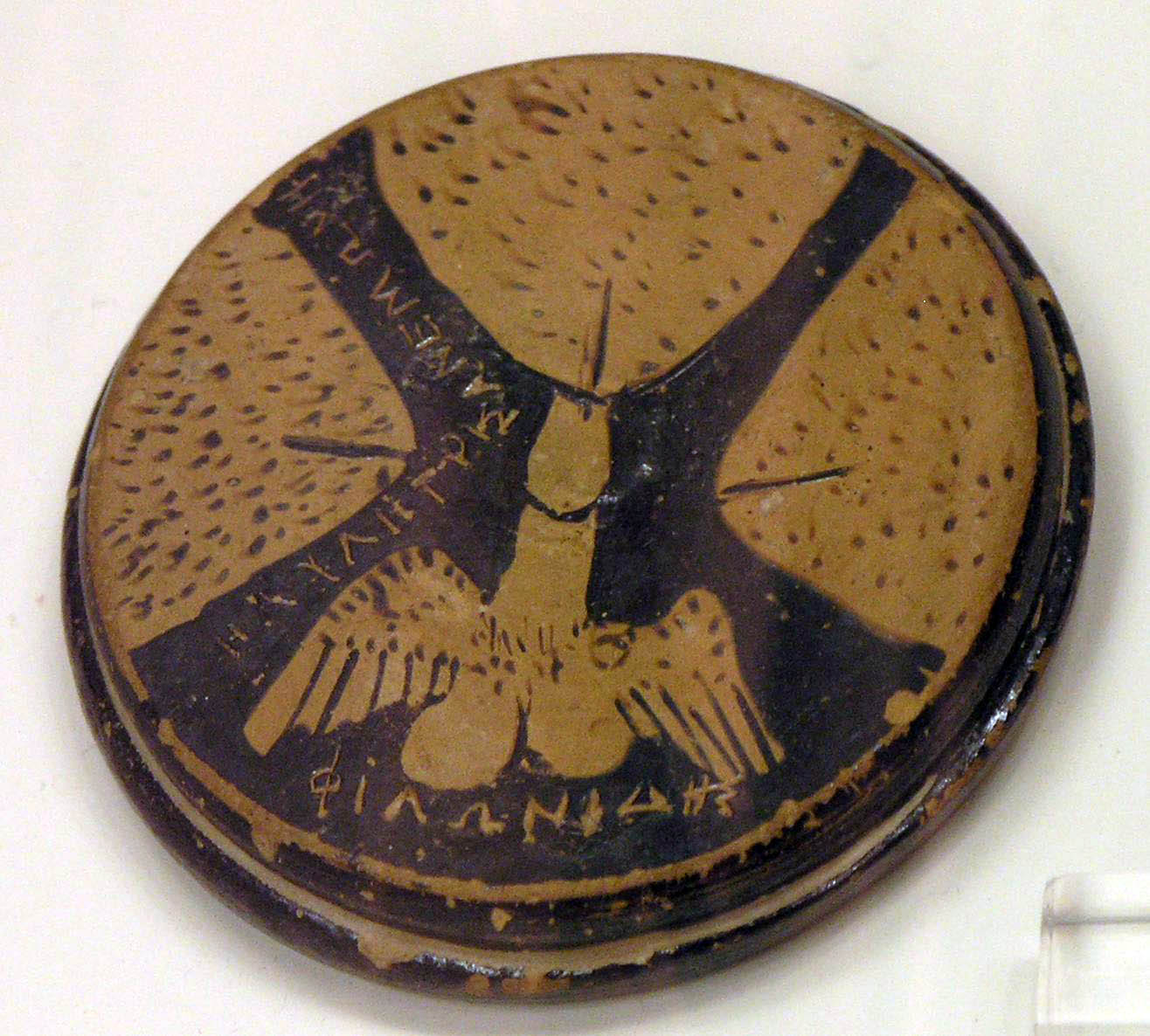
Attic red-figure lid depicting three vulvae and a winged phallus. Origin unknown, c. 460–425 BC. Housed in the National Archaeological Museum in Athens.

A phallus (pl.: phalli or phalluses) is a penis (especially when erect), an object that resembles a penis, or a mimetic image of an erect penis. In art history, a figure with an erect penis is described as ithyphallic.

Any object that symbolically—or, more precisely, iconically—resembles a penis may also be referred to as a phallus; however, such objects are more often referred to as being phallic (as in "phallic symbol"). Such symbols often represent fertility and cultural implications that are associated with the male sexual organ, as well as the male orgasm.

== Etymology ==
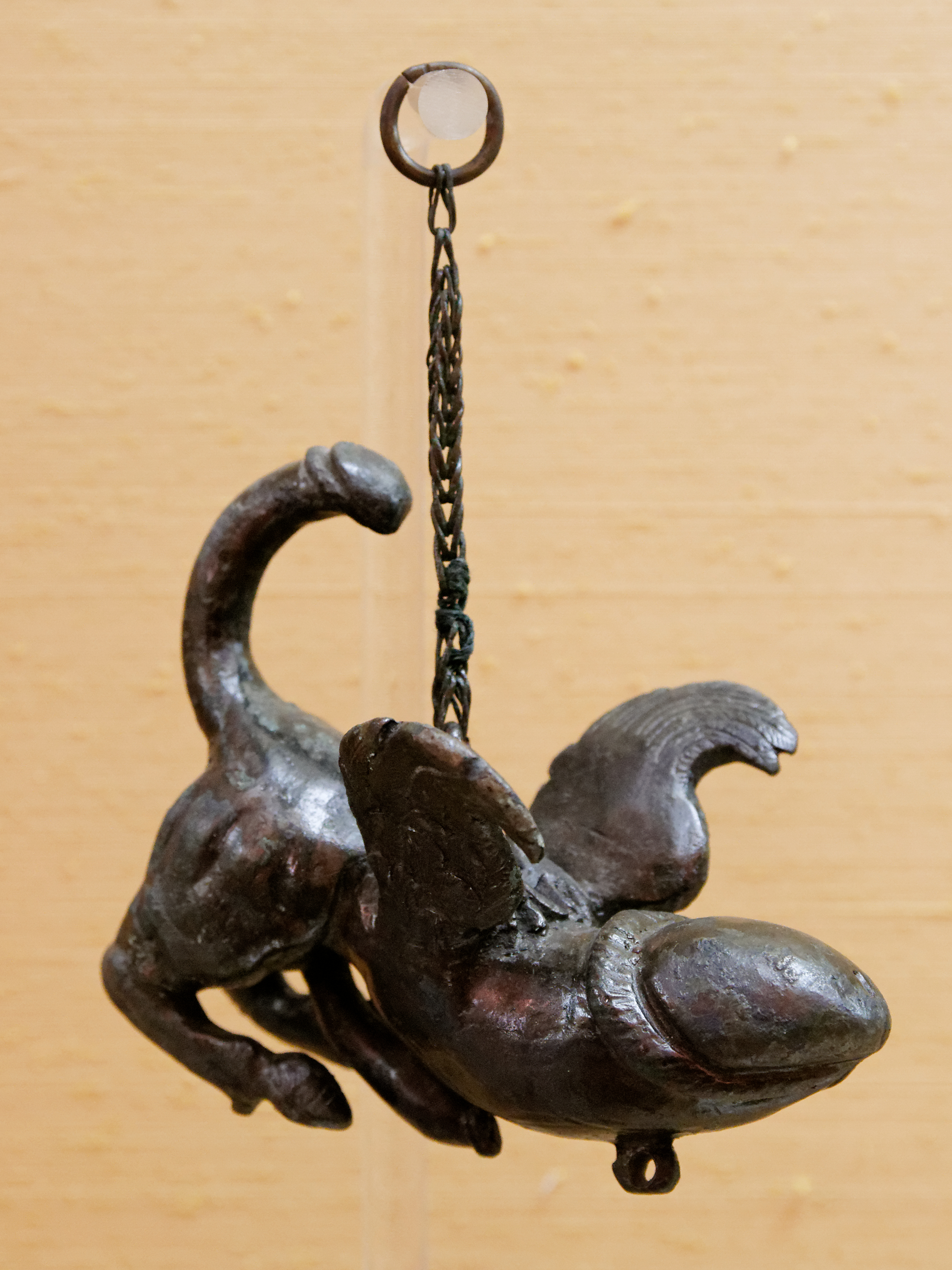
Tintinnabulum from Pompeii showing a phallus with wings, feet and a tail

The term is a loanword from Latin phallus, itself borrowed from Greek φαλλός (phallos), which is ultimately a derivation from the Proto-Indo-European root *bʰel- "to inflate, swell". Compare with Old Norse (and modern Icelandic) boli, "bull", Old English bulluc, "bullock", Greek φαλλή, "whale".

== Archaeology ==
The Hohle phallus, a 28,000-year-old siltstone phallus discovered in the Hohle Fels cave and reassembled in 2005, is among the oldest phallic representations known.

=== Circumcised phalli ===
Eighteen models of circumcised phalli, carved from local chalk, were discovered in subterranean complexes at Maresha, Israel, dating to before the conquest of Idumaea by the Jewish Hasmoneans in the late 2nd century BCE. Most are life-sized and apparently erect, and several retain traces of red or black pigment. Scholars have associated them with Dionysian or Hermetic cults, apotropaic functions, or healing rituals. Their circumcised form is notable, as depictions of exposed glans were regarded as indecent in Hellenistic art. The Maresha examples therefore indicate that circumcision was practiced among the Idumaeans before the reign of John Hyrcanus, the Hasmonean ruler who conquered Idumaea around 110 BCE and, according to the historian Josephus, compelled the Idumaeans to adopt Jewish law and circumcision. The Maresha finds are consistent with other evidence, such as the Zenon papyri (259 BCE) and biblical references to circumcised Edomites. This suggests that Idumaean circumcision predated the Hasmonean conquest, rather than being introduced forcibly under the Hasmoneans as described by Josephus.

== Religion ==
Various expressions of phallicism developed across cultures, ranging widely from adoration of representations of the male organ, to symbols of generative power across forms of nature worship, to promoting fertility through sexual rites. Phallic traditions may associate their symbols with the release of creative energy, or the return to a primeval state, or promoting the alchemical unification of opposites.

=== Ancient Egypt ===
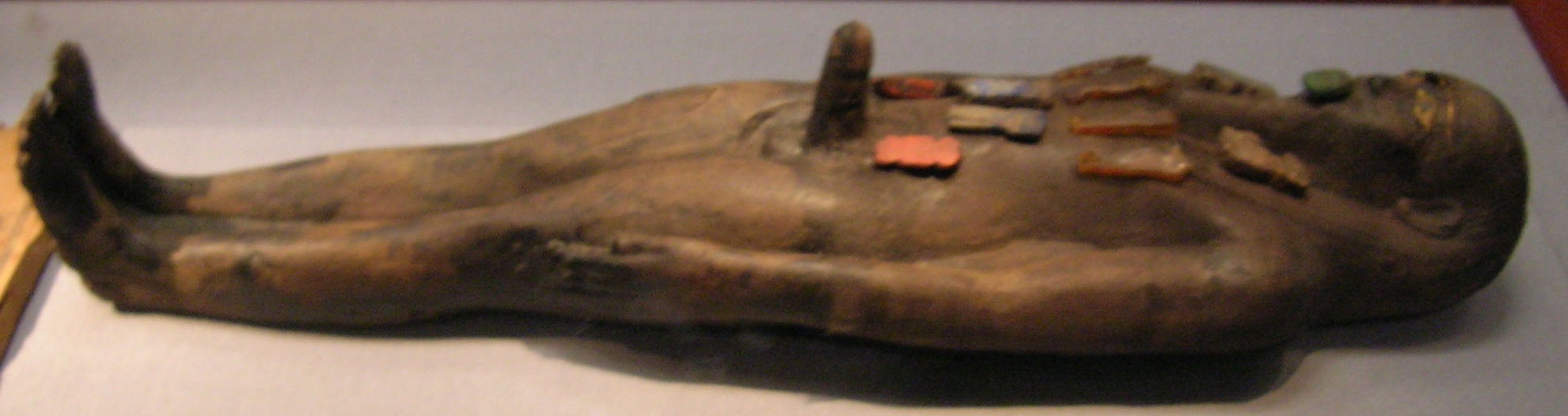
Egyptian statuette of Osiris with phallus and amulets

The phallus played a role in the cult of Osiris in ancient Egyptian religion. When Osiris' body was cut in 14 pieces, Set scattered them all over Egypt, and his wife Isis retrieved all of them except one, his penis, which a fish swallowed; Isis made him a wooden replacement.

The phallus was a symbol of fertility, and the god Min was often depicted as ithyphallic, that is, with an erect penis.

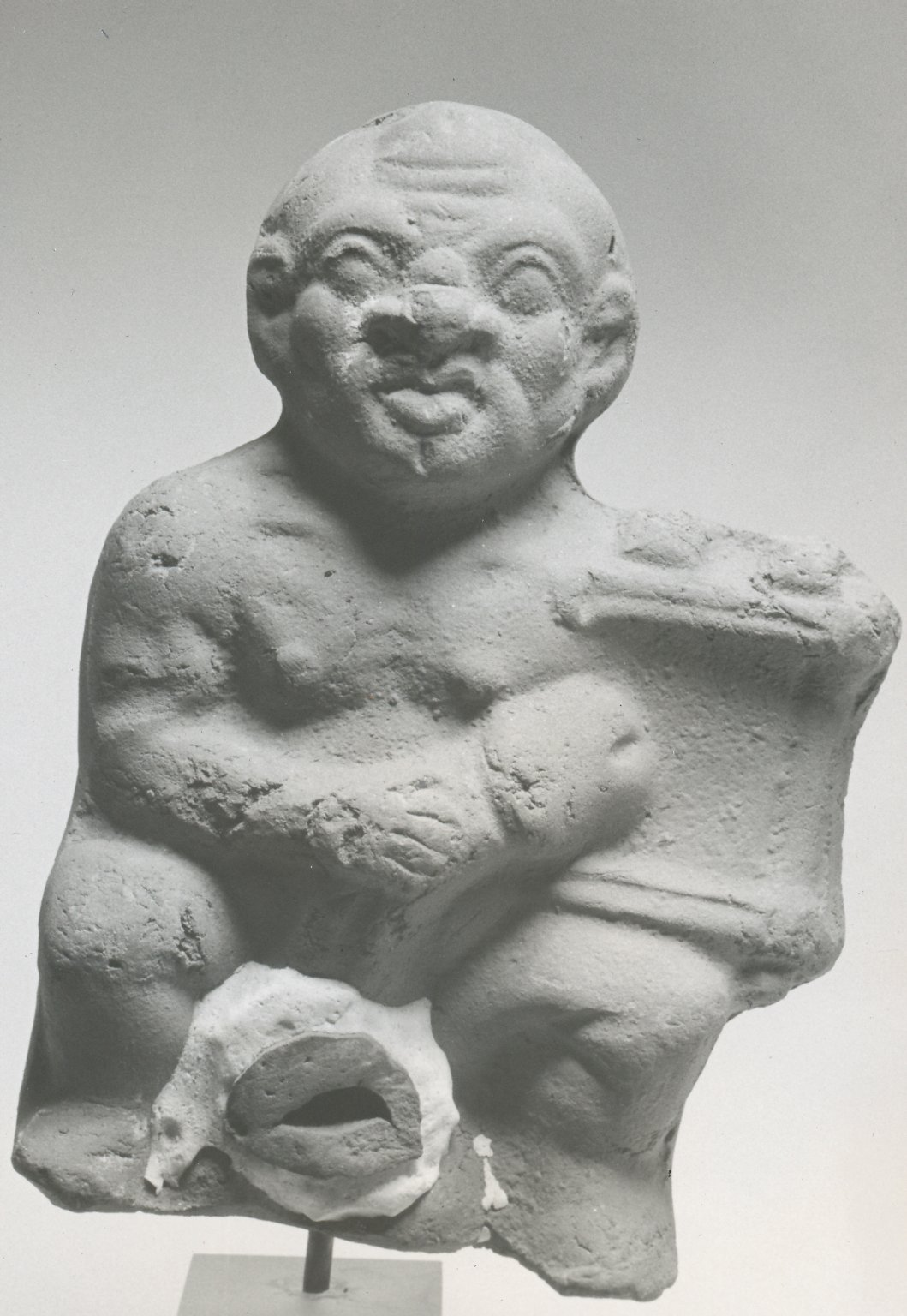
Ithyphallic man with a harp, Romano-Egyptian, 3rd–4th century, Brooklyn Museum

=== Ancient Greece and Rome ===
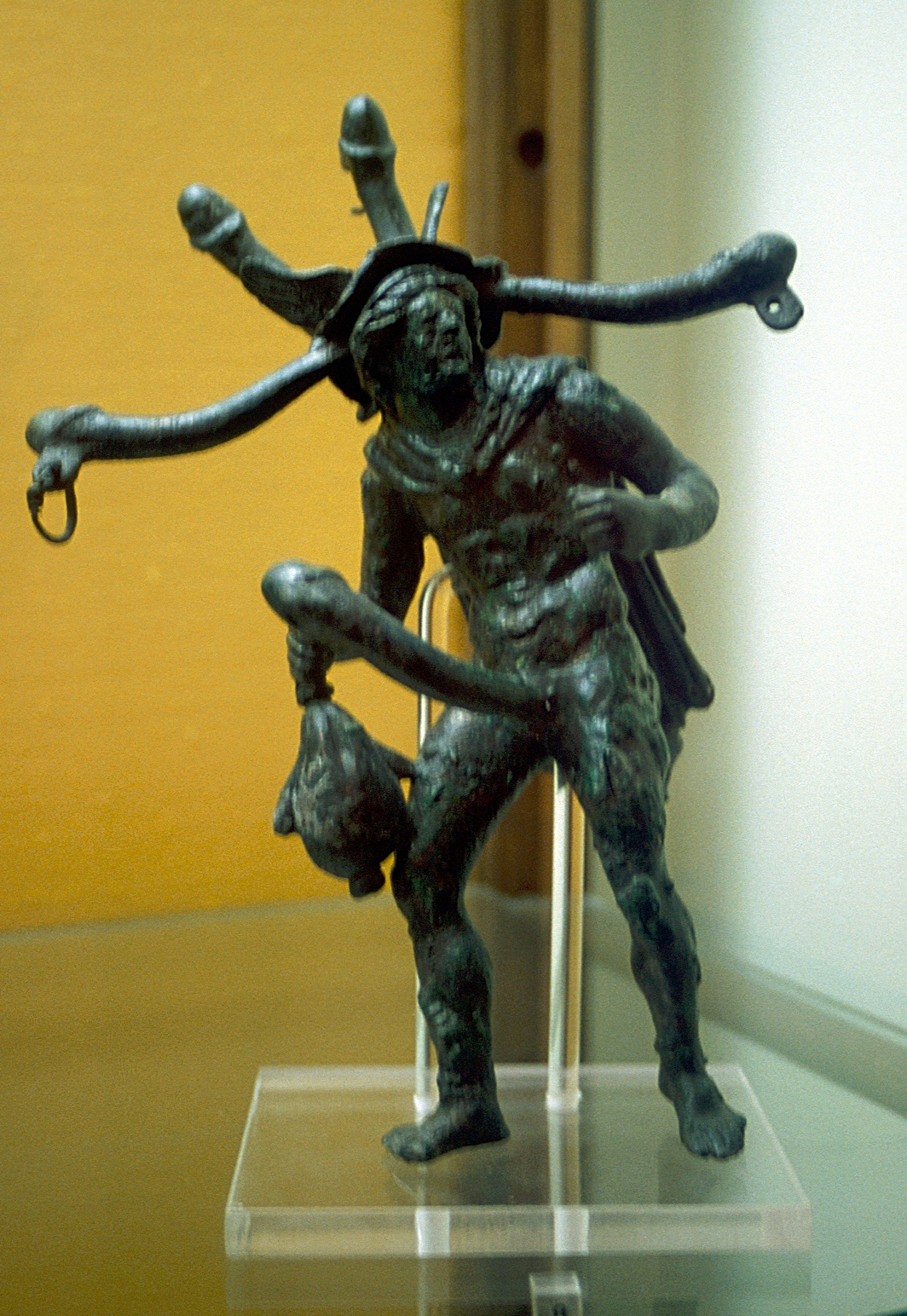
Polyphallic wind chime from Pompeii; a bell hung from each phallus

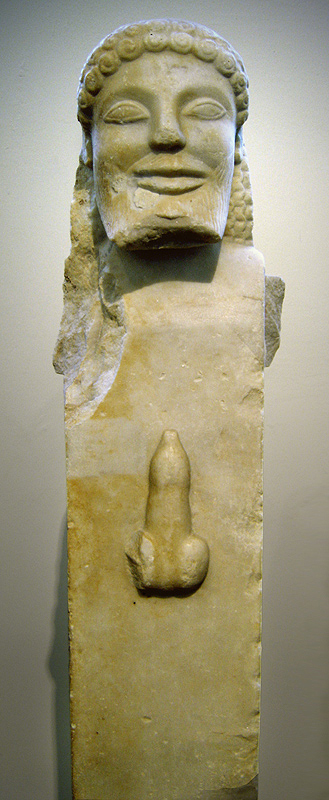
Herm

In traditional Greek mythology, Hermes, the god of boundaries and exchange (popularly the messenger god), is considered to be a phallic deity by association with representations of him on herms (pillars) featuring a phallus. There is no scholarly consensus on this depiction, and it would be speculation to consider Hermes a fertility god. Pan, son of Hermes, was often depicted as having an exaggerated erect phallus.

Priapus is a Greek god of fertility whose symbol was an exaggerated phallus. The son of Aphrodite and Dionysus, according to Homer and most accounts, he is the protector of livestock, fruit plants, gardens, and male genitalia. His name is the origin of the medical term priapism.

The city of Tyrnavos in Greece holds an annual Phallus festival, a traditional event celebrating the phallus on the first days of Lent.

The phallus was ubiquitous in ancient Roman culture, particularly in the form of the fascinum, a phallic charm. The ruins of Pompeii produced bronze wind chimes (tintinnabula) that featured the phallus, often in multiples, to ward off the evil eye and other malevolent influences. Statues of Priapus similarly guarded gardens. Roman boys wore the bulla, an amulet that contained a phallic charm until they formally came of age. According to Augustine of Hippo, the cult of Father Liber, who presided over the citizen's entry into political and sexual manhood, involved a phallus. The phallic deity Mutunus Tutunus promoted marital sex. A sacred phallus was among the objects considered vital to the security of the Roman state, which was in the keeping of the Vestal Virgins. Sexuality in ancient Rome has sometimes been characterized as "phallocentric".

=== Ancient India ===
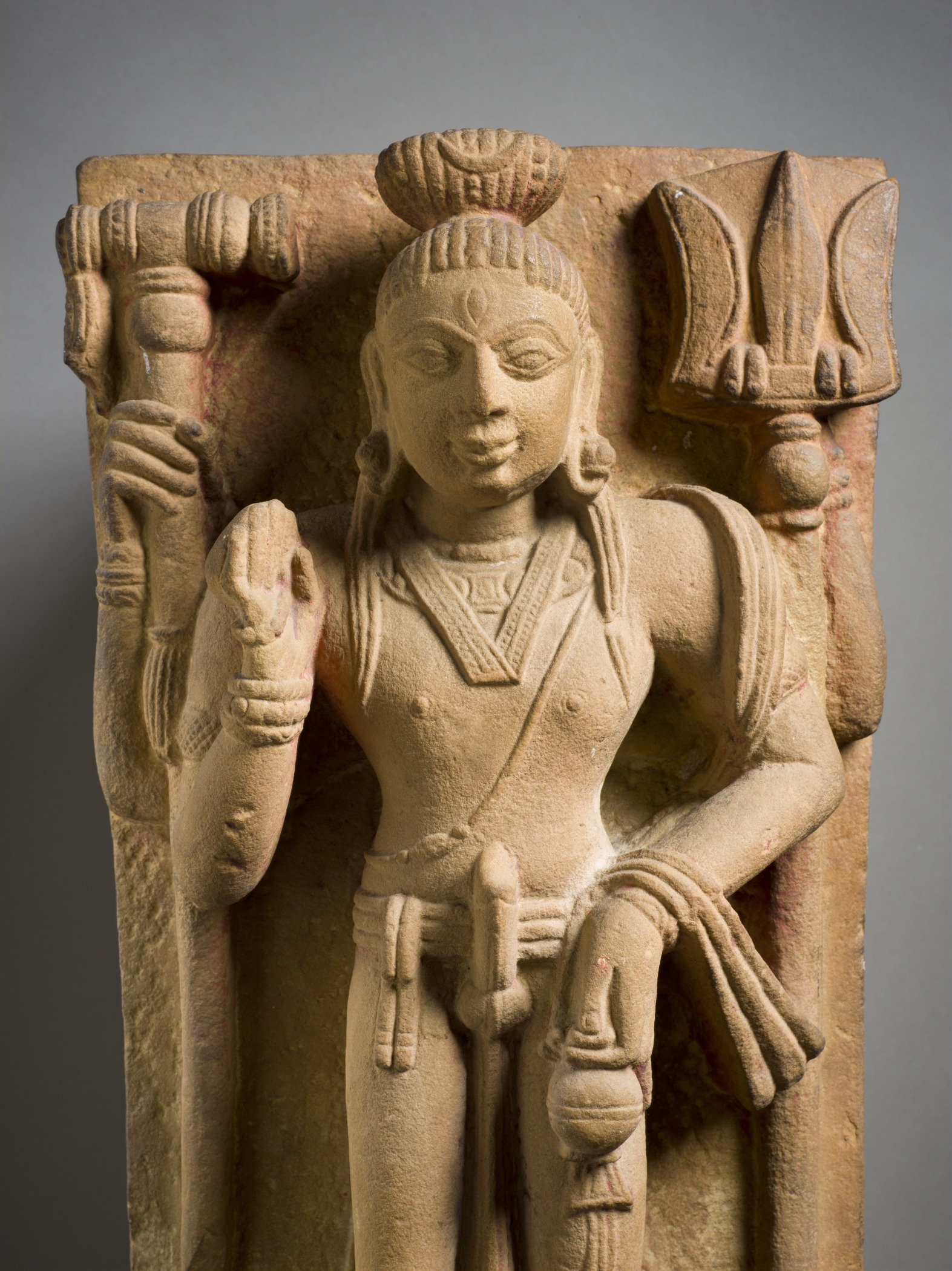
Ithyphallic Shiva, 3rd century AD

Shiva, one of the most widely worshiped male deities in Hinduism pantheon, is worshiped much more commonly in the form of the lingam. Evidence of the lingam in India dates back to prehistoric times. Although Lingam is not a mere phallic iconography, nor do the textual sources signify it as so, stone Lingams with several varieties are found to this date in many of the old temples and in museums in India and abroad, which are often more clearly phallic than later stylized lingams. The famous "man-size" Gudimallam Lingam in Andhra Pradesh is about 1.5 metres (5 ft) in height, carved in polished black granite, and clearly represents an erect phallus, with a figure of the deity in relief superimposed down the shaft.

Many of the earliest depictions of Shiva as a figure in human form are ithyphallic, for example, in coins of the Kushan Empire. Some figures up to about the 11th century AD have erect phalluses, although they have become increasingly rare.

=== Indonesia ===
According to the Indonesian chronicles of the Babad Tanah Jawi, Prince Puger gained the kingly power from God by ingesting semen from the phallus of the already-dead Sultan Amangkurat II of Mataram.

=== Bhutan ===
The phallus is commonly depicted in its paintings. Wooden phalluses, with white ribbons hanging from the tip, are often hung above the doorways of houses to deter evil spirits.

=== Ancient Scandinavia ===
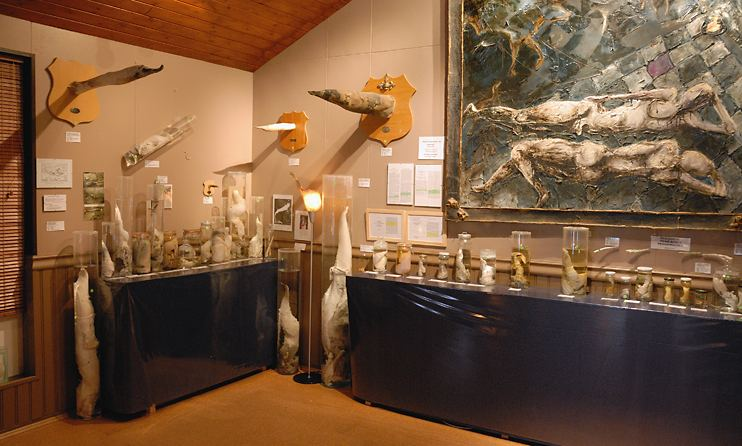
Husavik Phallusmuseum (Icelandic Phallological Museum), Húsavík

- The Norse god Freyr is a phallic deity, representing male fertility and love.
- The short story Völsa þáttr describes a family of Norwegians worshiping a horse penis that was preserved with linen and leeks.
- Some image stones, such as the Stora Hammers and Tängelgårda stones, are phallus shaped.

=== China ===
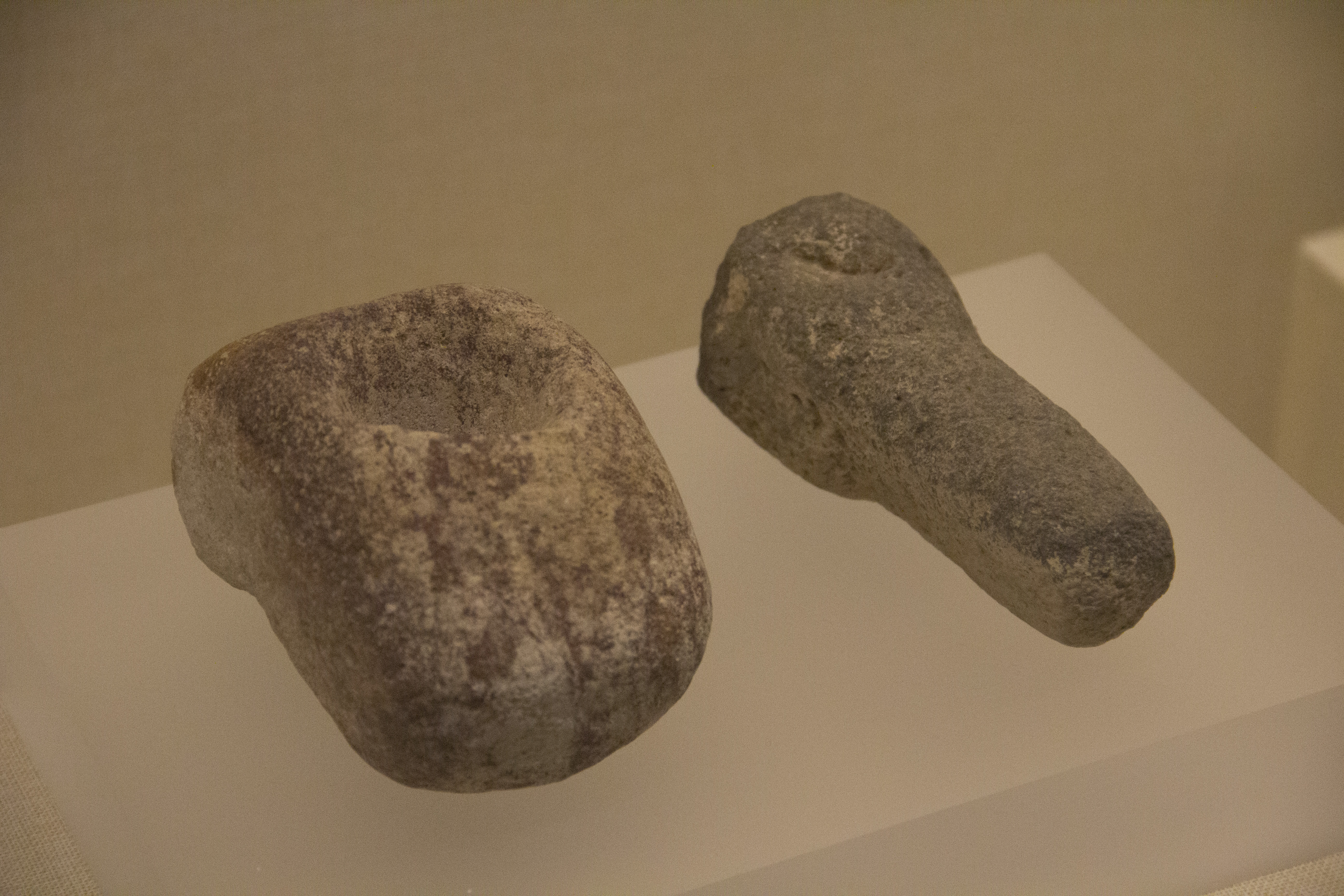
Neolithic stone phallus, c. 5000–3000 BCE. Xing'an County Museum, Guangxi, China.

Within the Daoist tradition of fangzhongshu (房中術, "arts of the bedchamber"), the male sexual organ was understood as the vehicle of yang essence, whose proper management, including the retention of semen, was considered essential to health, longevity, and spiritual cultivation. Every act of sexual union was regarded as cosmologically significant, each interaction between yin and yang carrying both physical and spiritual consequences. The earliest surviving texts on these practices were discovered among the silk and bamboo manuscripts unearthed at the Mawangdui tombs in Hunan Province in 1973, dating to the Western Han dynasty (before 168 BCE).

=== Japan ===
The Mara Kannon Shrine (麻羅観音) in Nagato, Yamaguchi Prefecture is one of many fertility shrines in Japan that still exist today. Also present in festivals such as the Danjiri Matsuri (だんじり祭) in Kishiwada, Osaka Prefecture, the Kanamara Matsuri in Kawasaki, and the Hōnen Matsuri (豊年祭, Harvest Festival) in Komaki, Aichi Prefecture, though historically phallus adoration was more widespread.

=== Balkans ===
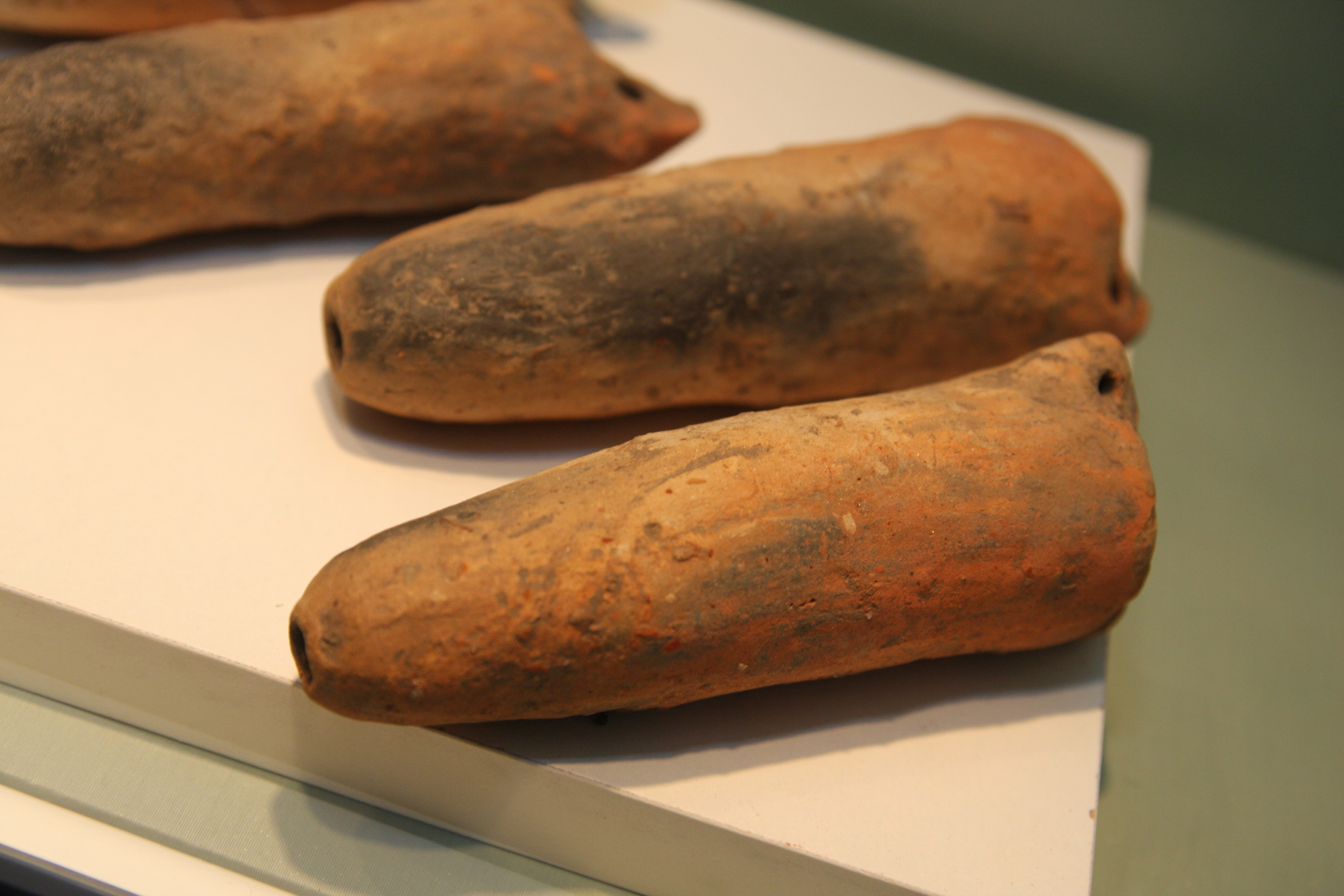
Phallus representation, Cucuteni Culture, 3000 BC

Kuker is a divinity personifying fecundity, sometimes in Bulgaria and Serbia it is a plural divinity. In Bulgaria, a ritual spectacle of spring (a sort of carnival performed by Kukeri) takes place after a scenario of folk theatre, in which Kuker's role is interpreted by a man attired in a sheep or goat-pelt, wearing a horned mask and girded with a large wooden phallus. During the ritual, various physiological acts are interpreted, including the sexual act, as a symbol of the god's sacred marriage, while the symbolical wife, appearing pregnant, mimes the pains of giving birth. This ritual inaugurates the labours of the fields (ploughing, sowing) and is carried out with the participation of numerous allegorical personages, among which are the Emperor and his entourage.

=== Switzerland ===
The bear on the arms of Portein, Switzerland, carrying a log, often interpreted as a phallus in accordance with the long-held tradition

In Switzerland, the heraldic bears in a coat of arms had to be painted with bright red penises, otherwise, they would have been mocked as being she-bears. In 1579, a calendar printed in St. Gallen omitted the genitals from the heraldic bear of Appenzell, nearly leading to war between the two cantons.

=== The Americas ===
Figures of Kokopelli and Itzamna (as the Mayan tonsured maize god) in Pre-Columbian America often include phallic content. Additionally, over forty large monolithic sculptures (Xkeptunich) have been documented from Terminal Classic Maya sites, with most examples occurring in the Puuc region of Yucatán (Amrhein 2001). Uxmal has the largest collection, with eleven sculptures now housed under a protective roof. The largest sculpture was recorded at Almuchil measuring more than 320 cm high with a diameter at the base of the shaft measuring 44 cm.

=== Alternative sects ===
St. Priapus Church (French: Église S. Priape) is a North American new religion that centres on the worship of the phallus. Founded in the 1980s in Montreal, Quebec, by D. F. Cassidy, it has a following mainly among homosexual men in Canada and the United States. Semen is also treated with reverence, and its consumption is an act of worship. Semen is esteemed as sacred because of its divine life-giving power.

== Psychoanalysis ==
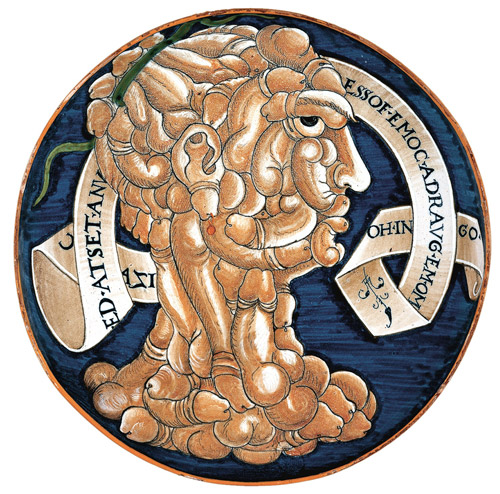
Phallic-Head Plate, Gubbio, Italy, 1536

The symbolic version of the phallus, a phallic symbol, is meant to represent male generative powers. According to Sigmund Freud's theory of psychoanalysis, while males possess a penis, no one can possess the symbolic phallus.

Jacques Lacan's Ecrits: A Selection includes an essay titled The Signification of the Phallus in which sexual differentiation is represented in terms of the difference between "being" and "having" the phallus, which for Lacan is the transcendent signifier of desire. Men are positioned as men insofar as they wish to have the phallus. Women, in contrast, wish to be the phallus. This difference between having and being explains some tragicomic aspects of sexual life. Once a woman becomes, in the realm of the signifier, the phallus the man wants, he ceases to want it because one cannot desire what one has, and the man may be drawn to other women. Similarly, though, for the woman, the gift of the phallus deprives the man of what he has and thereby diminishes her desire.

It should be remembered that the phallōs was a symbol of the real penis in its erect imaginary form.

— Michael Lewis

Norbert Wiley states that Lacan's phallus is akin to Durkheim's mana.

In Gender Trouble, Judith Butler explores Freud's and Lacan's discussions of the symbolic phallus by pointing out the connection between the phallus and the penis. They write, "The law requires conformity to its own notion of 'nature'. It gains its legitimacy through the binary and asymmetrical naturalization of bodies in which the phallus, though clearly not identical to the penis, deploys the penis as its naturalized instrument and sign". In Bodies that Matter, they further explore the possibilities for the phallus in their discussion of The Lesbian Phallus. If, as they note, Freud enumerates a set of analogies and substitutions that rhetorically affirm the fundamental transferability of the phallus from the penis elsewhere, then any number of other things might come to stand in for the phallus. In further critiques of the phallus, Lili Hsieh reverted Judith Butler's metaphysics of the phallus in psychoanalytic feminism, proposing that "feminism will also inspire psychoanalysis to rework its metaphysical theory of femininity" by equating vagina to Freud's notion of "penis envy", with referral to Michel Foucault's criticism that psychoanalysis normalizes and objectifies modern sexuality.

== Modern use of the phallus ==
The phallus is often used for advertising pornography, as well as the sale of contraception. It has often been used in provocative practical jokes and has been the central focus of adult-audience performances.

The phallus had a new set of art interpretations in the 20th century with the rise of Sigmund Freud, the founder of modern psychoanalysis of psychology. One example is "Princess X" by the Romanian modernist sculptor Constantin Brâncuși. He created a scandal in the Salon in 1919 when he represented or caricatured Princess Marie Bonaparte as a large gleaming bronze phallus. This phallus likely symbolizes Bonaparte's obsession with the penis and her lifelong quest to achieve vaginal orgasm.

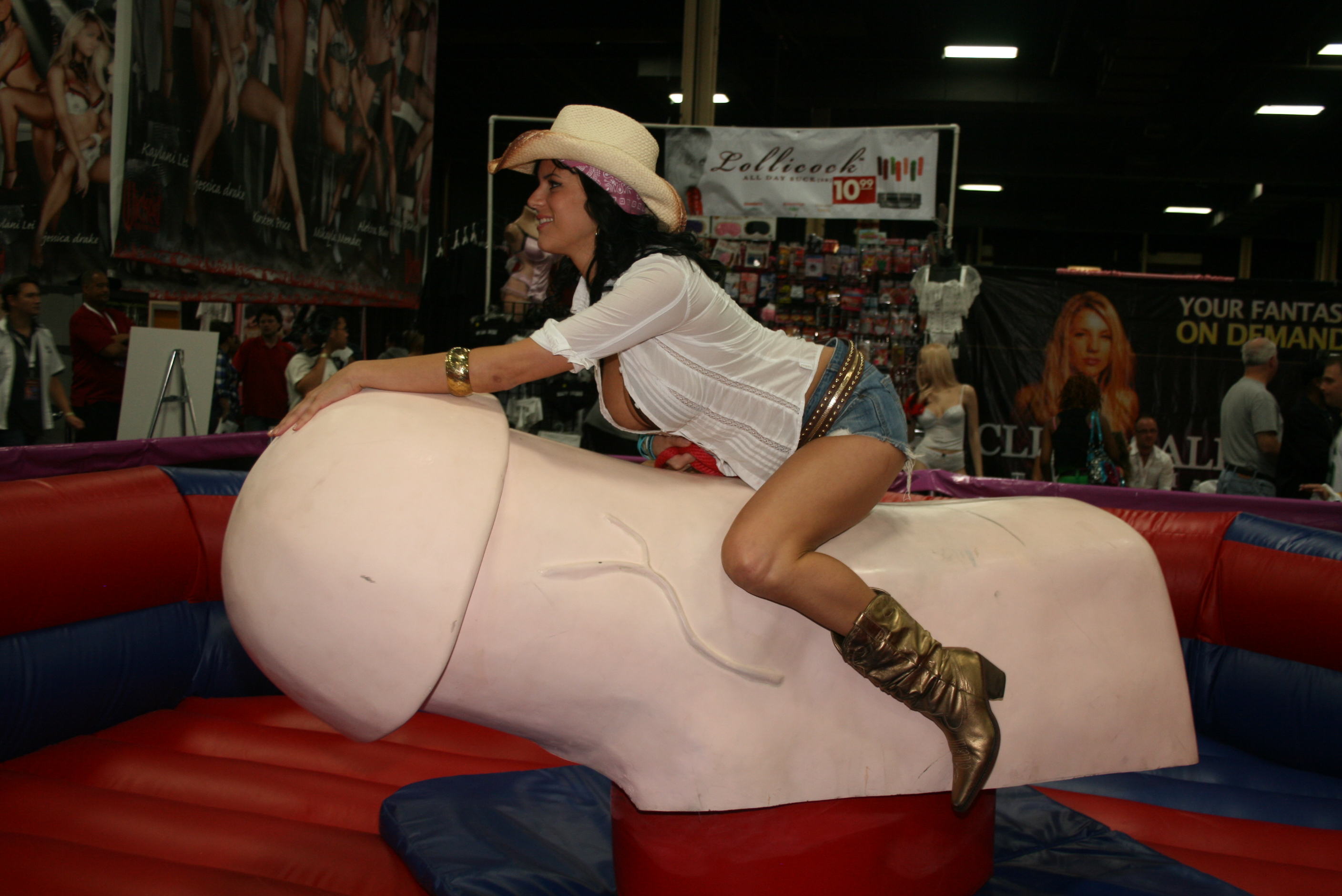
A woman riding a phallic mechanical bull at EXXXOTICA New York 2009

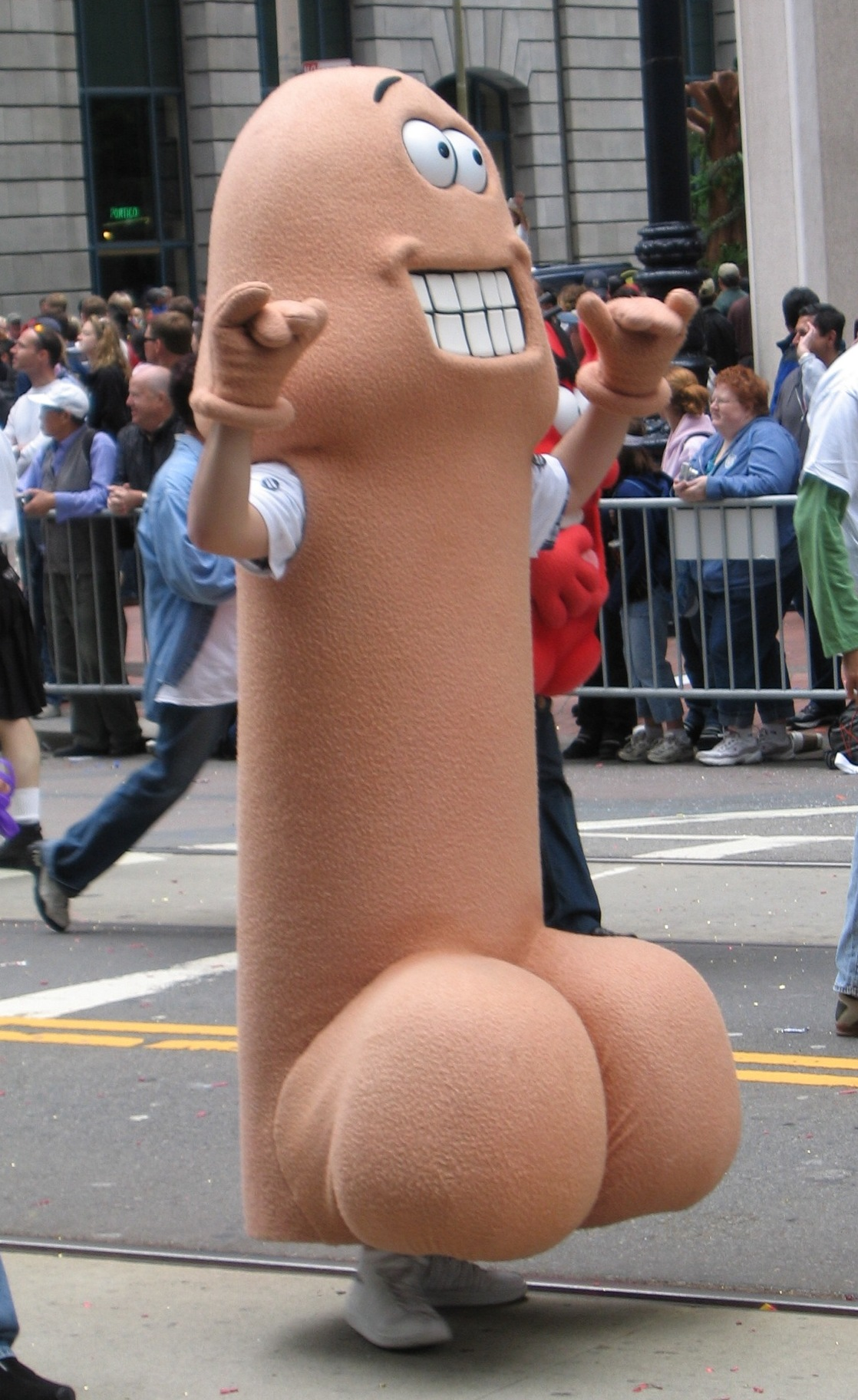
Penis costume at a 2005 parade in San Francisco

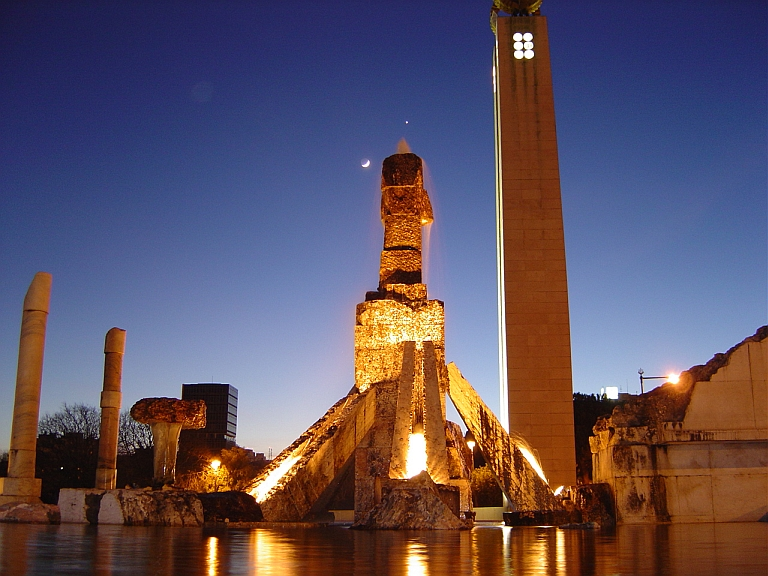
Monument to the Carnation Revolution, Lisbon, Portugal

== See also ==
- Dog's bollocks (typography)
- Hōnen Matsuri
- Kanamara Matsuri
- Mars symbol
- Maypole
- Phallic narcissism
- Phallus paintings in Bhutan
- Pizzle
- Theory of Phallicism (Black male studies)
