= Aotsuka Kofun =

Kofun period burial mound in Inuyama, Japan

- 青塚古墳 (Japanese)
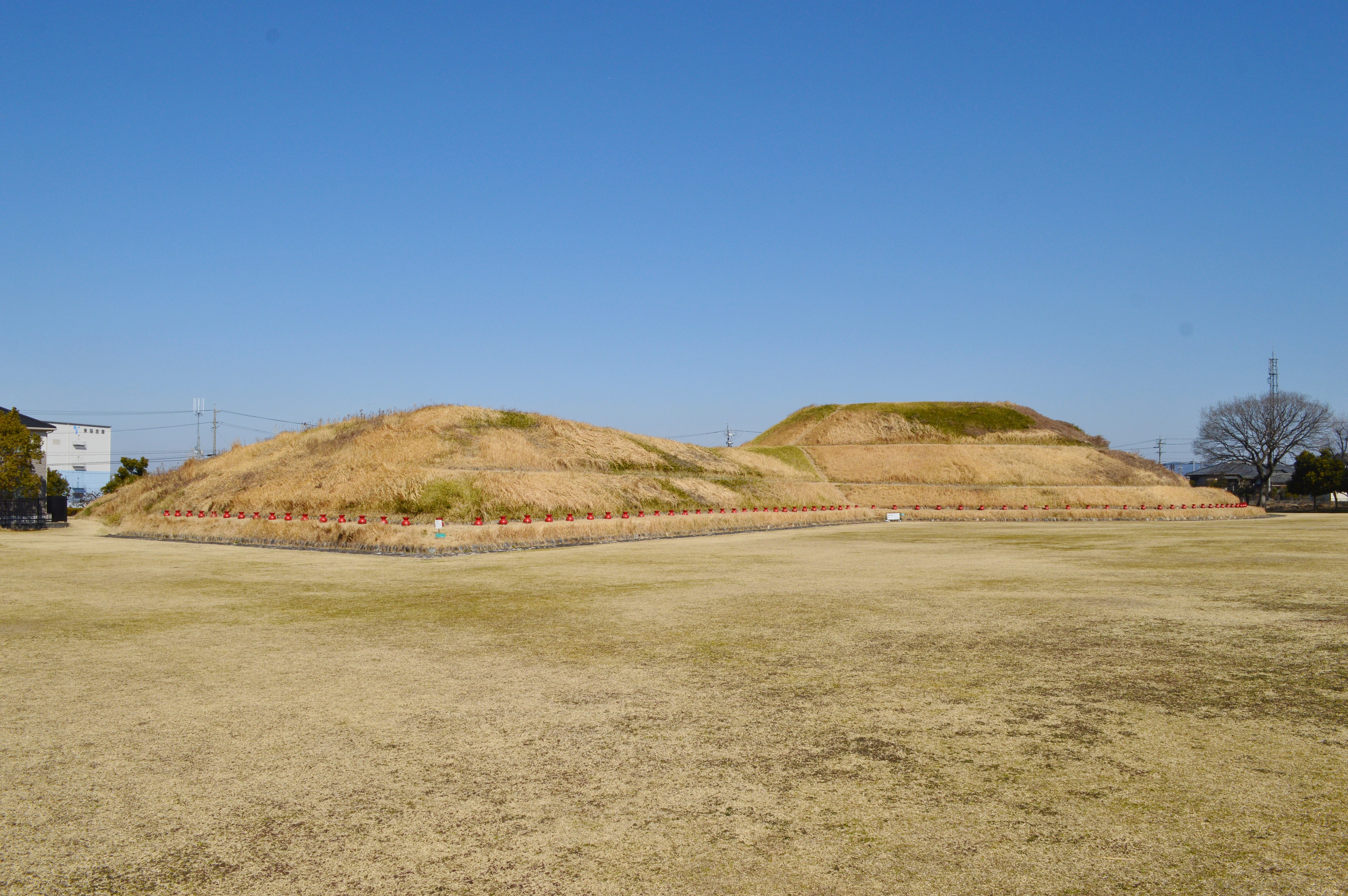
- Aotsuka Kofun

- Aotsuka Kofun Aotsuka Kofun (Japan)
- 35°19′34″N 136°55′45″E
- Type: Kofun
- Periods: Kofun period
- Location: Inuyama, Aichi, Japan
- Region: Tōkai region

History
- Built: mid 4th century

Site notes
- Public access: Yes, on site museum
- National Historic Site of Japan

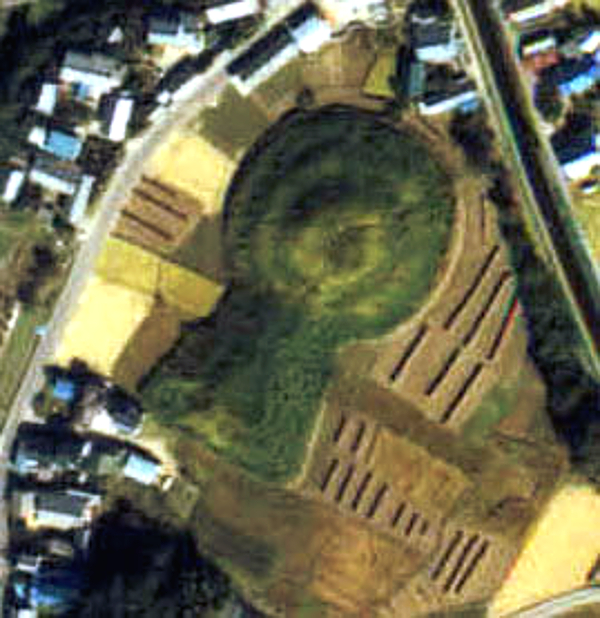
Aerial view of Aotsuka Kofun

The Aotsuka Kofun (青塚古墳) is a Kofun period burial mound, located in the Aotsuka neighborhood of the city of Inuyama, Aichi in the Tōkai region of Japan. It was designated a National Historic Site of Japan in 1983. It is the second largest kofun found in Aichi Prefecture after the Danpusan Kofun in Nagoya.

== Overview ==
The Aotsuka Kofun is located in the southern part of Inuyama, in western Aichi Prefecture. It is one of tumuli which once formed a kofun cluster in the surrounding area (most of which have now been destroyed). Archaeological excavations have been conducted in 1979 and from 1995 to 1998.

The tumulus is a zenpō-kōen-fun (前方後円墳), which is shaped like a keyhole, having one square end and one circular end, when viewed from above. It has a total length of 123 meters and is orientated to face southwest. It consists of a three-tiered posterior circular portion with a diameter of 78 meters and height of 12 meters, and a two-tier trapezoidal anterior portion, with a width of 62 meters, length of 45 meters and height of seven meters. A surviving portion of a moat is on the west side of the tumulus, and on the east side a raised embankment for crossing the now vanished portion of the eastern moat has also survived. An unusual feature of this kofun is the presence of a rectangular mound on the far end of its anterior portion, which may have been a ceremonial platform. The tumulus was formerly covered in fukiishi across its entire surface, and had rows of cylindrical and drum-shaped haniwa. It is believed to have been built in the middle of the 4th century in the early Kofun period.

The kofun is associated with the Ni-no-miya of Owari Province, Ōagata Shrine, which is located 3.5 kilometers to the east. The shrine claims that the kofun is the grave of its kami, Oarata-no-mikoto (大荒田命). During the Sengoku period, the tumulus was fortified as a castle by the forces of Toyotomi Hideyoshi during the 1584 Battle of Komaki and Nagakute.

The site is now open to the public with the exterior of the tumulus restored to its appearance at the time of construction, with a row of replica pot-shaped haniwa as part of the Aozuka Kofun Historical Park, which also has an on-site museum. It is located about a 30-minute walk from Gakuden Station on the Meitetsu Komaki Line.

== Ōagata Shrine ==
Ōagata Shrine
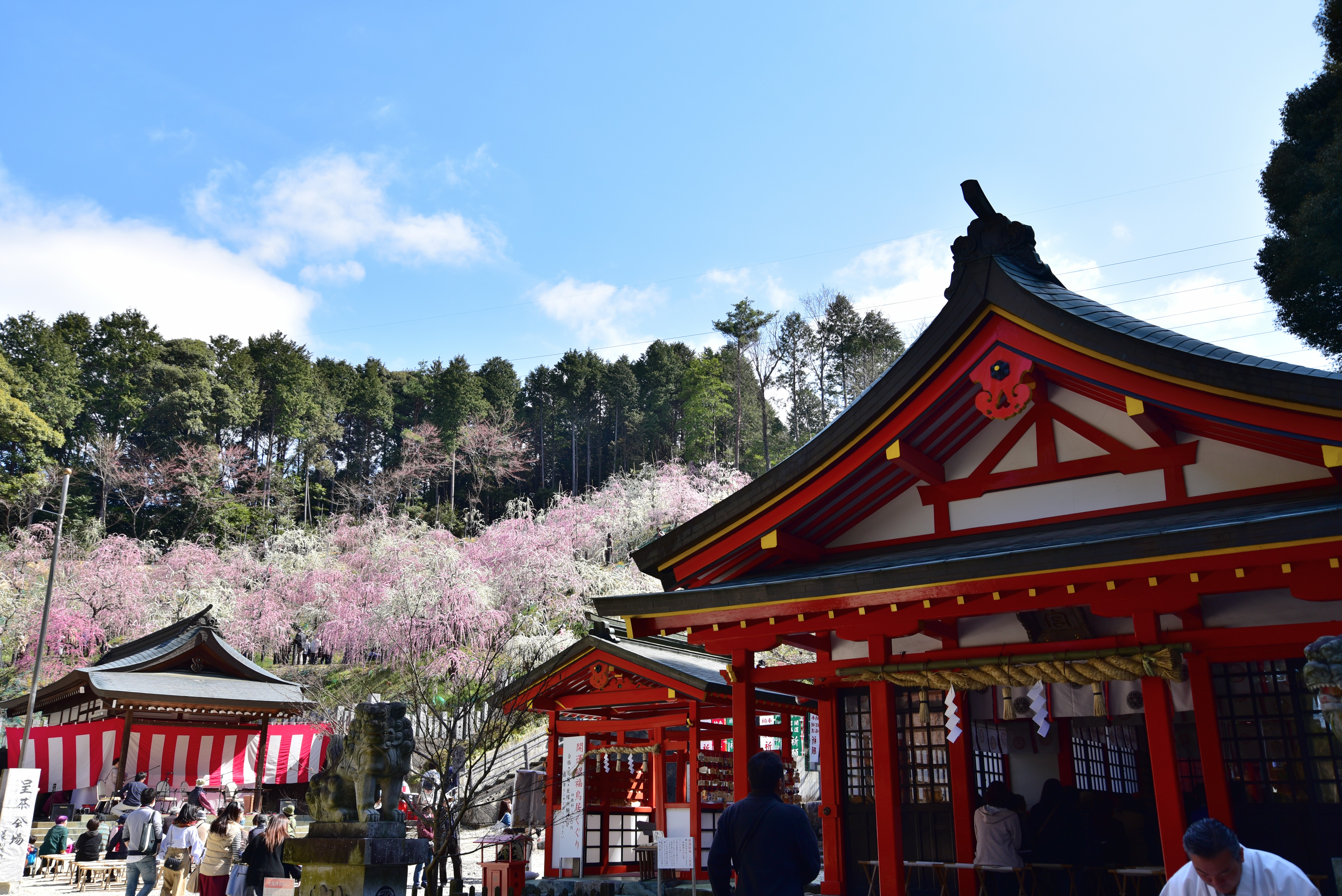
- Hime no Miya and Umezono

Religion
- Deity: Oarata-no-mikoto (大荒田命)
- Interactive map of Ōagata Shrine

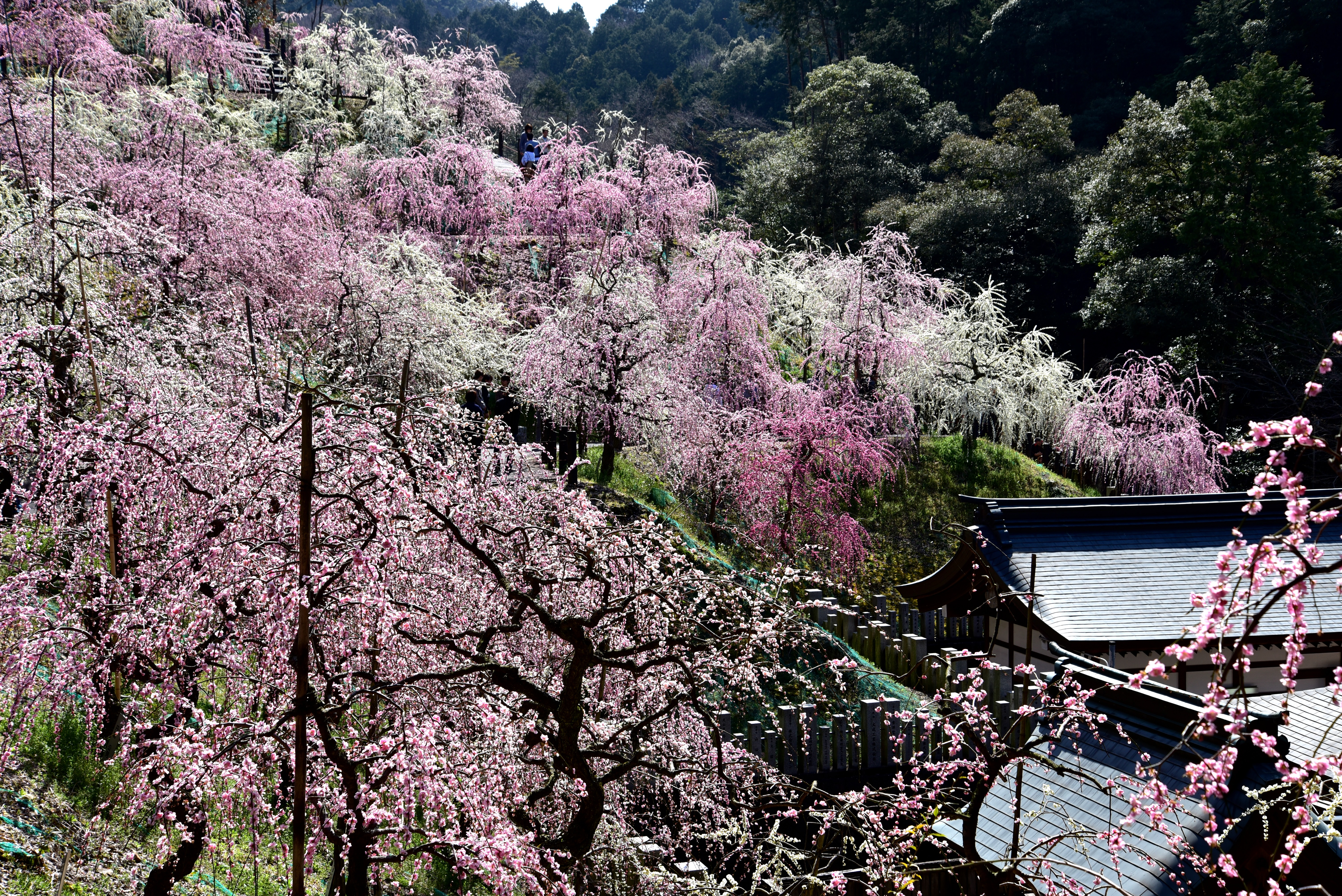
A plum orchard made on a slope.

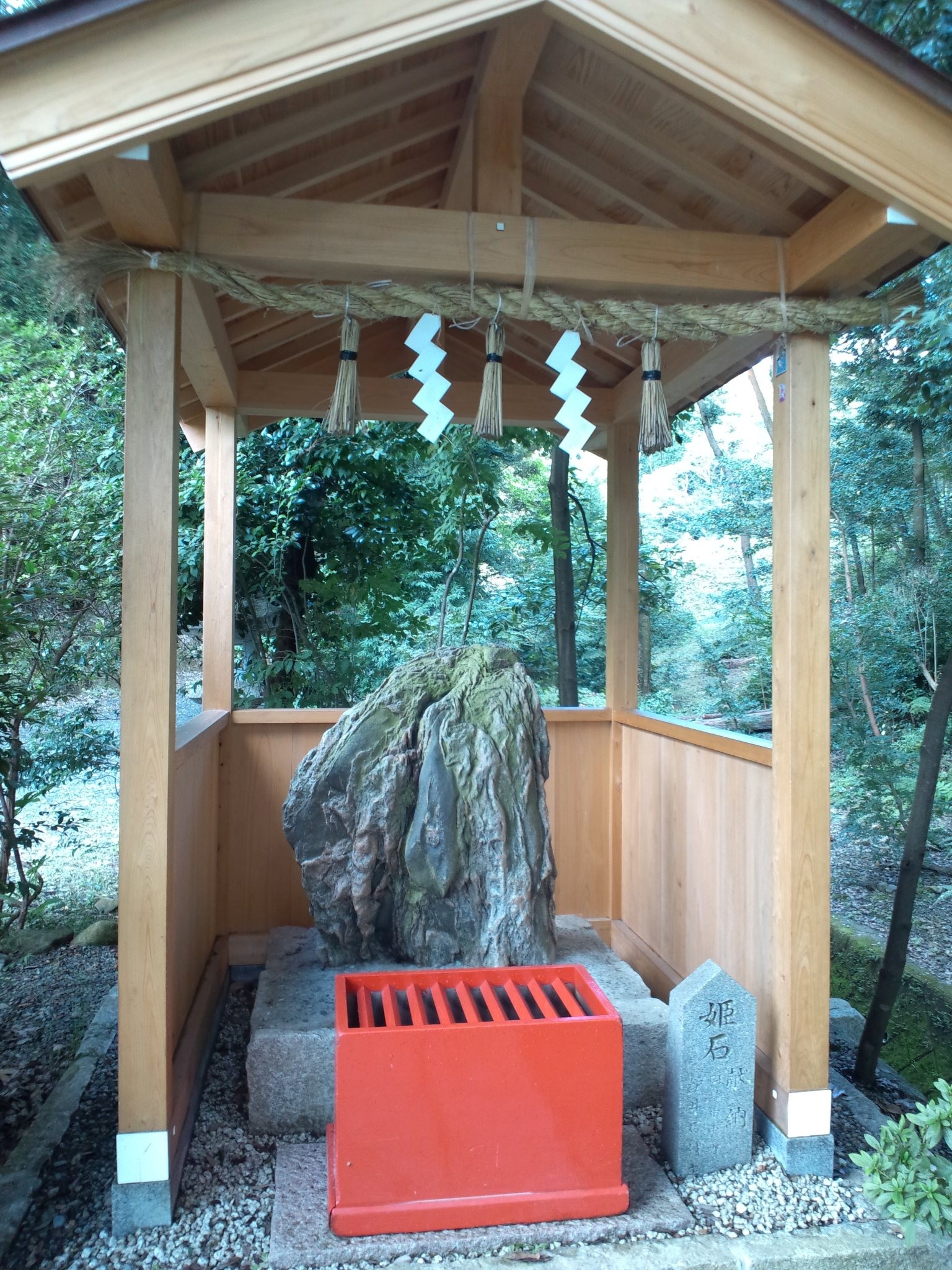
Himeishi

Ōagata Shrine (大縣神社) is a Shinto shrine located in Inuyama, Aichi.

It is the Ninomiya, or a second ranked shrine in Owari Province, ranked below Masumida Shrine.

It is located close to Tagata Shrine (田縣神社) the shrine famous for hosting the "penis festival" Hōnensai. Oagata shrine has a similar yonic festival the Sunday before this festival

Aotsuka Kofun is located on the grounds of the shrine, 3.5 kilometers to the west of the honden.

The shrine claims that the kofun is the grave of its kami, Oarata-no-mikoto (大荒田命). During the Sengoku period, the tumulus was fortified as a castle by the forces of Toyotomi Hideyoshi during the 1584 Battle of Komaki and Nagakute.

The deity is sometimes identified as Amatsuhikone or Kuni no Satsuchi no Mikoto

== See also ==
- List of Historic Sites of Japan (Aichi)
