= Hōnensai =

Annual Japanese festival

Coordinates: 35°18′57″N 136°56′28″E

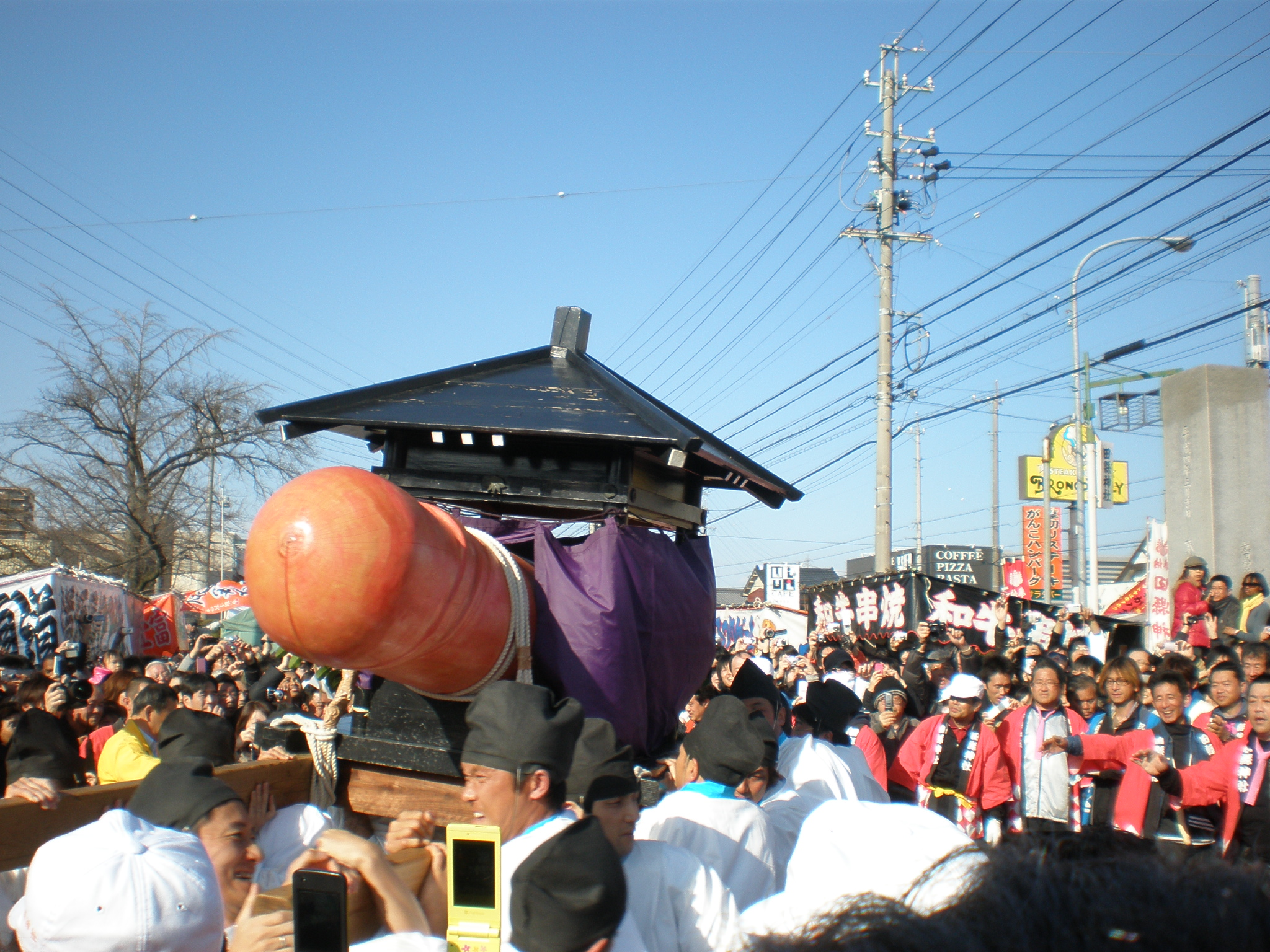
- Hōnensai at Tagata Shrine in Komaki
- Observed by: Japan (specific locations)
- Type: Religious
- Significance: Celebrates the blessings of a bountiful harvest and all manner of prosperity and fertility
- Date: 15 March
- Next time: 15 March 2027

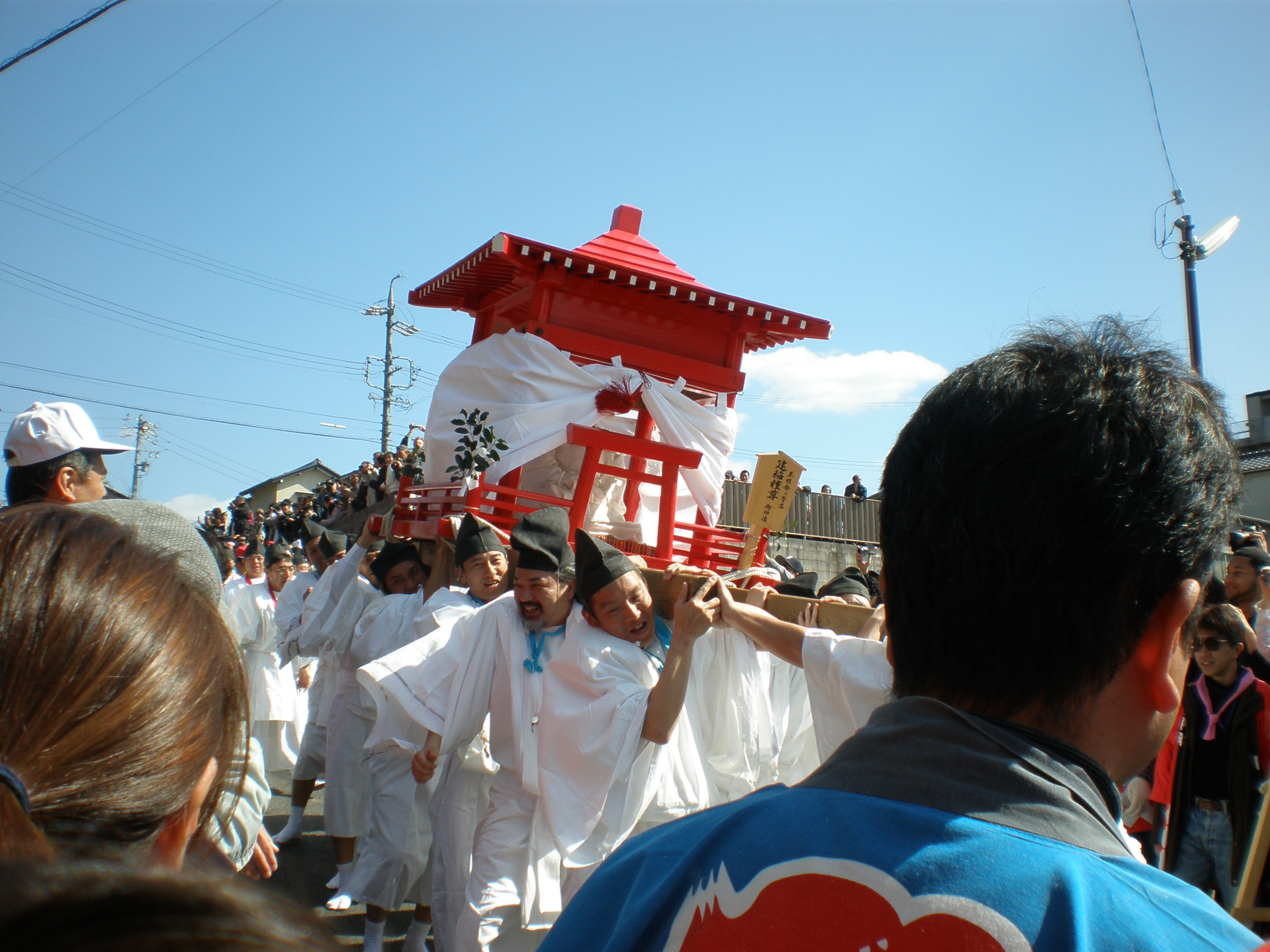
Hōnensai

Harvest Festival (豊年祭, Hōnensai) is a fertility festival celebrated every year on March 15 in some locations in Aichi Prefecture, Japan. Hōnen means prosperous year in Japanese, implying a rich harvest, while a matsuri is a festival. The Hōnen festival and ceremony celebrate the blessings of a bountiful harvest and all manner of prosperity and fertility.

The best known of these festivals takes place in the town of Komaki, just north of Nagoya City. The festival's main features are Shinto priests playing musical instruments, a parade of ceremonially garbed participants, all-you-can-drink sake, and a wooden phallus.

The festival starts with celebration and preparation at 10:00 a.m. at Tagata Jinja, where all sorts of foods and souvenirs (mostly phallus-shaped or related) are sold. Sake is also passed out freely from large wooden barrels. At about 2:00 p.m. everyone gathers at Shinmei Sha for the start of the procession. Shinto priests say prayers and impart blessings on the participants and mikoshi, as well as on the large wooden phallus, which are to be carried along the parade route.

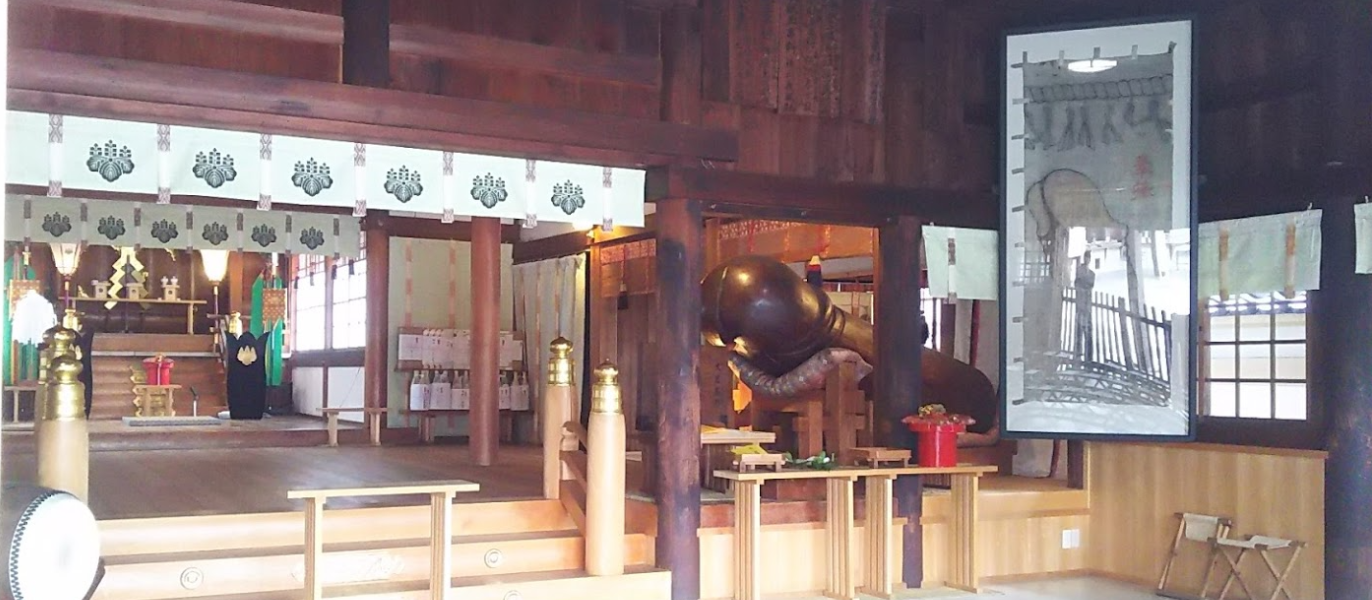
the shrine of the Youbutsu (陽物, lit. "the male object") or ō-owase-gata (大男茎形, lit. "the grand Phallus shape/ object")

The 280 kg (620 pound), 2.5 meter (96 inch)-long, 200–250 year old Japanese cypress wooden phallus called youbutsu (陽物, lit. "the male object") or ō-owase-gata (大男茎形, lit. "the grand Phallus shape/ object") is carried from a shrine called Shinmei Sha (in even-numbered years) in Komaki on a large hill or from Kumano-sha Shrine (in odd-numbered years), to a shrine called Tagata Shrine (田縣神社) in Komaki, Tagata, Aichi Prefecture.

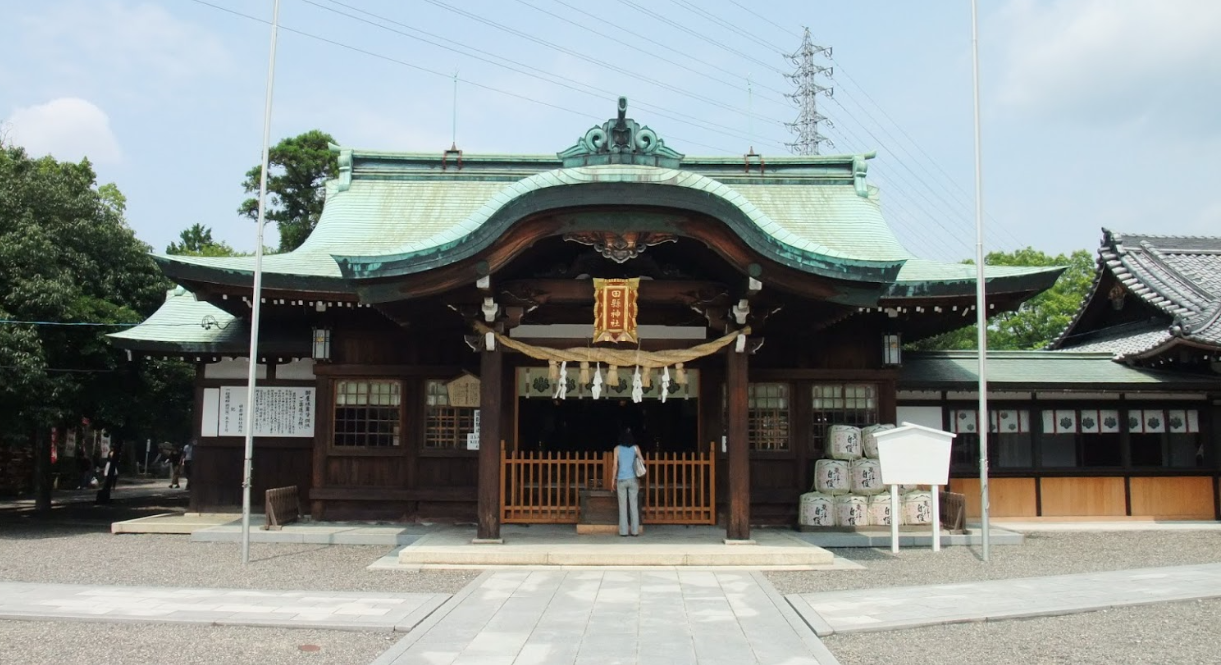
Tagata Shrine (田縣神社).

When the procession makes its way down to Tagata Shrine the phallus in its mikoshi is spun furiously before it is set down and more prayers are said. Everyone then gathers in the square outside Tagata Shrine and waits for the mochi nage, at which time the crowd is showered with small rice cakes which are thrown down by the officials from raised platforms. The festival concludes at about 4:30 p.m.

The venerated Shinto deities are Mitoshi (御歳神, Mitoshi-no-kami) and the female deity Tamahime (玉姫命, Tamahime-no-mikoto). Mitoshi is the son of the Shinto male deity Toshigami (年神), known as Ōtoshi (大歳神, Ōtoshi-no-kami) in Tagata, and is grandson of the Shinto deity Susanoo. Tamahime is a princess and the daughter of Ō'arata (大荒田命, Ō'arata-no-Mikoto), the matriarch of Owari clan (尾張氏) of her husband Takeinadane (健稲種命, Take'inadane-no-mikoto) who had two sons and four daughters. After her husband's death, she returned to his hometown Arata (situated close to Komaki), encouraged to cultivate with the help of her father Ō'arata, honor and achieved his achievements.

In Inuyama City, there is another festival Sunday before at Ōagata Shrine. This festival includes floats shaped like a vulva, which complement the phallic-shaped mikoshi used in the festival.

== See also ==
- Kanamara Matsuri
- Phallic processions

== Sources ==
- Tagata Shrine Honen Festival 田縣神社 豊年祭 (contains photos showing many of the events described above)
- Japan: Nothing says springtime like a penis festival (Global Post, March 16, 2010)
