= Kanamara Matsuri =

Annual festival in Kawasaki, Japan

Coordinates: 35°32′04″N 139°43′29″E

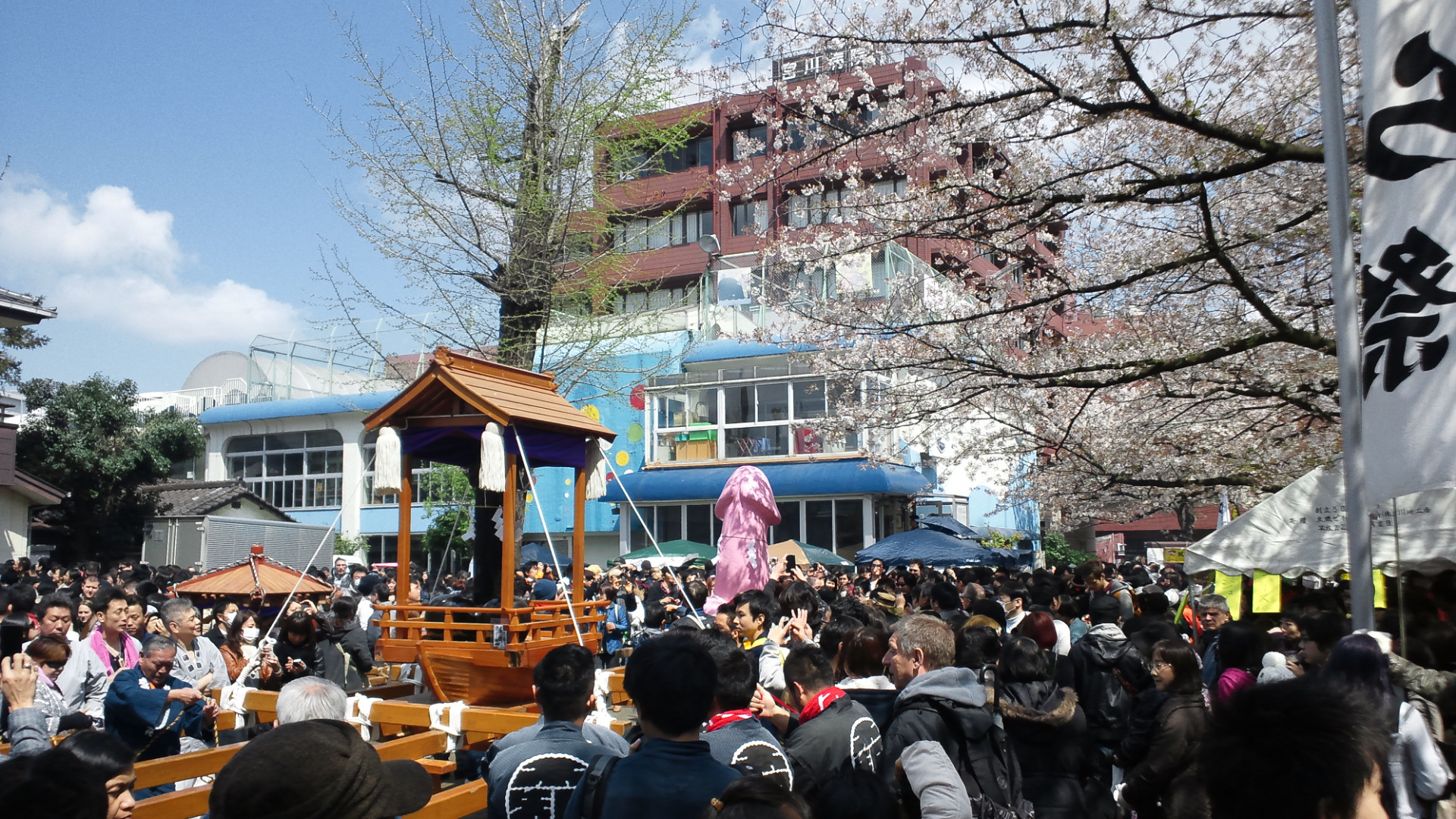
- Observed by: Kanayama shrine, Kawasaki, Japan
- Type: Religious
- Date: First Sunday in April
- 2025 date: April 6
- 2026 date: April 5
- 2027 date: April 4
- 2028 date: April 2
- Duration: 1 day
- Frequency: annual

The Shinto Kanamara Matsuri (かなまら祭り, "Festival of the Steel Phallus") is an annual Japanese festival held each spring at the Kanayama Shrine (金山神社, Kanayama-jinja) in Kawasaki, Japan. The exact dates vary: the main festivities fall on the first Sunday in April. The phallus, as the central theme of the event, is reflected in illustrations, candy, carved vegetables, decorations, and a mikoshi parade. The shrine is part of the Wakamiya Hachimangu Shrine and located near Kawasaki-Daishi Station.

The Kanamara Matsuri is centered on the Kanayama Shrine where the god Kanayama-hiko and the goddess Kanayama-hime are venerated. They are both gods of blacksmithing, metalsmithing, and metal works, and are also prayed to for easy childbirth, marital harmony, and protection from sexually transmitted infections.

The festival started in 1969. Today, it has become something of a tourist attraction and is used to raise money for HIV research.

== Mikoshi ==
At the Kanamara Festival, three portable shrines, "Kanamara Mikoshi," "Kanayama Boat Mikoshi," and "Elizabeth Mikoshi," are patrolled.

Kanamara Mikoshi
A portable shrine with a square base and a roof. A wooden phallus is housed inside. The oldest of the three portable shrines.
Kanamara Boat Mikoshi
A portable shrine with a boat-shaped base and a roof. Inside, a glowing black iron phallus is housed upwards. It was donated by Hitachi Zosen.
Elizabeth Mikoshi
A portable shrine with a huge pink dildo on the base. There is no roof. This portable shrine was donated by the crossdressing club (女装クラブ) "Elizabeth Kaikan" in Asakusabashi. The other two portable shrines are mainly carried by local parishioners, while the bearers are mainly women, who chant "Kanamara". In 2016 this shrine switched to being displayed on a wheeled trolley. In 2017, the cruising on the road was revived, but it was a one-way trip to Daishi Park, and after being covered with a white cloth in the park, it was pushed back to the shrine.

== Gallery ==
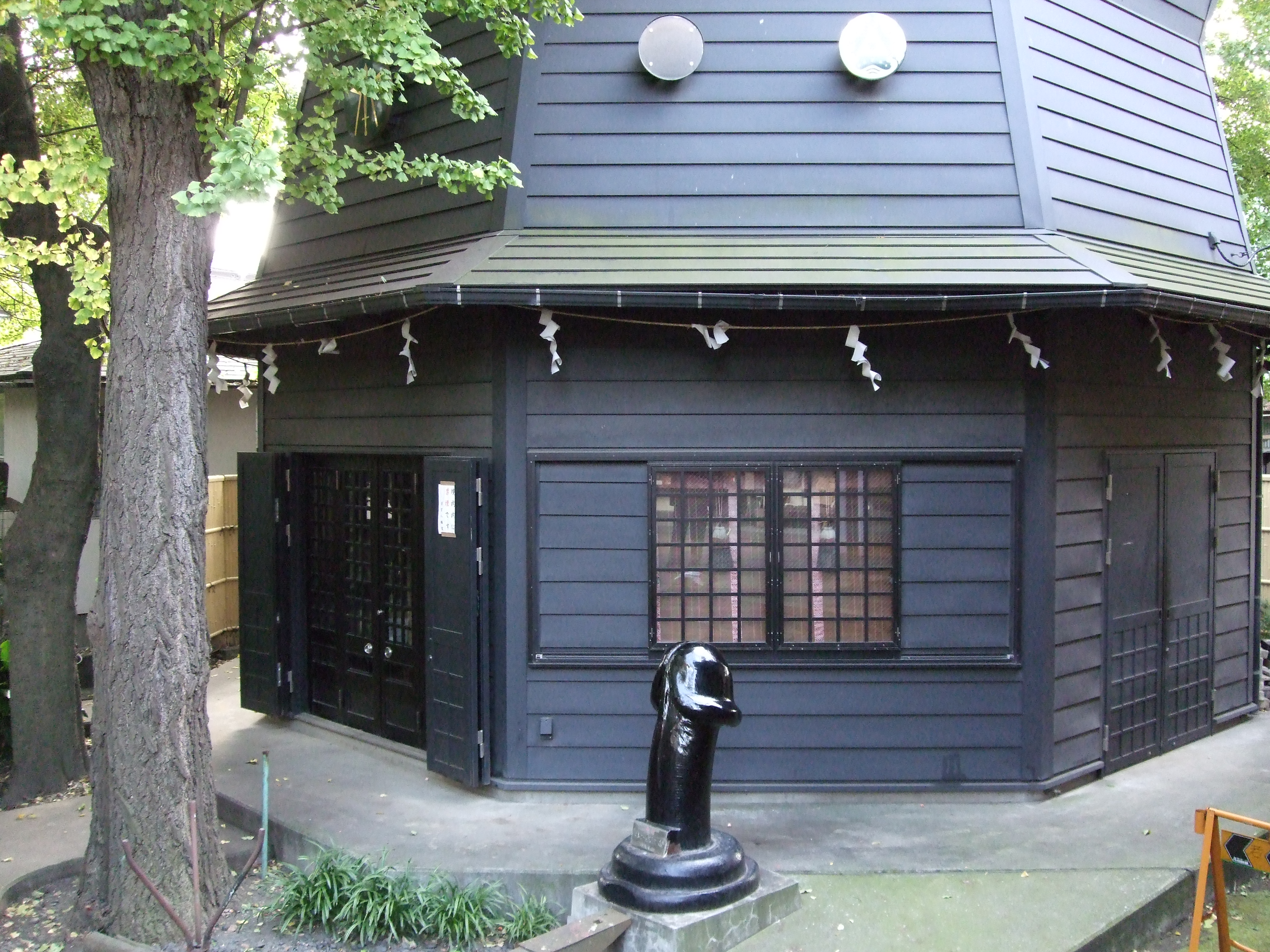
Kanayama Shrine

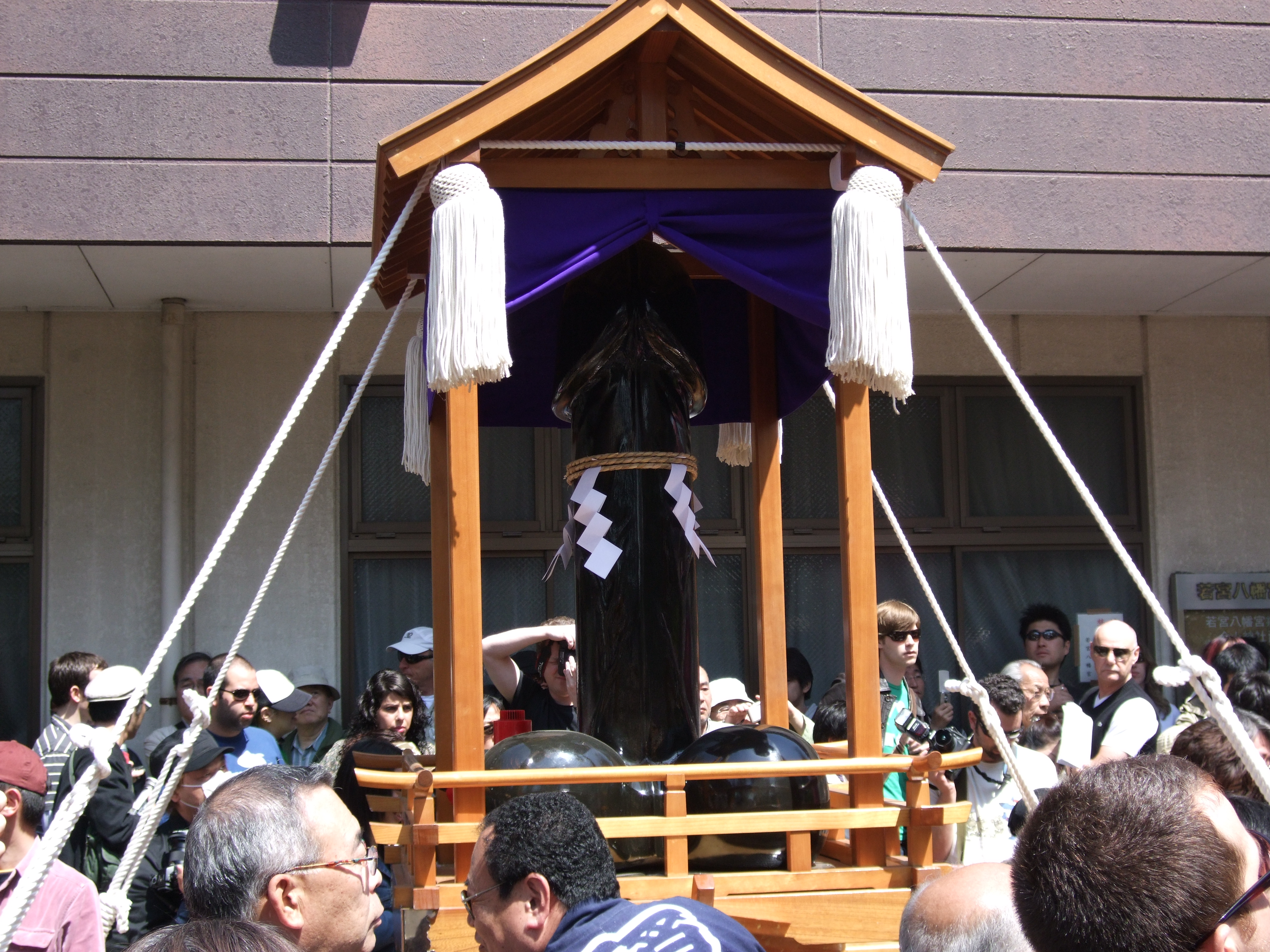
Kanamara mikoshi

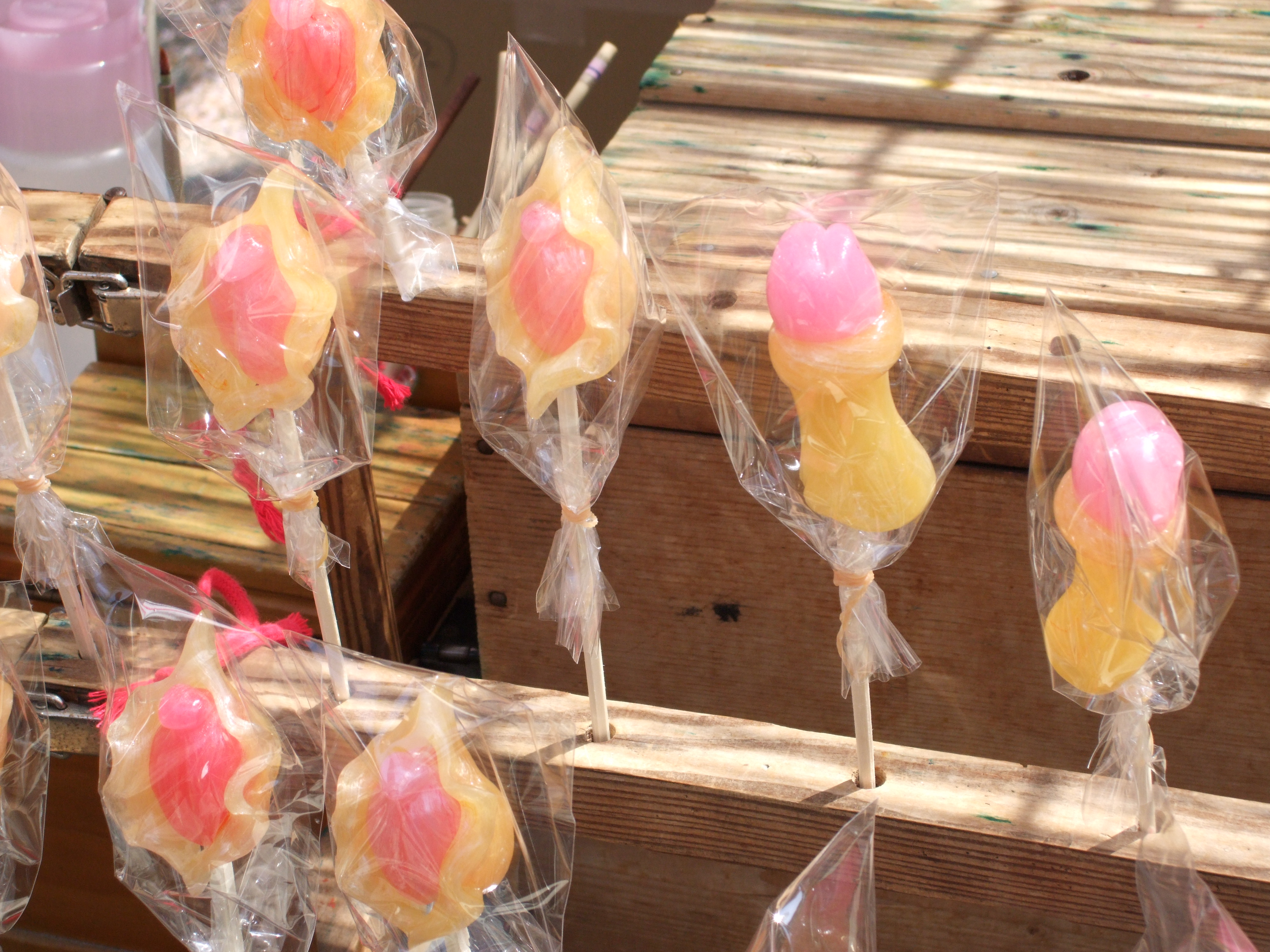
Candies shaped like penises and vulvas

== See also ==
- Hōnen Matsuri (Harvest Festival), whose main features include a 2.5 meter-long wooden phallus
- Phallic processions
- Tyrnavos, a city in Greece that holds an annual phallus festival
- Ōkunitama Shrine (friendship shrine)
