= Phallic processions =

Public celebrations featuring a phallus

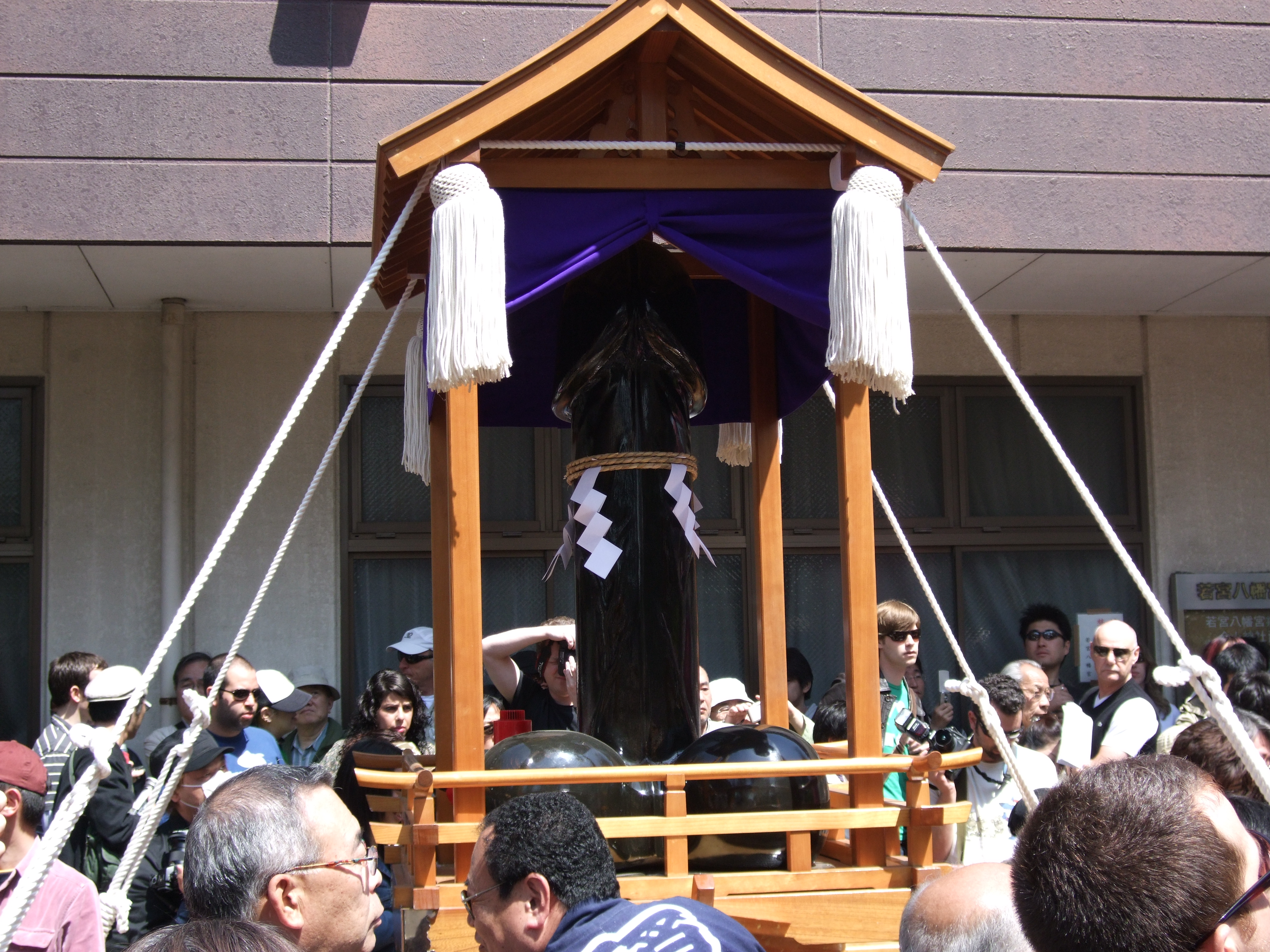
Steel and fiberglass phallus mikoshi (parade floats) (in the foreground and back right, respectively) at Kanamara Matsuri in Kawasaki, Japan. These are two of the three matsuri carried in the festival.

Phallic processions are public celebrations featuring a phallus, a representation of an erect penis.

== Ancient Greece ==
Called phallika in ancient Greece, these processions were a common feature of Dionysiac celebrations; they advanced to a cult center, and were characterized by obscenities and verbal abuse. The display of a fetishized phallus was a common feature. In a famous passage in chapter 4 of the Poetics, Aristotle formulated the hypothesis that the earliest forms of comedy originated and evolved from "those who lead off the phallic processions", which were still common in many towns at his time.

== Modern Greece ==
The city of Tyrnavos holds an annual festival, a traditional phallophoric event on the first days of Lent.

In August 2000, to promote a production of Aristophanes' The Clouds, a traditional Greek phallic procession was organized, with a 25-foot (7.6 m) long phallus paraded by the cast with the accompaniment of Balkan music; the phallic device was banned by the staff of the Edinburgh Festival.

== Japan ==
Similar parades of Shinto origin have long been part of the rich traditions of matsuri (Japanese festivals). Although the practice is no longer common, a few, such as Kawasaki's Kanamara Matsuri and Komaki's Hōnen Matsuri, continue to this day. Typically, the phallus is placed in a mikoshi, a portable Shinto shrine.

== See also ==
- Fertility rite
- Kukeri
- Liberalia (Roman festival)

== Bibliography ==
- Richardson, N. J., The Homeric Hymn to Demeter. Oxford, 1974, pp. 214–15
- O’Higgins, Laurie, Women and Humor in Classical Greece. Cambridge, 2003. p. 57
- For the outrageous practice of "abuse from the wagons" see Fluck, H., Skurrile Riten in griechischen Kulten. Diss. Freiburg. Endingen, 1931., pp. 34–51
- Pickard-Cambridge, Arthur, Dithyramb, Tragedy, and Comedy. 2nd edition, rev. by T.B.L. Webster. Cambridge, 1962.
- Reckford, Kenneth, Aristophanes’ Old-and-New Comedy. Chapel Hill, 1987. pp. 463–65
- Rosen, Ralph M. (2006). Comic Aischrology and the Urbanization of Agroikia. pp. 219–238. Archived from the original on July 17, 2010.
- The Problem of Origins in Cornford, F. M. the Origin of Attic Comedy. Ed. T. H. Gaster. Intro Jeffrey Henderson. Ann Arbor: U of MI P, 1993.
- Eric Csapo Riding the Phallus for Dionysus: Iconology, Ritual, and Gender-Role De/Construction Phoenix, Vol. 51, No. 3/4 (Autumn–Winter, 1997), pp. 253–295 doi:10.2307/1192539
