= Kasugai =

Kasugai may refer to:

- Kasugai, Aichi, a city in Japan
- Kasugai, Yamanashi, a town in Japan
- Kasugai (snack company), a Japanese snack company
- Kasugai Station (disambiguation)
- Nishikasugai
