= Kachigawa Station =

Railway station in Kasugai, Aichi Prefecture, Japan

CF06 Kachigawa Station 勝川駅
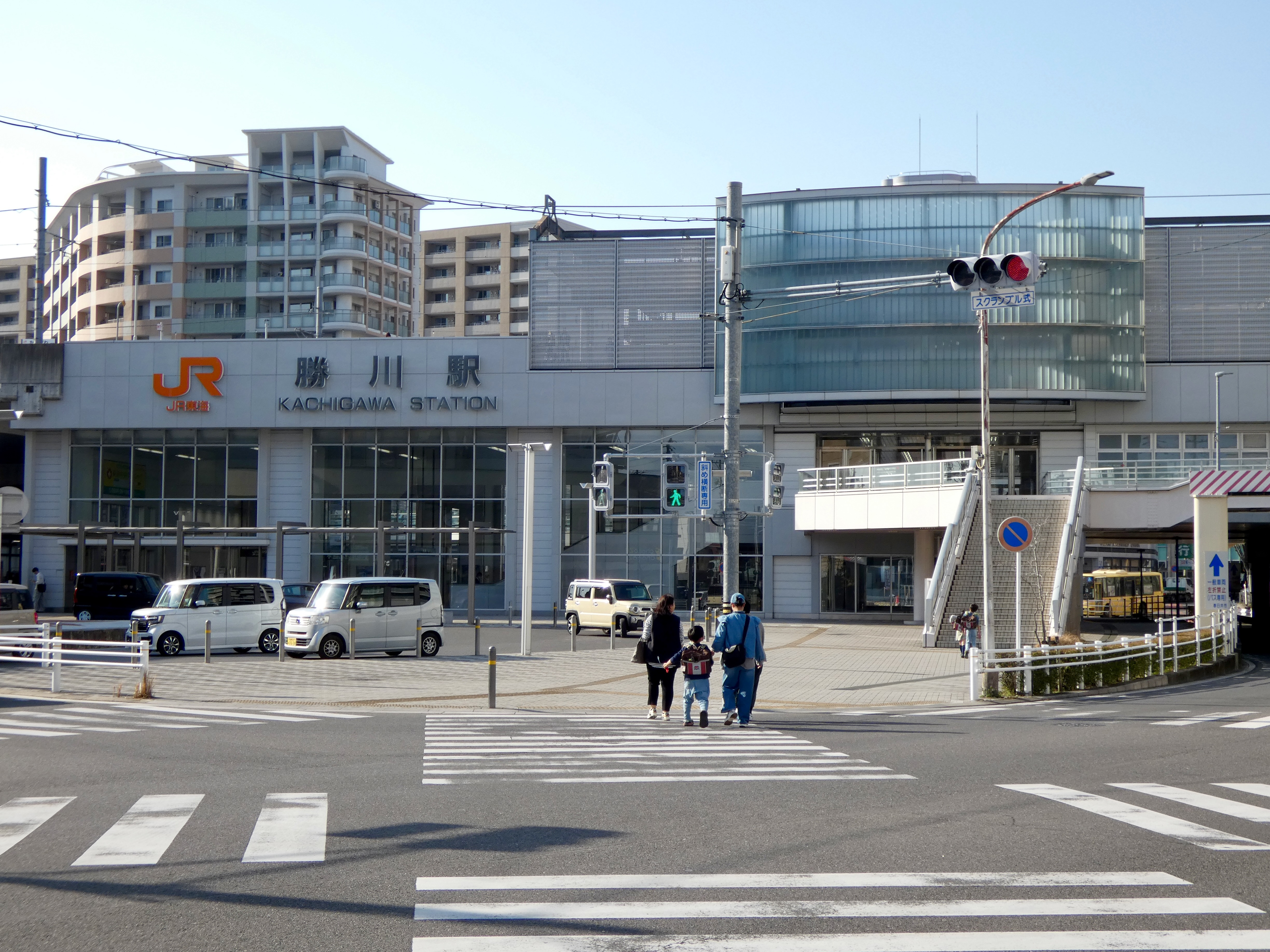
- JR Kachigawa Station, April 2011

General information
- Location: 6-1 Matsushin-chō, Kasugai-shi, Aichi-ken 486-0931; Japan
- Coordinates: 35°13′48″N 136°57′23″E
- Operator: JR Central
- Line: Chūō Main Line
- Distance: 381.9 kilometers from Tokyo
- Platforms: 2 side platforms

Other information
- Status: Staffed
- Station code: CF06

History
- Opened: 25 July 1900; 126 years ago

Passengers
- FY2017: 17,579
Location
- Location within Aichi Prefecture Location within Japan

Kachigawa Station 勝川駅
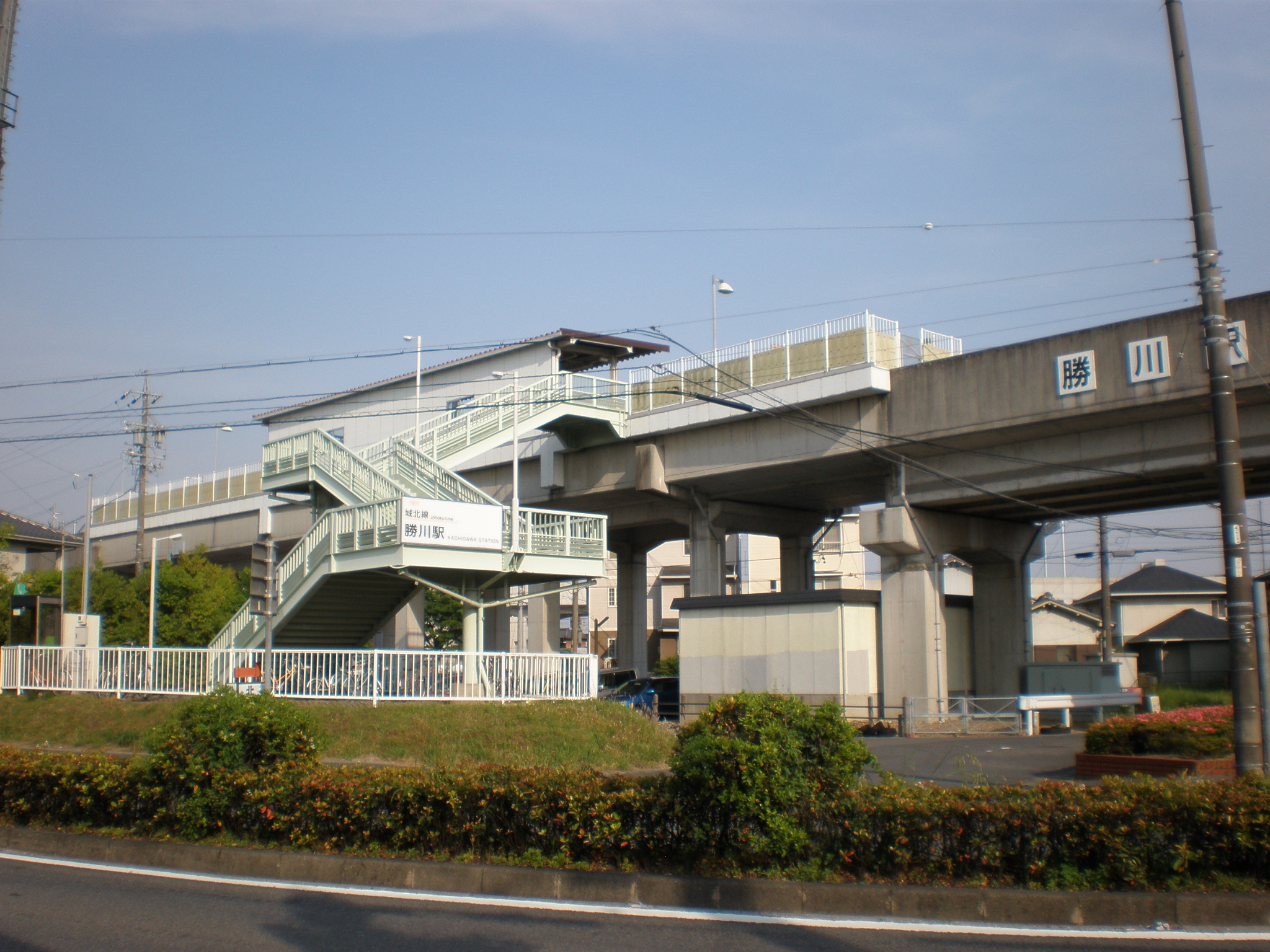
- TKJ Kachigawa Station in May 2009

General information
- Location: 5 Chome Kachigawa-cho, Kasugai-shi, Aichi-ken 486-0945; Japan
- Coordinates: 35°13′39″N 136°57′6″E
- Operator: TKJ
- Line: ■ Jōhoku Line
- Distance: 1.8 kilometers from Ajiyoshi
- Platforms: 1 side platform

Other information
- Status: Unstaffed

History
- Opened: 1 December 1991

Passengers
- FY2017: 238
Location

Kachigawa Station (勝川駅, Kachigawa-eki) is the name of two different railway stations in the city of Kasugai, Aichi Prefecture, Japan. One is operated by Central Japan Railway Company (JR Central) the other by the JR-Central Transport Service Company (TKJ).

== Lines ==
Kachigawa Station is served by the Chūō Main Line, and is located 381.9 kilometers from the starting point of the line at Tokyo Station and 15.0 kilometers from Nagoya Station. It is also the eastern terminus of the TKJ Jōhoku Line and is 11.2 kilometers from the western terminus at Biwajima Station.

== Station layout (JR) ==
The JR station has two elevated opposed side platforms with the station building underneath. The station building has automated ticket machines, TOICA automated turnstiles and a staffed ticket office.

=== Platforms ===
1	■ Chūō Main Line	For Tajimi, Nakatsugawa
2	■ Chūō Main Line	For Nagoya

== Station layout (TKJ) ==
The TKJ station consists of one elevated side platform located 500 meters to the west of the JR station. The station is unattended with no turnstiles or facilities, but tickets can be purchased from the nearby JR station or fares paid on the train instead.

=== Platforms ===
1	■ Jōhoku Line	For Biwajima

== Adjacent stations ==
«	Service	»
JR Central
Chūō Main Line
Home Liner: Does not stop at this station
Central Liner: Does not stop at this station
Kasugai	Rapid	Ōzone
Kasugai	Local	Shin-Moriyama
JR-Central Transport Service Company
Jōhoku Line
Terminus	Local	Ajiyoshi

== Station history ==
Kachigawa Station was opened on 25 July 1900. Along with the division and privatization of JNR on 1 April 1987, the station came under the control and operation of the Central Japan Railway Company. The TKJ Jōhoku Line began operations from 1 December 1991. The tracks were elevated in 2009 and a new JR station building was completed in 2010.

== Passenger statistics ==
In fiscal 2017, the JR portion of the station was used by an average of 17,579 passengers daily (arriving passengers only) and the TKJ portion by 238.

== Surrounding area ==
- Japan National Route 19
- Jōjō Castle
