= Ajiyoshi Futagoyama Kofun =

Kofun period burial mound in Kasugai, Japan

- 二子山古墳 (Japanese)
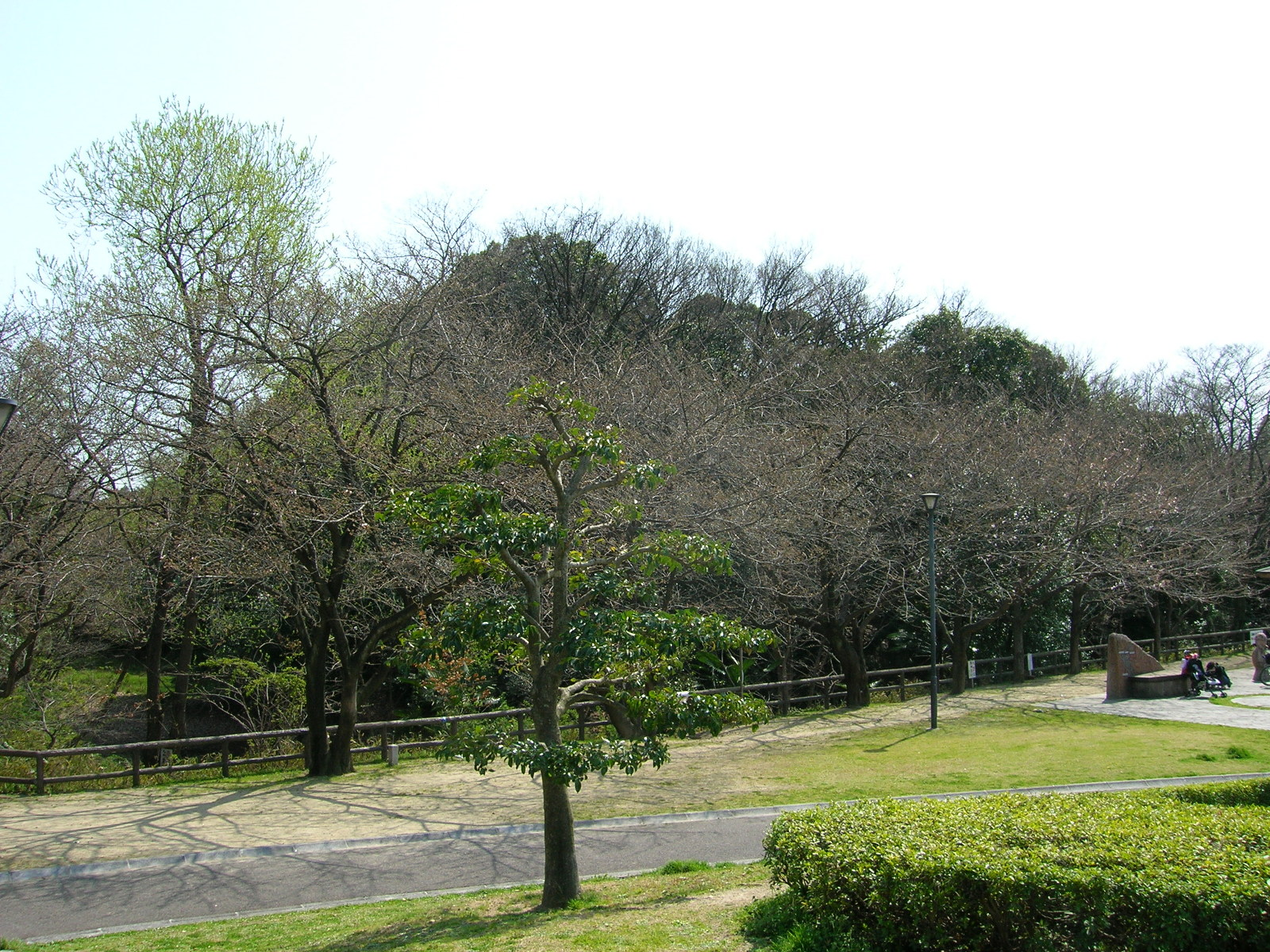
- Ajiyoshi Futagoyama Kofun

- Ajiyoshi Futagoyama Kofun Ajiyoshi Futagoyama Kofun (Japan)
- 35°13′33″N 136°56′12″E
- Type: Kofun
- Periods: Kofun period
- Location: Kasugai, Aichi, Japan
- Region: Tōkai region

Site notes
- Public access: Yes (on site museum)

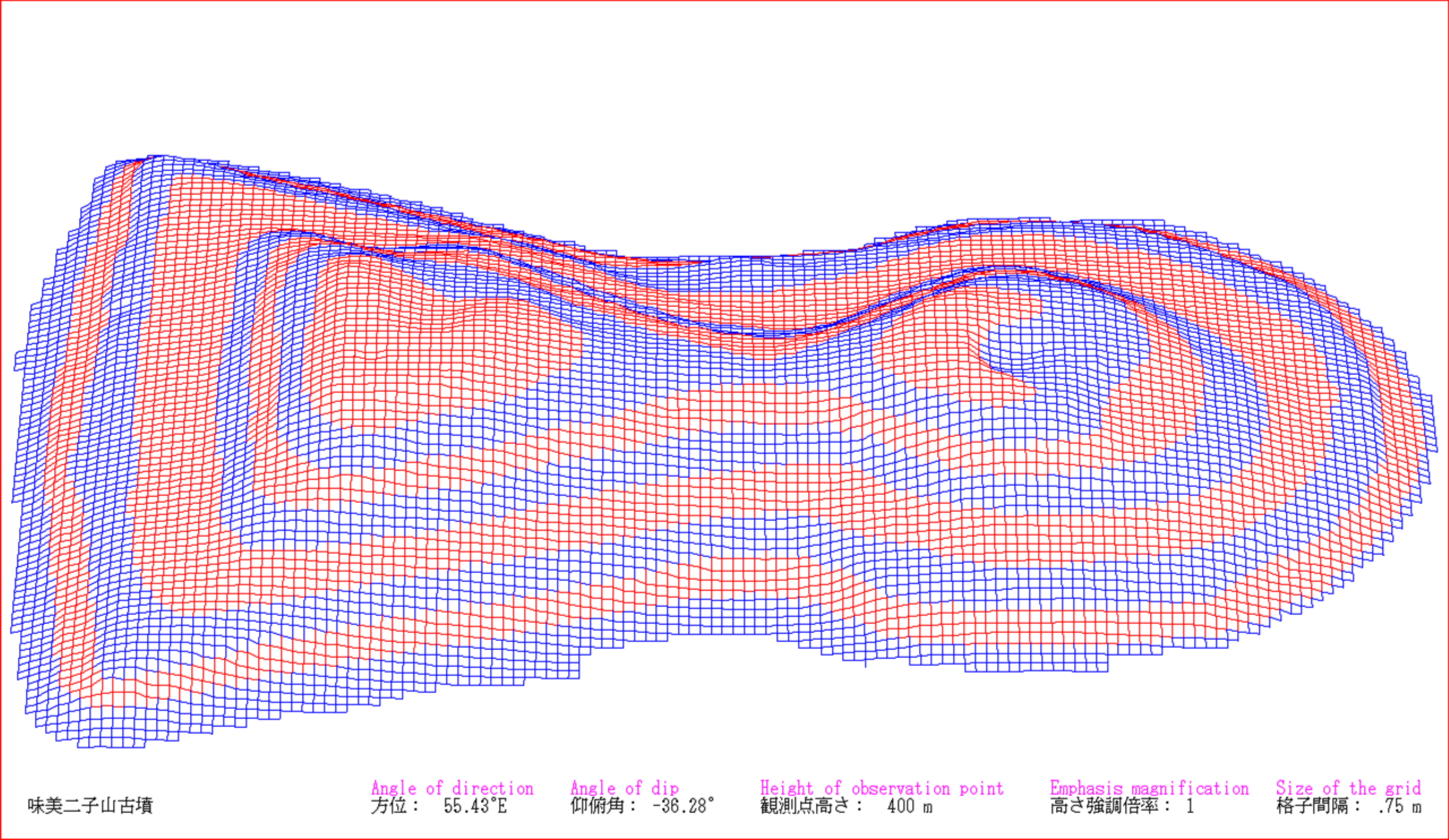
CG of Futagoyama Kofun

Ajiyoshi Futagoyama Kofun (味美二子山古墳) is a Kofun period keyhole-shaped burial mound, located in the Futago neighborhood of the city of Kasugai, Aichi in the Tōkai region of Japan. The tumulus was designated a National Historic Site of Japan in 1936. It is the largest of a cluster of kofun, including the Ajiyoshi Hakusan Jinja Kofun and the Gotosho Kofun, which together with the Ajiyoshi Kasugayama Kofun located about 500 meters to the northwest, forms the Ajiyoshi Kofun Cluster.

== Overview ==
The Ajiyoshi Futagoyama Kofun is a zenpō-kōen-fun (前方後円墳), which is shaped like a keyhole, having one square end and one circular end, when viewed from above. With a length of 96 meters and a height of six meters, it is estimated to have been constructed in the middle of the 6th century AD. The tumulus was constructed in two tiers, and is orientated 30 degrees to the northwest. The tumulus had a structure on the northeast side, possibly a ceremonial platform, and was originally surrounded by a shield-shaped moat.

The tumulus was burglarized in a large scale in the Meiji period. Per an archaeological excavation in 1935, a hollow with a diameter of four to five meters was found in the posterior circular portion, which is where the burial chamber was probably located, but no sarcophagus or grave goods could be found. In 1967, a Japan Air Self-Defense Force training aircraft crashed next to the kofun, causing considerable damage. During the restoration work, numerous haniwa were found, some in the forms of horses, people, waterfowl, etc., in addition to the more common cylindrical varieties. Penetration into the interior of the kofun was hampered by seepage of ground water, and subsequent work was suspended. In 1991, further excavations were conducted in conjunction with the construction of the surrounding Futagoyama Park, resulting in the discovery of more artifacts, including more haniwa and examples of Mino ware and Sue ware pottery. Fluorescent X-ray analysis revealed that this pottery had been fired at the Shinohara ancient kiln site eight kilometers to the north.

A small museum, the Haniwa no Yakata (ハニワの館), has been built at the site to house these items. It is located about 10 minutes on foot from JR-Central Transport Service Jōhoku Line Ajiyoshi Station.

Total length
96 meters:
Anterior rectangular portion
54 meters long x 45 meters wide
Constriction width
38 meters
Posterior circular portion
48 meter diameter x 8 meters high

== See also ==
- List of Historic Sites of Japan (Aichi)
