= Kasugai Station =

Kasugai Station is the name of two train stations in Japan:

- Kasugai Station (JR Central)
- Kasugai Station (Meitetsu)
