= Kasugai Station (JR Central) =

Railway station in Kasugai, Aichi Prefecture, Japan

CF07 Kasugai Station 春日井駅
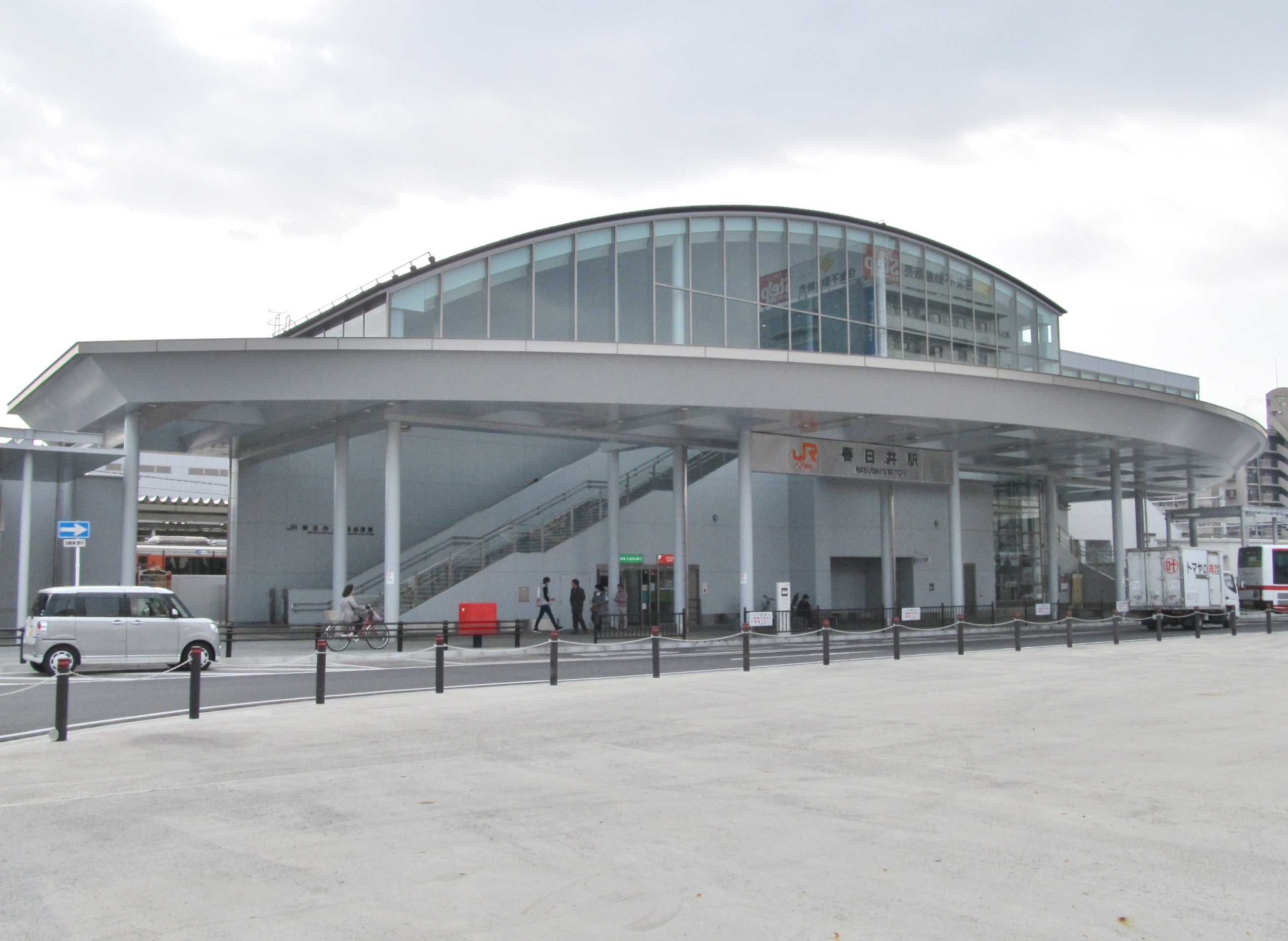
- North entrance of Kasugai Station, 2018

General information
- Location: 1-5162 Jōjōchō, Kasugai-shi, Aichi-ken 486-0833; Japan
- Coordinates: 35°14′35″N 136°59′6″E
- Operator: JR Central; JR Freight
- Line: Chūō Main Line
- Distance: 376.1 kilometers from Tokyo
- Platforms: 1 side + 1 island platform

Other information
- Status: Staffed
- Station code: CF07
- Website: Official website

History
- Opened: 16 December 1927; 98 years ago
- Former names: Toriimatsu (to 1946)

Passengers
- FY2017: 15,818 daily
Location
- Location within Aichi Prefecture Location within Japan

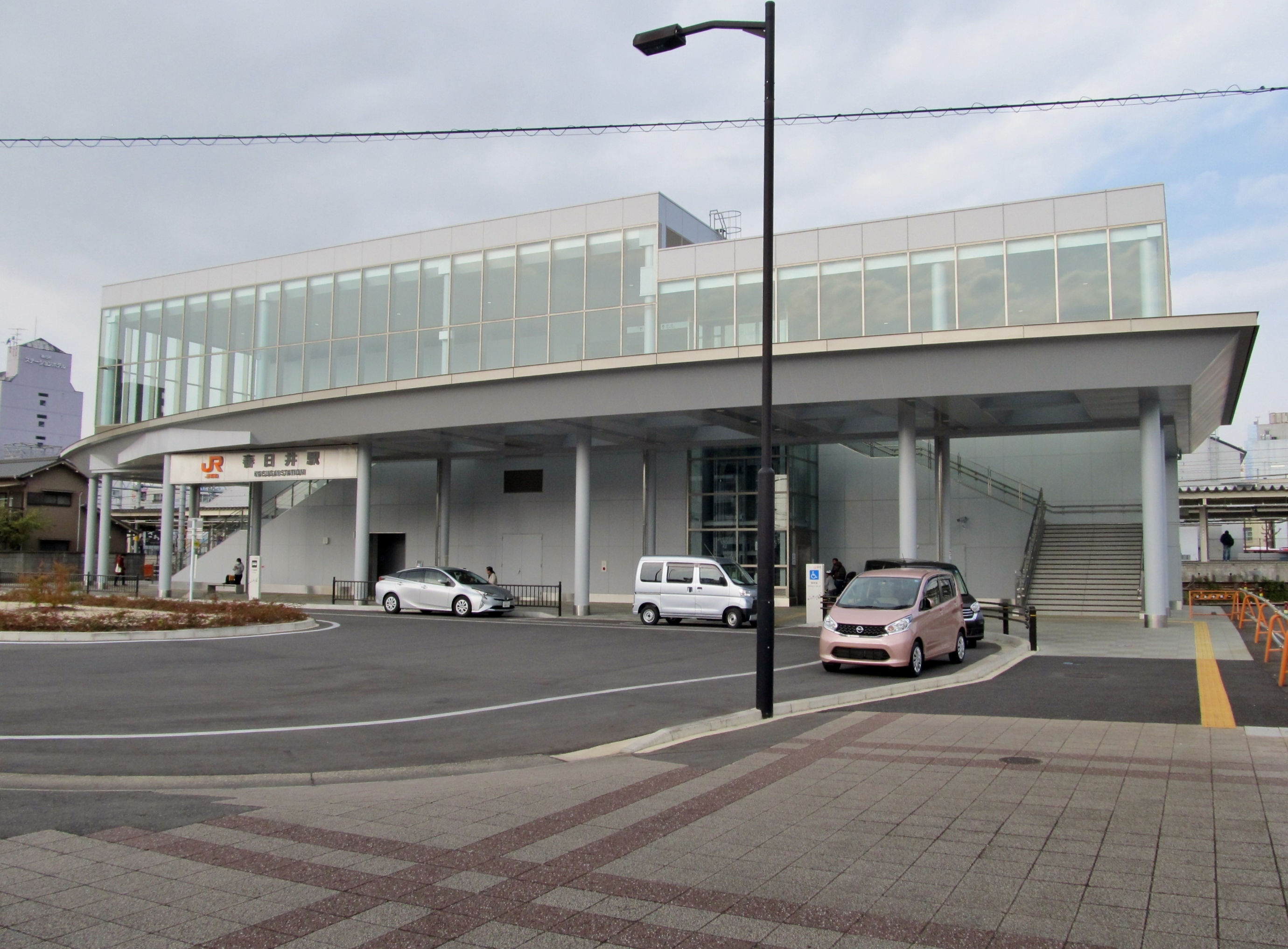
South exit

Kasugai Station (春日井駅, Kasugai-eki) is a railway station in the city of Kasugai, Aichi Prefecture, Japan, operated by Central Japan Railway Company (JR Tōkai). It is also a freight depot for the Japan Freight Railway Company (JR Freight).

== Lines ==
Kasugai Station is served by the Chūō Main Line, and is located 378.8 kilometers from the starting point of the line at Tokyo Station and 18.1 kilometers from Nagoya Station.

== Station layout ==
The station has one side platform and one island platforms connected by an elevated station building. The station building has automated ticket machines, TOICA automated turnstiles and a staffed ticket office.

=== Platforms ===
1	■ Chūō Main Line	For Tajimi, Nakatsugawa
2	■ Chūō Main Line	For Nagoya
3	■ Chūō Main Line	(not in use)

== Adjacent stations ==
«	Service	»
JR Central
Chūō Main Line
Home Liner: Does not stop at this station
Central Liner: Does not stop at this station
Kōzōji	Rapid	Kachigawa
Jinryō	Local	Kachigawa

== Station history ==
Kasugai Station was established as Toriimatsu Station (鳥居松駅) on December 16, 1927. It was renamed to its present name on May 1, 1946. Along with the division and privatization of JNR on April 1, 1987, the station came under the control and operation of the Central Japan Railway Company. A new station building was completed in 2016.

== Passenger statistics ==
In fiscal 2017, the station was used by an average of 15,818 passengers daily (arriving passengers only).

== Surrounding area ==
- Kasugai City Hall
- site of Jōjō Castle

== See also ==
- List of railway stations in Japan
