= JR-Central Transport Service Jōhoku Line =

Railway line in Aichi Prefecture, Japan

Jōhoku Line

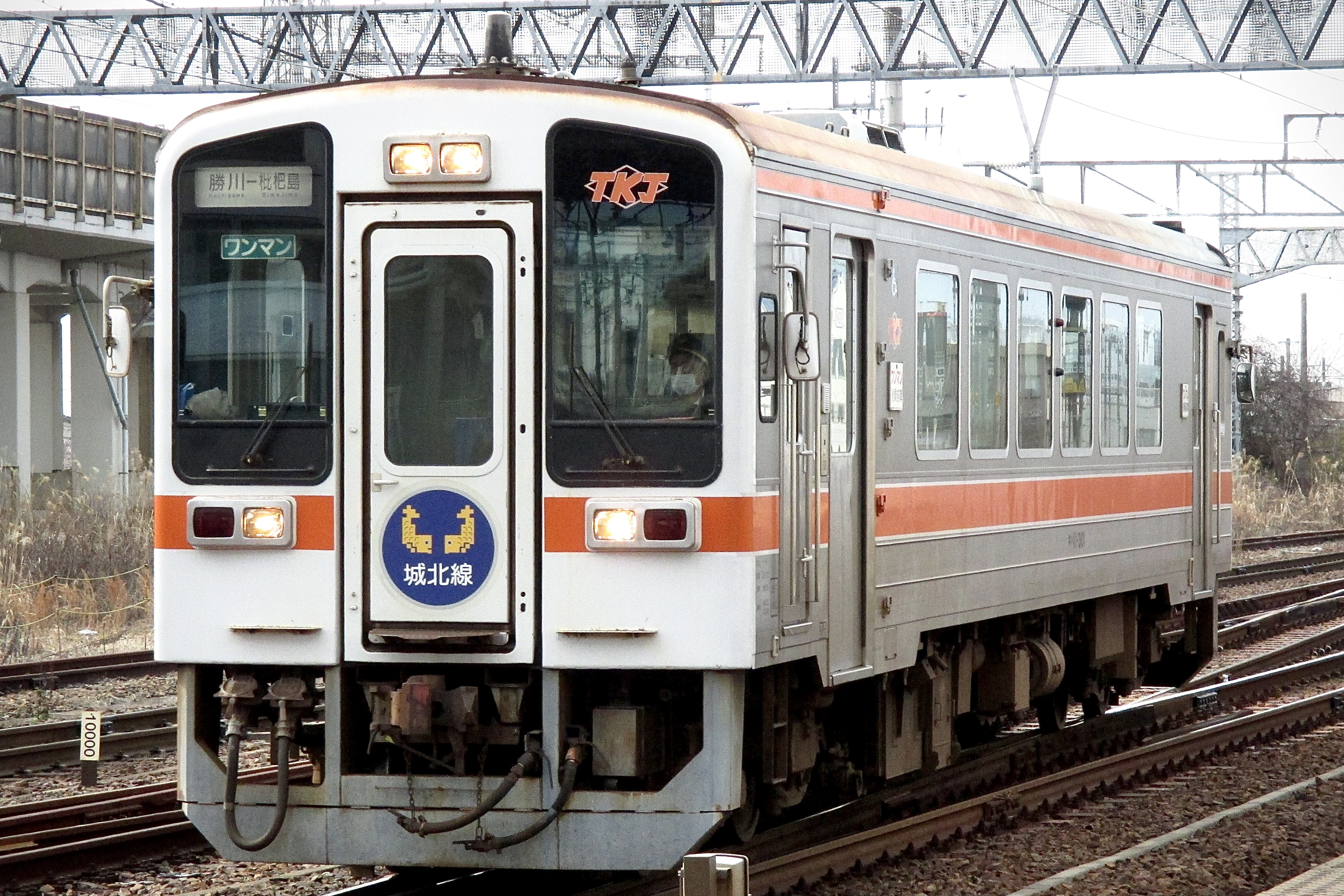
- A KiHa 11 series diesel car on the Johoku Line in March 2021

Overview
- Native name: 城北線
- Status: Operational
- Owner: JR Central
- Locale: Aichi Prefecture, Japan
- Termini: Kachigawa; Biwajima
- Stations: 6
- Website: www.tkj-i.co.jp

Service
- System: JR Central
- Operator: JR-Central Transport Service Company (TKJ)
- Rolling stock: KiHa 11 series DMU
- Daily ridership: 1,384 (FY2009)

History
- Opened: 1 December 1991; 34 years ago

Technical
- Line length: 11.2 km (7.0 mi)
- Number of tracks: Double-tracked
- Character: Urban
- Track gauge: 1,067 mm (3 ft 6 in)
- Electrification: Not electrified

The Jōhoku Line (城北線, Jōhoku-sen) is a Japanese commuter rail line between Kachigawa Station in Kasugai and Biwajima Station in Kiyosu, in Aichi Prefecture. Trains are operated by JR-Central Transport Service Company (TKJ), a wholly-owned subsidiary of JR Central. While TKJ operates the line, the rail facilities belong to its parent company, JR Central. The line is not electrified, making it the last remaining non-electrified line in the prefecture.

The line was proposed by the Railway Construction Act in 1962 as a railway line connecting Seto and Inazawa. The construction was then planned by the Japanese National Railways (JNR) in the 1960s as a freight line linking Kachigawa Station and Biwajima Station. The construction started in 1976, but had to be halted due to JNR experiencing a large deficit. The line was completed by the TKJ. The line opened in two sections, in 1991 and 1993.

Because of the line's background as a line constructed by the Japan Railway Construction Public Corporation, JR Central pays fees to Japan Railway Construction, Transport and Technology Agency (JRTT) for TKJ to run trains on the line.

Services on the line are operated with four KiHa 11 trains used separately. In the daytime, trains run once an hour, while two to three services run an hour during the morning and the evening.

== History ==
The construction of a railway connecting Seto and Inazawa was proposed in 1962, when it was listed as one of the proposed railway lines by the revised Railway Construction Act.

The line was first planned by the Japanese National Railways (JNR) in the 1960s as a freight-only line linking the Chuo Main Line at Kachigawa with the Tōkaidō Main Line at Biwajima. Construction began in March 1976, but was subsequently halted due to the huge deficit of JNR. Construction of the line resumed later as passenger lines. The line was completed, and succeeded by Tokai Transport Service. The first section of the Jōhoku Line, between Kachigawa and Owari-Hoshinomiya, opened on 1 December 1991. The section between Owari-Hoshinomiya and Biwajima opened on 18 March 1993.

== Operation and services ==
All trains stop at all stations and there are no limited stop rapid services. Services operate once per hour in the daytime, and two or three times per hour in the morning and evening. Travel time is 16 minutes toward Biwajima and 17 minutes toward Kachigawa. Only a single car is used for each service.

The line is currently operated by TKJ. When the line was under construction, all JNR lines were constructed by the Japan Railway Construction Public Corporation (JRCPC), which let JNR operate trains on the line in return for fee payments covering the construction cost. When the payment ends, the lines are usually transferred to JNR. As a result of JNR's dissolution and JR Central taking over the line, the company cancelled construction on the line to reduce the amount of fee they had to pay. This led to the line lacking a direct connection to JR Kachigawa Station, old Shinkansen rails being used, and not being electrified. The payment to Japan Railway Construction, Transport and Technology Agency (JRTT), JRCPC's successor, is set to end in 2032, when ownership of the facility of the line will be passed on from JRTT to JR Central.

=== Fares and ticketing ===
Despite being a subsidiary of JR Central, the Jōhoku Line has its own separate fare scale and does not accept the Japan Rail Pass or any other JR ticket or pass. Single-ride fares are either 230, 320, 390, or 450 yen for adults; and 120, 160, 200, or 230 yen for children, and can be purchased using cash from the JR ticket machines at Kachigawa and Biwajima Stations or onboard the train. Smart cards, such as TOICA, manaca, and Suica, are not accepted on the Johoku Line.

Commuter passes (for one, three, or six months) and coupon tickets (11 tickets for the price of 10) can be purchased from the JR ticket machines at Kachigawa and Biwajima Stations for travel to and from those stations or at the Jōhoku Line Ticket Office near Otai Station for other stations.

== Infrastructure ==
The 11.2 km (7.0 mi) line is entirely double-tracked. While the line is not electrified, concrete bases to allow the installation of overhead catenary poles are present on the line. The line is a narrow-gauge railway with a track gauge of 1,067 mm (42.0 in). The entire line is elevated with viaducts, and railroad ties made out of prestressed concrete are used.

=== Rolling stock ===
The line is operated using a fleet of four KiHa 11 single-car diesel multiple units (DMU). When the line first opened, services were operated using KiHa 40 series single-car DMUs leased from JR Central. These were painted in the TJK livery of cream with an orange window band.

Until April 2015, the fleet consisted of four KiHa 11-200 series cars (KiHa 11-201–204) based at Kachigawa Depot. Two of these (KiHa 11-203 and 204) were sold to the Hitachinaka Kaihin Railway in Ibaraki Prefecture in April 2015. KiHa 11-201 was withdrawn from Johoku Line services on 23 September 2015, and sold to the Hitachinaka Kaihin Railway. It was replaced on 24 September 2015 by KiHa 11-300 series car KiHa 11-301, purchased from JR Central. The remaining KiHa 11-200 series car (KiHa 11-202) was scheduled to be replaced by a KiHa 11-300 series car in 2016.

=== Future connections with Kachigawa Station ===
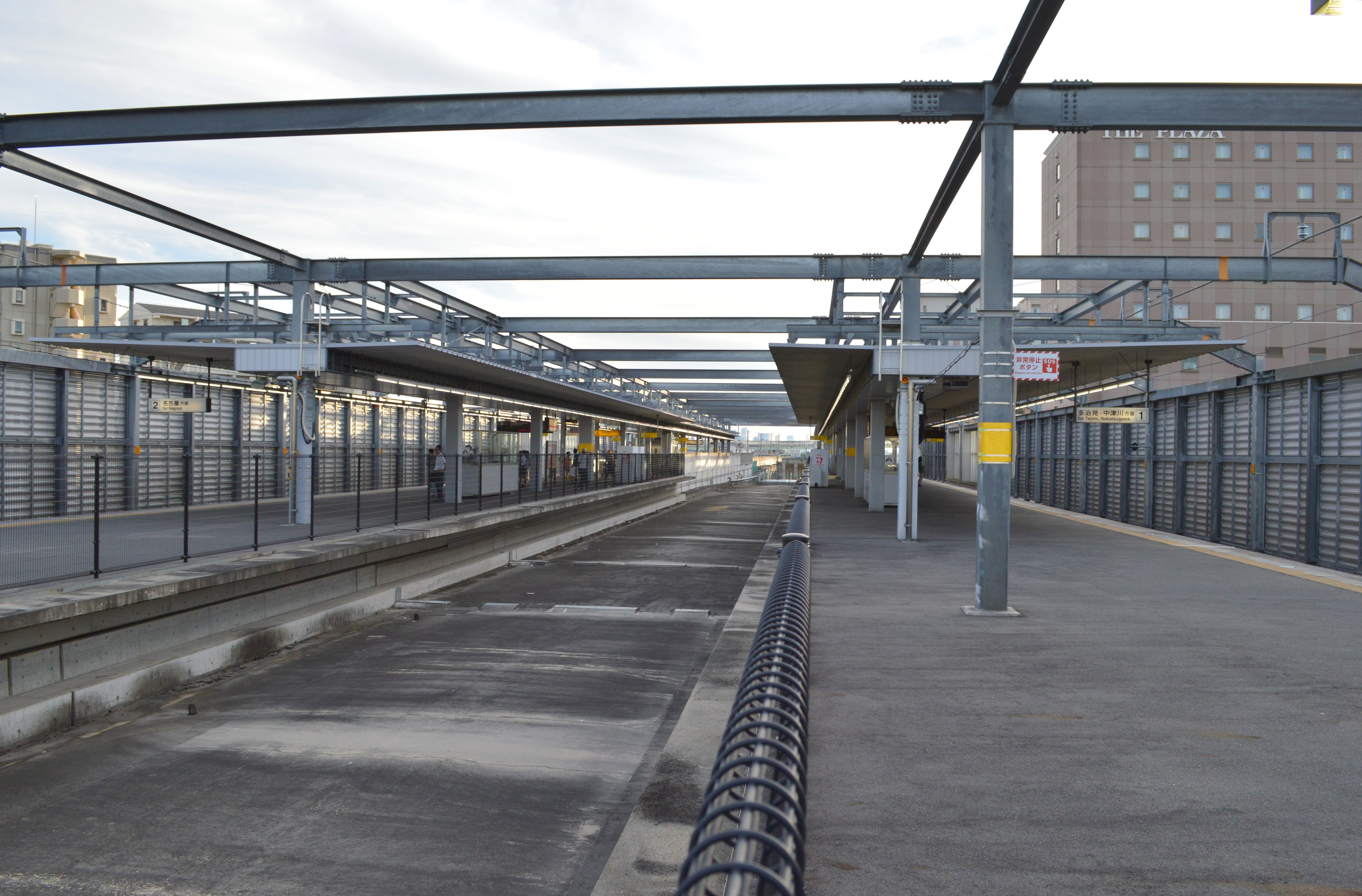
The open space between the platforms in Kachigawa Station

The line was originally planned to directly connect with the JR Chuo Line's Kachigawa Station in 2009, although this was not done. The operating company TKJ and the related JR Central refuse to upgrade the infrastructure of the line, citing lack of profitability. Currently, the line's Kachigawa Station is about 500 metres (1,600 ft) away from the Chuo Line, and has an empty space between the two island platforms for the line's future direct connection with the Johoku Line.

=== Stations ===
Station	Image	Japanese	Distance from Kachigawa (km)	Transfers	Notes	Location
Kachigawa		勝川	-	Chūō Main Line	Kachigawa Station is 500 m (1,600 ft) away from the Chuo Line's Kachigawa Station.	Kasugai
Ajiyoshi		味美	1.8			Kasugai
Hira		比良	4.5			Nishi-ku, Nagoya
Otai		小田井	6.7	Nagoya Subway Tsurumai Line (Kami-Otai T01 ) Meitetsu Inuyama Line (Kami-Otai)		Nishi-ku, Nagoya
Owari-Hoshinomiya		尾張星の宮	9.3			Kiyosu
Biwajima		枇杷島	11.2	Tōkaidō Main Line		Kiyosu

=== Passenger statistics ===
Station	Passengers (2022)
Kachigawa	490
Owari-Hoshinomiya	463
Otai	387
Ajiyoshi	239
Hira	218
Biwajima	No data

== See also ==
- List of railway lines in Japan
- Aichi Loop Line
