= Higashikasugai District =

Former district in Aichi prefecture, Japan

Higashikasugai (東春日井郡, Higashikasugai-gun) was a district located on the northeastern Owari Region in Aichi, Japan.

== History ==
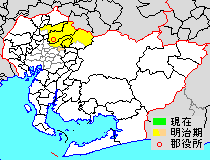
Map showing original extent of Higashikasugai District in Aichi Prefecture: * yellow - areas formerly within the district borders during the early Meiji period

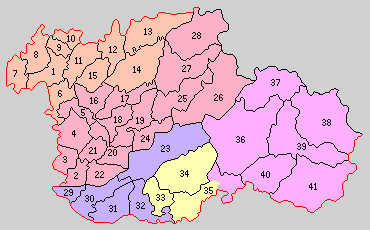
Colored areas are in this district.

Historically the district formerly included most of the current cities of Komaki, Kasugai, Seto, and Owariasahi.

=== District Timeline ===
- February 5, 1880 - Kasugai District was split off into Higashikasugai and Nishikasugai Districts during the early Meiji period establishment of the municipalities system, which initially consisted of 109 villages. Its district headquarters was located at the village of Kachigawa (Katsukawa).
- October 1, 1889 - With the establishment of the municipalities system in effect, Higashikasugai District consisted of one town and 40 villages.
- April 1, 1891 - The establishment of the district/county system was implemented.
- January 29, 1892 - The village of Seto gained town status. (2 towns, 39 villages)
- October 24, 1892 - Parts of the village of Kokorozashidan (Shidan) [the section of Kamishidami] split off to become the village of Kamishidami. (2 towns, 40 villages)
- March 28, 1893 - The village of Kachigawa (Katsukawa) gained town status. (3 towns, 39 villages)
- January 23, 1894 - Parts of the village of Sakai [the sections of Mama and Mamaharashinden] split off to become the village of Mama. (3 towns, 40 villages)
- April 18, 1894 - The village of Sakai absorbed parts of the village of Watari [the section of Nishinoshima].
- May 1902 - The district office was relocated to the town of Kachigawa [the section of Hamagayashiki].
- July 16, 1906 - The following towns and villages were implemented with the following mergers: (4 towns, 12 villages)
  - the town of Kachigawa: the former town of Kachigawa, and the former villages of Ajiyoshi (Ayimi), Kasugai and Kashiwai
  - the village of Toriimatsu: the former villages of Ono and Waniryō (Warera)
  - the village of Takaki (Takagi): the former villages of Taraga (Dengaku) and Katayama
  - the village of Shinogi (Shinoki): the former villages of Shimohara (Shimobaru), Yahata (Yawata), Ogita (Okita) and most of Hinago [the sections of Horinouchi, Kumano, Sakurasa and Shinryō]
  - the village of Kōzōji: the former villages of Fuji (Funi), Tamagawa (Tamakawa) and parts of Hinago [the section of Ōdome]
  - the village of Sakashita (Sakashimo): the former villages of Misaka (Kamisaka) and Utsutsu (Uchitsu)
  - the town of Komaki-chō: the former town of Komaki, and the former villages of Toyama, Shinshin (Mashi), Sakai and Watari (Kazutari)
  - the village of Ajioka: the former villages of Ajioka, Iwasaki and Kuboishiki
  - the village of Shinooka: the former villages of Ōkusa, Ōno, Ikebayashi (Chibayashi) and Sue
  - the village of Asahi: the former villages of Shirushiba (Inba), Nii (Arai) and Happaku (Hachiro)
  - the village of Shinano: the former villages of Shimoshinano, Kamishinano and Kakegawa
  - the town of Moriyama: the former villages of Takama, Nijō, Obata and Ōmori
  - the village of Shidami: the former villages of Kokorozashidan (Shidan) and Kamishidami
- May 1913 - The district office was relocated to the town of Kachigawa [the section of Higashihanda (Higashihattayama)].
- April 1, 1923 - The district council was abolished, while the district office remained.
- January 1, 1924 - The village of Shinano gained town status. (5 towns, 11 villages)
- August 26, 1925 - The villages of Akatsu and parts of Asahi [the sections of Ima and Minonoike] were merged into the town of Seto. (5 towns, 10 villages)
- July 1, 1926 - The district office was abolished, thus the area remained for geographic purposes.
- November 1, 1928 - The village of Sakashita (Sakashimo) gained town status. (6 towns, 9 villages)
- October 1, 1929 - The town of Seto gained city status, thus leaving the district. (5 towns, 9 villages)
- January 1, 1930 - The village of Kōzōji gained town status. (6 towns, 8 villages)
- June 1, 1943 - The town of Kachigawa (Katsukawa) merged with the villages of Takaki (Takagi), Shinogi (Shinoki) and Toriimatsu to form the city of Kasugai, thus leaving the district. (5 towns, 5 villages)
- August 5, 1948 - The village of Asahi gained town status. (6 towns, 4 villages)
- May 3, 1951 - The village of Mizuno was merged into the city of Seto. (6 towns, 3 villages)
- June 1, 1954 - The town of Moriyama absorbed the village of Shidami to become the city of Moriyama, thus leaving the district. (5 towns, 2 villages)
- January 1, 1955 - The town of Komaki absorbed the villages of Ajioka and Shinooka to become the city of Komaki, thus leaving the district. (4 towns)
- January 1, 1958 - The towns of Sakashita (Bange) and Kōzōji were merged into the city of Kasugai. (2 towns)
- April 1, 1959 - The town of Shinano was merged into the city of Seto. (1 town)
- December 1, 1970 - The town of Asashi gained city status, thus renaming as the city of Owariasahi. Therefore, Higashikasugai District was dissolved as a result of this merger.

== See also ==
- List of dissolved districts of Japan
- Aichi Prefecture
