= Kasugai, Aichi =

Kasugai 春日井市
- Special city
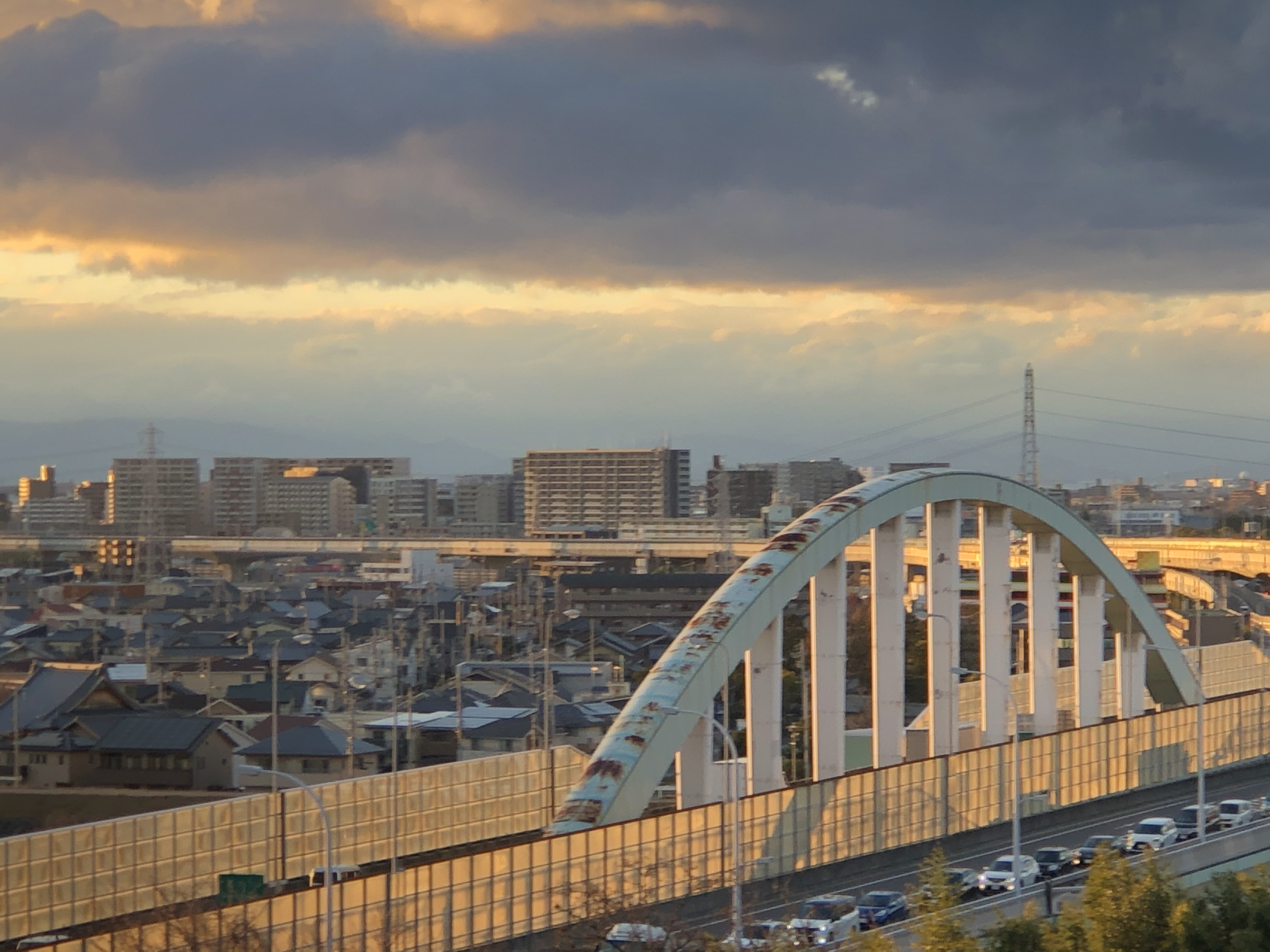
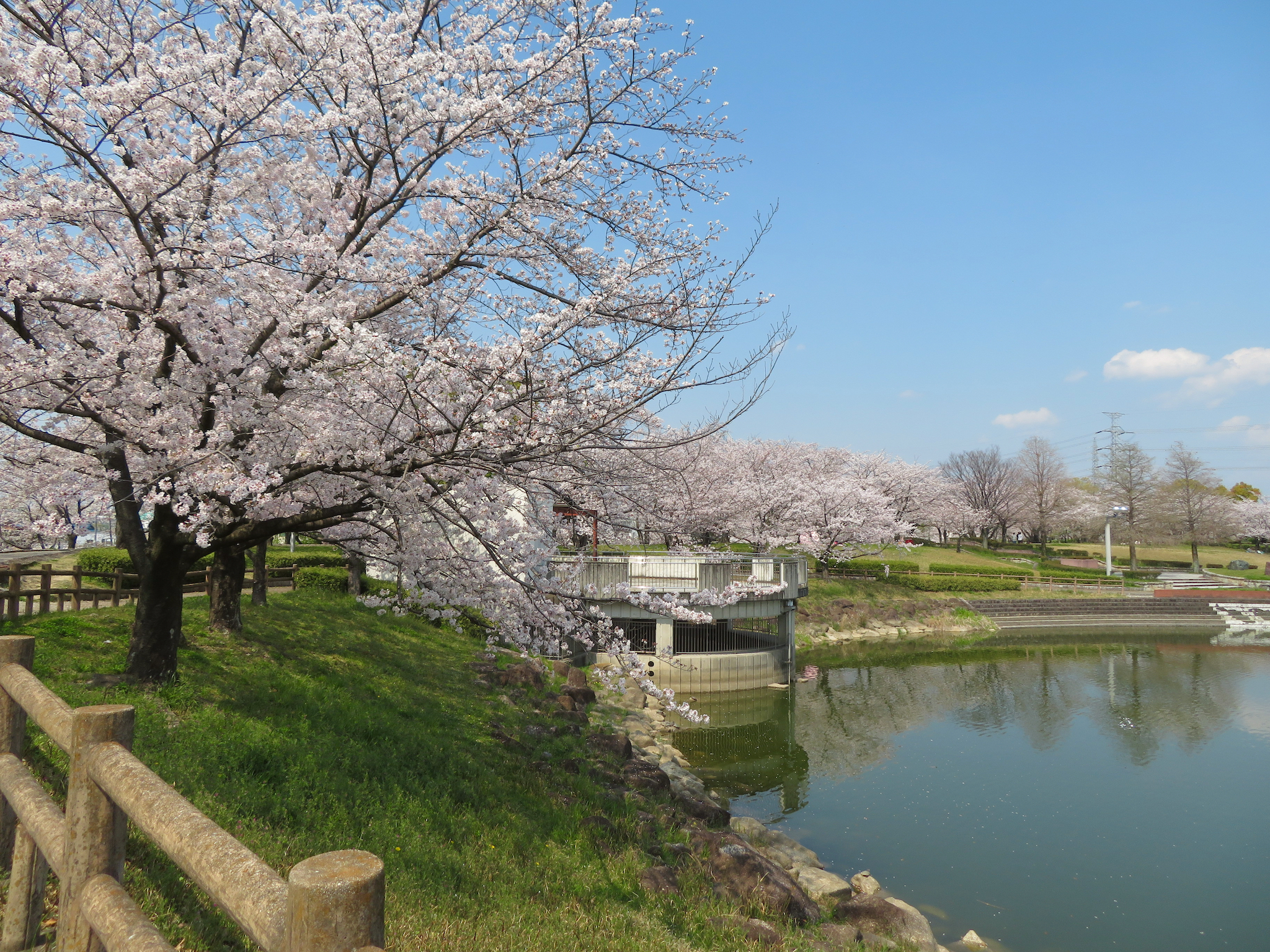
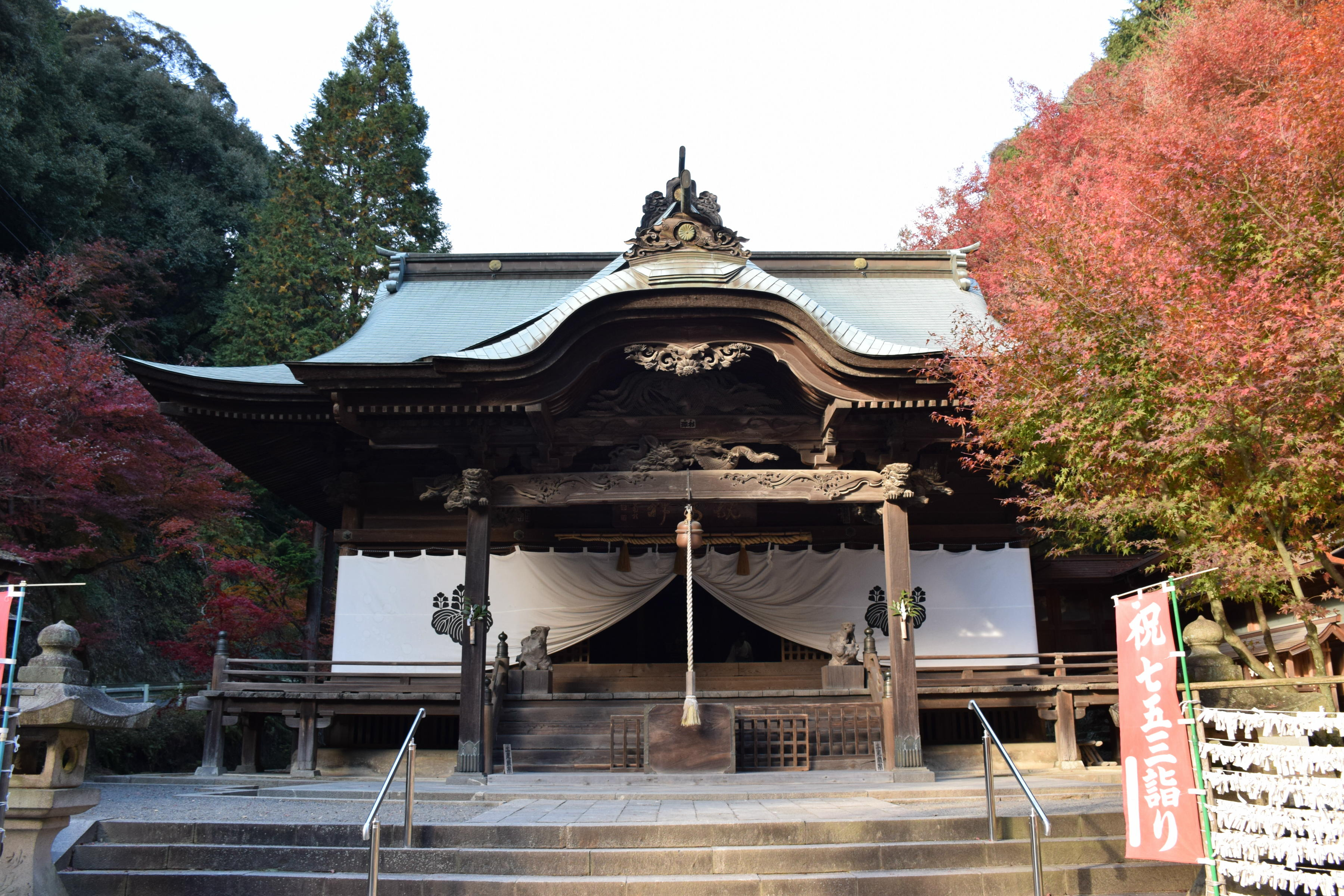
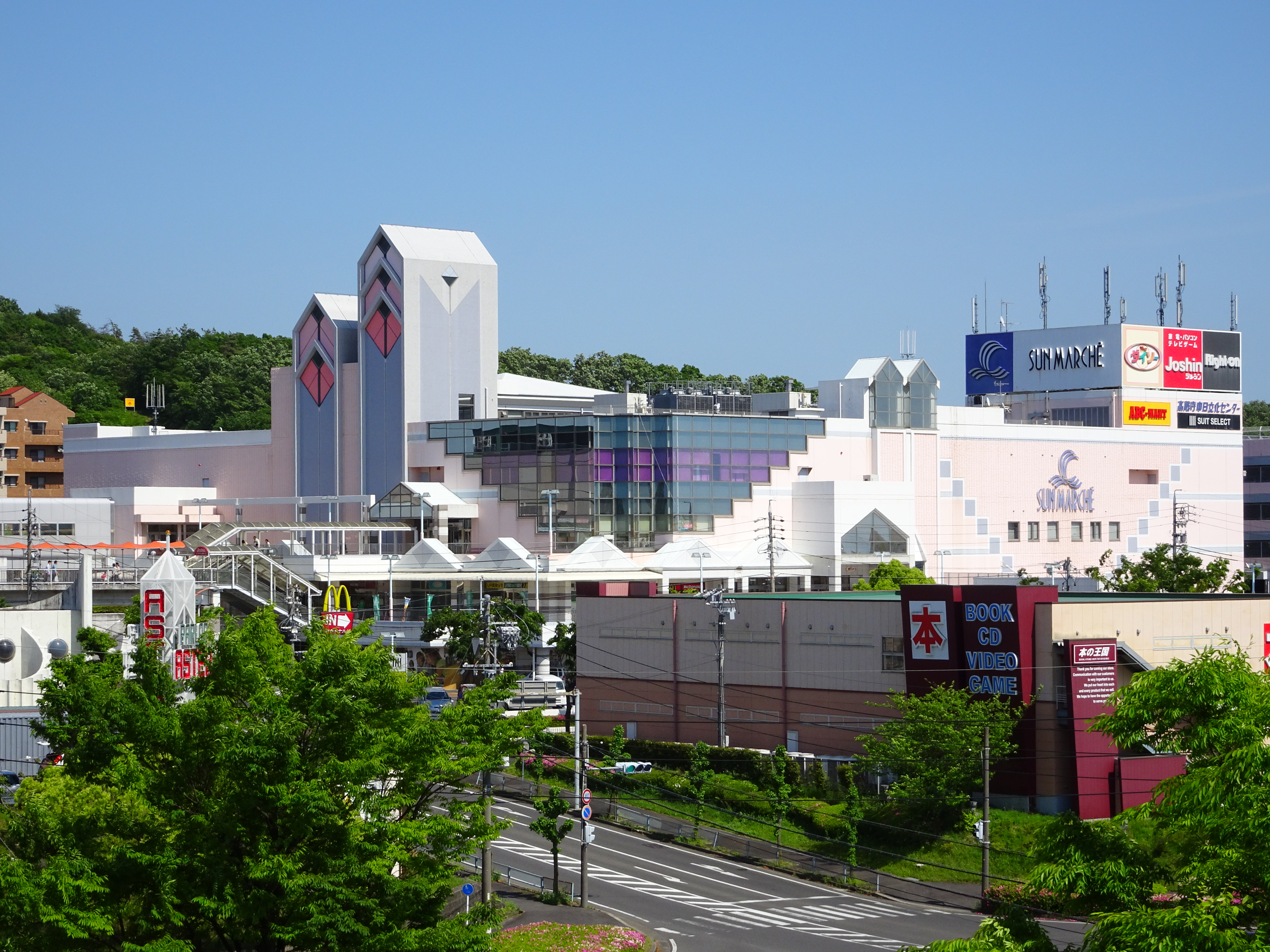
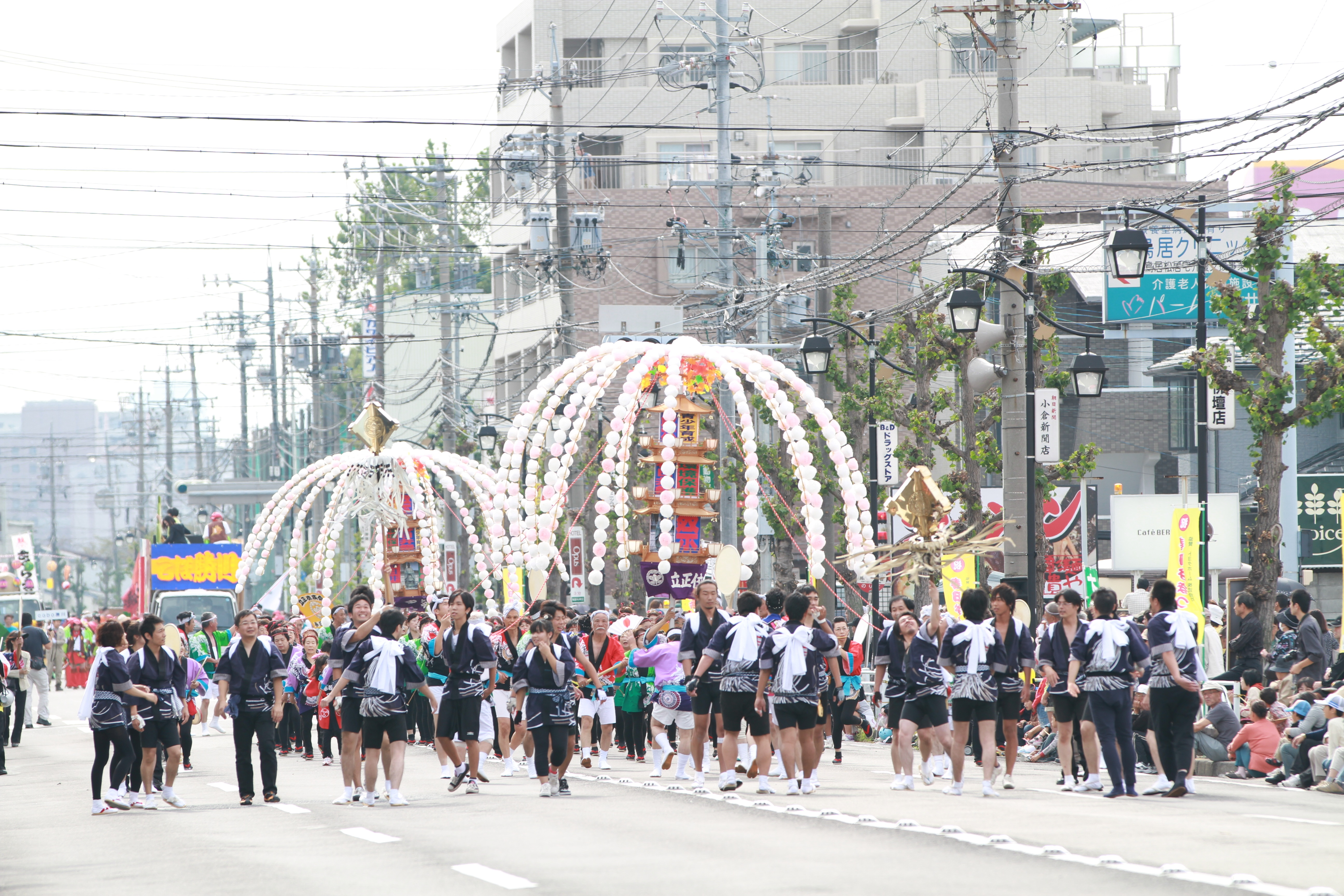
- Kachigawa Skyline Ochiai Park UtsutsuJinja Shrine Kōzōji New Town Kasugai Festival

- Flag Emblem
- Interactive map of Kasugai
- Location within Japan
- Coordinates: 35°14′51″N 136°58′20″E
- Country: Japan
- Region: Chūbu (Tōkai)
- Prefecture: Aichi

Government
  - – Mayor: Naoki Ishiguro (since May 2022)

Area
  - Total: 92.78 km^{2} (35.82 sq mi)

Population (October 1, 2019)
  - Total: 306,764
  - Density: 3,306/km^{2} (8,563/sq mi)
- Time zone: UTC+9 (Japan Standard Time)
  - Tree: Zelkova serrata
  - Flower: Sakura
- Phone number: 81-(0)568-81-5111
- Address: Toriimatsu 5–44, Kasugai City, Aichi Prefecture 486-8686
- Website: Official website

Kasugai (春日井市, Kasugai-shi) is a city in Aichi Prefecture, Japan. As of 1 October 2019, the city had an estimated population of 306,764, and a population density of 3,306 persons per km^{2}. The total area of the city is 92.78 square kilometres (35.82 sq mi). The city is sometimes called Owarikasugai to avoid confusion with other municipality of the same name, including Kasugai (now part of Fuefuki) in Yamanashi Prefecture.

== Geography ==
Kasugai is located in northwest Aichi Prefecture, north of the Nagoya metropolis, in the northern Nōbi Plain. The Shōnai River flows through the southern portion of the city.

=== Climate ===
The city has a climate characterized by hot and humid summers, and relatively mild winters (Köppen climate classification Cfa). The average annual temperature in Kasugai is 15.8 °C. The average annual rainfall is 1681 mm with September as the wettest month. The temperatures are highest on average in August, at around 28.2 °C, and lowest in January, at around 4.3 °C.

=== Demographics ===
Per Japanese census data, the population of Kasugai has increased rapidly over the past 70 years with the 1960s being the fastest growing decade.

Historical population
Year	Pop.	±%
1940	39,942	—
1950	64,346	+61.1%
1960	77,174	+19.9%
1970	161,835	+109.7%
1980	244,119	+50.8%
1990	266,599	+9.2%
2000	287,623	+7.9%
2010	305,662	+6.3%

=== Surrounding municipalities ===
Aichi Prefecture

- Inuyama
- Komaki
- Nagoya (Kita-ku, Moriyama-ku)
- Seto
- Toyoyama

Gifu Prefecture

- Tajimi

== History ==
The area which is now Kasugai contains many Kofun period burial mounds. During the Edo period, the area was mostly part of the holdings of Owari Domain.

With the Meiji period establishment of the modern municipalities system, the area was organized into villages under Higashikasugai District, including the village of Kachigawa on October 1, 1889. Kachigawa was raised to town status on July 25, 1900. On June 1, 1943, Kachigawa was merged with neighboring villages of Toriimatsu and Shinogi to form the city of Kasugai, and in 1958, Kasugai annexed the neighboring towns of Sakashita and Kōzōji.

Kasugai gained special city status on April 1, 2001, with increased local autonomy.

== Government ==
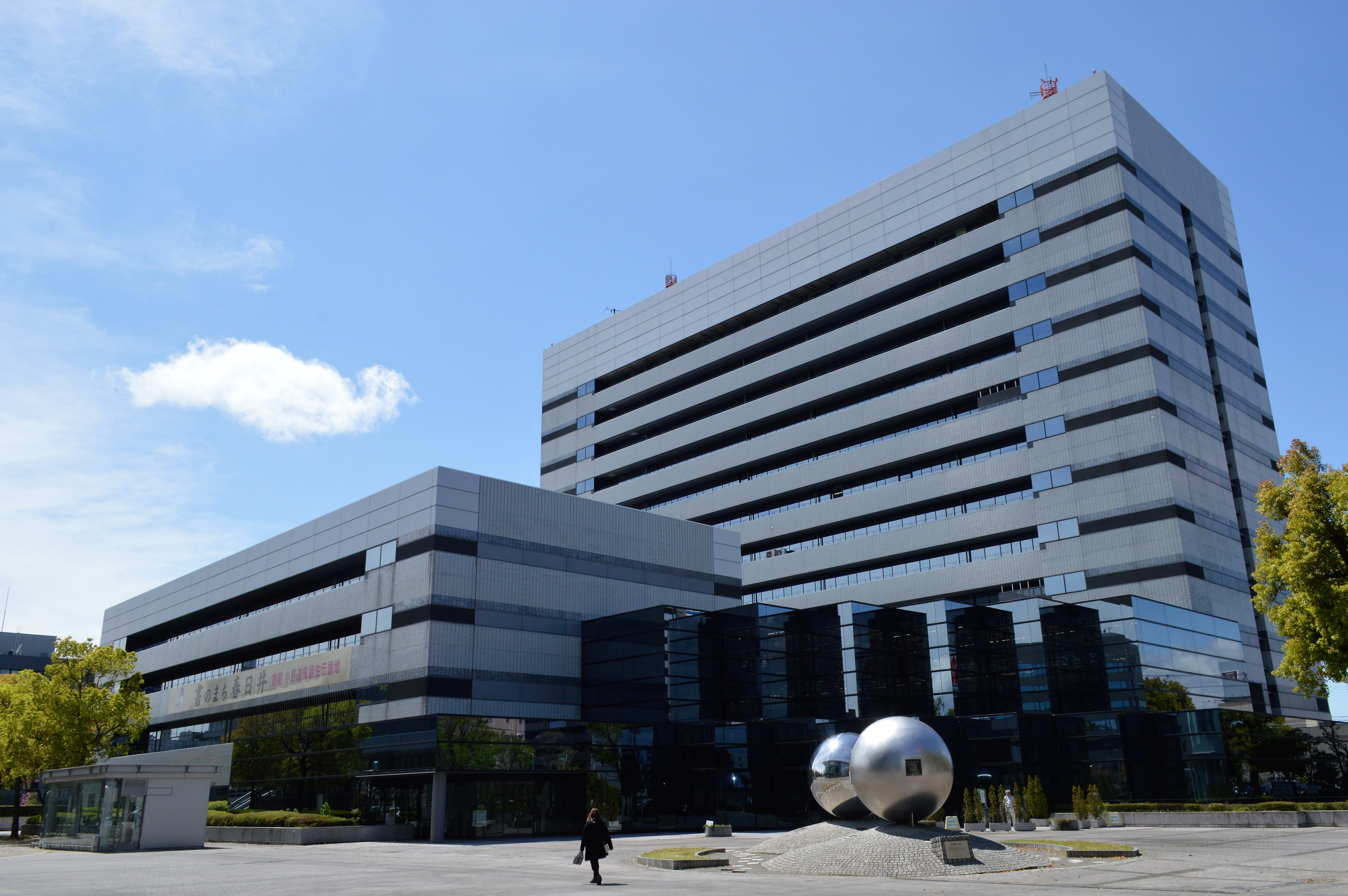
City Hall

=== Mayor-council ===
Kasugai has a mayor-council form of government with a directly elected mayor and a unicameral city legislature of 32 members.

=== Prefectural Assembly ===
The city contributes four members to the Aichi Prefectural Assembly.

=== House of Representatives ===
In terms of national politics, the city is part of Aichi 6th district of the lower house of the Diet of Japan.

== Sister cities ==
=== International ===
Sister cities

City	Country	State	Since
Kelowna	Canada	British Columbia	February 5, 1981

=== National ===
Disaster alliance city

City	Prefecture	Region	Since
Ōgaki	Gifu Prefecture	Chūbu region	August 25, 2011
Kasuga	Fukuoka Prefecture	Kyūshū region	August 7, 2012
Aomori	Aomori Prefecture	Tōhoku region	October 10, 2012

== Economy ==
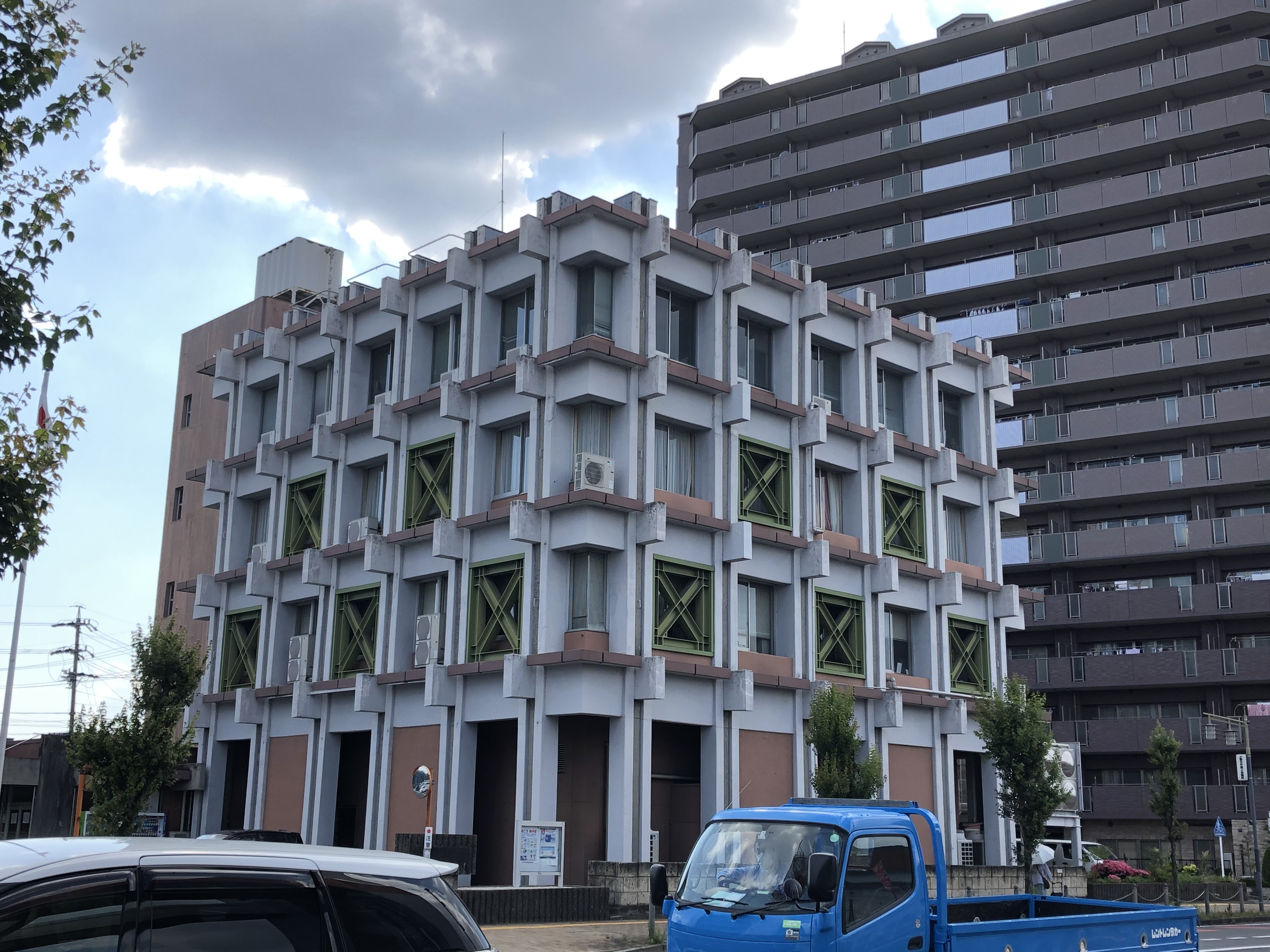
Kasugai Chamber of Commerce and Industry

Due to its location, Kasugai is increasingly becoming a bedroom community for the greater Nagoya metropolis.

In terms of agricultural production, Kasugai is noted for horticulture and produces over 80% of the cactus sold as houseplants. Oji Paper Company, Panasonic and Fujitsu have large factories in Kasugai. There are also several shopping centers in Kasugai, including APiTA Kōzōji (SUN MARCHÉ), Æon Kasugai shopping center, Shimizuya, and The Mall Kasugai.

Companies headquartered in Kasugai include Aichi Electric, Amiyaki Tei, Daito ME, Chita Kogyo, Toyo Electric Corporation, KDK (Panasonic Ecology Systems), Panasonic Industrial Devices SUNX, Fine Sinter, and Mitsuchi Corporation.

== Education ==
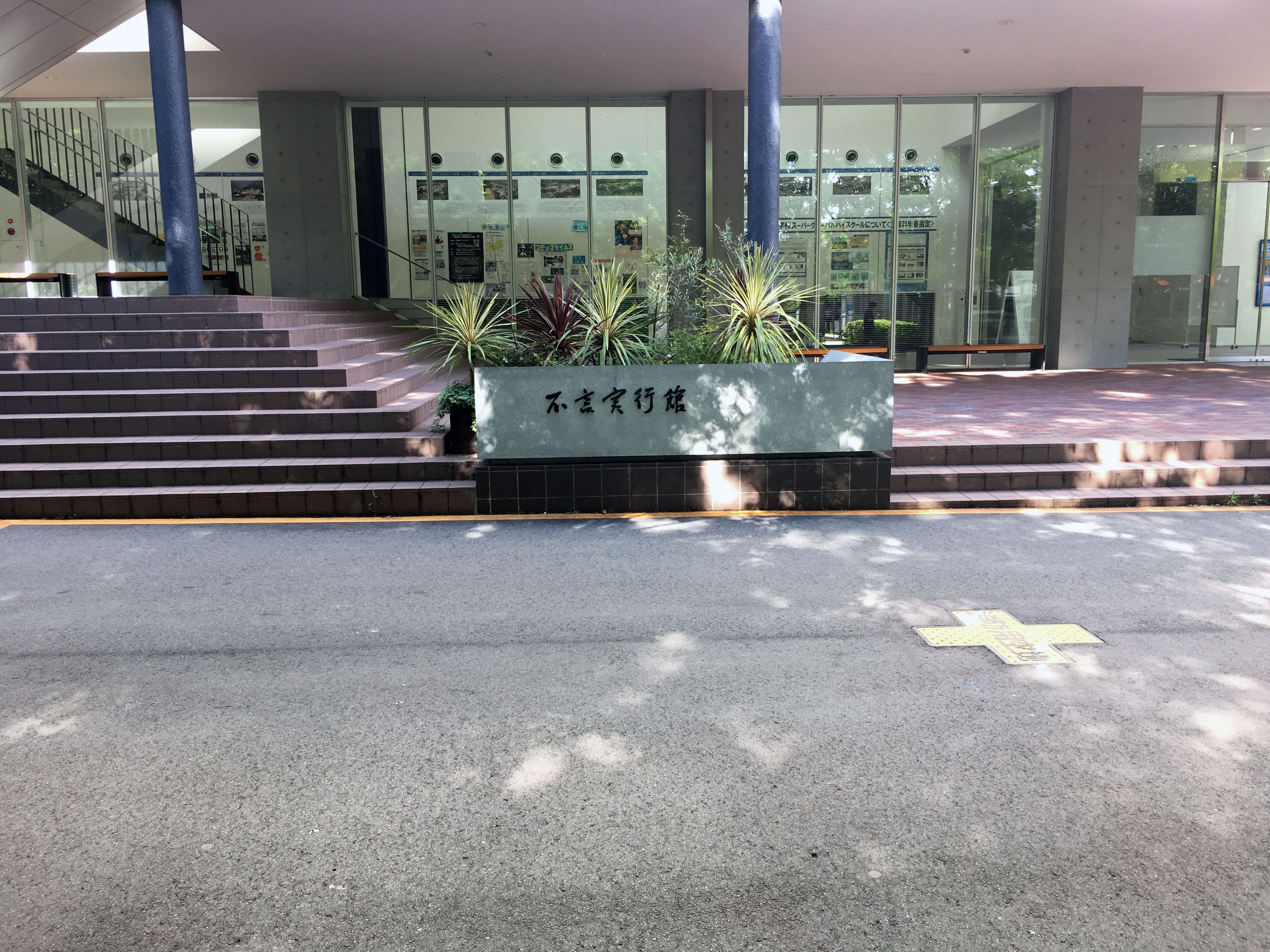
Chubu University

=== University ===
Colleges and universities:

- Chubu University
- Meijo University, Kasugai campus

=== Primary and secondary education ===
- Kasugai has 37 public elementary schools and 15 public junior high schools operated by the city government, and seven public high schools operated by the Aichi Prefectural Board of Education. Chubu University owns one private junior high school and one private high school on its campus. The prefecture also operates two special education schools for the handicapped.

=== International schools ===
- Toshun Korean Primary School (東春朝鮮初級学校) – North Korean school

== Transportation ==
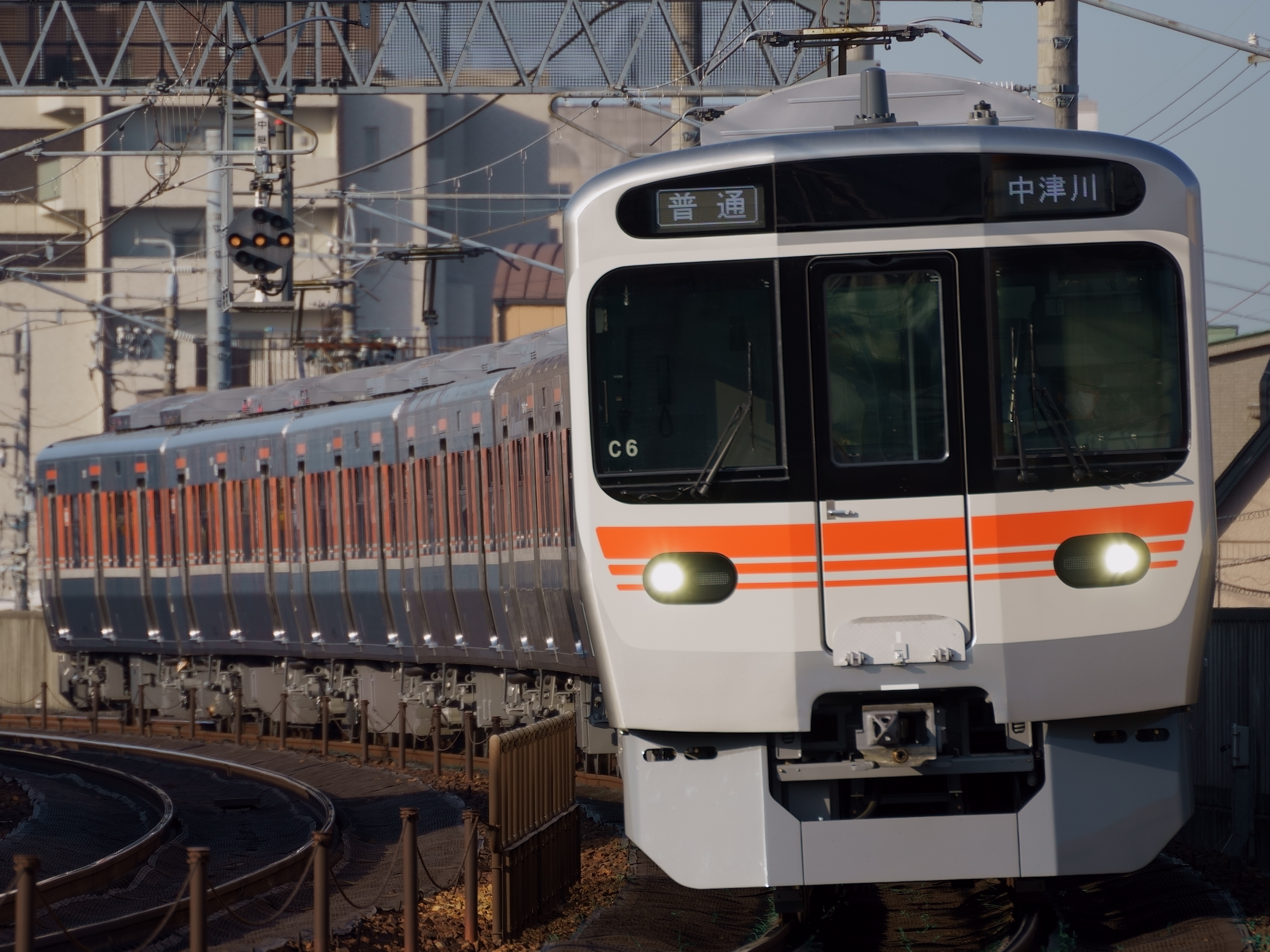
Chūō Main Line

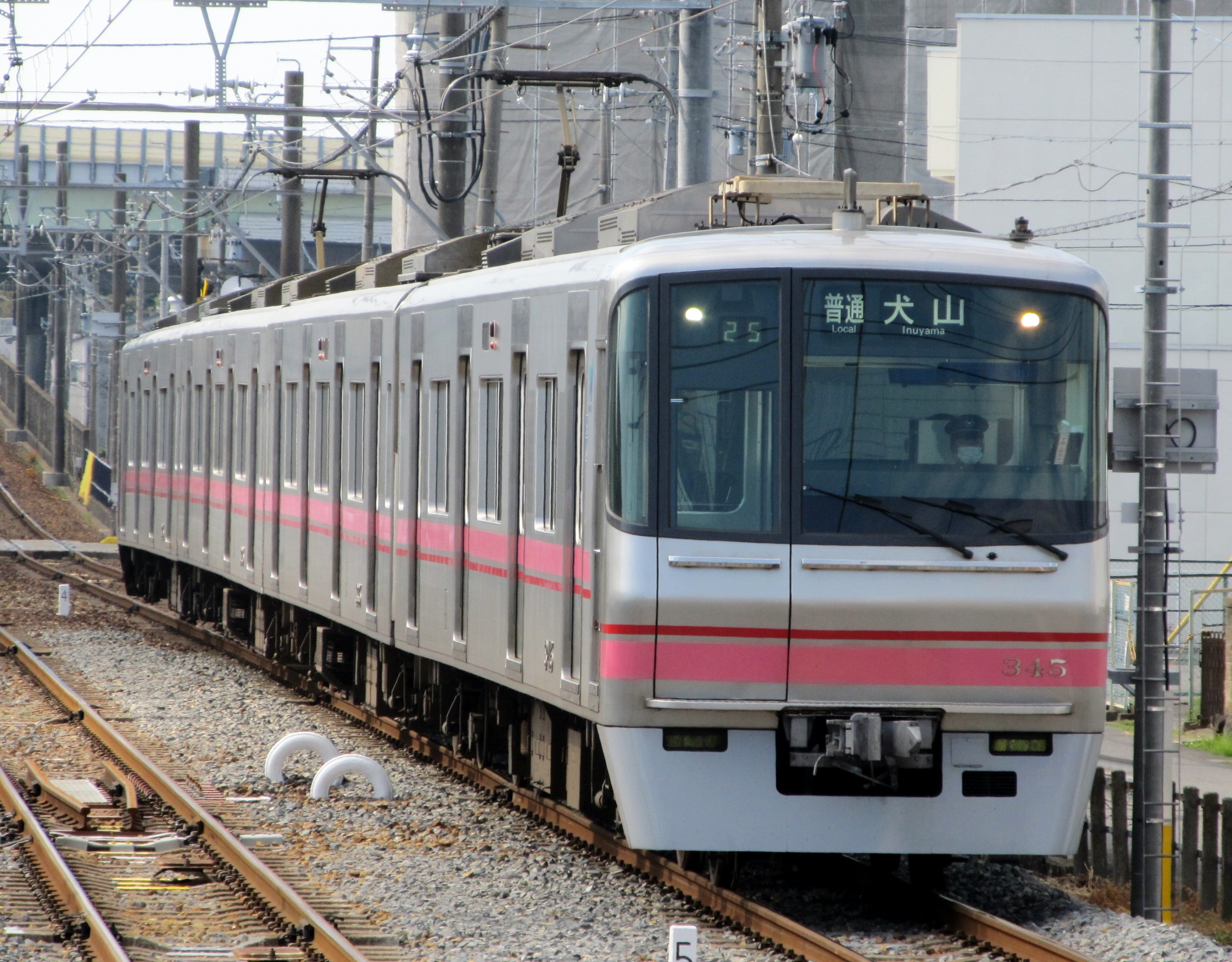
Meitetsu Komaki Line

=== Airways ===
==== Airports ====
- Nagoya Airfield

=== Railways ===
==== Conventional lines ====
Central Japan Railway Company

- Chūō Main Line: Jōkōji – Kōzōji – Jinryō – Kasugai – Kachigawa –

Meitetsu

- Komaki Line: - Ajiyoshi – Kasugai – Ushiyama – Manai –

JR-Central Transport Service Company

- Jōhoku Line: Kachigawa – Ajiyoshi –

Aichi Loop Railway

- Aichi Loop Line: Kōzōji –

=== Expressway ===
==== Highways ====
- Tōmei Expressway
- Chūō Expressway
- Nagoya Dai-Ni Kanjo Expressway (Meinikan)

==== Japan National Route ====
- National Route 19
- National Route 155
- National Route 302

== Local attractions ==
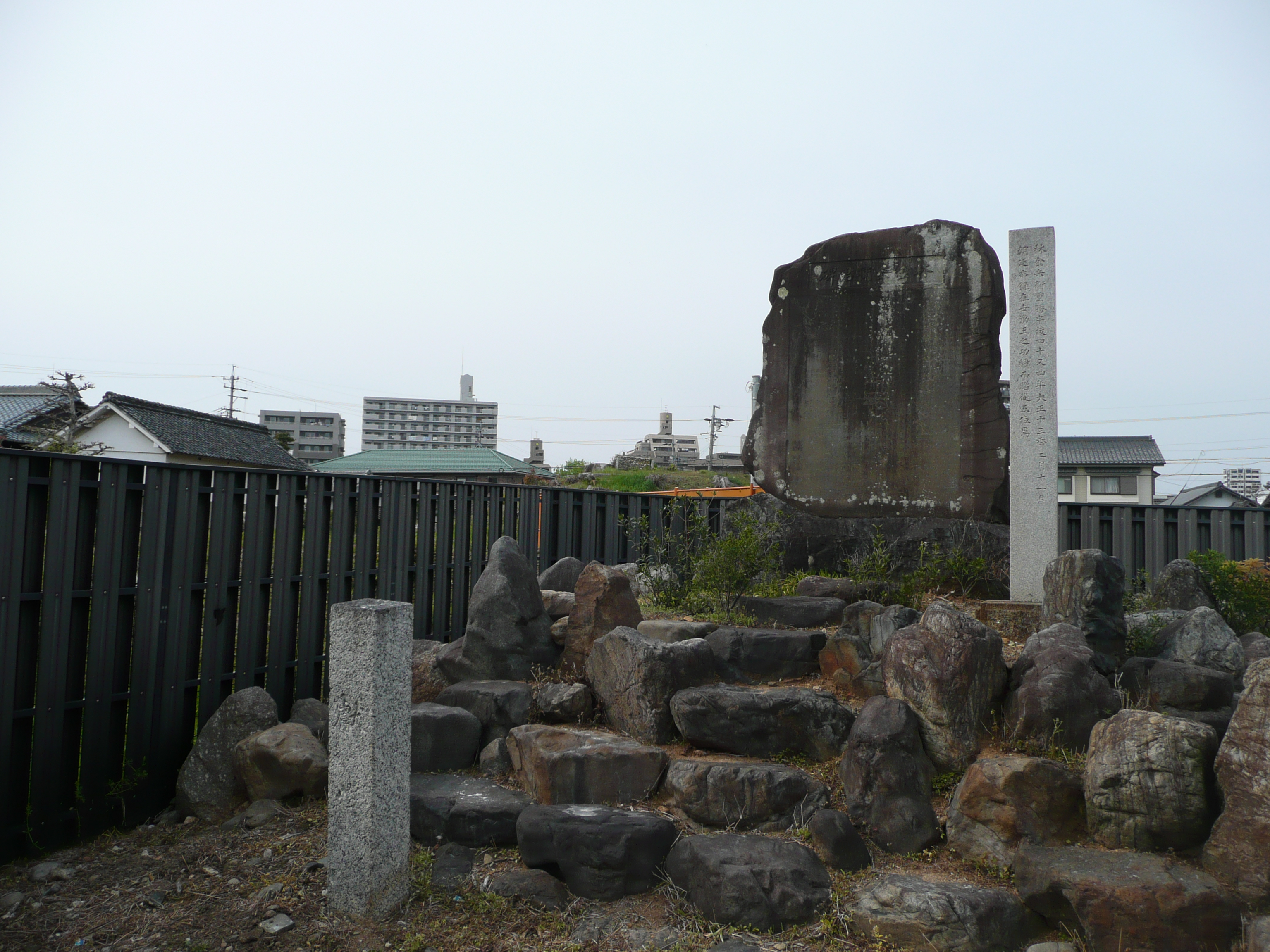
Jōjō Castle

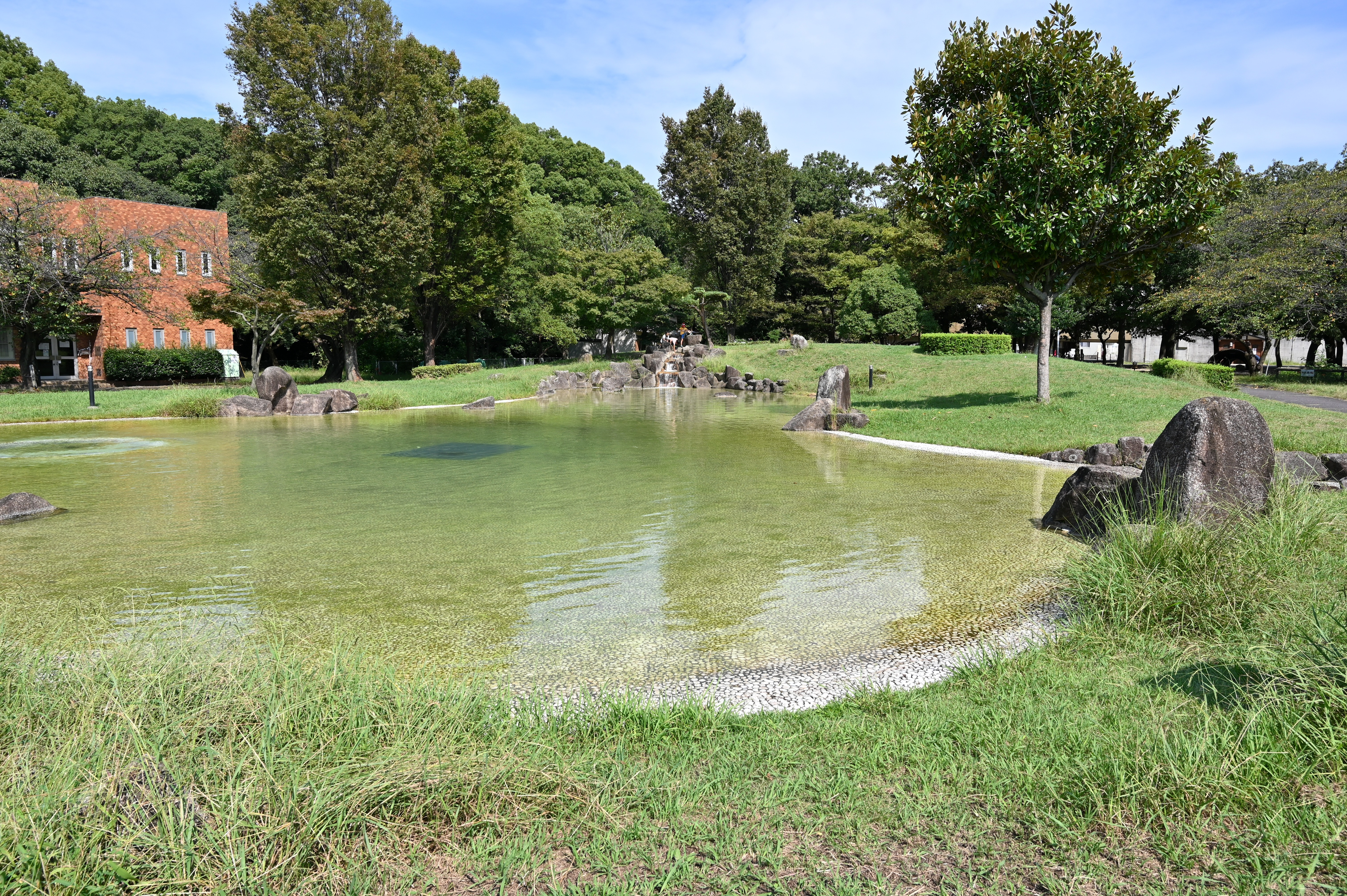
Ajiyoshi Futagoyama Kofun

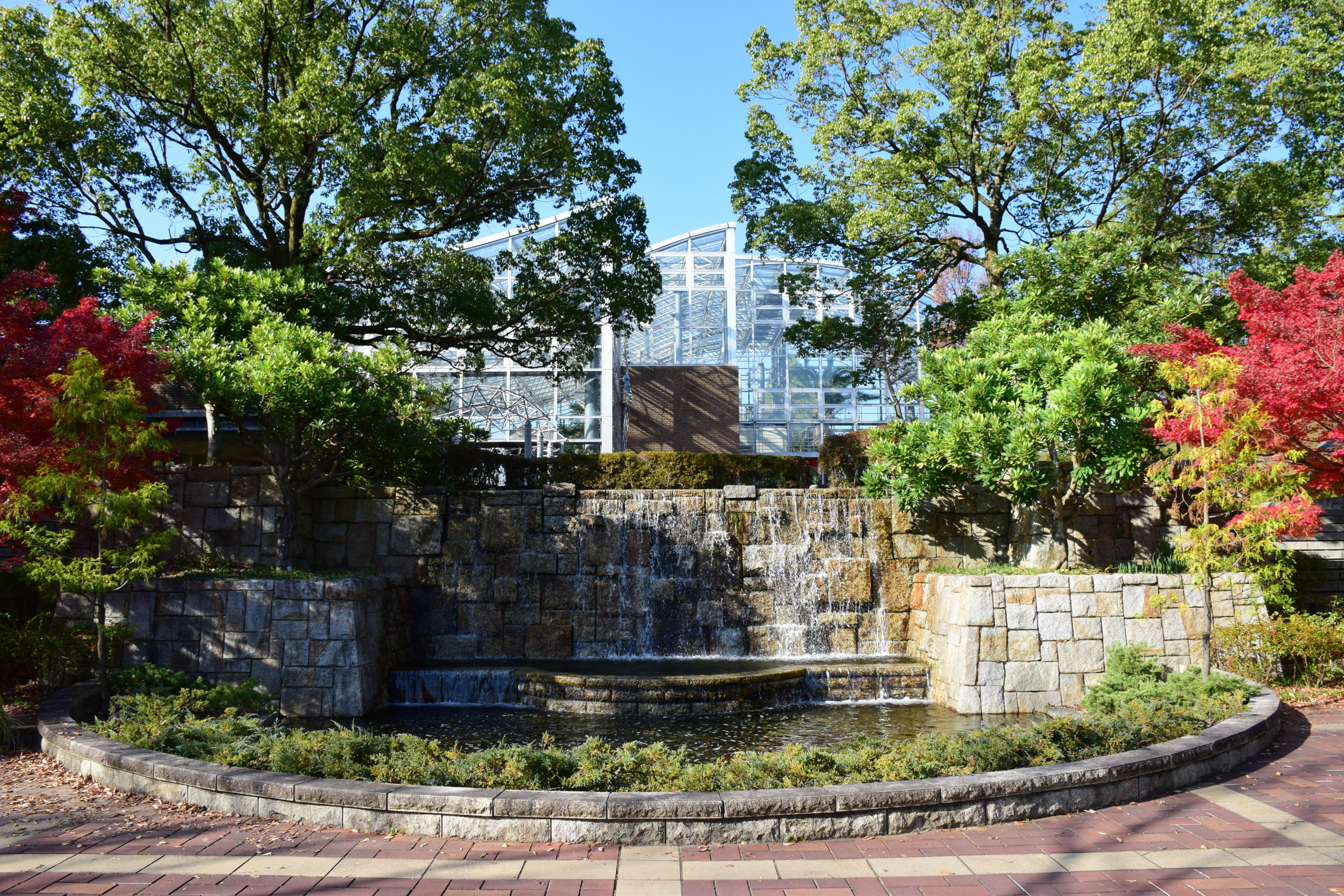
Greenpia Kasugai

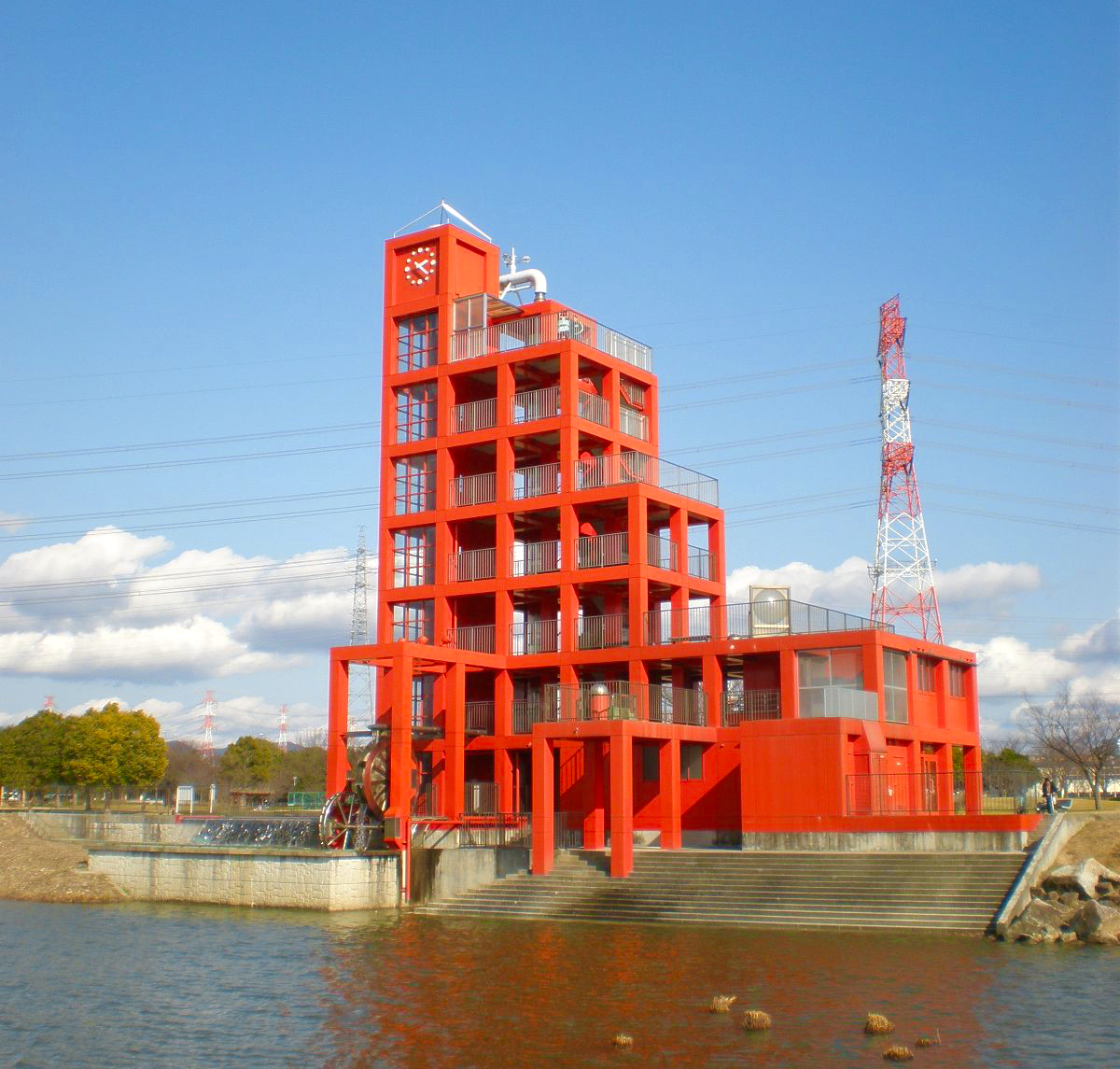
Ochiai Park

Castle

- Jōjō Castle ruins
- Ōdome Castle
- Yoshida Castle

Buddhist temple

- Enpuku-ji temple
- Kōzō-ji temple
- Mitsuzō-in temple
- Rinsyō-in temple
- Shintoku-ji temple
- Taigaku-ji temple
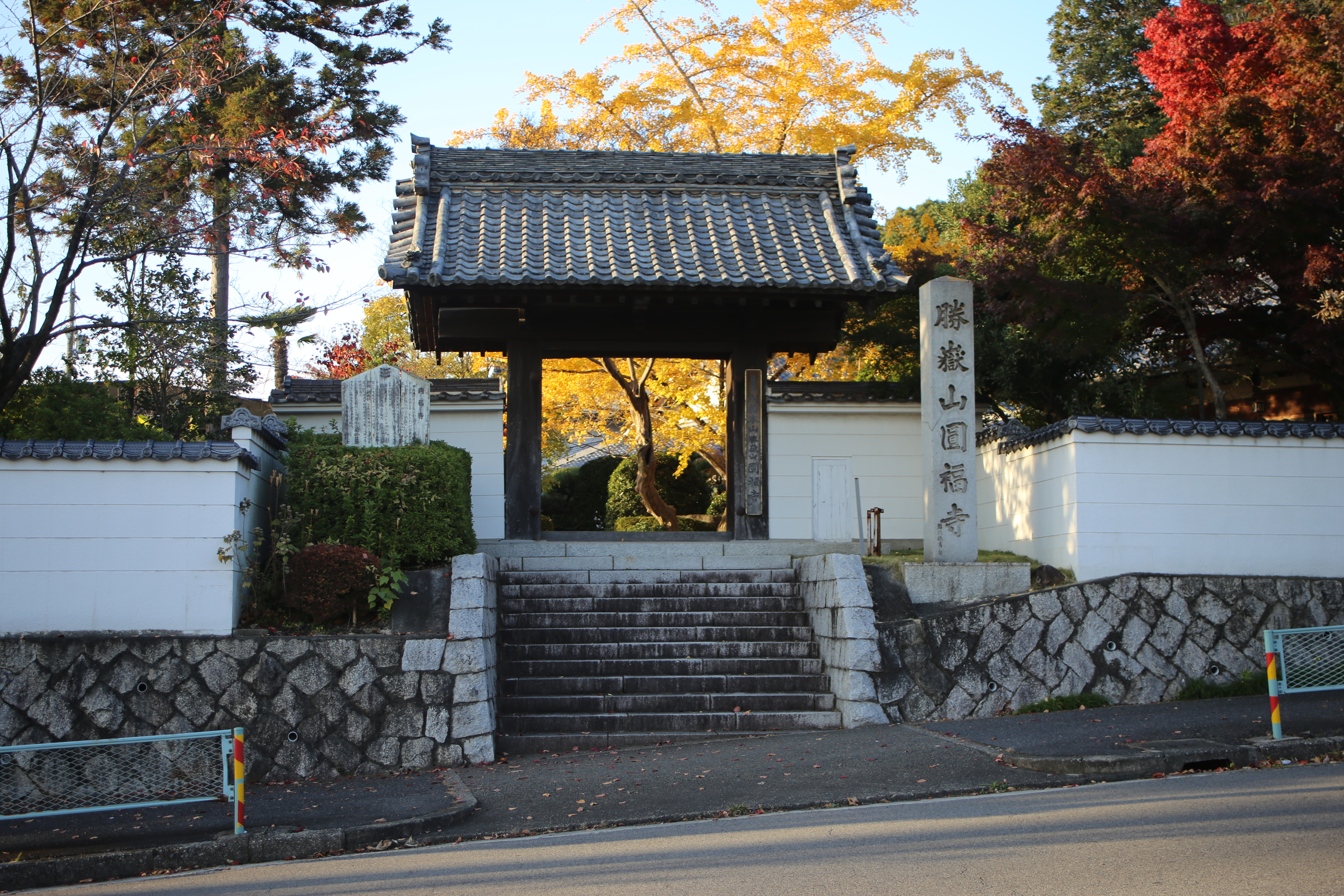
Enpukuji temple

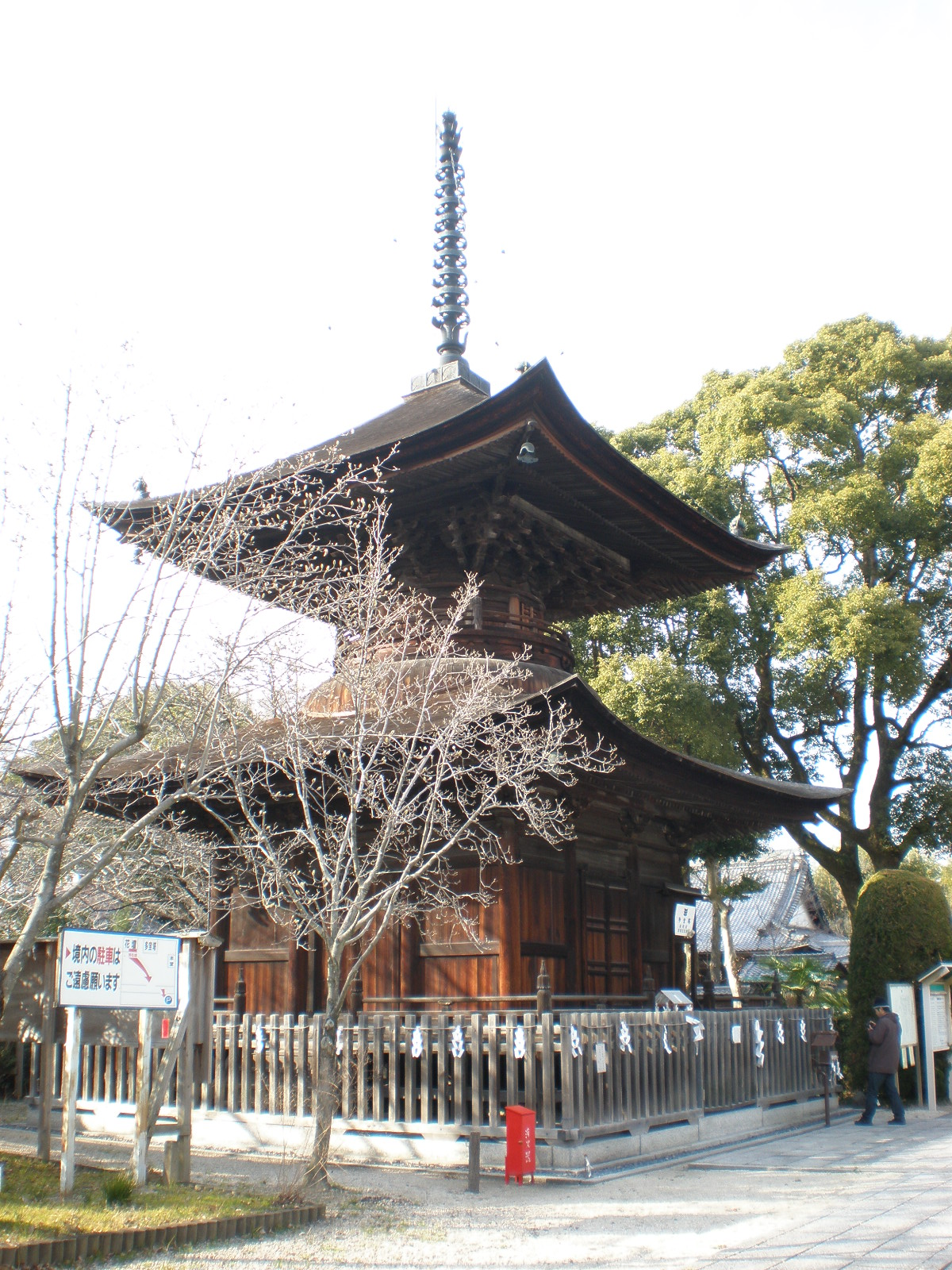
Mitsuzōin temple

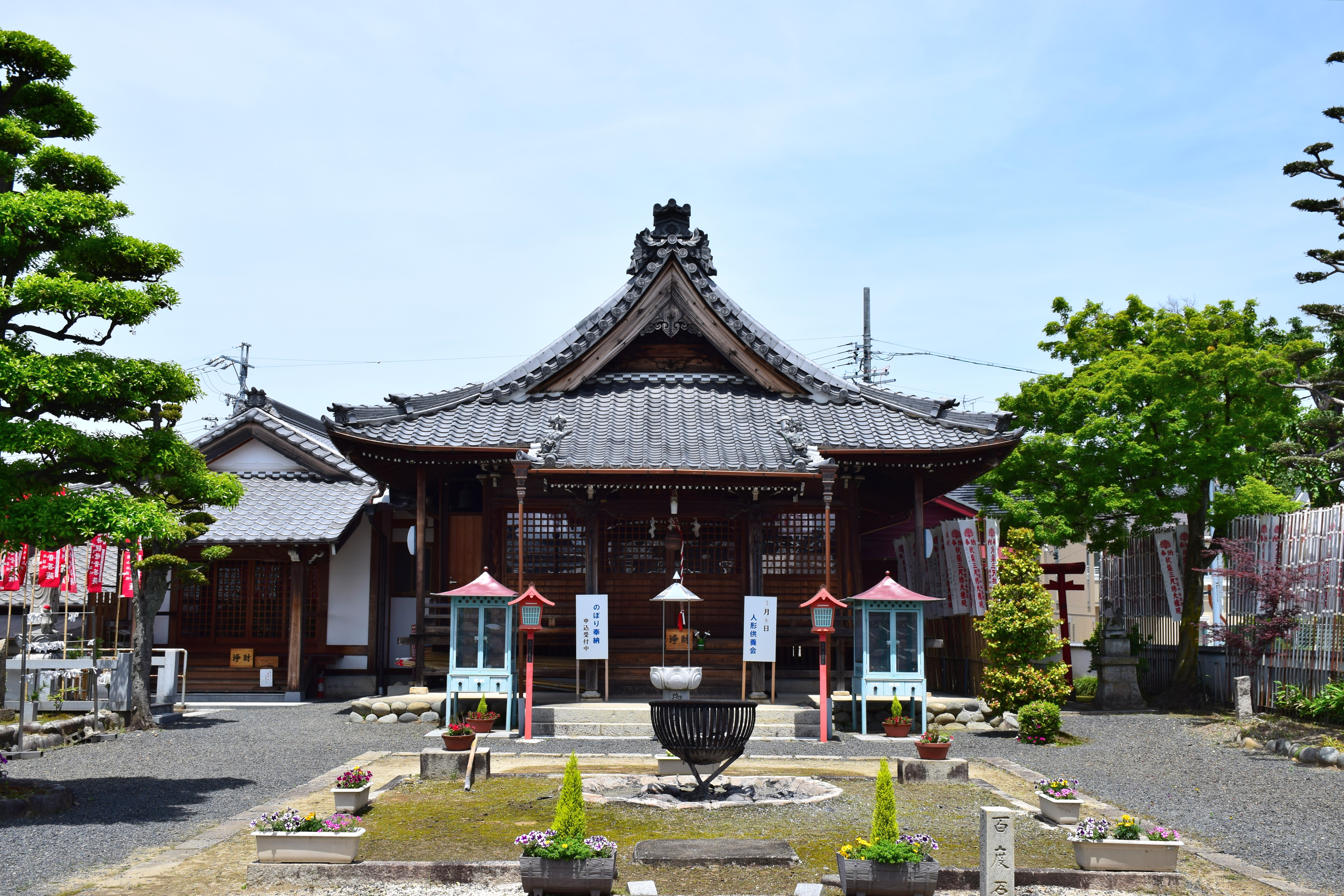
Rinsyōin temple

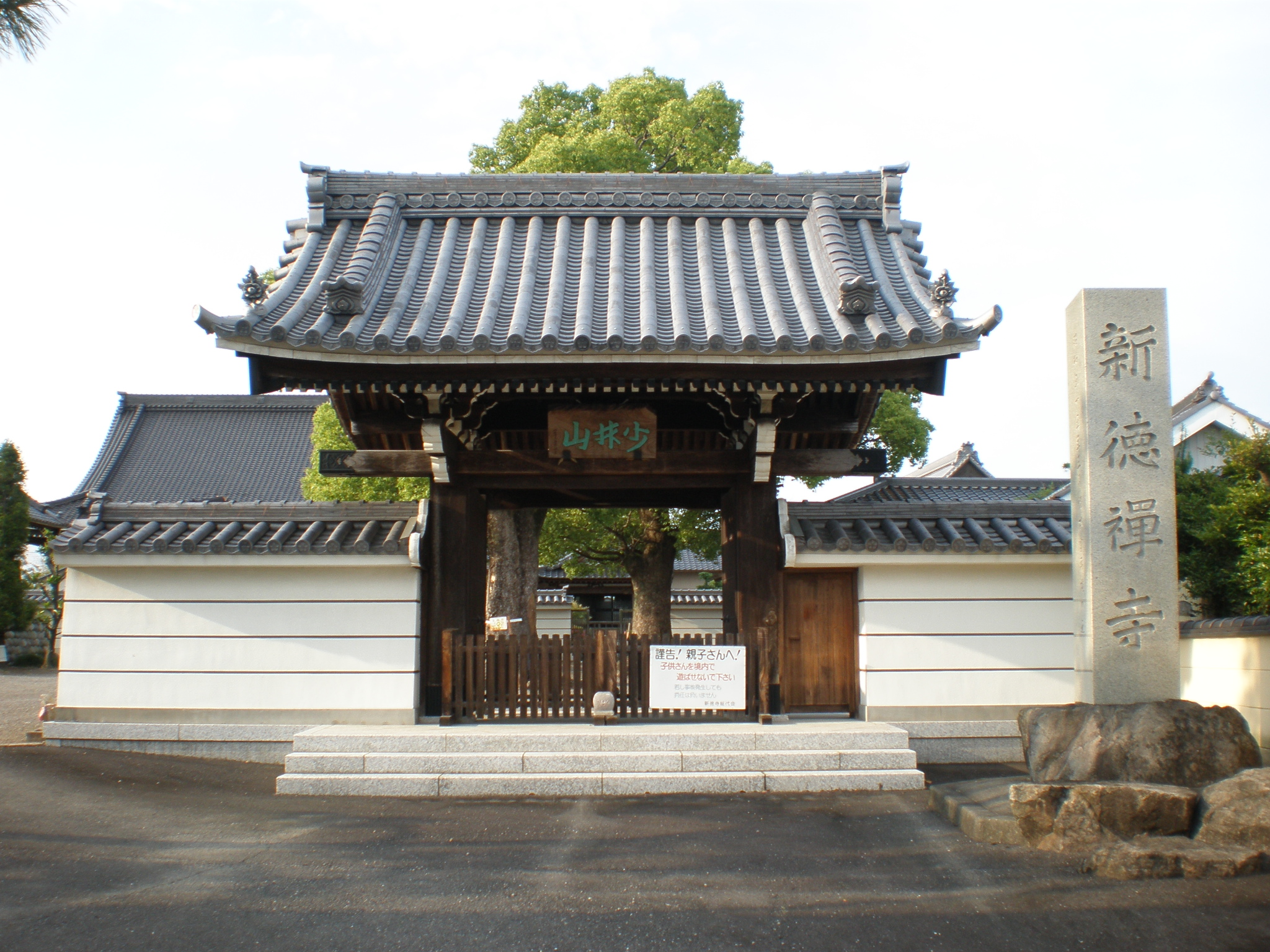
Shintokuji temple

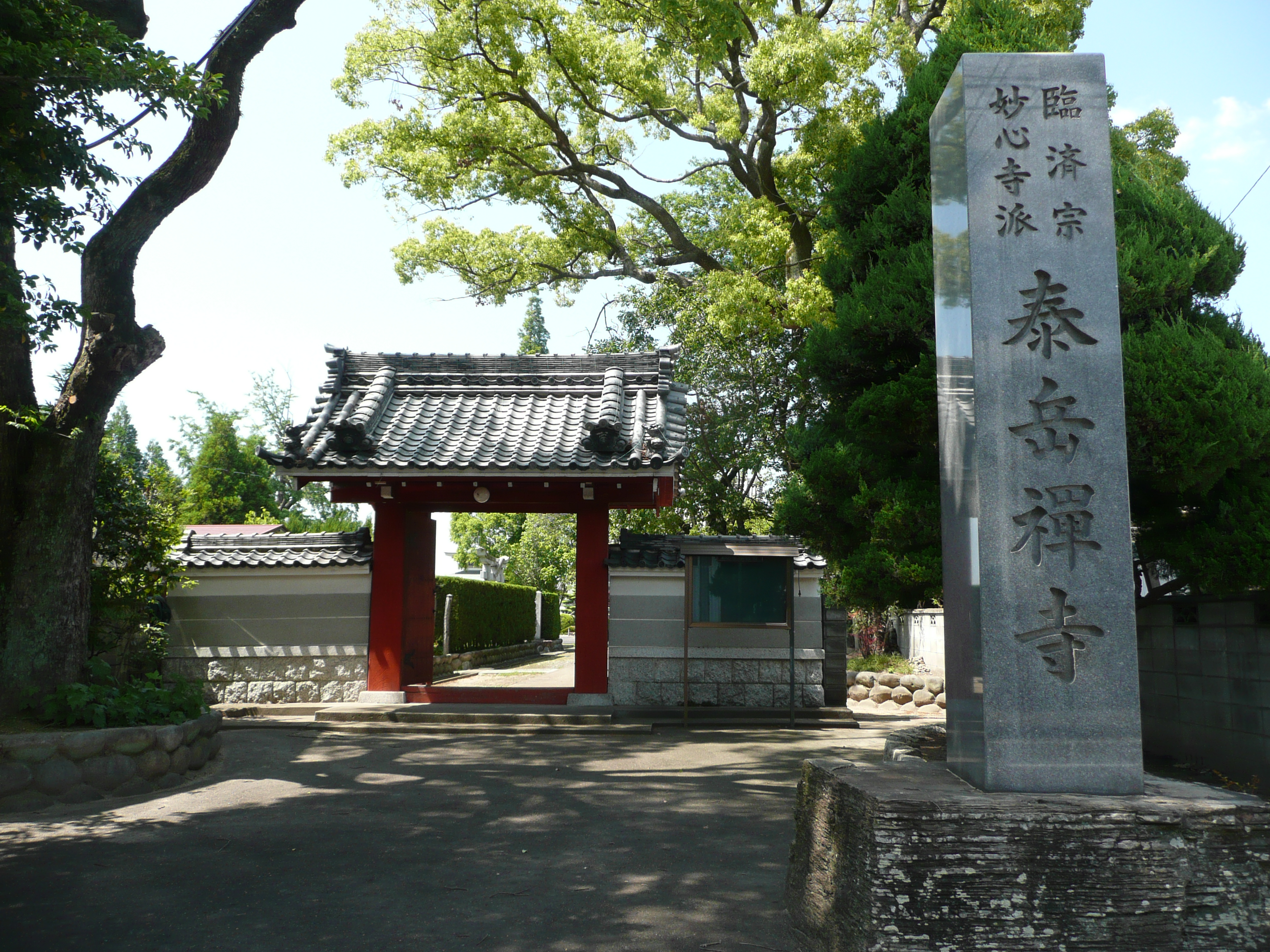
Taigakuji temple

Shinto shrines

- Itahato Jinja
- Hakusan Jinja
- Matsubara Jinja
- Sakashita Jinja
- Utsutsu Jinja
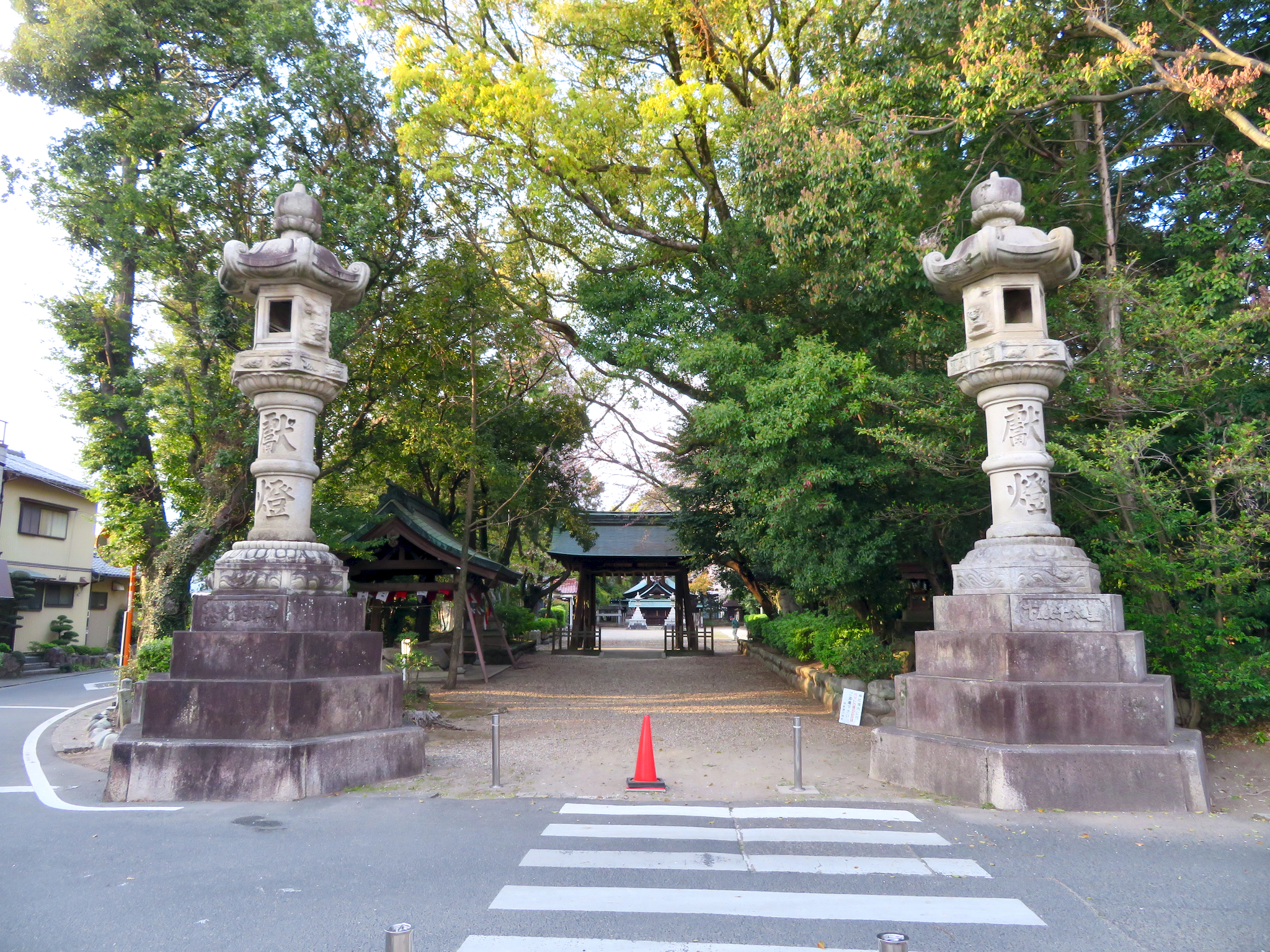
Itahato Jinja

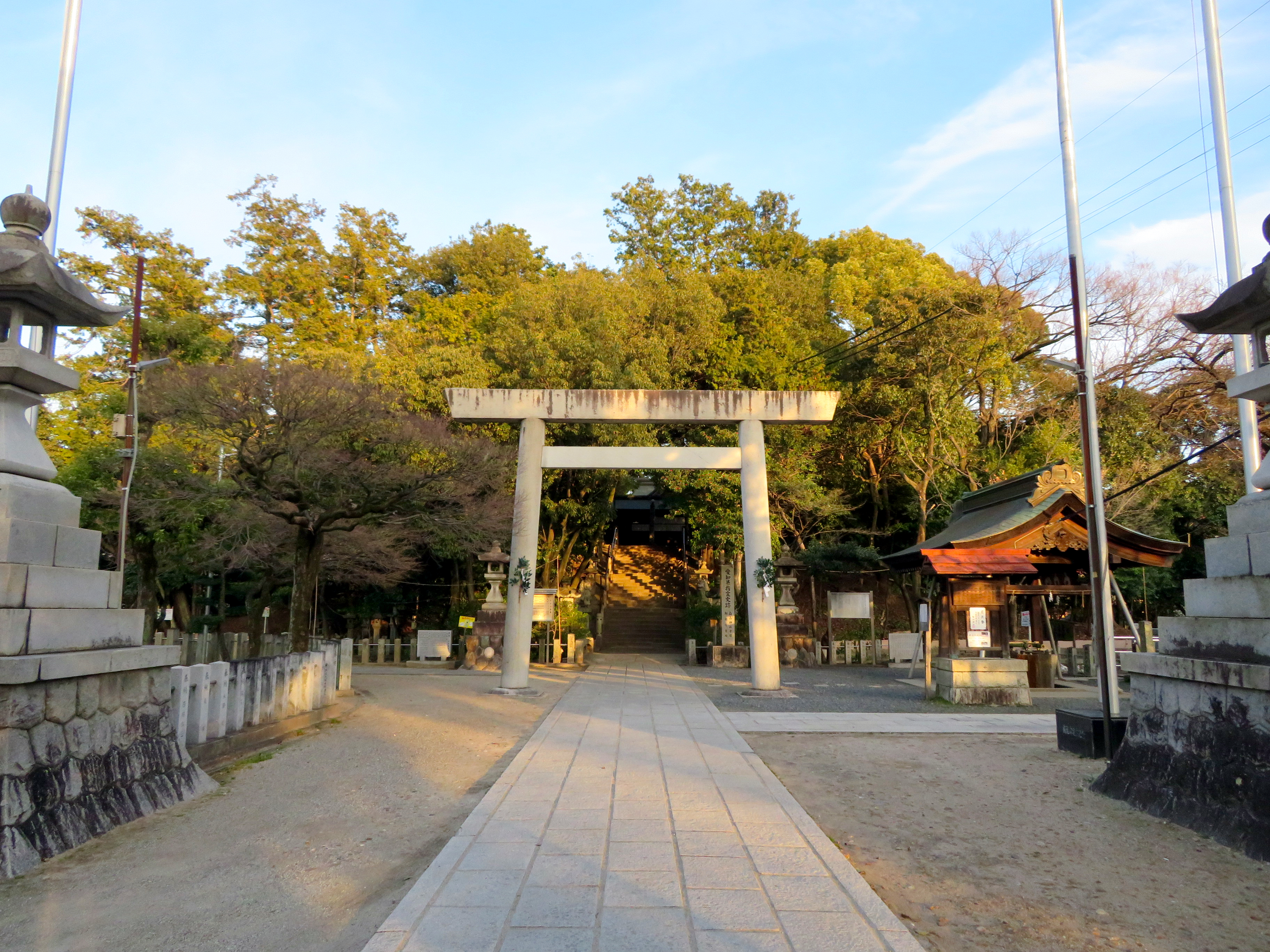
Hakusan Jinja

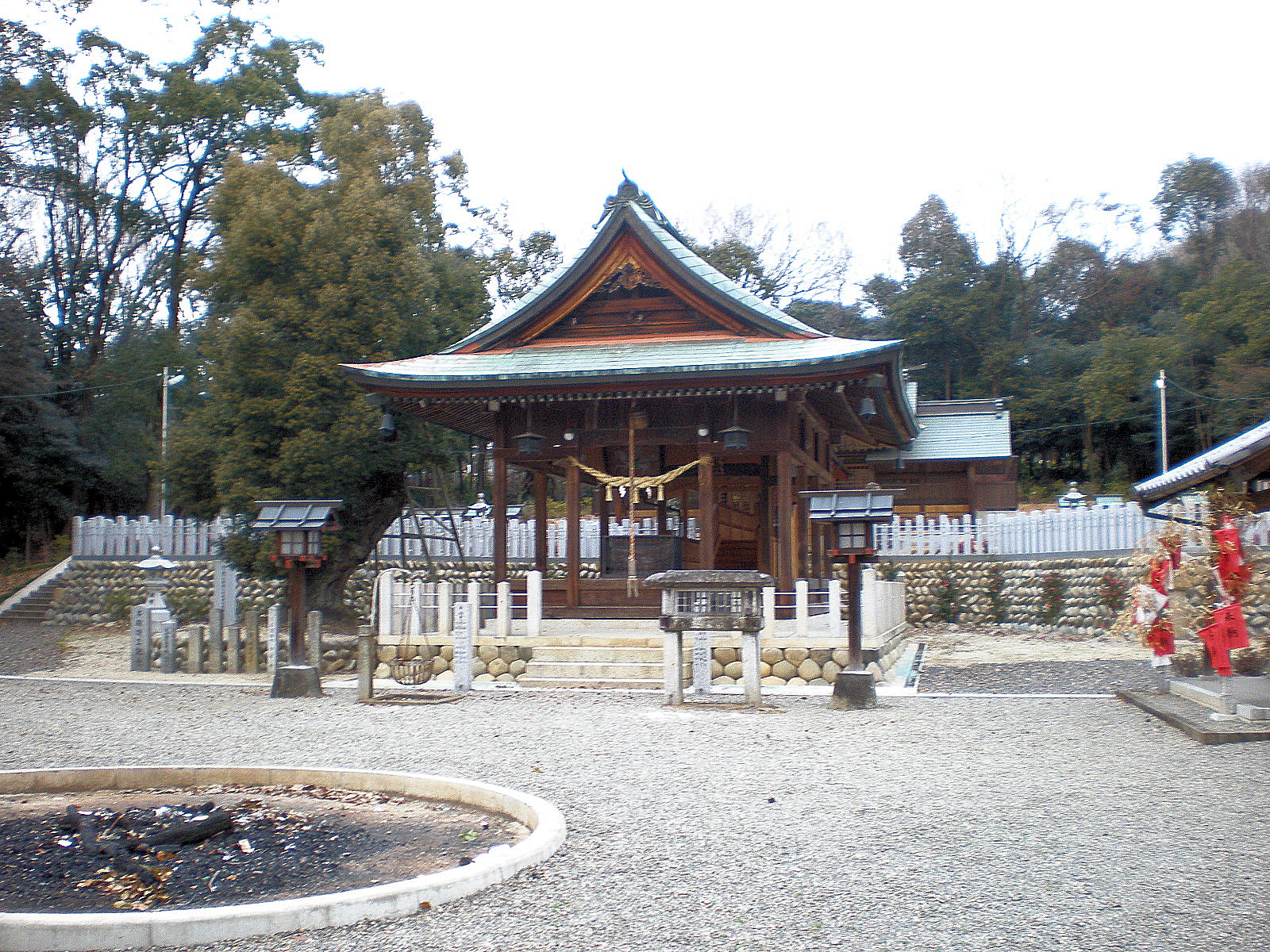
Matsubara Jinja

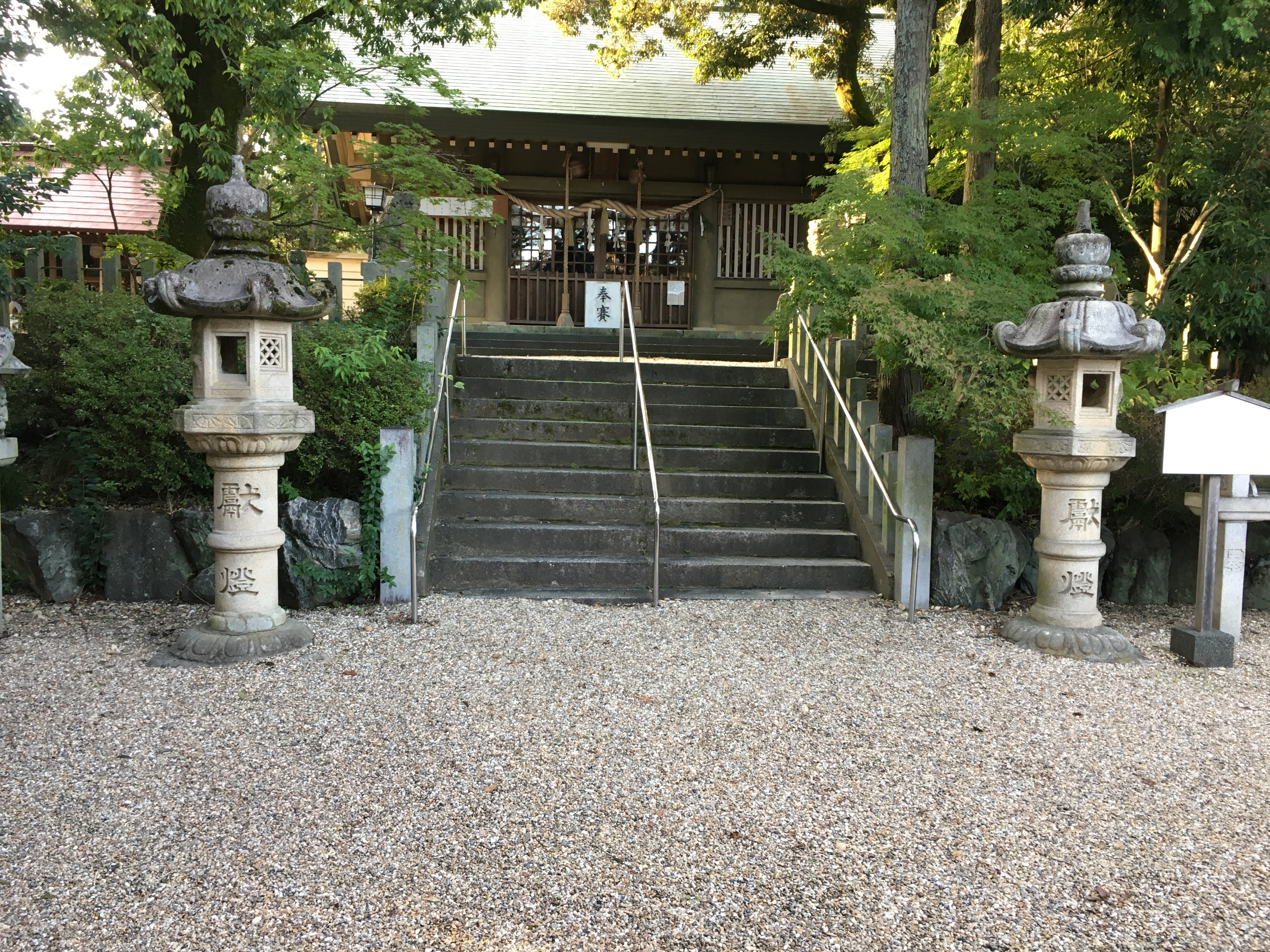
Sakashita Jinja

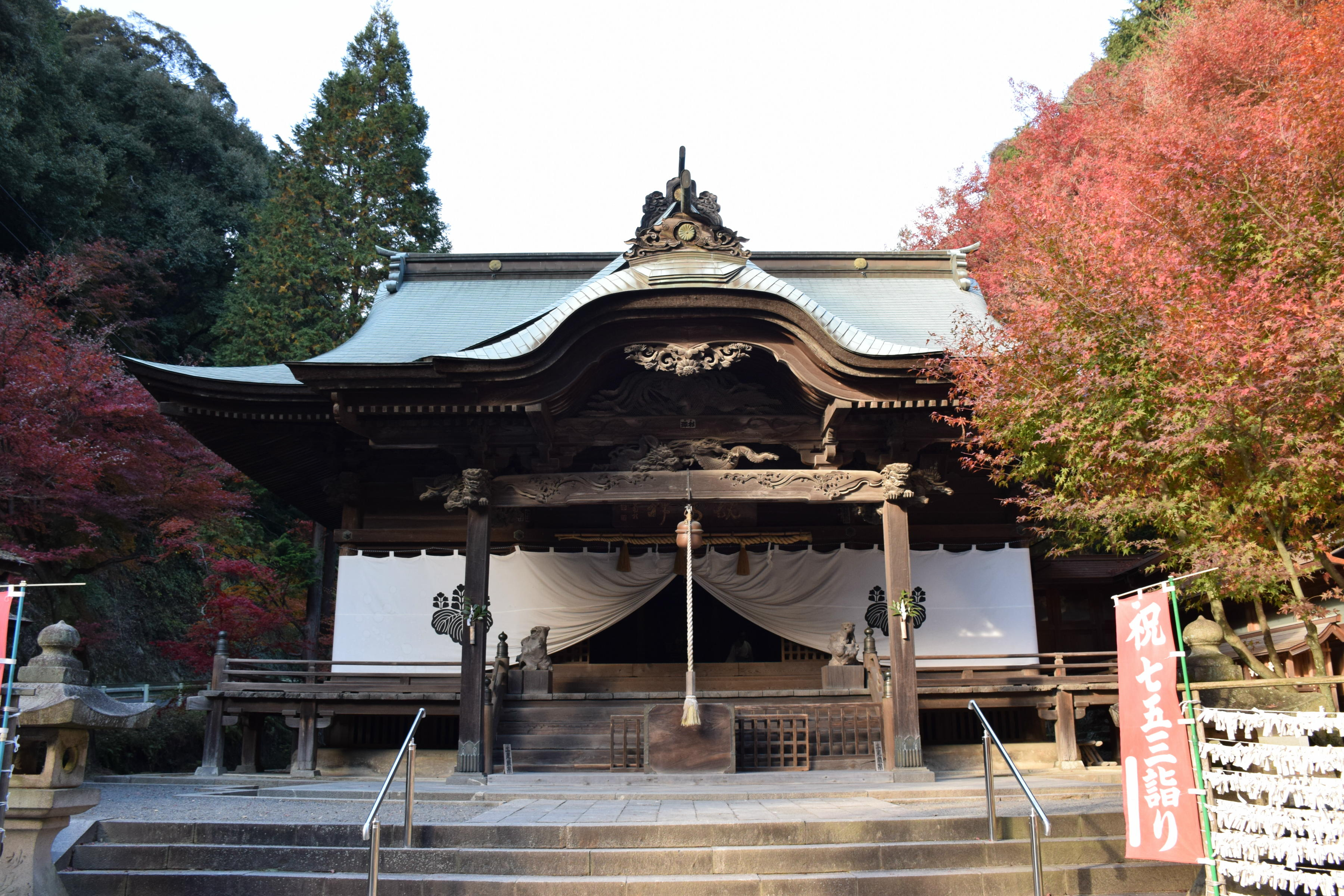
Utsutsu Jinja

Archaeological sites

- Ajiyoshi Futagoyama Kofun

Library

- Kasugai city library

Park

- Greenpia Kasugai
- Ochiai Park

== Notable residents ==
- Kousei Amano, actor
- Naomichi Donoue, professional baseball player
- Takehiro Donoue, professional baseball player
- Gaku Hasegawa, politician
- Sho Ito, professional soccer player
- Asahiyutaka Katsuteru, sumo wrestler
- Jurina Matsui, actress
- Company Matsuo, pornographic movie actor/director
- Eiji Okuda, actor and director
