= Jōjō Castle =

Coordinates: 35°14′22″N 136°59′04″E

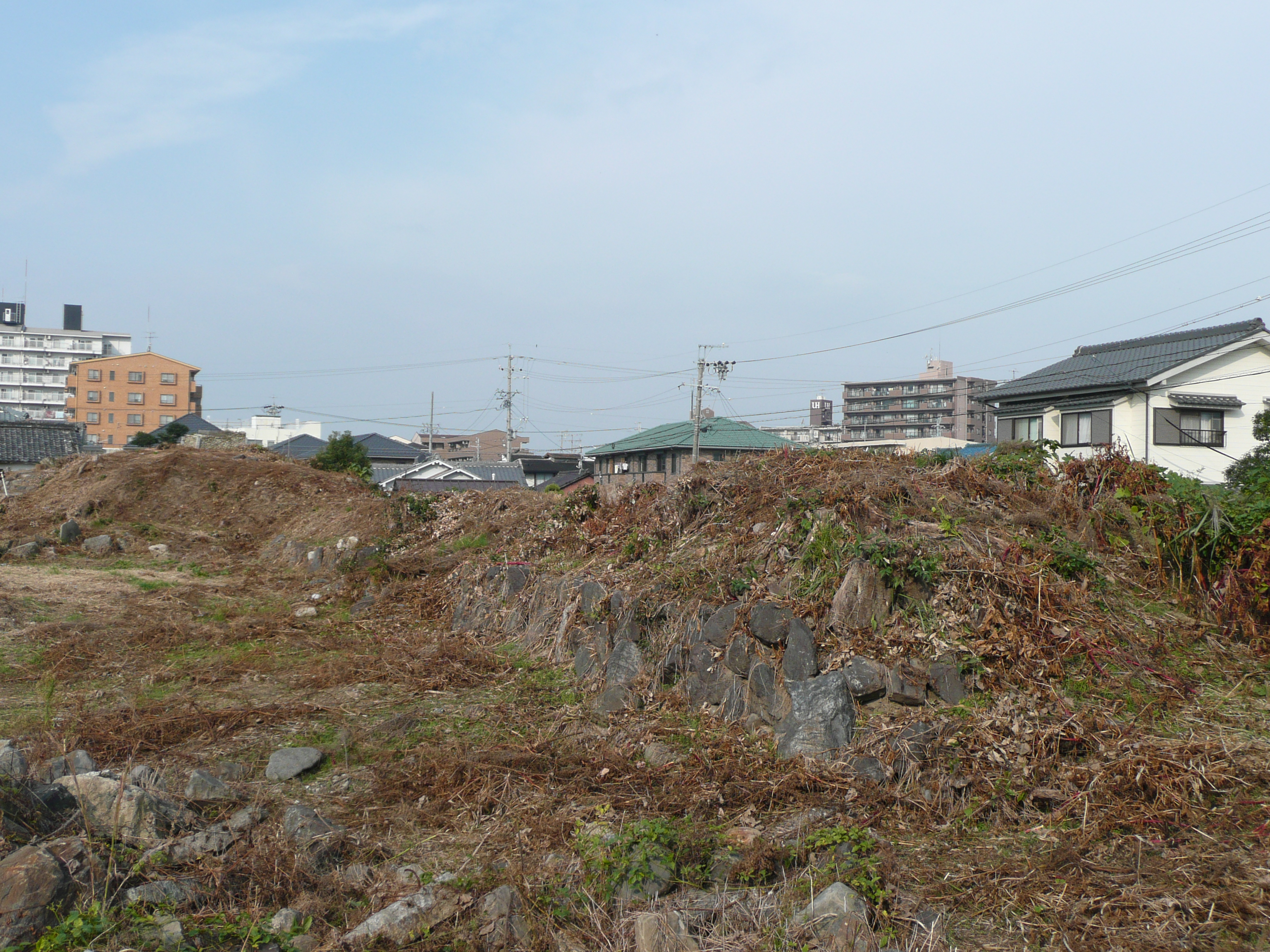
Remains of Jōjō Castle

Jōjō Castle (上条城, Jōjō-jō) was a hirashiro (平城, castle constructed on the plains) located in Kasugai, Aichi Prefecture, Japan. It was built in 1218 by Osaka Kouzen. Currently only ruins are left.

== History ==
From 1558 to 1573, the castle lord was Sassa Narimasa's subordinate. When the Battle of Komaki and Nagakute occurred in 1584, Ikeda Tsuneoki came there. After the war, Toyotomi Hideyoshi stayed at Jōjō Castle. The founder of Higashikasugai, Mayor Hayashi Kimbei, lived here during the Meiji period.
