= Sumitomo Riko =

Japanese manufacturing company

Sumitomo Riko Co. Ltd. 住友理工株式会社
- Company type: Public KK
- Traded as: TYO: 5191; NAG: 5191
- Industry: Rubber & plastic
- Founded: (December 1929; 96 years ago)
- Headquarters: 3-1, Higashi, Komaki, Aichi 485-8550, Japan
- Key people: Yoshiaki Nishimura (President and CEO)
- Products: Automotive parts; IT-related products; Industrial materials
- Revenue: ▲US$ 3.58 billion (FY 2013) (JPY 369 billion) (FY 2013)
- Net income: ▲US$398 million (FY 2013) (JPY 41 billion) (FY 2013)
- Number of employees: 22,546 (as of March 31, 2014)
- Parent: Sumitomo Electric Industries (49.53%)
- Website: Official website

Sumitomo Riko Co. Ltd. (住友理工株式会社, Sumitomo Rikō Kabushiki-gaisha) is a Japanese company which produces rubber and other synthetic resin products.

In June 2014, the company changed its corporate name from Tokai Rubber Industries to Sumitomo Riko to clarify that it is a part of the Sumitomo Group.

Through its subsidiaries in 24 countries, the company claims to hold the largest market share of automotive anti-vibration products. Automotive products account for nearly 80 percent of sales.

== Business segments and products ==
=== Automotive products ===
- Anti-vibration rubber components
- Sound controlling and insulation products
- Automotive hoses
- Modular parts

=== IT-related products ===
- Office automation equipment components
- Precision anti-vibration rubber products

=== Industrial products ===
- Hydraulic hoses
- Rubber hoses

=== Infrastructure application products ===
- Anti-vibration rubber for railway vehicles
- Anti-vibration rubber for industrial machinery
- Seismic isolation bearings for bridges

=== Construction and housing products ===
- Earthquake countermeasures: dampers
- Countermeasures to traffic and other vibrations in the living environment
- Energy-saving products
