= Komaki =

Komaki 小牧市
- City
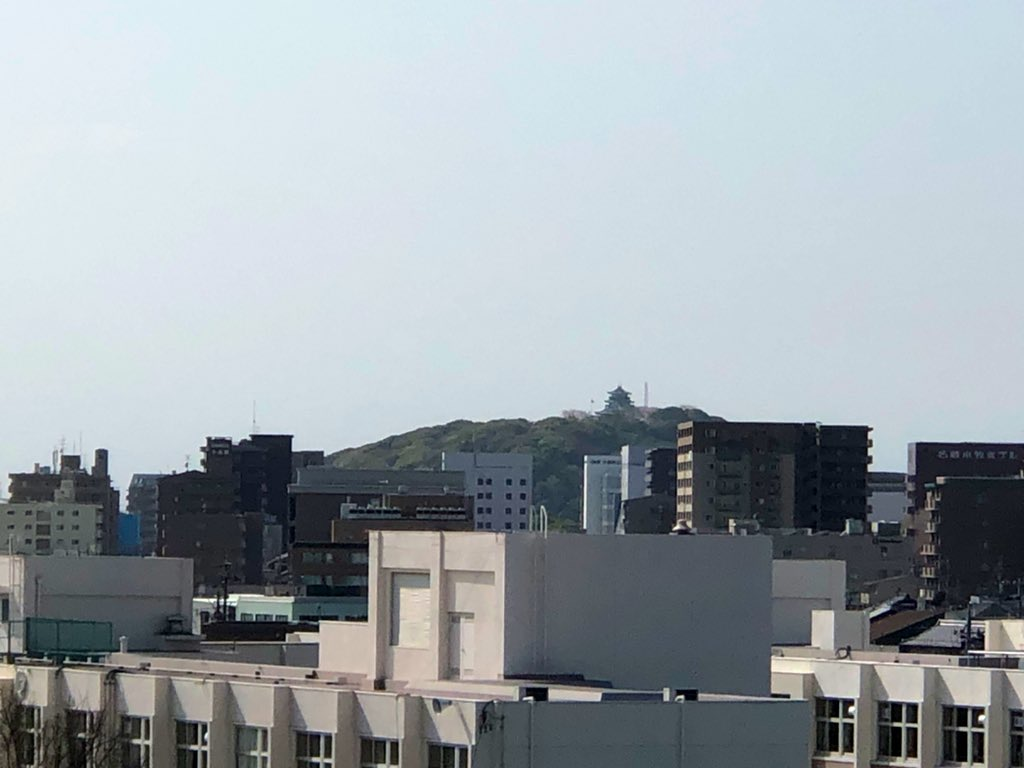
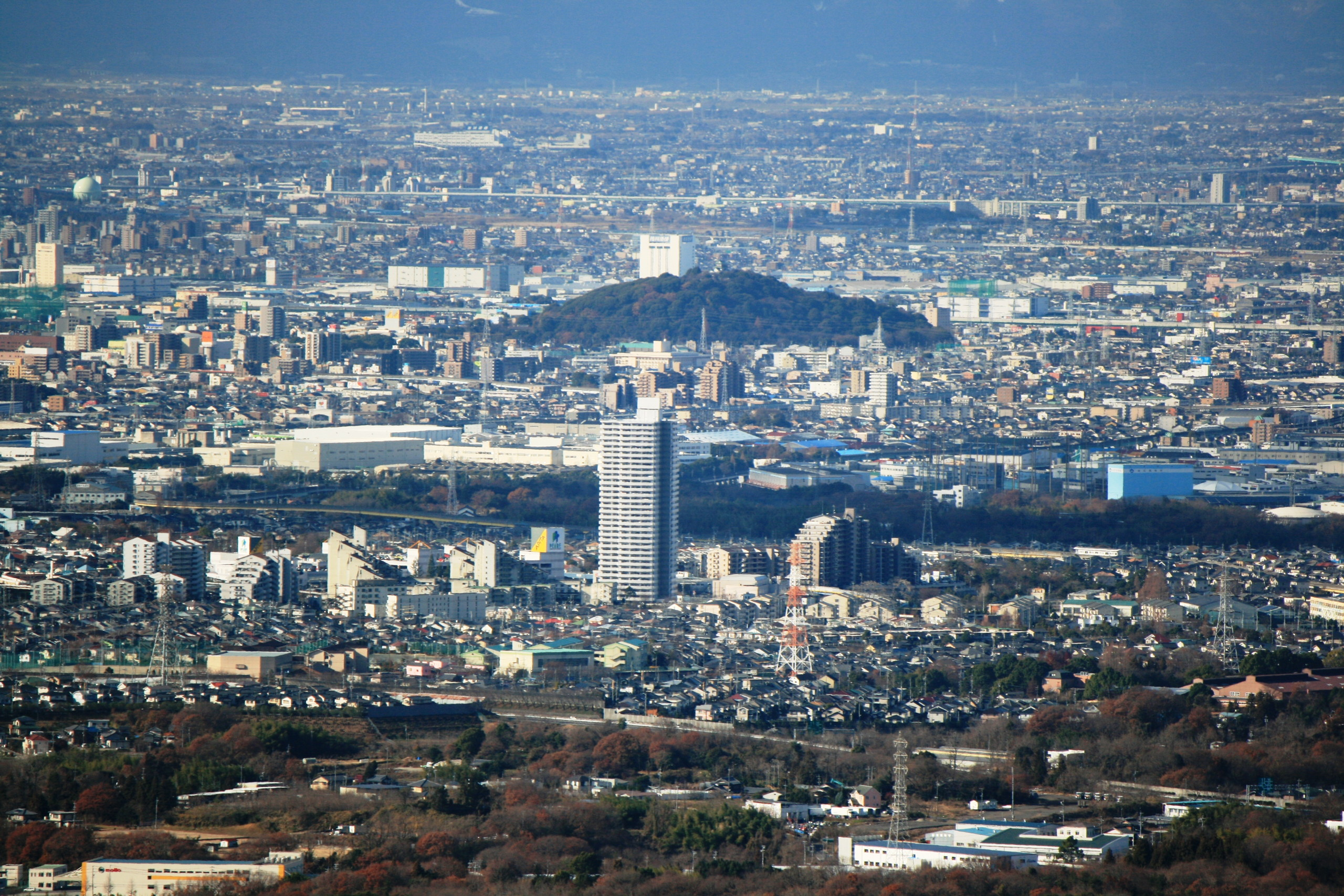
- Upper:Komaki Castle; Lower:Komaki Skyline

- Flag Seal

- Location of Komaki in Aichi Prefecture

- Coordinates: 35°17′27.6″N 136°54′43.6″E
- Country: Japan
- Region: Chūbu (Tōkai)
- Prefecture: Aichi

Government
  - - Mayor: Masaki Amano (since February 2026)

Area
  - Total: 62.81 km^{2} (24.25 sq mi)

Population (1 October 2019)
  - Total: 148,872
  - Density: 2,370/km^{2} (6,139/sq mi)
- Time zone: UTC+9 (Japan Standard Time)
- Tree: Tabunoki (Machilus thunbergii)
- Flower: Azalea
- Phone number: 0568-72-2101
- Address: 1-1 Horinouchi, Komaki-shi, Aichi-ken 485-8650
- Website: Official website

Komaki (小牧市, Komaki-shi) is a city located in Aichi Prefecture, Japan. As of 1 October 2019, the city had an estimated population of 148,872 in 68,174 households, and a population density of 2,370 inhabitants per square kilometre (6,100/sq mi). The total area of the city was 62.81 square kilometres (24.25 sq mi). Komaki is commonly associated with the former Komaki Airport, which is located on the border between Komaki and neighboring Kasugai.

== Geography ==
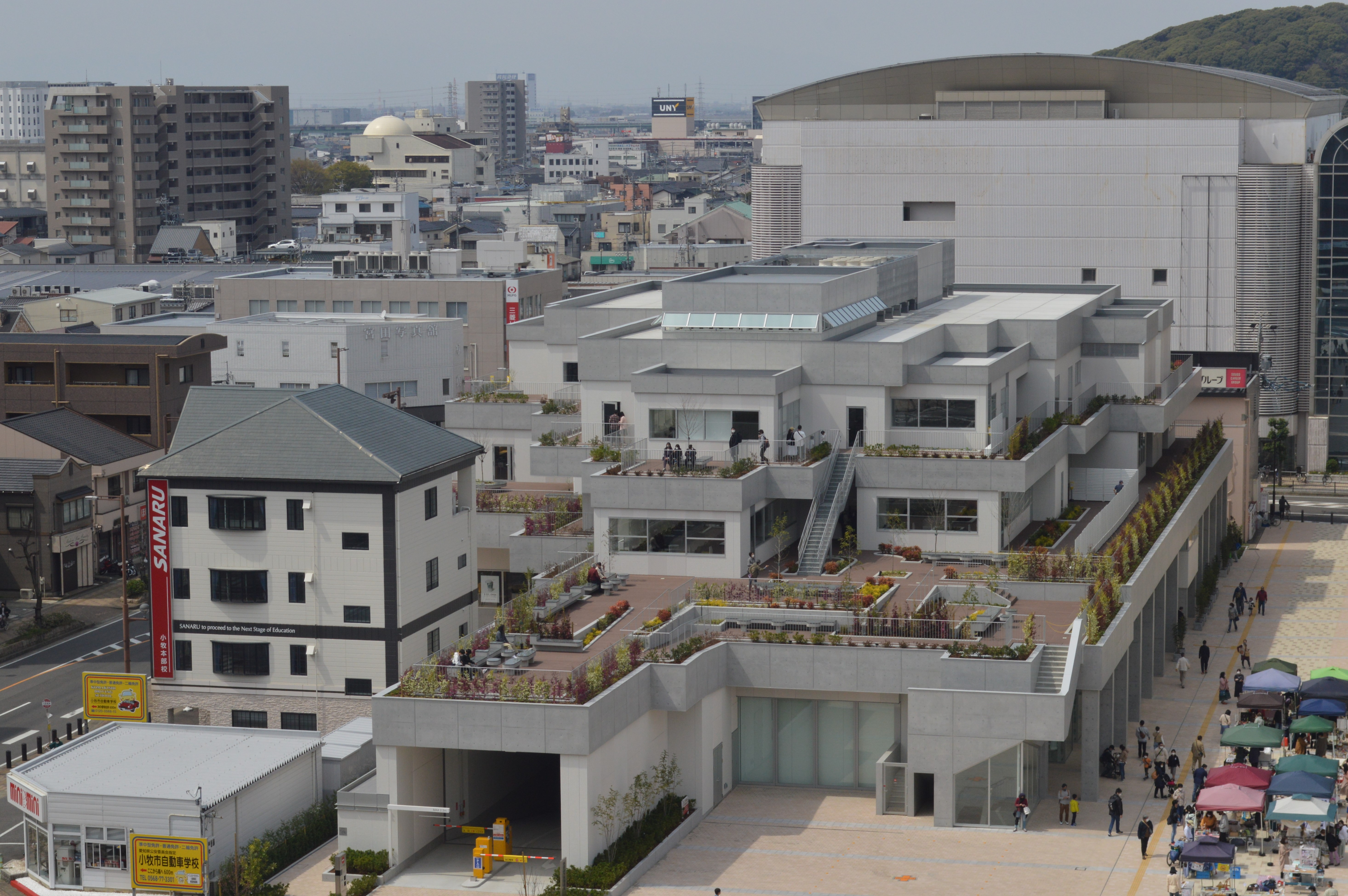
Downtown of Komaki City

Komaki is located in the middle of the Nōbi Plain, west-central Aichi Prefecture, north of the Nagoya metropolis. The city skyline is dominated by Mount Komaki, which is topped with Komaki Castle.

=== Climate ===
The city has a climate characterized by hot and humid summers, and relatively mild winters (Köppen climate classification Cfa). The average annual temperature in Komaki is 15.7 °C (60.3 °F). The average annual rainfall is 1,769 mm (69.6 in) with September as the wettest month. The temperatures are highest on average in August, at around 28.1 °C (82.6 °F), and lowest in January, at around 4.2 °C (39.6 °F).

=== Demographics ===
Per Japanese census data, the population of Komaki has increased rapidly over the past 60 years.

Historical population
Year	Pop.	±%
1960	43,470	—
1970	79,606	+83.1%
1980	103,233	+29.7%
1990	124,441	+20.5%
2000	143,122	+15.0%
2010	147,059	+2.8%

=== Surrounding municipalities ===
Aichi Prefecture

- Inuyama
- Iwakura
- Kasugai
- Kitanagoya
- Kōnan
- Ōguchi
- Toyoyama

== History ==
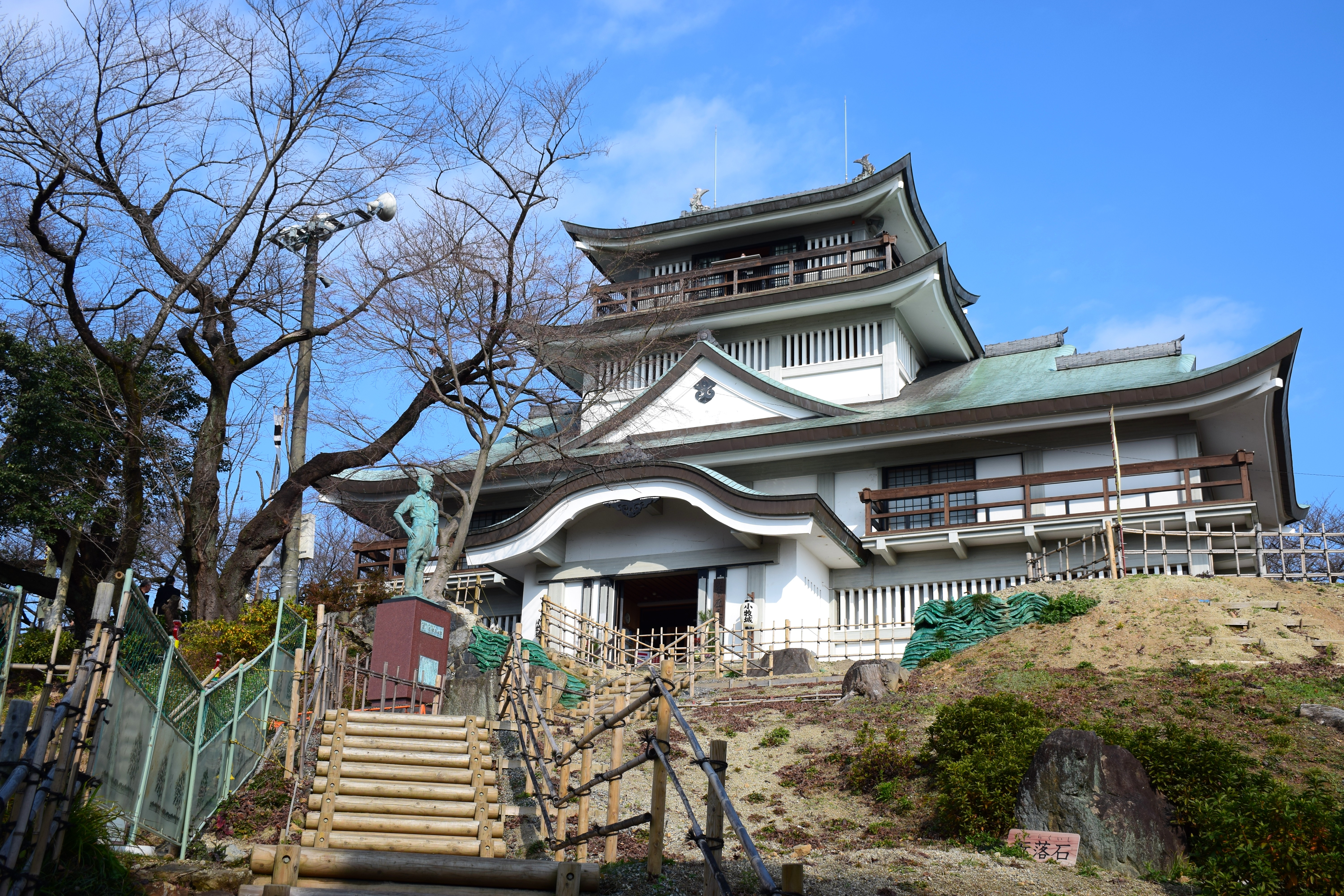
Komakiyama Castle

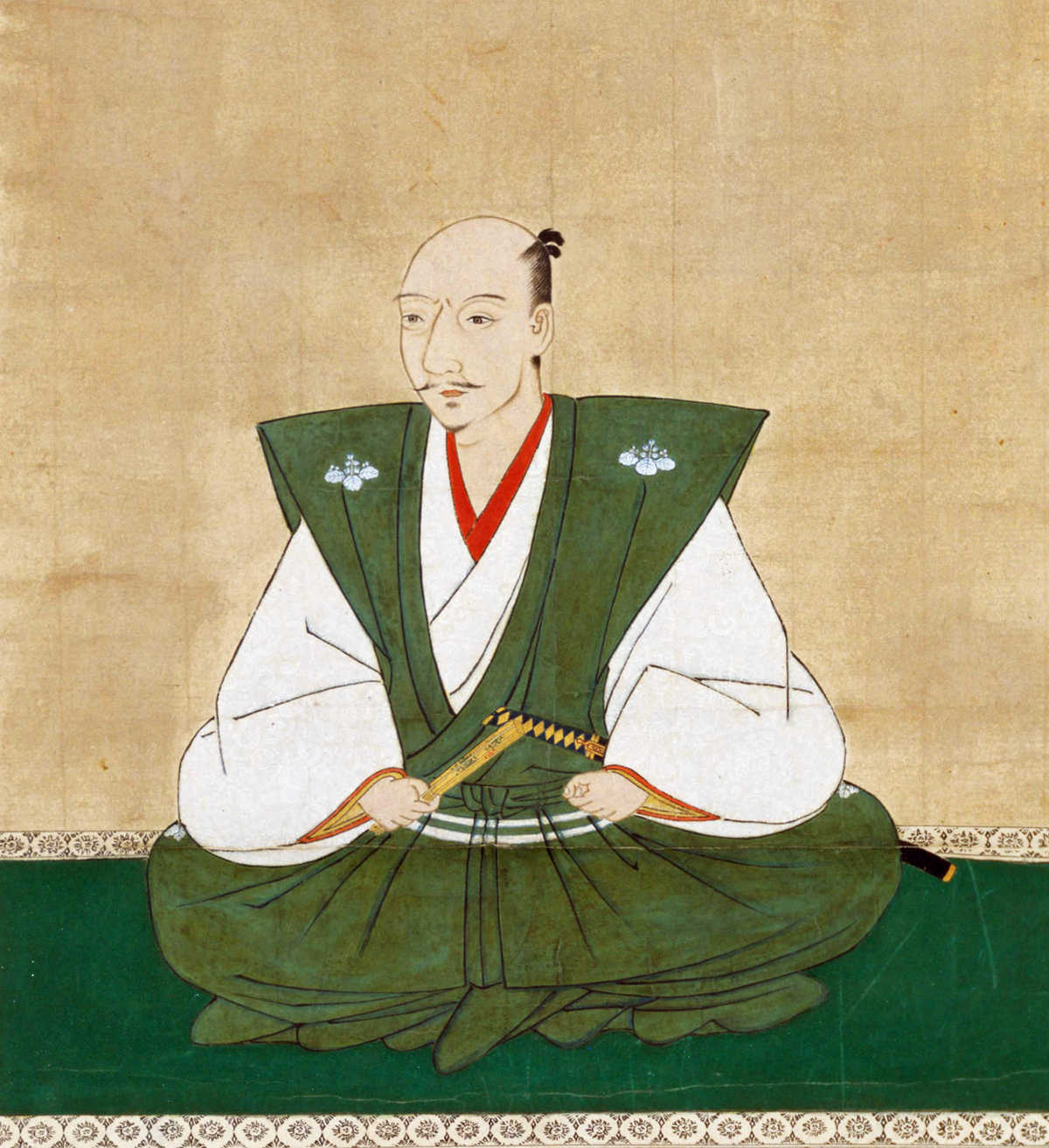
Oda Nobunaga

=== Ancient history ===
Archaeological remains from the Japanese Paleolithic through Yayoi period have been found in what is now Komaki, and burial tumuli from the Kofun period are also common.

=== Feudal period ===
During the Sengoku period, Oda Nobunaga used Komaki Castle as his headquarters from which he launched his invasion of Mino Province and later the area surrounding Mount Komaki was the site of the Battle of Komaki and Nagakute in 1584.

=== Early modern period ===
It was part of the holdings of Owari Domain during the Edo period, and prospered as a post town on the route connecting Nagoya with the Nakasendō highway.

=== Late modern period ===
During the Meiji period establishment of the modern municipalities system, the area was organized into villages under Higashikasugai District, Aichi. Komaki was proclaimed a town on July 16, 1906, through the merger of four villages.

=== Contemporary history ===
Komaki was raised to city status on January 1, 1955, after merging with the village of Kitasato in Nishikasugai District, Aichi.

== Government ==
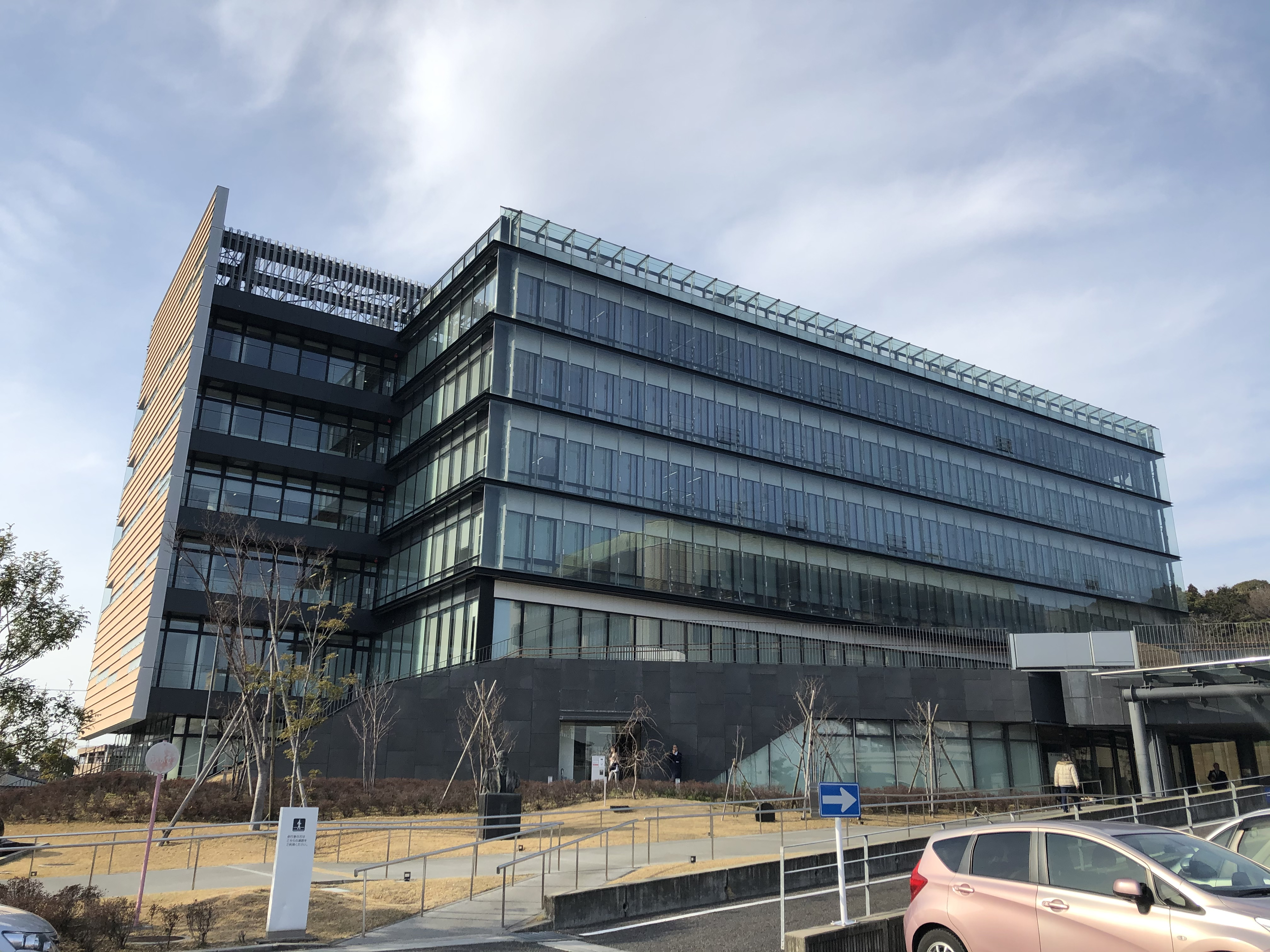
Komaki City hall

Komaki has a mayor-council form of government with a directly elected mayor and a unicameral city legislature of 25 members. The city contributes two members to the Aichi Prefectural Assembly. In terms of national politics, the city is part of Aichi 16th district of the lower house of the Diet of Japan.

== Sister cities ==
=== International ===
Sister cities

- Wyandotte (Michigan, United States, since March 22, 1967. Each year, Wyandotte and Komaki have an exchange student program, allowing students to be hosted by a family in the other city.

Friendship city

- Anyang, Gyeonggi Province, South Korea, since August 1979 (friendship city since 1986)

=== National ===
Friendship city

- Yakumo, Oshima Subprefecture, Hokkaido, since October 24, 1986

== Economy ==
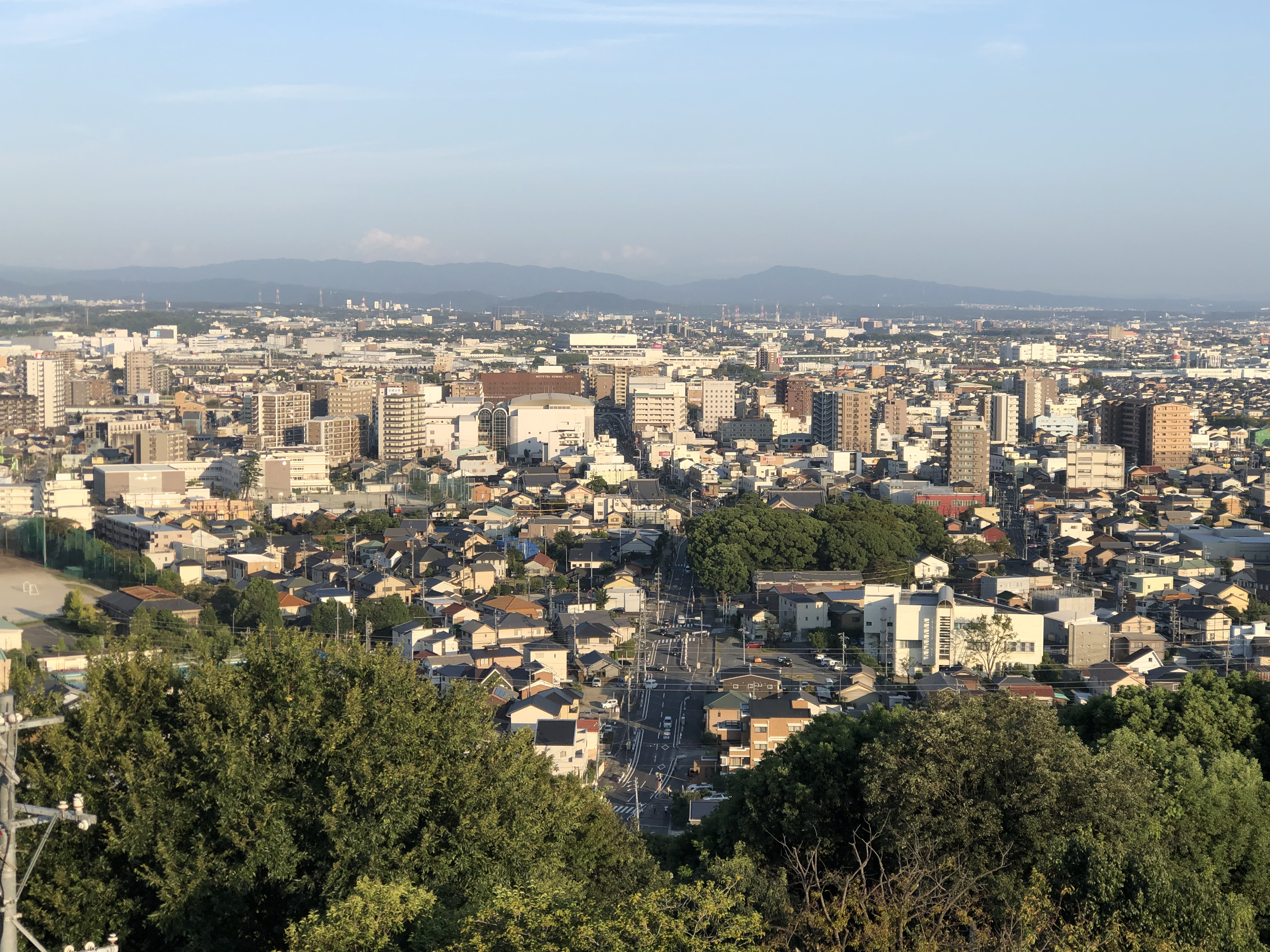
Komaki CBD

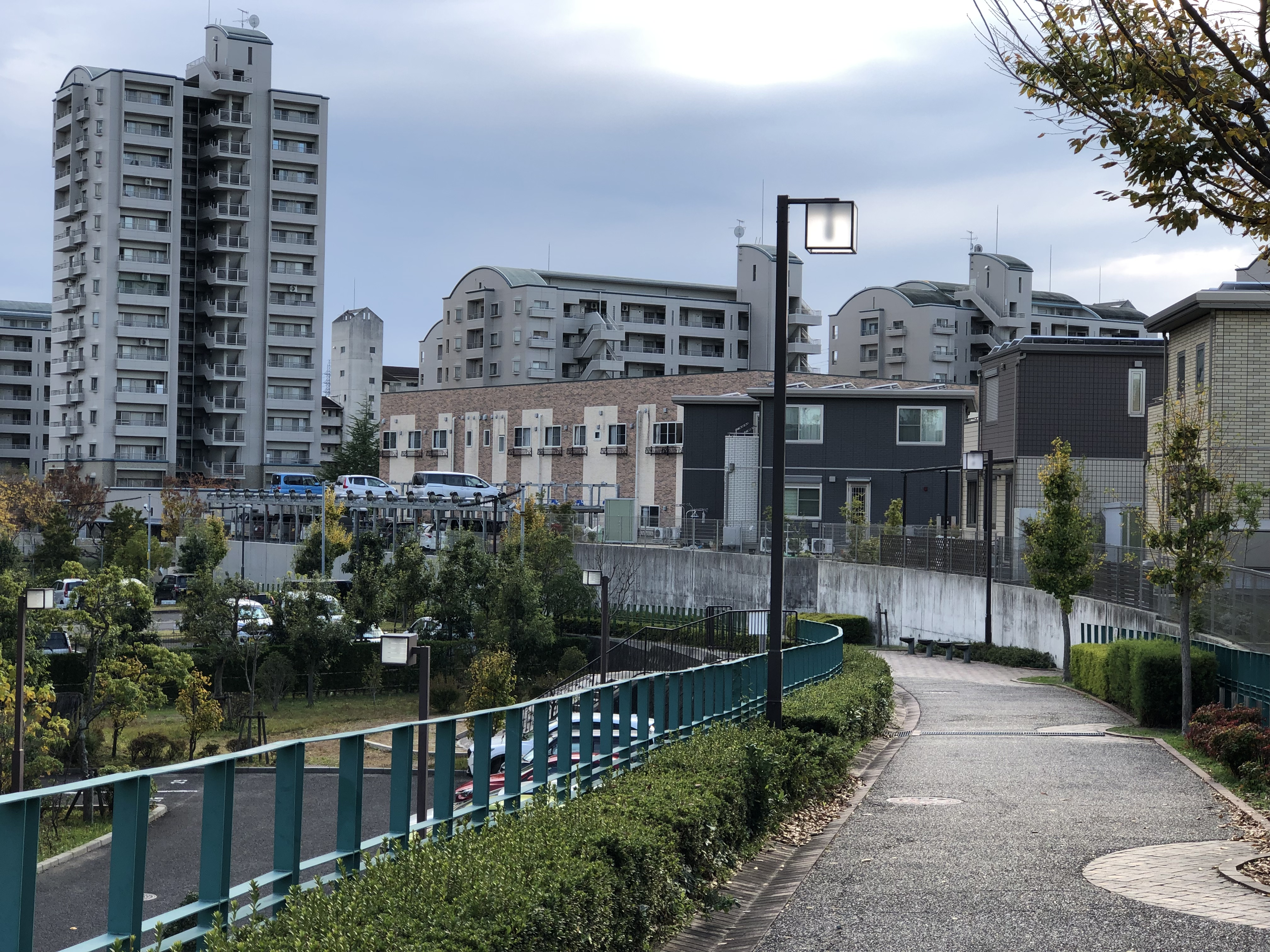
Toukadai New Town

Komaki has a mixed economy, with agriculture (rice and horticulture), commence, and light manufacturing industries playing important roles.

Komaki's GDP per capita (Nominal) was ¥5,859,100 in 2014.

=== Primary sector of the economy ===
==== Agriculture ====
- Peach
- Rice

==== Poultry farming ====
- Nagoya Cochin chicken

=== Secondary sector of the economy ===
==== Manufacturing ====
Sumitomo Riko (Previously known as Tokai Gomme), a global rubber and synthetic resin products manufacturing company, whose automotive anti-vibration components hold the largest global market share, has its headquarters in the city.

=== Tertiary sector of the economy ===
==== Commerce ====
Due to its highway connections with the Nagoya metropolis, it is also becoming a bedroom community.

=== Companies headquartered in Komaki ===
- COMO
- SATO FOODS INDUSTRIES
- santec
- CKD Corporation
- Sumitomo Riko
- Taihei Machinery Works
- Tsunoda Co
- HOUTOKU Co
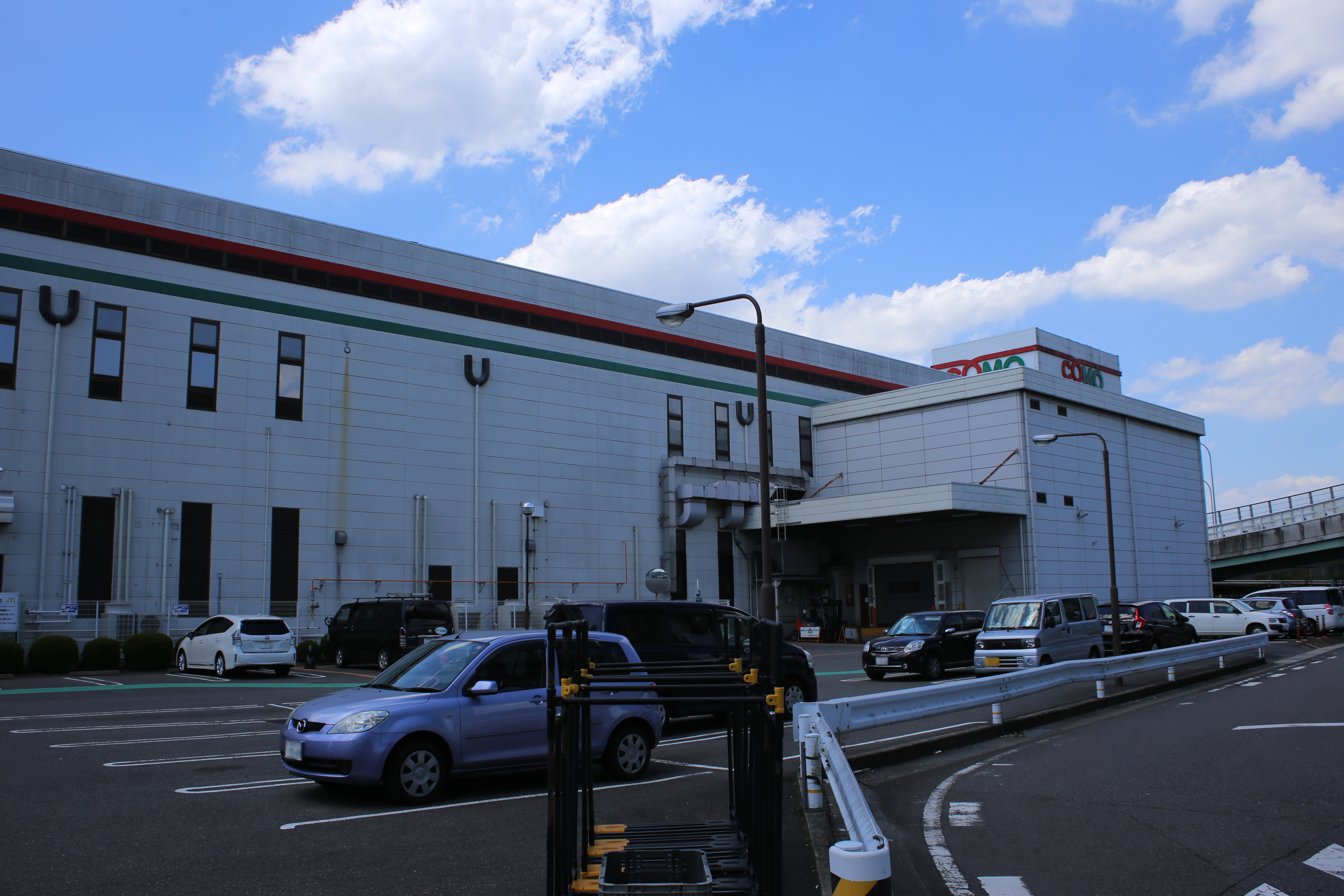
COMO

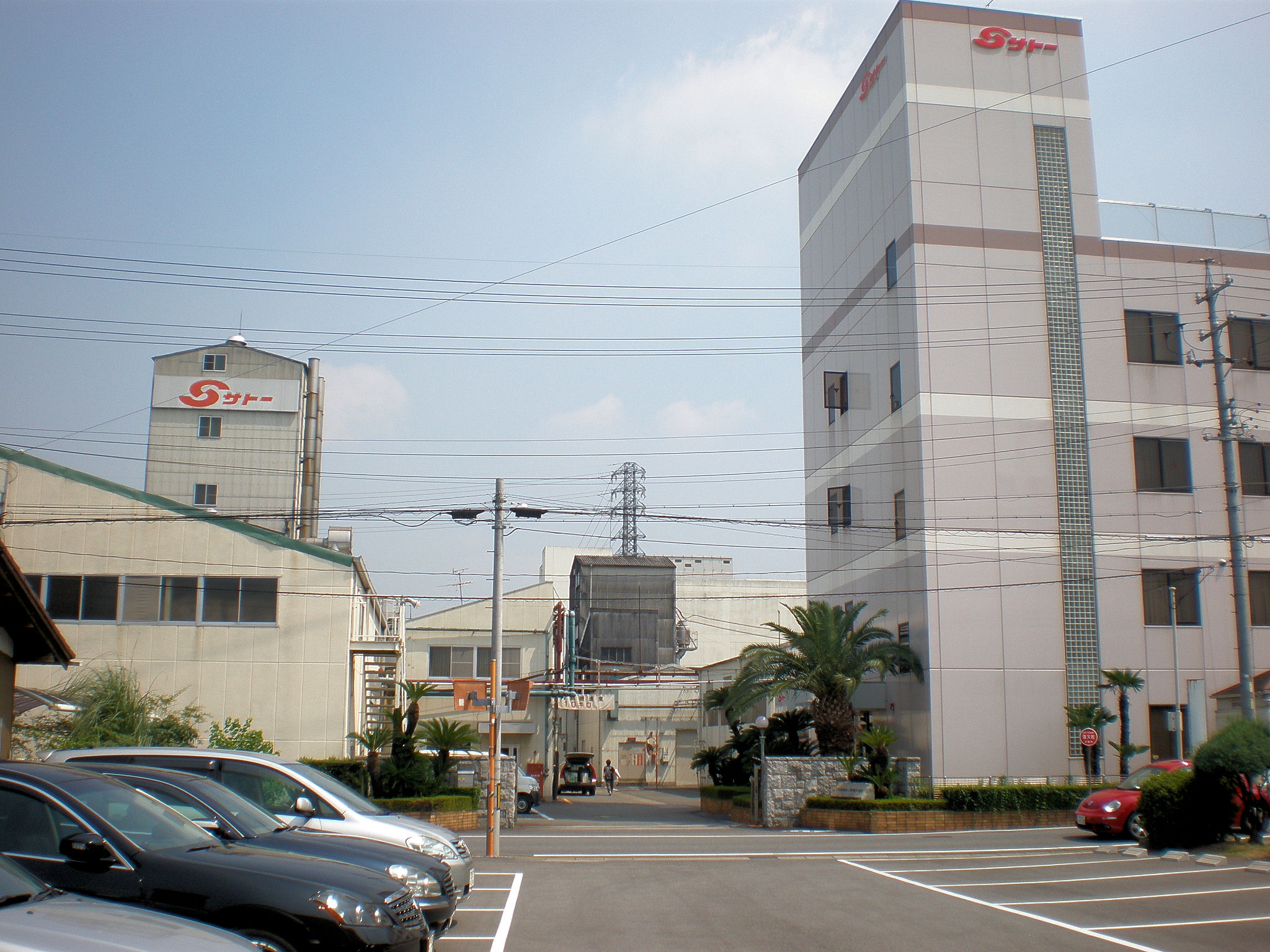
SATO FOODS INDUSTRIES

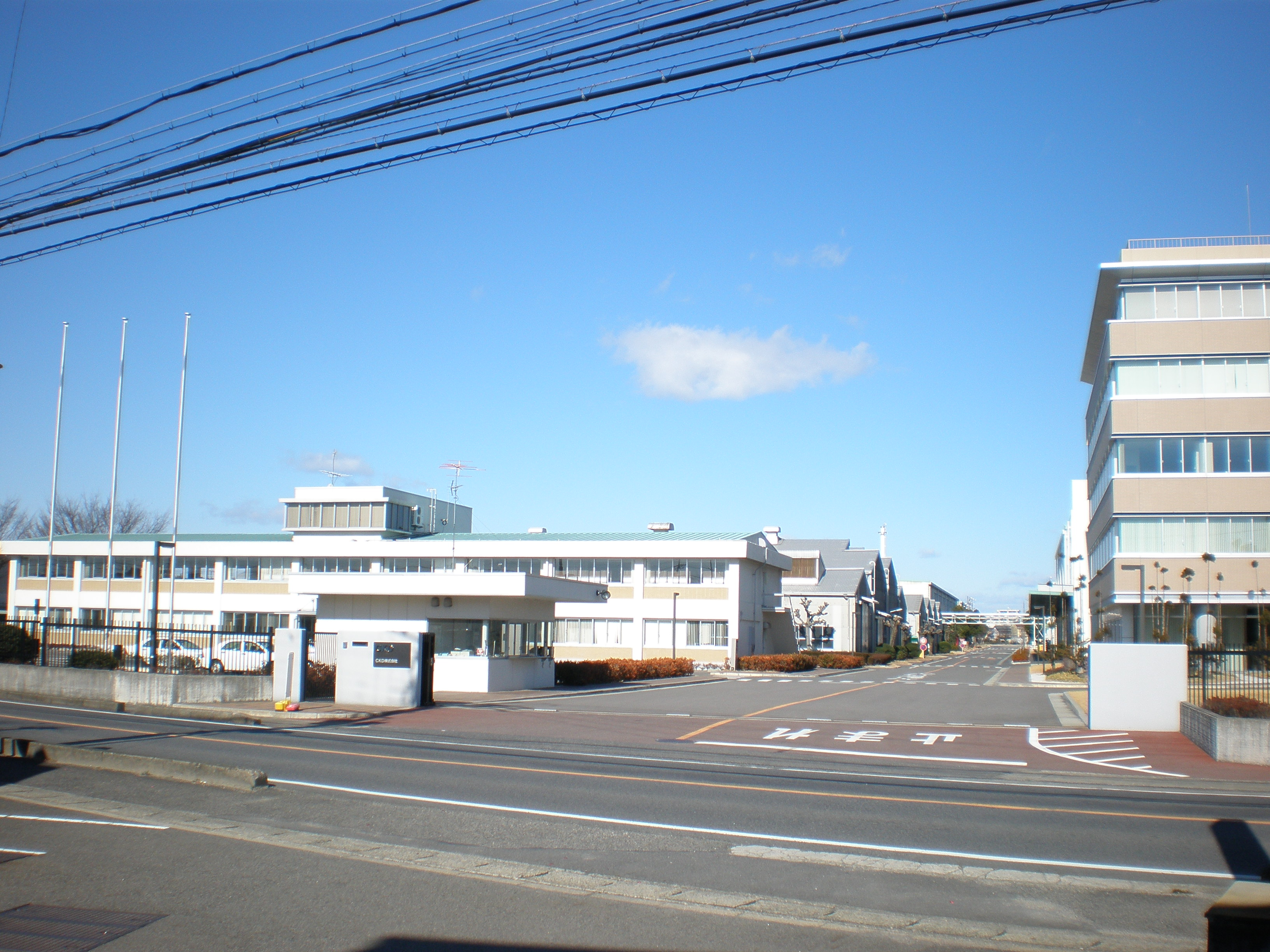
CKD Corporation

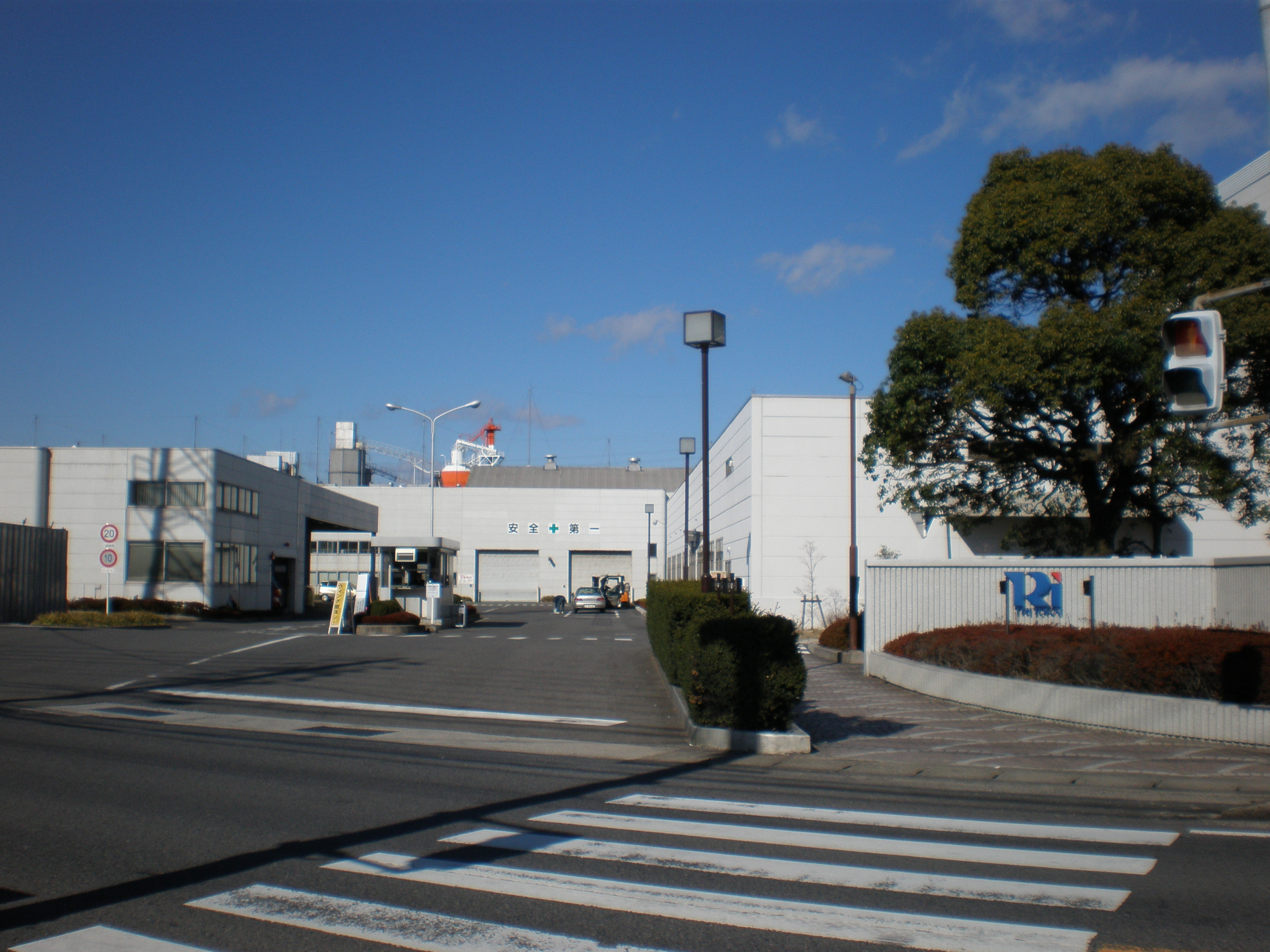
Sumitomo Riko

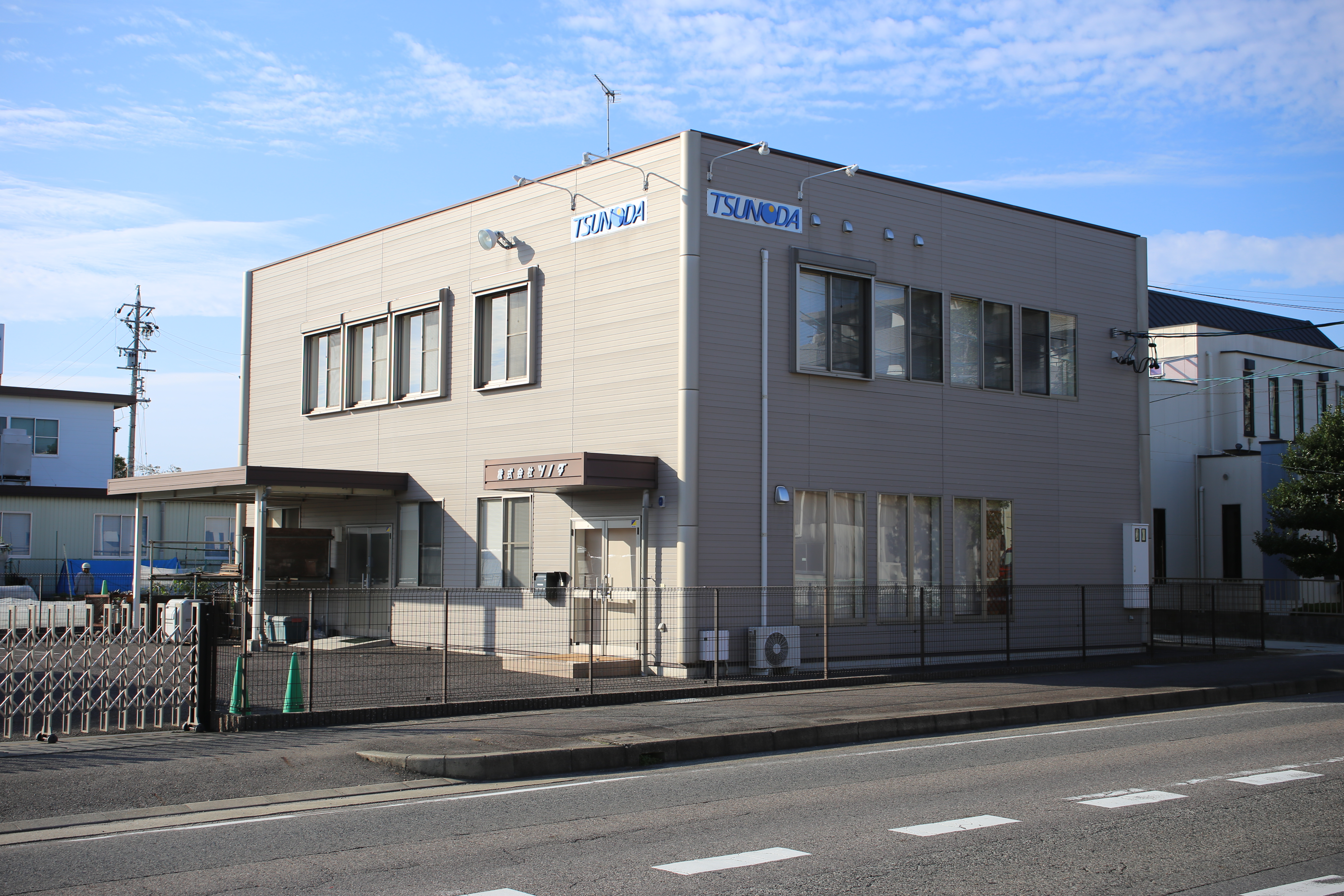
Tsunoda

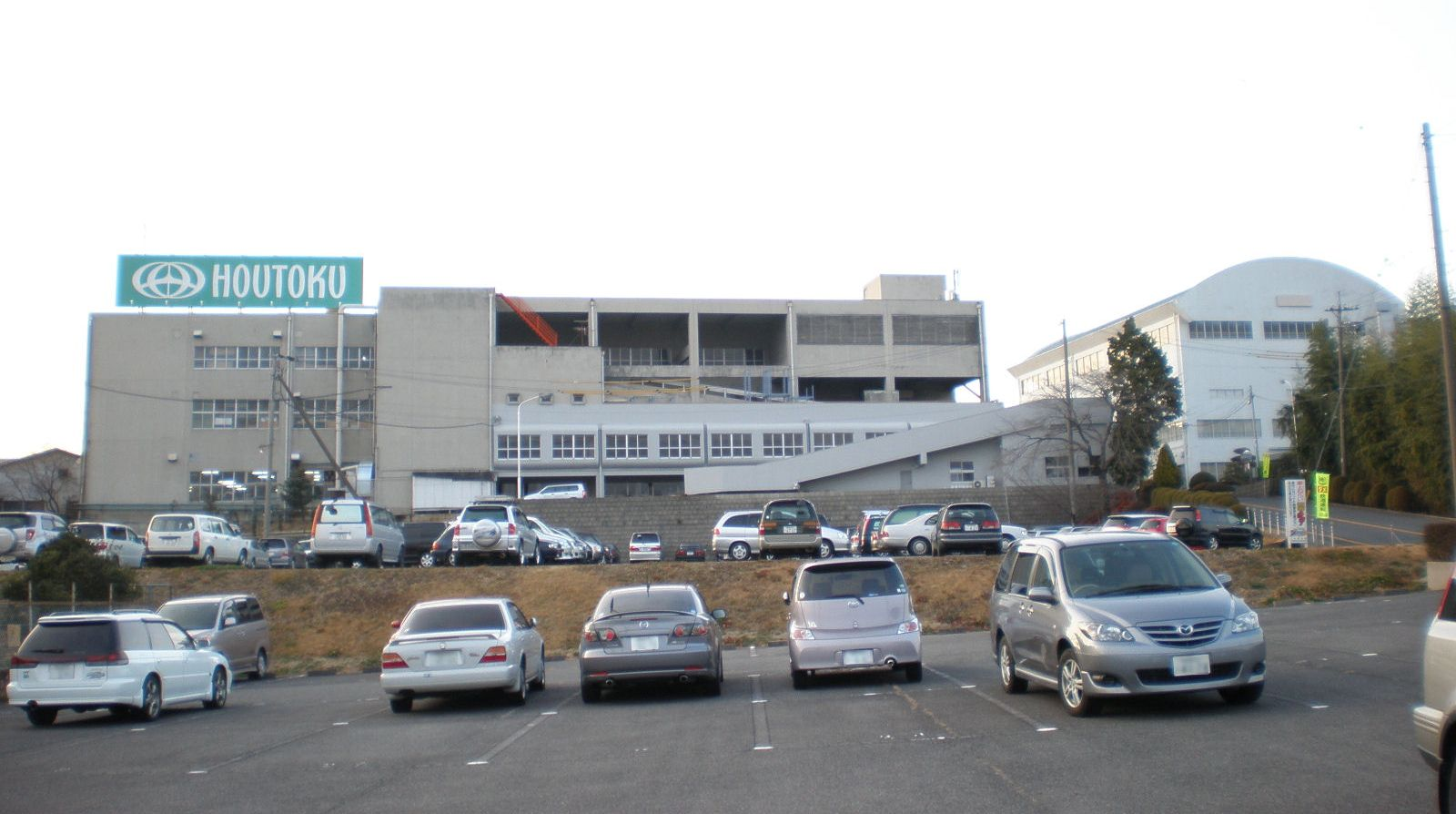
HOUTOKU Co

== Education ==
=== Universities ===
- Aichi Bunkyo University
- Nagoya Zokei University

=== Schools ===
Elementary and secondary education

Komaki has 16 public elementary schools and nine public junior high schools operated by the city government, and three public high schools operated by the Aichi Prefectural Board of Education. There is also one private high school. The prefecture also operates one special education school for the handicapped.

=== International School ===
- The Colégio Dom Bosco, a Brazilian school was formerly located in Komaki.
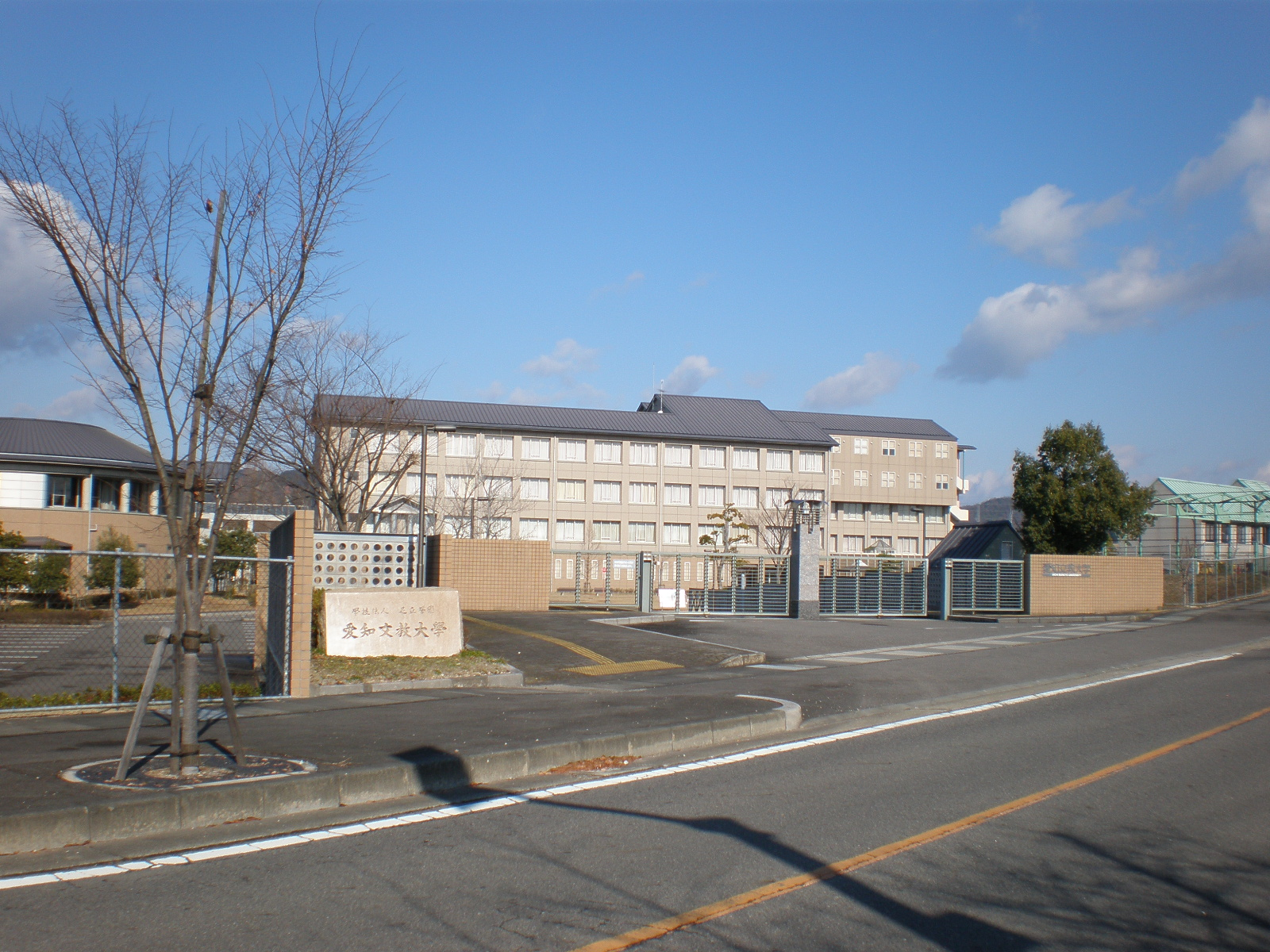
Aichi Bunkyo University

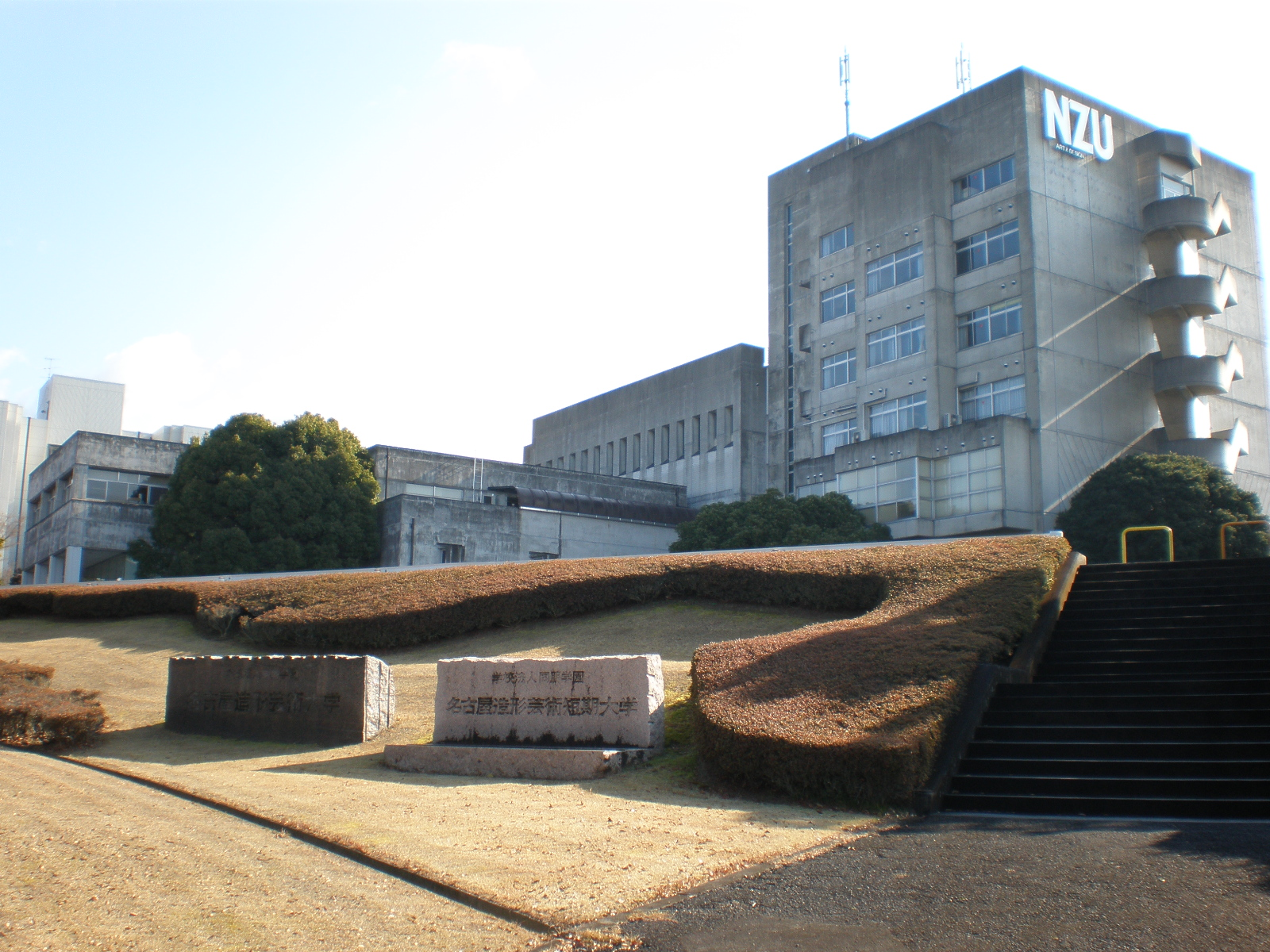
Nagoya Zokei University

== Transportation ==
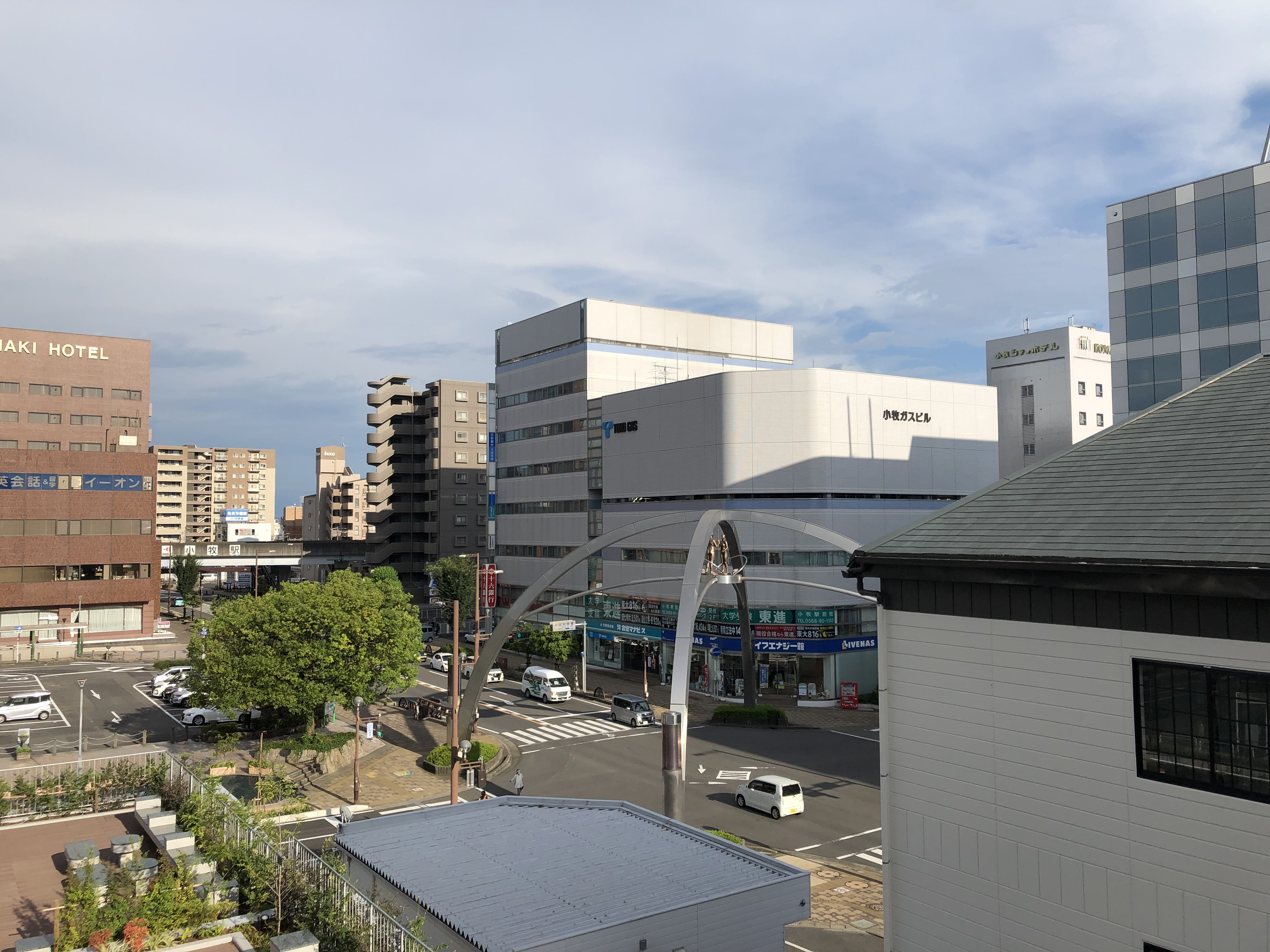
Around Komaki Station

=== Airways ===
==== Airports ====
- Nagoya Airport (Komaki Airport)

=== Railways ===
==== Conventional lines ====
Meitetsu

- Komaki Line: - Komakiguchi - Komaki - Komakihara - Ajioka - Tagata-jinja-mae -

The Peachliner, formally the Tōkadai Shin-kōtsū Peach Liner (桃花台新交通ピーチライナー) was a people mover which operated from 1991 until September 30, 2006, when it became the first people-mover system in Japan to cease operations.

=== Roads ===
==== Expressways ====
- Chūō Expressway
- Meishin Expressway (Asian Highway Network)
- Tōmei Expressway (Asian Highway Network)
- Route 11 (Nagoya Expressway)

==== Japan National Route ====
- National Route 41
- National Route 155
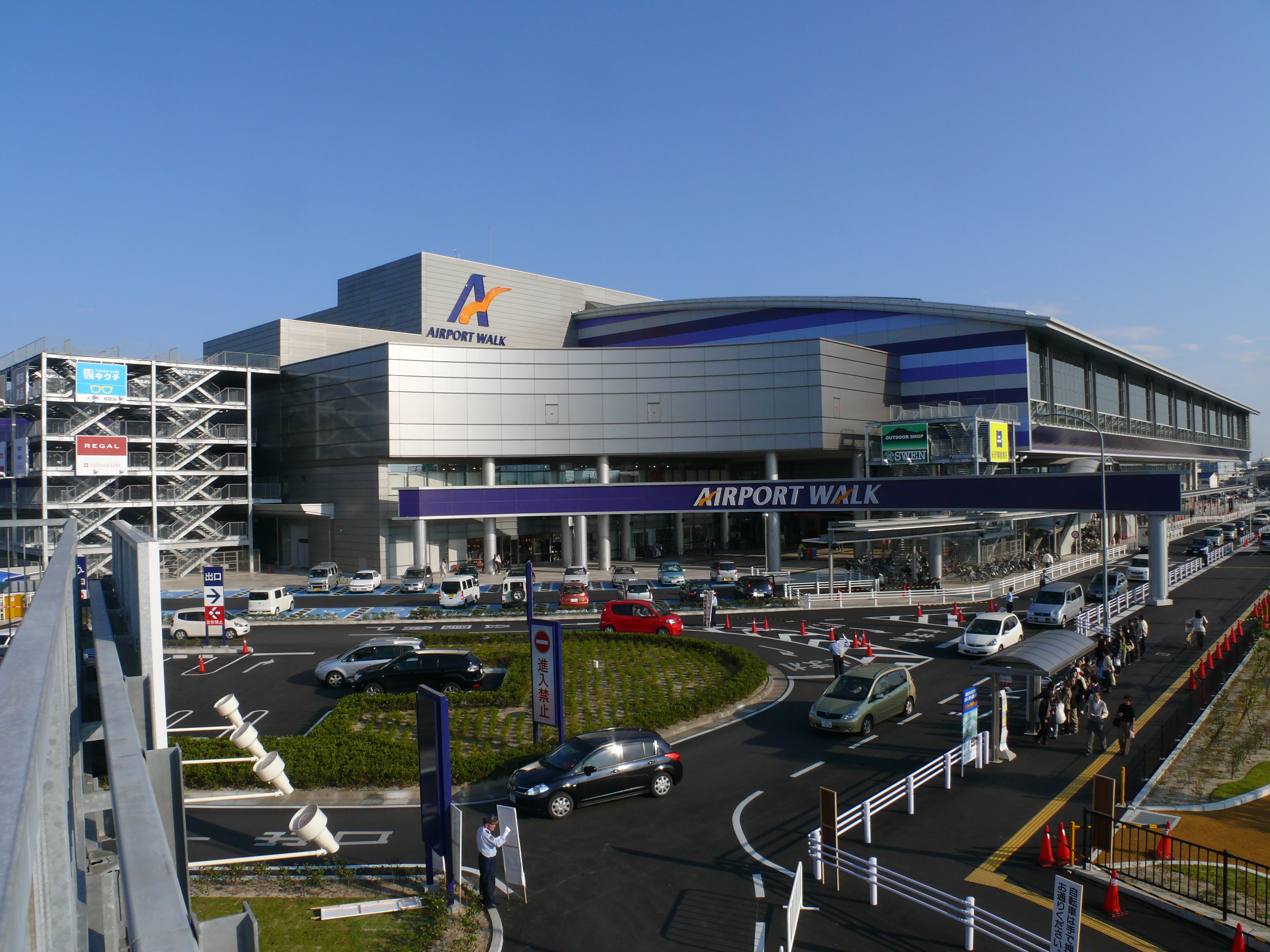
Nagoya Airport(Komaki Airport)

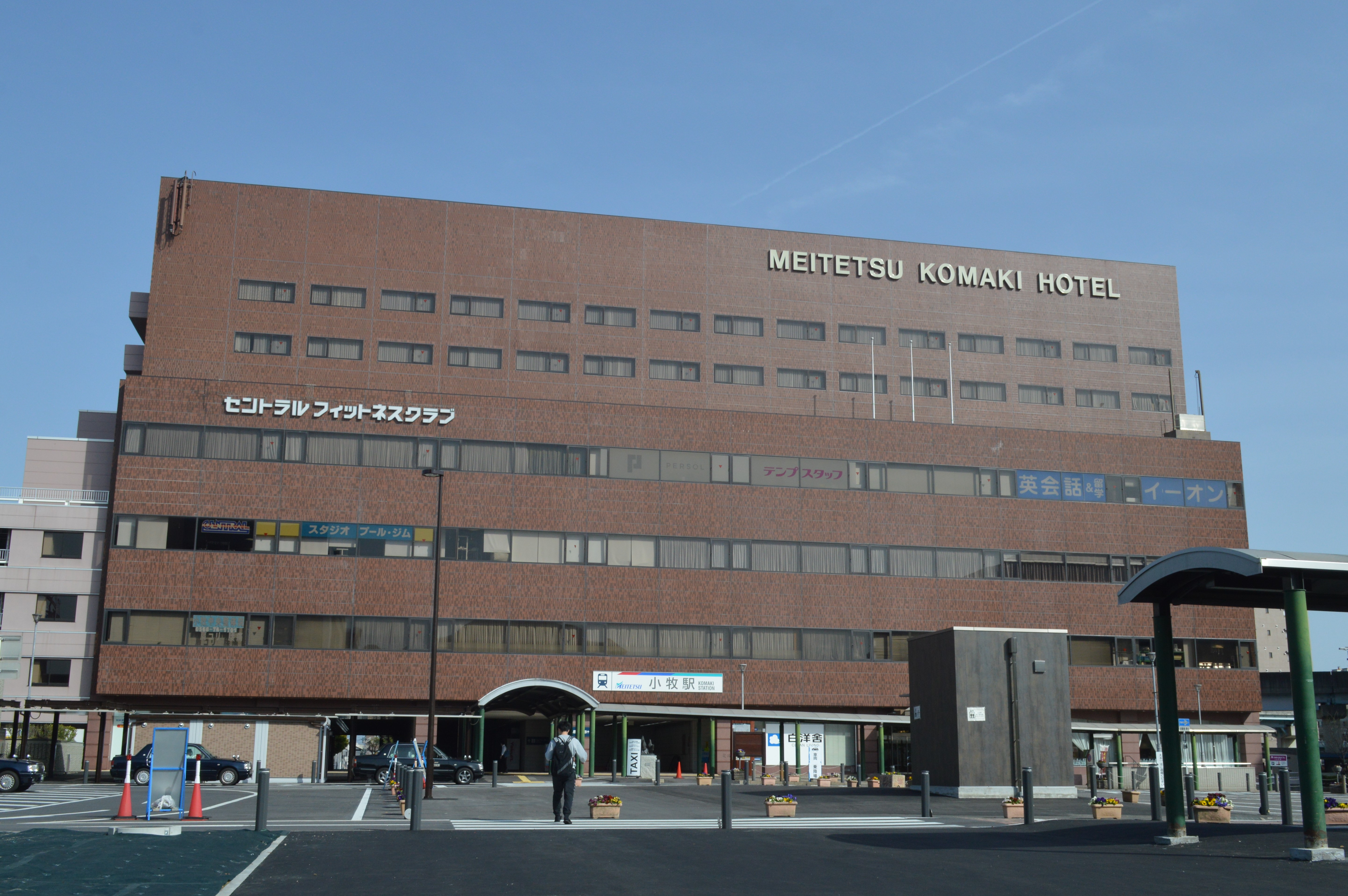
Komaki Station

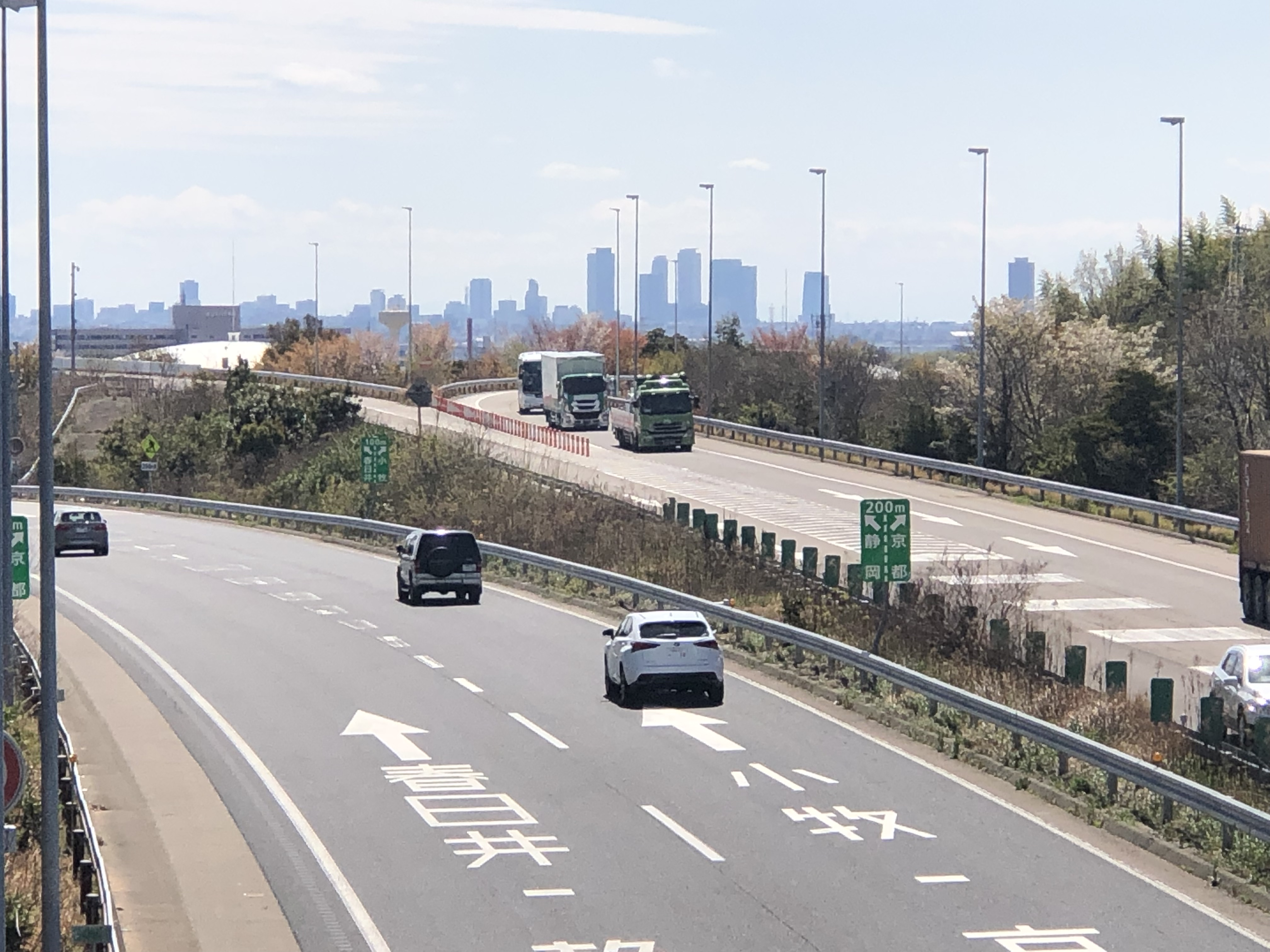
Komaki Junction

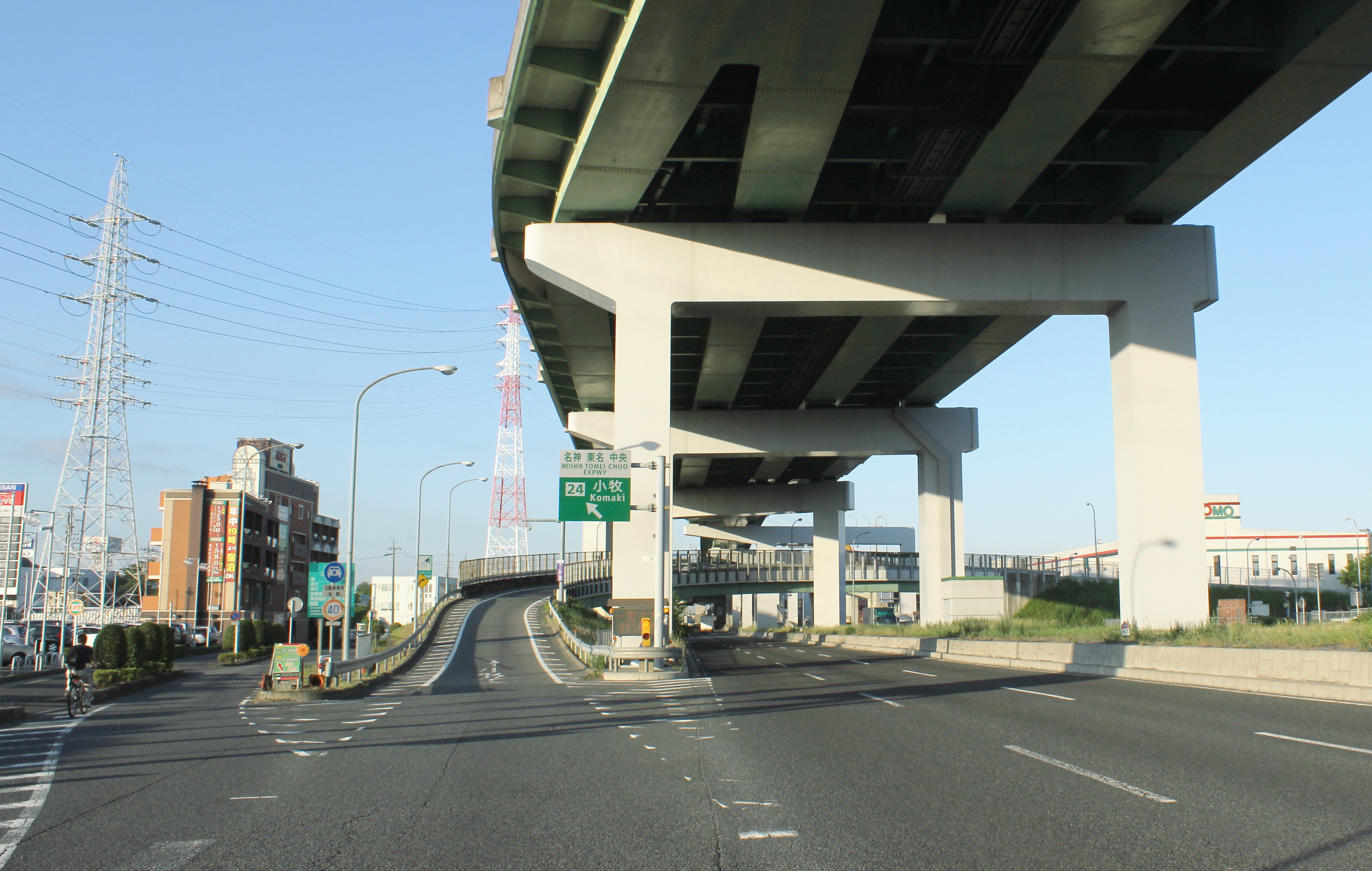
Komaki Interchange

== Local attractions ==
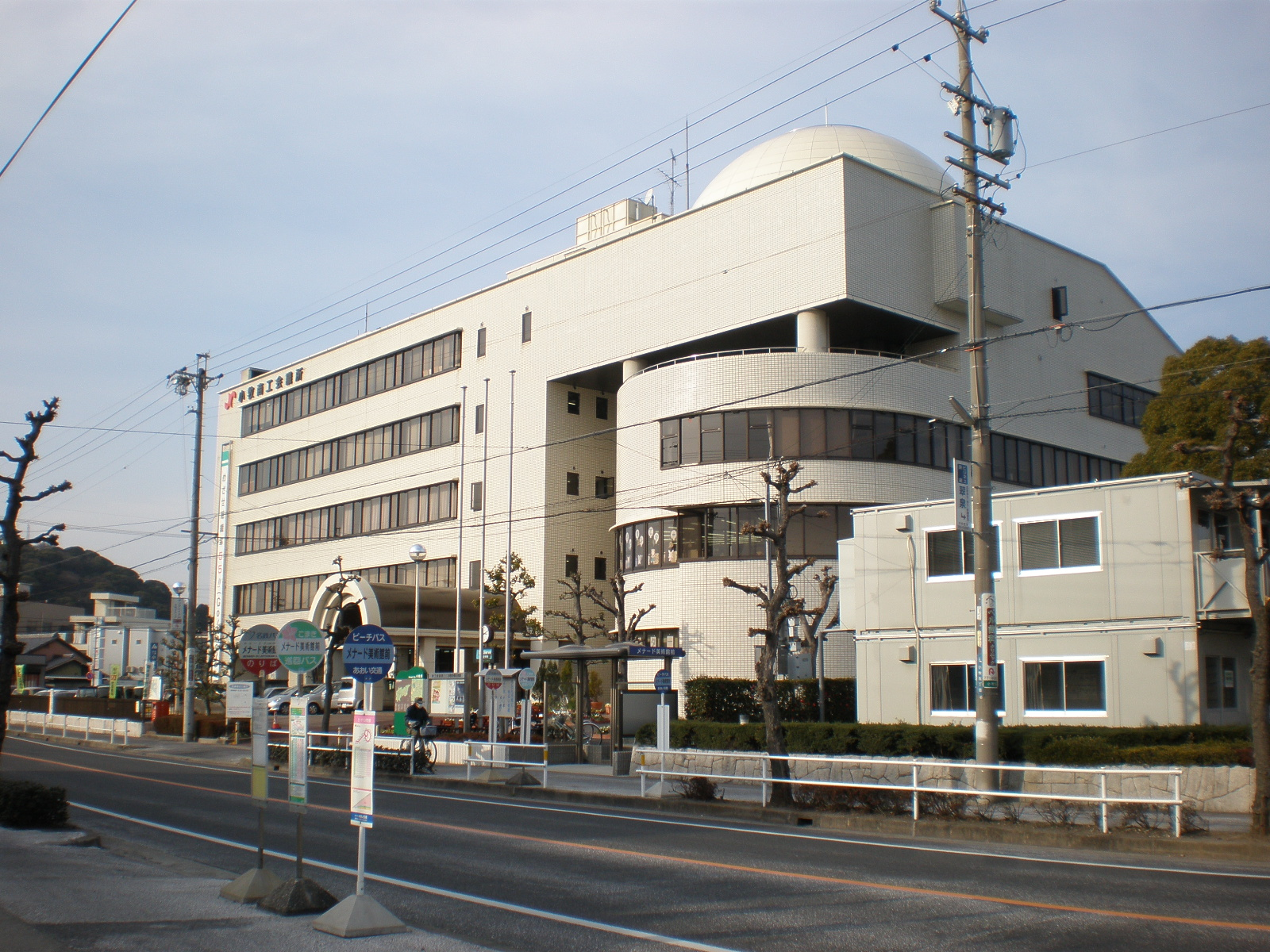
Komaki Central Public Hall

Historic sites

- Iwaya Kofun
- Komaki shuku (Kishida house)
- Mount Komaki (Komaki Castle)
- Ryūon-ji temple (Mama Kannon)
- Shinooka Kiln ruins
- Tagata Jinja
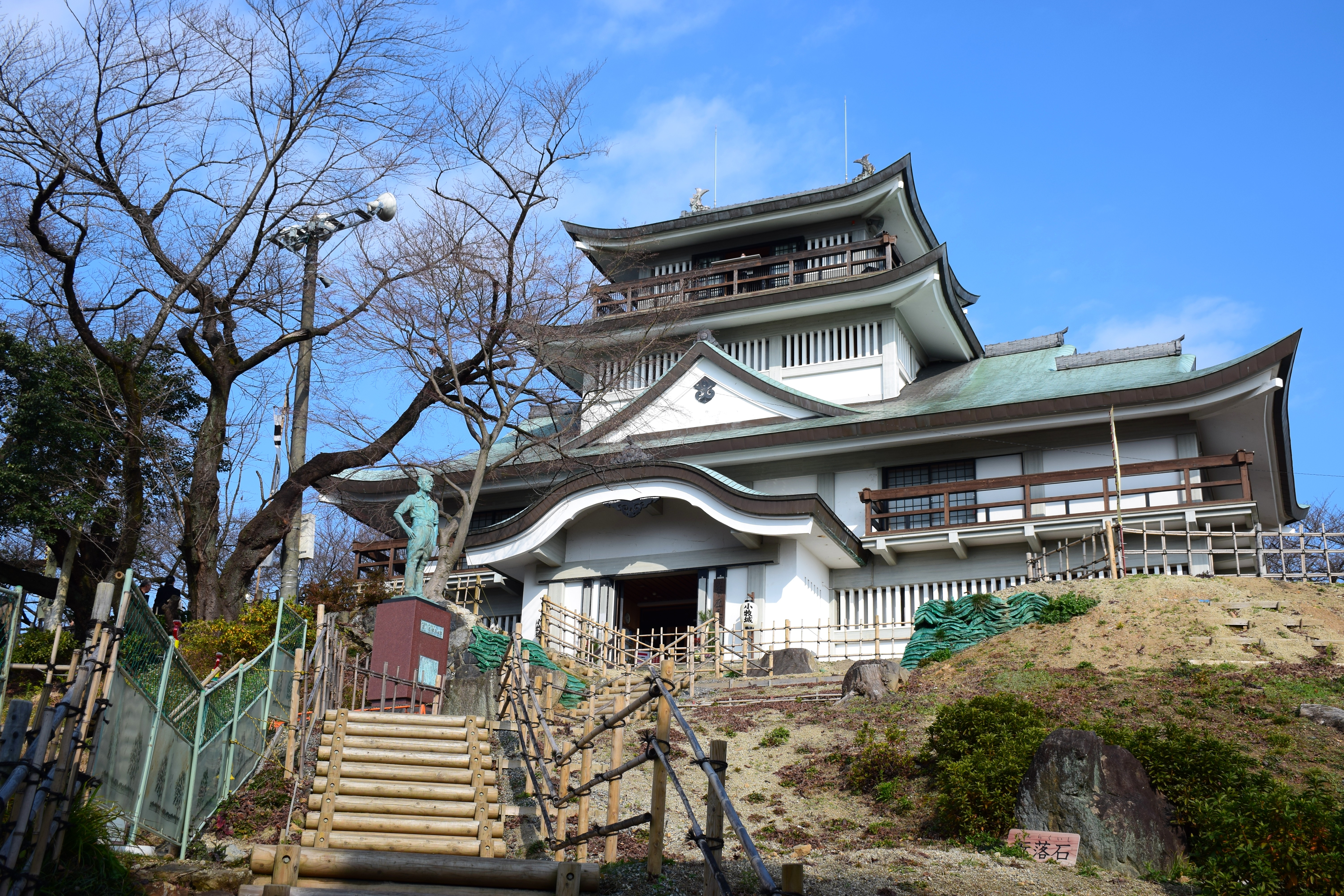
Komaki Castle museum

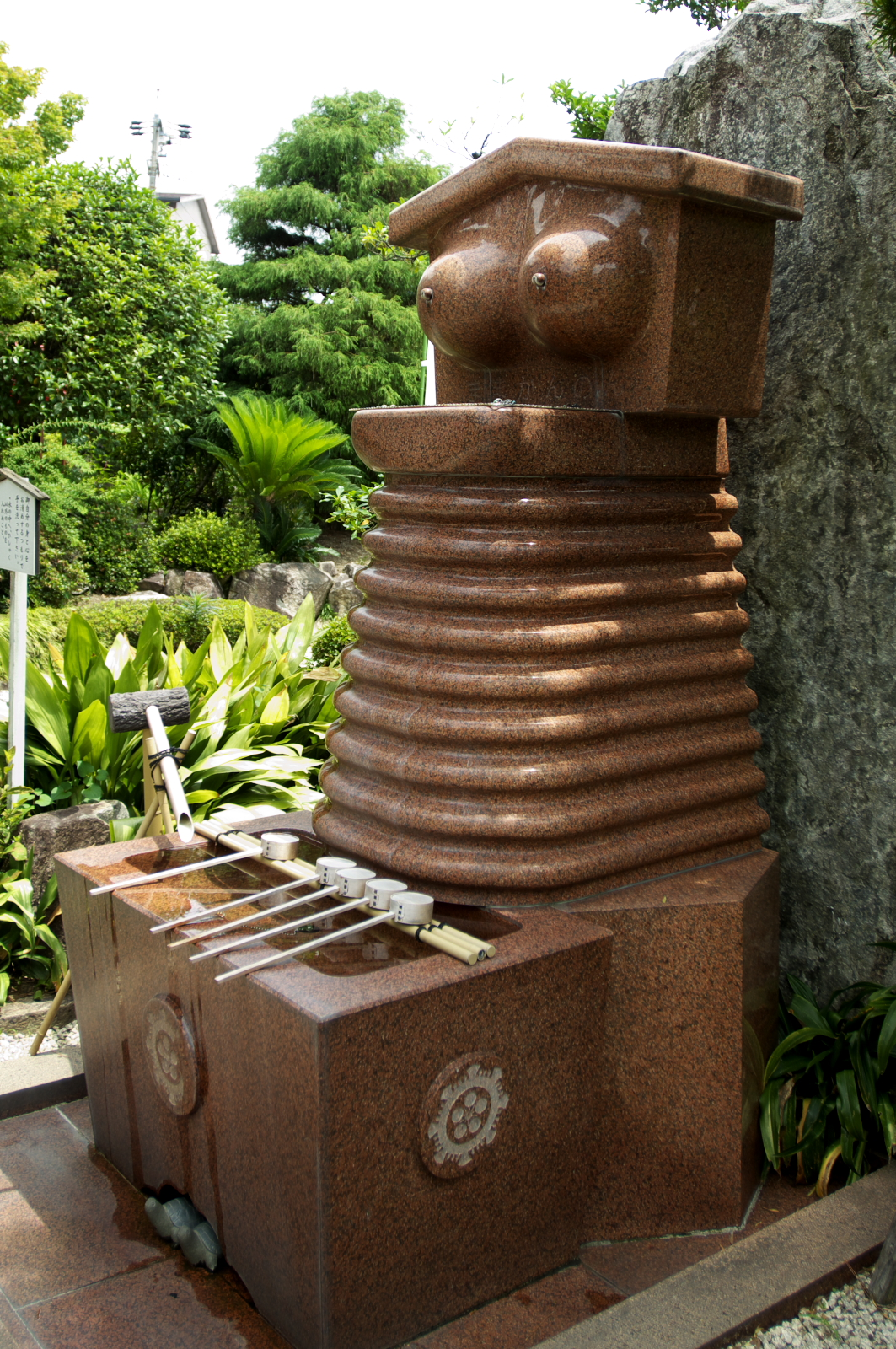
Ryūon-ji
(Mama Kannon)

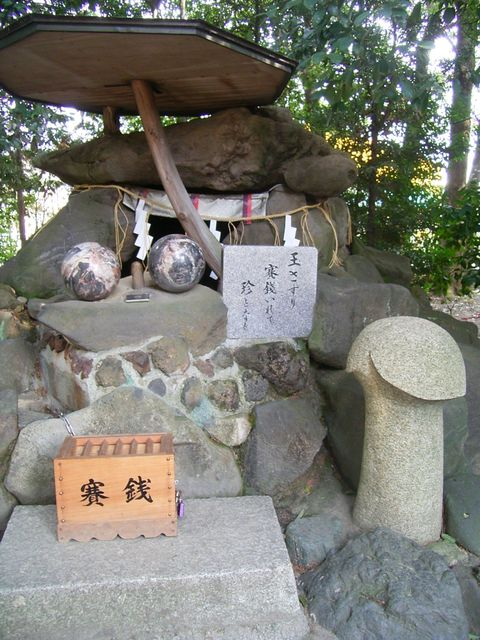
Tagata Jinja

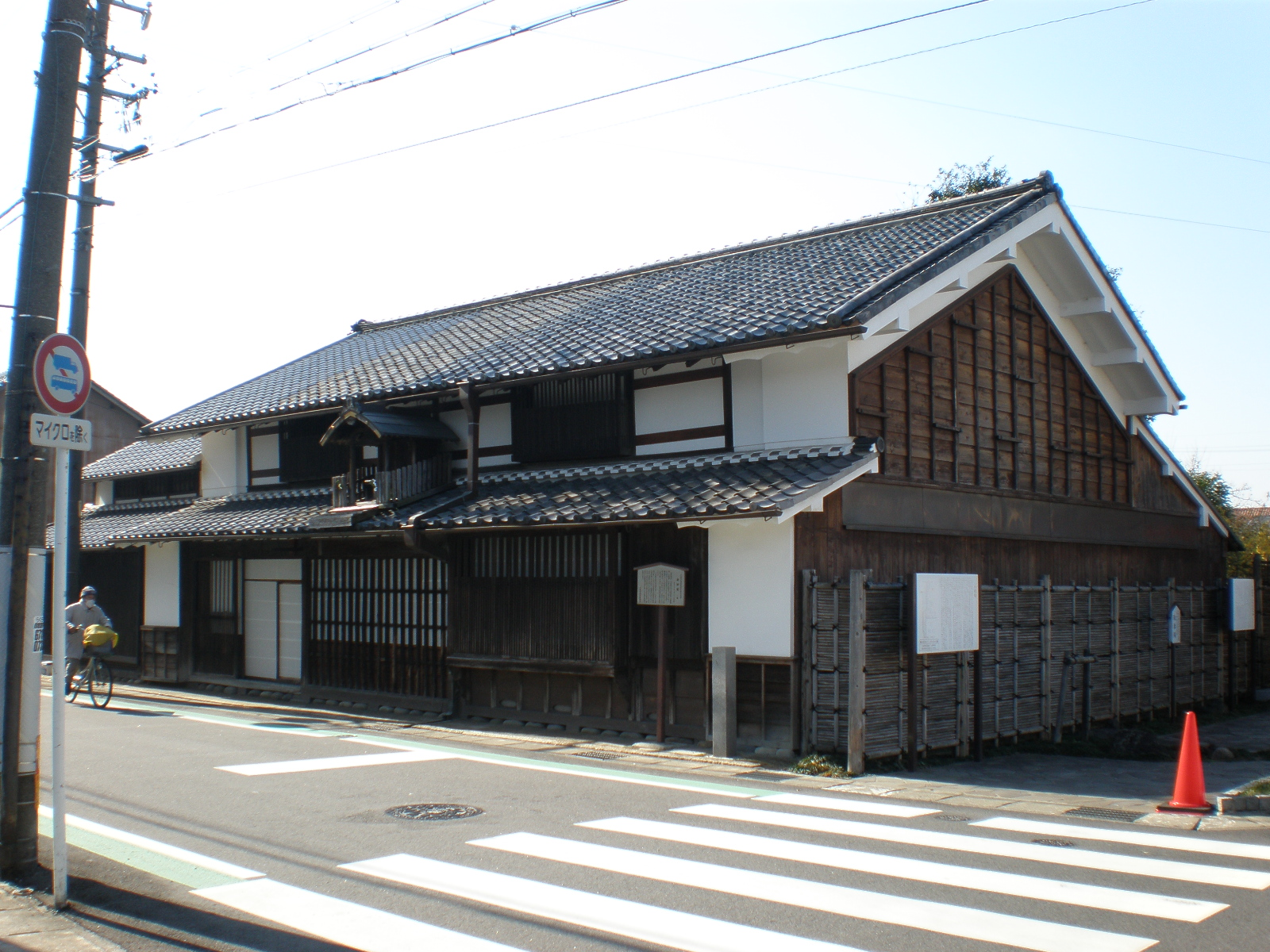
Komaki-shuku

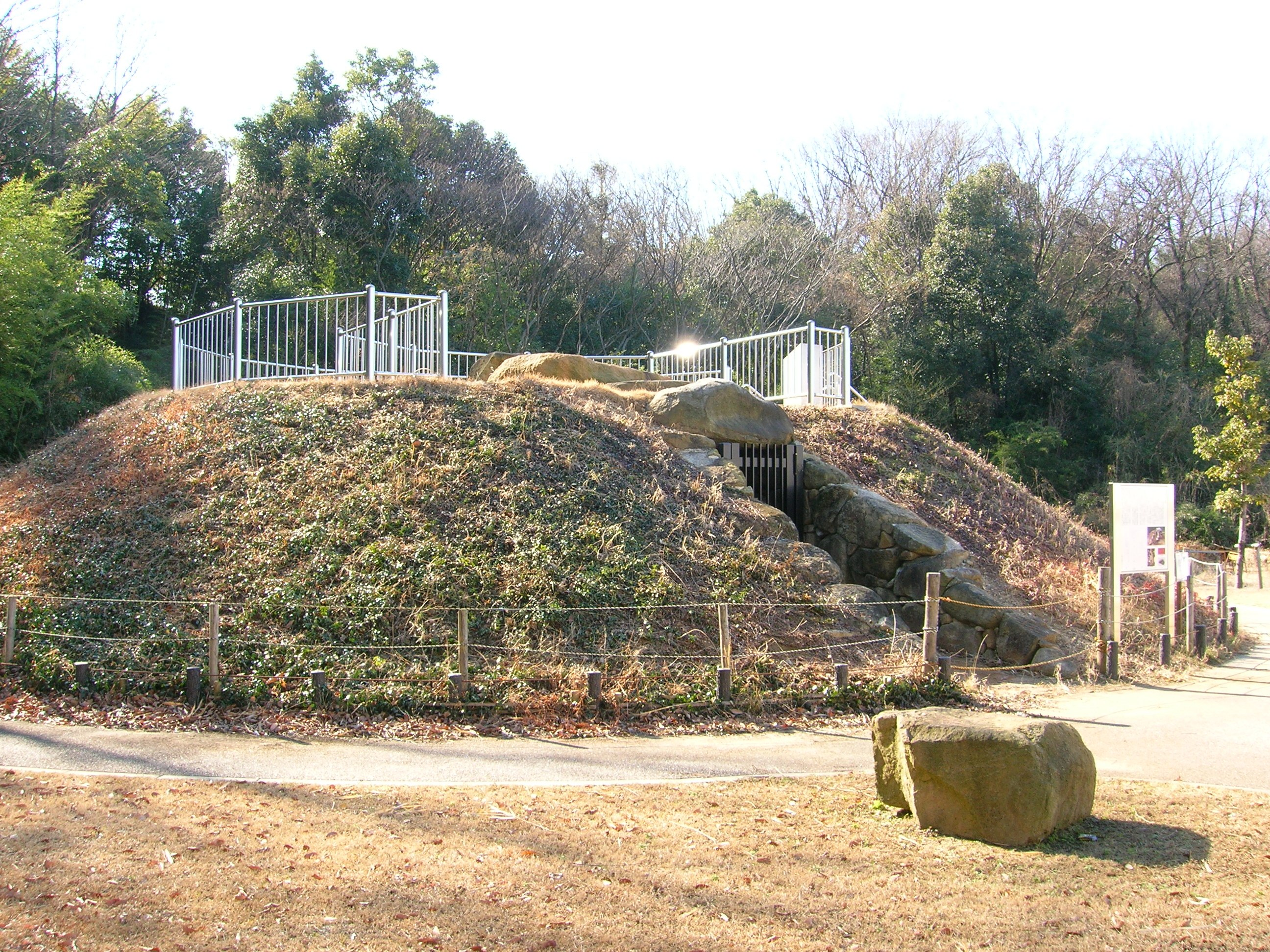
Iwaya Kofun

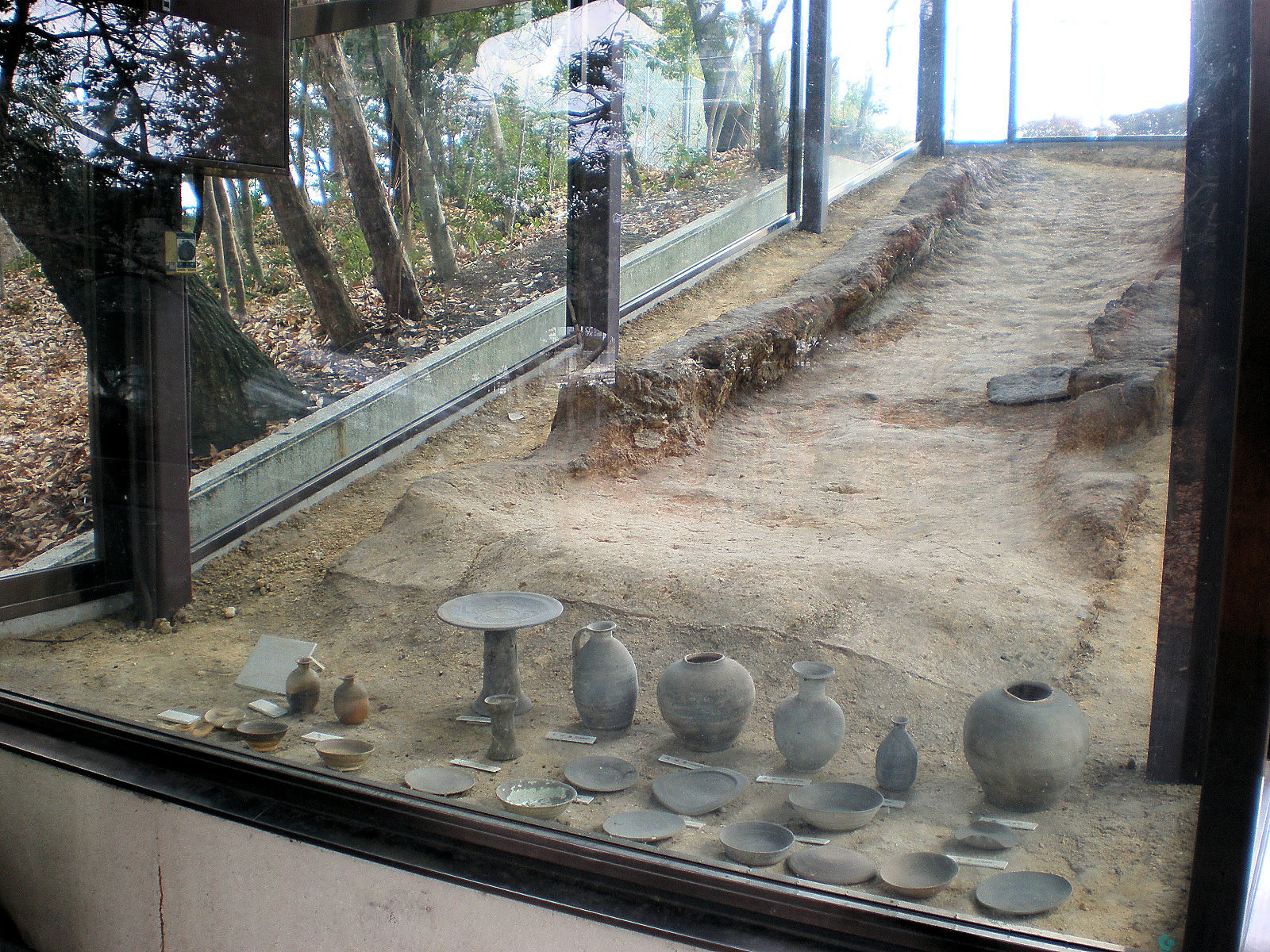
Shinooka kiln ruins

Parks

- Menard Art Museum
- Komaki Municipal Baseball Stadium
- Park Arena Komaki
- Shimin Shiki no Mori
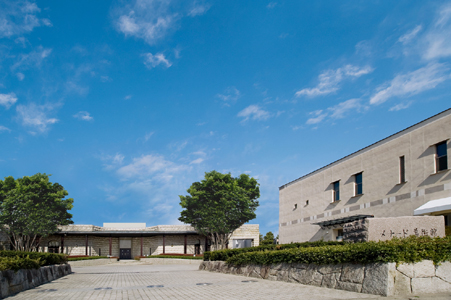
Menard Art Museum

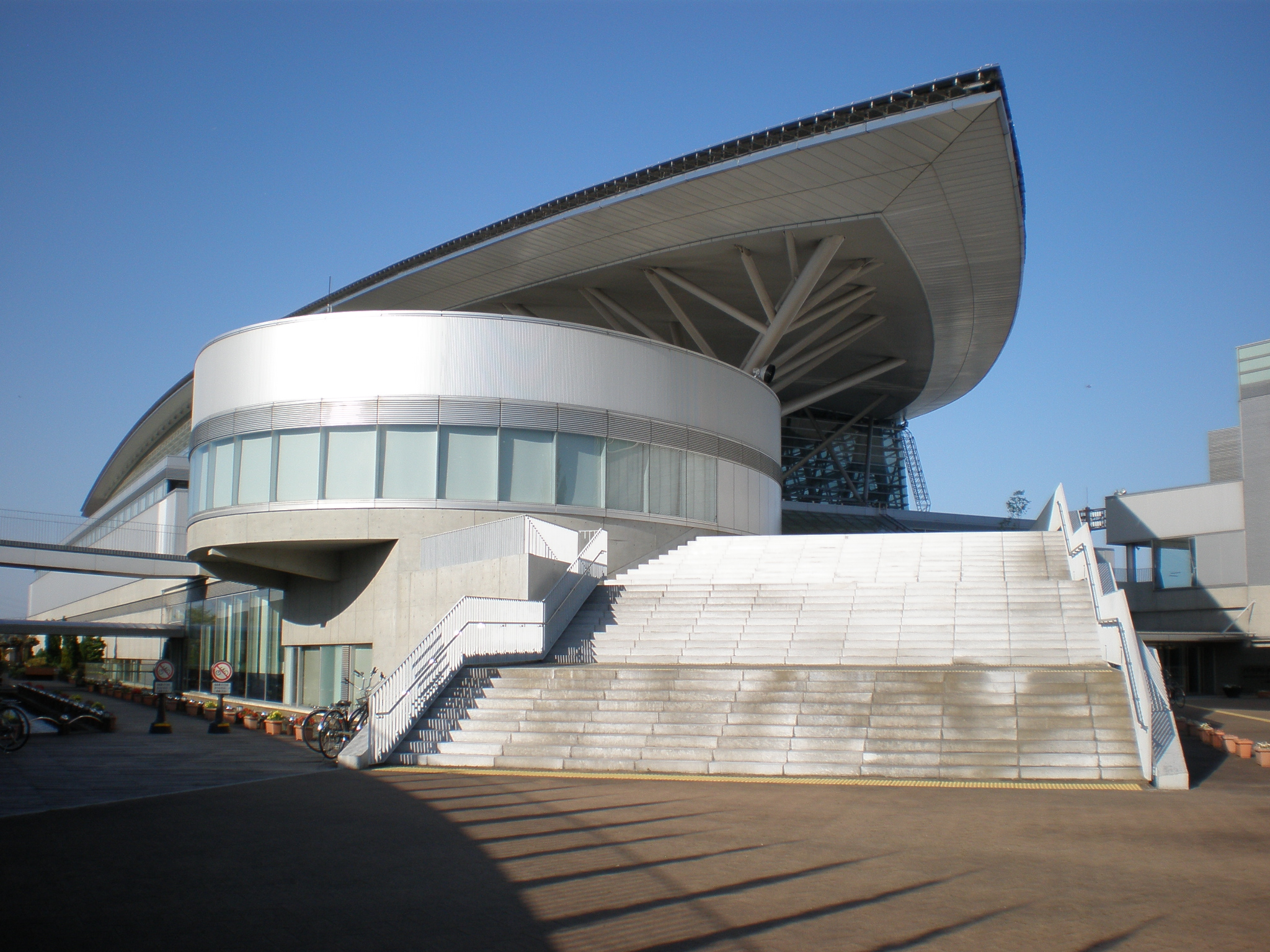
Park Arena Komaki

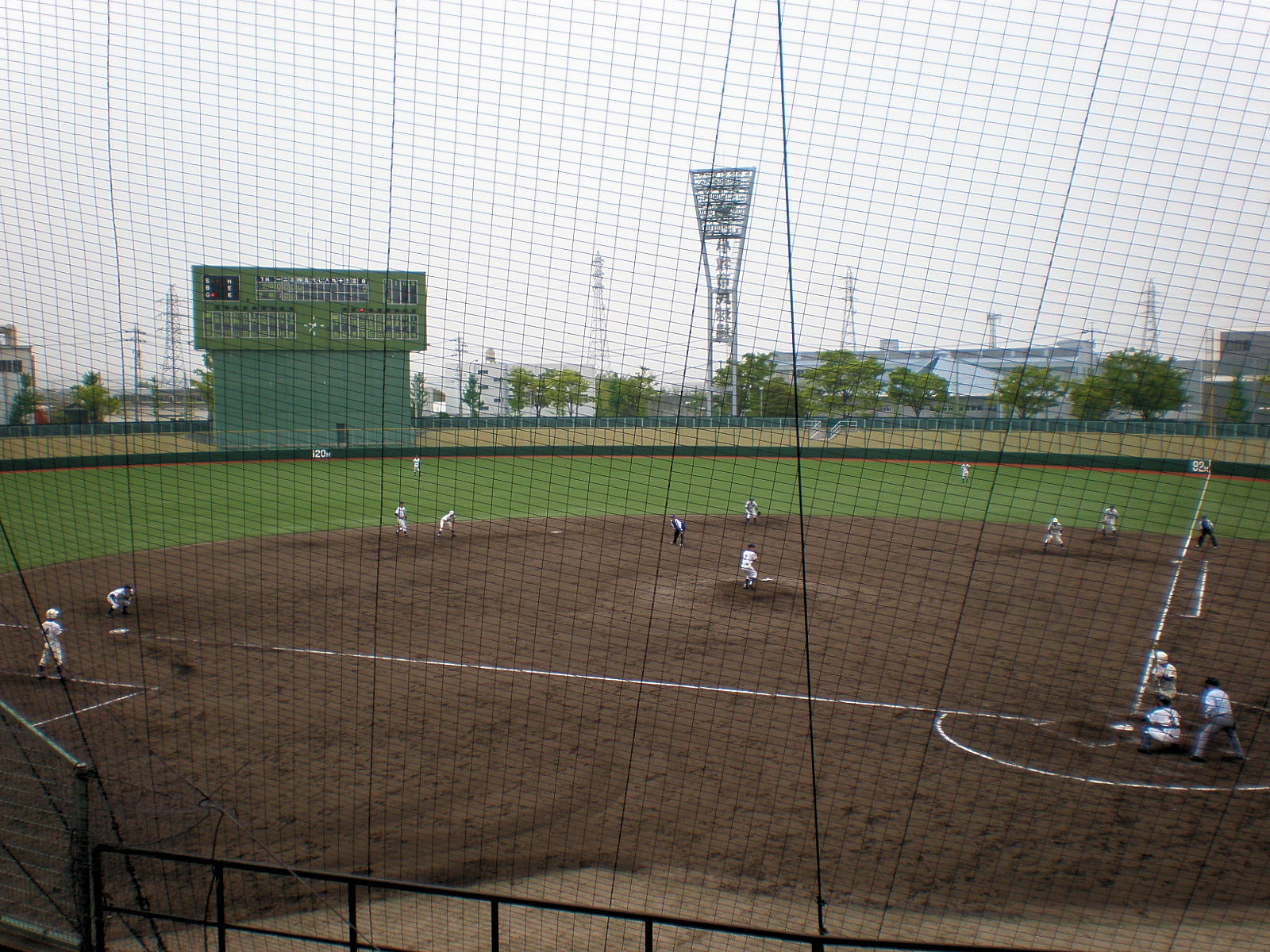
Komaki Municipal Baseball Stadium

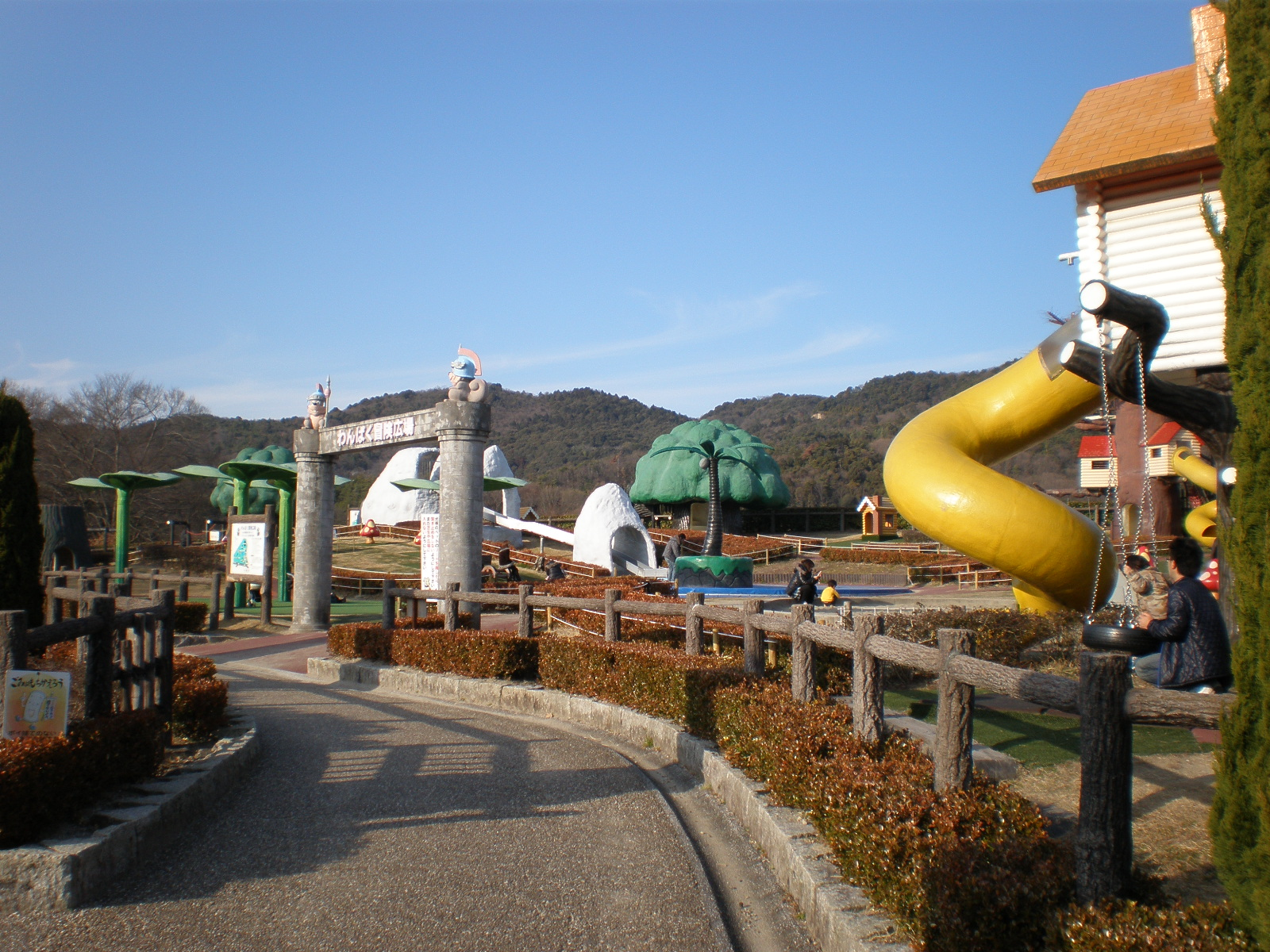
Shimin Shiki no Mori

== Culture ==
=== Festivals ===
- Hōnen Matsuri, and annual fertility festival held on March 15 at Tagata Shrine.
- Bamboo Installation
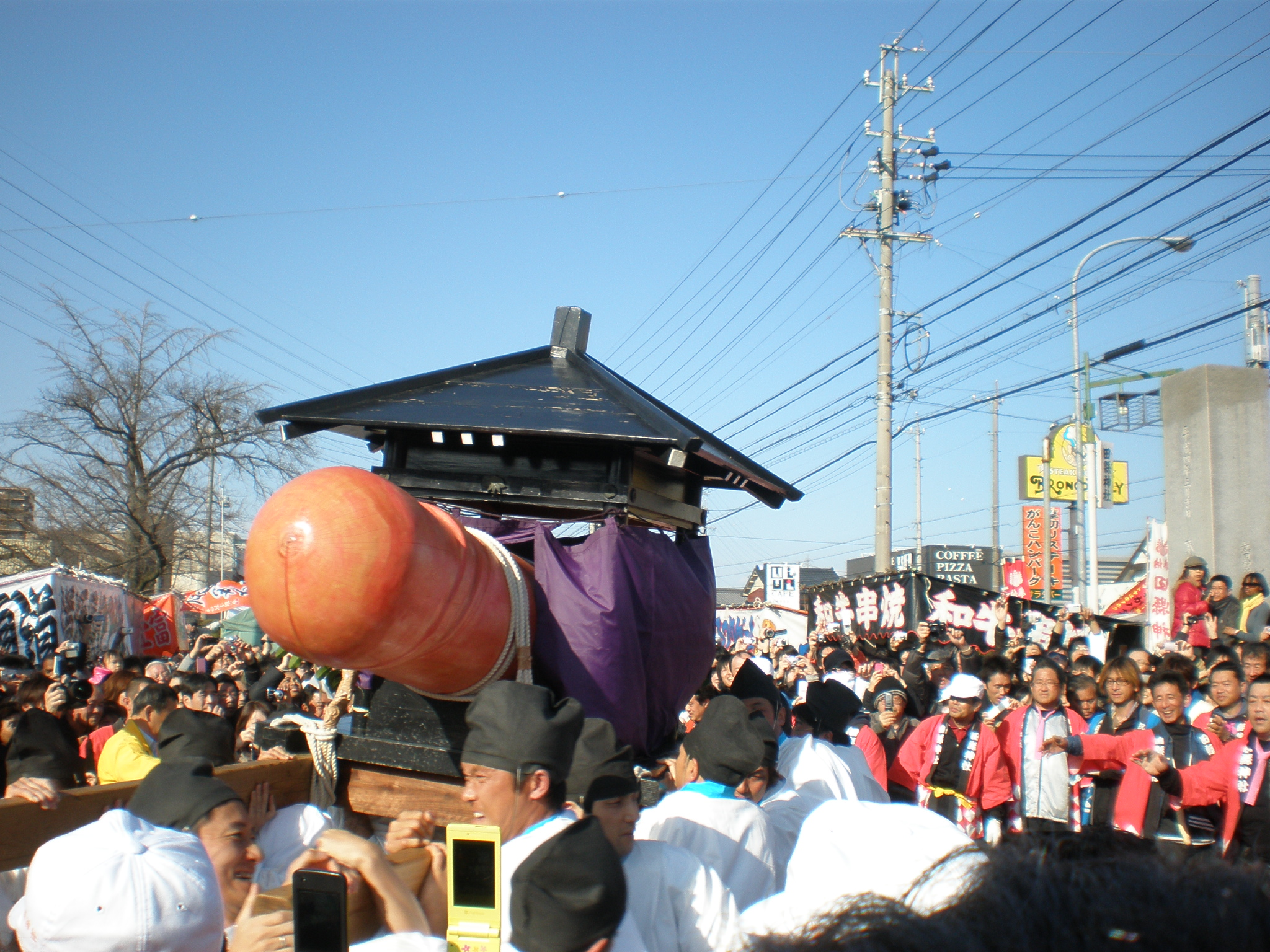
Hōnen Matsuri at Tagata Shrine in Komaki

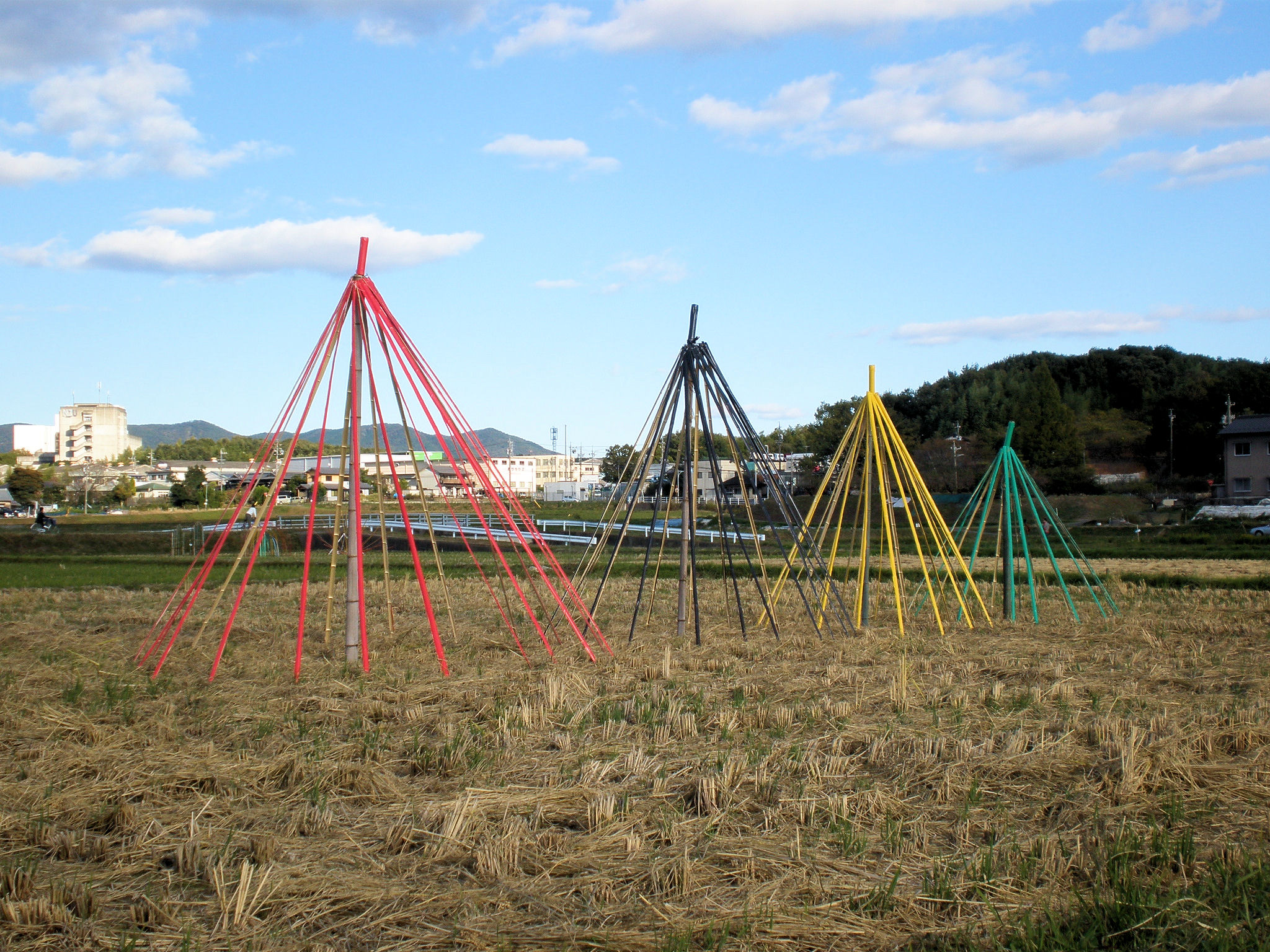
Bamboo Installation

=== Sports ===
Sex	Name	competition	League	Home	Sponsor	Since
Men	Nagoya Diamond Dolphins	Basketball	B.League (B1)	Dolphins Arena; Park Arena Komaki	Nagoya Diamond Dolphins (Mitsubishi Electric)	1950
Men	Nagoya Oceans	Futsal	F.League	Takeda Teva Ocean Arena; Park Arena Komaki	Teva Takeda Pharma	2006

== Noted people from Komaki ==
- AK-69, hip-hop artist
- Kohei Hirate, professional race car driver
- Miku Ishida, singer, gravure artist
- Masanari Omura, professional footballer
- Minoru Tanaka, professional wrestler
- Asuka Teramoto, Olympic gymnast
- Jōtarō Watanabe, Imperial Japanese Army general
