= Mount Komaki =

Mountain in Aichi Prefecture, Japan

- 小牧山
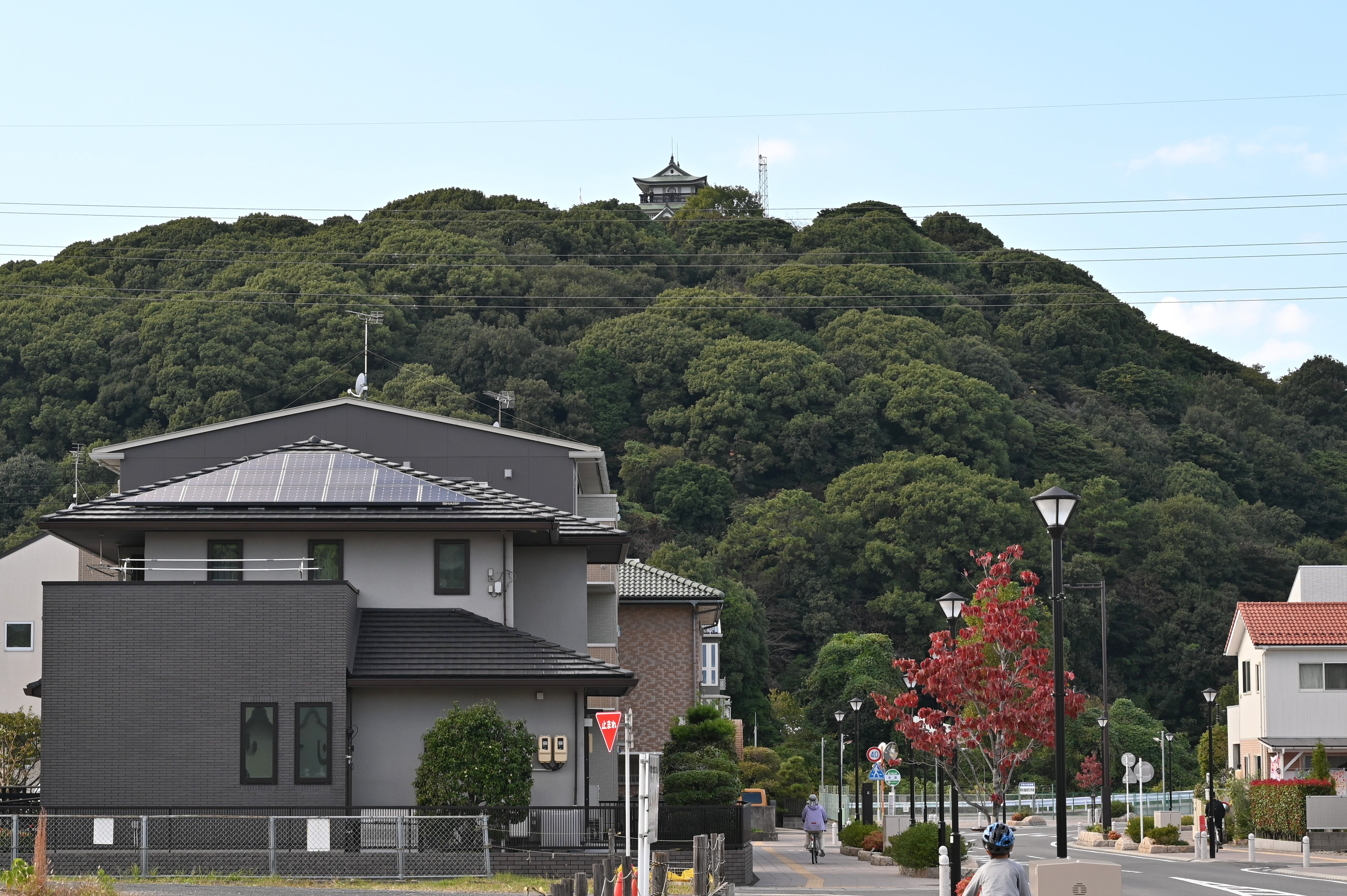
- Mount Komaki

Highest point
- Elevation: 85.9 m (282 ft)

Geography
- Location: Komaki, Aichi, Japan

Climbing
- Easiest route: hiking

Komakiyama Castle
- 小牧山城
- Komaki, Aichi, Japan
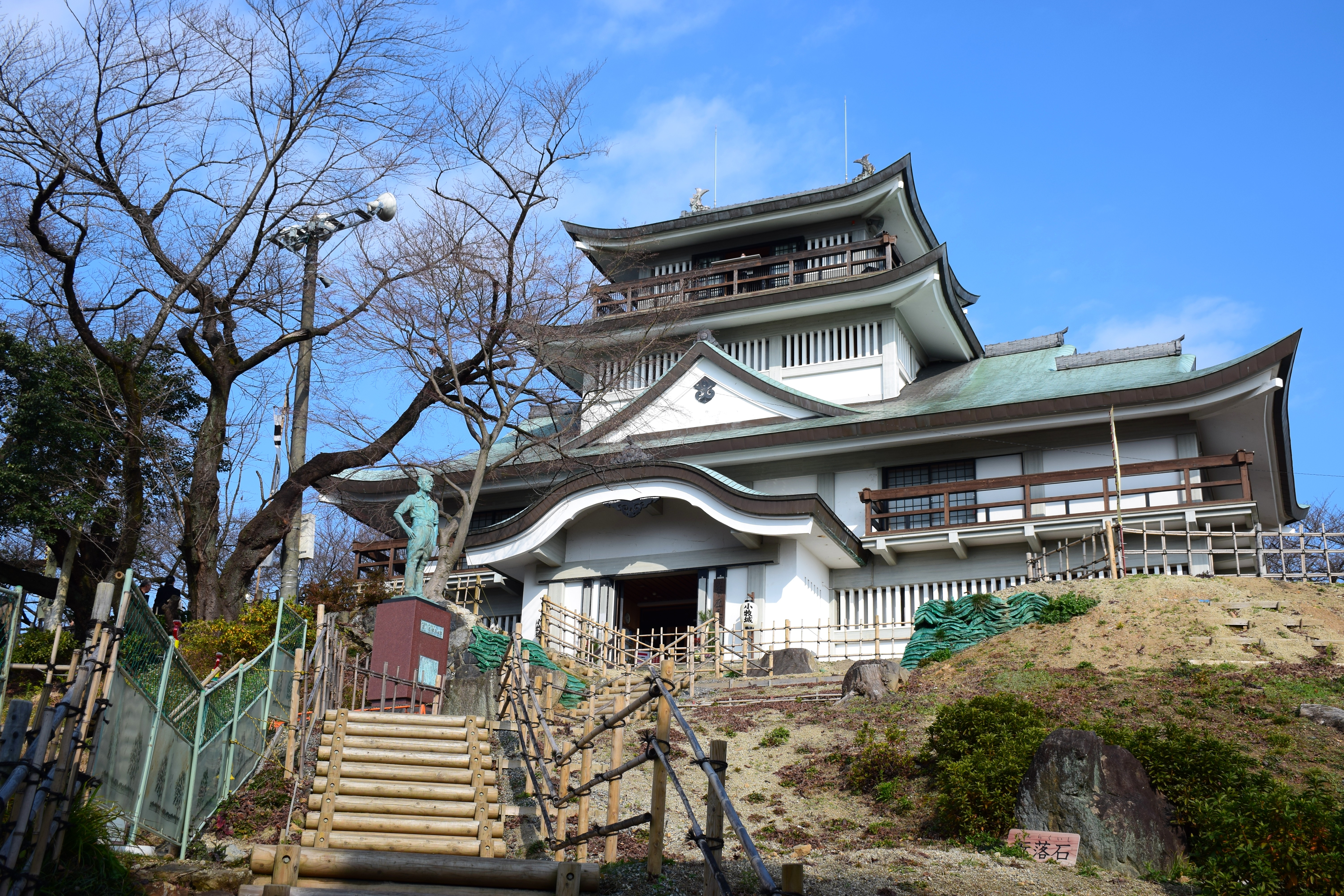
- faux donjon of Komakiyama Castle

Site information
- Type: yamashiro-style Japanese castle
- Controlled by: Oda Nobunaga, Tokugawa Ieyasu
- Condition: Ruins; only earthwork walls and dry moat remain

Location
- Coordinates: 35°17′33″N 136°54′49″E

Site history
- Built: 1563
- Built by: Oda Nobunaga

Mount Komaki (小牧山, Komakiyama) is an 86 m-high (282 ft) mountain located in the city of Komaki, Aichi Prefecture, Japan. At one point, the mountain was topped with the original Komakiyama Castle, built by Oda Nobunaga. Its base stretches for nearly 600 m (1,969 ft) from east to west, and 400 m (1,312 ft) from north to south, covering an area of approximately 21 ha (52 acres). The mountain is now a historical park, containing various castle ruins, including water wells and stone walls, in addition to artifacts dating further back. Though known for the sakura trees, the northern part of the mountain is home to many Machilus thunbergii trees. This is the only spot in the surrounding area where these trees occur naturally. The reproduction of Komakiyama Castle was built in 1967 and houses the Komaki City Historical Museum.

== Komakiyama Castle ==
Komakiyama Castle (小牧山城, Komakiyama-jō) was a Sengoku period yamashiro-style Japanese castle located in what is now part of the city of Komaki, Aichi prefecture. It was built by the warlord Oda Nobunaga to facilitate his conquest of Mino Province, later reused by Tokugawa Ieyasu in his struggle for hegemony over Toyotomi Hideyoshi. Its ruins have been protected as a National Historic Site since 1927.

=== Background ===
Komakiyama Castle is located on Mount Komaki, an isolated 86 m-high (282 ft) high hill in the center of the Nōbi Plain in central Owari Province. The isolation of the location meant that the castle had a good view in all directions. The castle consisted of many terraces on a steep hillside, protected by stone walls and dry moats, with the inner bailey on the summit, crowned by a tenshu.

=== History ===
After Oda Nobunaga defeated Imagawa Yoshimoto at the Battle of Okehazama in 1560, securing his eastern borders, he turned his attention to the conquest of Mino Province to the north. He built a castle on Mount Komaki in 1563 as his base of operations due to its proximity to the middle and eastern areas of Mino. Nobunaga succeeded in securing Mino by 1567 and transferred his seat to Inabayama Castle (the future Gifu Castle) in 1567 and then turned his attention to the conquest of the Kansai region to the west, abandoning Komakiyama Castle.

After Nobunaga's assassination in 1582, conflict arose between his son Oda Nobukatsu and his leading general Toyotomi Hideyoshi. Nobukatsu allied with Tokugawa Ieyasu and seized Owari Province, while Hideyoshi held on to Mino Province. Hideyoshi's general Ikeda Tsuneoki crossed the Kiso River and occupied Inuyama Castle. To counter this move, Tokugawa Ieyasu occupied and expanded the vacant Komakiyama Castle. Both sides clashed in a series of largely inconclusive battles known collectively as the Battle of Komaki and Nagakute. The stalemate ended when Ieyasu decided to submit to Hideyoshi, which resulted in his withdrawal to Mikawa Province, and Komakiyama Castle was once again abandoned.

In the Edo period, Owari Province came back under the control of the Tokugawa clan, and Komakiyama Castle was retained by Owari Domain as a secondary fortification for use in emergencies, as it retained the shape of its original fortifications. By the time of the Meiji restoration, these fortifications were largely in ruins. The site was donated by the Tokugawa family to the local government in 1930 and became a park. A faux tenshu was recreated on the summit in 1967 and renovated in 2006. The building was modeled after the Hiunkaku Pavilion of the temple of Nishi Hongan-ji in Kyoto and is thus not a historically accurate reconstruction. It houses the Komaki City Historical Museum with examples of samurai armor, Japanese swords and early firearms, roof tiles, and other artifacts uncovered during excavations in the castle grounds.

The site is a 20 minutes walk from Meitetsu Komaki Line Komaki Station.

== See also ==
- List of Historic Sites of Japan (Aichi)

== Literature ==
- De Lange, William (2021). An Encyclopedia of Japanese Castles. Groningen: Toyo Press. pp. 600 pages. ISBN 978-9492722300.
- Schmorleitz, Morton S. (1974). Castles in Japan. Tokyo: Charles E. Tuttle Co. pp. 144–145. ISBN 0-8048-1102-4.
- Mitchelhill, Jennifer (2004). Castles of the Samurai: Power and Beauty. Tokyo: Kodansha. p. 112 pages. ISBN 4-7700-2954-3.
- Turnbull, Stephen (2003). Japanese Castles 1540-1640. Osprey Publishing. p. 64 pages. ISBN 1-84176-429-9.
- Motoo, Hinago (1986). Japanese Castles. Tokyo: Kodansha. p. 200 pages. ISBN 0-87011-766-1.
