= Kasugai Station (Meitetsu) =

Railway station in Kasugai, Aichi Prefecture, Japan

Kasugai Station 春日井駅

- Kasugai Station in August 2026

General information
- Location: 34-3 Doai Kasugaicho, Kasugai-shi, Aichi-ken 486-0963; Japan
- Coordinates: 35.2504°N 136.936°E
- Operator: Meitetsu
- Line: ■ Meitetsu Komaki Line
- Distance: 5.4 kilometers from Kamiiida
- Platforms: 1 island platform

Other information
- Status: Unstaffed
- Station code: KM10
- Website: Official website

History
- Opened: February 11, 1931

Passengers
- FY2017: 3140

Services
Preceding station	Meitetsu	Following station
Ushiyama towards Inuyama	Komaki Line	Ajiyoshi towards Kamiiida
Location
- Location within Aichi Prefecture Location within Japan

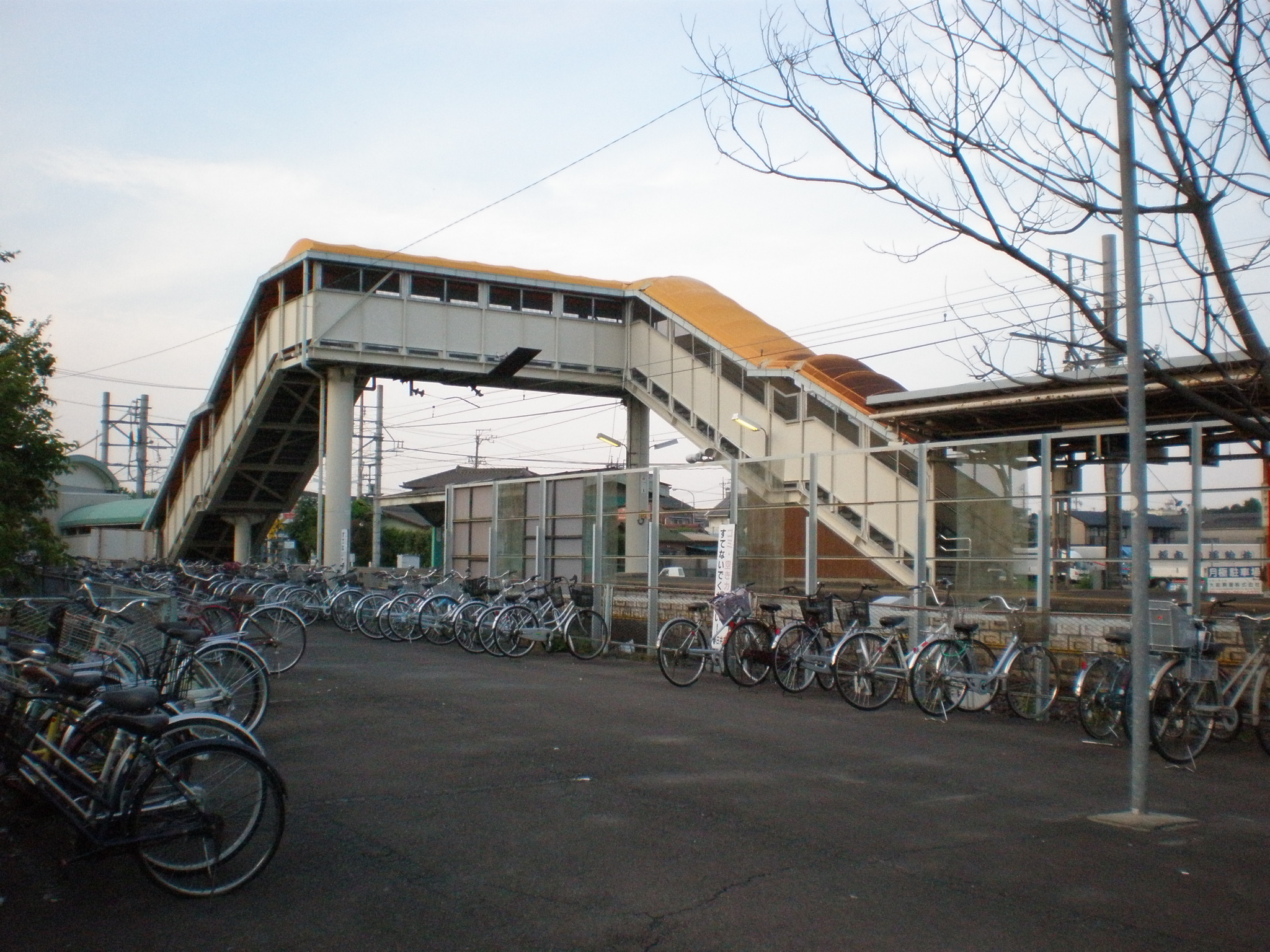
Footbridge

Kasugai Station (春日井駅, Kasugai-eki) is a railway station in the city of Kasugai, Aichi Prefecture, Japan, operated by Meitetsu.

== Lines ==
Kasugai Station is served by the Meitetsu Komaki Line, and is located 5.4 kilometers from the starting point of the line at Kamiiida.

== Station layout ==
The station has one island platforms connected to the station building by a footbridge. The platform is short and can accommodate trains with four carriages or shorter. The station has automated ticket machines, Manaca automated turnstiles and is unattended.

=== Platforms ===
1	■ Komaki Line	For Komaki and Inuyama
2	■ Komaki Line	For Heian-dōri

== Station history ==
Kasugai Station was opened on February 11, 1931.

== Passenger statistics ==
In fiscal 2017, the station was used by an average of 3140 passengers daily.

== Surrounding area ==
- Kasugai Elementary School
- former Kiso-kaidō

== See also ==
- List of railway stations in Japan
