= Manai Station =

Railway station in Kasugai, Aichi Prefecture, Japan

Manai Station 間内駅

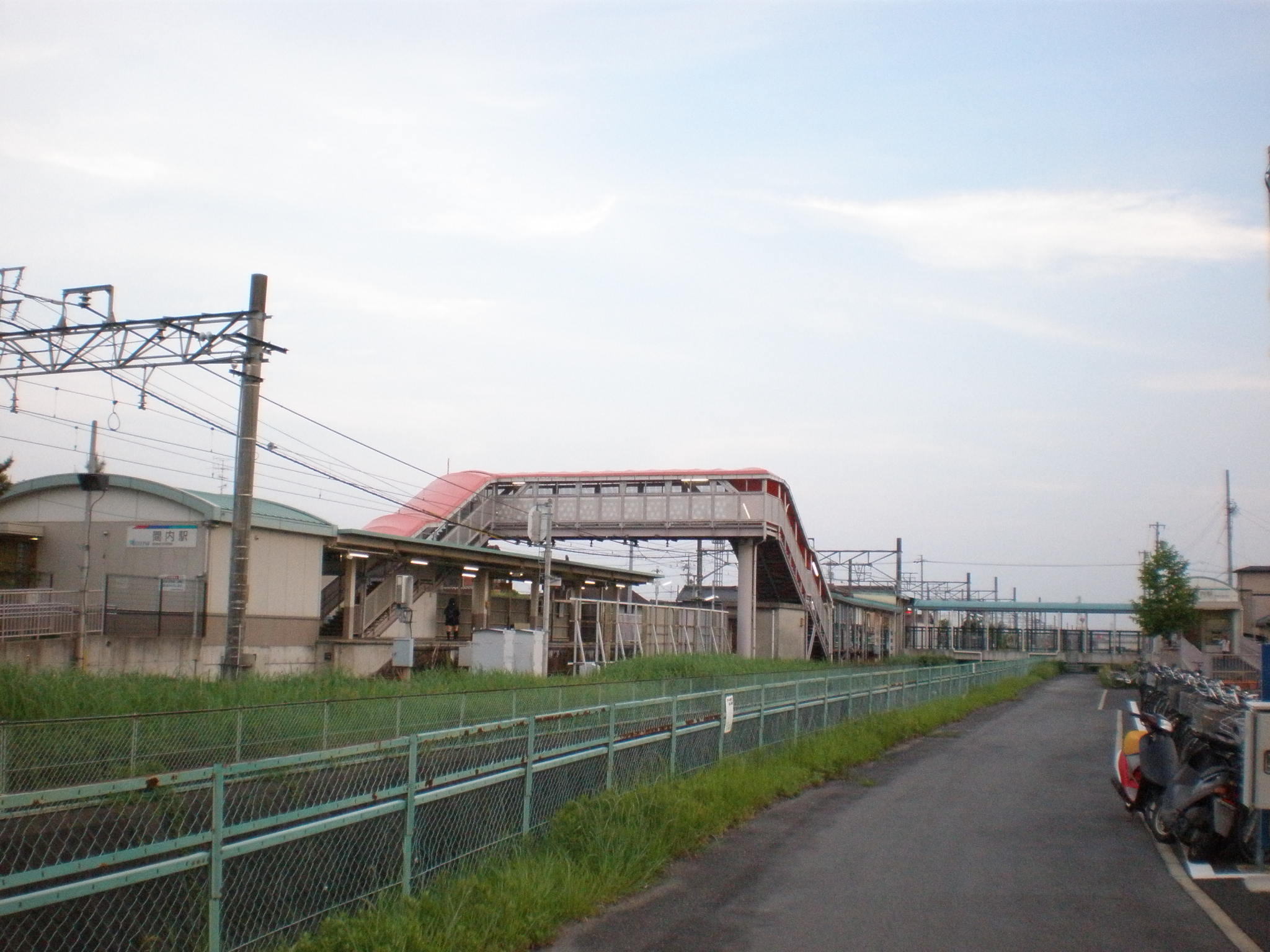
- Manai Station in May 2009

General information
- Location: 281-3 Ushiyamacho, Kasugai-shi, Aichi-ken 486-0901; Japan
- Coordinates: 35.2716°N 136.9314°E
- Operator: Meitetsu
- Line: ■ Meitetsu Komaki Line
- Distance: 7.8 kilometers from Kamiiida
- Platforms: 2 side platforms

Other information
- Status: Unstaffed
- Station code: KM08
- Website: Official website

History
- Opened: February 11, 1931

Passengers
- FY2015: 2617

Services
Preceding station	Meitetsu	Following station
Komakiguchi towards Inuyama	Komaki Line	Ushiyama towards Kamiiida
Location
- Location within Aichi Prefecture Location within Japan

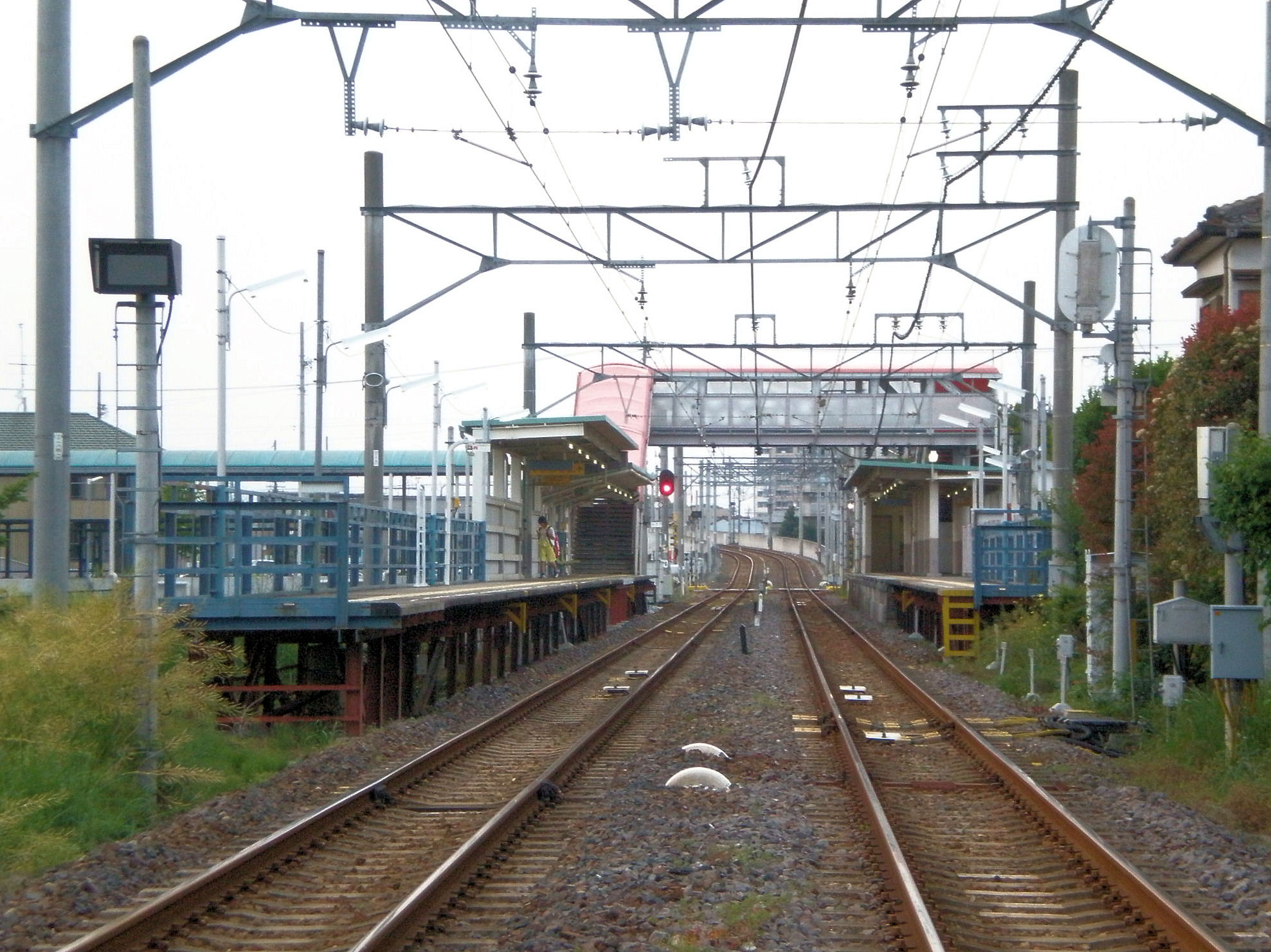
Platforms

Manai Station (間内駅, Manai-eki) is a railway station in the city of Kasugai, Aichi Prefecture, Japan, operated by Meitetsu.

== Lines ==
Manai Station is served by the Meitetsu Komaki Line, and is located 7.8 kilometers from the starting point of the line at Kamiiida.

== Station layout ==
The station has two opposed side platforms connected by a footbridge. The station has automated ticket machines, Manaca automated turnstiles and is unattended..

=== Platforms ===
1	■ Komaki Line	For Komaki and Inuyama
2	■ Komaki Line	For Heian-dōri

== Station history ==
Manai Station was opened on February 11, 1931. The station was closed in 1944 and reopened on November 24, 1947.

== Passenger statistics ==
In fiscal 2017, the station was used by an average of 2617 passengers daily.

== Surrounding area ==
- Myoraku-ji
- Hachiman Jinja
- Myozo-ji

== See also ==
- List of railway stations in Japan
