= Ushiyama Station =

Railway station in Kasugai, Aichi Prefecture, Japan

Ushiyama Station 牛山駅

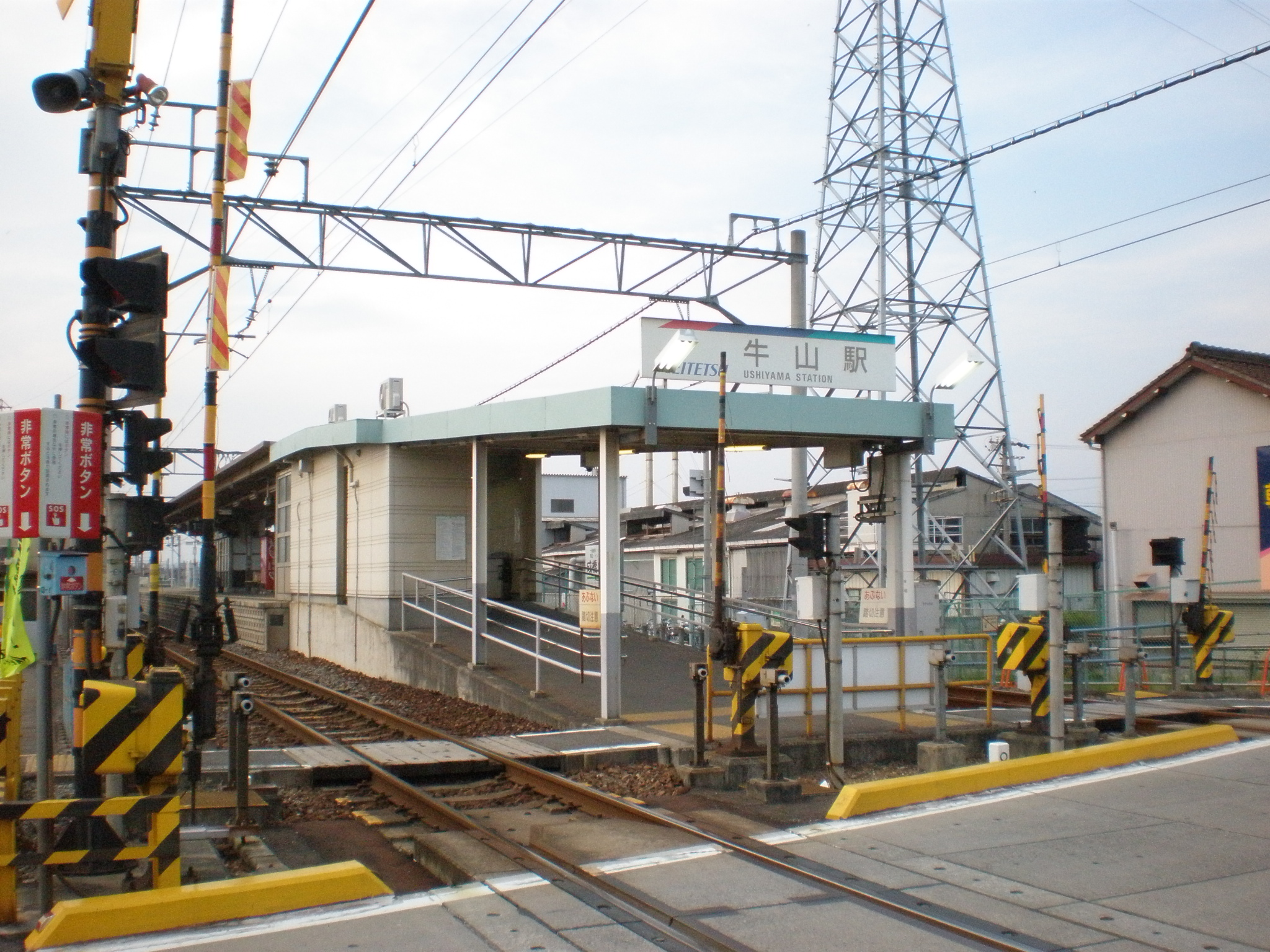
- Ushiyama Station in May 2009

General information
- Location: 951 Ushiyama-cho, Kasugai-shi, Aichi-ken 486-0901; Japan
- Coordinates: 35.2639°N 136.9315°E
- Operator: Meitetsu
- Line: ■ Meitetsu Komaki Line
- Distance: 6.9 kilometers from Kamiiida
- Platforms: 1 island platform

Other information
- Status: Unstaffed
- Station code: KM09
- Website: Official website

History
- Opened: February 11, 1931

Passengers
- FY2015: 2441

Services
Preceding station	Meitetsu	Following station
Manai towards Inuyama	Komaki Line	Kasugai towards Kamiiida
Location
- Location within Aichi Prefecture Location within Japan

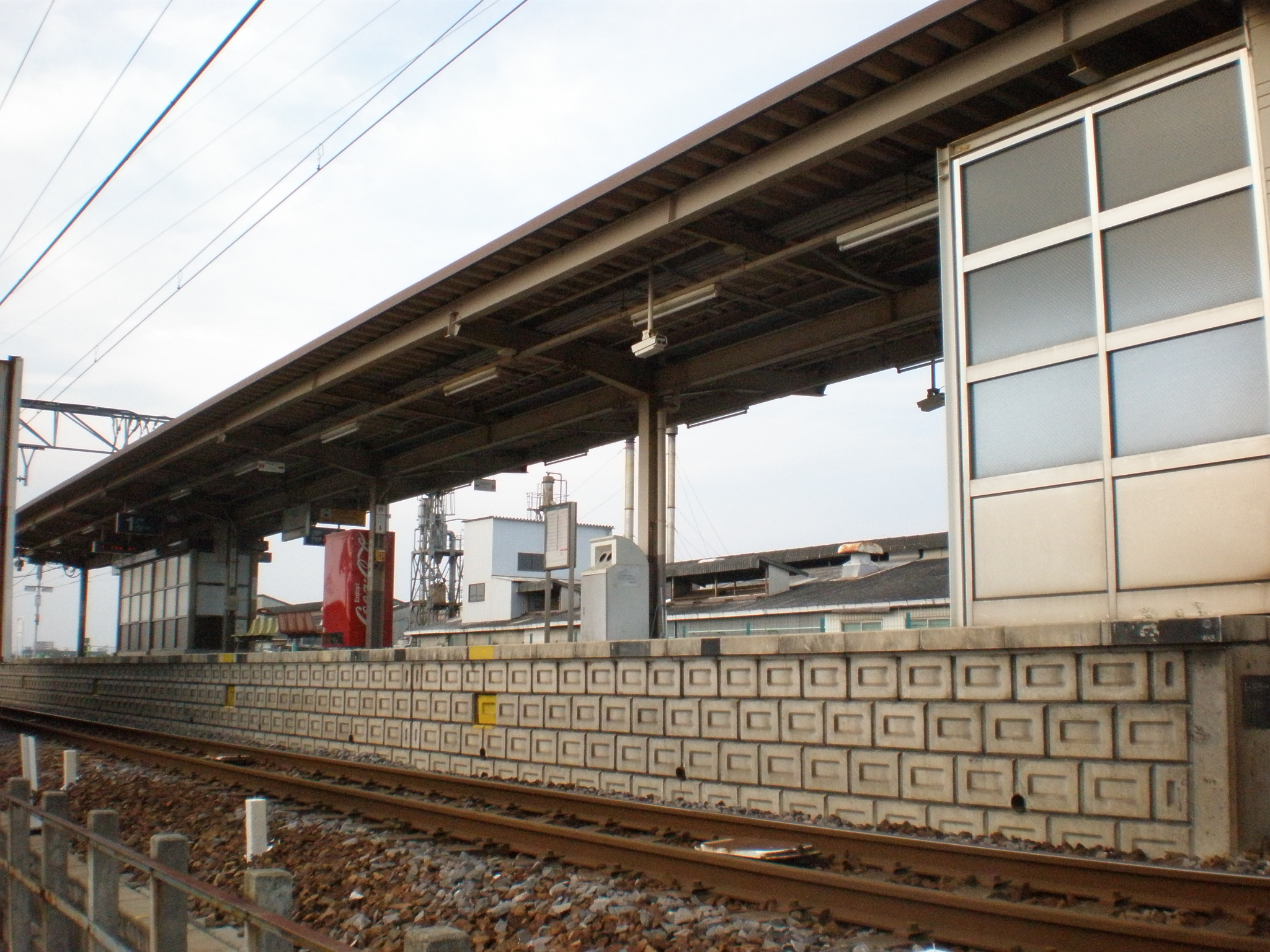
Platform

Ushiyama Station (牛山駅, Ushiyama-eki) is a railway station in the city of Kasugai, Aichi Prefecture, Japan, operated by Meitetsu.

== Lines ==
Ushiyama Station is served by the Meitetsu Komaki Line, and is located 6.9 kilometers from the starting point of the line at Kamiiida.

== Station layout ==
The station has one island platform connected to the station building by a level crossing. The station has automated ticket machines, Manaca automated turnstiles and is unattended.

=== Platforms ===
1	■ Komaki Line	For Komaki and Inuyama
2	■ Komaki Line	For Heian-dōri

== Station history ==
Ushiyama Station was opened on February 11, 1931.

== Passenger statistics ==
In fiscal 2017, the station was used by an average of 2441 passengers daily.

== Surrounding area ==
- JASDF Komaki Air Base is within a five-minute walking distance to the main gate of Komaki Air Base operated by Japan Air Self-Defense Force. The train station and the base are located on the east side of Nagoya Airfield.

== See also ==
- List of railway stations in Japan
