= Gakuden Station (Aichi) =

Railway station in Inuyama, Aichi Prefecture, Japan

Gakuden Station 楽田駅

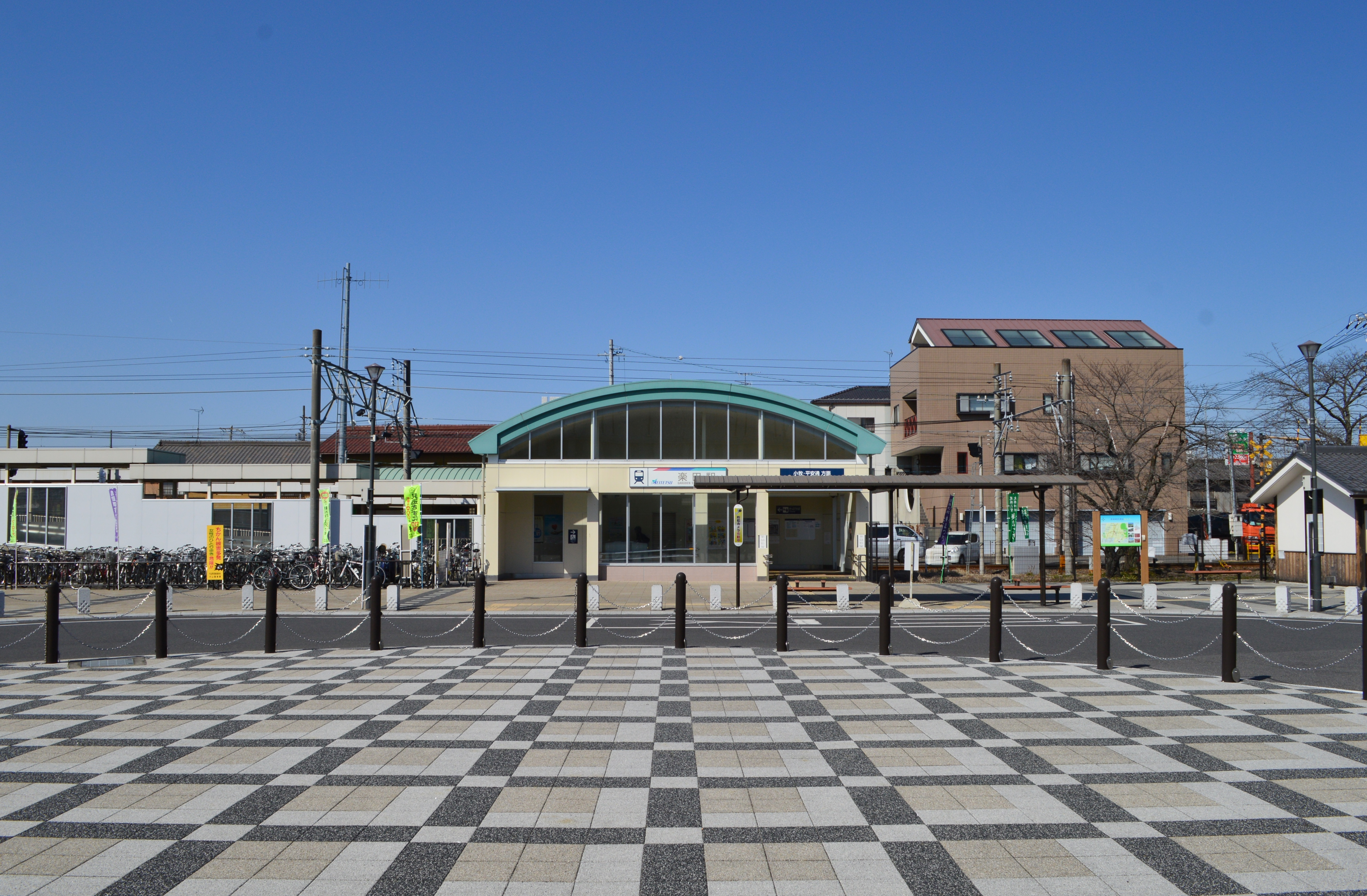
- Gakuden Station in February 2018

General information
- Location: 126-2 Wakamiya, Inuyama-shi, Aichi-ken 484-0861; Japan
- Coordinates: 35.3304°N 136.9500°E
- Operator: Meitetsu
- Line: ■ Meitetsu Komaki Line
- Distance: 14.9 kilometers from Kamiiida
- Platforms: 2 side platforms

Other information
- Status: Unstaffed
- Station code: KM02
- Website: Official website

History
- Opened: April 29, 1931

Passengers
- FY2015: 3317

Services
Preceding station	Meitetsu	Following station
Haguro towards Inuyama	Komaki Line	Tagata-jinja-mae towards Kamiiida
Location
- Location within Aichi Prefecture Location within Japan

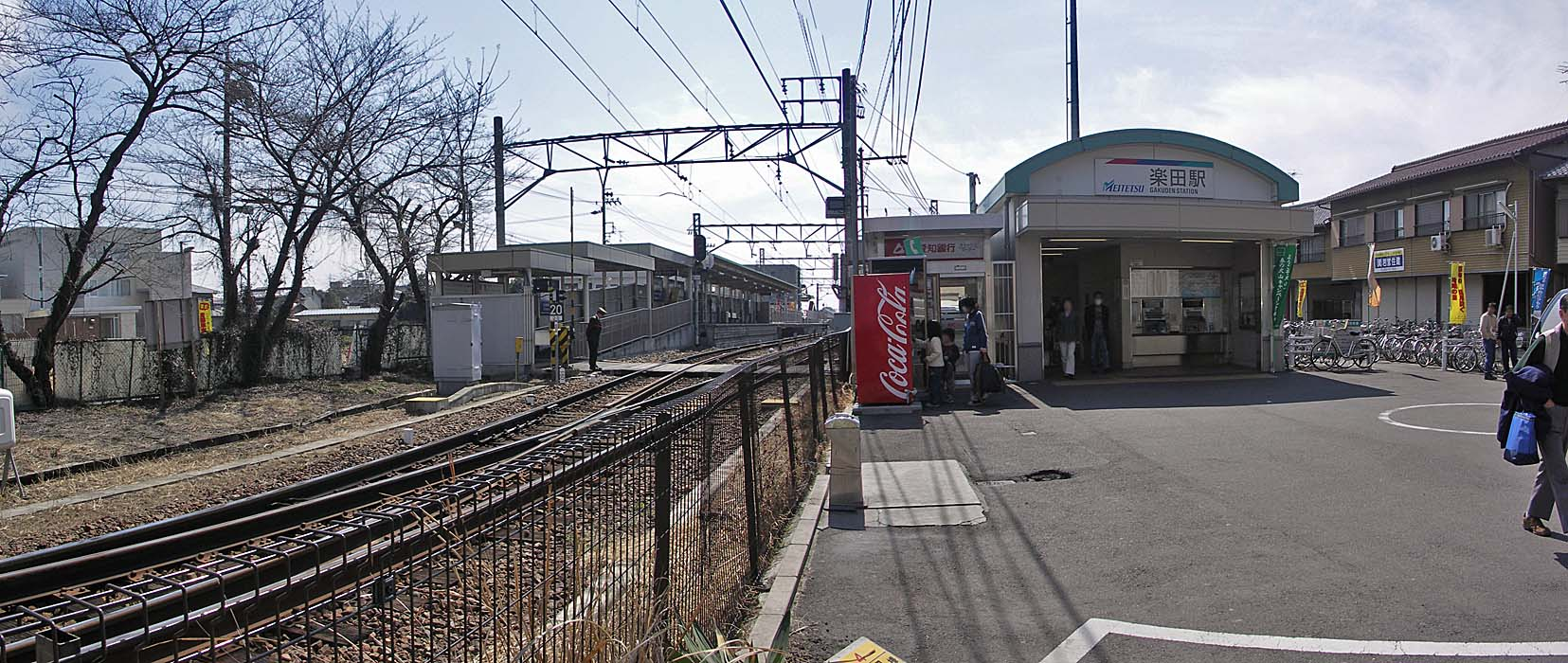
Panorama view

Gakuden Station (楽田駅, Gakuden-eki) is a railway station in the city of Inuyama, Aichi Prefecture, Japan, operated by Meitetsu.

== Lines ==
Gakuden Station is served by the Meitetsu Komaki Line, and is located 14.9 kilometers from the starting point of the line at Kamiiida.

== Station layout ==
The station has two opposed side platforms connected by a level crossing. The station has automated ticket machines, Manaca automated turnstiles and is unattended.

=== Platforms ===
1	■ Komaki Line	For Inuyama
2	■ Komaki Line	For Komaki and Heian-dōri

== Station history ==
Gakuden Station was opened on April 29, 1931.

== Passenger statistics ==
In fiscal 2015, the station was used by an average of 3317 passengers daily.

== Surrounding area ==
- ruins of Gakuden Castle

== See also ==
- List of railway stations in Japan
