= Tagata Jinja-mae Station =

Railway station in Komaki, Aichi Prefecture, Japan

Tagata Jinja-mae Station 田県神社前駅

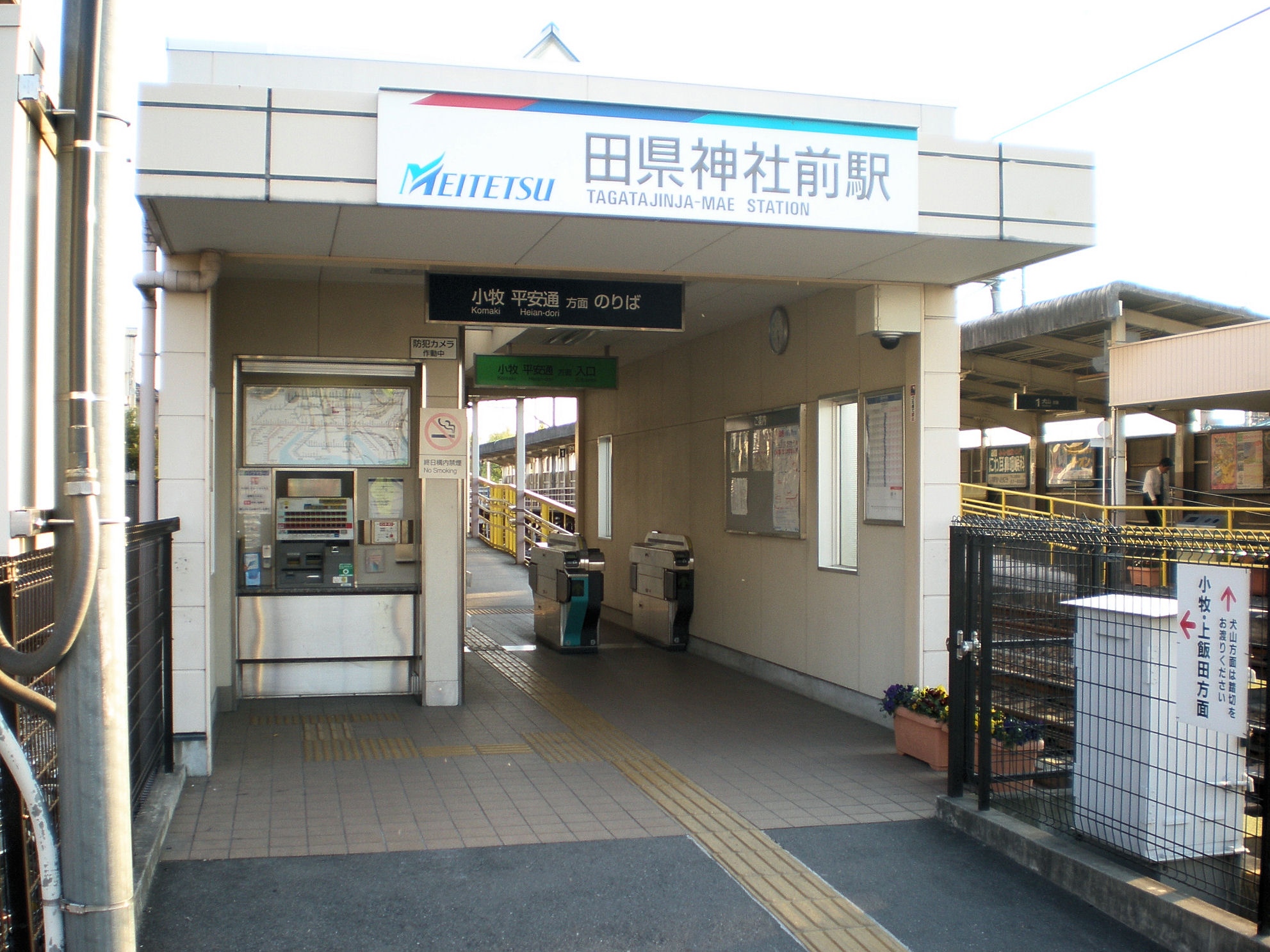
- Tagata Jinja-mae Station in April 2009

General information
- Location: Kubo Isshiki 1052-2, Komaki-shi, Aichi-ken 485-0003; Japan
- Coordinates: 35.3176°N 136.9435°E
- Operator: Meitetsu
- Line: ■ Meitetsu Komaki Line
- Distance: 13.3 kilometers from Kamiiida
- Platforms: 2 side platforms

Other information
- Status: Unstaffed
- Station code: KM03
- Website: Official website

History
- Opened: April 29, 1931
- Former names: Kuboisshiki (to 1965)

Passengers
- FY2017: 4665

Services
Preceding station	Meitetsu	Following station
Gakuden towards Inuyama	Komaki Line	Ajioka towards Kamiiida
Location
- Location within Aichi Prefecture Location within Japan

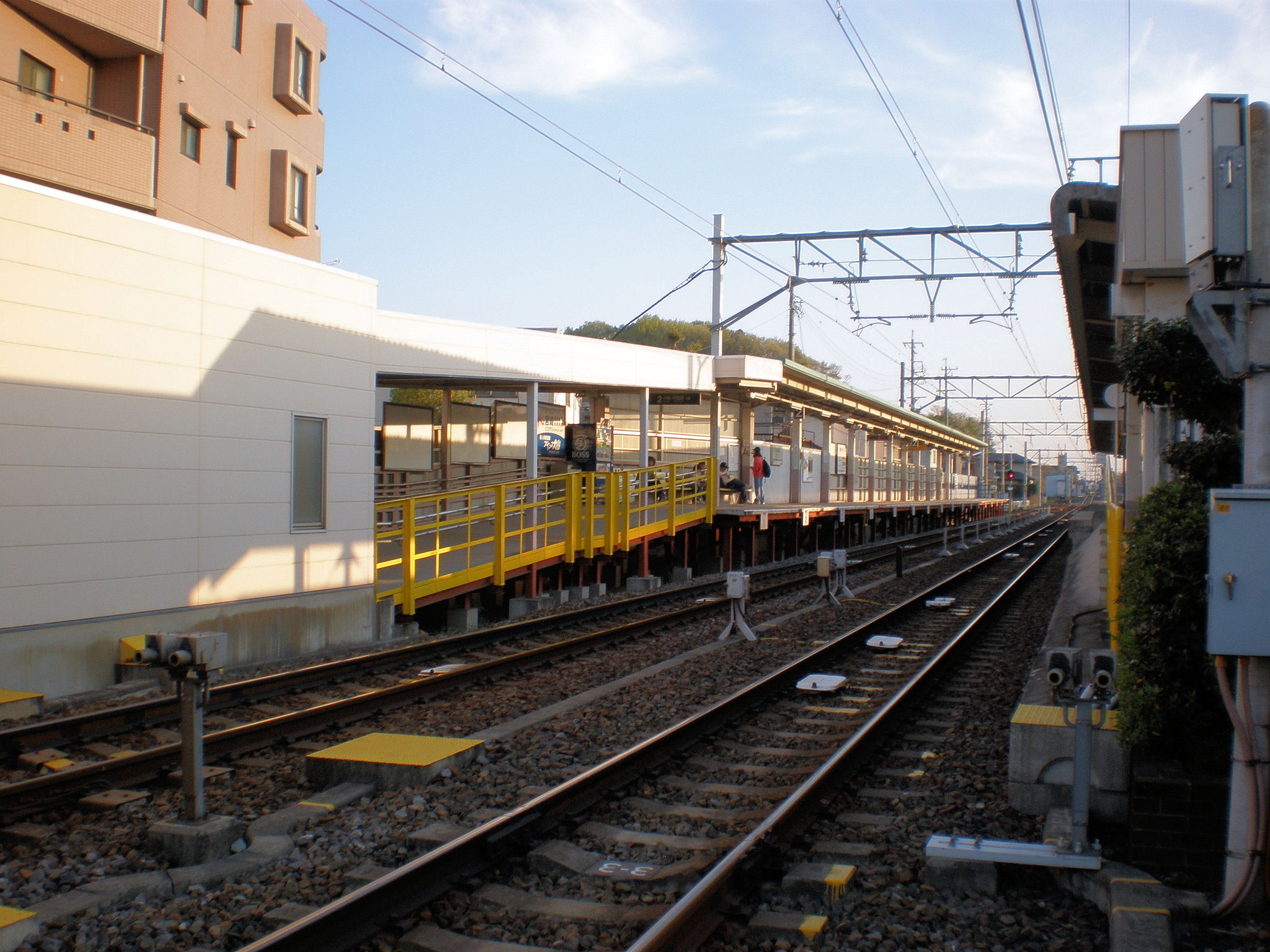
Platform

Tagata Jinja-mae Station (田県神社前駅, Tagata Jinja-mae-eki) is a railway station in the city of Komaki, Aichi Prefecture, Japan, operated by Meitetsu.

== Lines ==
Tagata Jinja-mae Station is served by the Meitetsu Komaki Line, and is located 13.3 kilometers from the starting point of the line at Kamiiida.

== Station layout ==
The station has two opposed side platforms connected to the station building by a footbridge. The station has automated ticket machines, Manaca automated turnstiles and is unattended..

=== Platforms ===
1	■ Komaki Line	For Inuyama
2	■ Komaki Line	For Komaki and Heian-dōri

== Station history ==
Tagata-jinja-mae Station was opened on April 29, 1931 as Kuboisshiki Station (久保一色駅, Kuboisshiki-eki). It was closed in 1944, and reopened on March 10, 1965 under its present name. The platforms were rebuilt in March 2002.

== Passenger statistics ==
In fiscal 2017, the station was used by an average of 4665 passengers daily.

== Surrounding area ==
- Tagata Shrine
- Nagoya Keizai University

== See also ==
- List of railway stations in Japan
- Hōnen Matsuri
