= Ajima Station =

Railway station in Nagoya, Japan

Ajima Station 味鋺駅

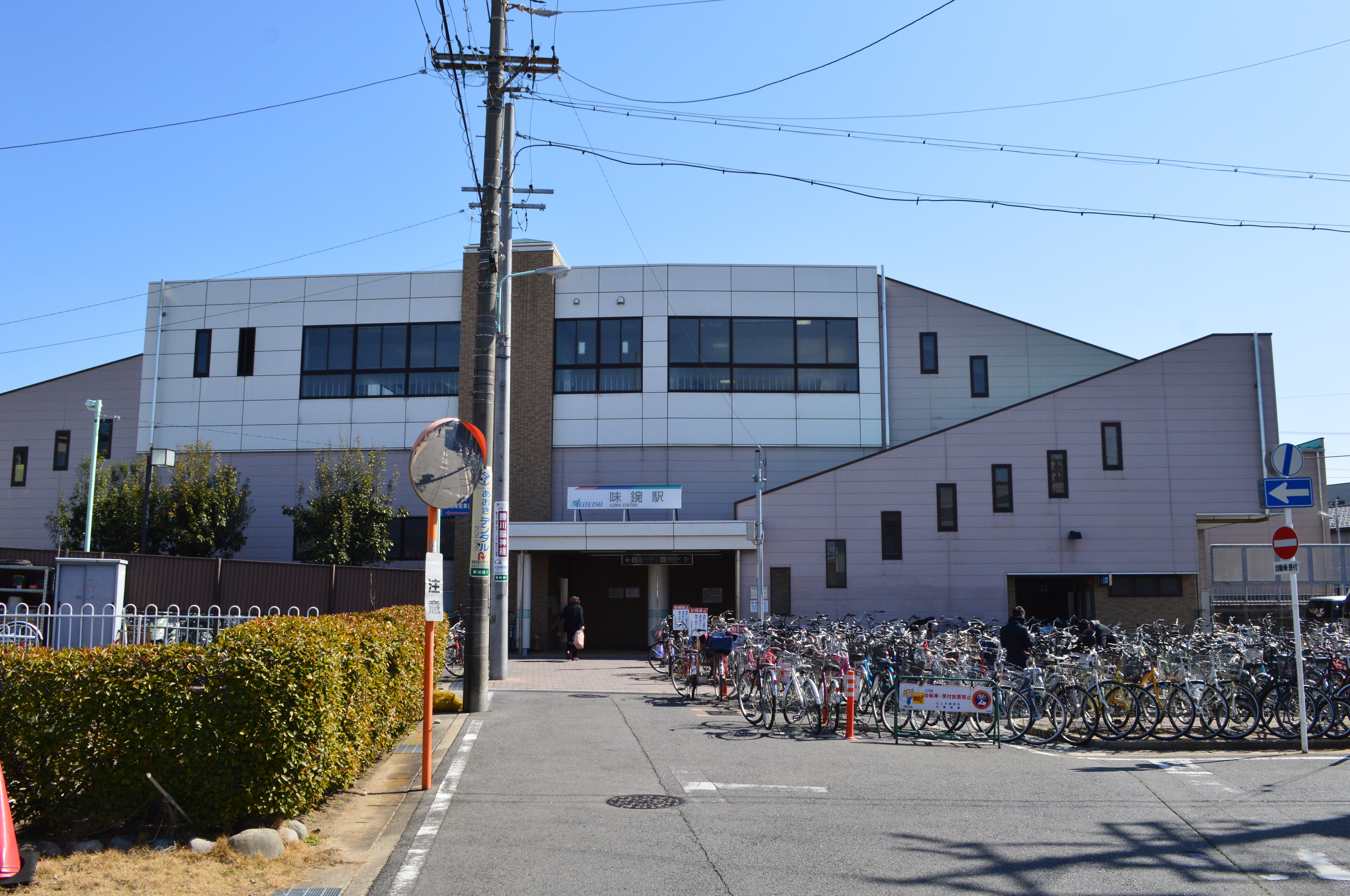
- Ajima Station, February 2018

General information
- Location: 2-123 Higashiajima, Kita-ku, Nagoya-shi, Aichi-ken 462-0013; Japan
- Coordinates: 35.2223°N 136.9362°E
- Operator: Meitetsu
- Line: ■ Meitetsu Komaki Line
- Distance: 2.3 kilometers from Kamiiida
- Platforms: 2 side platforms

Other information
- Status: Unstaffed
- Station code: KM12
- Website: Official website

History
- Opened: February 11, 1931

Passengers
- FY2017: 4417

Services
Preceding station	Meitetsu	Following station
Ajiyoshi towards Inuyama	Komaki Line	Kamiiida Terminus
Location
- Location within Aichi Prefecture Location within Japan

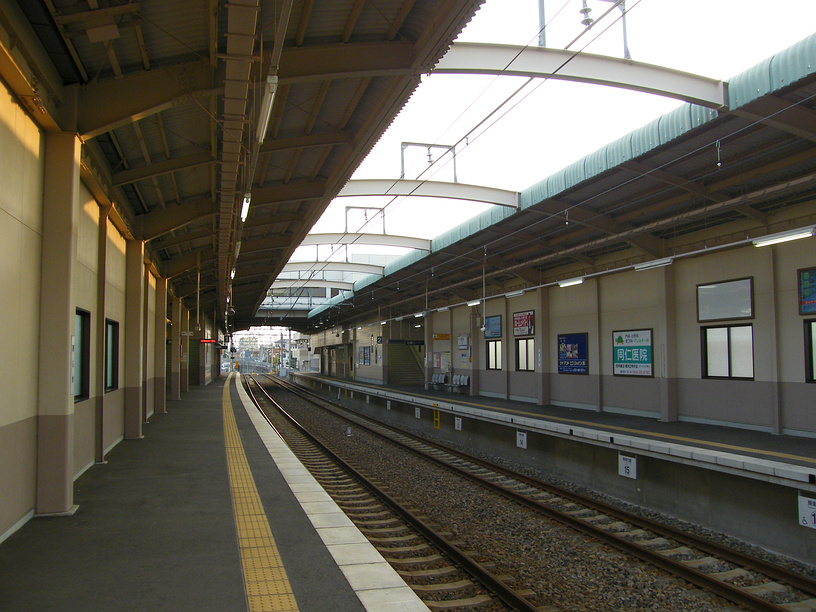
Platform

Ajima Station (味鋺駅, Ajima-eki) is a train station in Kita-ku, Nagoya, Aichi Prefecture, Japan, operated by Meitetsu.

== Lines ==
Ajima Station is served by the Meitetsu Komaki Line, and is located 2.3 kilometers from the starting point of the line at Kamiiida.

== Station layout ==
The station has two opposed side platforms with an elevated station building. The station has automated ticket machines, Manaca automated turnstiles and is unattended..

=== Platforms ===
1	■ Komaki Line	For Komaki and Inuyama
2	■ Komaki Line	For Heian-dōri

== Station history ==
Ajima Station was opened on February 11, 1931.

== Passenger statistics ==
In fiscal 2017, the station was used by an average of 4417 passengers daily.

== Surrounding area ==
- Futagoyama kofun

== See also ==
- List of railway stations in Japan
