= Ajiyoshi Station (Meitetsu) =

Railway station in Kasugai, Aichi Prefecture, Japan

Ajiyoshi Station 味美駅

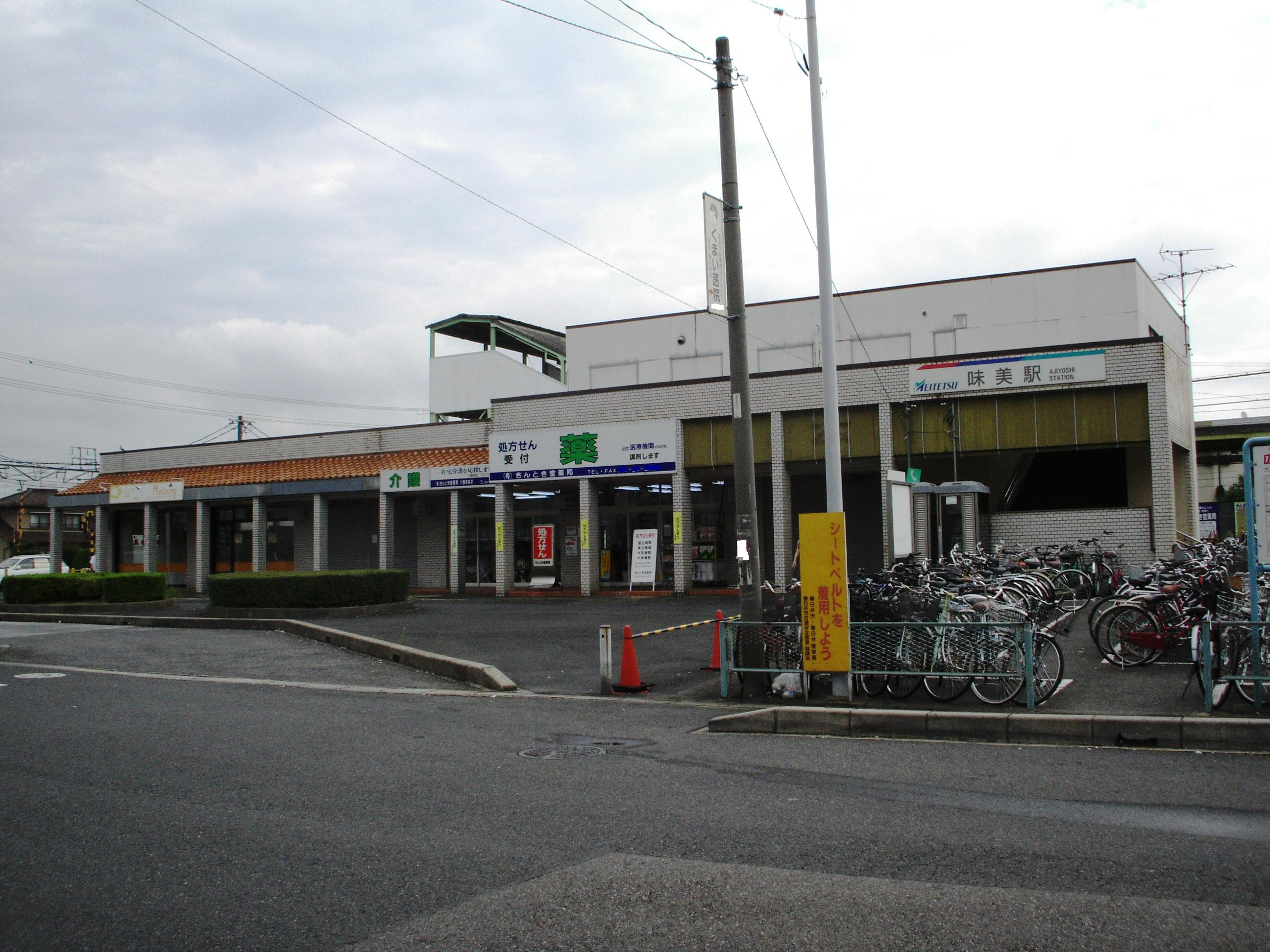
- Ajiyoshi Station in September, 2007

General information
- Location: 1-16-1 Nishihonmachi, Kasugai-shi, Aichi-ken 486-0958; Japan
- Coordinates: 35°14′6.78″N 136°56′13.62″E
- Operator: Meitetsu
- Line: ■ Meitetsu Komaki Line
- Distance: 3.7 kilometers from Kamiiida
- Platforms: 1 island platform

Other information
- Status: Unstaffed
- Station code: KM11
- Website: Official website

History
- Opened: February 11, 1931

Passengers
- FY2017: 4894

Services
Preceding station	Meitetsu	Following station
Kasugai towards Inuyama	Komaki Line	Ajima towards Kamiiida
Location
- Location within Aichi Prefecture Location within Japan

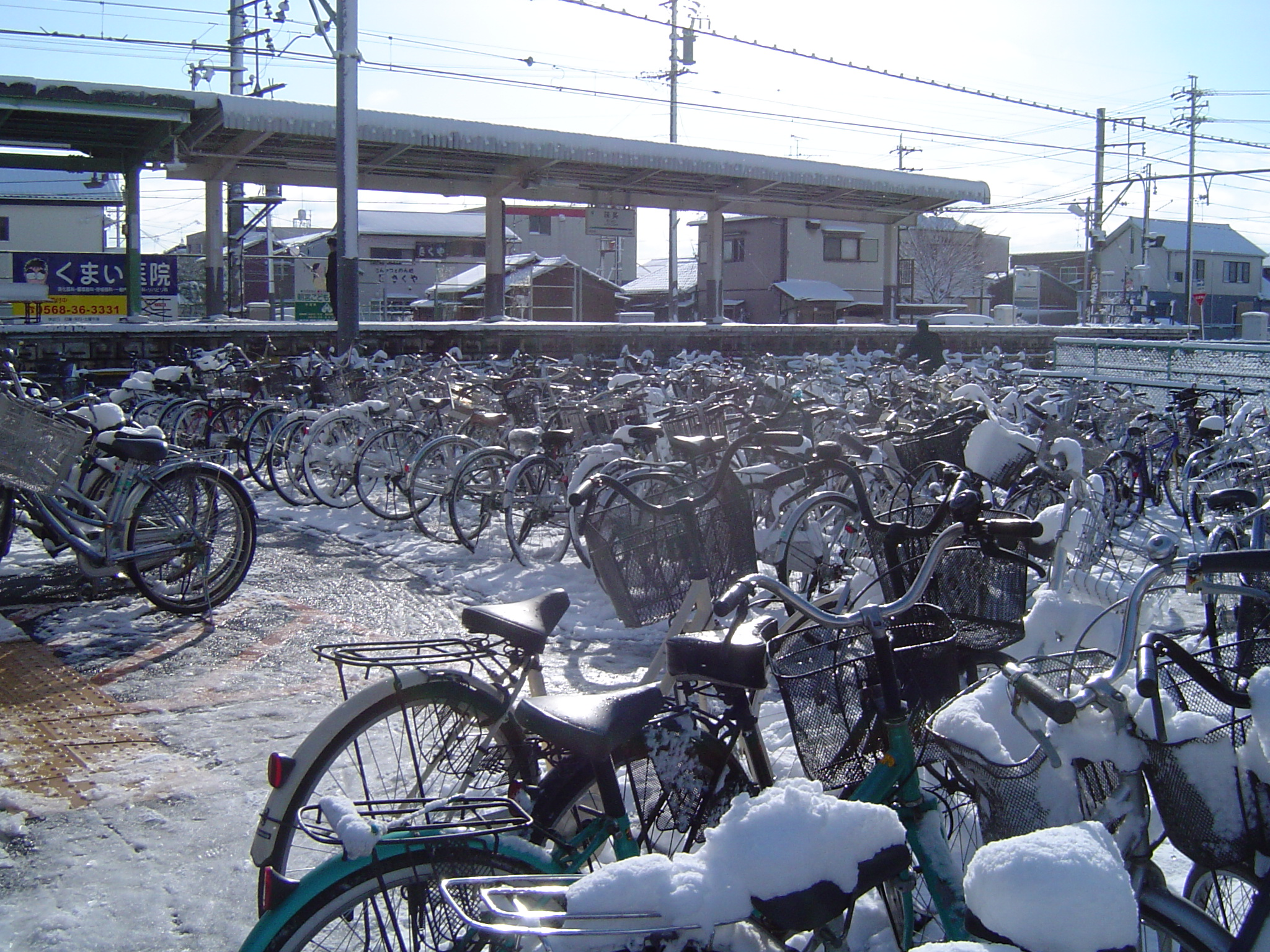
The bicycle lot of Ajiyoshi Station in winter

Ajiyoshi Station (味美駅, Ajiyoshi-eki) is a railway station in the city of Kasugai, Aichi Prefecture, Japan, operated by Meitetsu. It is close to Ajiyoshi Station of the same name, but which is on the Jōhoku Line, operated by a different company, the JR-Central Transport Service Company.

== Lines ==
Ajiyoshi Station is served by the Meitetsu Komaki Line, and is located 3.7 kilometers from the starting point of the line at Kamiiida.

== Station layout ==
The station has one island platform connected to the station building by a footbridge. The station has automated ticket machines, Manaca automated turnstiles and is unattended..

=== Platforms ===
1	■ Komaki Line	For Komaki and Inuyama
2	■ Komaki Line	For Heian-dōri

== Station history ==
Ajiyoshi Station was opened on February 11, 1931.

== Passenger statistics ==
In fiscal 2017, the station was used by an average of 4894 passengers daily.

== Surrounding area ==
- Chita Junior High School
- Ajiyoshi Junior High School
- Ajiyoshi Elementary School

== See also ==
- List of railway stations in Japan
