= Komakiguchi Station =

Railway station in Komaki, Aichi Prefecture, Japan

Komakiguchi Station 小牧口駅

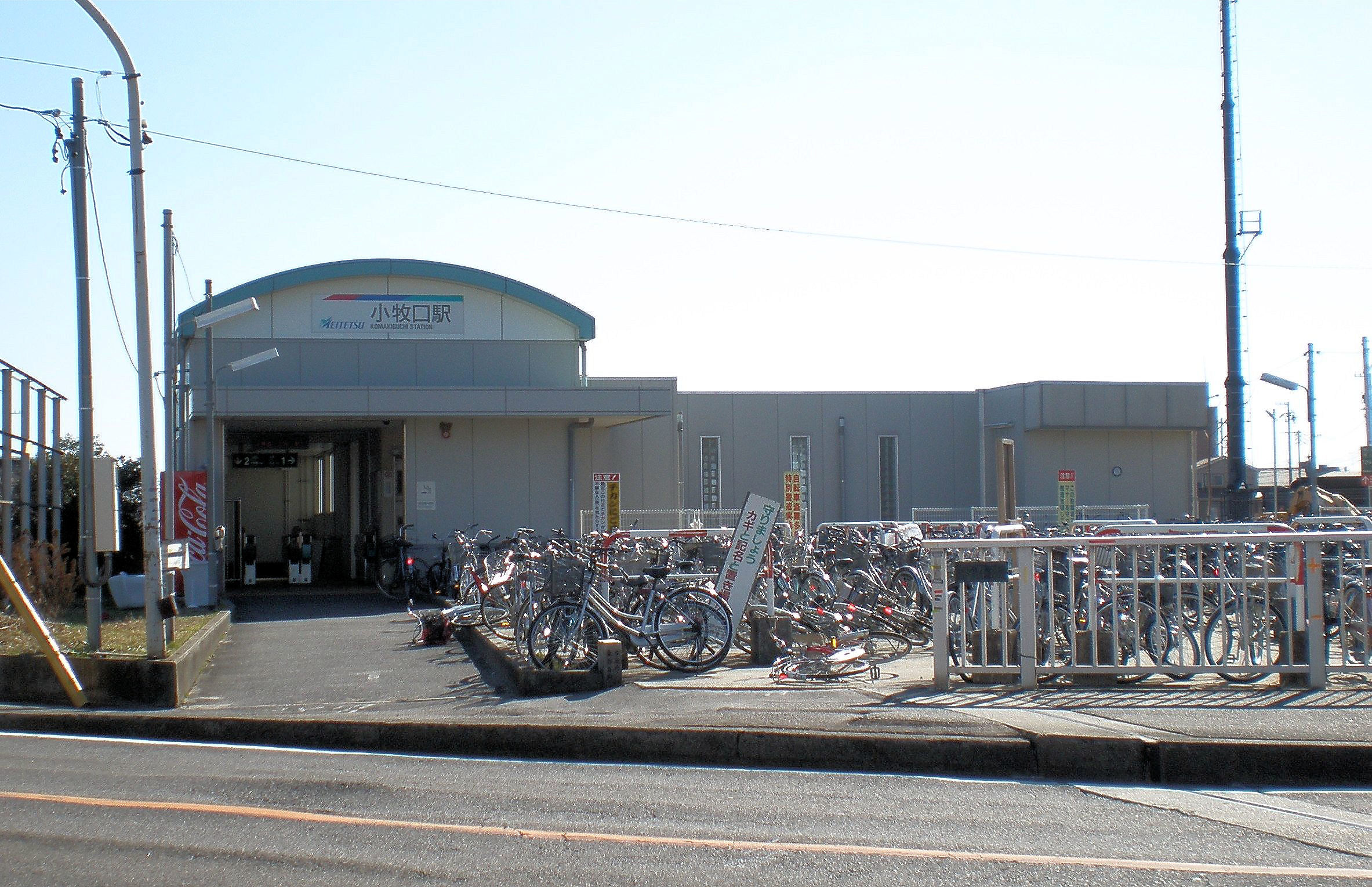
- Komakiguchi Station in February 2009

General information
- Location: Kitatoyama 1897-2, Komaki-shi, Aichi-ken 485-0023; Japan
- Coordinates: 35.2816°N 136.9275°E
- Operator: Meitetsu
- Line: ■ Meitetsu Komaki Line
- Distance: 9.0 kilometers from Kamiiida
- Platforms: 2 side platforms

Other information
- Status: Unstaffed
- Station code: KM07
- Website: Official website

History
- Opened: February 11, 1931

Passengers
- FY2017: 3249

Services
Preceding station	Meitetsu	Following station
Komaki towards Inuyama	Komaki Line	Manai towards Kamiiida
Location
- Location within Aichi Prefecture Location within Japan

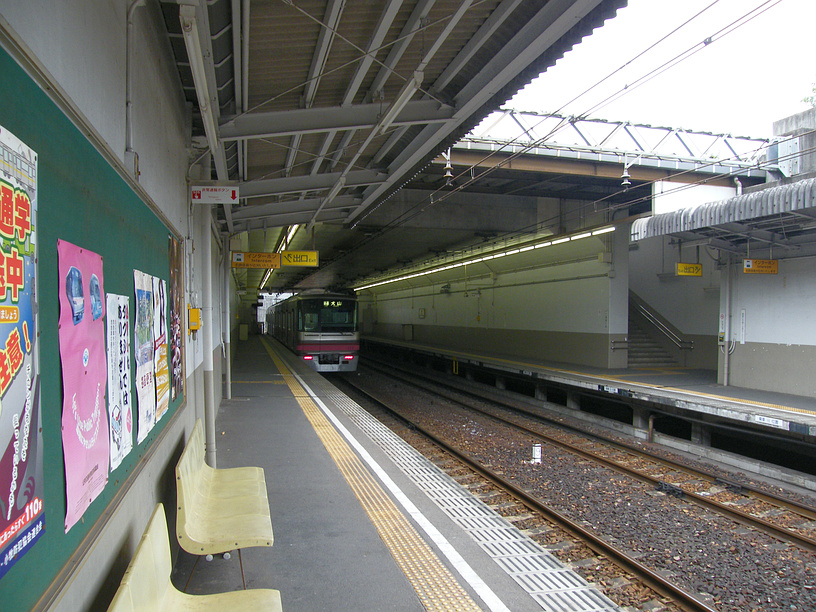
Platform

Komakiguchi Station (小牧口駅, Komakiguchi-eki) is a railway station in the city of Komaki, Aichi Prefecture, Japan, operated by Meitetsu.

== Lines ==
Komakiguchi Station is served by the Meitetsu Komaki Line, and is located 9.0 kilometers from the starting point of the line at Kamiiida.

== Station layout ==
The station has two opposed side platforms connected to the station building by a footbridge. The station has automated ticket machines, Manaca automated turnstiles and is unattended..

=== Platforms ===
1	■ Komaki Line	For Komaki and Inuyama
2	■ Komaki Line	For Heian-dōri

== Station history ==
Komakiguchi Station was opened on February 11, 1931. Operations were suspended in 1944 and resumed on May 1, 1964.

== Passenger statistics ==
In fiscal 2017, the station was used by an average of 3249 passengers daily.

== Surrounding area ==
- Komaki Minami Elementary School

== See also ==
- List of railway stations in Japan
