= Ajioka Station =

Railway station in Komaki, Aichi Prefecture, Japan

Ajioka Station 味岡駅

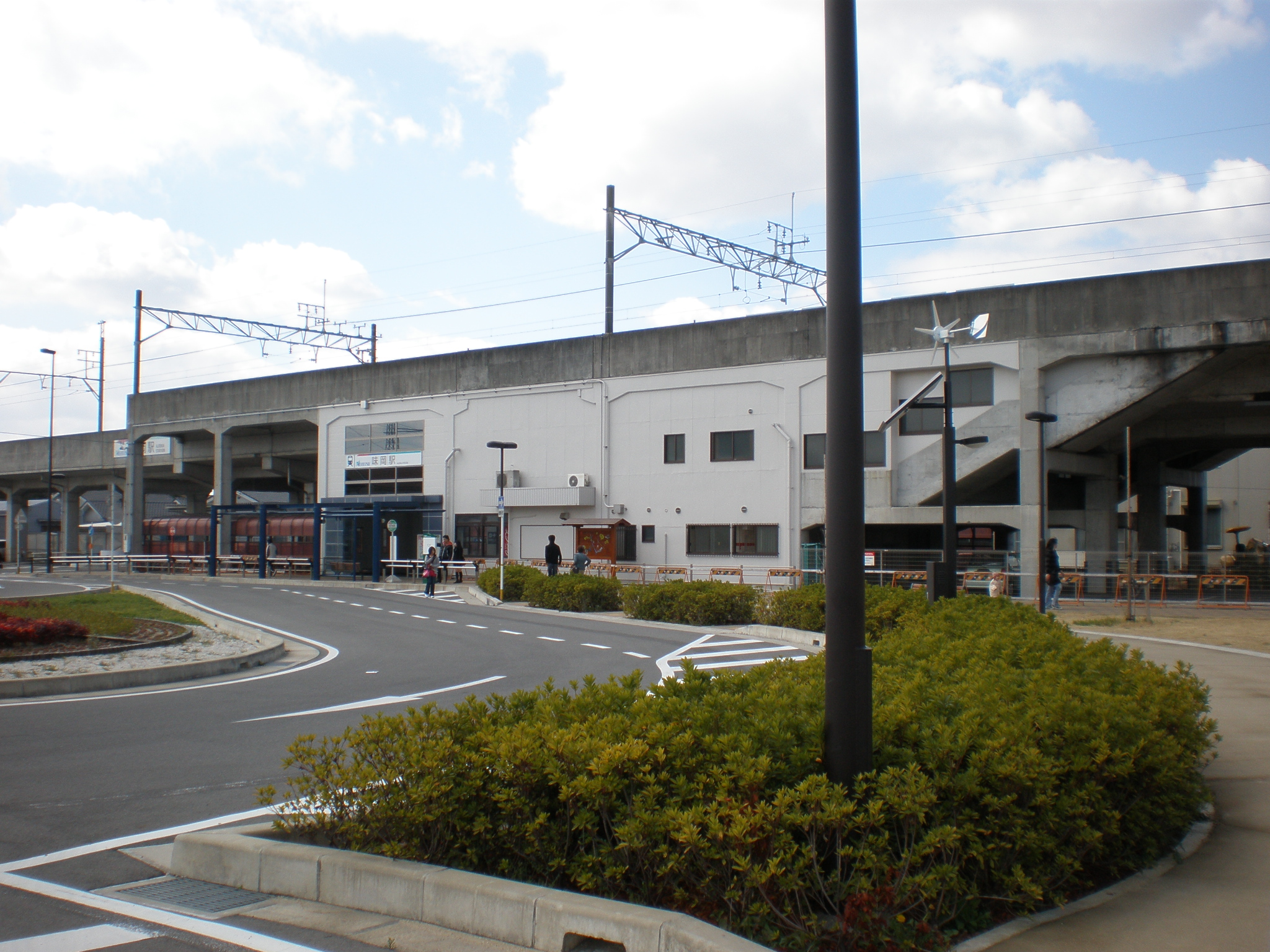
- Ajioka Station in March 2009

General information
- Location: 143 Iwazaki, Komaki-shi, Aichi-ken 485-0011; Japan
- Coordinates: 35°18′33.38″N 136°56′24.25″E
- Operator: Meitetsu
- Line: ■ Meitetsu Komaki Line
- Distance: 12.4 kilometers from Kamiiida
- Platforms: 1 side platform

Other information
- Status: Unstaffed
- Station code: KM04
- Website: Official website

History
- Opened: April 29, 1931

Passengers
- FY2017: 4576

Services
Preceding station	Meitetsu	Following station
Tagata Jinja-mae towards Inuyama	Komaki Line	Komakihara towards Kamiiida
Location
- Location within Aichi Prefecture Location within Japan

Ajioka Station (味岡駅, Ajioka-eki) is a railway station in the city of Komaki, Aichi Prefecture, Japan, operated by Meitetsu.

== Lines ==
Ajioka Station is served by the Meitetsu Komaki Line, and is located 12.4 kilometers from the starting point of the line at Kamiiida.

== Station layout ==
The station has one elevated side platform serving a single bi-directional track with the station building underneath. The station has automated ticket machines, Manaca automated turnstiles and is unattended.

== Station history ==
Ajioka Station was opened on April 29, 1931. The tracks were elevated in 1987.

== Passenger statistics ==
In fiscal 2017, the station was used by an average of 4576 passengers daily.

== Surrounding area ==
- Ajioka Elementary School

== See also ==
- List of Railway Stations in Japan
