= Haguro Station (Aichi) =

Railway station in Inuyama, Aichi Prefecture, Japan

Haguro Station 羽黒駅

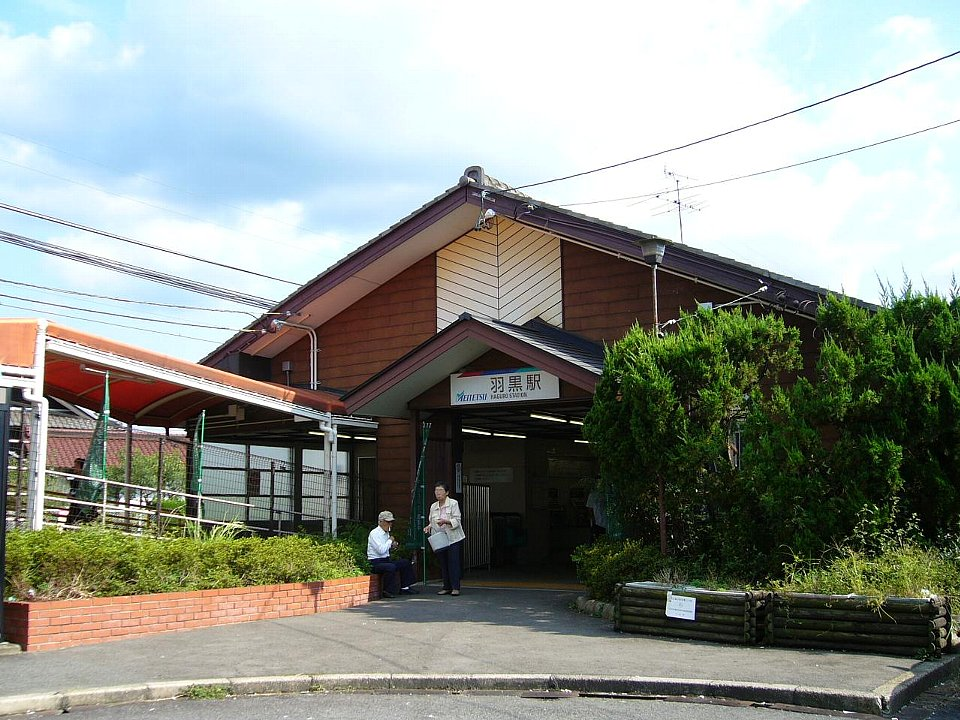
- Haguro Station in March 2013

General information
- Location: Furuichiba-75-1 Haguro, Inuyama-shi, Aichi-ken 484-0894; Japan
- Coordinates: 35.3514°N 136.952°E
- Operator: Meitetsu
- Line: ■ Meitetsu Komaki Line
- Distance: 17.2 kilometers from Kamiiida
- Platforms: 1 side platform

Other information
- Status: Unstaffed
- Station code: KM01
- Website: Official website

History
- Opened: April 29, 1931
- Former names: Meiji-mura-guchi (1966-1985)

Passengers
- FY2015: 3295

Services
Preceding station	Meitetsu	Following station
Inuyama Terminus	Komaki Line	Gakuden towards Kamiiida
Location
- Location within Aichi Prefecture Location within Japan

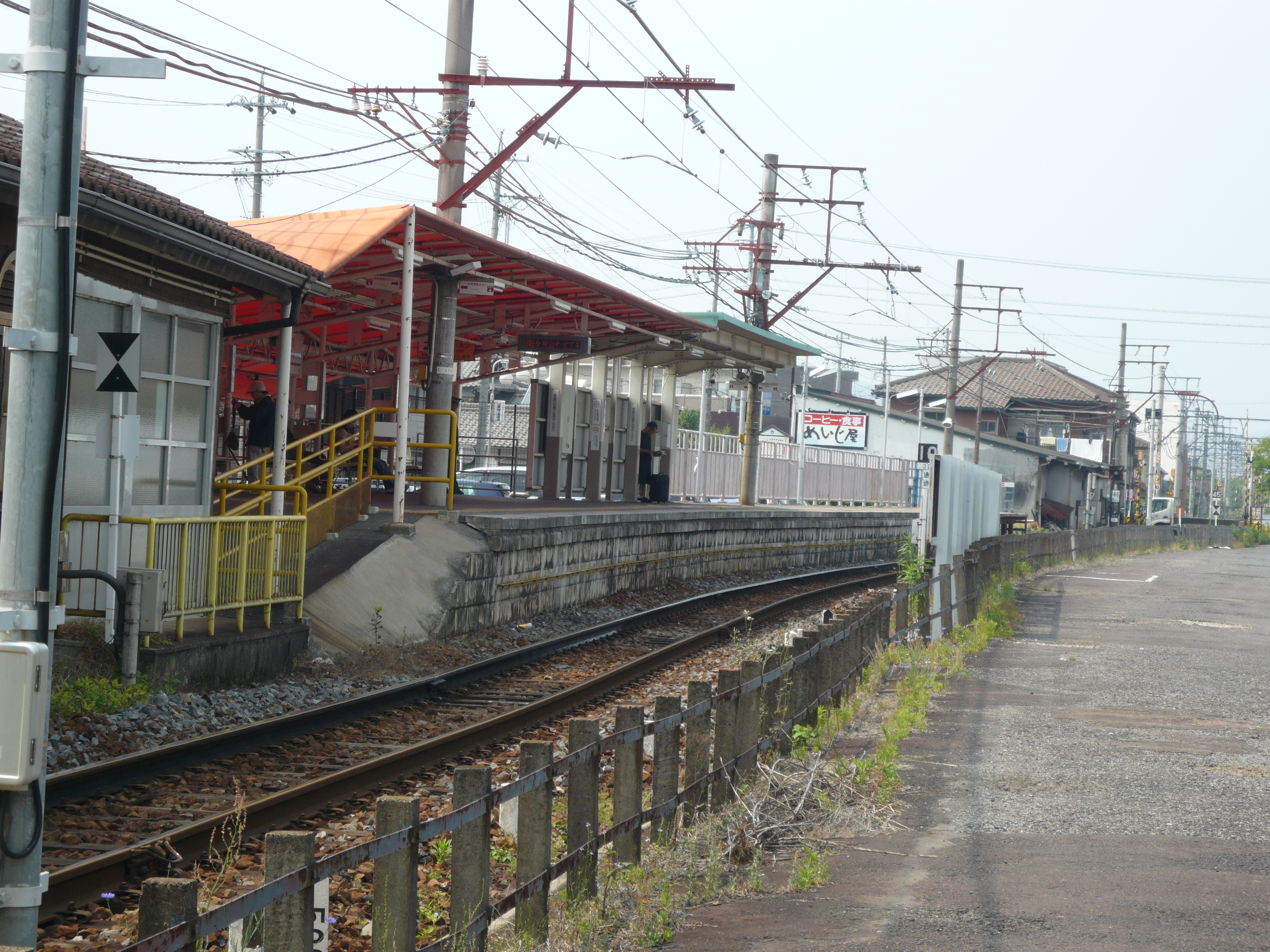
Platform

Haguro Station (羽黒駅, Haguro-eki) is a railway station in the city of Inuyama, Aichi Prefecture, Japan, operated by Meitetsu.

== Lines ==
Haguro Station is served by the Meitetsu Komaki Line, and is located 17.2 kilometers from the starting point of the line at Kamiiida.

== Station layout ==
The station has one side platform serving a single bi-directional track. The station has automated ticket machines, Manaca automated turnstiles and is unattended.

== Station history ==
Haguro Station was opened on April 29, 1931. On November 3, 1966 it was renamed Meiji-mura-guchi Station (明治村口駅). A new station building was completed in 1977. The station reverted to its original name on October 9, 1985.

== Passenger statistics ==
In fiscal 2015, the station was used by an average of 3295 passengers daily.

== Surrounding area ==
- Tobu Junior High School
- Nambu Junior High School
- Haguro Elementary School

== See also ==
- List of railway stations in Japan
