= Komakihara Station =

Railway station in Komaki, Aichi Prefecture, Japan

Komakihara Station 小牧原駅

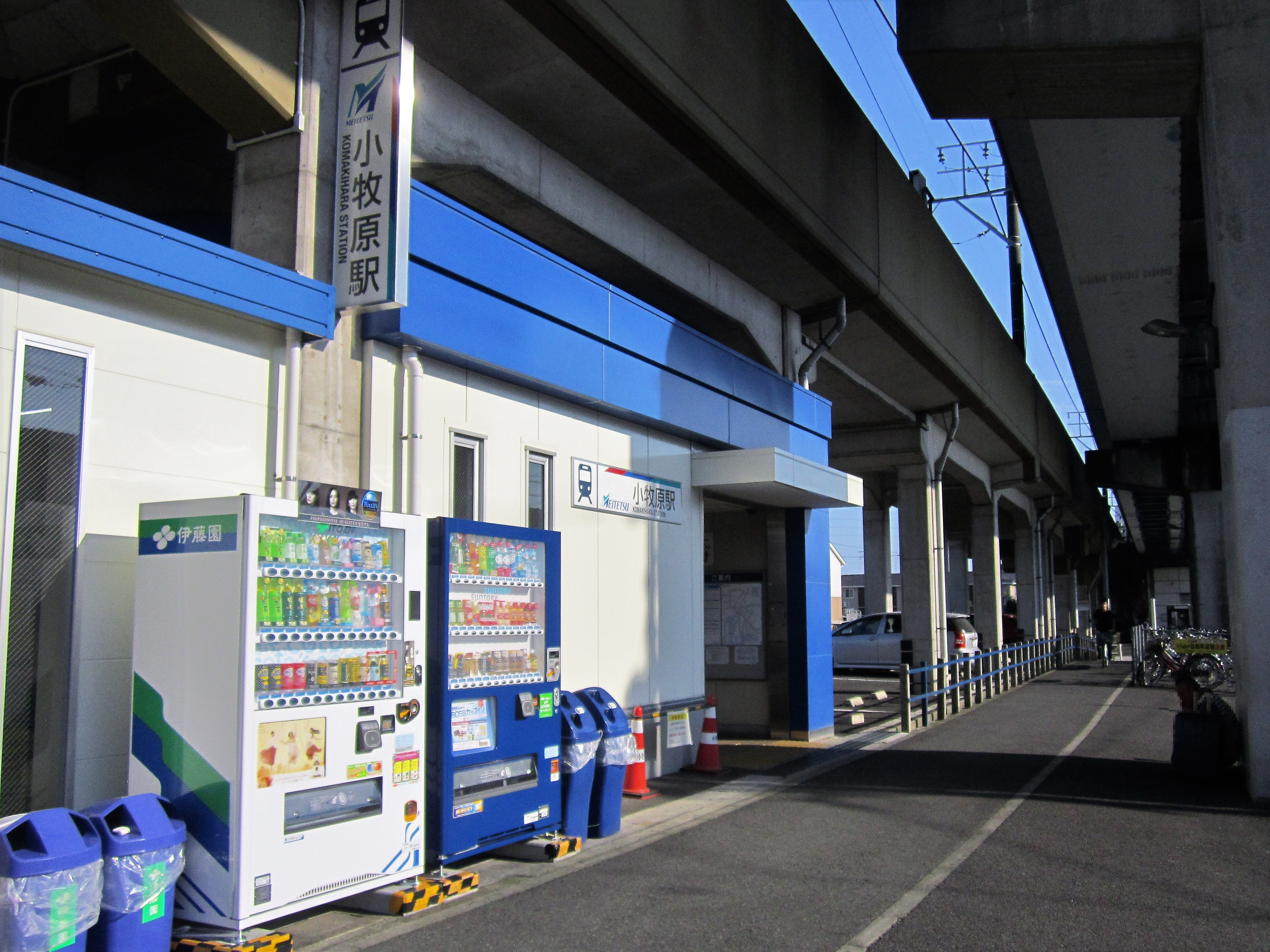
- Komakihara Station in August 2019

General information
- Location: Komakihara Shinden 1820-3, Komaki-shi, Aichi-ken 485-0012; Japan
- Coordinates: 35.2994°N 136.9353°E
- Operator: Meitetsu
- Line: ■ Meitetsu Komaki Line
- Distance: 11.3 kilometers from Kamiiida
- Platforms: 1 side platform

Other information
- Status: Unstaffed
- Station code: KM05
- Website: Official website

History
- Opened: April 29, 1931

Passengers
- FY2017: 3362

Services
Preceding station	Meitetsu	Following station
Ajioka towards Inuyama	Komaki Line	Komaki towards Kamiiida
Location
- Location within Aichi Prefecture Location within Japan

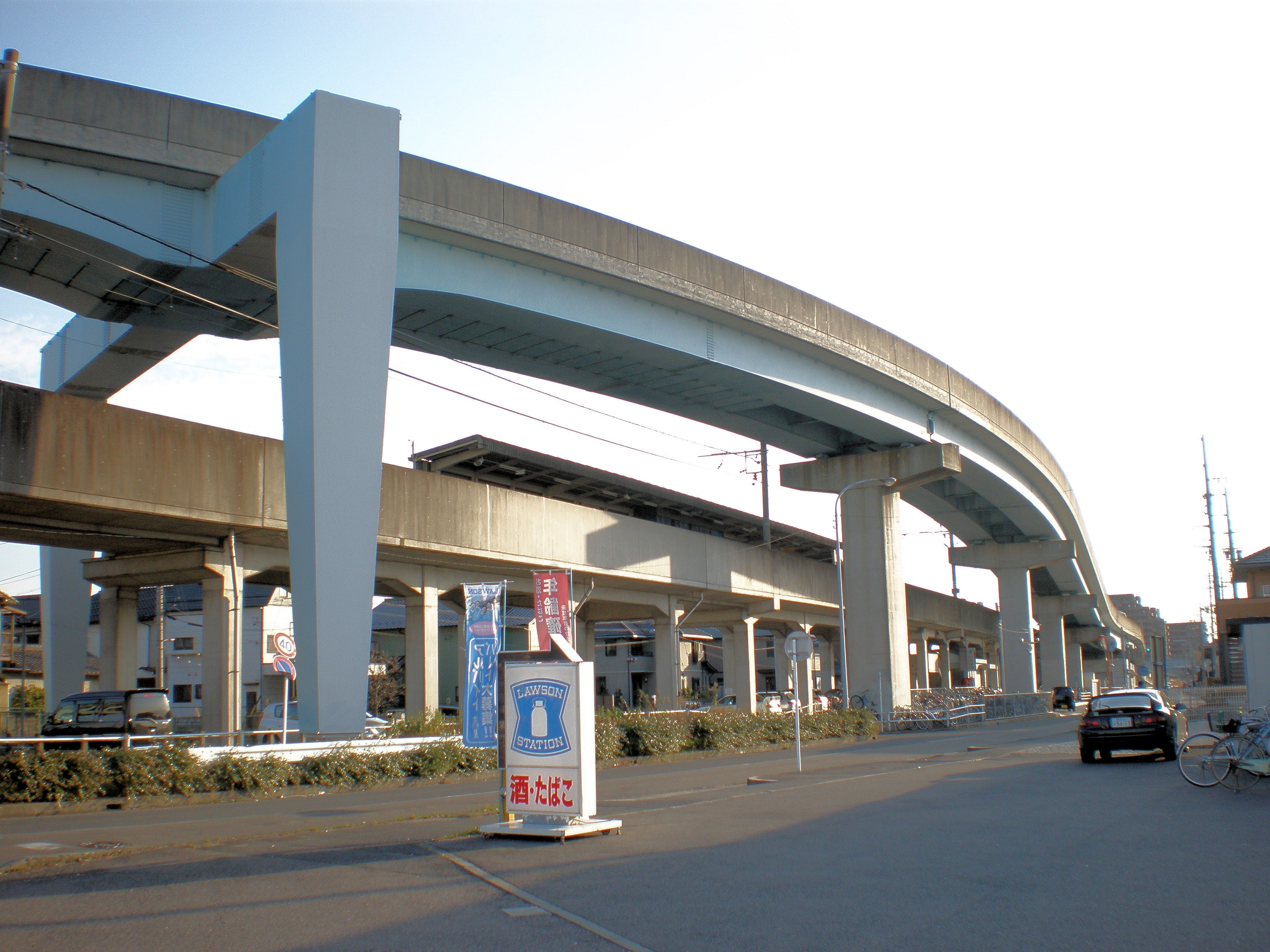
Platform

Komakihara Station (小牧原駅, Komakihara-eki) is a railway station in the city of Komaki, Aichi Prefecture, Japan, operated by Meitetsu.

== Lines ==
Komakihara Station is served by the Meitetsu Komaki Line, and is located 11.3 kilometers from the starting point of the line at Kamiiida.

== Station layout ==
The station has one elevated side platform serving a single bi-directional track with the station building underneath. The station has automated ticket machines, Manaca automated turnstiles and is unattended.

== Station history ==
Komakihara Station was opened on April 29, 1931. It was closed from 1944 to October 11, 1951. The present elevated station building was completed in June 1987. From 1991 to 2006, the station was also served by the Peachliner people mover system.

== Passenger statistics ==
In fiscal 2017, the station was used by an average of 3362 passengers daily.

== Surrounding area ==
- Mitsuyama Kofun group

== See also ==
- List of railway stations in Japan
