= Ajiyoshi Station =

Ajiyoshi Station is the name of two train stations in Japan:

- Ajiyoshi Station (Jōhoku Line)
- Ajiyoshi Station (Meitetsu)
