= Meitetsu Komaki Line =

Railway line in Aichi Prefecture, Japan

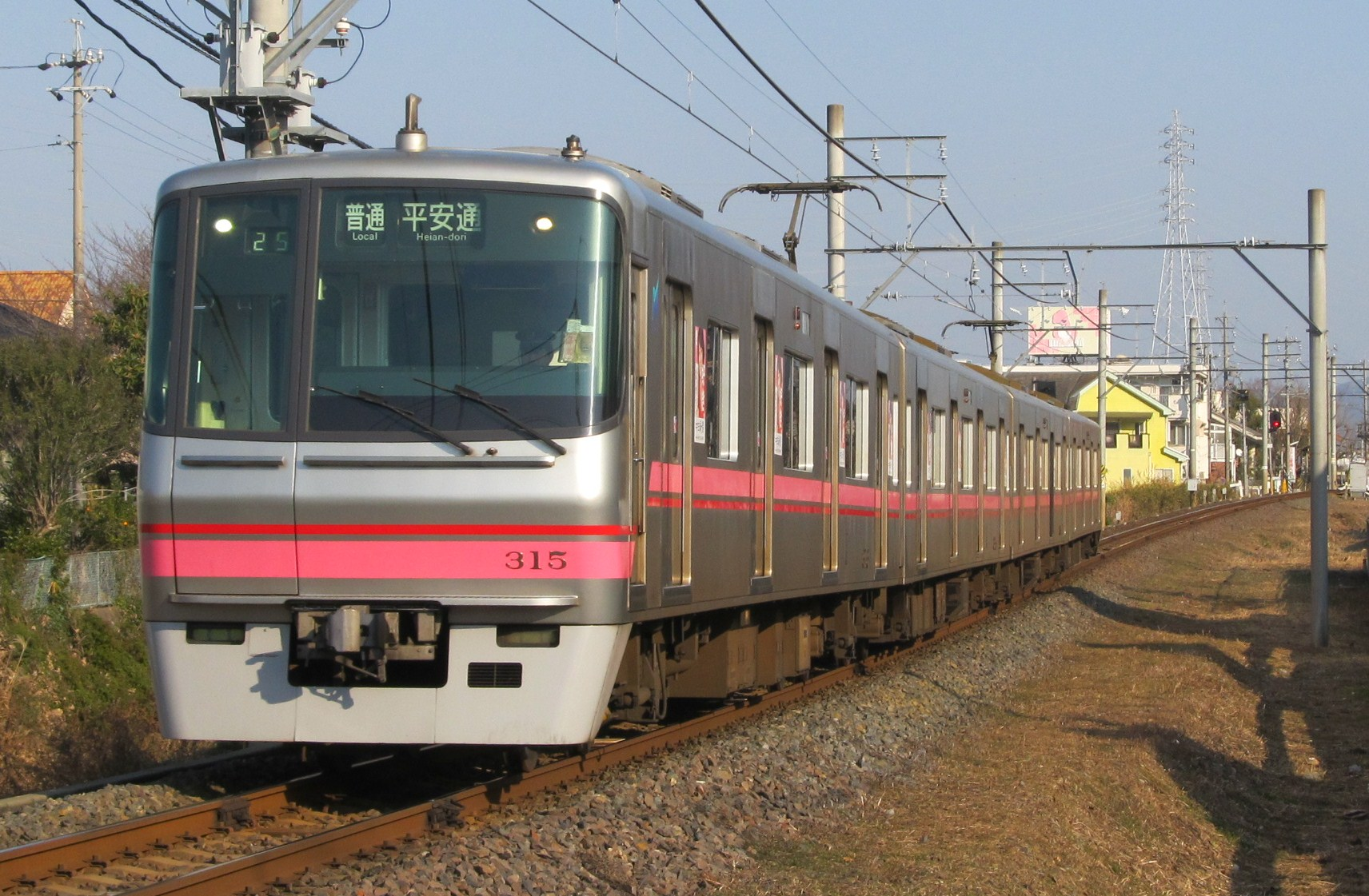
- A Meitetsu 300 series EMU

Overview
- Native name: 名鉄小牧線
- Owner: Meitetsu
- Locale: Aichi Prefecture
- Termini: Kamiiida; Inuyama
- Stations: 14

Service
- Type: Commuter rail
- Rolling stock: Meitetsu 300 series Nagoya Municipal Subway 7000 series (through service)
- Daily ridership: 14,743 (FY2008)

History
- Opened: February 11, 1931; 95 years ago

Technical
- Line length: 20.6 km (12.80 mi)
- Track gauge: 1,067 mm (3 ft 6 in)
- Electrification: 1,500 V DC, overhead catenary

The Meitetsu Komaki Line (名鉄小牧線, Meitetsu Komaki-sen) is a 20.6 km (12.8 mi) railway line in Aichi Prefecture, Japan, operated by the private railway operator Meitetsu (Nagoya Railroad), connecting Kamiiida Station in Nagoya with Inuyama Station in Inuyama. The track from Kamiiida to Ajima is mostly underground, a continuation of the Kamiiida Line operated by the Nagoya Municipal Subway.

== History ==
The line was opened in 1931. The line was not electrified back then and used diesel multiple units for services. The Kamiiida to Komaki section electrified at 600 V DC in 1942, and the section to Inuyama electrified in 1947.

CTC signalling was commissioned on the 4 km (2.5 mi) section between Komaki and Buzan (since closed) in 1954, being the first use of this system by Meitetsu, and the voltage was increased to 1,500 V DC in 1964.

The line was double-tracked in stages between 1977 and 2003.

Nagoya Municipal Subway Kamiiida Line through services commenced on 27 March 2003. A newly built underground section between Ajima and Kamiiida stations replaced the previous above-ground section.

== Stations ==
All stations are in Aichi Prefecture.

No.	Picture	Name	Japanese	Distance (km)	Transfers	Location
KM13		Kamiiida	上飯田	0.0	Nagoya Municipal Subway: Kamiiida Line (K01)	Kita-ku, Nagoya
KM12		Ajima	味鋺	2.3		Kita-ku, Nagoya
KM11		Ajiyoshi	味美	3.7		Kasugai
KM10		Kasugai	春日井	5.4		Kasugai
KM09		Ushiyama	牛山	6.9		Kasugai
KM08		Manai	間内	7.8		Kasugai
KM07		Komakiguchi	小牧口	9.0		Komaki
KM06		Komaki	小牧	9.8		Komaki
KM05		Komakihara	小牧原	11.3		Komaki
KM04		Ajioka	味岡	12.4		Komaki
KM03		Tagata-jinja-mae	田県神社前	13.3		Komaki
KM02		Gakuden	楽田	14.9		Inuyama
KM01		Haguro	羽黒	17.2		Inuyama
IY15		Inuyama	犬山	20.6	Inuyama Line; Hiromi Line	Inuyama

=== Former connecting lines ===
- Ajima Station: A 2 km (1.2 mi) line to Shin-Kachigawa operated between 1931 and 1937.
- Toyoyama Station (since closed): A line to service the Komaki airfield opened in 1944. Closing date is not known. Prior to the construction of the Chūbu Centrair International Airport (serviced by the Meitetsu Airport Line), it had been proposed to upgrade the Komaki airfield to become the Nagoya International Airport, with a connecting line from Ajiyoshi station.
- Komaki Station: A 6 km (3.7 mi) line electrified at 600 V DC to Iwakura on the Inuyama line opened in 1920. The voltage on the line was increased to 1,500 V DC in 1955, and the line closed in 1964. In 1945 construction began on a 13 km (8.1 mi) loop line to Ajima (utilising the closed Shin-Kachigawa line mentioned above) to service an army arsenal and cadet school. The roadbed was about 50% complete when work was abandoned due to the end of the war.

== Rolling stock ==
The Komaki Line uses the following train types:

- Meitetsu 300 series 4-car EMUs
- Nagoya Municipal Subway 7000 series 4-car EMUs
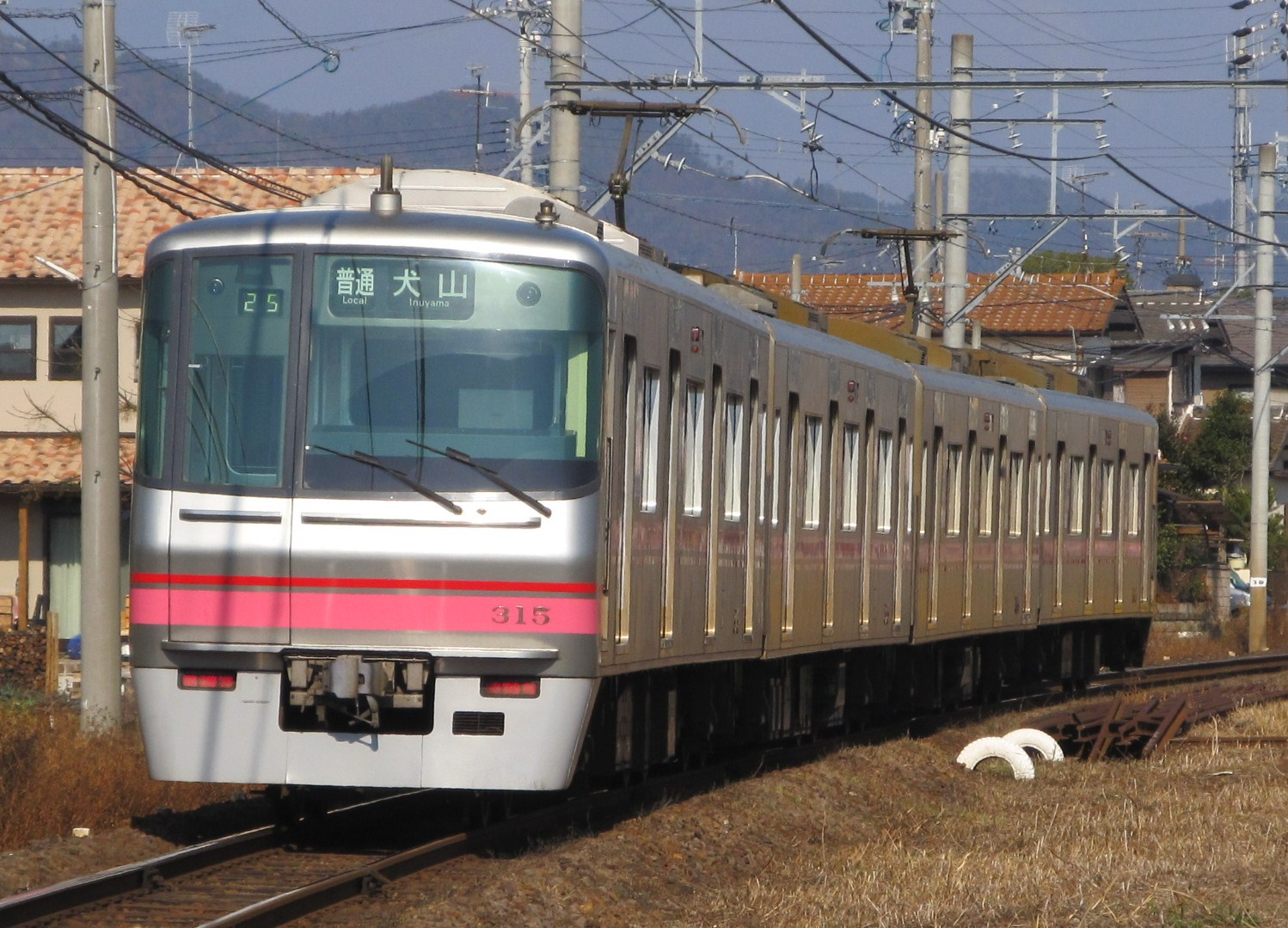
Meitetsu 300 series

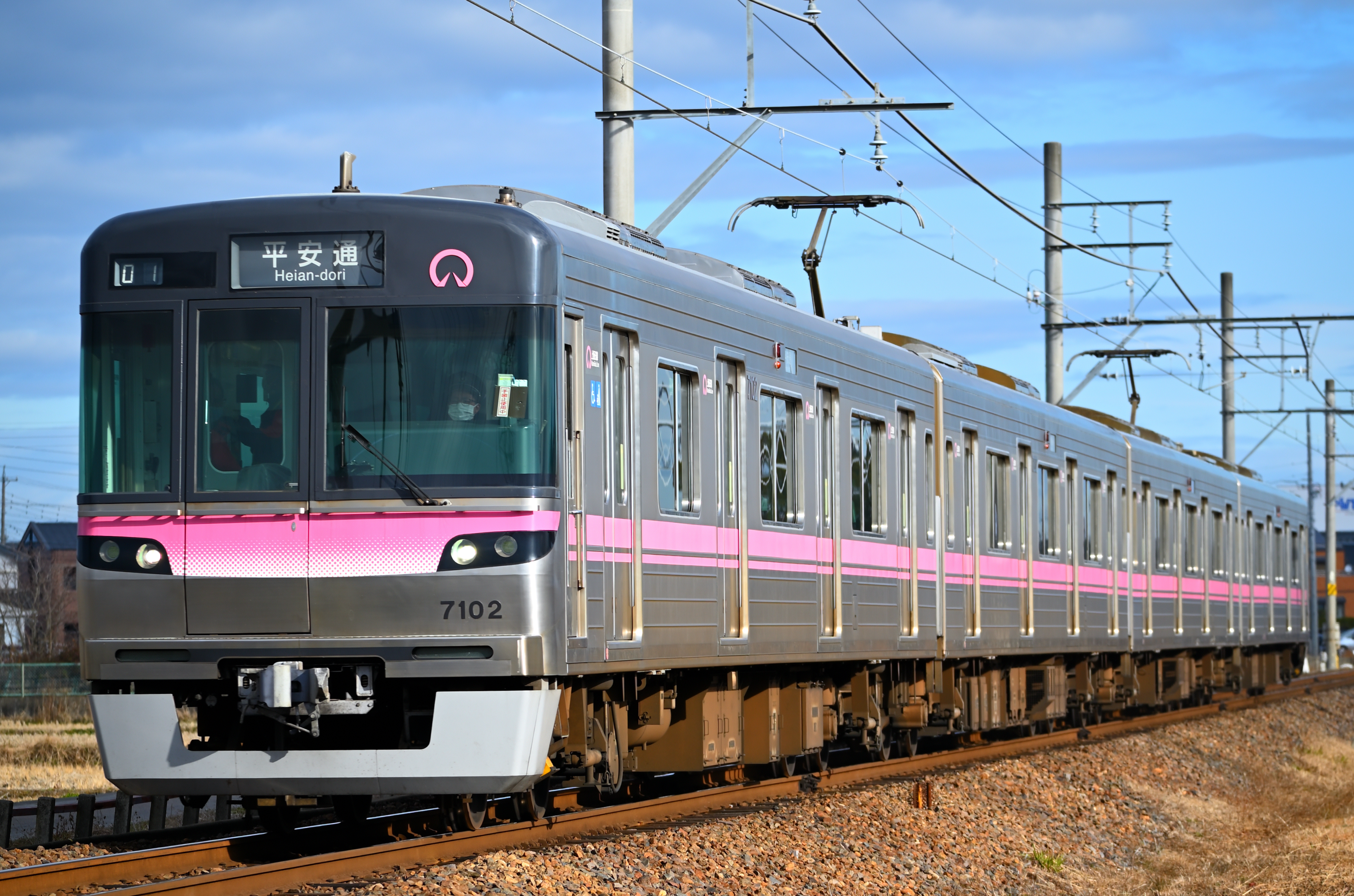
Nagoya Municipal Subway 7000 series

== See also ==
- List of railway lines in Japan
