= Komaki Station =

Railway station in Komaki, Aichi Prefecture, Japan

Komaki Station 小牧駅

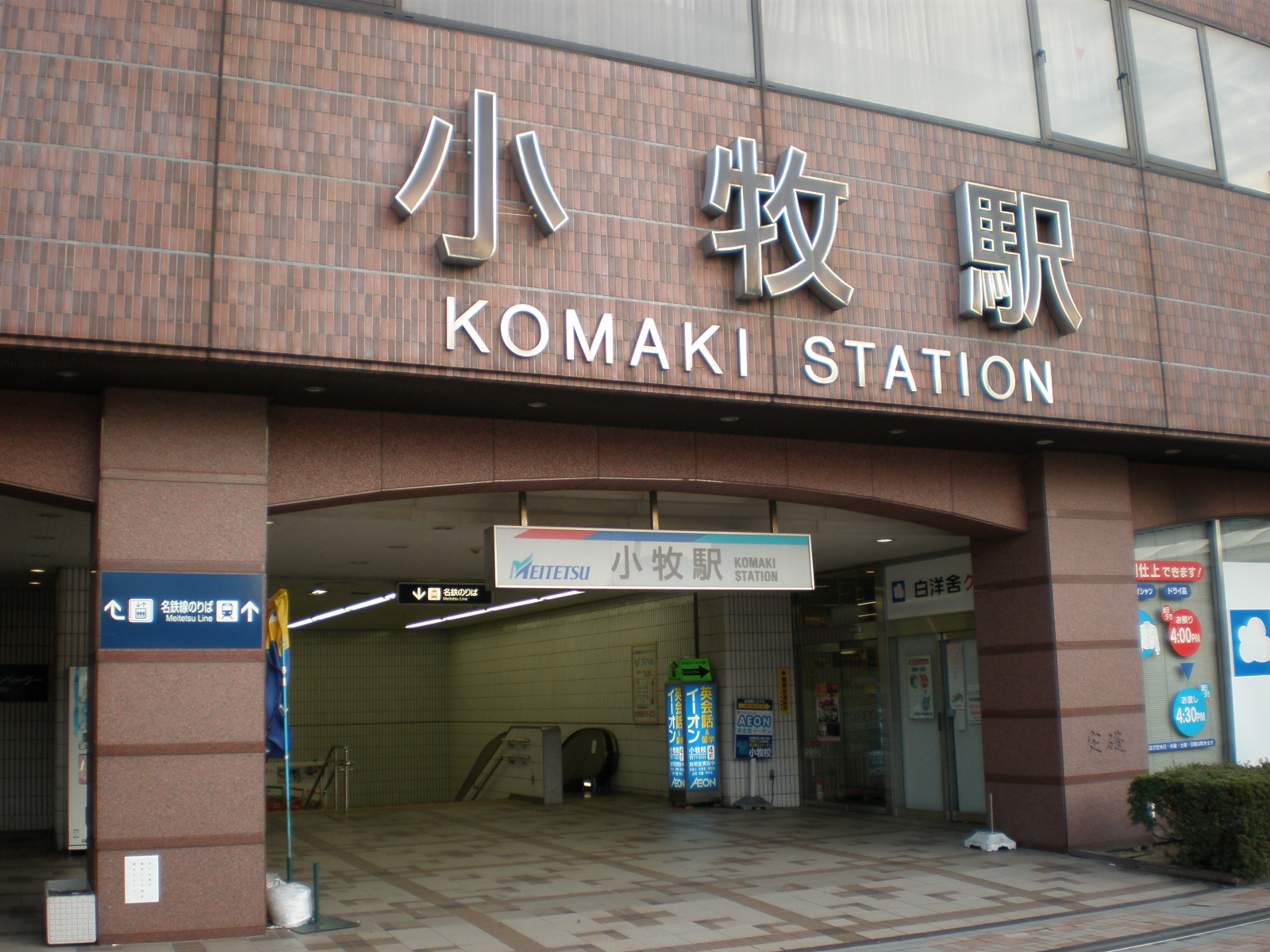
- Komaki Station West Exit

General information
- Location: 1-260 Chuo, Komaki-shi, Aichi-ken 485-0029; Japan
- Coordinates: 35.2890°N 136.9286°E
- Operator: Meitetsu
- Line: ■ Meitetsu Komaki Line
- Distance: 9.8 kilometers from Kamiiida
- Platforms: 1 side + 1 island platform

Other information
- Status: Staffed
- Station code: KM06
- Website: Official website

History
- Opened: September 23, 1920

Passengers
- FY2017: 11,360

Services
Preceding station	Meitetsu	Following station
Komakihara towards Inuyama	Komaki Line	Komakiguchi towards Kamiiida
Location
- Location within Aichi Prefecture Location within Japan

Track Layout

Komaki Station (小牧駅, Komaki-eki) is a railway station in the city of Komaki, Aichi Prefecture, Japan, operated by Meitetsu.

== Lines ==
Komaki Station is served by the Meitetsu Komaki Line, and is located 9.8 kilometers from the starting point of the line at Kamiiida.

== Station layout ==
The station is an underground station with one island platform and one side platform, located in the basement of the Meitetsu Komaki Hotel. The station has automated ticket machines, Manaca automated turnstiles and is staffed.

=== Platforms ===
1	■ Komaki Line	For Inuyama
2	■ Komaki Line	For Heian-dōri (starting trains)
2	■ Komaki Line	For Heian-dōri

== Station history ==
Komaki Station was opened on September 23, 1920. The station was relocated underground in 1989. From 1991 to 2006, it was also the terminal station on the Peachliner people mover system.

== Passenger statistics ==
In fiscal 2017, the station was used by an average of 11,360 passengers daily.

== Surrounding area ==
- Meitetsu Komaki Hotel
- Komaki High School
- Komaki Daiichi Hospital

== See also ==
- List of railway stations in Japan
- Peachliner
