= Heian-dōri Station =

Metro station in Nagoya, Japan

M11 K02 Heian-dōri Station 平安通駅
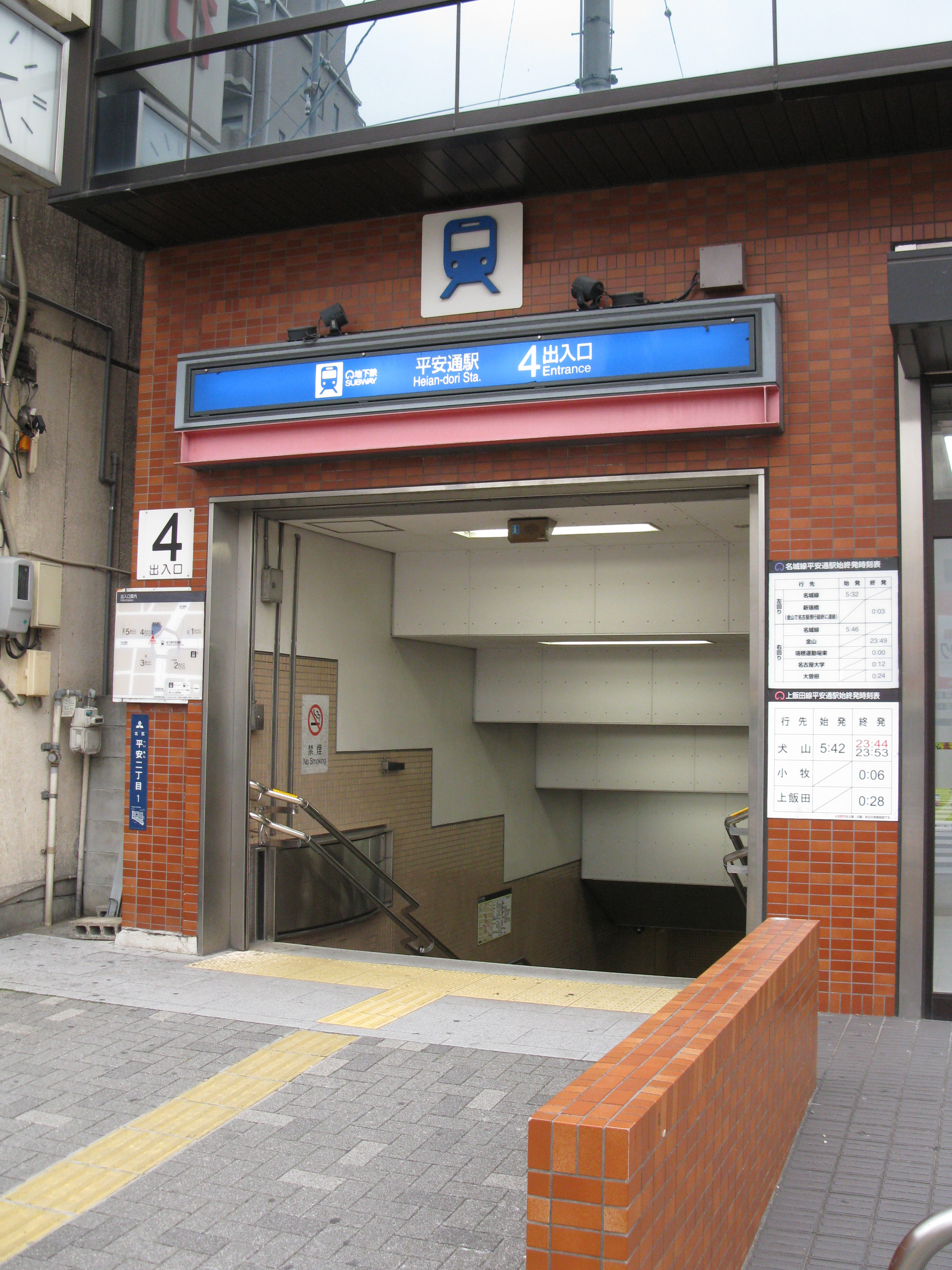
- Heian-dōri Station No.4 exit

General information
- Location: 1-15 Heiandōri, Kita-ku, Nagoya-shi, Aichi -ken 462-0816; Japan
- Coordinates: 35.1958°N 136.9300°E
- System: Nagoya Municipal Subway station
- Owner: Kami-iida Link Line Co., Ltd. Kami-iida Line platforms; Transportation Bureau City of Nagoya Meijo Line platforms
- Operator: Transportation Bureau City of Nagoya
- Lines: Meijō Line; Kamiiida Line
- Distance: 8.2 km from Kanayama
- Connections: Bus stop

Other information
- Station code: M11 , K02

History
- Opened: 20 December 1971; 54 years ago

Passengers
- FY2018: 6,346 daily

Services
Preceding station	Nagoya Municipal Subway	Following station
Shiga-hondōri M10 anticlockwise	Meijō Line	Ōzone M12 clockwise
Kamiiida K01 Terminus	Kamiiida Line	Terminus
Location
- Location within Aichi Prefecture Location within Japan

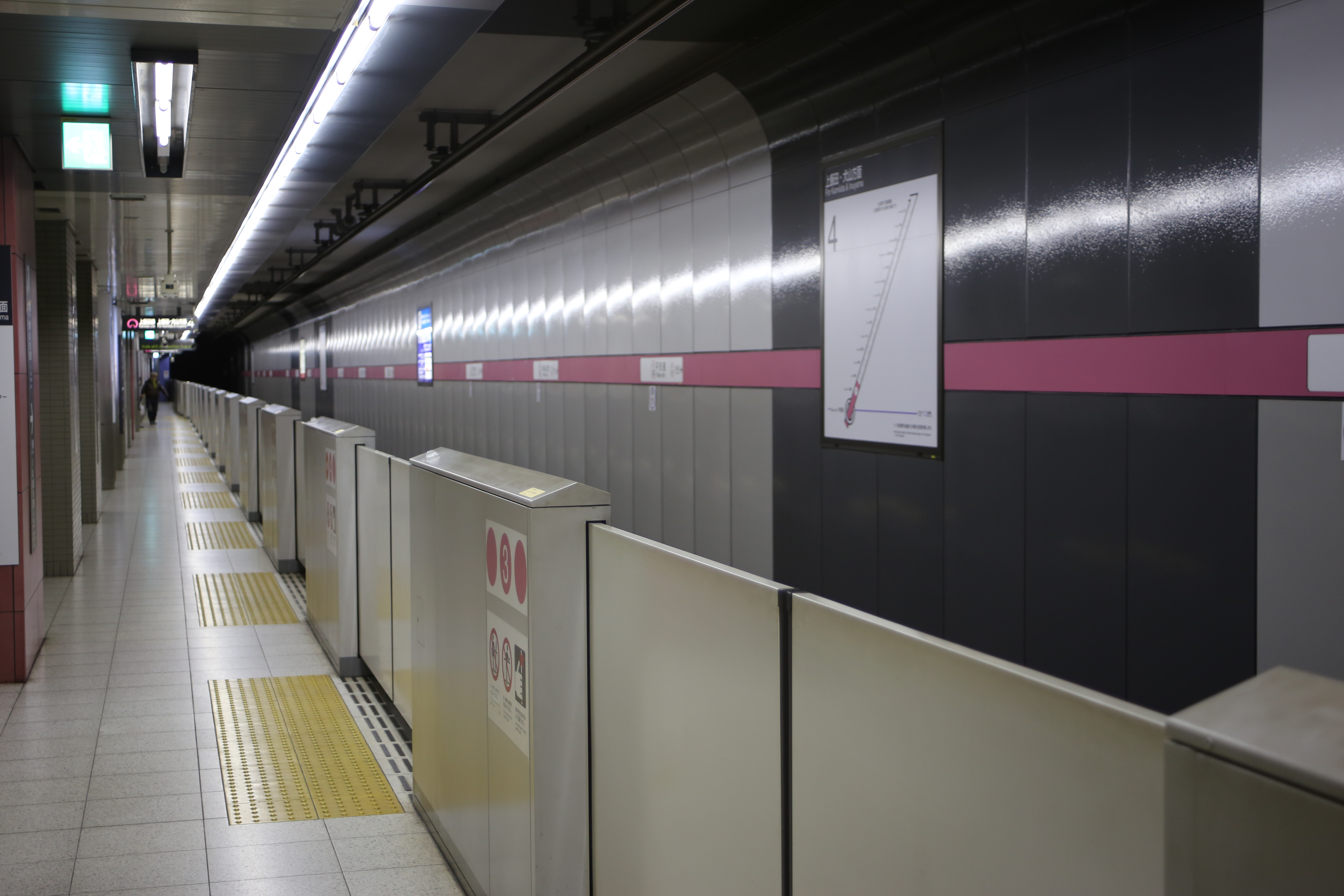
Kamiiida line platforms

Heian-dōri Station (平安通駅, Heian-dōri-eki) is an underground interchange metro station located in Kita-ku, Nagoya, Aichi Prefecture, Japan, operated by the Transportation Bureau City of Nagoya.

== Lines ==
Heian-dōri Station is served by the Nagoya Municipal Subway Meijō Line, and is 8.2 kilometers from the starting point of that line at Kanayama. It is also served by the Kamiiida Line and is 0.8 kilometers from the starting point of that line at Kamiiida.

== Layout ==
The Meijō Line portion of the station has two underground side platforms and the Kamiiida Line portion of the station has one underground island platform underneath that of the Meijō Line.

=== Platforms ===
1	■ Meijō Line	For Sakae, Kanayama, Aratama-bashi, and Nagoyakō
2	■ Meijō Line	For Ōzone and Motoyama
3	■ Kamiiida Line	For Komaki and Inuyama
4	■ Kamiiida Line	For Komaki and Inuyama

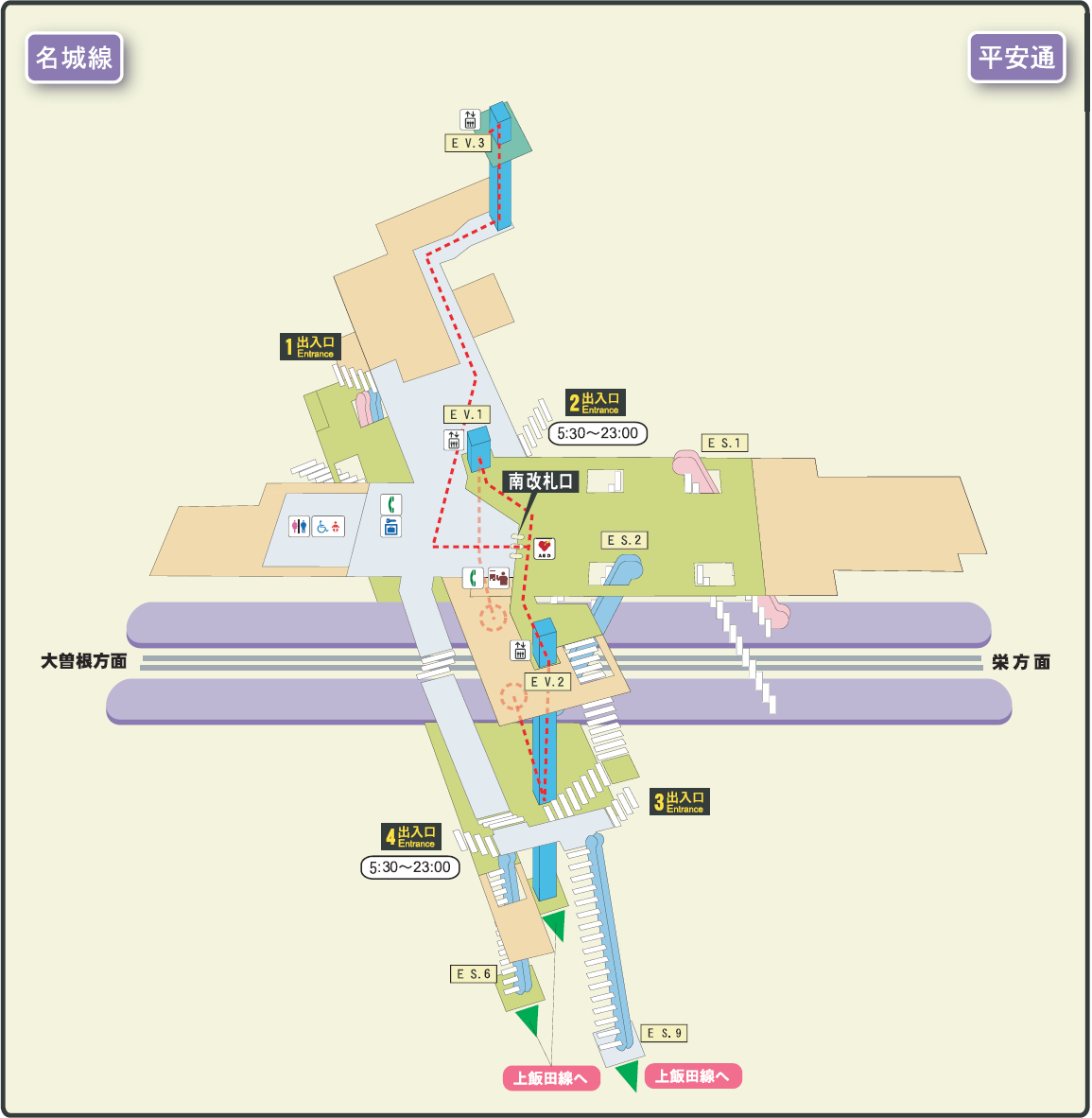
Meijō Line platform layout

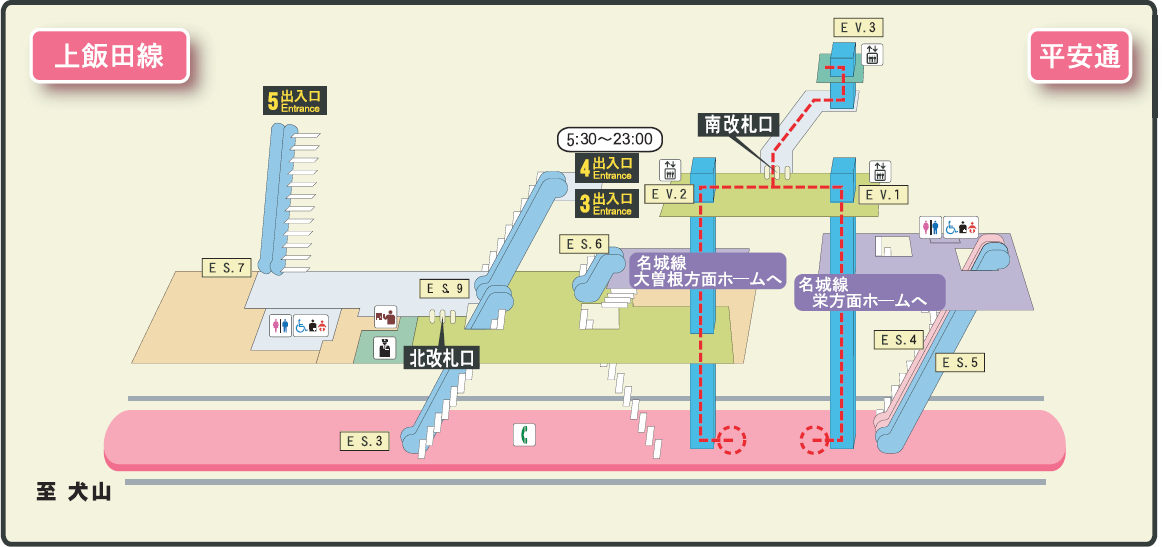
Kamiiida Line platform layout

== Station history ==
Heian-dōri Station was opened on 20 December 1971 as a station on the Meijō Line. The Kamiida Line connected to the station on 27 March 2003.

== Passenger statistics ==
In fiscal 2018, the station was used by an average of 6,340 passengers daily.

=== Surrounding area ===
- Meihoku Elementary School
- Wakaba Junior High School

== See also ==
- Official home page
