= Kamiiida Station =

Railway and metro station in Nagoya, Japan

Coordinates: 35.2039°N 136.9297°E

K01 Kamiiida Station 上飯田駅

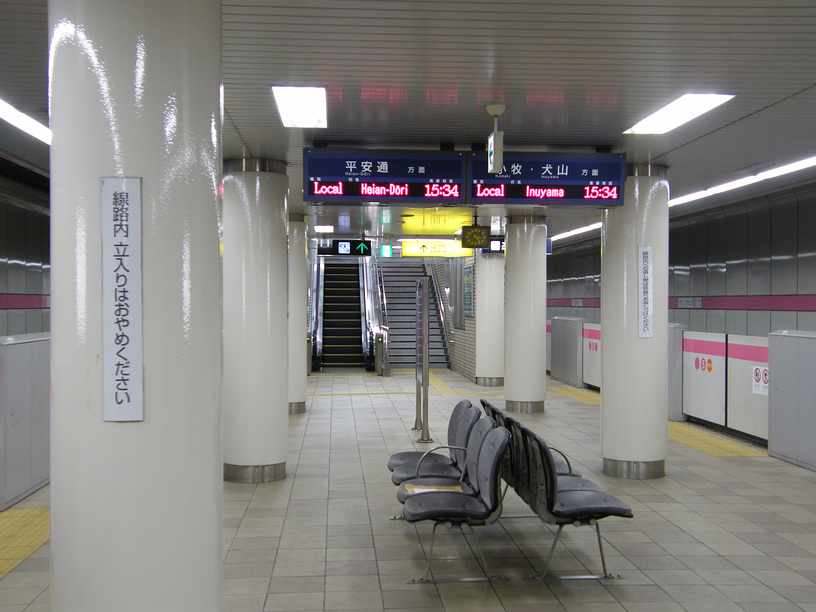
- Station platforms

General information
- Location: Kamiiidatōri 1-15, Kita, Nagoya, Aichi （名古屋市北区上飯田通一丁目15） Japan
- System: Nagoya Municipal Subway station
- Operator: Meitetsu; Transportation Bureau City of Nagoya
- Lines: Komaki Line; Kamiiida Line
- Connections: Bus terminal

Other information
- Station code: K01

History
- Opened: February 11, 1931; 95 years ago

Passengers
- 2007: 4,925 daily

Services
Preceding station	Nagoya Municipal Subway	Following station
through to Komaki Line	Kamiiida Line	Heian-dōri K02 Terminus
Preceding station	Meitetsu	Following station
Ajima towards Inuyama	Komaki Line	through to Kamiiida Line
Location

Kamiiida Station (上飯田駅, Kamiiida-eki) is a railway station in Kita-ku, Nagoya, Aichi Prefecture, Japan. It was opened on February 11, 1931.

== History ==
The station opened as the terminus of the Meitetsu Komaki Line in 1931. A line of the Nagoya City Tram connected the station to the Ōzone Station from 1944 to 1971. The closure of the Nagoya City Tram line caused inconvenience for the commuters using the station. The connection of the station with the Nagoya Municipal Subway network was planned in 1972. In 1992, the proposed line was raised again as "a line that urgently needs to be built". The entire station was moved underground in 2003 as a result of the opening of the Kamiiida Line.

== Details ==
The station is located underground. Ticket gates with automated turnstiles are located on the basement first floor, while an island platform is located on the basement second floor. The floors and the surface are connected with elevators and escalators.

=== Platforms ===
1	■ Kamiiida Line	For Heian-dōri
2	■ Komaki Line	For Komaki and Inuyama
