= Jōsui Station =

Railway station in Toyota, Aichi Prefecture, Japan

Jōsui Station 浄水駅

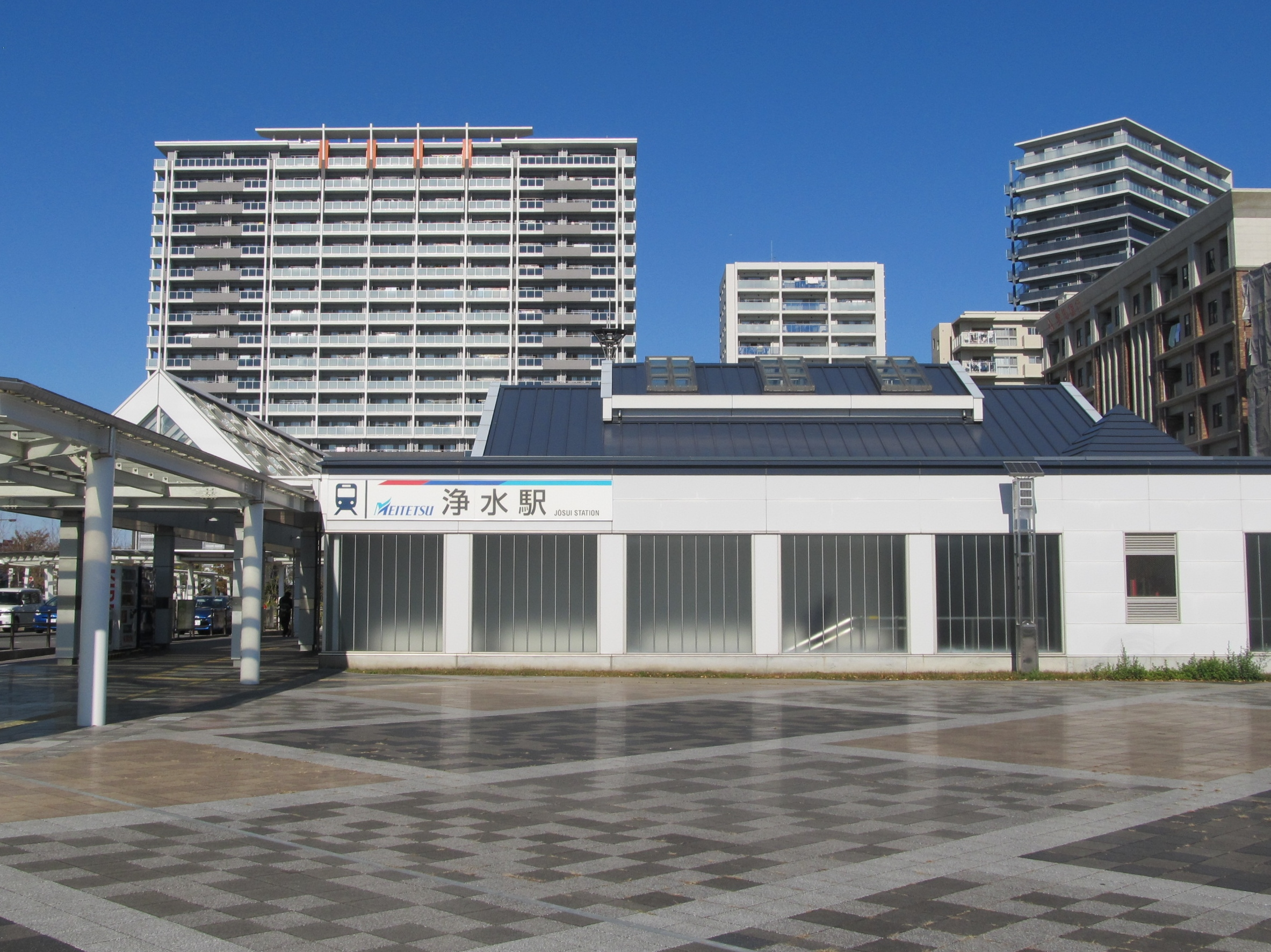
- Jōsui Station, November 2018

General information
- Location: Ibobara-243 Jōsuichō, Toyota-shi, Aichi-ken 470-0343; Japan
- Coordinates: 35.1213°N 137.1371°E
- Operator: Meitetsu
- Line: ■ Meitetsu Toyota Line
- Distance: 11.4 kilometers from Akaike
- Platforms: 2 side platforms

Other information
- Status: Staffed
- Station code: TT02
- Website: Official website

History
- Opened: 29 July 1979; 47 years ago

Passengers
- FY2017: 11,461

Services
Preceding station	Meitetsu	Following station
Miyoshigaoka towards Akaike	Toyota Line	Kami Toyota towards Toyotashi
Location
- Location within Aichi Prefecture Location within Japan

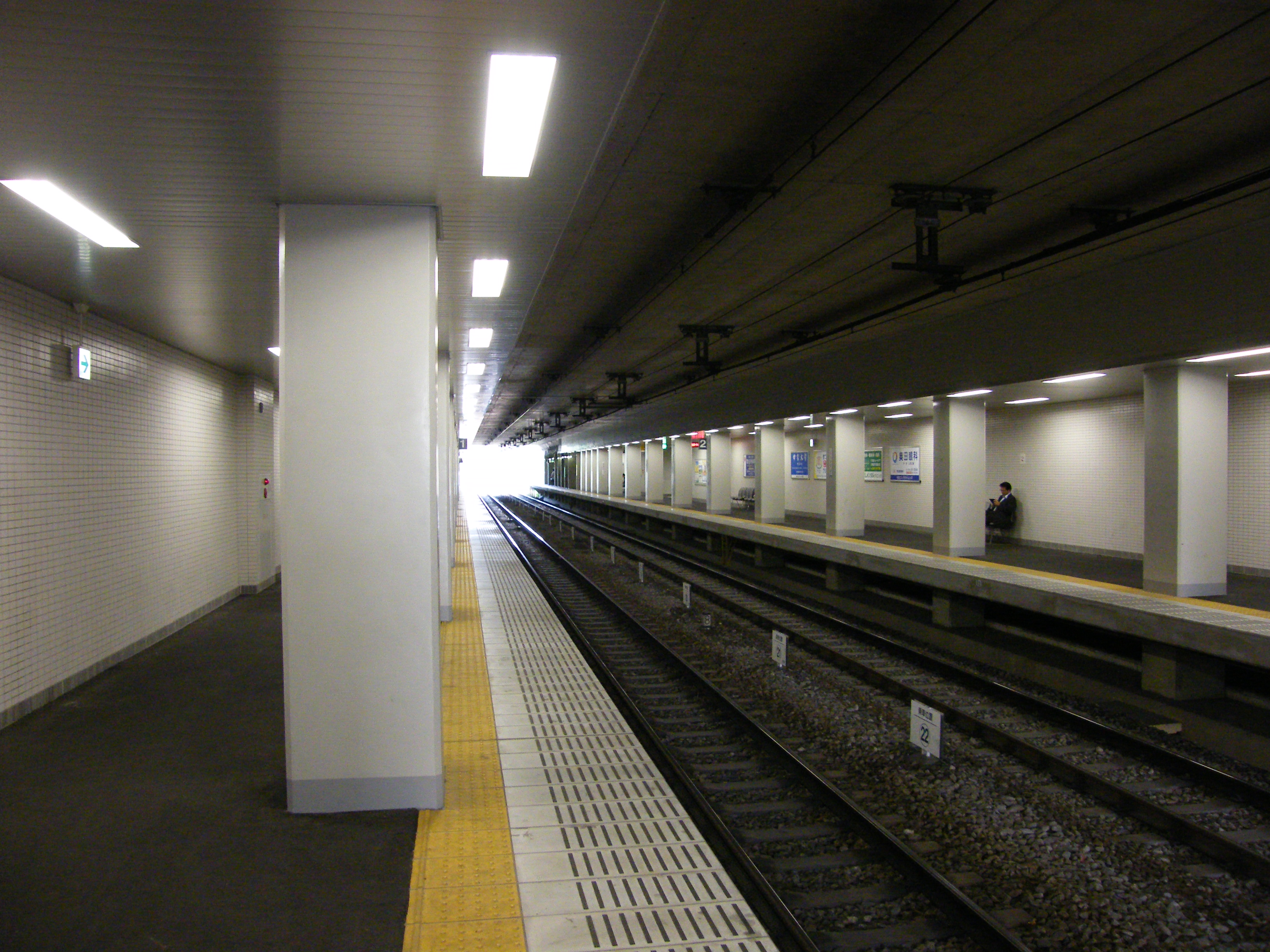
Platforms

Jōsui Station (浄水駅, Jōsui-eki) is a train station in the city of Toyota, Aichi Prefecture, Japan, operated by Meitetsu.

== Lines ==
Jōsui Station is served by the Meitetsu Toyota Line, and is located 3.8 kilometers from the starting point of the line at Umetsubo and 11.4 kilometers from Akaike.

== Station layout ==
The station has two opposed side platforms located underground, with the station building constructed above. The station has automated ticket machines, Manaca automated turnstiles and is staffed.

=== Platforms ===
1	■ Toyota Line	For Toyotashi
2	■ Toyota Line	For Fushimi, Kami-Otai

== Station history ==
Jōsui Station was opened on July 29, 1979.

== Passenger statistics ==
In fiscal 2017, the station was used by an average of 11,461 passengers daily.

== Surrounding area ==
- Toyota High School
- Jōsui Junior High School
- Jōsui Elementary School

== See also ==
- List of railway stations in Japan
