= Miyoshigaoka Station =

Railway station in Miyoshi, Aichi Prefecture, Japan

Miyoshigaoka Station 三好ケ丘駅

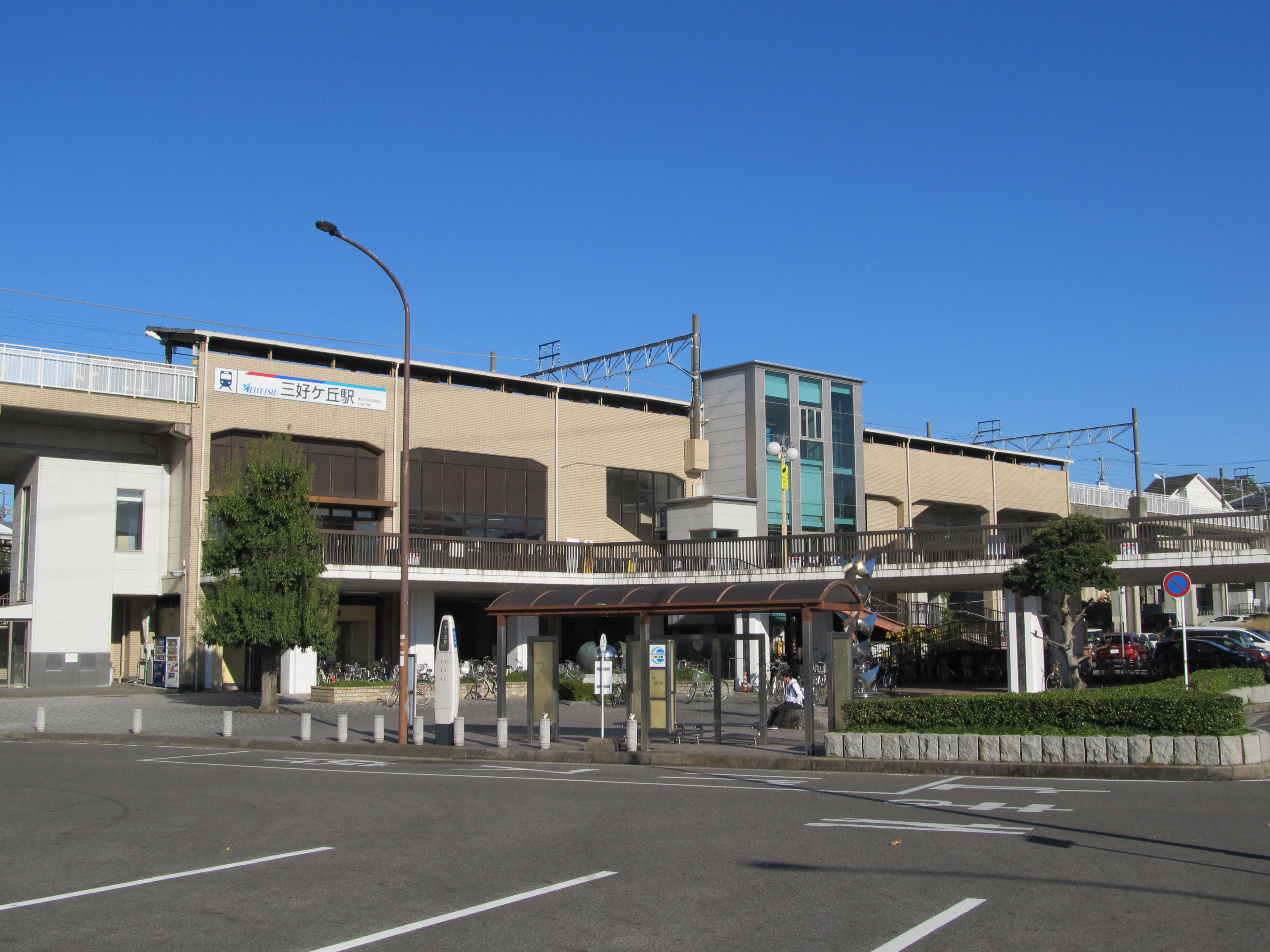
- Miyoshigaoka Station forecourt, March 2010

General information
- Location: 2-1-1 Miyoshigaokaasahi Miyoshi-shi, Aichi-ken 470-0203; Japan
- Coordinates: 35.1269°N 137.1110°E
- Line: ■ Meitetsu Toyota Line
- Distance: 29.4 kilometers from Kami-Otai
- Platforms: 2 side platforms

Other information
- Status: Unstaffed
- Station code: TT03
- Website: Official website

History
- Opened: 29 July 1979; 47 years ago

Passengers
- FY2017: 9926

Services
Preceding station	Meitetsu	Following station
Kurozasa towards Akaike	Toyota Line	Jōsui towards Toyotashi
Location
- Location within Aichi Prefecture Location within Japan

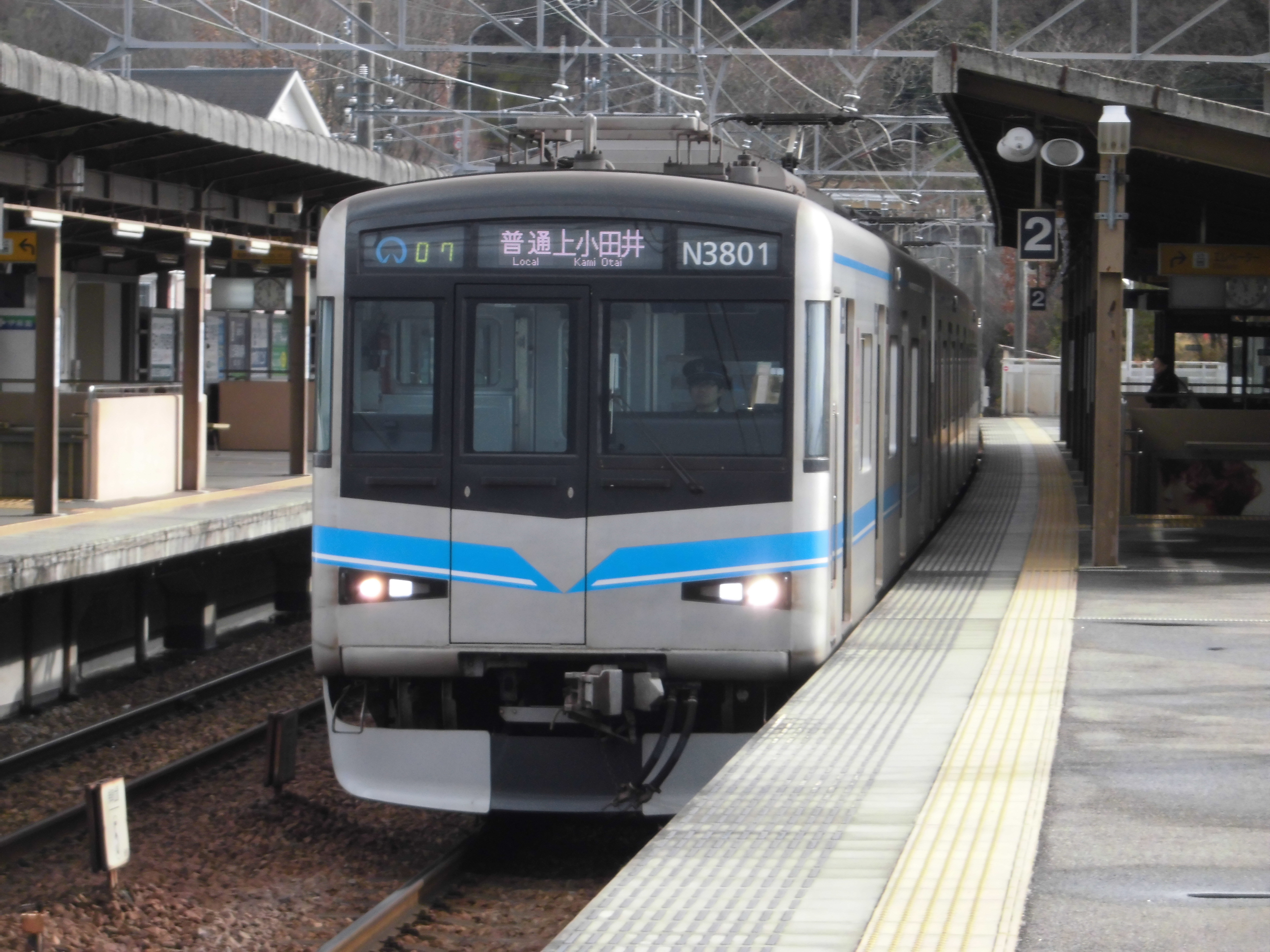
Platform

Miyoshigaoka Station (三好ケ丘駅, Miyoshigaoka-eki) is a train station in the city of Miyoshi, Aichi Prefecture, Japan, operated by Meitetsu.

== Lines ==
Miyoshigaoka Station is served by the Meitetsu Toyota Line, and is located 9.0 kilometers from the starting point of the line at Akaike and 29.4 kilometers from Kami-Otai.

== Station layout ==
The station has two elevated opposed side platforms with the station building underneath. The station has automated ticket machines, Manaca automated turnstiles and is unattended.

=== Platforms ===
1	■ Toyota Line	For Toyotashi
2	■ Toyota Line	For Fushimi, Kami-Otai

== Station history ==
Miyoshigaoka Station was opened on July 29, 1979.

== Passenger statistics ==
In fiscal 2017, the station was used by an average of 9926 passengers daily.

== Surrounding area ==
- Tokai Gakuen University
- Toyota Sports Center
- Miyoshi Junior High School

== See also ==
- List of railway stations in Japan
