= Kami Toyota Station =

Railway station in Toyota, Aichi Prefecture, Japan

Kami Toyota Station 上豊田駅

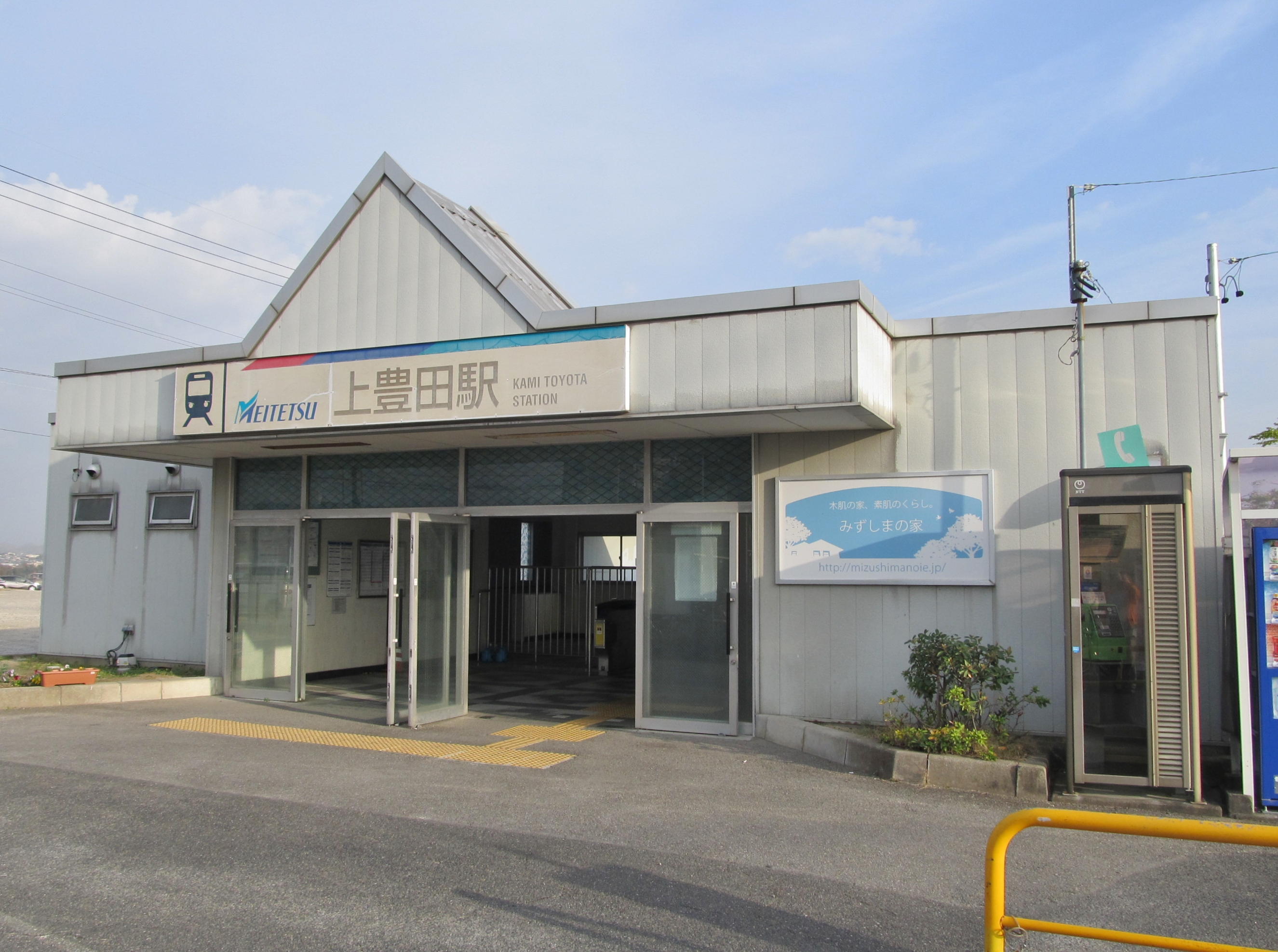
- Kami Toyota Station in December 2018

General information
- Location: Nishiyama Uwaharacho, Toyota-shi, Aichi-ken 470-0341; Japan
- Coordinates: 35.1159°N 137.1556°E
- Operator: Meitetsu
- Line: ■ Meitetsu Toyota Line
- Distance: 13.2 kilometers from Akaike
- Platforms: 2 side platforms

Other information
- Status: Unstaffed
- Station code: TT01
- Website: Official website

History
- Opened: 29 July 1979; 47 years ago

Passengers
- FY2017: 3,268

Services
Preceding station	Meitetsu	Following station
Jōsui towards Akaike	Toyota Line	Umetsubo towards Toyotashi
Location
- Location within Aichi Prefecture Location within Japan

Kami Toyota Station (上豊田駅, Kami Toyota-eki) is a train station in the city of Toyota, Aichi Prefecture, Japan, operated by Meitetsu.

== Lines ==
Kami Toyota Station is served by the Meitetsu Toyota Line, and is located 2.0 kilometers from the starting point of the line at Umetsubo and 13.2 kilometers from Akaike.

== Station layout ==
The station has two opposed side platforms, with the station building constructed underneath. The station has automated ticket machines, Manaca automated turnstiles and is unattended.

=== Platforms ===
1	■ Toyota Line	For Toyotashi
2	■ Toyota Line	For Fushimi, Kami-Otai

== Station history ==
Kami Toyota Station was opened on July 29, 1979. The station has been unattended since October 1, 2003.

== Passenger statistics ==
In fiscal 2017, the station was used by an average of 3,268 passengers daily.

== Surrounding area ==
- Toyota High School
- Umetsubodai Junior High School

== See also ==
- List of railway stations in Japan
