= Kurozasa Station =

Railway station in Miyoshi, Aichi Prefecture, Japan

Kurozasa Station 黒笹駅

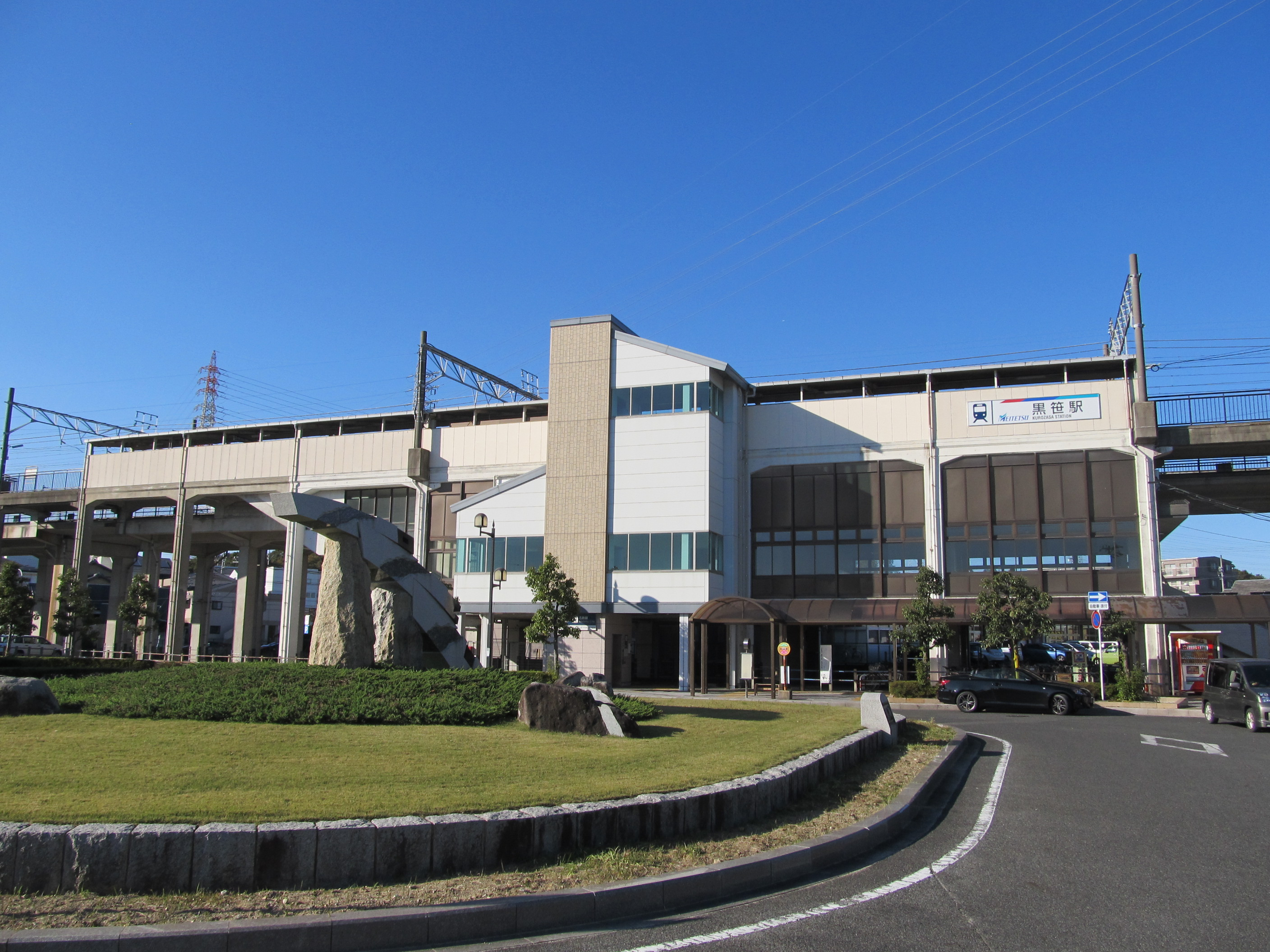
- Kurozasa Station, November 2018

General information
- Location: Kurozasacho, Miyoshi-shi, Aichi-ken 470-0201; Japan
- Coordinates: 35.1277°N 137.0912°E
- Operator: Meitetsu
- Line: ■ Meitetsu Toyota Line
- Distance: 27.5 kilometers from Kami-Otai
- Platforms: 2 side platforms

Other information
- Status: Unstaffed
- Station code: TT04
- Website: Official website

History
- Opened: 29 July 1979; 47 years ago

Passengers
- FY2017: 3103

Services
| Preceding station | Meitetsu | Following station |
|---|---|---|
| Komenoki towards Akaike | Toyota Line | Miyoshigaoka towards Toyotashi |
Location
- Location within Aichi Prefecture Location within Japan

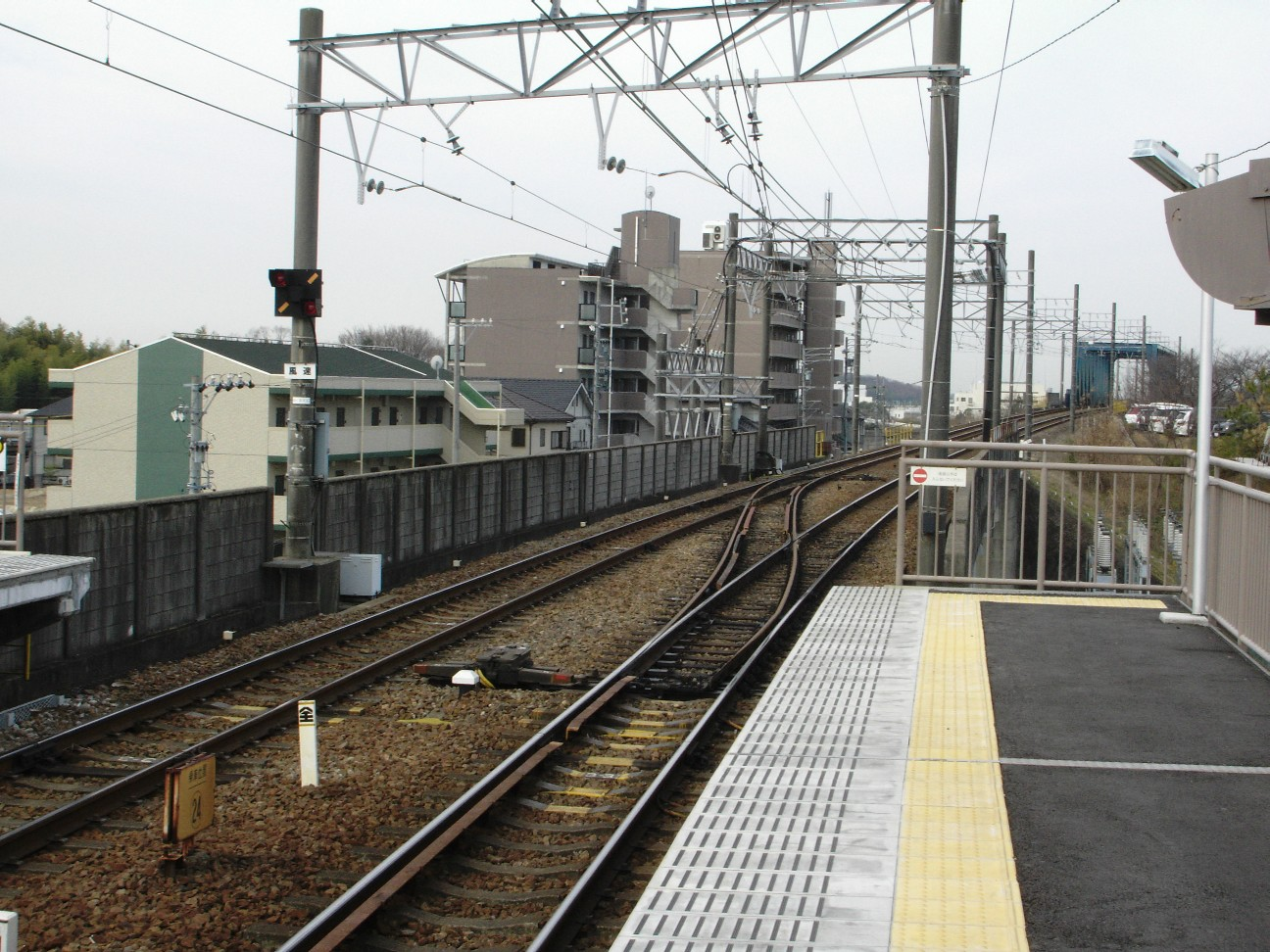
Platform

Kurozasa Station (黒笹駅, Kurozasa-eki) is a train station in the city of Miyoshi, Aichi Prefecture, Japan, operated by Meitetsu.

== Lines ==
Kurozasa Station is served by the Meitetsu Toyota Line, and is located 7.1 kilometers from the starting point of the line at Akaike and 27.5 kilometers from Kami-Otai.

== Station layout ==
The station has two elevated opposed side platforms with the station building underneath. The station has automated ticket machines, Manaca automated turnstiles and is unattended.

=== Platforms ===
| 1 | ■ Toyota Line | For Toyotashi |
| 2 | ■ Toyota Line | For Fushimi, Kami-Otai |

== Station history ==
Kurozasa Station was opened on July 29, 1979.

== Passenger statistics ==
In fiscal 2017, the station was used by an average of 3103 passengers daily.

== Surrounding area ==
- Kurozasa Elementary School

== See also ==
- List of railway stations in Japan
