= Komenoki Station =

Railway station in Nisshin, Aichi Prefecture, Japan

Komenoki Station 米野木駅

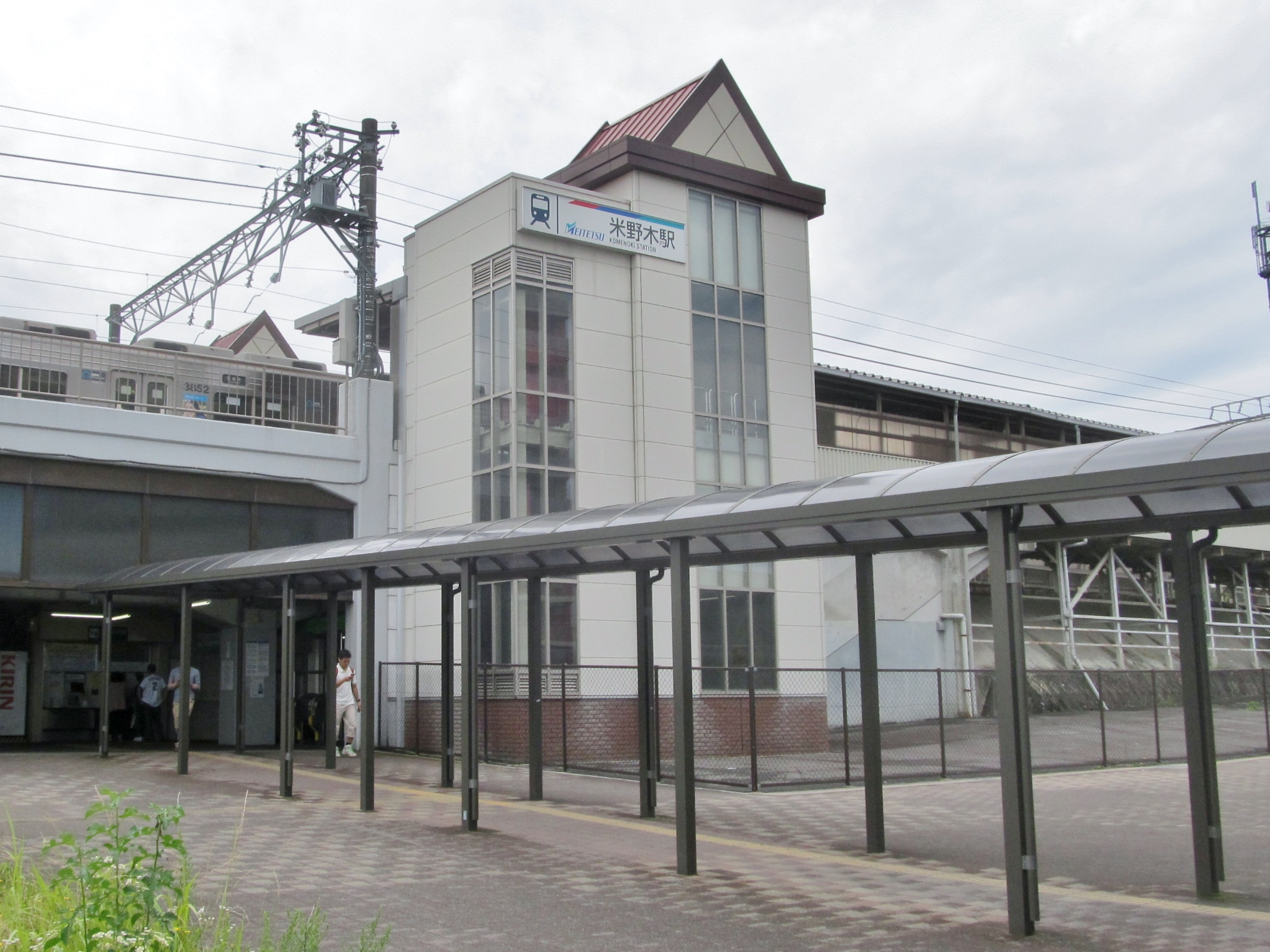
- Komenoki Station in June 2018

General information
- Location: Minamiyama-185-3 Komenokichō, Nisshin-shi, Aichi-ken 470-0111; Japan
- Coordinates: 35.1235°N 137.0670°E
- Operator: Meitetsu
- Line: ■ Meitetsu Toyota Line
- Distance: 25.2 kilometers from Kami-Otai
- Platforms: 2 side platforms

Other information
- Status: Unstaffed
- Station code: TT03
- Website: Official website

History
- Opened: 29 July 1979; 47 years ago

Passengers
- FY2017: 6103

Services
Preceding station	Meitetsu	Following station
Nisshin towards Akaike	Toyota Line	Kurozasa towards Toyotashi
Location
- Location within Aichi Prefecture Location within Japan

Komenoki Station (米野木駅, Komenoki-eki) is a train station in the city of Nisshin, Aichi Prefecture, Japan, operated by Meitetsu.

== Lines ==
Komenoki Station is served by the Meitetsu Toyota Line, and is located 4.8 kilometers from the starting point of the line at Akaike and 25.2 kilometers from Kami-Otai.

== Station layout ==
The station has two elevated opposed side platforms with the station building underneath. The station has automated ticket machines, Manaca automated turnstiles and is unattended.

=== Platforms ===
1	■ Toyota Line	For Toyotashi
2	■ Toyota Line	For Fushimi, Kami-Otai

== Station history ==
Komenoki Station was opened on 29 July 1979.

== Passenger statistics ==
In fiscal 2017, the station was used by an average of 6103 passengers daily.

== Surrounding area ==
- Nagoya University of Commerce & Business
- Nisshin High School
- Denso Engineering Center

== See also ==
- List of railway stations in Japan
