= Meitetsu 100 series =

Japanese train type

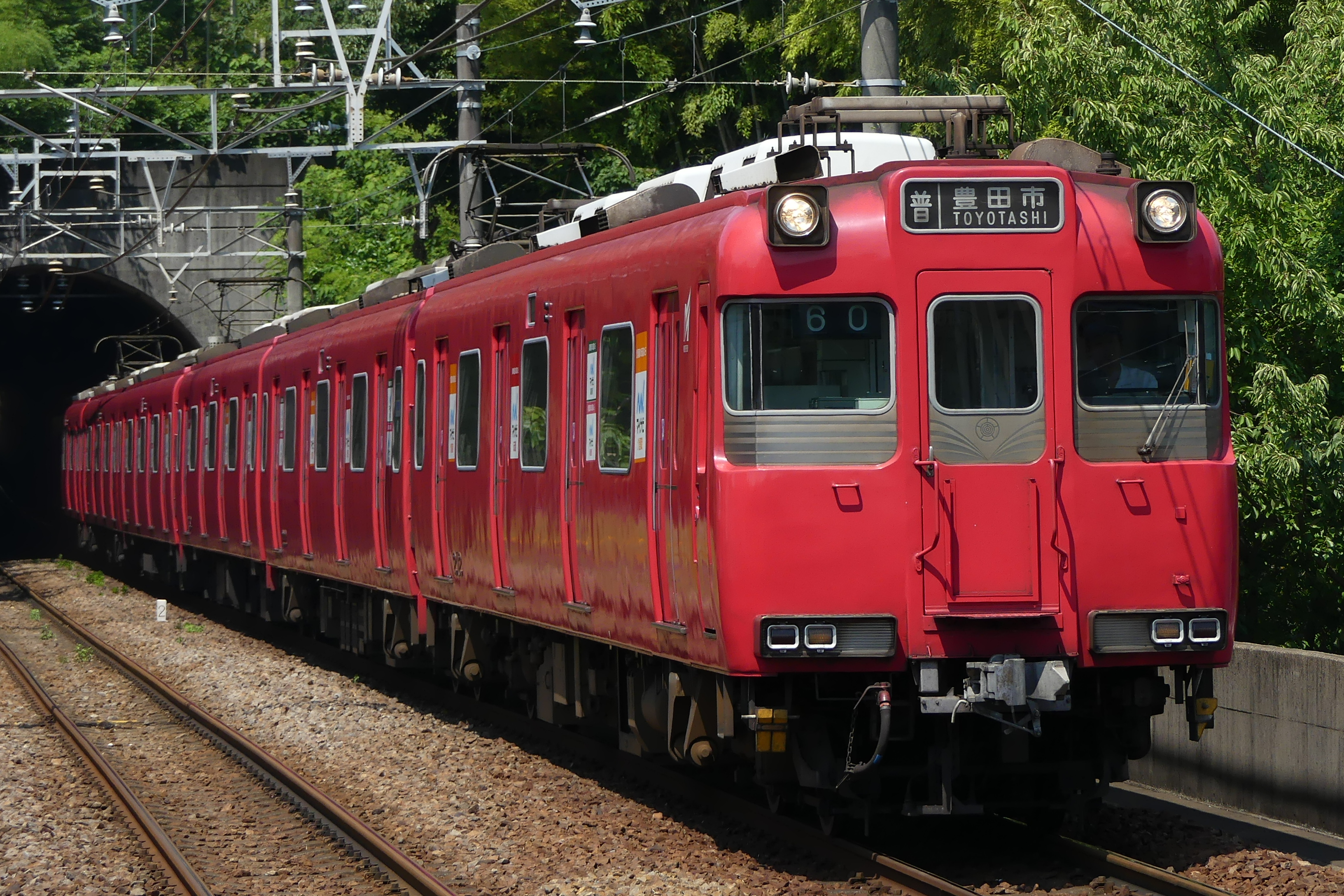
- Meitetsu 100 series Set on Toyota line in July 2018

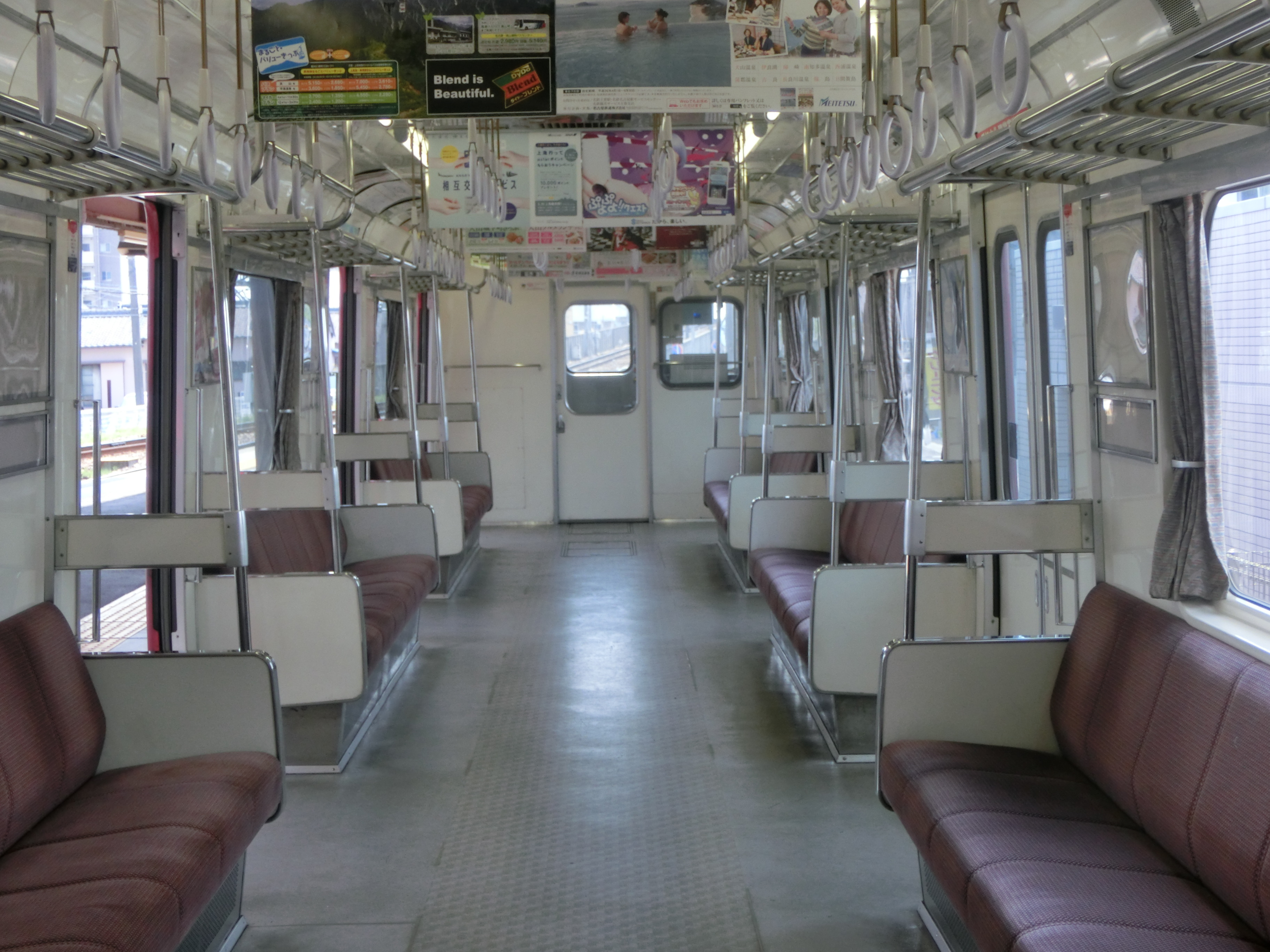
- Interior of a 100 series end car
- In service: 1979 - Present
- Manufacturer: Nippon Sharyo
- Constructed: 1978–1994
- Entered service: January 1979
- Refurbished: 2011-2013
- Number built: 66 cars (11 sets)
- Number in service: 66 cars (11 sets)
- Formation: 4 or 6 cars per trainset
- Operator: Nagoya Railroad
- Lines served: Inuyama Line; Toyota Line; Tsurumai Line

Specifications
- Traction system: Resistor control (1st, 2nd batch); Field system superimposed field excitation control (3rd, 4th batch); Variable frequency (GTO, IGBT) (5th batch onwards)
- Electric system: 1,500 V DC
- Current collection: Overhead catenary
- Bogies: Sumitomo Metal Industries; FS398A; FS39BA; SS126D; SS026D
- Safety system: Meitetsu ATS
- Track gauge: 1,067 mm (3 ft 6 in)

The Meitetsu 100 series (名鉄100系) is a commuter electric multiple unit type operated by Nagoya Railroad (Meitetsu) in Japan since 1978. There is also a 200 series type, operated since 1991, which is very similar to the 100 series. The 100 series and 200 series trains run on the Inuyama Line and Toyota Line and provide through service to the Tsurumai Line in Nagoya Municipal Subway.

== History ==
=== Background ===
In the 1950s, Toyota saw a surge in population thanks to its local car industry. Despite this increase, no railway connected Toyota to Nagoya, forcing local residents to use cars. The area around Nagoya suffered from frequent traffic congestions due to spike in automobile usage. After a proposal in 1972 proposing around 139 km of railway network around Nagoya including existing lines, Meitetsu gave away construction permits for the section between Yagoto and Akaike which was inherited from one of the railway companies Meitetsu absorbed to the Nagoya Municipal Subway, while also building the section between Akaike and Toyotashi Station. The two groups agreed to run through service from Toyotashi to Kami-Otai, which went through the Tsurumai Line and Meitetsu Toyota Line. The Meitetsu 100 series was designed for this through service.

=== Future ===
On 8 May 2025, Meitetsu announced its plans to replace the 100 series fleet with new 500 series trains from fiscal 2026.
