= Nisshin Station (Aichi) =

Railway station in Nisshin, Aichi Prefecture, Japan

Nisshin Station 日進駅

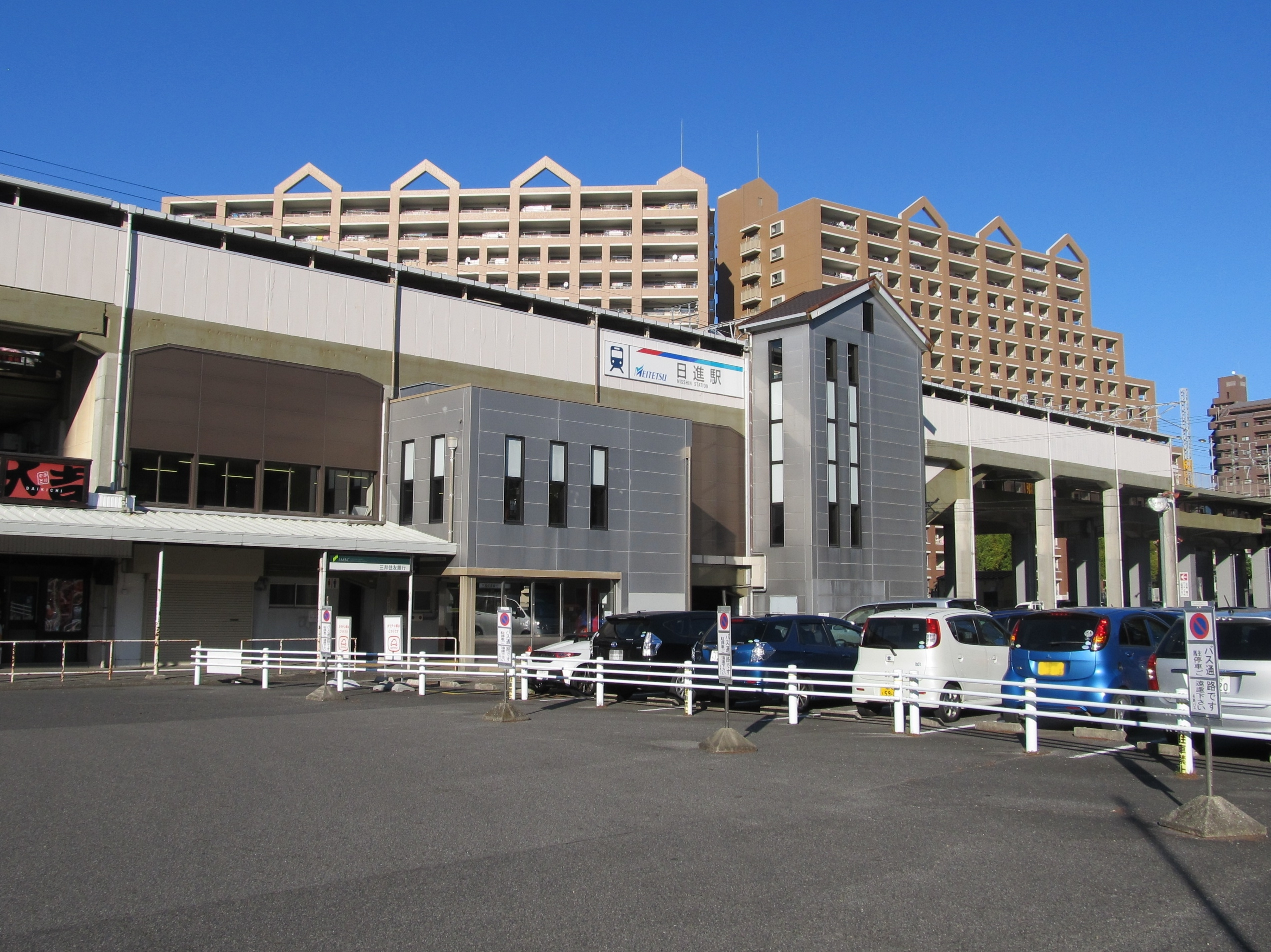
- Nisshin Station, November 2018

General information
- Location: 2-1708 Sakae, Nisshin-shi, Aichi-ken 470-0113; Japan
- Coordinates: 35.1184°N 137.049°E
- Operator: Meitetsu
- Line: ■ Meitetsu Toyota Line
- Distance: 23.4 kilometers from Kami-Otai
- Platforms: 2 side platforms

Other information
- Status: Staffed
- Station code: TT06
- Website: Official website

History
- Opened: 29 July 1979; 47 years ago

Passengers
- FY2017: 10,323

Services
Preceding station	Meitetsu	Following station
Akaike Terminus	Toyota Line	Komenoki towards Toyotashi
Location
- Location within Aichi Prefecture Location within Japan

Nisshin Station (日進駅, Nisshin-eki) is a train station in the city of Nisshin, Aichi Prefecture, Japan, operated by Meitetsu.

== Lines ==
Nisshin Station is served by the Meitetsu Toyota Line, and is located 3.0 kilometers from the starting point of the line at Akaike and 23.4 kilometers from Kami-Otai.

== Station layout ==
The station has two elevated opposed side platforms with the station building underneath. The station has automated ticket machines, Manaca automated turnstiles and is staffed.

=== Platforms ===
1	■ Toyota Line	For Toyotashi
2	■ Toyota Line	For Fushimi, Kami-Otai

== Station history ==
Nisshin Station was opened on 29 July 1979.

== Passenger statistics ==
In fiscal 2017, the station was used by an average of 10,323 passengers daily.

== Surrounding area ==
- Nishsin City Hall
- Nisshin Orido Hospital

== See also ==
- List of railway stations in Japan
