= Tōgō, Aichi =

Town in Aichi Prefecture, Japan

Tōgō 東郷町
- Town
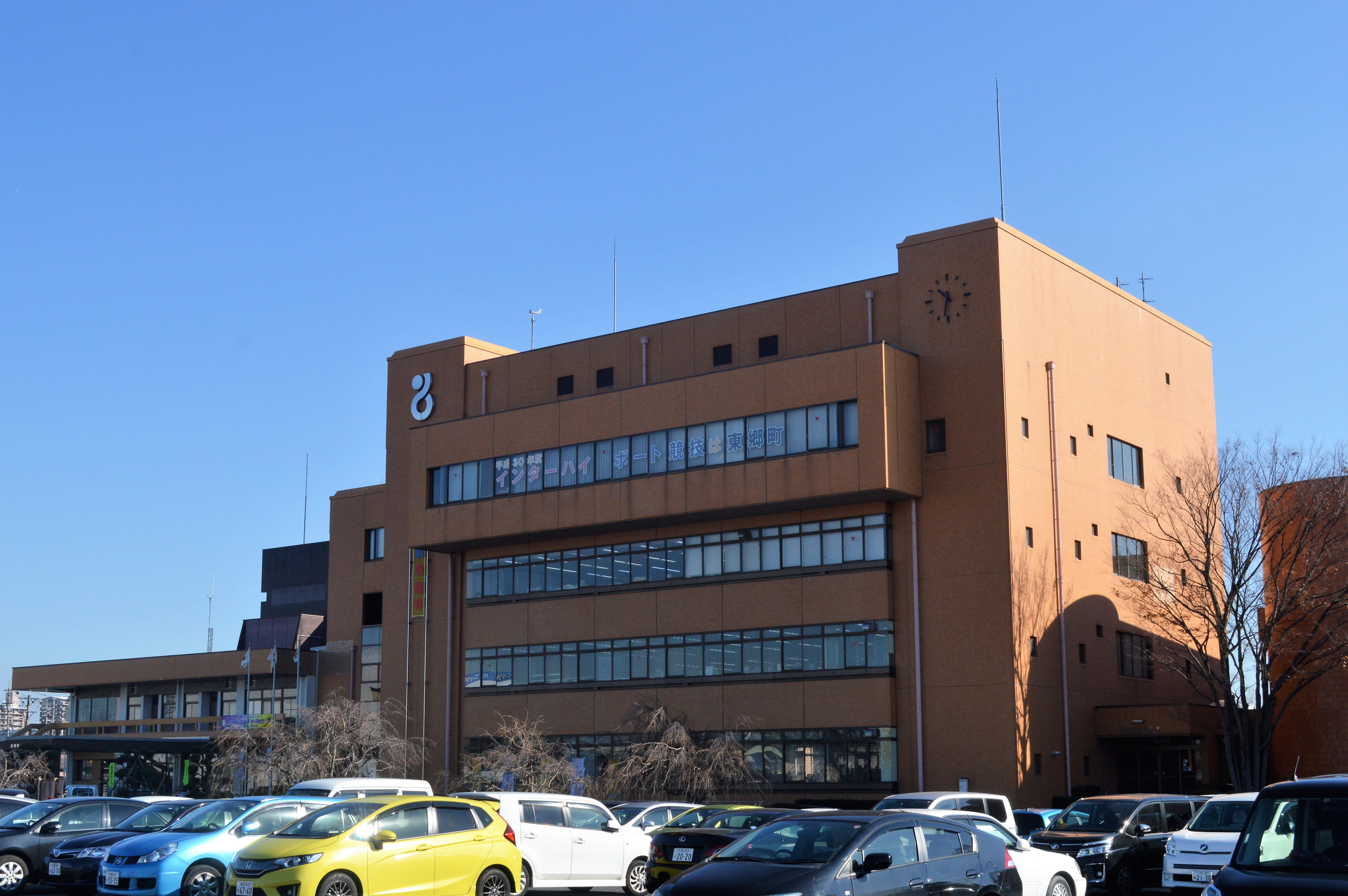
- Tōgō Town Office

- Flag Seal

- Location of Tōgō in Aichi Prefecture

- Coordinates: 35°05′47.9″N 137°03′9.1″E
- Country: Japan
- Region: Chūbu region Tōkai region
- Prefecture: Aichi
- District: Aichi

Area
  - Total: 18.03 km^{2} (6.96 sq mi)

Population (October 1, 2019)
  - Total: 44,109
  - Density: 2,446/km^{2} (6,336/sq mi)
- Time zone: UTC+9 (Japan Standard Time)
- Tree: Ternstroemia
- Flower: Siberian iris
- Phone number: 0561-38-3111
- Address: Tōgō-chō, Aichi-gun, Aichi-ken 470-0198
- Website: Official website

Tōgō (東郷町, Tōgō-chō) is a town located in Aichi District, Aichi Prefecture, Japan. As of 1 October 2019, the town had an estimated population of 44,109 in 17,792 households, and a population density of 2,446 persons per km^{2}. The total area of the town was 18.03 square kilometres (6.96 sq mi).

== Geography ==
Tōgō is located in approximately the geographic center of Aichi Prefecture, immediately to the east of the Nagoya metropolis. The area is noted for a number of golf courses, including the Nagoya Golf Club's Wago Course, which hosts The Crowns golf tournament.

=== Neighboring municipalities ===
- Aichi Prefecture
  - Kariya
  - Miyoshi
  - Nagoya – Midori-ku
  - Nisshin
  - Toyoake

== Demographics ==
Per Japanese census data, the population of Tōgō has been increasing rapidly over the past 70 years.

Historical population
Year	Pop.	±%
1940	4,241	—
1950	5,469	+29.0%
1960	6,200	+13.4%
1970	11,509	+85.6%
1980	22,125	+92.2%
1990	30,446	+37.6%
2000	36,878	+21.1%
2010	41,823	+13.4%

=== Climate ===
The town has a climate characterized by characterized by hot and humid summers, and relatively mild winters (Köppen climate classification Cfa). The average annual temperature in Tōgō is 15.7 °C. The average annual rainfall is 1593 mm with September as the wettest month. The temperatures are highest on average in August, at around 28.0 °C, and lowest in January, at around 4.2 °C.

== History ==
The villages of Morowa and Haruki were established within Aichi District, Aichi with the establishment of the modern municipalities system on October 1, 1889. The town villages merged on May 10, 1906, to form the village of Tōgō. It was elevated to town status on April 1, 1970.

== Economy ==
Tōgō is largely a regional commercial center with some light manufacturing industry. Due to its proximity to the Nagoya metropolis, it is increasingly becoming a commuter town.

== Education ==
Tōgō has six public elementary schools and three public junior high schools operated by the town government and one public high school operated by the Aichi Prefectural Board of Education. The town also has one private high school.

== Transportation ==
=== Railway ===
- Tōgō does not have any passenger railway service. The nearest train station is Komenoki Station on the Meitetsu Toyota Line in the neighboring city of Nisshin.

=== Highway ===
- National Route 153

== Local attractions ==
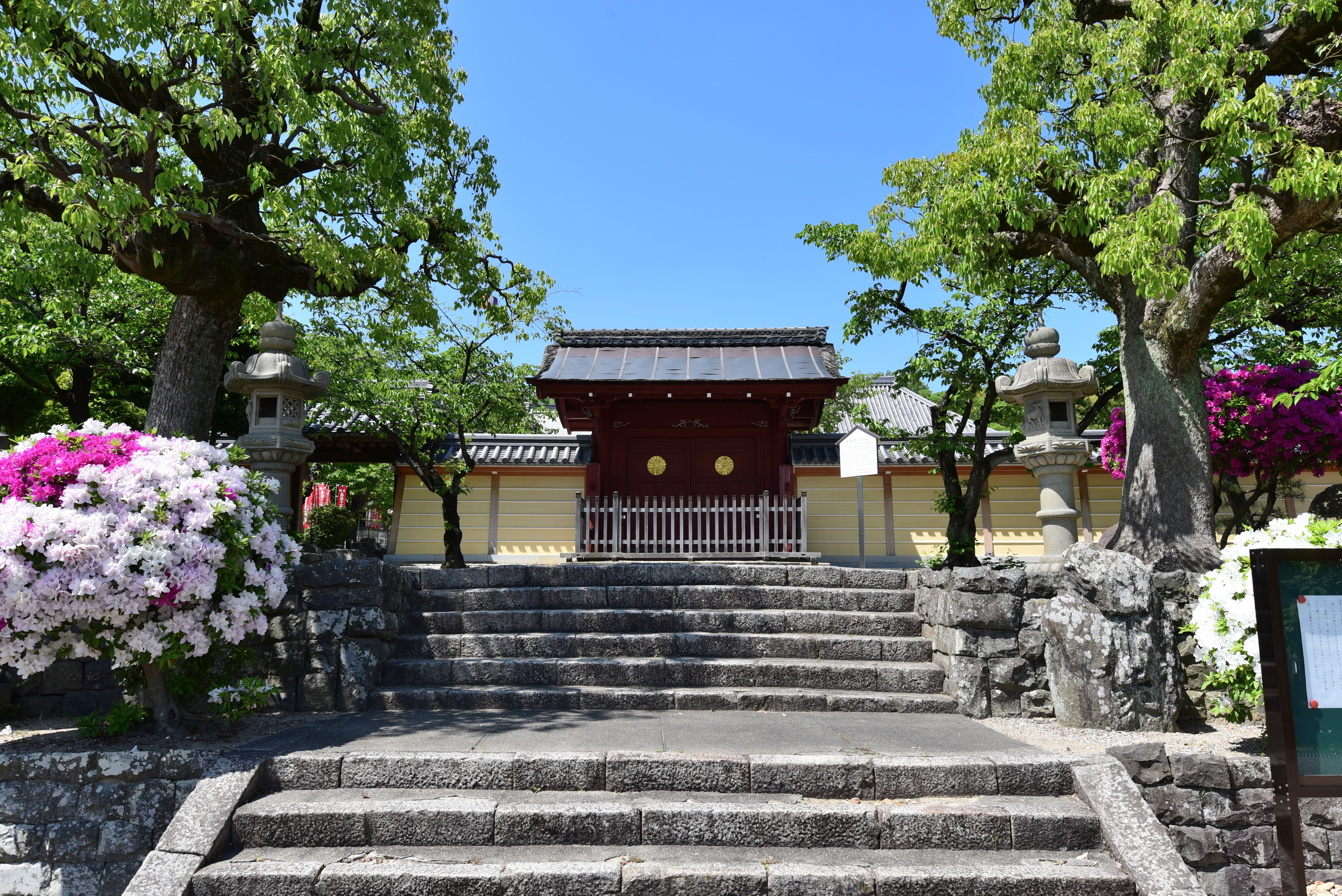
Yufuku-ji temple

- Kurozasa Nana-go-Kama Kiln
- Yufuku-ji temple

== Noted people from Tōgō ==
- Stephanie Mawuli, basketball player
- Jiro Sato, actor
- Yoshi-Hashi, professional wrestler (Real Name: Nobuo Yoshihashi, Nihongo: 吉橋 伸雄, Yoshihashi Nobuo)
