= Umetsubo Station =

Railway station in Toyota, Aichi Prefecture, Japan

Umetsubo Station 梅坪駅

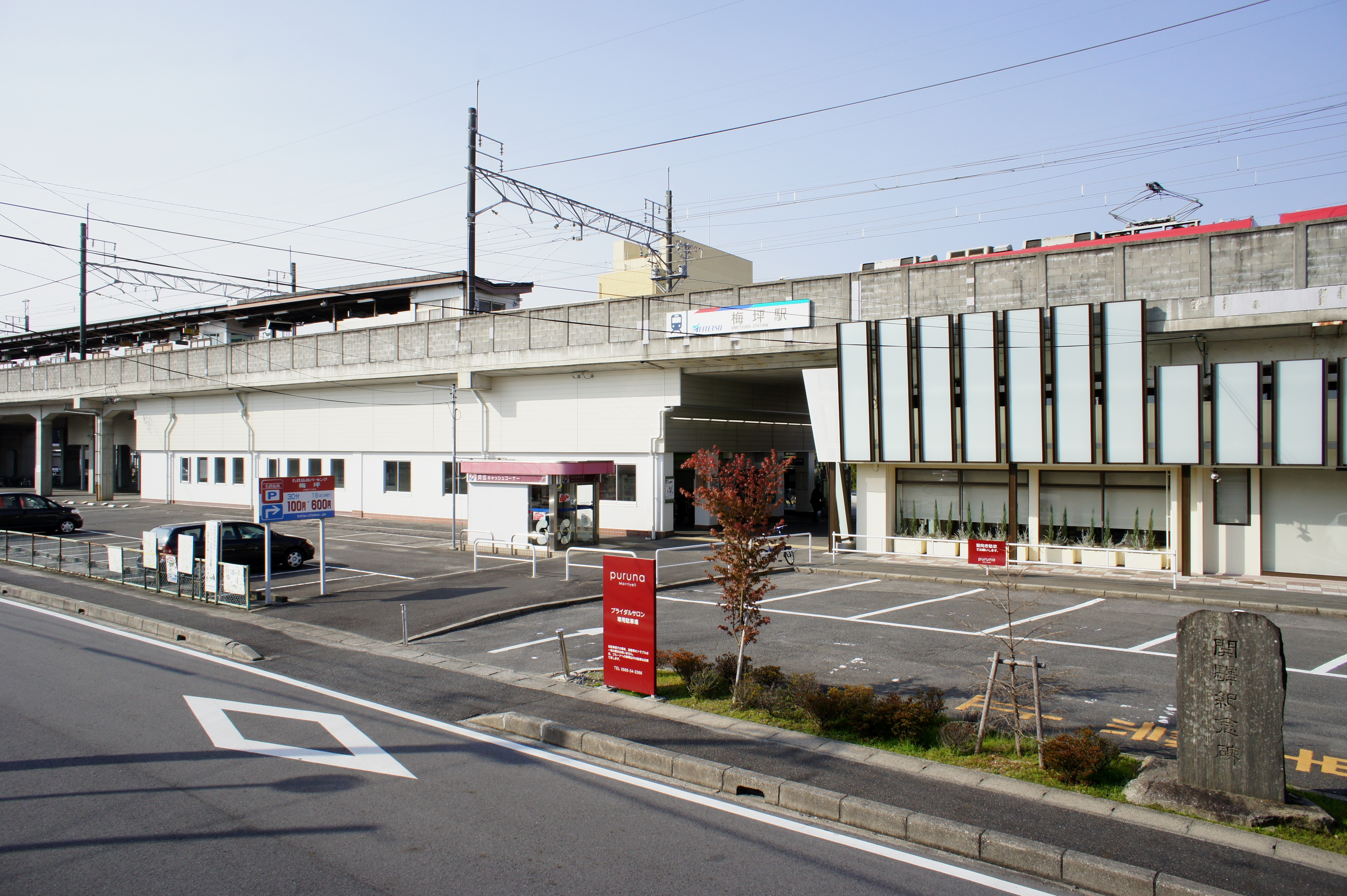
- Umetsubo Station in October 2010

General information
- Location: 7-125 Umetsubochō, Toyota-shi, Aichi-ken 471-0064; Japan
- Coordinates: 35.1002°N 137.1620°E
- Operator: Meitetsu
- Lines: ■ Meitetsu Mikawa Line; ■ Meitetsu Toyota Line
- Distance: 18.4 kilometers from Chiryū
- Platforms: 1 island platform

Other information
- Status: Unstaffed
- Station code: MY08
- Website: Official website

History
- Opened: 26 October 1923; 102 years ago

Passengers
- FY2017: 6424 daily

Services
Preceding station	Meitetsu	Following station
Koshido towards Sanage	Mikawa Line Sanage–Chiryū	Toyotashi towards Chiryū
Kami Toyota towards Akaike	Toyota Line	Toyotashi Terminus
Location
- Location within Aichi Prefecture Location within Japan

Umetsubo Station (梅坪駅, Umetsubo-eki) is a junction railway station in the city of Toyota, Aichi, Japan, operated by Meitetsu.

== Lines ==
Umetsubo Station is served by the Meitetsu Mikawa Line and is 18.4 km (11.4 mi) from the terminus of the line at Chiryū Station. It is also the nominal terminus of the Meitetsu Toyota Line and is 15.2 kilometres from Akaike Station.

== Station layout ==
The station has a single elevated island platform with the station building located underneath. The station has automated ticket machines, Manaca automated turnstiles and is unattended.

=== Platforms ===
1	■ Mikawa Line	For Sanage
	■ Toyota Line	For Akaike, Fushimi, and Kami Otai
2	■ Toyota Line	Toyotashi, and Chiryū

== Station history ==
Umetsubo Station was opened on October 26, 1923, as a station on the privately owned Mikawa Railway. The Mikawa Railway was merged with Meitetsu on June 1, 1941. On July 29, 1979, the Toyota Line began operations to this station. Umetsubo Station has been unattended since October 1, 2003.

== Passenger statistics ==
In fiscal 2017, the station was used by an average of 6424 passengers daily.

== Surrounding area ==
- Toyota Technical High School
- Japan National Route 153

== See also ==
- List of railway stations in Japan
- Aikan-Umetsubo Station
