= Koshido Station =

Railway station in Toyota, Aichi Prefecture, Japan

Koshido Station 越戸駅

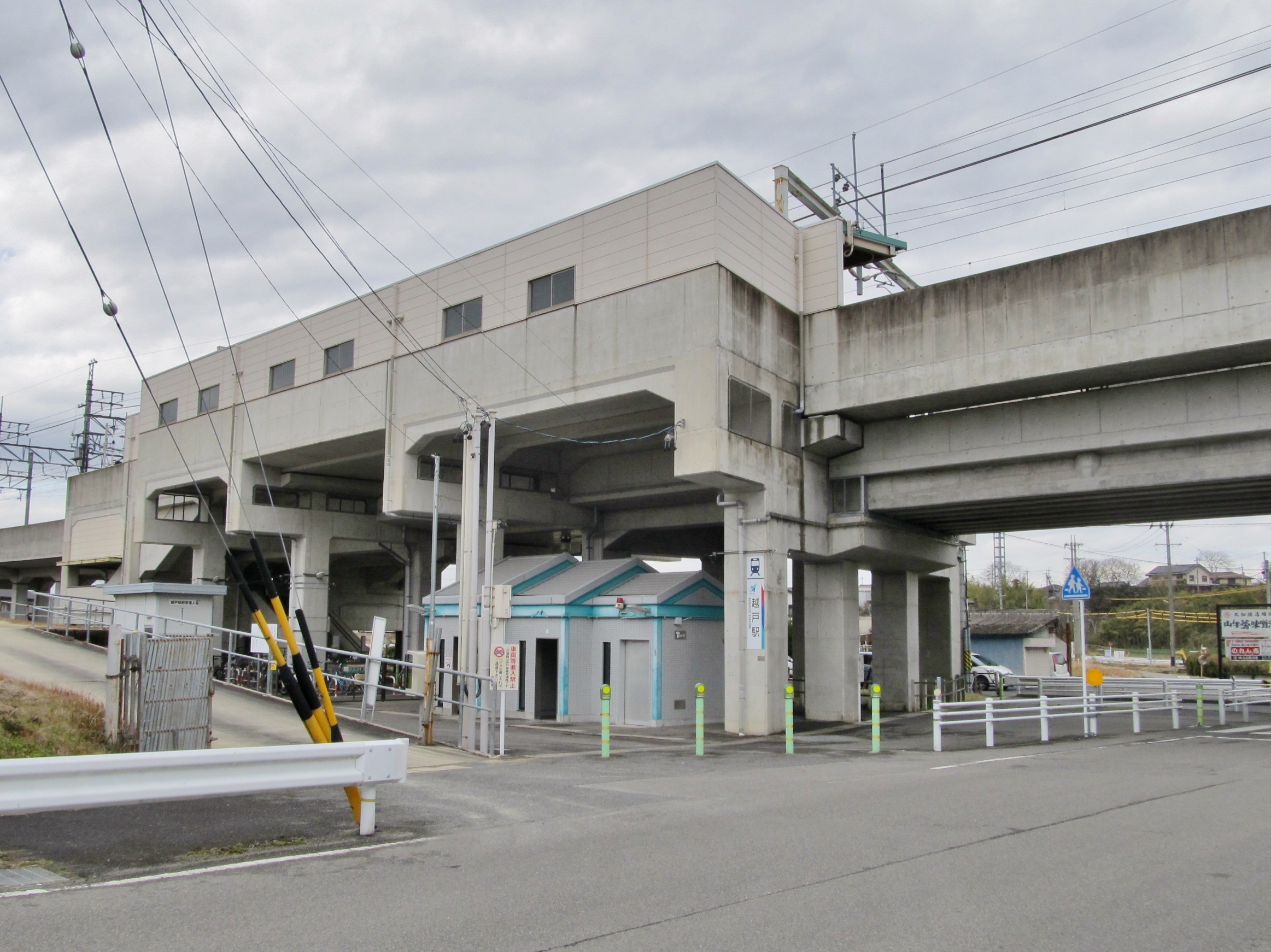
- Koshido Station in February 2019

General information
- Location: Umemori-4 Koshidochō, Toyota-shi, Aichi-ken 470-0332; Japan
- Coordinates: 35.1075°N 137.1802°E
- Operator: Meitetsu
- Line: ■ Meitetsu Mikawa Line
- Distance: 19.1 kilometers from Chiryū
- Platforms: 2 side platforms

Other information
- Status: Unstaffed
- Station code: MY09
- Website: Official website

History
- Opened: 5 July 1920; 106 years ago

Passengers
- FY2017: 897 daily

Services
Preceding station	Meitetsu	Following station
Hiratobashi towards Sanage	Mikawa Line Sanage–Chiryū	Umetsubo towards Chiryū
Location
- Location within Aichi Prefecture Location within Japan

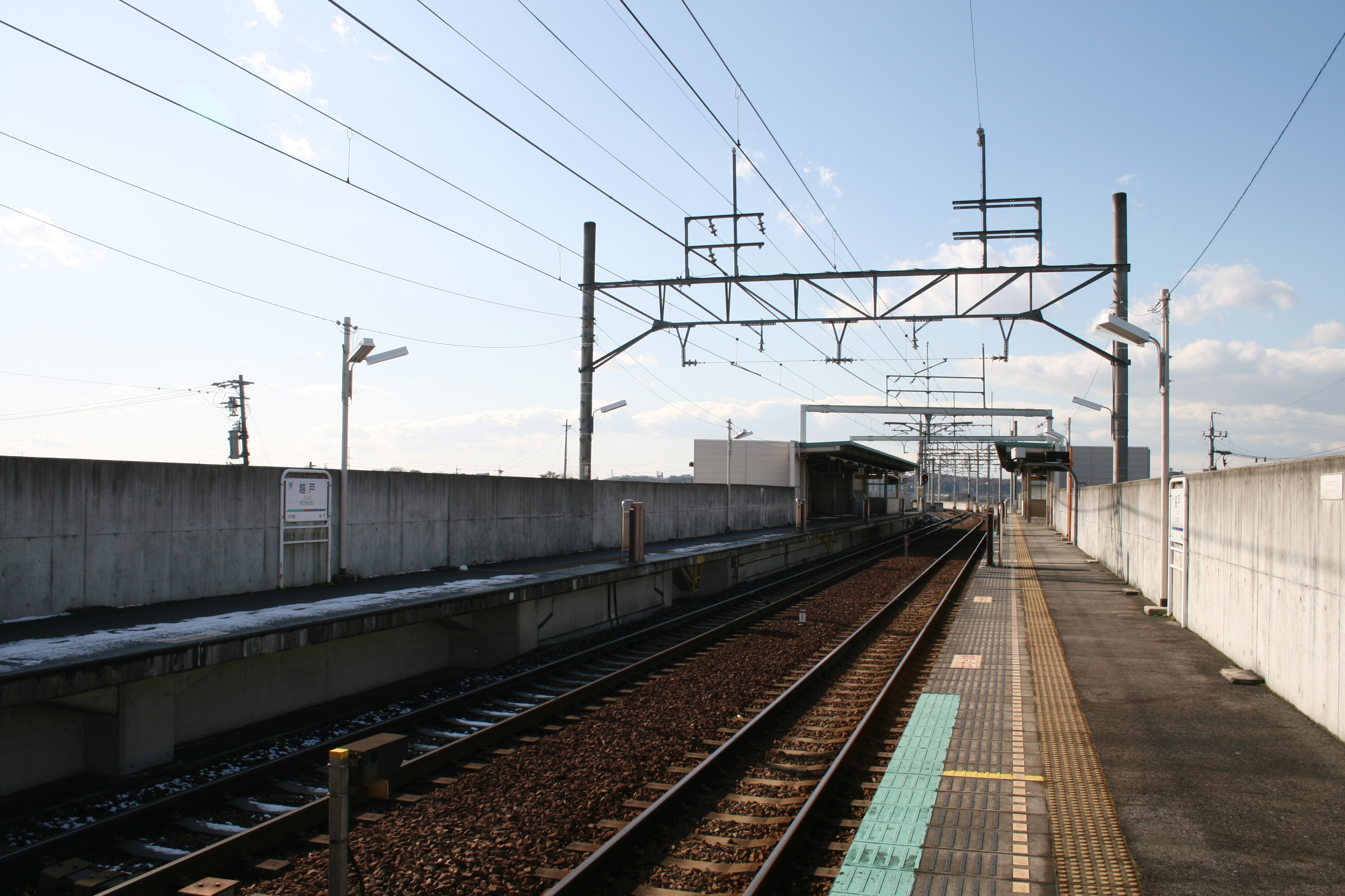
Platforms

Track Layout

Koshido Station (越戸駅, Koshido-eki) is a railway station in the city of Toyota, Aichi, Japan, operated by Meitetsu.

== Lines ==
Koshido Station is served by the Meitetsu Mikawa Line and is 19.1 km (11.9 mi) from the terminus of the line at Chiryū Station.

== Station layout ==
The station has two opposed elevated side platforms with the station building underneath. The station has automated ticket machines, Manaca automated turnstiles and is staffed.

=== Platforms ===
1	■ Mikawa Line	ForToyotashi and Sanage
2	■ Mikawa Line	For Chiryū and Meitetsu-Nagoya

== Station history ==
Koshido Station was opened on January 17, 1922, as a station on the privately owned Mikawa Railway. The Mikawa Railway was merged with Meitetsu on June 1, 1941. The station has been unattended since 1970. The tracks were elevated in December 2000 and a new station building was completed at that time.

== Passenger statistics ==
In fiscal 2017, the station was used by an average of 897 passengers daily.

== Surrounding area ==
- Japan National Route 153
- site of Koshido mines

== See also ==
- List of railway stations in Japan
