= Meitetsu 500 series =

Japanese electric multiple unit train type

- Manufacturer: Nippon Sharyo
- Replaced: 100 series
- Entered service: Planned for fiscal 2026
- Number built: 6 vehicles (1 set)
- Formation: 6 cars per trainset
- Operator: Meitetsu
- Lines served: Inuyama Line; Toyota Line; Tsurumai Line

Specifications
- Car length: 20,000 mm (65 ft 7 in)
- Doors: 4 per side

The Meitetsu 500 series (Japanese: 名鉄500系) is a commuter electric multiple unit (EMU) train type on order by the private railway operator Nagoya Railroad (Meitetsu) for use on Toyota and Inuyama Line services, as well as through services onto the Tsurumai Line of the Nagoya Municipal Subway, in Japan.

== Background ==
The 500 series was developed as a successor for the 100 series, which has been used on Tsurumai Line through services since the Meitetsu Toyota Line opened in 1979. As of 2022, the 100 series was one of the oldest privately operated train types in Japan to be used on subway line through services.

== Design ==
Cars will be 20 metres (66 ft) long and have four doors per side. The 500 series will have similar performance specifications to that of the 9500 series.

The trains are planned to use a silicon carbide-based variable-frequency traction system, offering 35% energy savings over the 100 series.

Internally, all cars are planned to provide priority seating and wheelchair spaces.

== Operations ==
The trains are planned for use on Toyota and Inuyama Line services, as well as through services on the Nagoya Municipal Subway Tsurumai Line.

== History ==
Details of the 500 series were first announced by Meitetsu on 8 May 2025. The first set, 511, was delivered from Nippon Sharyo in November 2026. The type is scheduled to enter revenue service in fiscal year 2026.
