= Miyoshi, Aichi =

Miyoshi みよし市
- City
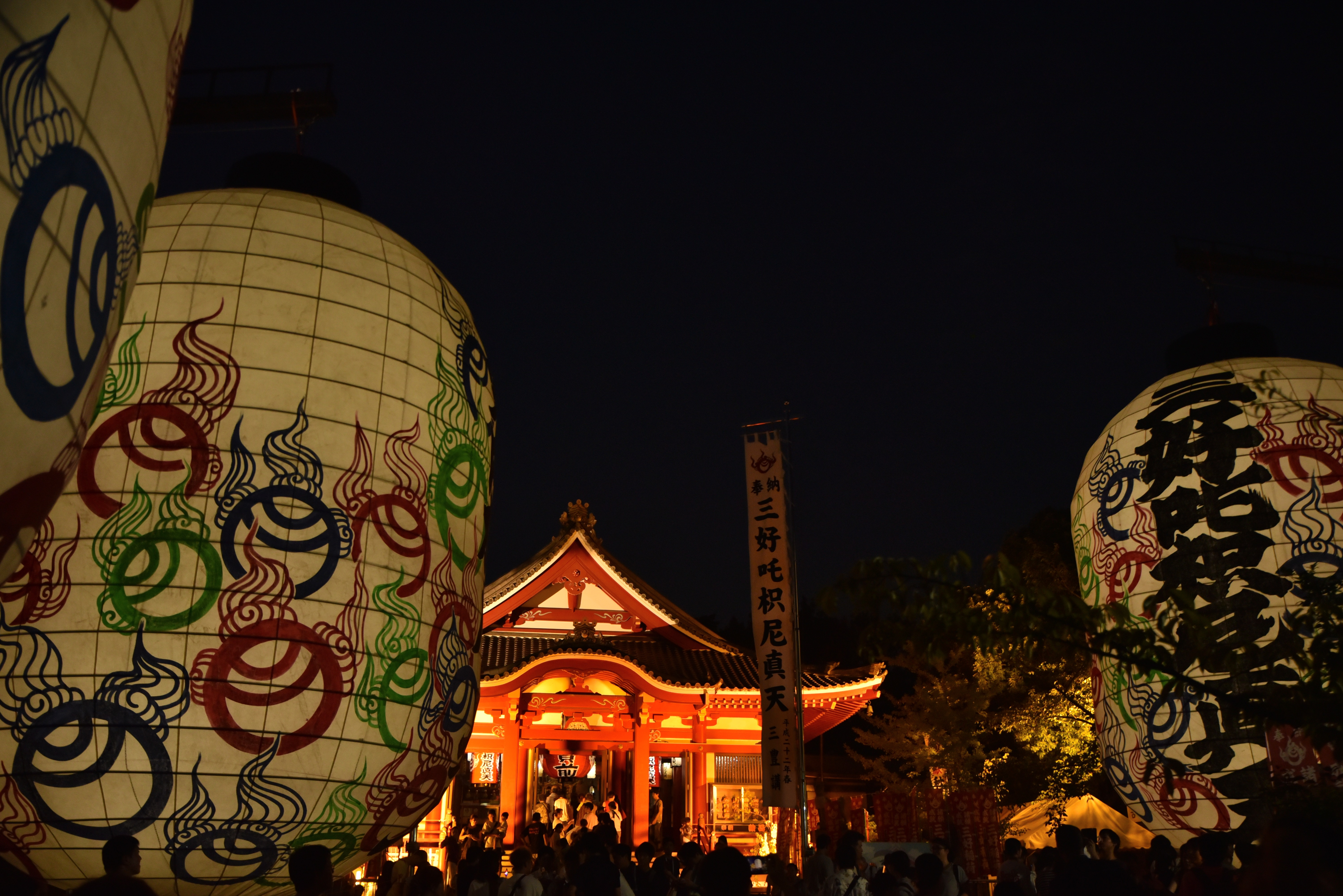
- Miyoshi Daichochin Matsuri

- Flag Seal

- Location of Miyoshi in Aichi Prefecture

- Coordinates: 35°5′22″N 137°4′29.4″E
- Country: Japan
- Region: Chūbu (Tōkai)
- Prefecture: Aichi

Area
  - Total: 32.19 km^{2} (12.43 sq mi)

Population (October 1, 2019)
  - Total: 62,782
  - Density: 1,950/km^{2} (5,051/sq mi)
- Time zone: UTC+9 (Japan Standard Time)
  - Tree: Pinus thunbergii
  - Flower: Satsuki azalea
- Phone number: 0561-32-2111
- Address: Kozaka 50-banchi, Miyoshi-shi, Aichi-ken 470-0295
- Website: Official website

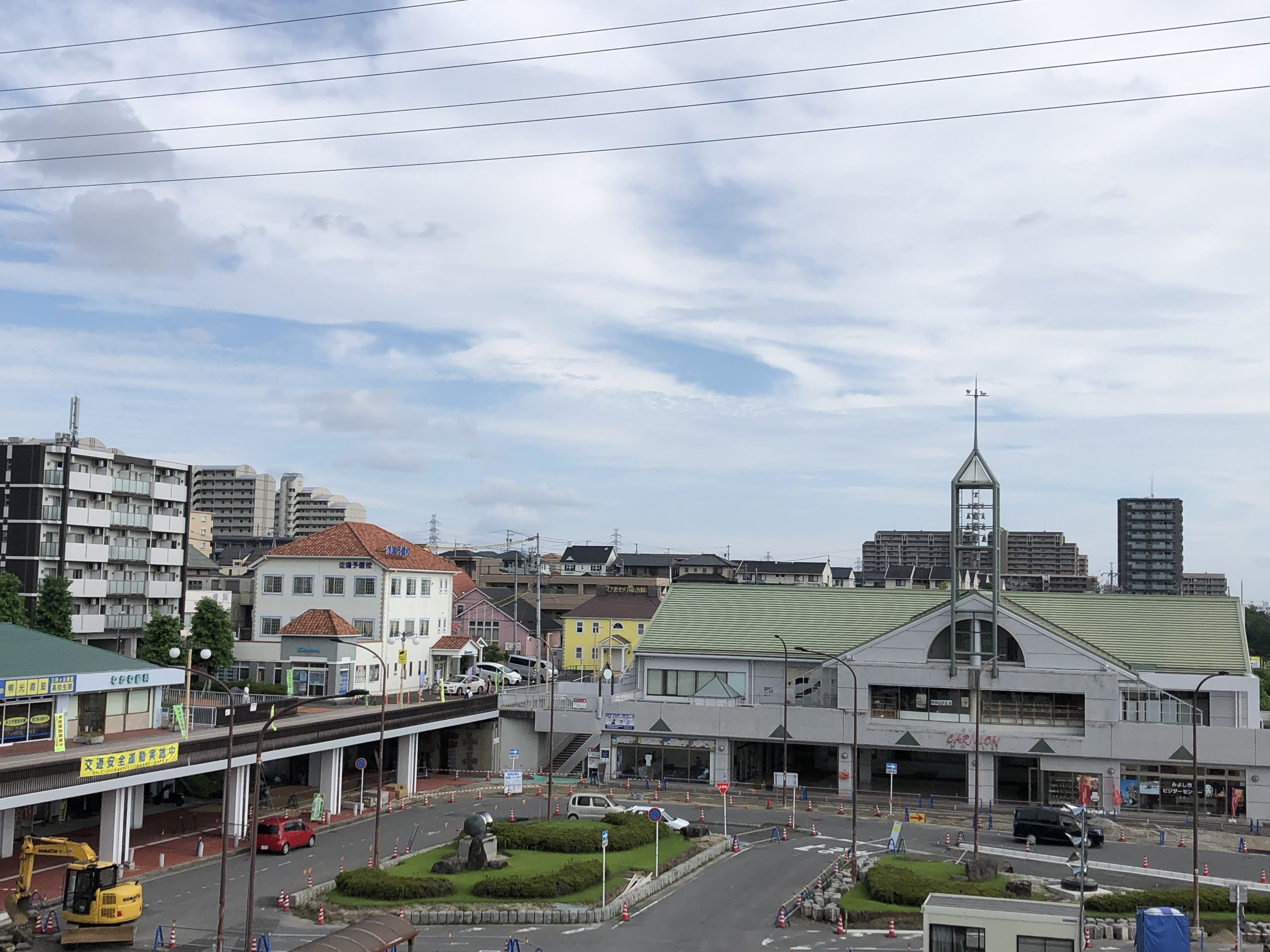
Skyline of Miyoshi City

Miyoshi (みよし市, Miyoshi-shi) is a city located in central Aichi Prefecture, Japan. As of 1 October 2019, the city had an estimated population of 62,782 in 24,260 households, and a population density of 1,950 persons per km^{2}. The total area of the city was 32.19 square kilometres (12.43 sq mi).

== Geography ==
Miysohi is situated in central Aichi Prefecture.

=== Climate ===
The city has a climate characterized by hot and humid summers, and relatively mild winters (Köppen climate classification Cfa). The average annual temperature in Miyoshi is 15.7 °C. The average annual rainfall is 1598 mm with September as the wettest month. The temperatures are highest on average in August, at around 28.08 °C, and lowest in January, at around 4.1 °C.

=== Demographics ===
Per Japanese census data, the population of Miyoshi has grown drastically over the past 60 years.

Historical population
Year	Pop.	±%
1940	6,833	—
1950	9,372	+37.2%
1960	9,161	−2.3%
1970	19,734	+115.4%
1980	28,522	+44.5%
1990	32,241	+13.0%
2000	47,684	+47.9%
2010	60,099	+26.0%

=== Neighboring municipalities ===
Aichi Prefecture

- Kariya
- Nisshin
- Tōgō
- Toyota

== History ==
=== Early modern period ===
“Miyoshi" as a local place name appears in documents in the Edo period.

=== Late modern period ===
Miyoshi Village was created within Nishikamo District, Aichi Prefecture on October 1, 1889, with the establishment of the modern municipalities system in the early Meiji period.

=== Contemporary history ===
Miyoshi merged with neighboring villages in 1906 to reach its present geographic borders and was raised to town status on April 1, 1958.

During 2003–2005, discussions were held to merge Miyoshi with the city of Toyota, but the merger proposal was strongly opposed by the majority of the inhabitants of Miyoshi.

As a result, the merger did not take place, and instead Miyoshi was elevated to city status on January 4, 2010.

With its change in status, Miyoshi changed the spelling of its name from kanji (三好) to hiragana (みよし)

== Government ==
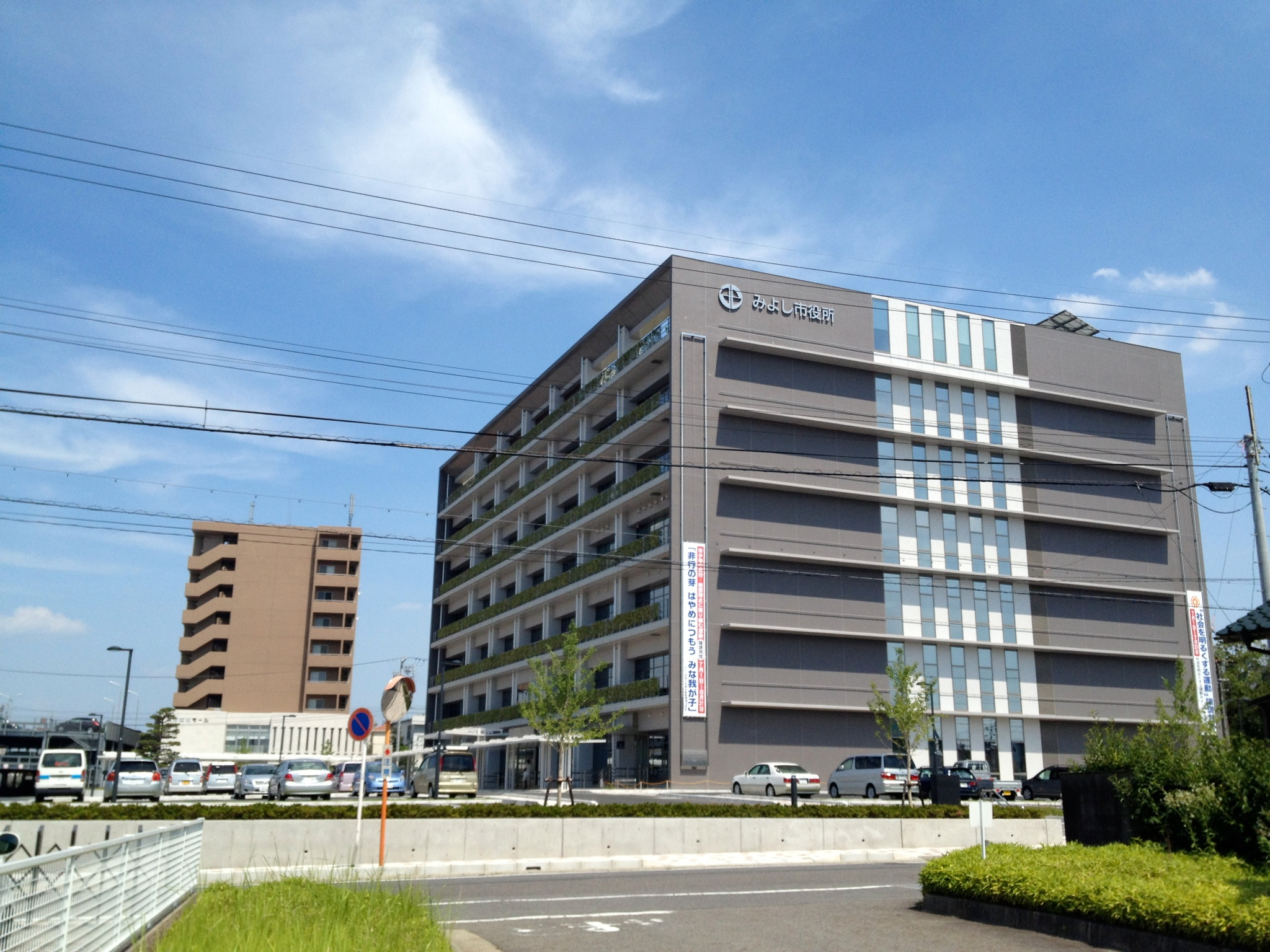
Miyoshi city hall

Miyoshi has a mayor-council form of government with a directly elected mayor and a unicameral city legislature of 20 members. The city contributes one member to the Aichi Prefectural Assembly. In terms of national politics, the city is part of Aichi District 11 of the lower house of the Diet of Japan.

== Sister cities ==
=== International ===
Friendship city

- Columbus, Indiana, United States, since February 16, 1995

==== National ====
Friendship city

- (Japan) Shibetsu, Kamikawa Subprefecture, Hokkaido, since October 6, 2000
- (Japan) Kiso, Nagano Prefecture, since October 14, 1983

== Economy ==
Miyoshi is a regional commercial center, and has a very industrial economy, with many factories producing automobiles or automotive-related components, mostly connected with Toyota Corporation. Residual agriculture is mostly horticulture

== Education ==
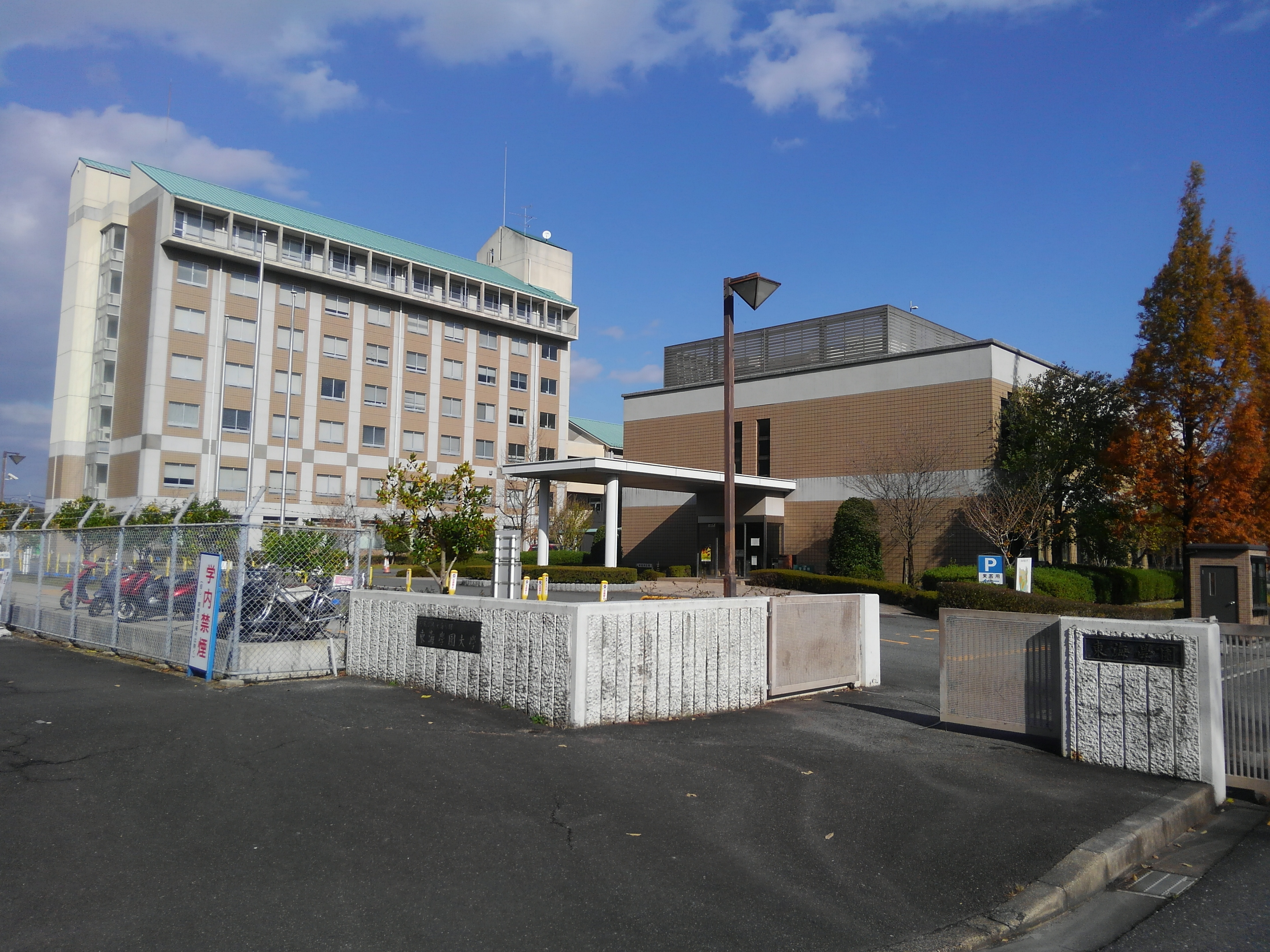
Tokai Gakuen University

=== University ===
- Tokai Gakuen University

=== Schools ===
- Miyoshi has eight public elementary schools and four public junior high schools operated by the city government, and one public high school operated by the Aichi Prefectural Board of Education. The prefecture also operates one special education school for the handicapped.

== Transportation ==
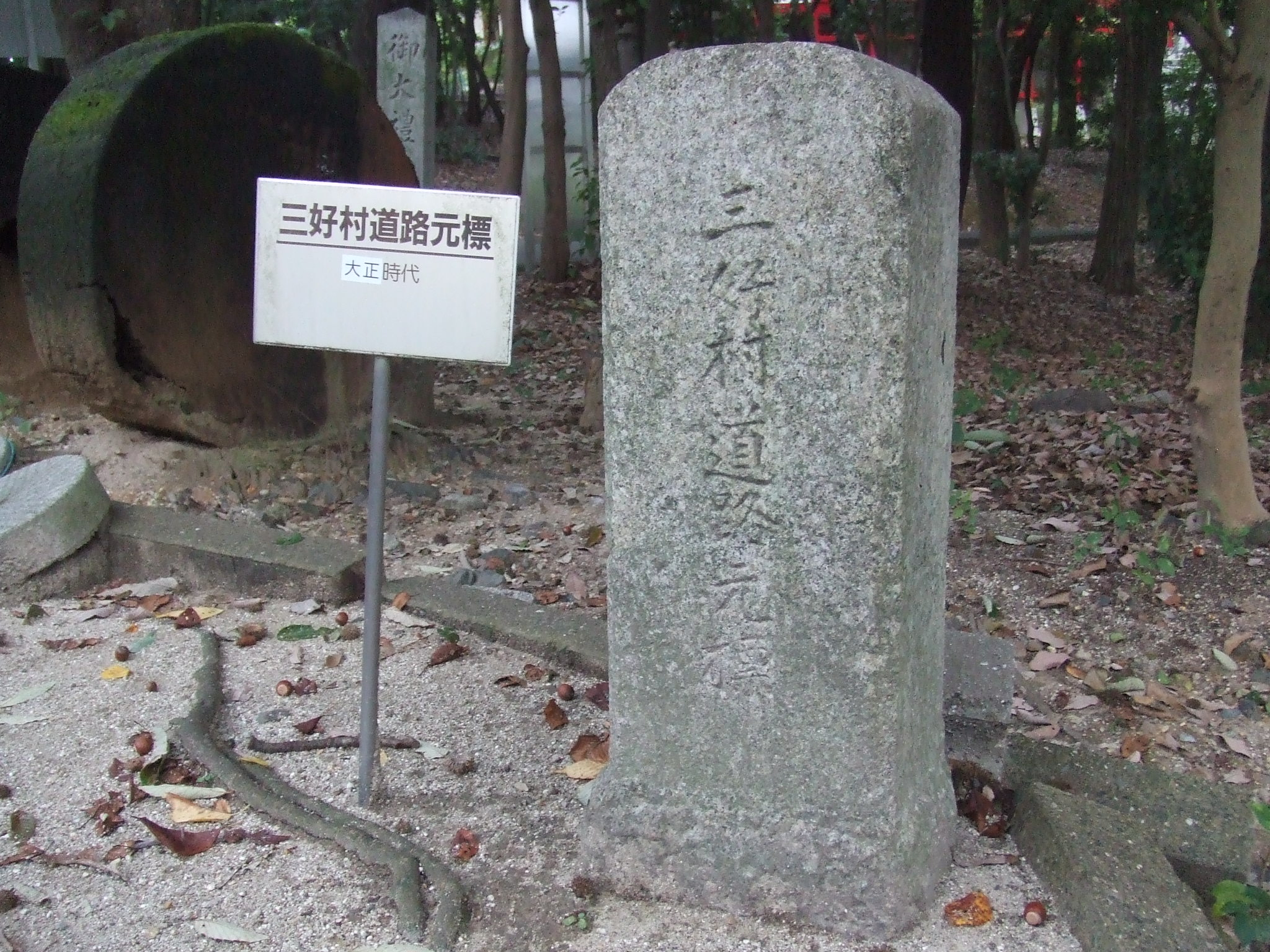
The Kilometre Zero of Miyoshi

=== Railways ===
==== Conventional lines ====
Meitetsu

- Toyota Line: - Miyoshigaoka – Kurozasa –

=== Roads ===
==== Expressway ====
- Tōmei Expressway
  - Tōmei-Miyoshi IC –

==== Japan National Route ====
- National Route 153

== Notable people from Miyoshi ==
- Tomoko Ohta (born 1933), scientist known for the nearly neutral theory of evolution
- Hitomi Yoshizawa, former leader of J-Pop Girlgroup Morning Musume, soloist in Hello!Project
