= Nisshin Station =

Nisshin Station may refer to either of the following railway stations in Japan:

- Nisshin Station (Aichi) on the Meitetsu Toyota Line
- Nisshin Station (Saitama) on the Kawagoe Line
- Nisshin Station (Hokkaidō) on the Sōya Main Line
