= Aichi District =

District in Aichi prefecture, Japan

Coordinates: 35.15°N 137.05°E

Map of Aichi District in Aichi Prefecture

Aichi (愛知郡, Aichi-gun) is a rural district located just east of Nagoya in central western Aichi Prefecture, Japan.

As of October 1, 2019, the district had an estimated population of 44,109 with a density of 2,446 persons per km^{2}. Its total area was 18.03 km^{2}.

== Municipalities ==
The district consists of one town:

- Tōgō (Note: Classified as a town.)

== History ==
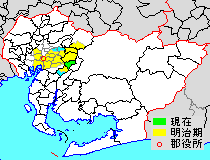
Map showing original extent of Aichi District in Aichi Prefecture: * yellow - areas formerly within the district borders during the early Meiji period: 1. Tōgō-machi

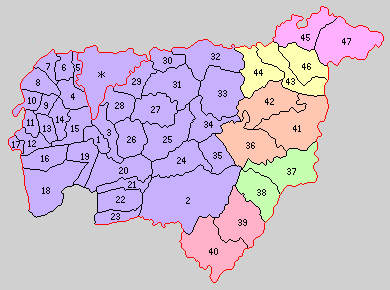
Colored areas are in this district.

Aichi District was one of the ancient subdivisions of Owari Province, and its name (under a variety of spellings) appears in Nara period records and artifacts recovered from the ruins of Heijō-kyō Palace. It was occasionally referred to as "Ayuchi" (年魚市、年魚道、吾湯市、阿由知、阿育知), although the present name appears to have become standard after the middle of the Edo period. During the Sengoku period, this area was the stronghold of the Oda clan and was the birthplace of Toyotomi Hideyoshi. After the establishment of the Tokugawa Shogunate, it came under the control of Owari Domain.

=== District Timeline ===
Following the Meiji Restoration, in 1871, former Owari Domain was renamed Nagoya Prefecture. However, for reasons still unclear, the name was changed to Aichi Prefecture. With the formal establishment of the municipality system on October 1, 1887, the modern Aichi District was established, with two towns (Atsuta and Narumi) and 46 villages. Yobitsugi was raised to town status on July 12, 1897, followed by Chikusa on February 13, 1902, and Aichi on December 10, 1904. In a major cadastral reorganization in 1906–1907, the number of remaining villages was reduced from 41 to 16, and the town of Atsuta was annexed by the city of Nagoya. The town of Shimonoisshiki was created on July 6, 1917. In another cadastral reform in 1921, the number of villages was reduced from 16 to 7, with the towns of Aichi and Yobitsugi annexed by Nagoya. The city of Nagoya further annexed Shimonoisshiki in March 1937, leaving the district with one town and 7 villages at the eve of World War II.

On February 11, 1955, the village of Hanyama merged into the city of Seto. Later that year, on April 5, 1955, the village of Chotaka merged into Chikusa-ku, Nagoya. The village of Tempaku (later Tempaku-ku) merged into Showa-ku, Nagoya. On January 1, 1957 Toyoake gained town status, following by Nisshin on January 1, 1958. On April 1, 1963 Narumi merged into Midori-ku, Nagoya.

Tōgō gained town status on April 1, 1970, followed by Nagakute on April 1, 1971. Toyoake was elevated to city status on August 1, 1972, followed by Nisshin on October 1, 1994.

=== Recent mergers ===
- On January 4, 2012 - The town of Nagakute gained city status to become the city of Nagakute.
