= Tokai Gakuen University =

- 東海学園大学
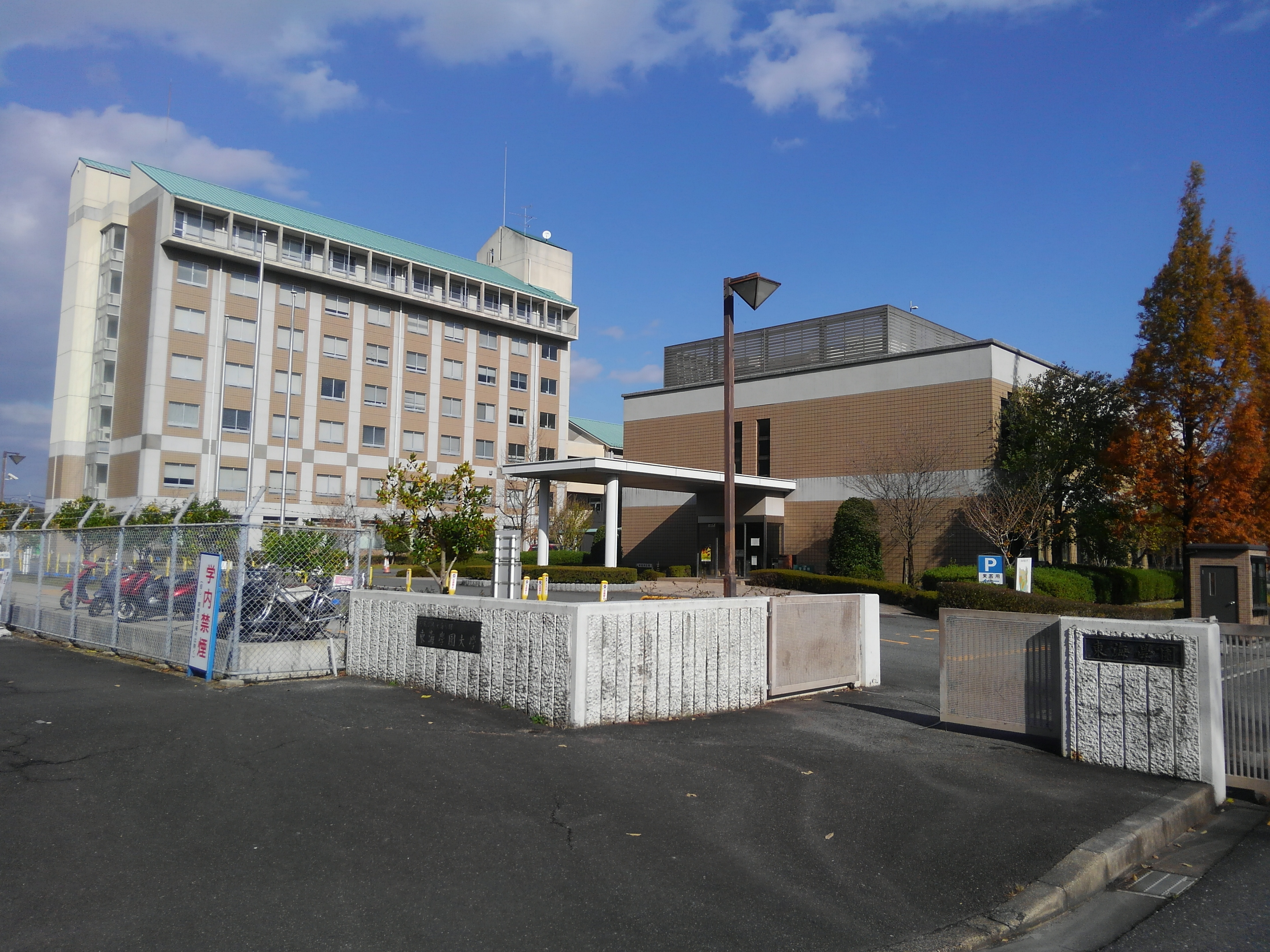
- Other names: TGU
- Motto: 勤倹誠実、共立
- Type: Private
- Established: 1888
- President: Matsubara Takehisa
- Academic staff: 116
- Administrative staff: 88
- Students: 4,406
- Undergraduates: 4,398
- Postgraduates: 8
- Location: Miyoshi, Aichi, Japan; 35.126°N 137.104°E
- Campus: Miyoshi, Nagoya
- Website: www.tokaigakuen-u.ac.jp/english/

Tokai Gakuen University (東海学園大学, Tōkai Gakuen Daigaku), abbreviated as TGU, is a Japanese private university located in Miyoshi, Aichi within the Chubu of Japan. It has a campus in Tempaku-ku, Nagoya.

== History ==
The predecessor of the school dates back to the Meiji era (1888) when it started as a Jodo Buddhist school in Aichi, and was chartered as a university in 1995.

== University ==
Tokai Gakuen(Gakkō Hōjin) Group, including Tokai Gakuen University, are more than 130 years old, and more than 100,000 alumni are active in various fields such as politics, economy, culture, and medicine.

Tokai Gakuen University conducts thorough small-group education and opens seminars for specialized research in small classes from the first year. Acquire basic knowledge and skills directly related to the future.

== Presidents ==
- Takehisa Matsubara(2015-).

== Campus ==
There are two campuses:

- Miyoshi Campus (Miyoshi, Aichi)
- Nagoya Campus (Tenpaku-ku, Nagoya)

== Organization ==
=== Undergraduate programs ===
TGU has six undergraduate faculties. The faculties are:

- School of Business Management
  - Department of Business Management
- School of Humanities
  - Department of Humanities
- School of Psychology
  - Department of Psychology
- School of Education
  - Department of Education
- School of Sport and Health Science
  - Department of Sport and Health Science
- School of Health and Nutrition
  - Department of Nutrition

=== Graduate programs ===
- Graduate School of Business Management
  - Masters course

== Overseas partners ==
United Kingdom

- Aberystwyth University

Australia

- University of Technology Sydney-INSEARCH
- Monash University

Canada

- Queen's University
- Simon Fraser University

Taiwan

- National Taiwan Normal University

Vietnam

- Ho Chi Minh City University of Social Sciences and Humanities
- Hanoi National University of Education
