= Meitetsu Toyota Line =

Railway line in Aichi Prefecture, Japan

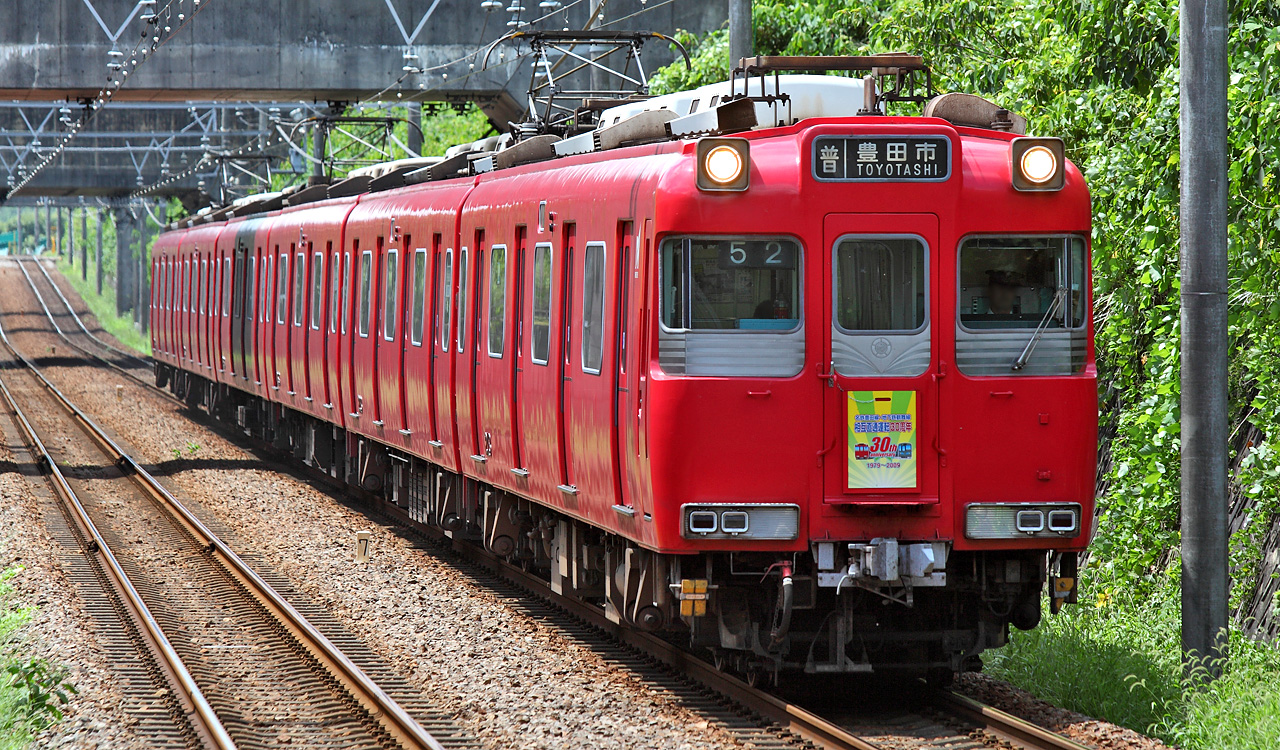
- A Meitetsu 100 series EMU on the Meitetsu Toyota Line

Overview
- Native name: 名鉄豊田線
- Owner: Meitetsu
- Locale: Aichi Prefecture
- Termini: Umetsubo; Akaike
- Stations: 9

Service
- Type: Commuter rail
- Daily ridership: 20,172 (FY2008)

History
- Opened: 29 July 1979; 46 years ago

Technical
- Line length: 15.2 km (9.4 mi)
- Track gauge: 1,067 mm (3 ft 6 in)
- Electrification: 1,500 V DC, overhead catenary
- Operating speed: 100 km/h (62 mph)

The Meitetsu Toyota Line (名鉄豊田線, Meitetsu Toyota-sen) is a 15.2 km (9.4 mi) railway line in Aichi Prefecture, Japan, operated by the private railway operator Meitetsu (Nagoya Railroad) connecting Umetsubo station in Toyota with Akaike Station in Nisshin. The line operates a through service onto the Nagoya Subway Tsurumai Line at Akaike.

== History ==
Prior to the opening of the Toyota Line, the existing ways to move between the city of Toyota and Nagoya by rail was to take a detour south via Meitetsu Mikawa Line or the Okata Line. This inconvenience affecting the city and the nearby municipalities of Tōgō and Nisshin, made the population of the city use cars instead.

== Stations ==
All stations are in Aichi Prefecture. While the nominal terminus of the line is at Umetsubo Station, trains (and passengers) continue past this to terminate at Toyotashi Station.

| No. | Station name | Japanese | Distance (km) | Transfers | Location |
|---|---|---|---|---|---|
| MY07 | Toyotashi | 豊田市 | -1.5 | | Toyota |
| MY08 | Umetsubo | 梅坪 | 0.0 | ■ Meitetsu Mikawa Line | Toyota |
| TT01 | Kami Toyota | 上豊田 | 2.0 | | Toyota |
| TT02 | Jōsui | 浄水 | 3.8 | | Toyota |
| TT03 | Miyoshigaoka | 三好ヶ丘 | 6.3 | | Miyoshi |
| TT04 | Kurozasa | 黒笹 | 8.1 | | Miyoshi |
| TT05 | Komenoki | 米野木 | 10.4 | | Nisshin |
| TT06 | Nisshin | 日進 | 12.2 | | Nisshin |
| TT07 | Akaike | 赤池 | 15.2 | ■ Tsurumai Line (T20) | Nisshin |

== See also ==
- List of railway lines in Japan
