= Akaike Station (Aichi) =

Subway station in Nagoya, Japan

T20 Akaike Station 赤池駅

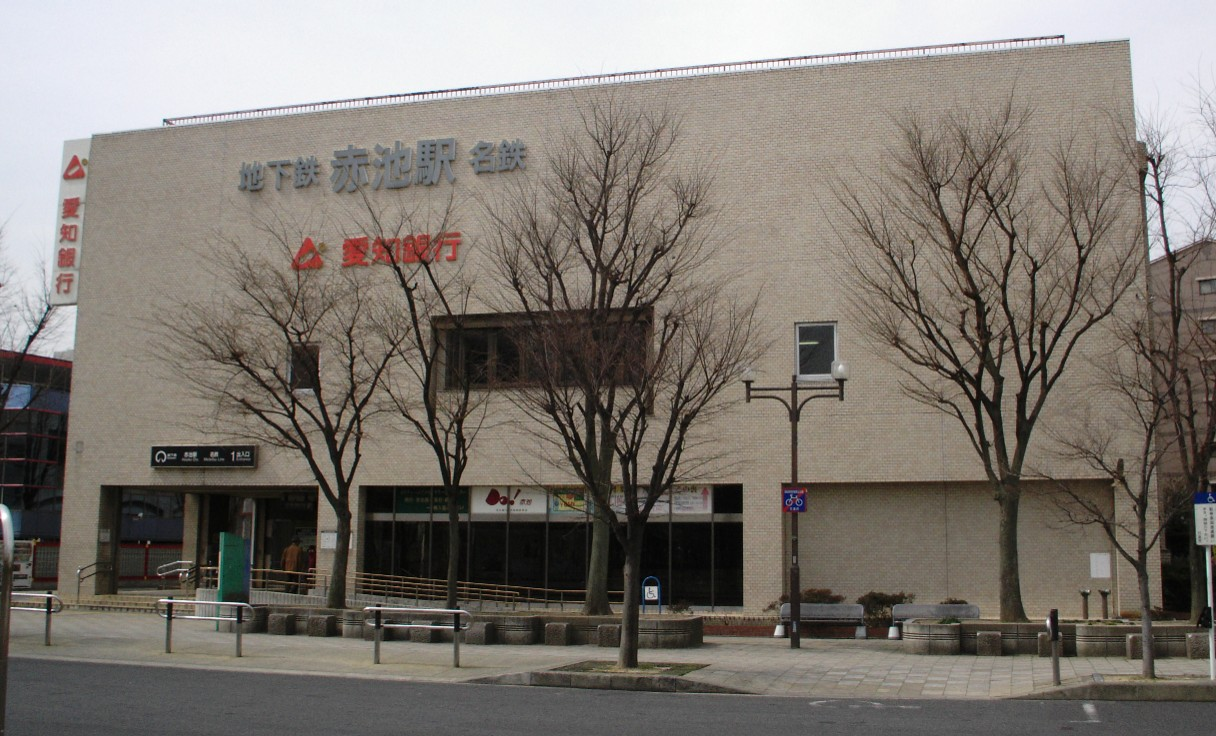
- Akaike Station terminus building in March 2007

General information
- Location: 1-1503 Akaike, Nisshin-shi, Aichi-ken; Japan
- Coordinates: 35°7′16.2624″N 137°1′4.85″E
- System: Rapid Transit and Commuter rail station
- Operator: Transportation Bureau City of Nagoya; Meitetsu
- Lines: Tsurumai Line; TT Meitetsu Toyota Line
- Distance: 20.4 km (12.7 mi) from Kami-Otai (Subway)
- Platforms: 2 island platforms
- Tracks: 3
- Connections: Bus terminal

Other information
- Station code: TT07, T20
- Website: Official website (subway); Official website (Meitetsu)

History
- Opened: 1 October 1978; 48 years ago

Passengers
- FY2017: 30,778 daily

Services
Preceding station	Nagoya Municipal Subway	Following station
Hirabari T19 towards Kami-Otai	Tsurumai Line	through to Meitetsu Toyota Line
Preceding station	Meitetsu	Following station
through to Tsurumai Line	Toyota Line	Nisshin towards Toyotashi
Location

Akaike Station (赤池駅, Akaike-eki) is a railway station in the city of Nisshin, Aichi, Japan, jointly operated by the Transportation Bureau City of Nagoya and private railway operator Nagoya Railroad (Meitetsu).

== Lines ==
The Meitetsu portion of the station is the terminus of the Meitetsu Toyota Line, and is located 15.2 km (9.4 mi) from the opposing terminus of the line at Umetsubo. The Municipal Subway portion of the station is served by the Tsurumai Line and is 20.4 km (12.7 mi) from the opposing terminus of the line at Kami-Otai.

== Station layout ==
The station has two underground island platforms serving a total of three tracks. There are wheelchair-accessible toilets and elevators. The station has automated ticket machines, Manaca automated turnstiles and is staffed.

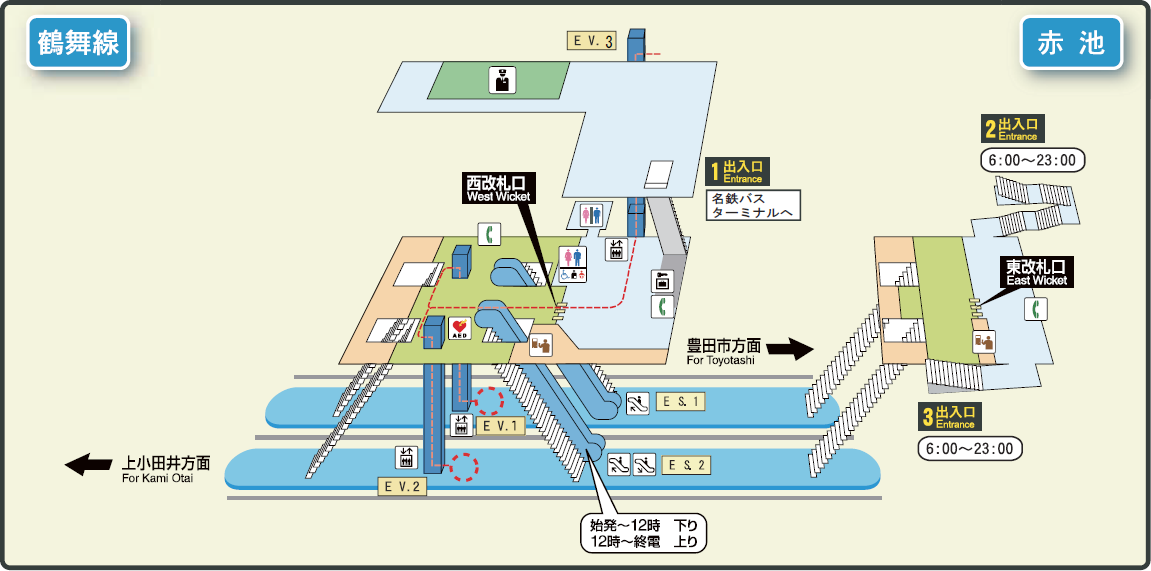
The station interior layout

Akaike Station track diagram

=== Platforms ===
1	■ Meitetsu Toyota Line	for Umetsubo and Toyotashi
2	■ Meitetsu Toyota Line	Tsurumai Line disembarking passengers only
3	■ Tsurumai Line	for Fushimi, Kami Otai, and Inuyama
4	■ Tsurumai Line	for Fushimi, Kami Otai, and Inuyama

On both platforms, door 10 is closest to the elevator.

== History ==
The Nagoya Subway station opened on 1 October 1978. The Meitetsu Toyota Line opened on 29 July 1979, from which date through-running between the two lines commenced.

== Passenger statistics ==
In fiscal 2017, the station was used by an average of 30,778 passengers daily.

== Surrounding area ==
- Nagoya City Tram & Subway Museum
- Nisshin Nishi High School
- Akaike Elementary School

== See also ==
- List of railway stations in Japan
