= Fushimi Station (Nagoya) =

Metro station in Japan

Coordinates: 35.1692°N 136.898°E

H09 T07 Fushimi Station 伏見駅
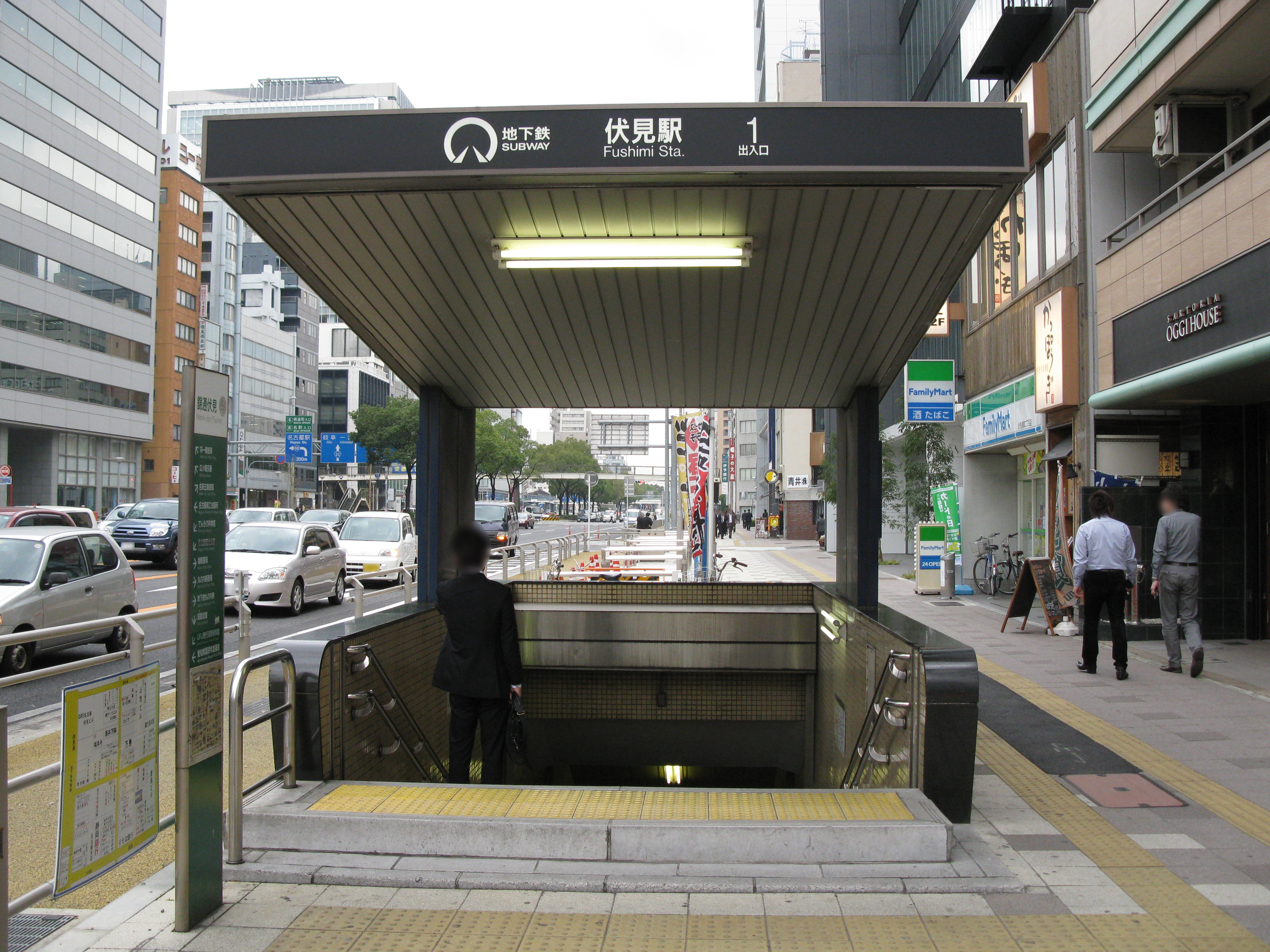
- Fushimi Station, 1st Entrance

General information
- Location: Nishiki 2-16-24, Naka Ward, Nagoya City, Aichi Prefecture (名古屋市中区錦二丁目16-24); Japan
- System: Nagoya Municipal Subway station
- Operator: Transportation Bureau City of Nagoya
- Lines: Higashiyama Line; Tsurumai Line
- Connections: Bus terminal

Other information
- Station code: H09; T07

History
- Opened: 15 November 1957; 68 years ago
- Former names: Fushimi-chō (until 1966)

Passengers
- 2009: 41,884 daily

Services
Preceding station	Nagoya Municipal Subway	Following station
Nagoya H08 towards Takabata	Higashiyama Line	Sakae H10 towards Fujigaoka
Marunouchi T06 towards Kami-Otai	Tsurumai Line	Ōsu Kannon T08 towards Akaike
Location

Fushimi Station (伏見駅, Fushimi-eki) is an underground metro station located in Naka-ku, Nagoya, Aichi Prefecture, Japan operated by the Nagoya Municipal Subway. The station is an interchange station between the Tsurumai Line and the Higashiyama Line, and is located 7.0 rail kilometers from the terminus of the Tsurumai Line at Kami-Otai Station and 8.0 rail kilometers from the terminus of the Higashiyama Line at Takabata Station. It is the shallowest station in the city's subway system.

== History ==
Fushimi Station was opened on 15 November 1957 as Fushimi-chō Station (伏見町駅, Fushimi-chō-eki) on the Higashiyama Line. It was renamed to its present name on 1 June 1966. The Tsurumai Line connected to the station on 18 March 1977.

== Details ==
Fushimi Station has two pair of underground opposed side platforms, built on different levels. It is the shallowest station in the city's subway system, with the platform located only 5.3 meters below ground. The east side of the station is connected with the Fushimi Chikagai.

=== Platforms ===
1	■ Higashiyama Line	For Sakae, Higashiyama Kōen, and Fujigaoka
2	■ Higashiyama Line	For Nagoya and Takabata
3	■ Tsurumai Line	For Yagoto, Akaike, and Toyotashi
4	■ Tsurumai Line	For Kami-Otai, Iwakura, and Inuyama
