= Toyotashi Station =

Railway station in Toyota, Aichi Prefecture, Japan

Toyotashi Station 豊田市駅

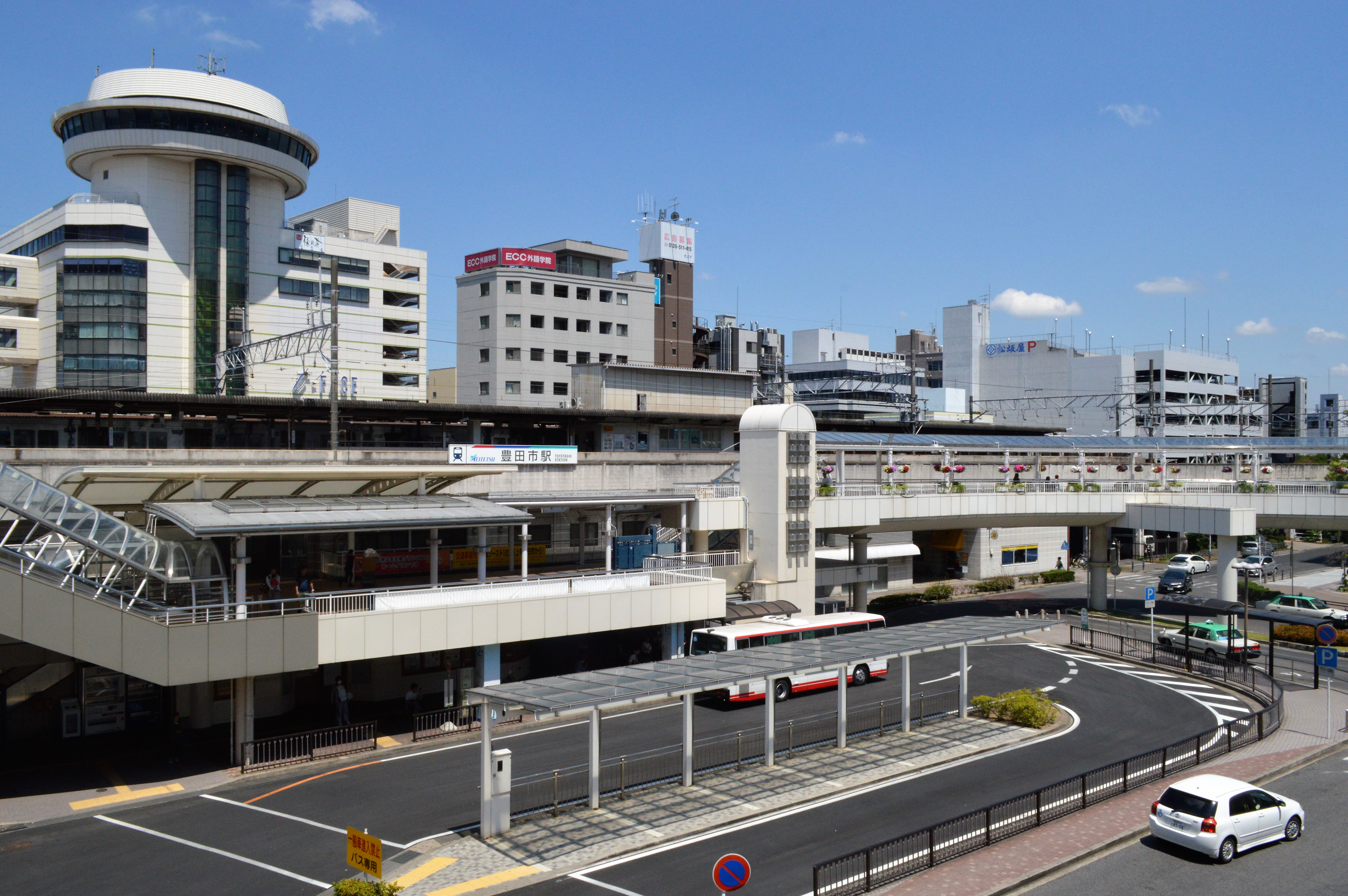
- Toyotashi Station in June 2017

General information
- Location: 1-35 Wakamiyachō, Toyota-shi, Aichi-ken 471-0026; Japan
- Coordinates: 35.0868°N 137.1567°E
- Operator: Meitetsu
- Lines: ■ Mikawa Line; ■ Toyota Line
- Distance: 15.7 kilometers from Chiryū
- Platforms: 1 side + island platform

Other information
- Status: Staffed
- Station code: MY07
- Website: Official website

History
- Opened: November 11, 1920
- Former names: Koromo (until 1959)

Passengers
- FY2017: 35,081 daily

Services
| Preceding station | Meitetsu | Following station |
|---|---|---|
| Umetsubo towards Sanage | Mikawa Line Sanage–Chiryū | Uwa Goromo towards Chiryū |
| Umetsubo towards Akaike | Toyota Line | Terminus |
Location
- Location within Aichi Prefecture Location within Japan

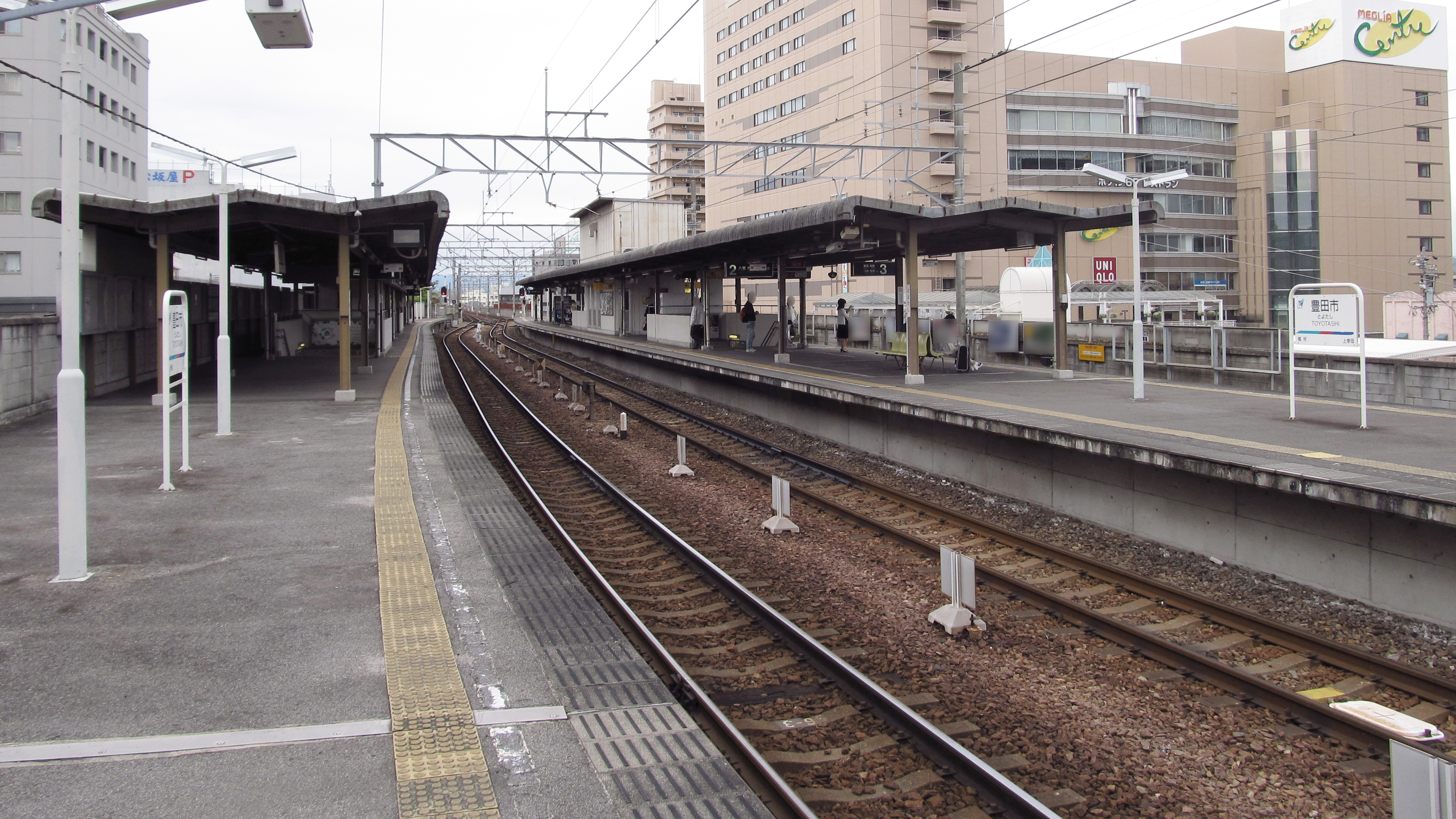
Platforms

Toyotashi Station track diagram

Toyotashi Station (豊田市駅, Toyotashi-eki) is a junction railway station in the city of Toyota, Aichi, Japan, operated by Meitetsu.

== Lines ==
Toyotashi Station is served by the Meitetsu Mikawa Line and is 15.7 km (9.8 mi) from the terminus of the line at Chiryū Station. It is also served by trains of the Meitetsu Toyota Line which continue past the nominal terminus of the line at Umetsubo Station to terminate at this station.

== Station layout ==
The station has one side platform and one island platform. The station has automated ticket machines, Manaca automated turnstiles and is staffed.

=== Platforms ===
| 1 | ■ Mikawa Line | For Sanage |
| | ■ Toyota Line | For Akaike, Fushimi, and Kami Otai |
| 2 | ■ Toyota Line | For Akaike, Fushimi and Kami Otai |
| 3 | ■ Mikawa Line | For Chiryū |

== Station history ==
Toyotashi Station was opened on November 11, 1920, as Koromo Station (挙母駅, Koromo-eki) on the privately owned Mikawa Railway. The Mikawa Railway was merged with Meitetsu on June 1, 1941. The station was renamed to its present name on October 1, 1959. The station building was rebuilt in 1961. The tracks were elevated in 1985 and a new station building was completed at that time.

== Passenger statistics ==
In fiscal 2017, the station was used by an average of 35,081 passengers daily.

== Surrounding area ==
- Toyota City Hall
- Toyota Municipal Museum of Art

== See also ==
- List of railway stations in Japan
