= Kami-Otai Station =

Railway and metro station in Nagoya, Japan

Coordinates: 35.2236°N 136.8770°E

T01 Kami-Otai Station 上小田井駅

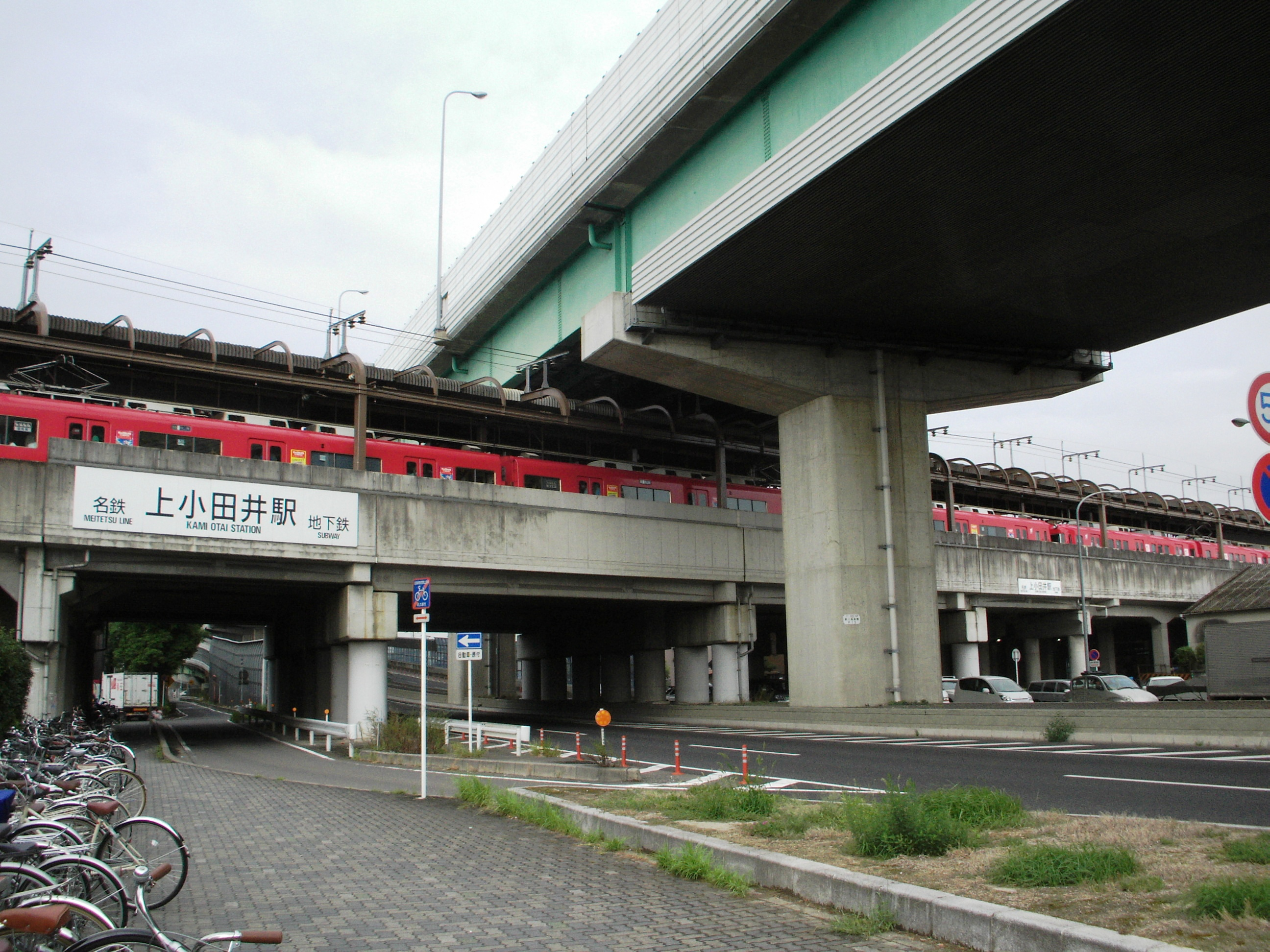
- Kami-Otai Station elevated platform (2007)

General information
- Location: Nishi, Nagoya, Aichi; Japan
- System: Rapid transit and commuter rail station
- Operator: Transportation Bureau City of Nagoya; Meitetsu
- Lines: Tsurumai Line; IY Inuyama Line
- Connections: Bus terminal

Other information
- Station code: IY03, T01

History
- Opened: 27 October 1991; 34 years ago

Passengers
- 2007: 7,365 daily

Services
Preceding station	Nagoya Municipal Subway	Following station
Terminus	Tsurumai Line	Shōnai Ryokuchi Kōen T02 towards Akaike
Preceding station	Meitetsu	Following station
Meitetsu Nagoya towards Toyohashi	Inuyama Line Rapid Express	Nishiharu towards Shin-Unuma
Naka-Otai towards Shimo Otai	Inuyama Line Express	Nishiharu towards Shin-Unuma
Sakō towards Toyohashi	Inuyama Line Express	Nishiharu towards Shin-Unuma
Sakō towards Ina	Inuyama Line Semi-Express	Nishiharu towards Shin-Unuma
Naka-Otai towards Shimo Otai	Inuyama Line Local	Nishiharu towards Shin-Unuma
Location

Kami-Otai Station layout

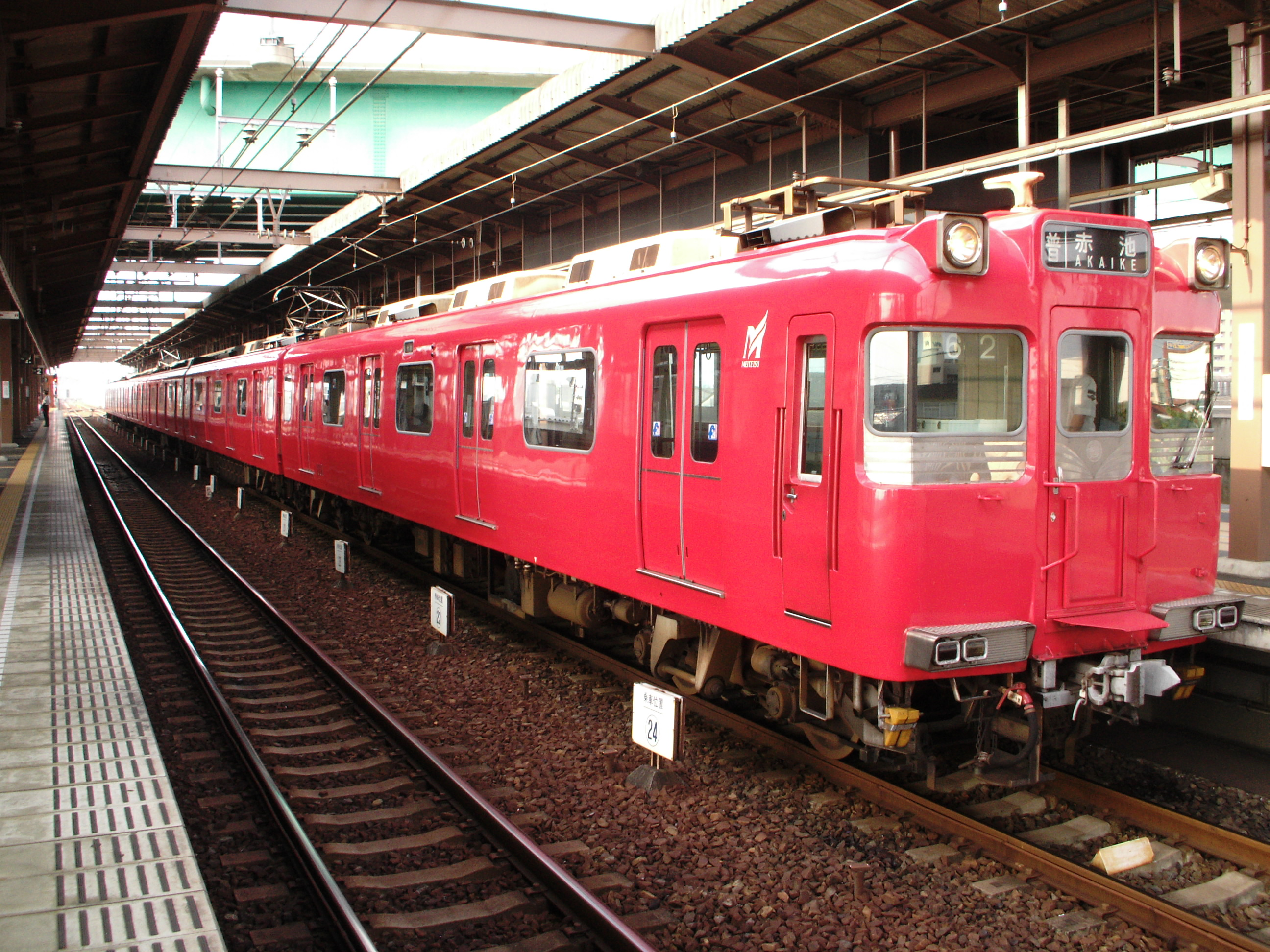
Meitetsu Type 100 trainset at Kami-Otai Station (2006)

Kami-Otai Station (上小田井駅, Kami-Otai-eki) is a railway station in Nishi-ku, Nagoya, Aichi Prefecture, Japan.

The station is built over Route 302 and under the Higashi-Meihan Expressway, and it is a 10-minute walk from Otai Station on the Jōhoku Line.

This station was opened on 27 October 1991, although a predecessor with a different name was opened in 1912 as a station on the Meitetsu Inuyama Line.

== Lines ==
- Nagoya Municipal Subway
  - Tsurumai Line (Station number: T01)
- Nagoya Railroad
  - Inuyama Line (Station number: IY03)

== Layout ==
The station has two wickets, the North Wicket and the South Wicket.

=== Platforms ===
1	■ Inuyama Line	For Iwakura, Kōnan, and Inuyama
2	■ Inuyama Line	For Iwakura, Kōnan, and Inuyama (From the Tsurumai Line); Tsurumai Line termination platform
3	■ Tsurumai Line	For Shōnai Ryokuchi Kōen, Fushimi and Akaike
4	■ Inuyama Line	For Meitetsu-Nagoya, Central Japan International Airport, and Utsumi
