= Nagoya Municipal Subway =

Rapid transit system in Japan

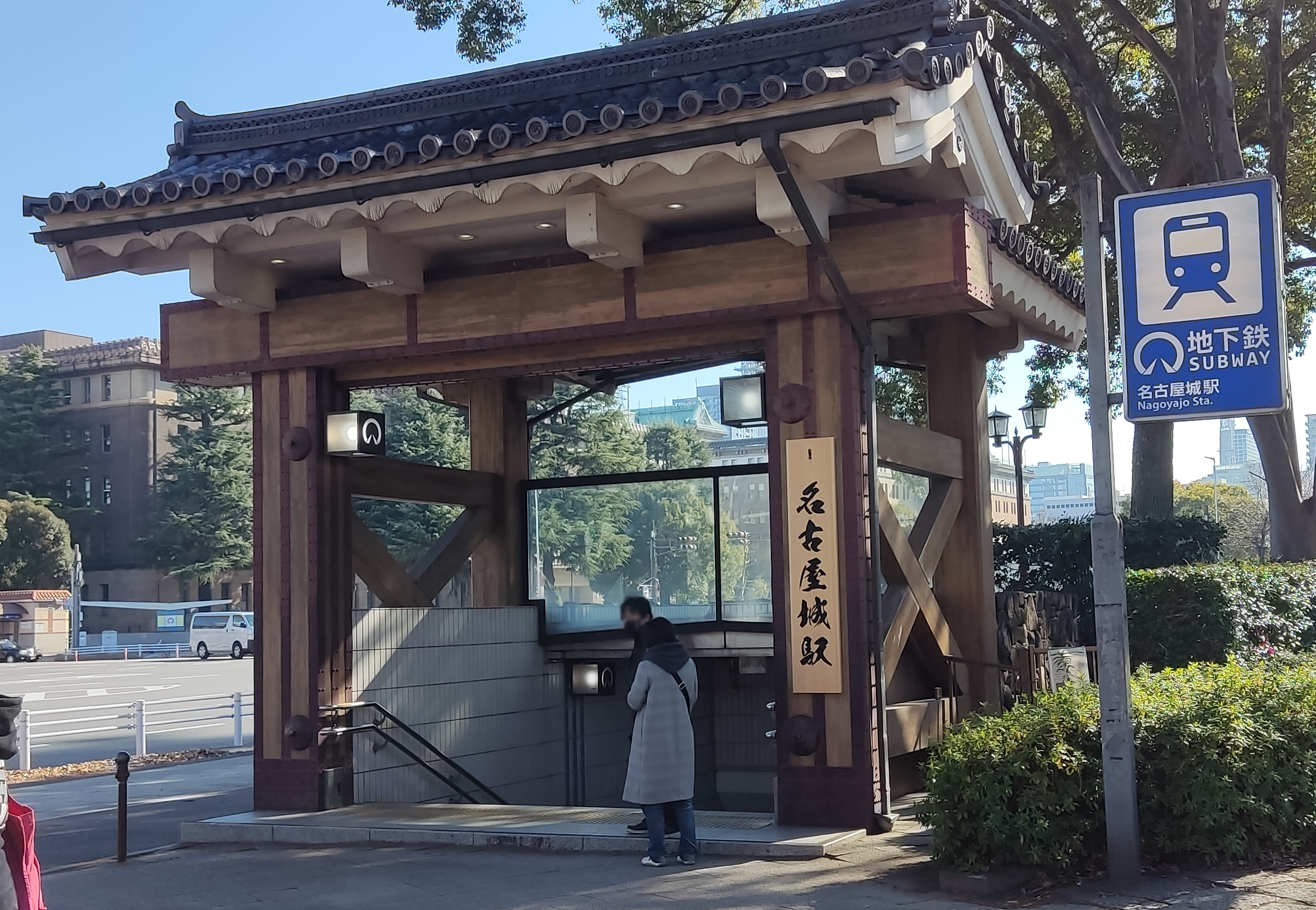
- Entrance to Nagoyajo Station

Overview
- Native name: 名古屋市営地下鉄
- Locale: Nagoya, Aichi, Japan
- Transit type: Rapid Transit
- Number of lines: 6
- Number of stations: 87
- Daily ridership: 1,263,018 (FY 2024)
- Annual ridership: 461,001,385 (FY 2024)
- Website: www.kotsu.city.nagoya.jp

Operation
- Began operation: 15 November 1957; 69 years ago
- Operator: Nagoya City Transportation Bureau

Technical
- System length: 93.3 km (58.0 mi)
- Track gauge: 1,435 mm (4 ft 8 1/2 in) (Note: Higashiyama and Meijō/Meikō Lines); 1,067 mm (3 ft 6 in) (Note: Tsurumai, Sakura-dōri, and Kamiiida Lines)
- Electrification: 600 V DC third rail (Note: Higashiyama and Meijō/Meikō Lines); 1,500 V DC overhead lines (Note: Tsurumai, Sakura-dōri, and Kamiiida Lines)
System map
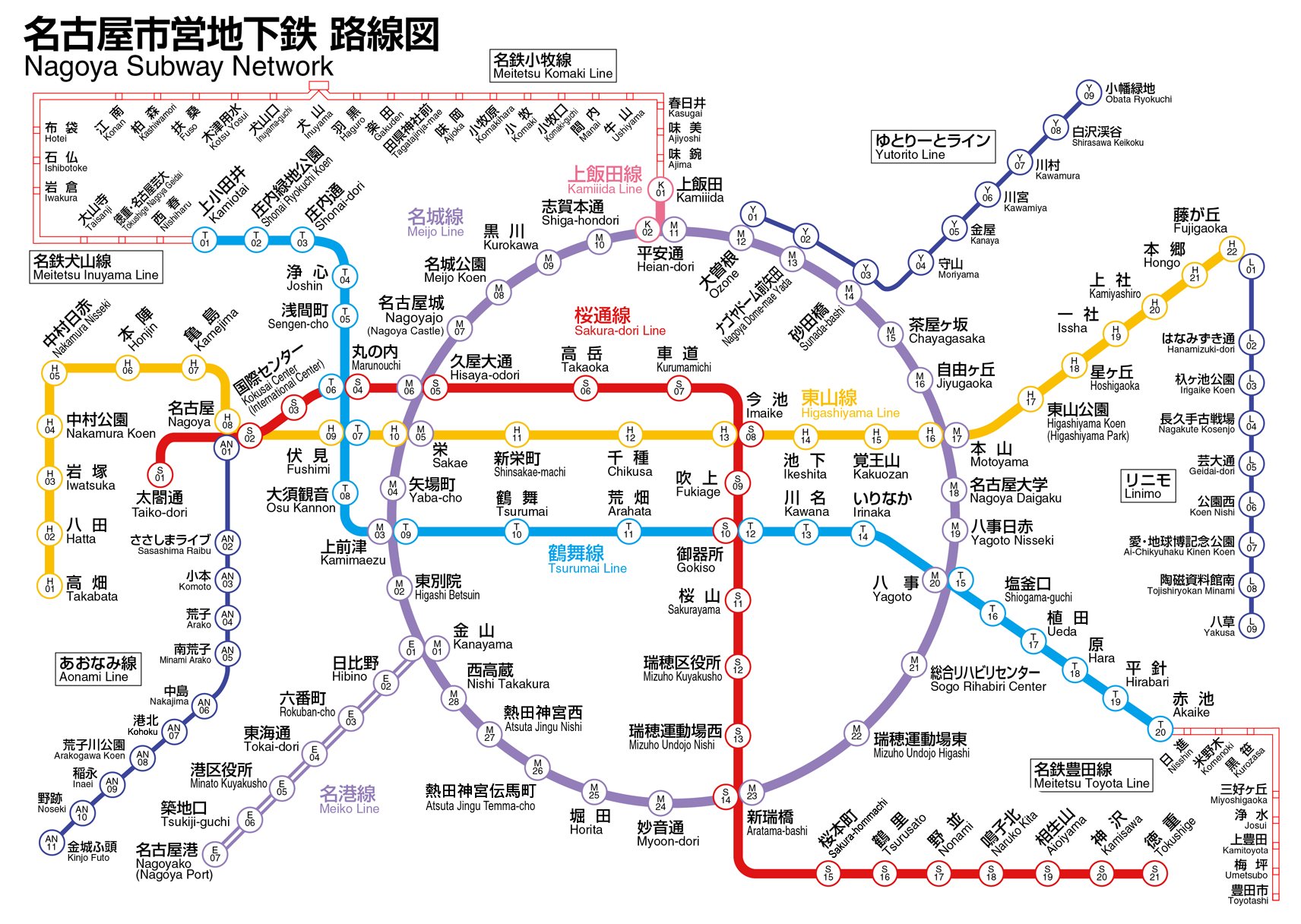
Map of Nagoya Municipal Subway

The Nagoya Municipal Subway (Japanese: 名古屋市営地下鉄), also known as the Nagoya Subway, is a rapid transit system serving Nagoya, the capital of Aichi Prefecture, Japan operated by the Nagoya City Transportation Bureau. The system opened in 1957, consisting of six lines with a total route length of 93.3 km (58.0 mi) and serves 87 stations, approximately 90 percent of which are located underground.

Like other major Japanese cities such as Tokyo and Osaka, Nagoya's rail transportation system is heavily complemented by suburban railways, together forming an extensive network of 47 lines in and around Greater Nagoya. Of these, the subway lines account for approximately 38 percent of Greater Nagoya's total rail ridership of about 3 million passengers per day. In 2002, the system introduced Hatchii as its official mascot.

Under Nagoya City regulations, the system's official name is Nagoya City Rapid Transit (名古屋市高速度鉄道).

The network serves all 16 wards of Nagoya with the exception of Moriyama, and also extends to Nisshin, the only municipality outside Nagoya City with a station on the network.

== History ==
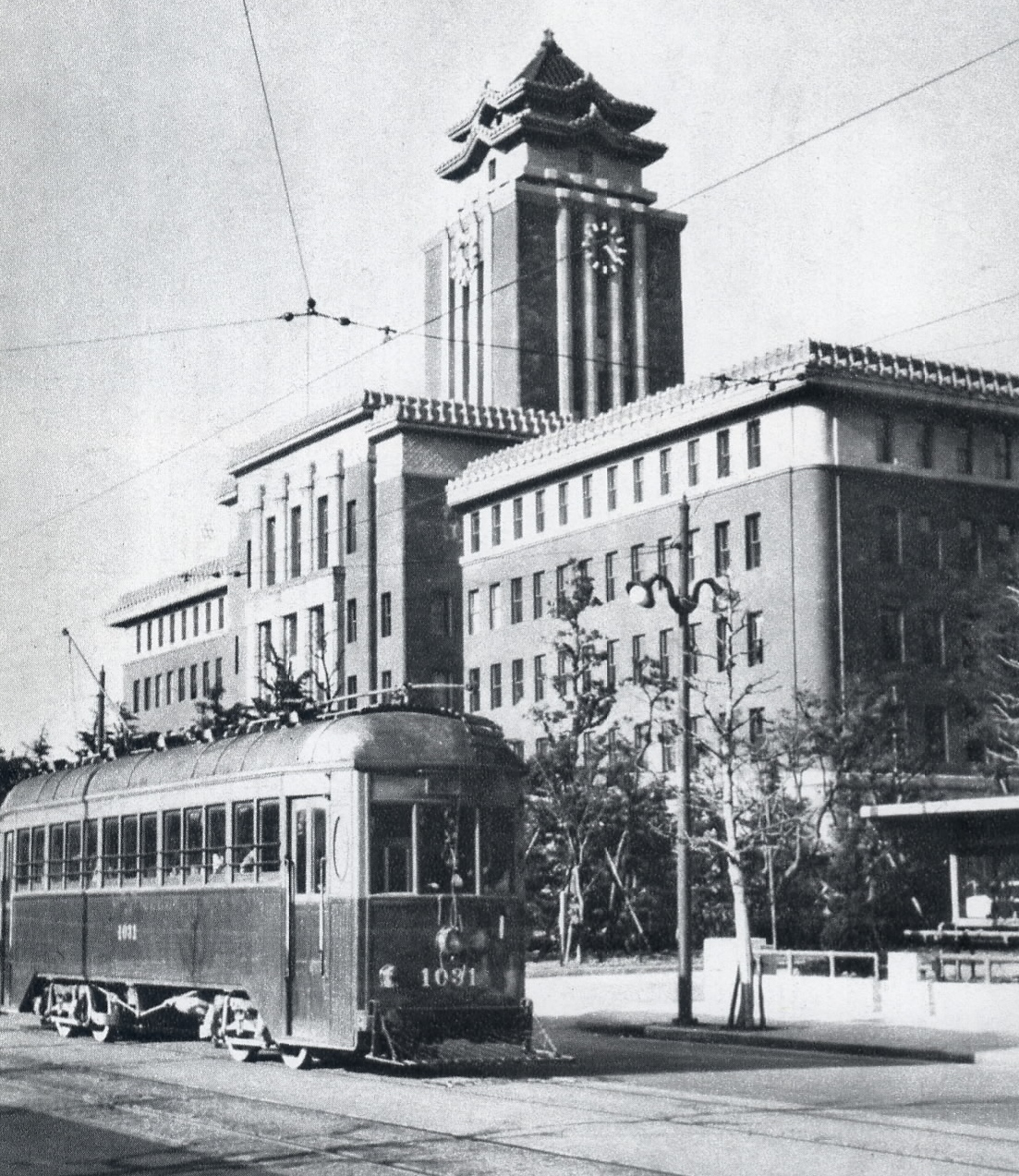
Nagoya City Tram running in front of Nagoya City Hall, 1939

Nagoya's population grew rapidly after World War I and surpassed one million in 1934. At the time, city trams, the primary mode of transportation operated by the Nagoya City Transportation Bureau were severely overcrowded, prompting consideration of alternative measures, including the construction of a subway system following precedents set in Tokyo (1927) and Osaka (1933).

In 1936, Nagoya City's first plan for a municipally operated subway was announced. The plan proposed the construction of seven lines totaling approximately 52 km, to be built in two phases; however, the project was shelved due to high construction costs and preparations for the Nagoya Pan-Pacific Peace Exposition the following year. The prolonged Sino-Japanese War placed increasing strain on Nagoya's finances. However, as the city developed into a major military–industrial center, the Provisional Nagoya City and Suburban Transportation Research Committee was established in 1939. After reviewing earlier subway proposals, the committee announced a revised plan consisting of four core lines totaling approximately 29 km. Nevertheless, the outbreak of World War II led to the suspension of all subway planning activities.

=== Post-WWII construction ===
After the war, a basic plan proposing four lines with a total length of approximately 43 km was announced in January 1946 as part of efforts to develop a high-speed railway network. Drafted as an urban planning measure for postwar reconstruction and based on an assumed future population of 2 million, the plan primarily aimed to secure land for railway construction prior to the commencement of building work.

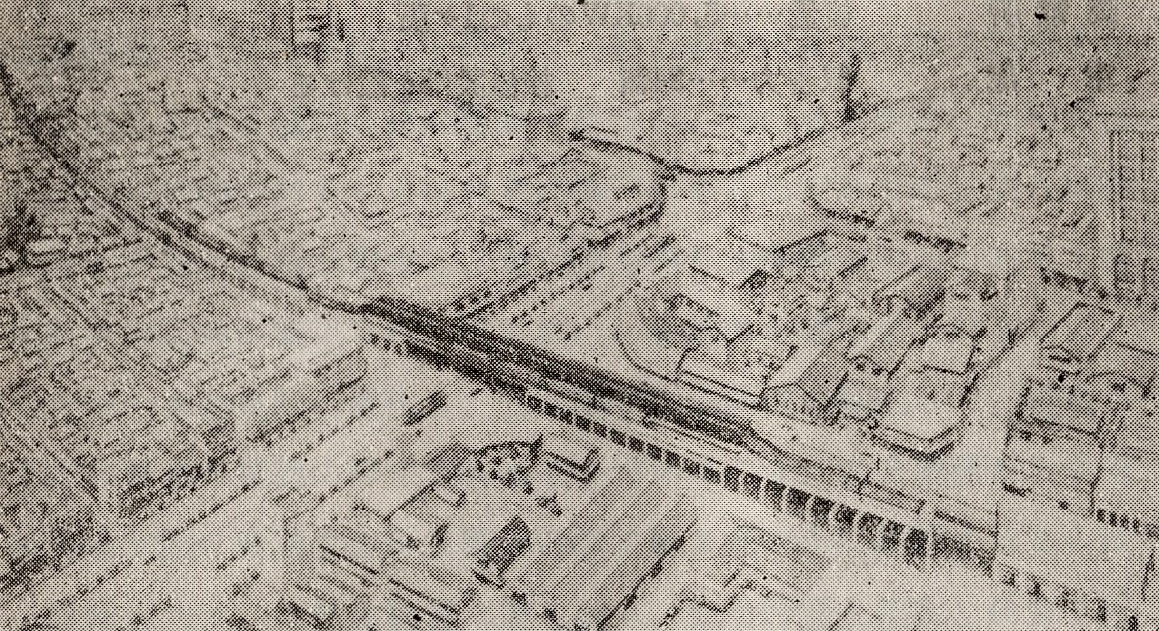
Proposed Yanagibashi Station (1952). The original plan called for portions of the station to be elevated in the city center to accommodate a connection to Nagoya Station and reduce construction costs.

On January 19, 1950, the Ministry of Construction issued Notification No. 9, designating approximately 48.4 km of the planned route as part of the Nagoya Reconstruction Urban Planning High-Speed Railway Network (名古屋復興都市計画高速度鉄道路線網). Construction of the Nagoya–Sakaemachi section began in August 1954, and operational testing of a prototype train commenced in 1956 on the Nagoya City Tram Shimonoichishiki Line.

On November 15, 1957, the Nagoya Municipal Subway opened its first section, between Nagoya and Sakaemachi (now Sakae). The initial fare between the two stations was a flat rate of 15 yen for adults and 8 yen for children, and one test ticket was distributed to each household in Nagoya City.

=== Chronology ===
- November 15, 1957 – Line 1 (now the Higashiyama Line) opens between Nagoya and Sakaemachi.

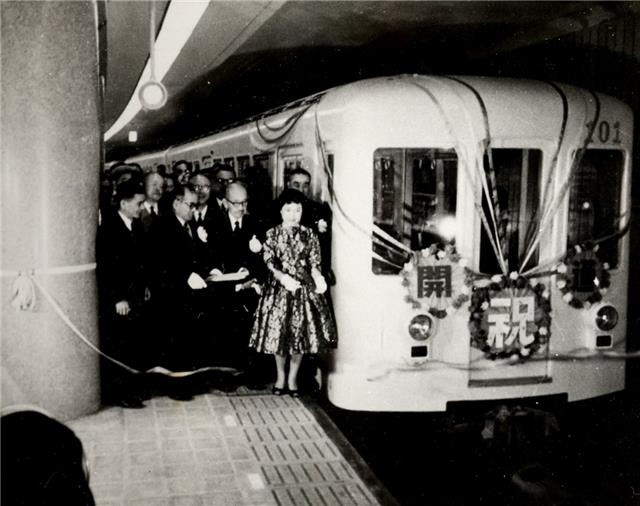
The opening ceremony of the Nagoya Municipal Subway, 1957.

- June 15, 1960 – Line 1 opens between Sakaemachi and Ikeshita.
- April 1, 1963 – Line 1 opens between Ikeshita and Higashiyama koen.
- October 15, 1965 – Line 2 (now the Meijo Line) opens between Sakaemachi and City Hall.
- June 1, 1966 – Station names are changed (Sakaemachi → Sakae; Fushimimachi → Fushimi).
- March 30, 1967 – Line 1 opens between Higashiyama koen and Hoshigaoka, and Line 2 opens between Sakae and Kanayama.
- April 1, 1969 – Line 1 opens between Hoshigaoka and Fujigaoka, and between Nagoya and Nakamura koen.
- May 1, 1969 – Line 1 becomes officially known as the Higashiyama Line, and Line 2 as the Meijo Line.
- December 10, 1970 – Kamiyashiro Station opens on the Higashiyama Line.
- March 29, 1971 – The Meijo Line opens between Kanayama and Nagoya Port (now the Meiko Line).
- March 30, 1974 – Line 4 opens between Kanayama and Aratamabashi.
- March 18, 1977 – The Tsurumai Line opens between Fushimi and Yagoto.
- October 1, 1978 – The Tsurumai Line opens between Yagoto and Akaike.
- July 29, 1979 – Mutual through service begins between the Tsurumai Line and the Meitetsu Toyota Line.
- November 27, 1981 – The Tsurumai Line opens between Joshin and Fushimi.
- September 21, 1982 – The Higashiyama Line opens between Nakamurakoen and Takahata, completing the line.
- September 6, 1984 – The Tsurumai Line opens between Shonai Ryokuchi Park and Joshin.
- September 10, 1989 – The Sakuradori Line opens between Nakamura-Kuyakusho and Imaike; Hisaya-odori Station opens on the Meijo Line.
- August 12, 1993 – The Tsurumai Line opens between Kami-Odai and Shonai Ryokuchi Koen, completing the line; through service begins with the Meitetsu Inuyama Line.
- March 30, 1994 – The Sakuradori Line opens between Imaike and Nonami.
- January 19, 2000 – Line 4 opens between Ozone and Sunadabashi.
- March 27, 2003 – The Kamiiida Line opens between Heian-dori and Kamiiida; through service begins with the Meitetsu Komaki Line.
- December 13, 2003 – Line 4 opens between Sunadabashi and Nagoya Daigaku.
- October 6, 2004 – The Meijo Line opens between Nagoya-Daigaku and Aratamabashi, completing the line; Line 4 is renamed the Meijo Line and circular operation begins; station numbering is introduced.
- March 27, 2011 – The Sakuradori Line opens between Nonami and Tokushige.
- January 4, 2023 – Station names are changed, including Nakamura-Kuyakusho to Taiko-dori and Shiyakusho to Nagoyajo.

== Lines and infrastructure ==
The six lines that comprise the Nagoya subway network are, for the most part, independent. However, Meikō Line services partially interline with the Meijō Line, and the operations of both lines are combined. Therefore, there are in fact five distinct services on the subway. They are mostly self-contained, but two of its lines have through services onto lines owned and operated by Meitetsu, the largest private railway operator in the region. One of these, the Kamiida Line, is essentially an extension of the Meitetsu Komaki Line to which it connects.

The first two subway lines, the Higashiyama and Meijō/Meikō Lines, run on standard gauge track and use 600 volt DC electrification from a third rail. They are three of the eleven subway lines in Japan which use both third-rail electrification and standard gauge track (the Ginza and Marunouchi lines in Tokyo are the only other two lines to use third rail at that voltage; five of the eight lines of the Osaka Metro and the Blue Line in Yokohama all use 750 V DC third rail). Subsequent lines were built to narrow gauge and employ 1,500 volt DC electrification from overhead lines, in common with most other rapid transit lines in the country.

As with other railway lines in Japan, tickets can be purchased from ticket vending machines in stations. Since February 2011, this has largely been supplemented by Manaca, a rechargeable smart card. In 2012, Manaca replaced Tranpass, the predecessor integrated ticketing system, which was also able to be used at subway stations and for other connected transportation systems in the region.

On January 4, 2023, four stations were renamed:

- Nakamura Kuyakusho → Taiko-dori
- Shiyakusho (City Hall) → Nagoyajo (Nagoya Castle)
- Temma-cho → Atsuta Jingu Temma-cho
- Jingu Nishi → Atsuta Jingu Nishi

=== List of Nagoya Municipal Subway lines ===
Name	Line icon	Line color	Line number	Route	Stations	Length	First Opened	Last Extension	Train Length	Gauge	Current supply
Higashiyama Line		Windsor yellow	Line 1	Takabata to Fujigaoka	22	20.6 km (12.8 mi)	1957	1982	6 cars	1,435 mm (4 ft 8 1/2 in)	600 V DC, third rail
Meijō Line		Purple	Line 2	Kanayama to Ōzone via Sakae	12 (Note: Including Ōzone Station)	8.9 km (5.5 mi)	1965	1971	6 cars	1,435 mm (4 ft 8 1/2 in)	600 V DC, third rail
Meijō Line		Purple	Line 4	Ōzone to Kanayama via Nagoya Daigaku	17	17.5 km (10.9 mi)	1974	2004	6 cars	1,435 mm (4 ft 8 1/2 in)	600 V DC, third rail
Meikō Line		Purple	Line 2	Kanayama to Nagoyakō	7 (Note: Including Kanayama Station (Aichi))	6.0 km (3.7 mi)	1971	—N/a	6 cars	1,435 mm (4 ft 8 1/2 in)	600 V DC, third rail
Meitetsu Inuyama Line	Tsurumai Line	Blue	Via trackage rights	Inuyama to Kamiotai	13 (Note: Including Kamiotai Station)	21.4 km (13.3 mi)	1993	—N/a	6 cars	1,067 mm (3 ft 6 in)	1,500 V DC, overhead supply
Tsurumai Line	Tsurumai Line	Blue	Line 3	Kamiotai to Akaike	20	20.4 km (12.7 mi)	1977	1993	6 cars	1,067 mm (3 ft 6 in)	1,500 V DC, overhead supply
Meitetsu Toyota Line	Tsurumai Line	Blue	Via trackage rights	Akaike to Umetsubo	8 (Note: Including Akaike Station)	15.2 km (9.4 mi)	1979	—N/a	6 cars	1,067 mm (3 ft 6 in)	1,500 V DC, overhead supply
Meitetsu Mikawa Line	Tsurumai Line	Blue	Via trackage rights	Umetsubo to Toyotashi	2	1.4 km (0.87 mi)	N/A	—N/a	6 cars	1,067 mm (3 ft 6 in)	1,500 V DC, overhead supply
Sakura-dōri Line		Red	Line 6	Taiko-dori to Tokushige	21	19.1 km (11.9 mi)	1989	2011	5 cars	1,067 mm (3 ft 6 in)	1,500 V DC, overhead supply
Meitetsu Komaki Line	Kamiiida Line	Pink	Via trackage rights	Inuyama to Ajima	13 (Note: Including Ajima Station)	18.3 km (11.4 mi)	2003	—N/a	4 cars	1,067 mm (3 ft 6 in)	1,500 V DC, overhead supply
Meitetsu Komaki Line	Kamiiida Line	Pink	Via trackage rights	Ajima to Kamiiida	2 (Note: Including Ajima Station and Kamiiida Station)	2.3 km (1.4 mi)	2003 (Note: Owned by Kamiiida Link Line)	—N/a	4 cars	1,067 mm (3 ft 6 in)	1,500 V DC, overhead supply
Kamiiida Line	Kamiiida Line	Pink	Line 7	Kamiiida to Heian-dori	2 (Note: Including Kamiiida Station)	0.8 km (0.50 mi)	2003	—N/a	4 cars	1,067 mm (3 ft 6 in)	1,500 V DC, overhead supply
		Total (Subway only – not incl. trackage rights portions):			87	93.3 km (58.0 mi)					

=== Connecting services ===
The Nagoya Municipal Subway is closely integrated with JR Central services, including the Tōkaidō Shinkansen, at several major transfer points. Nagoya Station functions as the principal interchange, where the Higashiyama Line (Line 1) and the Sakura-dōri Line (Line 6) connect directly via underground passageways to the JR Tōkaidō Main Line platforms and the Shinkansen concourse located on the upper levels of the station complex. These arrangements are designed to handle heavy passenger flows, with shared concourses equipped with multilingual guidance, escalators, and elevators to facilitate efficient movement between subway facilities and JR ticket gates.

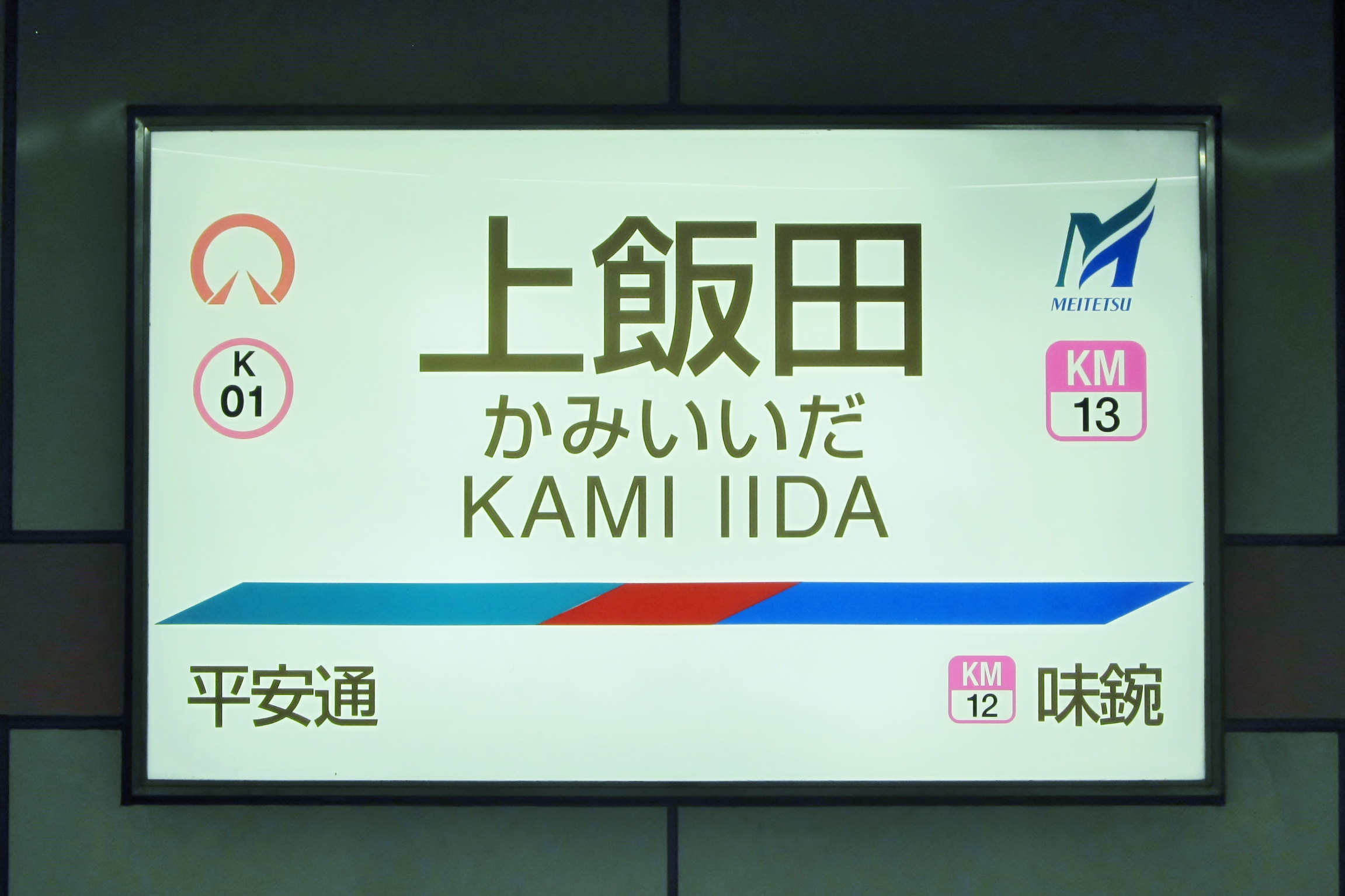
Station signboard at Kamiiida Station, serving through services between the Meitetsu Komaki Line and the Nagoya Municipal Subway Kamiiida Line.

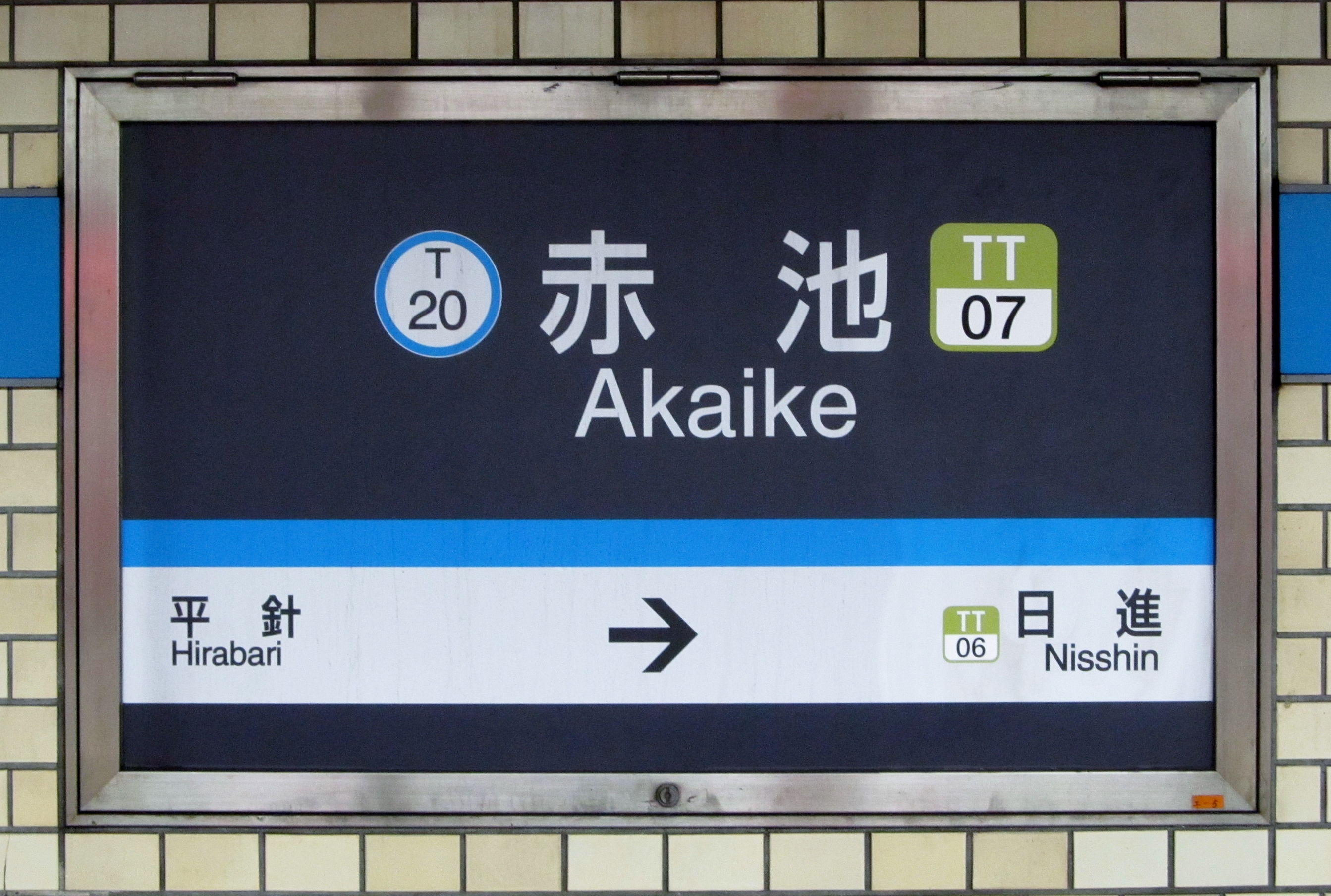
Station signboard at Akaike Station, serving through services between the Meitetsu Toyota Line and the Nagoya Municipal Subway Tsurumai Line.

==== JR Central ====
- Tōkaidō Shinkansen: at Nagoya

(for Shin-Yokohama, Tokyo, Kyoto, and Shin-Osaka)

- Tōkaidō Main Line: at Nagoya and Kanayama

(for Gifu, Ōgaki, Obu, Kariya, Okazaki, Toyohashi, and Hamamatsu)

- Chūō Main Line: at Nagoya, Kanayama, Tsurumai, Chikusa, and Ōzone

(for Kozoji (transfer to former Expo Site), Tajimi, and Nakatsugawa)

- Kansai Main Line: at Nagoya and Hatta

(for Yokkaichi, Tsu and Kameyama

- Takayama Main Line: at Nagoya

(Limited Express only, for Gero and Takayama)

==== Meitetsu (Nagoya Railroad) ====
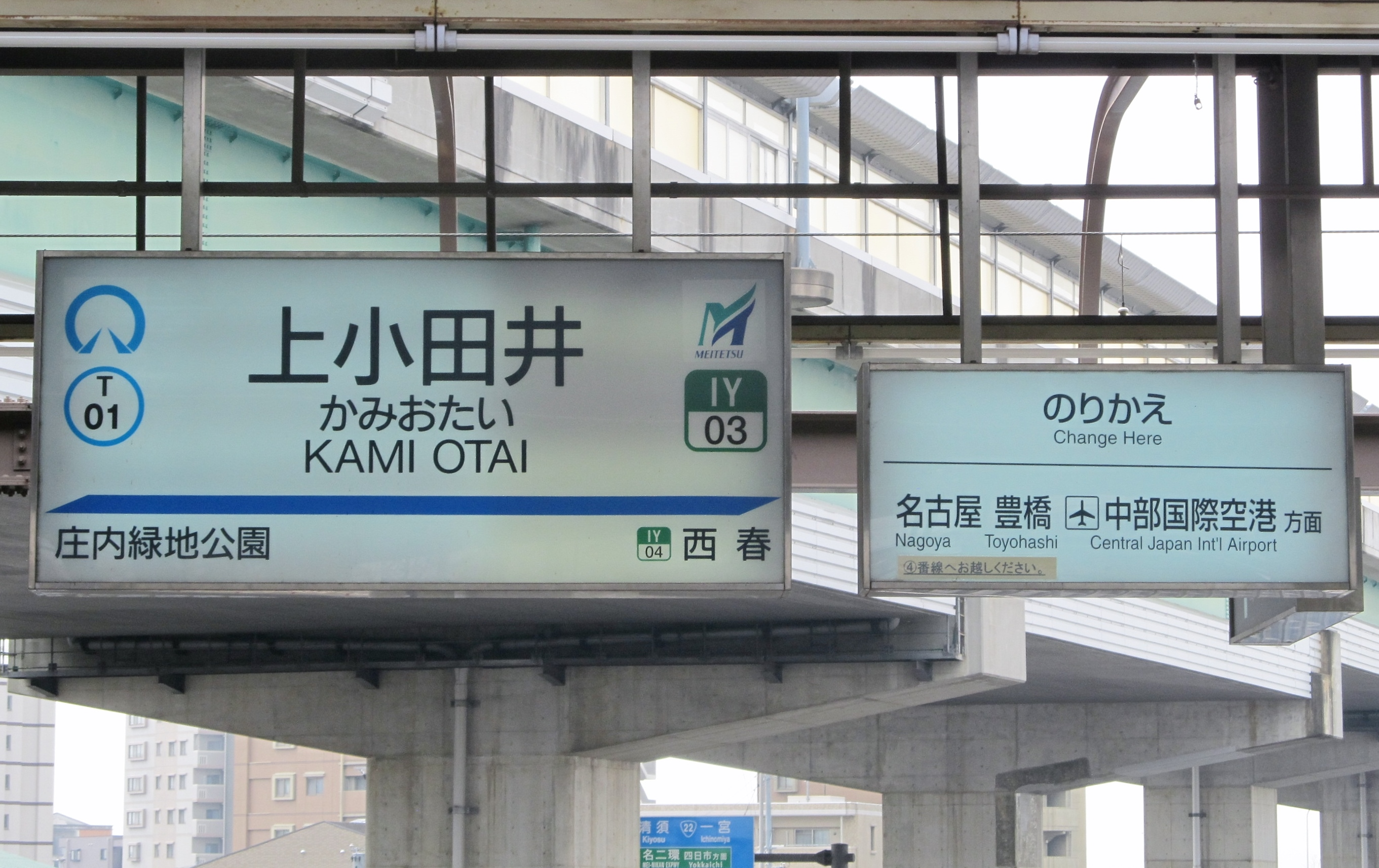
Station signboard at Kami Otai Station, serving through services between the Meitetsu Inuyama Line and the Nagoya Municipal Subway Tsurumai Line.

The Nagoya Municipal Subway maintains extensive interchanges with private railway operators, primarily Meitetsu and Kintetsu, to support regional connectivity within Aichi Prefecture and beyond.

- Meitetsu Nagoya Line: at Nagoya and Kanayama

(for Meitetsu Gifu, Chiryu, Hekinan, Nishio, Higashi Okazaki, Toyohashi, and Toyokawa Inari)

- Meitetsu Tokoname Line: at Nagoya and Kanayama

(for Otagawa, Chita Handa, Kowa, Utsumi, Tokoname, and Central Japan Int'l Airport)

- Meitetsu Inuyama Line: at Nagoya, Kanayama, and Kami-Otai

(for Iwakura, Inuyama, Mikakino and Shin Kani)

- Meitetsu Tsushima Line: at Nagoya and Kanayama

(for Tsushima, Saya and Yatomi)

- Meitetsu Seto Line: at Sakae and Ōzone

(for Owari Seto)

- Meitetsu Toyota Line: at Akaike

(for Toyotashi)

==== Kintetsu ====
- Kintetsu Nagoya Line: at Nagoya and Hatta

(for Yokkaichi, Tsu, Nakagawa, Matsusaka, Ise, Toba, and Osaka)

==== Nagoya Rinkai Rapid Transit ====
- Aonami Line: at Nagoya

(for Kinjo-Futo (Nagoya International Exhibition Hall))

==== Aichi Rapid Transit ====
- Linimo: at Fujigaoka

(for Yakusa, Aichikyūhaku-kinen-kōen (Expo Memorial Park))

== Stations ==
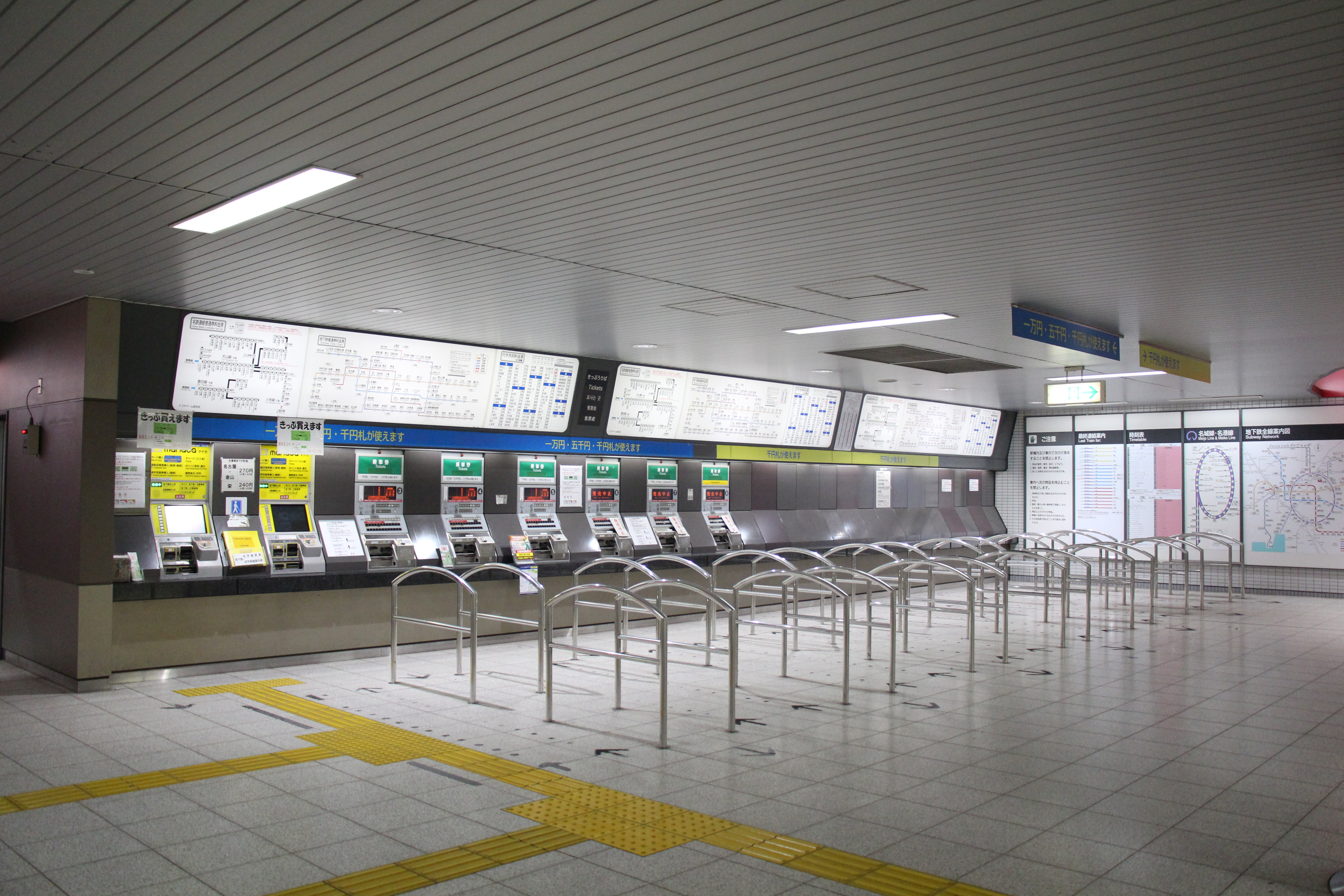
Rail ticket machines at the Nagoya Dome-mae Yada Station.

The Nagoya Municipal Subway is predominantly composed of underground stations, with platforms designed using durable tiles to accommodate high passenger volumes and ensure ease of maintenance. Island platforms are commonly used on loop lines like the Meijō Line, enabling efficient cross-platform transfers and streamlining operations in the city's densely populated areas. The subway’s architectural style reflects modernist influences from the 1960s, as seen in decorative elements such as the colorful murals at Sakae Station, which introduce artistic flair to the system's functional spaces. In response to the 1995 Great Hanshin earthquake in Kobe, new constructions and upgrades incorporated seismic-resistant features, including reinforced concrete and flexible joints, to minimize the risk of damage during earthquakes in the underground sections.

Tunnel construction methods differ by line in response to geological conditions and urban density. For example, the Higashiyama Line primarily utilizes deep-bored tunnels to pass beneath heavily built-up areas, whereas the Sakura-dōri Line was largely constructed using the cut-and-cover technique, allowing for shallower alignments and more accessible construction.

Visual branding plays a role in passenger wayfinding, with each line assigned a distinctive color, such as yellow for the Higashiyama Line and purple for the Meijō Line, consistently applied across maps, signage, and station identifiers. The system’s mascot, Hatchii, introduced in 2002, features prominently in informational and promotional materials. Designed as a friendly, uniformed character drawing inspiration from local imagery, Hatchii is used to promote safety awareness and familiarity with the subway network.

=== Accessibility ===
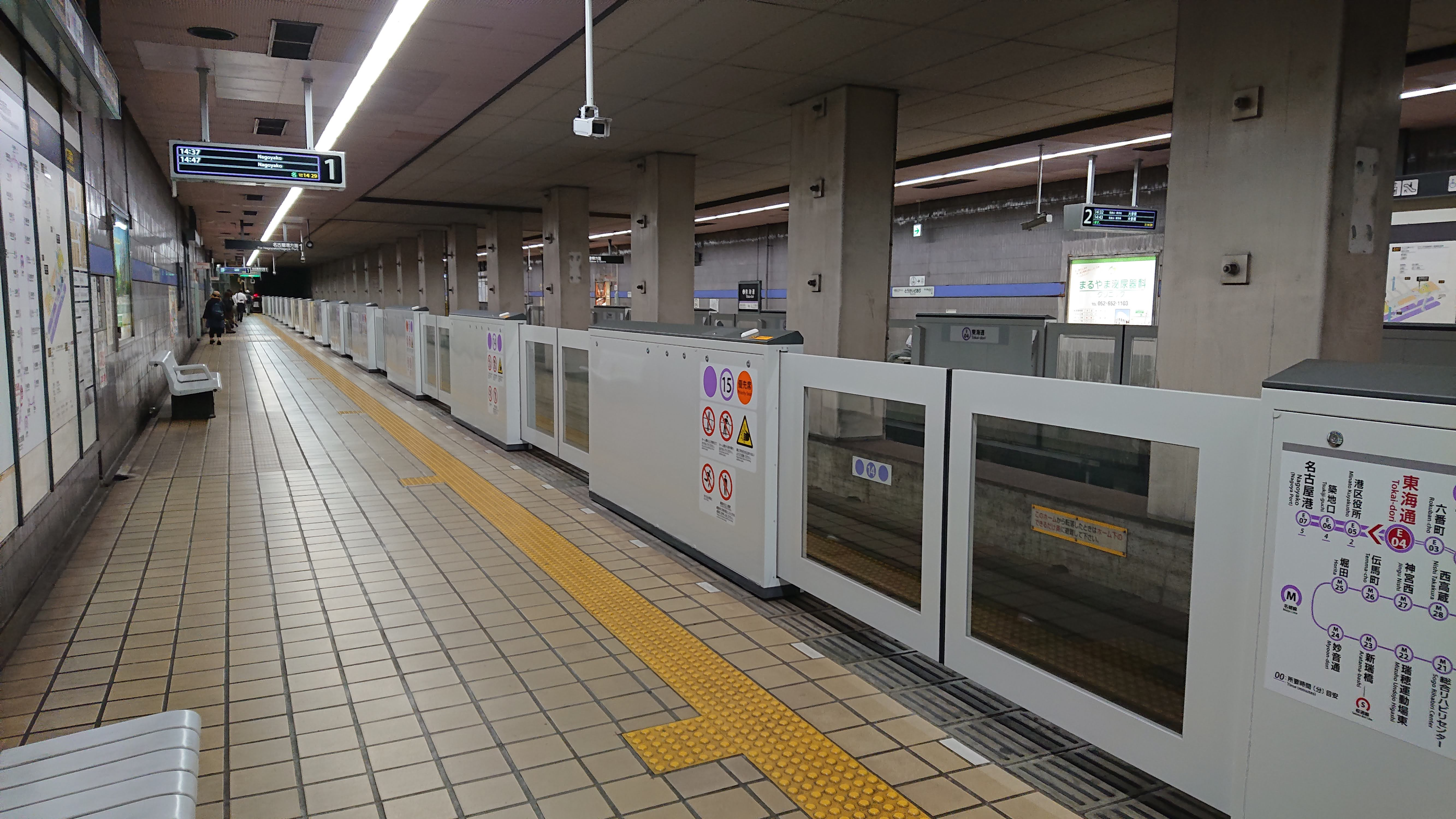
Low-height platform screen doors and CCTV at the Tokai-dori Station.

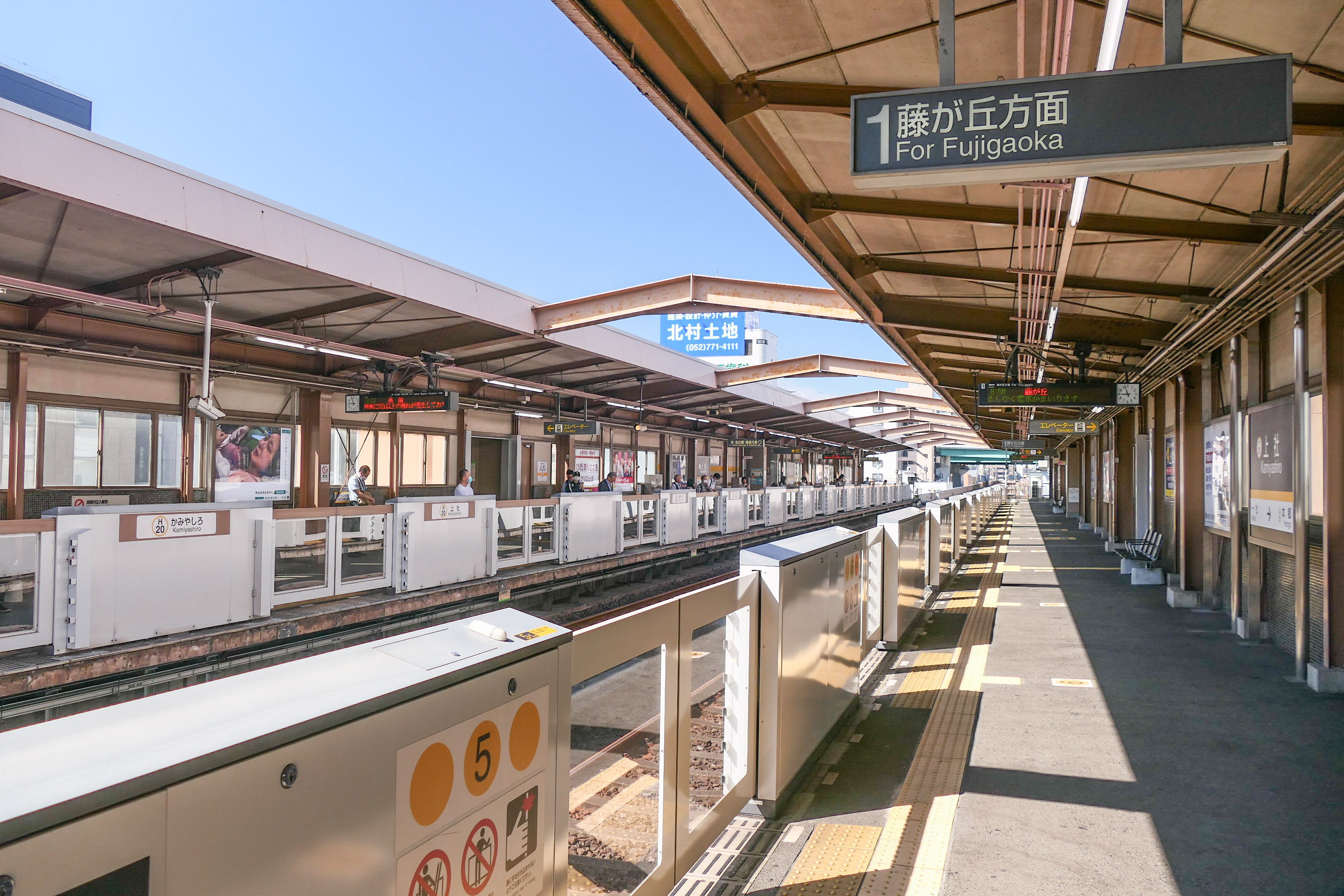
Low-height platform screen doors at the Kamiyashiro Station.

The Nagoya Municipal Subway has implemented comprehensive accessibility measures, including the installation of elevators at all stations to provide step-free routes between street level and platforms for passengers with mobility challenges. Escalators are also extensively installed at station entrances and on platforms, supporting barrier-free circulation throughout the network. Tactile paving for visually impaired users has been progressively introduced, building on early nationwide adoption in Japan beginning in 1967. Further expansions continued into the 2000s, with newer stations such as Nagoya Daigaku (opened in 2003) incorporating tactile guidance along platforms and pedestrian routes to enhance navigability.

Station facilities are designed to improve passenger comfort and usability. All stations are equipped with multipurpose restrooms that include baby-changing tables and ostomate facilities, accommodating families and passengers with specialized needs. Vending machines selling drinks, snacks, and daily necessities are commonly found in station concourses and on platforms. Free internet access is available through the NAGOYA Free Wi-Fi service at 85 stations, with Kami-Otai and Kami-Iida as the only exceptions. To assist international visitors, multilingual signage in English, Chinese, Korean, and other languages is prominently displayed at major interchange stations such as Nagoya Station.

Safety measures form a core component of station operations. Closed-circuit television (CCTV) systems are installed throughout stations and platforms to support security monitoring, and emergency intercoms are provided for rapid communication with staff. Movable platform edge barriers, functioning as half-height screen doors, have been introduced on the Higashiyama, Sakura-dōri, and Kamiida lines to reduce the risk of falls and improve passenger safety. Installation on the Tsurumai Line is ongoing, with the first barriers entering service at Shōnai Ryokuchi Kōen Station in October 2024 and systemwide completion targeted for 2026.

== Rolling stock ==
Route name	Higashiyama Line	Meijo Line and Meiko Line	Tsurumai Line	Sakuradori Line	Kamiiida Line
Official designation	Line 1	Route 2 and Route 4	Route 3	Route 6	Kamiiida Line
Track gauge	Standard gauge 1,435 mm		Narrow gauge 1,067 mm		
Current collection method	Third rail, DC 600 V		Overhead line, DC 1,500 V		
Maximum vehicle dimensions	Compact vehicle (length 15,580 mm / width 2,548 mm / height 3,440 mm)		Large vehicle (length 20,000 mm / width 2,746 mm / height 4,140 mm)		
Train formation	6 cars	6 cars	6 cars	5 cars	4 cars

The standard-gauge routes of the Nagoya Municipal Subway (the Higashiyama, Meijō, and Meikō lines) generally operate 6-car trainsets as their baseline configuration, balancing peak-period capacity requirements with platform length constraints and energy efficiency. Rolling stock on these lines is constructed with lightweight stainless-steel car bodies, offering improved durability and corrosion resistance while lowering long-term maintenance demands relative to earlier aluminum-bodied trains. Traction power is supplied via a 600 V DC third-rail system using shoe-type current collectors, allowing reliable operation throughout the predominantly underground network.

The narrow-gauge routes of the Nagoya Municipal Subway (the Tsurumai, Sakura-dōri, and Kamiiida lines) are built to a 1,067 mm track gauge and are electrified using a 1,500 V DC overhead catenary system, with trains collecting power via pantographs. The Tsurumai and Sakura-dōri lines operate primarily with 5- and 6-car trainsets, while the shorter Kamiiida Line uses 4-car formations suited to its service patterns and through-running with the Meitetsu Komaki Line. Despite the narrower gauge, rolling stock on these lines features relatively wide car bodies, measuring approximately 2.8 meters, to optimize passenger capacity. Interior and exterior designs incorporate accessibility understandings such as low-step boarding, priority seating for elderly and mobility-impaired passengers, and LED lighting to enhance visibility and energy efficiency.

=== Current vehicles ===
- Higashiyama Line
  - 5050 series
  - N1000 series
- Meijo Line and Meiko Line
  - 2000 series
- Tsurumai Line
  - 3050 series
  - N3000 series
- Sakuradori Line
  - 6000 series
  - 6050 series
- Kamiiida Line
  - 7000 series
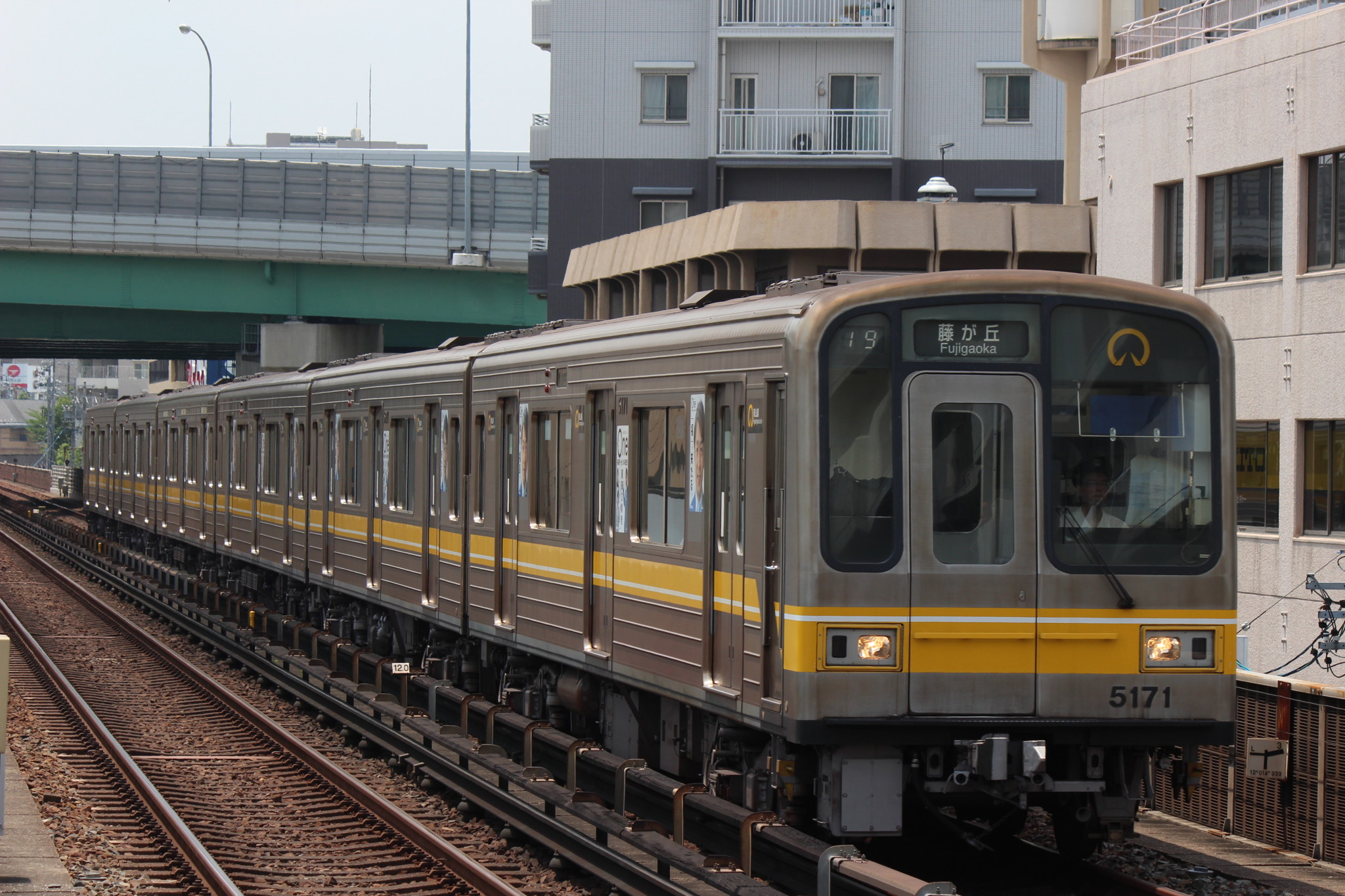
5050 series

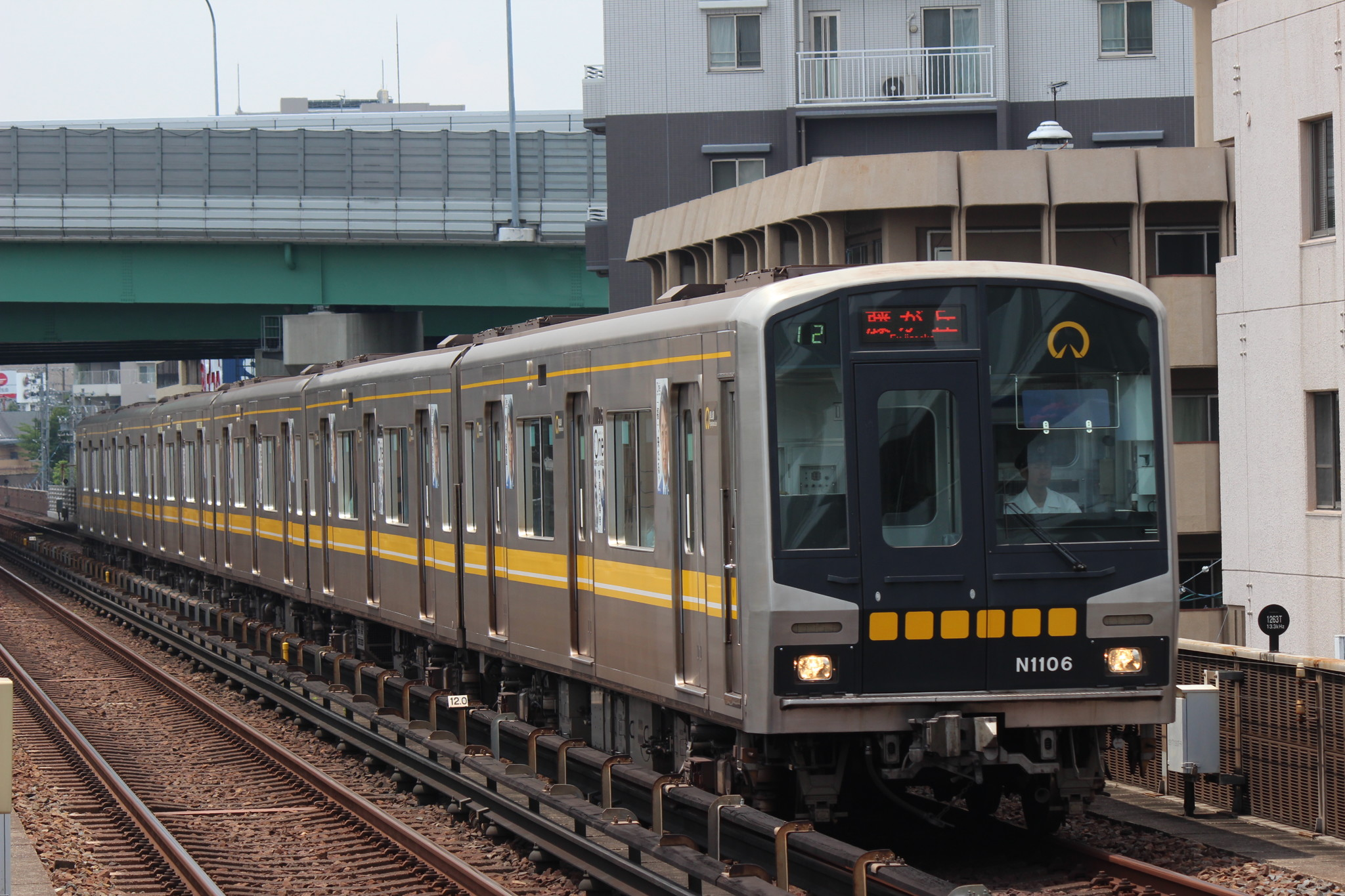
N1000 series

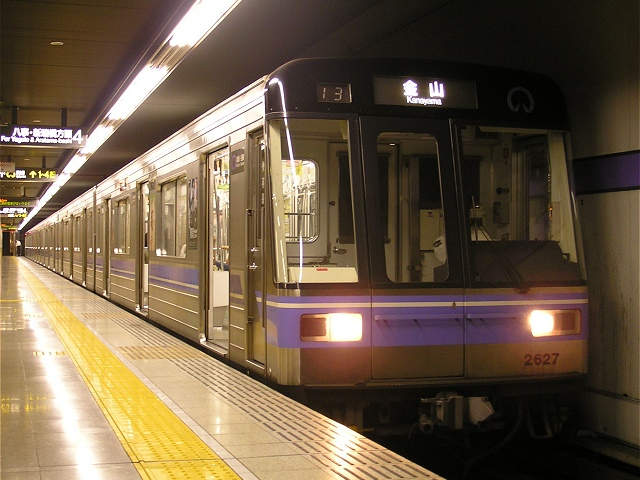
2000 series

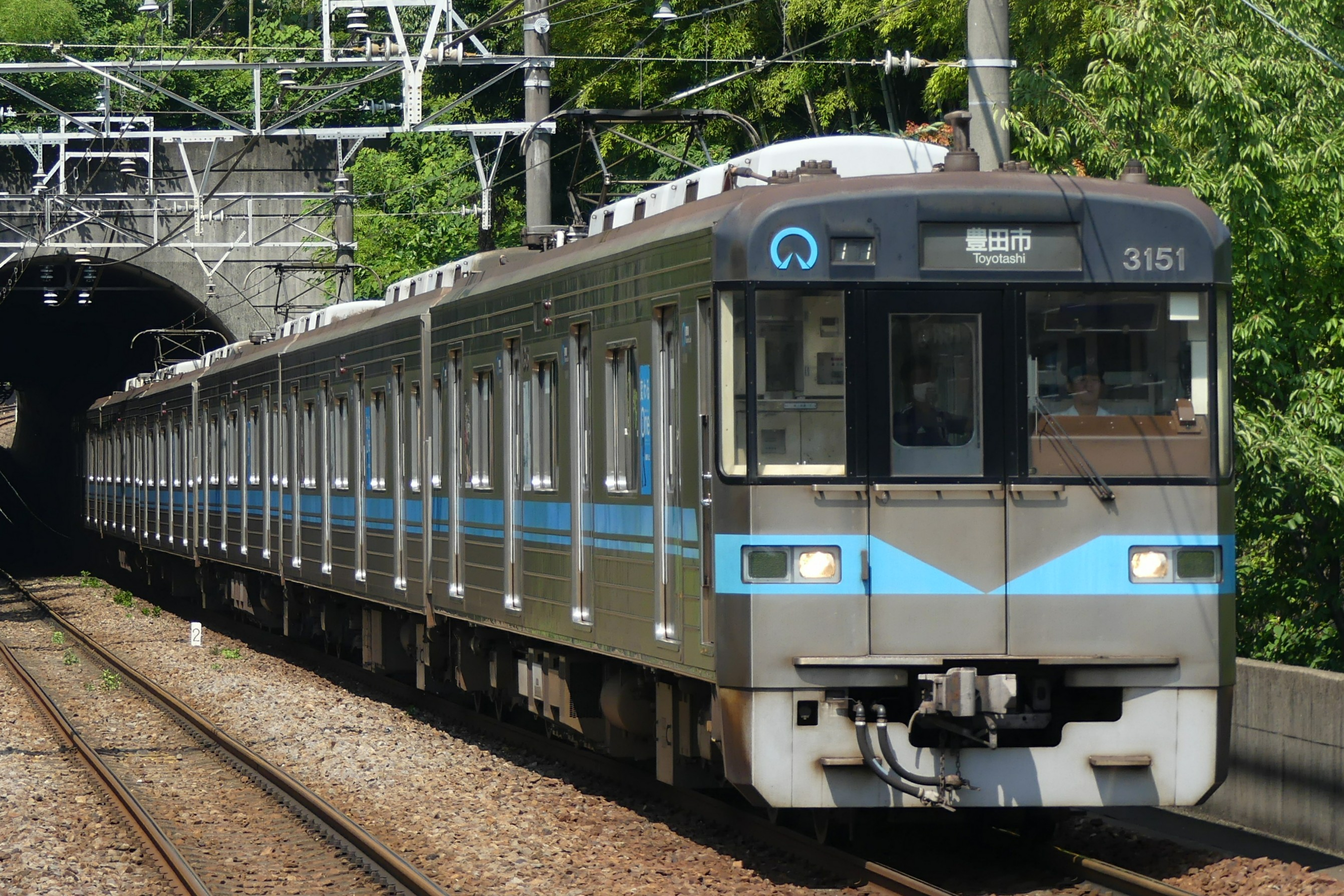
3050 series

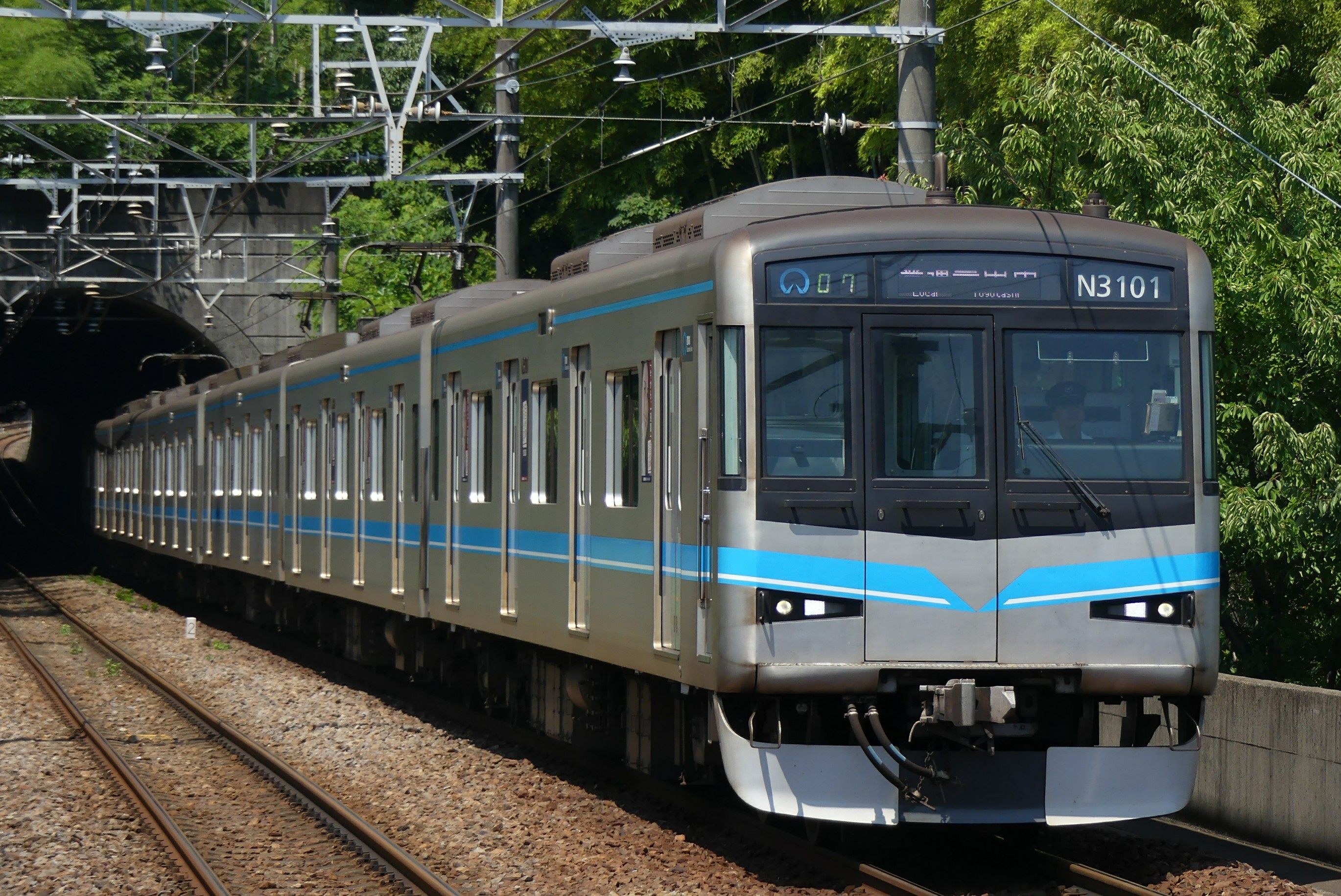
N3000 series

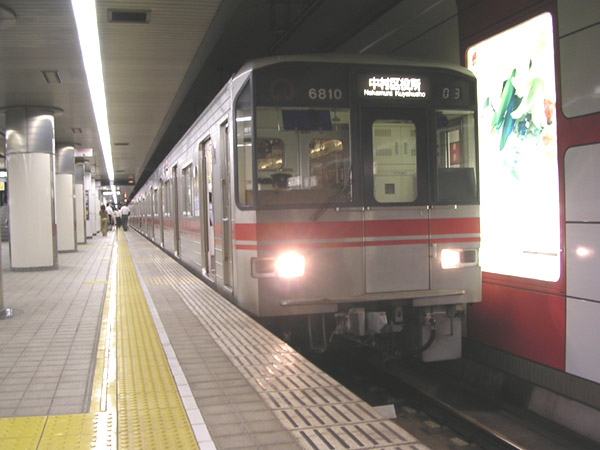
6000 series

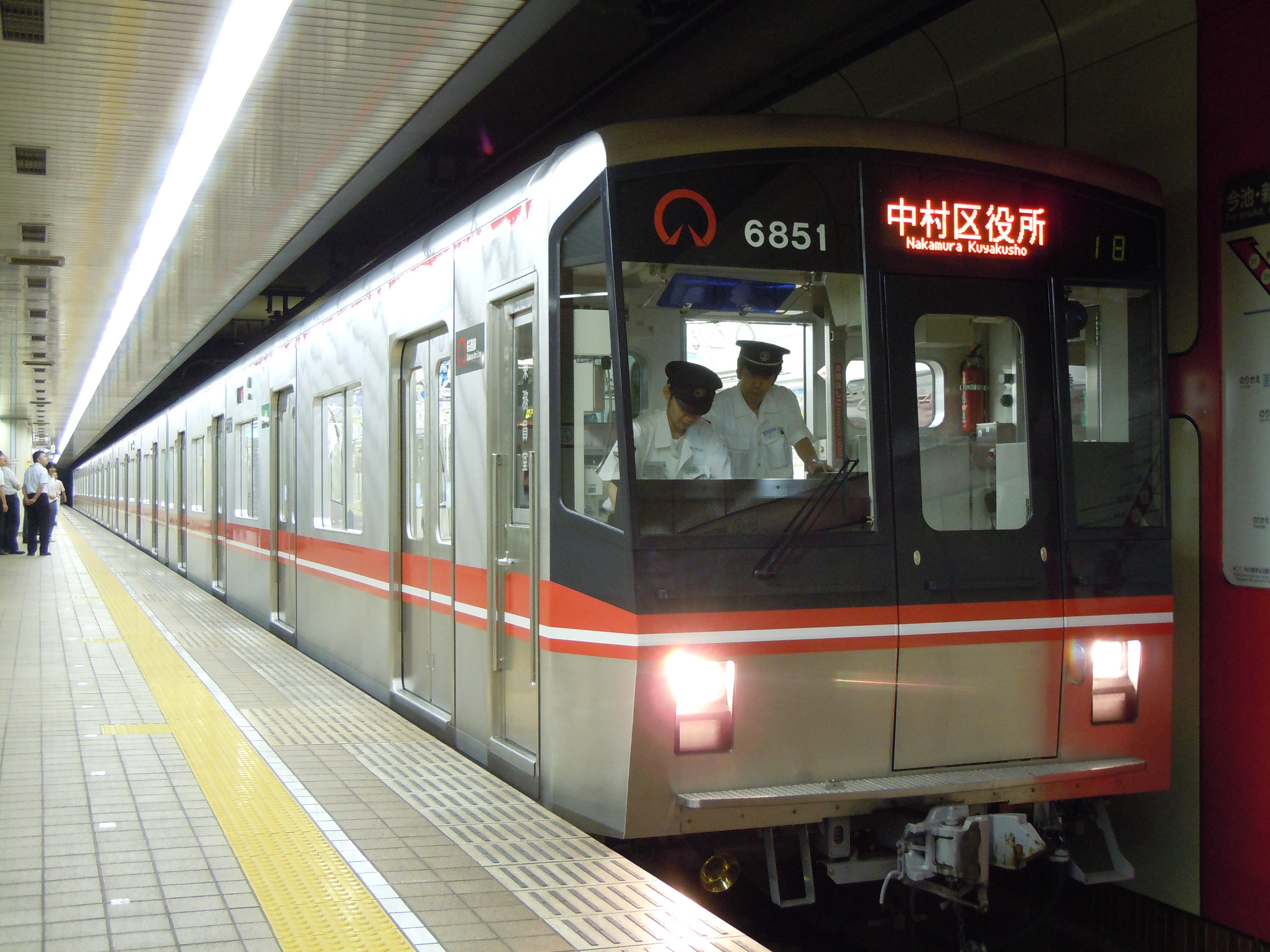
6050 series

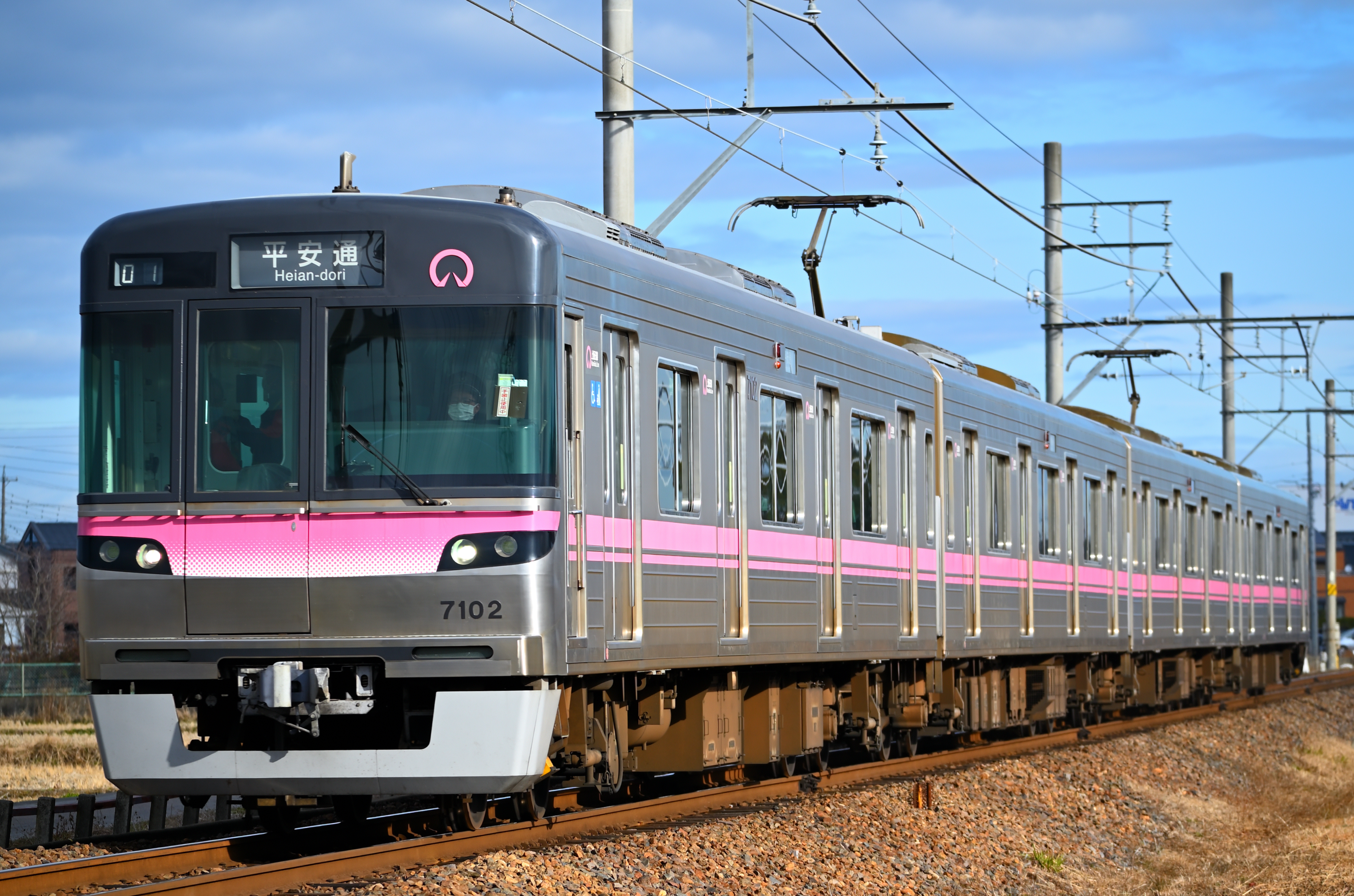
7000 series

=== Abolished vehicles ===
- Higashiyama Line
  - 5000 series
- Tsurumai Line
  - 3000 series
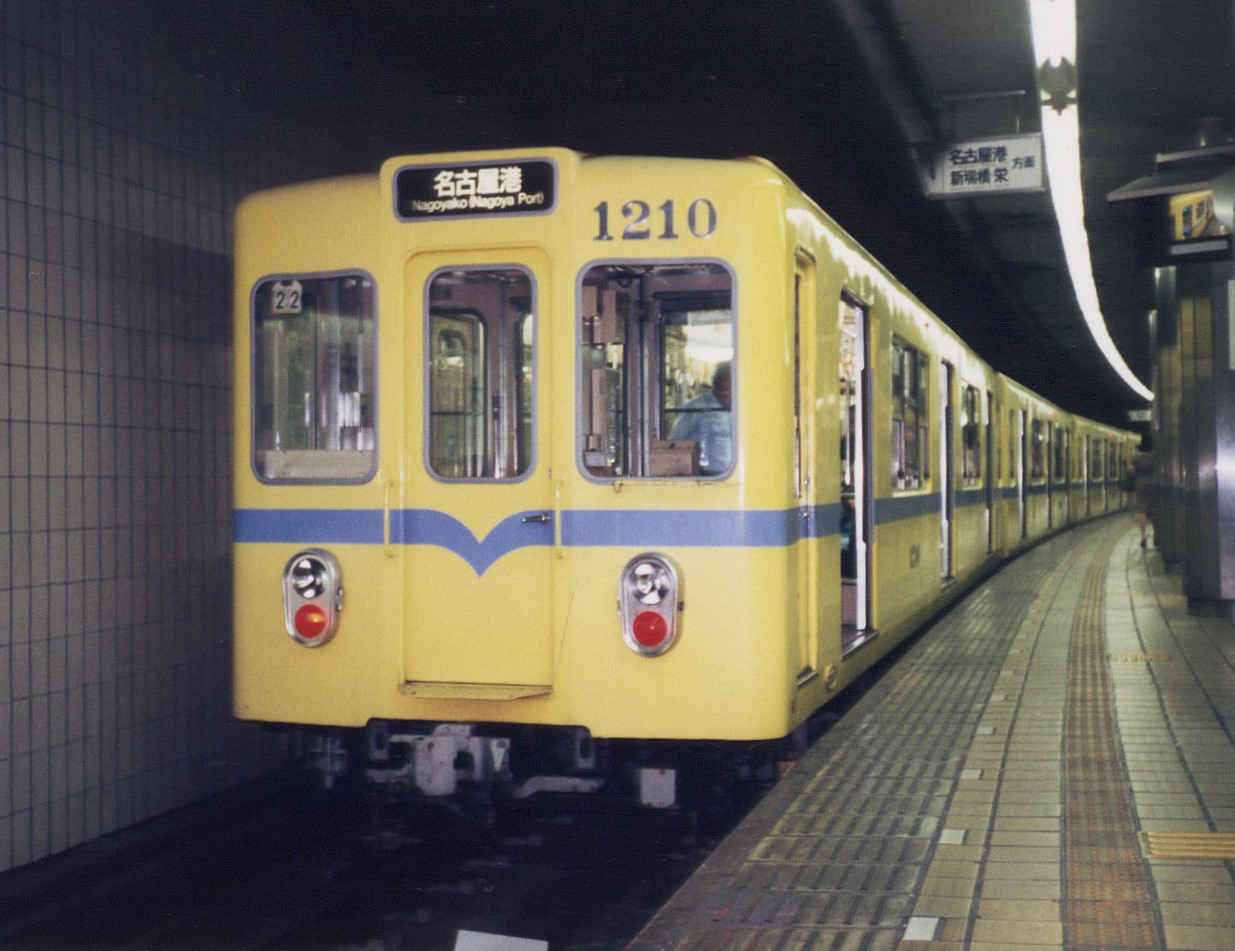
1000 series

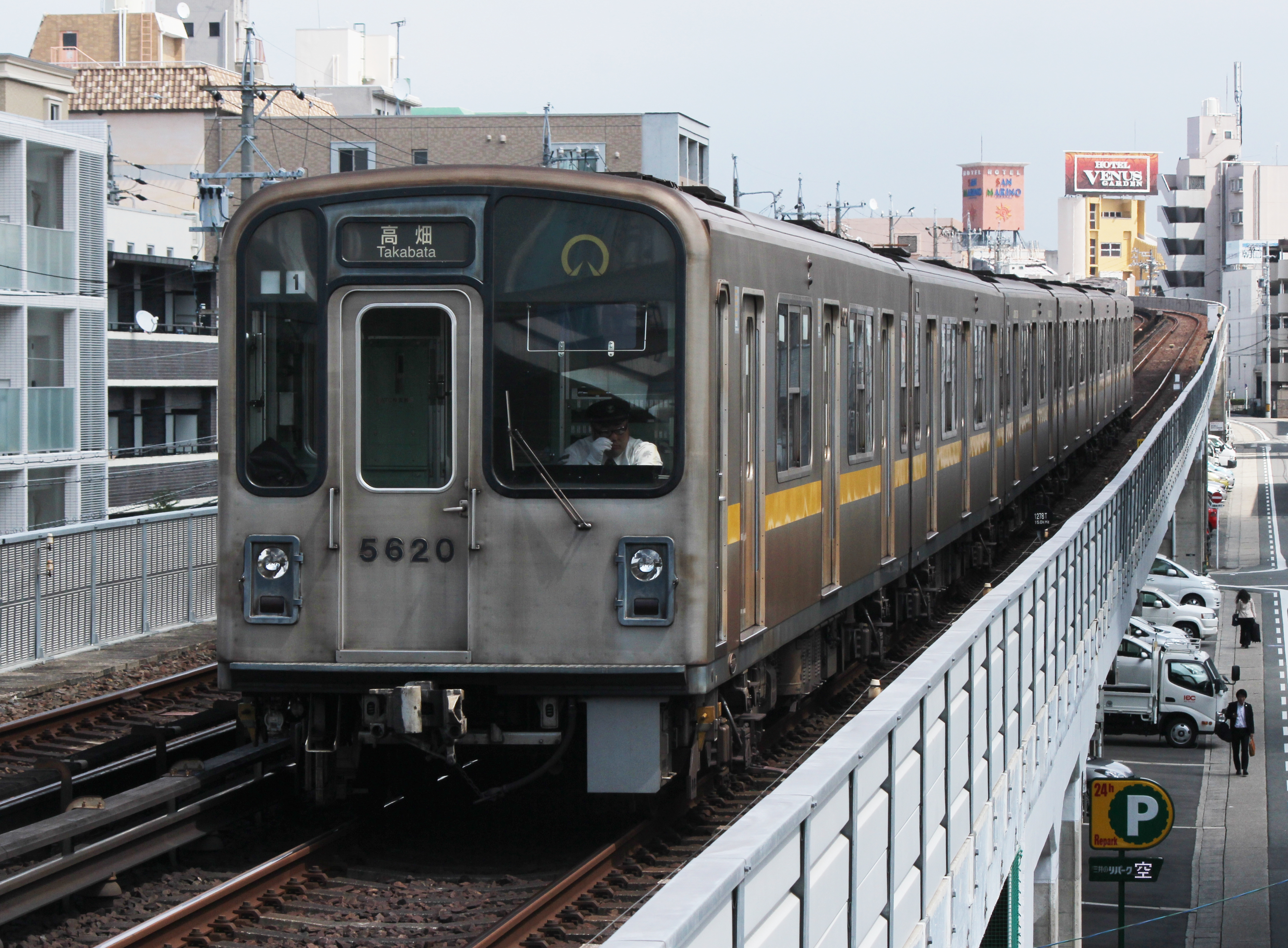
5000 series

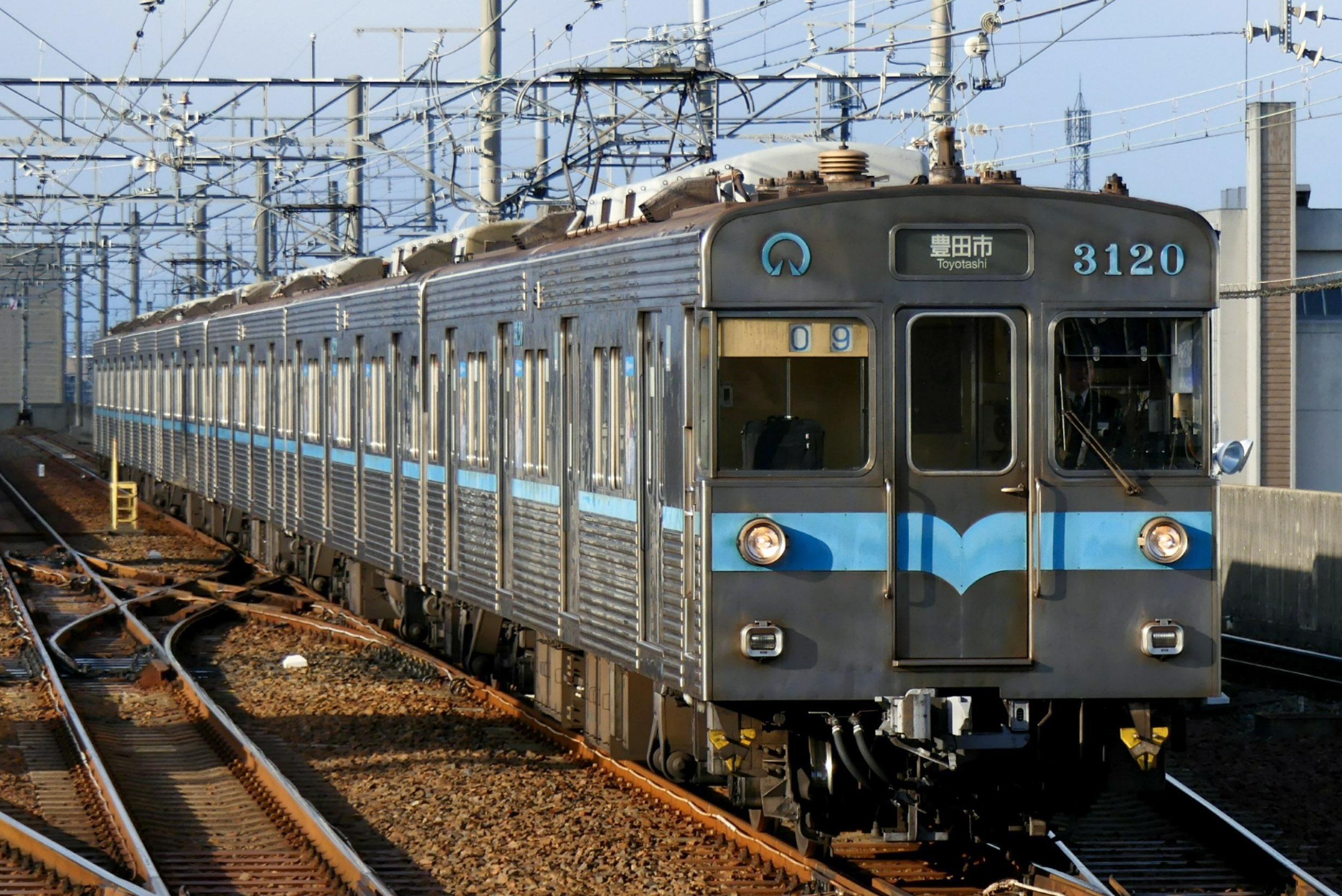
3000 series

== See also ==
- List of metro systems
