= 3050 series =

3050 series may refer to:

== Japanese train types ==
- Keisei 3050 series EMU
- Nagoya Municipal Subway 3050 series EMU
