= 3050 =

3050 may refer to:

- 3050, a number in the 3000 (number) range
- A.D. 3050, a year of the 4th millennium CE
- 3050 BC, a year in the 4th millennium BCE

== Roads numbered 3050 ==
- Hawaii Route 3050, a state highway
- Louisiana Highway 3050, a state highway
- Texas Farm to Market Road 3050, a state highway
- A3050 road (Great Britain)

== Other uses ==
- 3050 Carrera, an asteroid in the Asteroid Belt, the 3050th asteroid registered
- Keisei 3050 series electric multiple unit train series
- Nagoya Municipal Subway 3050 series electric multiple unit train series
