= Tsurumai Line =

Subway line in Nagoya, Japan

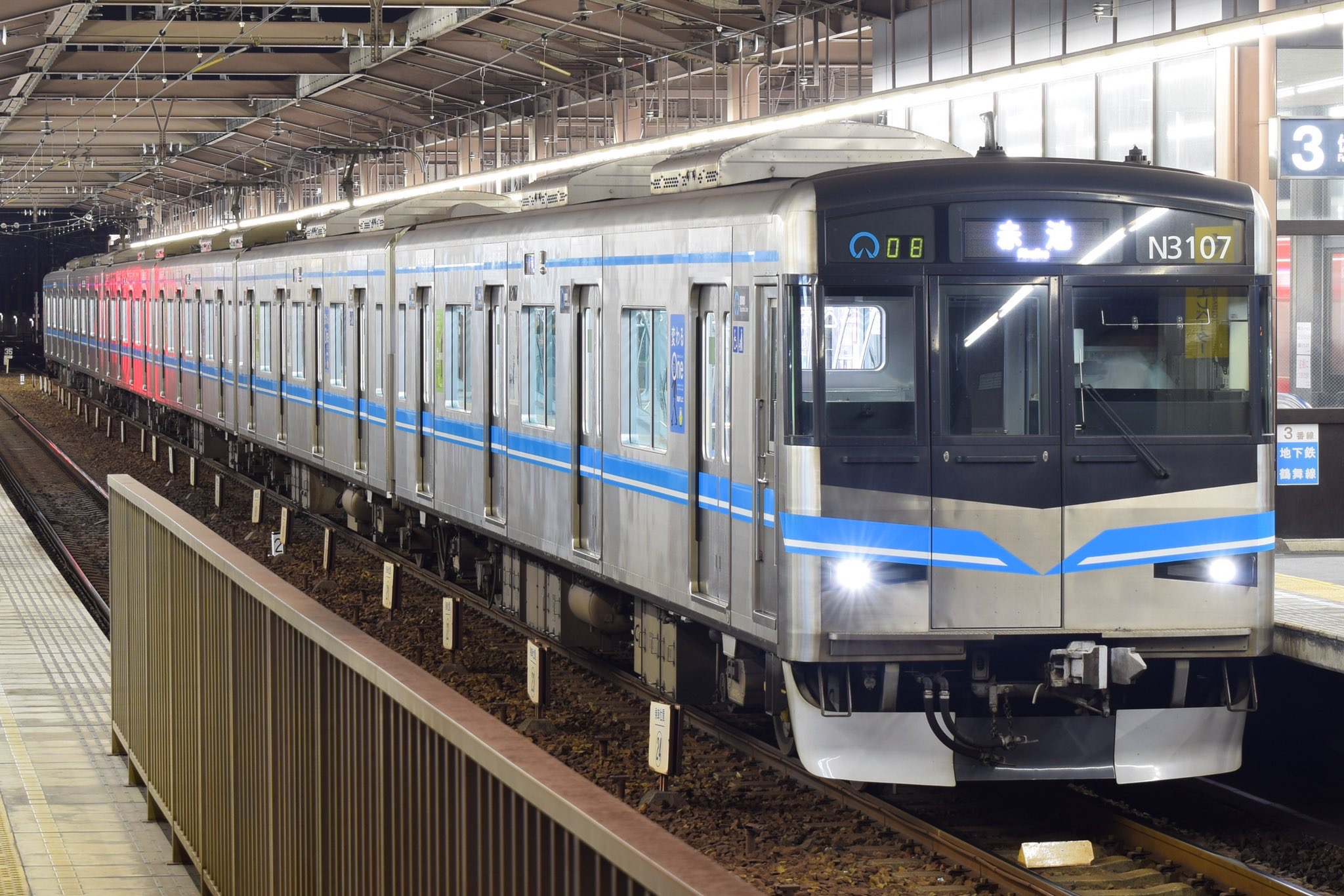
- Nagoya Municipal Subway N3000 series at Kami Otai Station

Overview
- Locale: Nagoya, Japan
- Termini: Kami-Otai; Akaike
- Stations: 20

Service
- Type: Rapid transit
- System: Nagoya Municipal Subway
- Operator: Nagoya City Transportation Bureau
- Depot: Akaike
- Rolling stock: 3050 series N3000 series
- Daily ridership: 197,082 (2008)

History
- Opened: 18 March 1977; 49 years ago
- Last extension: 1993

Technical
- Track length: 20.4 km (12.7 mi)
- Track gauge: 1,067 mm (3 ft 6 in)
- Electrification: 1,500V DC overhead line
- Operating speed: 75 km/h (45 mph)

The Tsurumai Line (鶴舞線, Tsurumai-sen) is a subway line in Nagoya, Japan, part of the Nagoya Municipal Subway system. It runs from Kami-Otai in Nishi-ku, Nagoya to Akaike in Nisshin. The Tsurumai Line's color on maps is light blue and stations are labeled with the prefix "T". Officially, the line is called the Nagoya City Rapid Railway Line 3 (名古屋市高速度鉄道第3号線, Nagoya-shi Kōsokudo Tetsudō Dai-san-gō-sen).

The line opened its first section in 1977. The line has through services with the Meitetsu Inuyama, Toyota and Mikawa Lines. It is currently the only subway line to leave the Nagoya city limits.

== Stations ==
All stations are in Aichi Prefecture, with one of them outside Nagoya's city limits.

No.	Station name	Japanese	Distance (km)		Transfers	Location
No.	Station name	Japanese	Between stations	Total	Transfers	Location
↑ Through-services to/from Iwakura, Fusō, from Hotei, to/from Inuyama via the Inuyama Line ↑
T01	Kami-Otai	上小田井	-	0.0	Meitetsu Inuyama Line; JR-Central Transport Service Jōhoku Line (Otai)	Nishi-ku, Nagoya
T02	Shōnai Ryokuchi Kōen	庄内緑地公園	1.4	1.4		Nishi-ku, Nagoya
T03	Shōnai-dōri	庄内通	1.3	2.7		Nishi-ku, Nagoya
T04	Jōshin	浄心	1.4	4.1		Nishi-ku, Nagoya
T05	Sengen-chō	浅間町	0.8	4.9		Nishi-ku, Nagoya
T06	Marunouchi	丸の内	1.4	6.3	Sakura-dōri Line (S-04)	Naka-ku, Nagoya
T07	Fushimi	伏見	0.7	7.0	Higashiyama Line (H-09)	Naka-ku, Nagoya
T08	Ōsu Kannon	大須観音	0.8	7.8		Naka-ku, Nagoya
T09	Kamimaezu	上前津	1.0	8.8	Meijō Line (M-03)	Naka-ku, Nagoya
T10	Tsurumai	鶴舞	0.9	9.7	Chūō Main Line	Naka-ku, Nagoya
T11	Arahata	荒畑	1.3	11.0		Shōwa-ku, Nagoya
T12	Gokiso	御器所	0.9	11.9	Sakura-dōri Line (S-10)	Shōwa-ku, Nagoya
T13	Kawana	川名	1.2	13.1		Shōwa-ku, Nagoya
T14	Irinaka	いりなか	1.0	14.1		Shōwa-ku, Nagoya
T15	Yagoto	八事	0.9	15.0	Meijō Line (M-20)	Shōwa-ku, Nagoya
T16	Shiogama-guchi	塩釜口	1.4	16.4		Tempaku-ku, Nagoya
T17	Ueda	植田	1.2	17.6		Tempaku-ku, Nagoya
T18	Hara	原	0.8	18.4		Tempaku-ku, Nagoya
T19	Hirabari	平針	0.9	19.3		Tempaku-ku, Nagoya
T20	Akaike	赤池	1.1	20.4	Meitetsu Toyota Line	Nisshin
↓ Through-services to/from Toyotashi via the Toyota Line and Mikawa Line ↓

== Rolling stock ==
- 3050 series (since 1993)
- N3000 series (since 16 March 2012)
- Meitetsu 100 series (on through-running services)
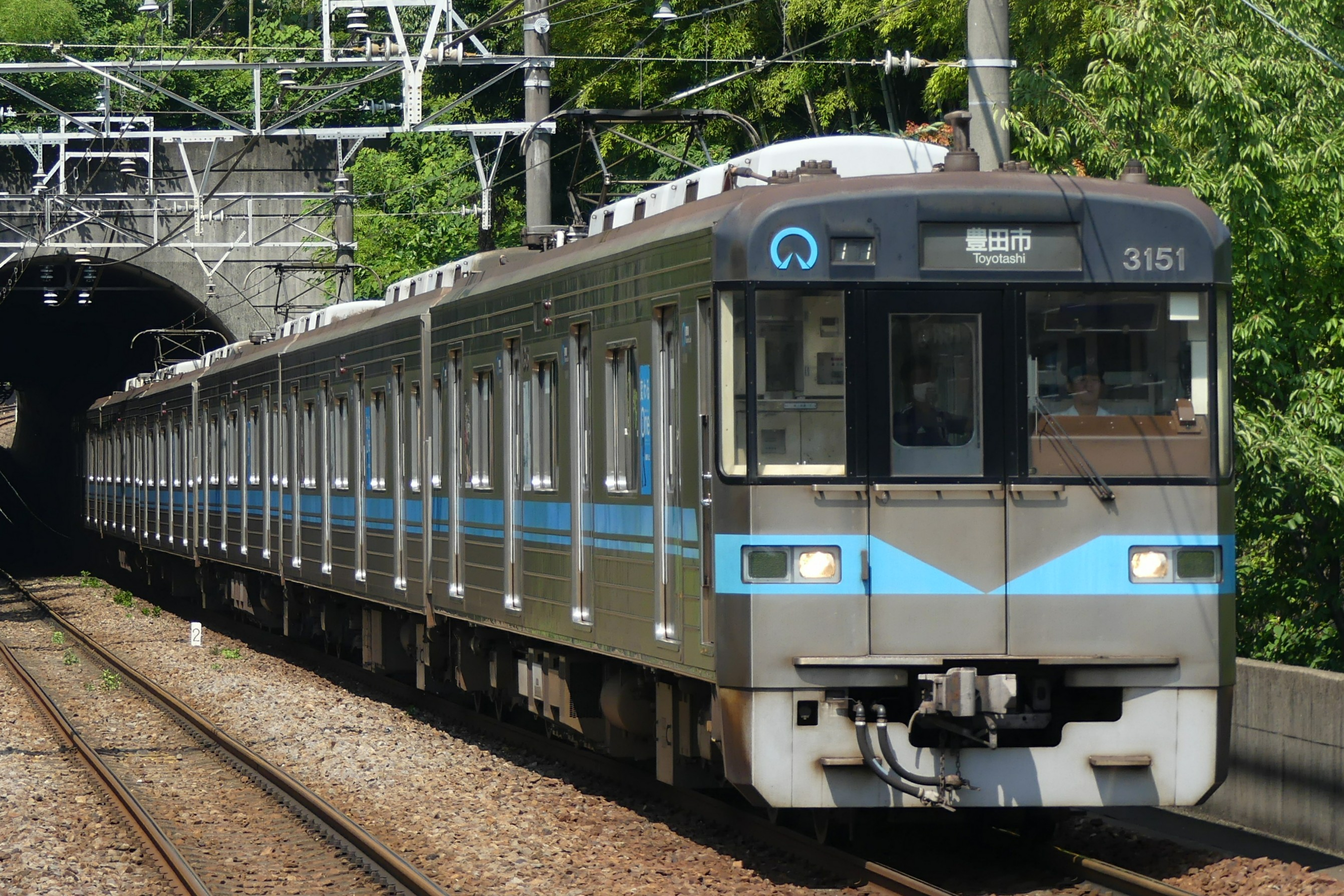
3050 series

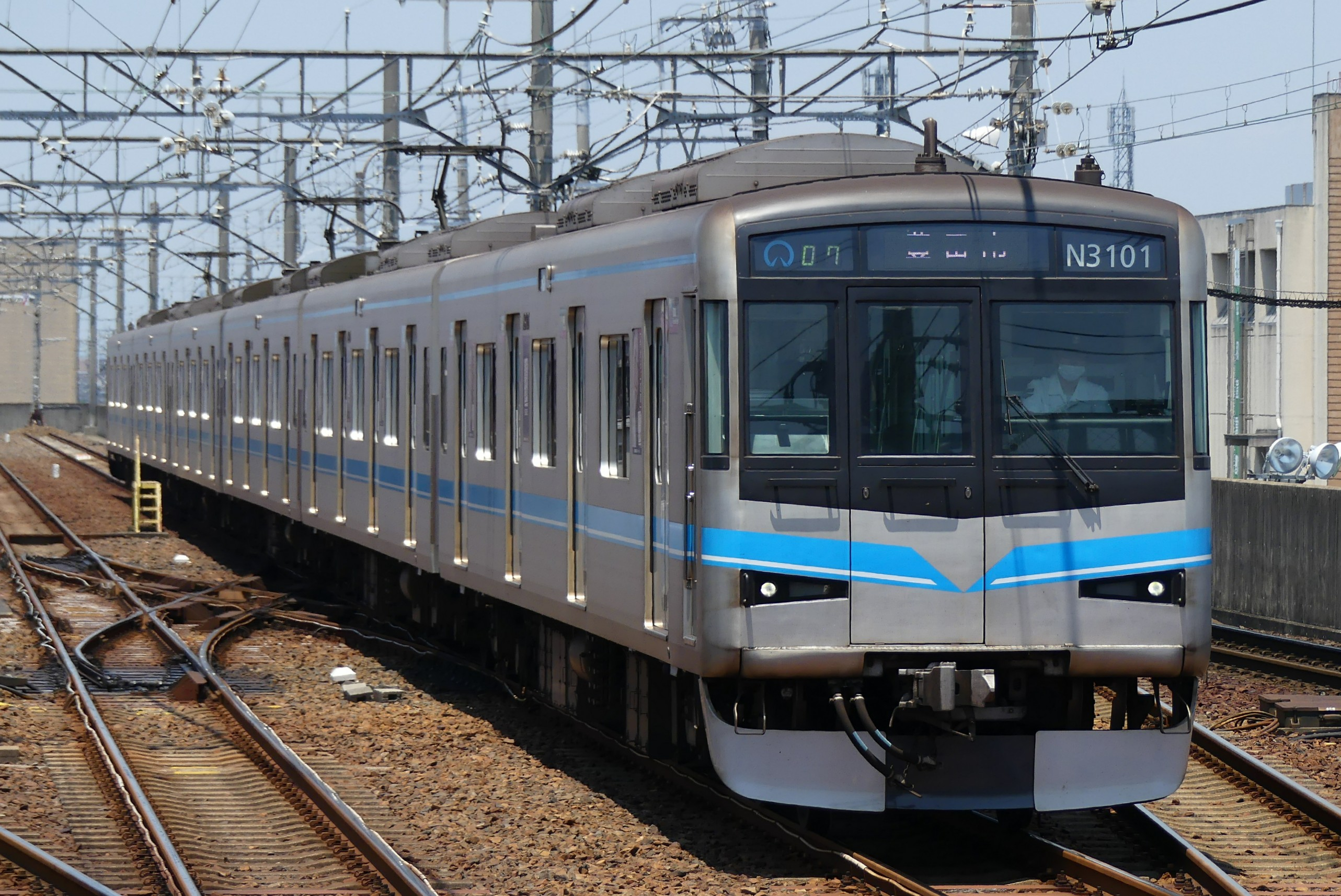
N3000 series

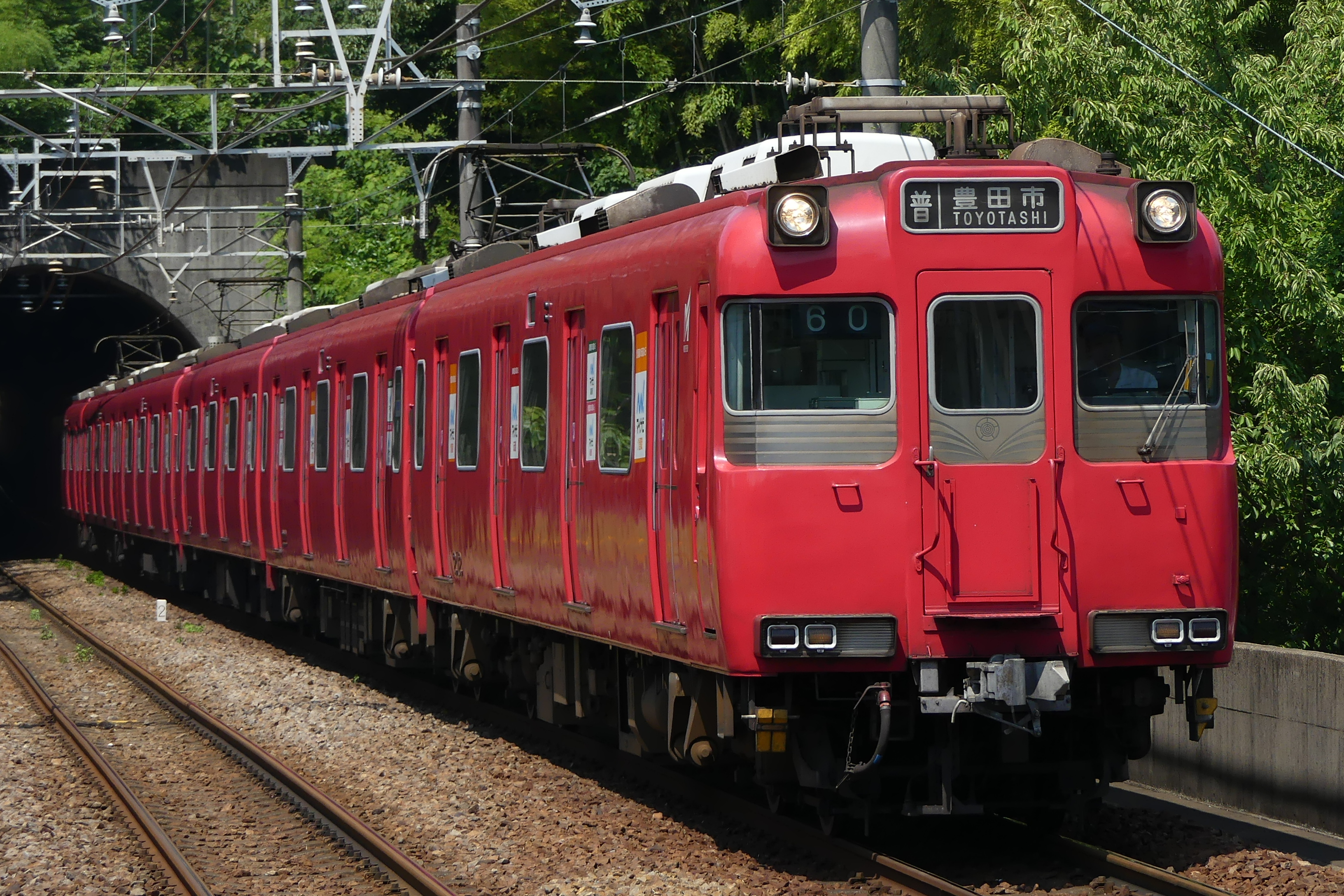
Meitetsu 100 series

=== Former ===
- 3000 series (1977–2023)
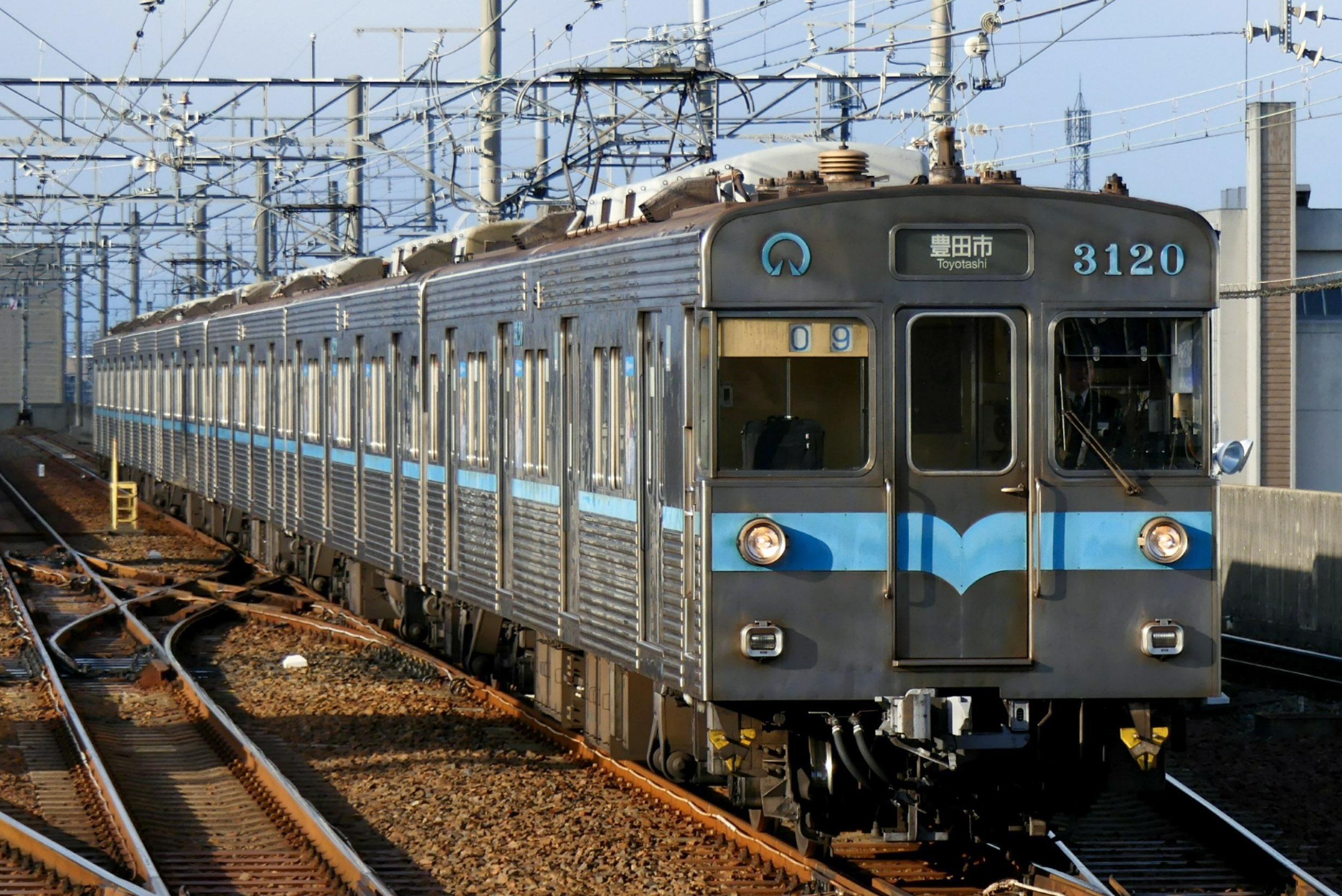
3000 series

=== Planned ===
- Meitetsu 500 series (from fiscal 2026)

== See also ==
- List of railway lines in Japan
