= Hatchii =

Mascot for Nagoya Municipal Subway, Japan

Hatchii ハッチー
- First appearance: August 1, 2002

In-universe information
- Species: Shachihoko
- Gender: Unknown
- Occupation: Nagoya Municipal Subway
- Nationality: Japanese

Hatchii (ハッチー) is a fictional character which serves as the mascot for Nagoya Municipal Subway.

== Inspiration ==
Maruhachi

Nagoya Municipal Subway adopted the character named Hatchii to commemorate their 80th year of operation on August 1, 2002. The character has a human form wearing the uniform of an employee of Nagoya City Subway, with the head of a Shachihoko, a mythical character which is often used to represent Nagoya. In particular, Nagoya Castle is famous for its large, golden figures of Shachihoko. The name is a combination of the "shachi" in Shachihoko and the "hachi" in Maruhachi, which is the official symbol of Nagoya.
