= Nagoya Municipal Subway N3000 series =

Japanese train type

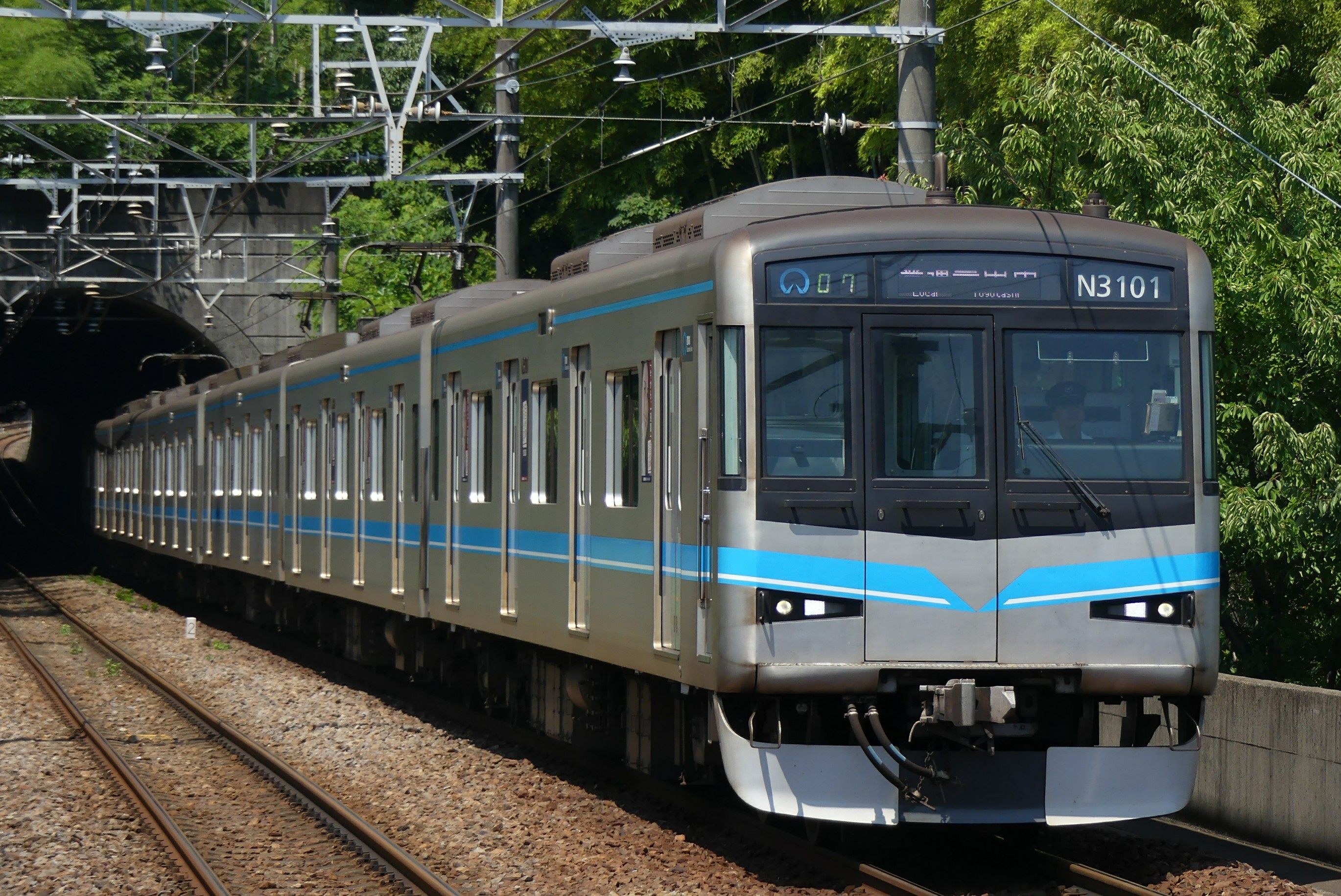
- An N3000 series trainset in 2019
- In service: 2012–present
- Manufacturers: Hitachi (N3101), Nippon Sharyo (N3102–)
- Family name: A-train (N3101 only)
- Replaced: 3000 series
- Constructed: 2011–2022
- Entered service: 16 March 2012
- Number built: 96 vehicles (16 sets)
- Number in service: 96 vehicles (16 sets)
- Formation: 6 cars per trainset
- Fleet numbers: N3101–N3116
- Operator: Transportation Bureau City of Nagoya
- Lines served: Tsurumai Line, Meitetsu Inuyama Line, Meitetsu Toyota Line, Meitetsu Mikawa Line

Specifications
- Car body construction: Aluminium (N3101), stainless steel (N3102–)
- Train length: 120 m (393 ft 8 in)
- Car length: 20,000 mm (65 ft 7 in)
- Width: 2,746 mm (9 ft 0.1 in)
- Height: 4,067 mm (13 ft 4.1 in)
- Floor height: 1,090 mm (3 ft 7 in)
- Doors: 4 pairs per side (width: 1,300 mm (51 in))
- Maximum speed: 120 km/h (75 mph) (design); 100 km/h (62 mph) (service)
- Traction system: Toyo Denki RG6011-A-M 2-level IGBT–VVVF
- Traction motors: 12 × HS32534-19RB 170 kW (228 hp) 3-phase AC induction motor
- Power output: 2.04 MW (2,736 hp)
- Acceleration: 3.0 km/(h⋅s) (1.9 mph/s)
- Deceleration: 3.5 km/(h⋅s) (2.2 mph/s) (service); 4.0 km/(h⋅s) (2.5 mph/s) (emergency)
- Electric systems: 1,500 V DC (overhead catenary)
- Current collection: Pantograph
- UIC classification: 2′2′+Bo′Bo′+Bo′Bo′+2′2′+Bo′Bo′+2′2′
- Bogies: SS176M (powered), SS176T (trailer)
- Safety system: ATS/ATC
- Track gauge: 1,067 mm (3 ft 6 in)

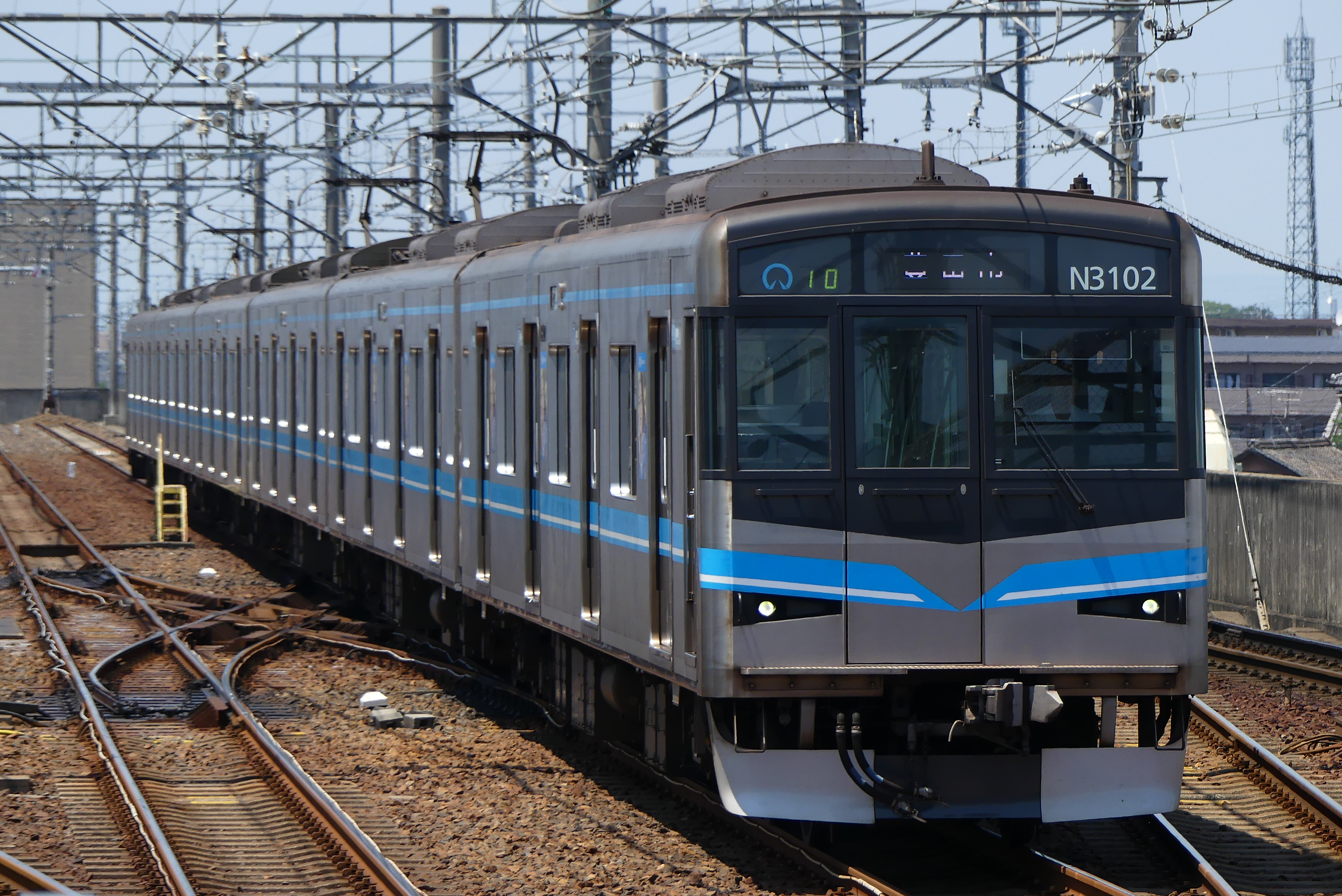
Nippon Sharyo-built set N3102 in July 2018

The Nagoya Municipal Subway N3000 series (名古屋市交通局N3000形) is a rapid transit electric multiple unit (EMU) train type operated by the Transportation Bureau City of Nagoya on the Nagoya Subway Tsurumai Line in Japan since March 2012.

== Formation ==
As of 1 April 2015, the fleet consists of four six-car sets, N3101 to N3104, formed as follows, with three motored ("M") cars and three non-powered trailer ("T") cars. (Weights are for the aluminium-bodied first set, N3101.)

Designation	Tc1	M1	M2	T1	M3	Tc2
Numbering	N3100	N3200	N3300	N3400	N3700	N3800
Weight (t)	28.1	32.9	32.1	26.3	32.9	28.3
Capacity (total/seated)	136/45	147/51	147/51	147/51	147/51	136/45

The M1, M2, and M3 cars are each equipped with a single-arm pantograph.

== Interior ==
The trains feature longitudinal bench seating throughout with blue moquette seat covers, and red moquette for priority seating at the ends of cars. The moquette incorporates a pattern based on Arimatsu tie-dyeing designs for which Nagoya is famous. 17-inch wide-aspect LCD passenger information displays are provided above alternate doorways, with four per car.

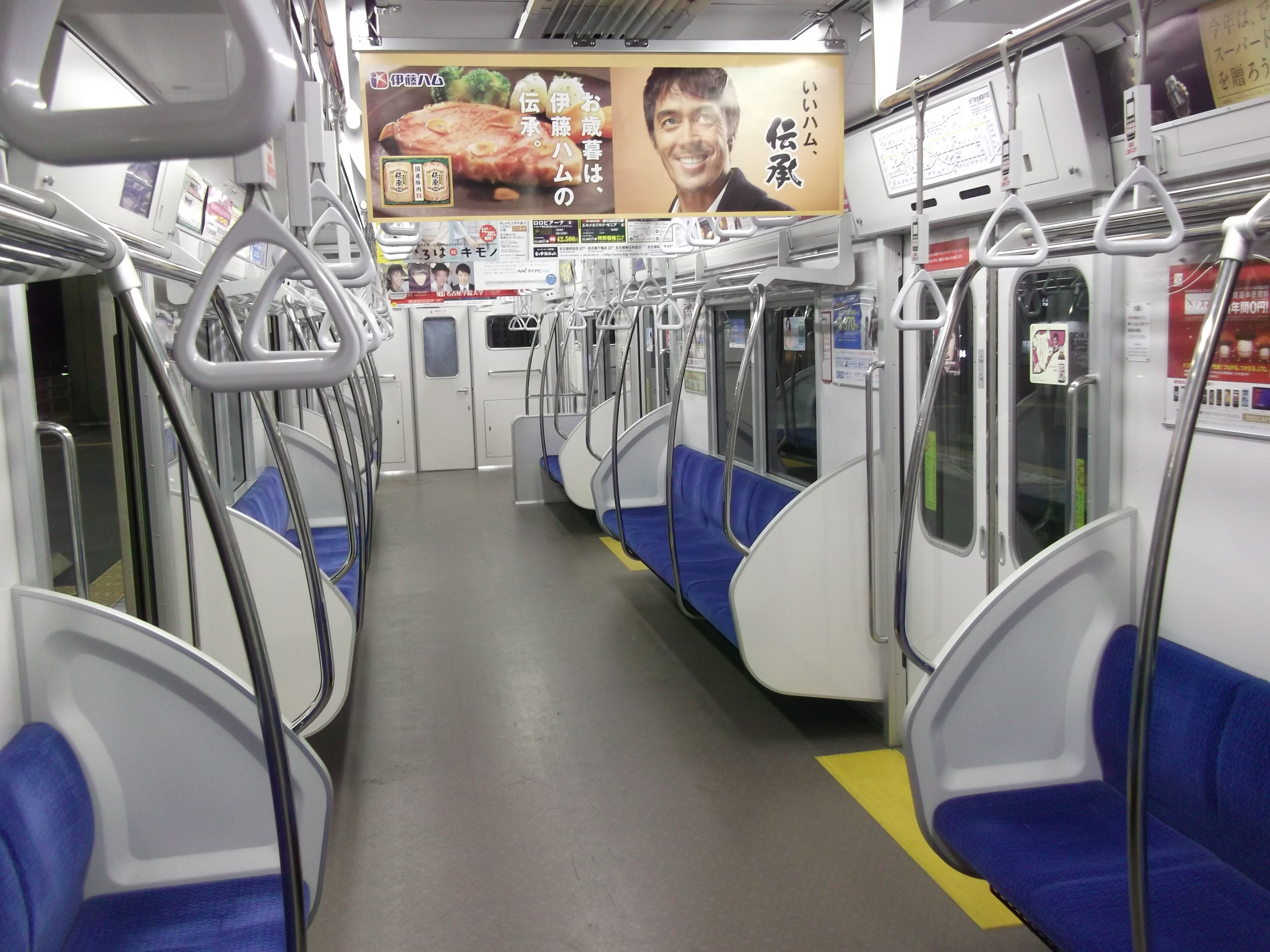
Interior view, December 2012

== History ==
The first set, N3101, was delivered from Hitachi's factory in Kudamatsu, Yamaguchi in October 2011. It entered revenue service from 16 March 2012. The second set, N3102, was built at Nippon Sharyo's factory in Toyokawa, Aichi, and delivered in May 2012.

== Build details ==
The build histories of individual sets are as follows. Set N3101 has an aluminium body, while sets N3102 onward have stainless steel bodies.

Set No.	Manufacturer	Date delivered
N3101	Hitachi	27 October 2011
N3102	Nippon Sharyo	31 May 2012
N3103	Nippon Sharyo	31 July 2013
N3104	Nippon Sharyo	30 May 2014
N3105	Nippon Sharyo	May 2015
N3106	Nippon Sharyo	May 2016
N3107	Nippon Sharyo	June 2016
N3108	Nippon Sharyo	July 2017
N3109	Nippon Sharyo	August 2017
N3110	Nippon Sharyo	July 2019
N3111	Nippon Sharyo	September 2019
N3112	Nippon Sharyo	November 2020
N3113	Nippon Sharyo	2021
