= Nagoya Municipal Subway 3000 series =

Japanese train type

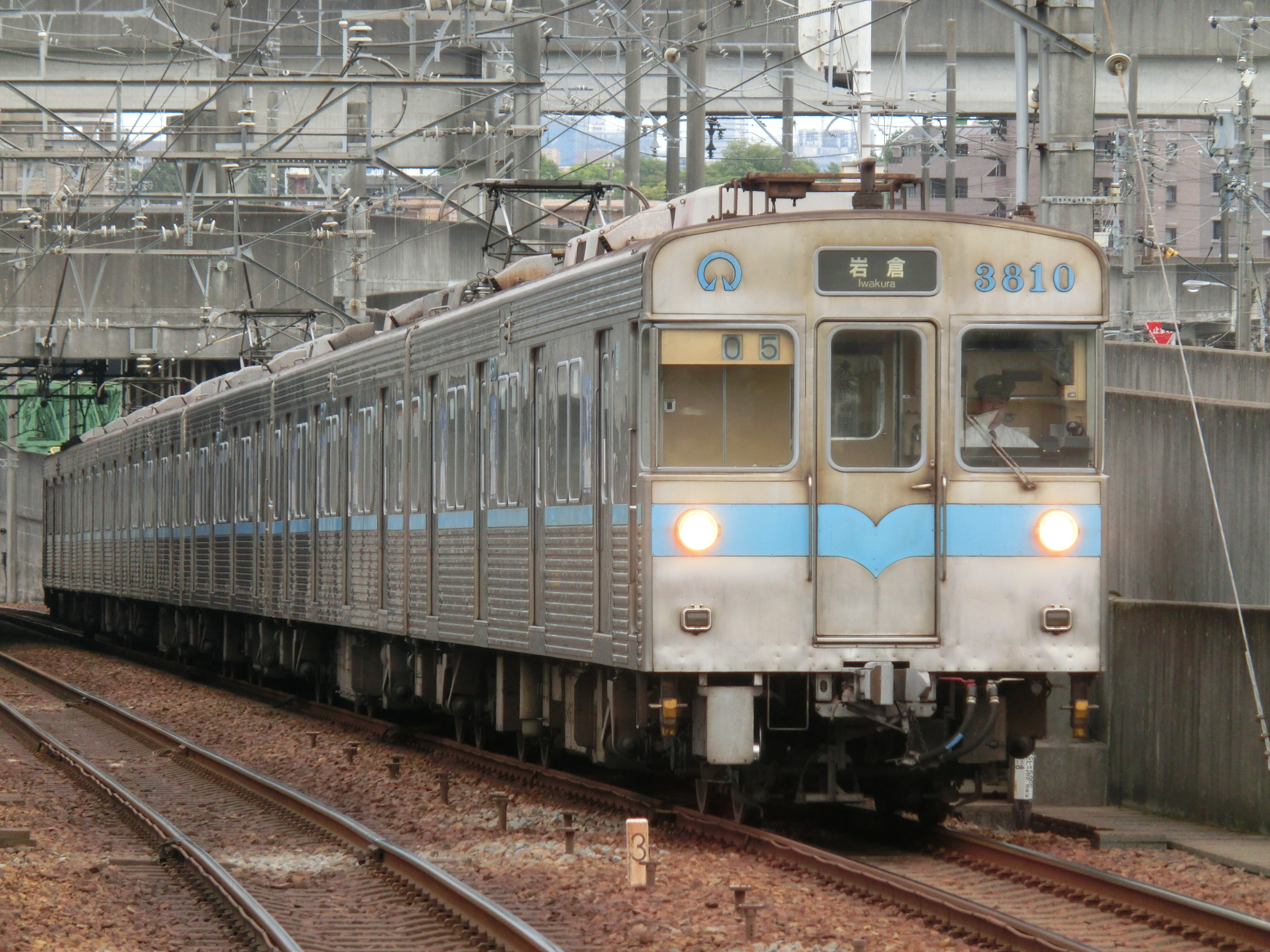
- A Nagoya Municipal Subway 3000 series set bound For Iwakura in May 2017
- In service: 1977 – February 2023
- Manufacturers: Hitachi, Nippon Sharyo
- Constructed: 1977-1984
- Entered service: 1977
- Number built: 92 vehicles (23 sets)
- Number in service: None
- Formation: 6 cars per trainset (originally 4 cars)
- Capacity: 810
- Operator: Transportation Bureau City of Nagoya
- Lines served: Tsurumai Line, Meitetsu Inuyama Line, Meitetsu Toyota Line, Meitetsu Mikawa Line

Specifications
- Car body construction: Steel/stainless steel
- Car length: 20 m (65 ft 7 in)
- Width: 2,746 mm (9 ft 0.1 in)
- Height: 4,128 mm (13 ft 6.5 in)
- Floor height: 1,138 mm (44.8 in)
- Doors: 4 pairs per side
- Maximum speed: 100 km/h (62 mph)
- Traction system: Mitsubishi/Hitachi Automatic Variable Field Thyristor Chopper control
- Acceleration: 3.0 km/(h⋅s) (1.9 mph/s)
- Electric system: 1,500 V DC
- Current collection: Overhead line
- Braking system: Brake-by-wire regenerative brakes
- Safety systems: ATC and Meitetsu ATS
- Track gauge: 1,067 mm (3 ft 6 in)

The Nagoya Municipal Subway 3000 series (名古屋市交通局3000形) was a rapid transit electric multiple unit operated by the Transportation Bureau City of Nagoya on the Nagoya Subway Tsurumai Line in Japan between 1977 and 2023. They have been replaced by the N3000 series.

== Formation ==
Originally delivered as 4-car sets, the trainsets were reformed into 6-car sets from 1993 as shown below with former cab cars inserted within the formations. Two surplus 3000 series cars were inserted into a later 3050 series set.

Designation	Mc1	M2	M1	M2	M1	Mc2
Numbering	3100	3200	3100	3200	3700	3800
Weight (t)	39.1	36.4	39.1	36.4	37.9	38.0
Capacity Total/seated	130/48	140/54	130/48	140/54		130/48

Designation	Mc1	M2	M1	M2	M1	Mc2
Numbering	3100	3200	3700	3800	3700	3800
Weight (t)	39.1	36.4	37.9	38.0	37.9	38.0
Capacity Total/seated	130/48	140/54		130/48	140/54	130/48

=== Original 4-car sets (1977–1993) ===
Designation	Mc1	M2	M1	Mc2
Numbering	3100	3200	3700	3800

== See also ==
- 3050 series (since 1993)
- N3000 series (since 16 March 2012)
