= Nagoya Municipal Subway 3050 series =

Japanese train type

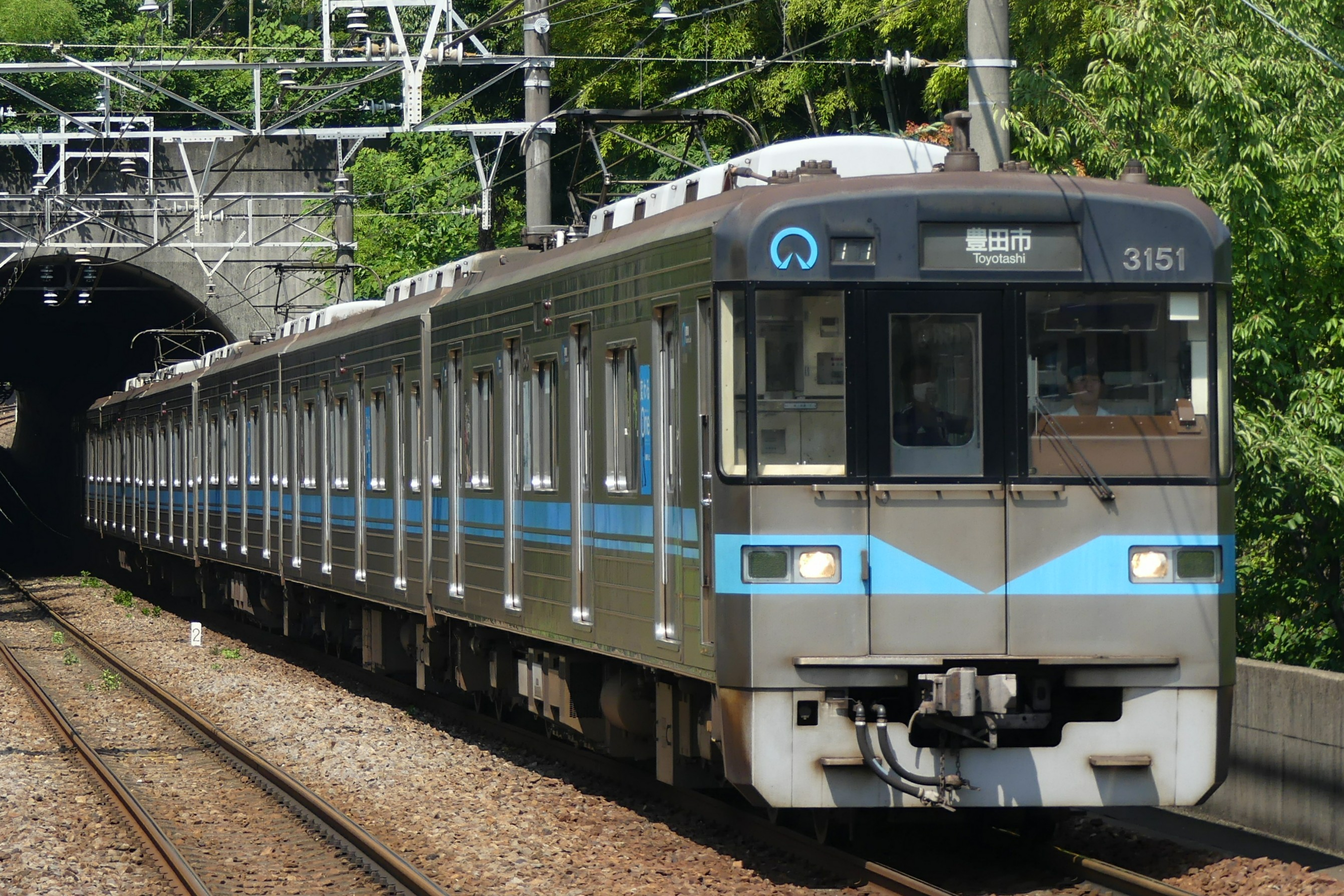
- Nagoya Municipal Subway 3050 series, July 2019
- In service: 1993–Present
- Manufacturer: Nippon Sharyo
- Number built: 58 cars (10 sets)
- Number in service: 58 cars (10 sets)
- Formation: 6 cars per trainset
- Capacity: 884
- Operators: Transportation Bureau City of Nagoya
- Lines served: Tsurumai Line, Meitetsu Inuyama Line, Meitetsu Toyota Line, Meitetsu Mikawa Line

Specifications
- Car body construction: Stainless steel
- Car length: 20,000 mm (65 ft 7 in)
- Width: 2,746 mm (9 ft 0.1 in)
- Height: 4,090 mm (13 ft 5 in)
- Floor height: 1,100 mm (43 in)
- Doors: 4 pairs per side
- Maximum speed: 100 km/h (62 mph)
- Traction system: Variable frequency (GTO)
- Acceleration: 3.0 km/(h⋅s) (1.9 mph/s)
- Electric system(s): 1,500 V DC
- Current collector(s): Overhead line
- Braking system(s): Brake-by-wire regenerative brakes
- Safety system(s): ATC and Meitetsu ATS
- Track gauge: 1,067 mm (3 ft 6 in)

The Nagoya Municipal Subway 3050 series (名古屋市交通局3050形) is a rapid transit electric multiple unit (EMU) operated by the Transportation Bureau City of Nagoya on the Nagoya Subway Tsurumai Line in Japan since 1993.

== Design ==
Like other modern cars on the Nagoya Subway lines, the 3050 series uses a variable-frequency drive controller to convert DC current to AC current to power a squirrel cage motor.

== Formation ==
The trainsets are formed as follows.

(Left is toward Toyotashi Station and Akaike Station and right is toward Kamiotai Station and Inuyama Station)

Car No.	1	2	3	4	5	6
Designation	Mc1	T1	M'	T2	M	Tc
Numbering	3150	3250	3350	3450	3750	3850
Weight (t)	36.0	28.0	34.0	25.0	35.0	30.0
Capacity Total/seated	138/46	152/54				130/46

One set was formed by using two surplus 3000 series cars.

Car No.	1	2	3	4	5	6
Designation	Mc1	T1	M1	M2	M	Tc
Numbering	3159	3259	3706	3806	3759	3859

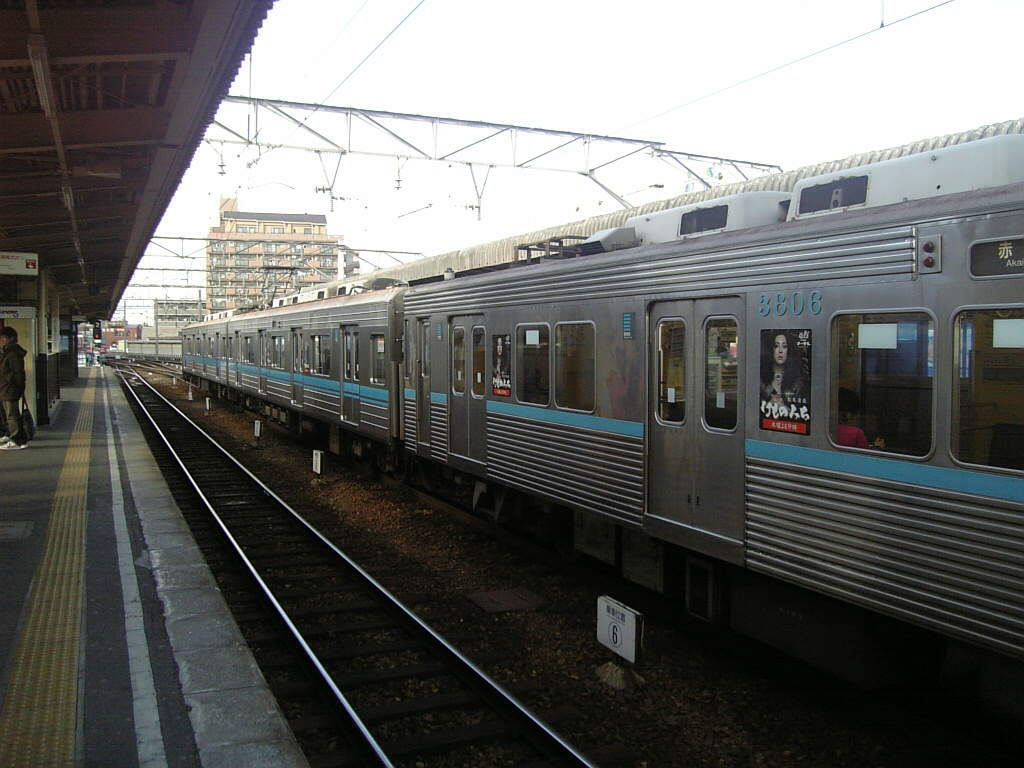
Former 3000 series car 3806 included in a 3050 series set, February 2006
