= Naitō =

Naitō, Naito or Naitou (written: 内藤, lit. "within wisteria(s)) is a Japanese surname, also transliterated as Naitoh or Nightow. Notable people with the surname include:

- Arimasa Naitoh (内藤 在正), vice president of Lenovo's PC and Smart Devices business unit, known as the "Father of ThinkPad"
- Bill Naito (内藤 住郎; 1925–1996), American businessman, civic leader and philanthropist
- Daisuke Naito (内藤 大助; born 1974), Japanese professional boxer
- Kanako Naito (内藤 香菜子; 1980–2019), Japanese female volleyball player
- Kunio Naitō (内藤 國雄; born 1939), Japanese professional shogi player
- Naitō Genzaemon (内藤 源左衛門), Japanese samurai
- Naitō Ienaga (内藤 家長; 1546–1600), Japanese samurai
- Naitō Joan (内藤 如安; died 1626), Japanese samurai
- Naitō Kiyokazu (内藤 清枚; 1645–1714), Japanese daimyo
- Naitō Kiyonaga (内藤 清長; 1501–1564), Japanese samurai
- Masato Naito (内藤 真人; born 1980), Japanese hurler
- Masatoshi Naitō (内藤 正敏; born 1938), Japanese photographer
- Naitō Nobuatsu (内藤 信敦; 1777–1825), Japanese daimyo
- Naitō Nobuchika (内藤 信親; 1813–1874), Japanese daimyo
- Naitō Nobunari (内藤 信成; 1545–1612), Japanese samurai
- Ryō Naitō (内藤 玲; born 1974), Japanese voice actor
- Tachū Naitō (内藤 多仲; 1886–1970), Japanese architect, engineer, and professor
- Tadayuki Naitoh (内藤 忠行; born 1941), Japanese photographer
- Tetsuya Naito (内藤 哲也; born 1982), Japanese professional wrestler
- Tomofumi Naito (内藤智文; born 1993), Japanese ski jumper
- Naitō Torajirō (内藤 虎次郎; 1866–1934), Japanese historian
- Naitō Toyomasa (内藤 豊昌; 1773–1856), Japanese sculptor
- Yasuhiro Nightow (内藤 泰弘; born 1967), Japanese manga artist
- Yasuo Naito (内藤 靖雄; born 1942), Japanese racewalker
- Yohei Naito (内藤 洋平; born 1988), Japanese footballer
- Yuki Naito (内藤 祐希; born 2001), Japanese tennis player
