= Iwasaki Castle (Owari Province) =

- 岩崎城
- Nisshin, Aichi Prefecture, Japan
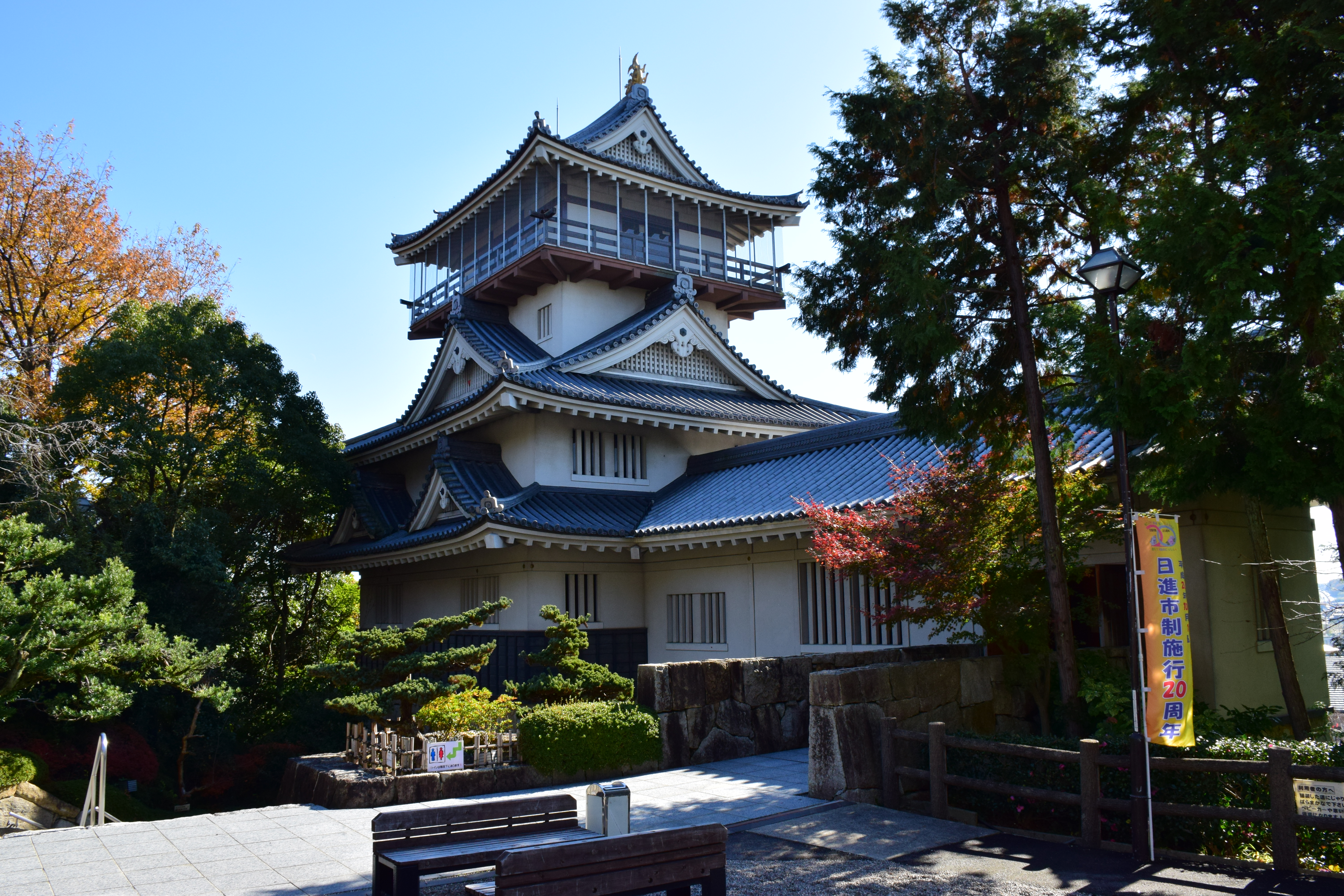
- Reconstructed donjon of Iwasaki Castle

Site information
- Type: hirayama-style Japanese castle
- Open to the public: yes

Location
- Coordinates: 35°08′44″N 137°02′31″E

Site history
- Built: Sengoku period
- In use: Sengoku period
- Demolished: c.1600

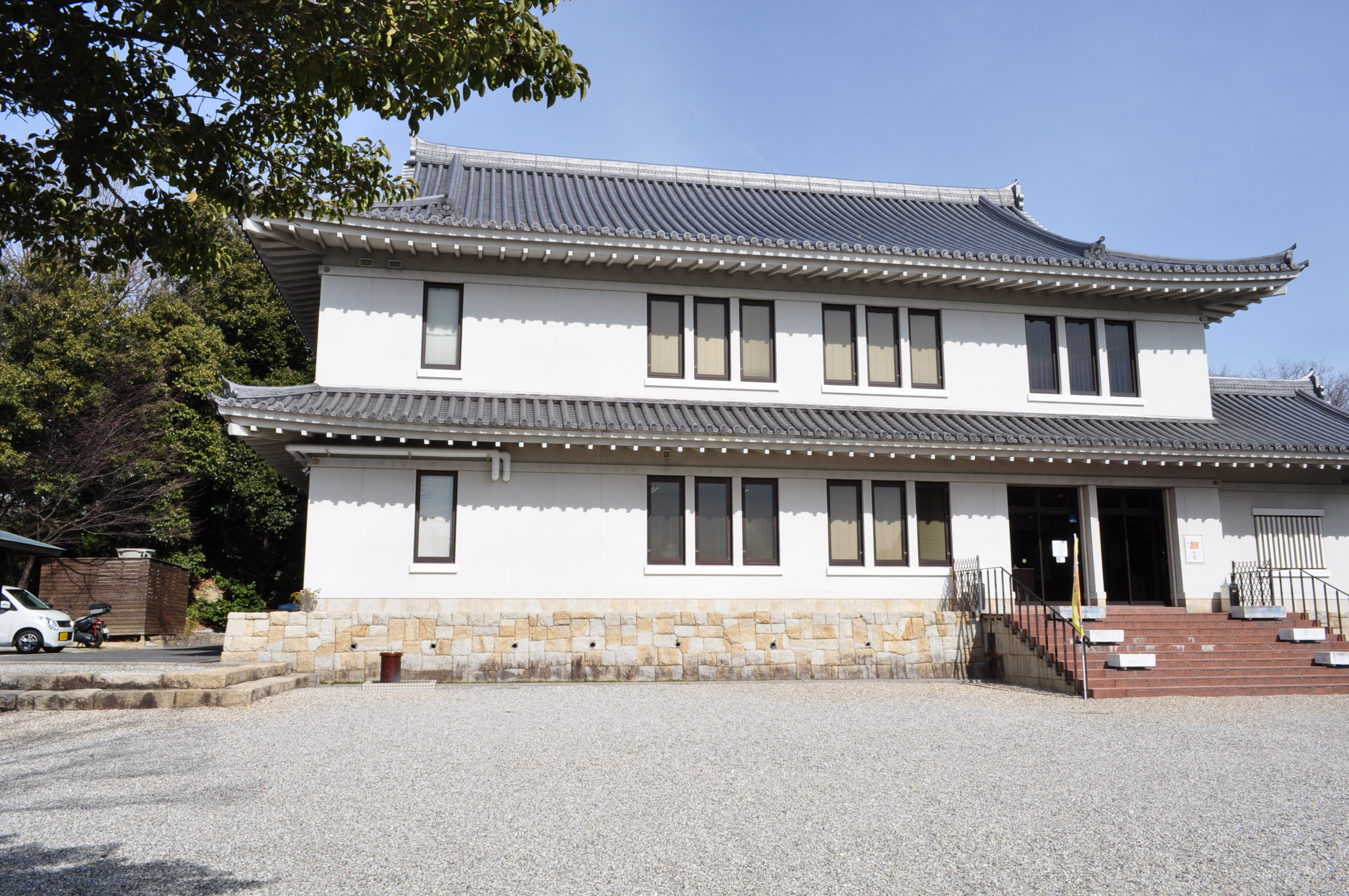
Castle museum building

Iwasaki Castle (岩崎城, Iwasaki-jō) is a hill castle (平山城 hirayamajiro) located in the city of Nisshin, Aichi Prefecture, Japan. It was built during the Sengoku period in Owari Province and was a support castle to Shobata Castle (勝幡城 Shobata-jō).

== History ==
The origins of Iwasaki Castle are uncertain. It was built sometime in the early 16th century by Oda Nobuhide, the father of Oda Nobunaga in an attempt to protect his eastern borders against the aggressive Imagawa clan and is located at a strategic point on the highway connecting Mikawa Province with Owari Province.

The castle changed hands in 1529, when Matsudaira Kiyoyasu (the grandfather of Tokugawa Ieyasu) seized it and made it the headquarters for the Matsudaira clan. Kiyoyasu's son, Matsudaira Hirotada, moved his residence elsewhere after Kiyoyasu was assassinated in 1535 by one of his retainers, Abe Masatoyo. One of his retainers, Niwa Ujikiyo, was placed in control of the castle and his descendants continued to rule the area until Battle of Iwasaki Castle in 1584. The Battle of Iwasaki was part of the larger Battle of Komaki and Nagakute, and during the battle the castle was besieged and taken by the forces of Toyotomi Hideyoshi, led by Ikeda Tsuneoki. The garrison, led by Niwa Ujitsugu, suffered numerous casualties including 300 killed, Ujitsugu's brother Niwa Ujishige being among the dead. The castle was abandoned and destroyed after the Battle of Sekigahara in 1600.

After the victory of Tokugawa Ieyasu at the Battle of Sekigahara in 1600, the castle was abandoned. The Niwa clan received new domains in what is now the city of Toyota.

== Today ==
The castle is now located in a two-hectare park. Parts of the castle lie in ruins, including the remains of a well and a turret (yagura) which were discovered during archeological excavations. The donjon, or tenshu, was reconstructed in 1987 out of ferro-concrete and holds a museum local history museum with ceramics, samurai armor and documents on the history of the castle.
