= Kiyonaga (disambiguation) =

Kiyonaga (Torii Kiyonaga, 1752–1815) was a Japanese ukiyo-e artist of the Torii school.

Kiyonaga may also refer to:

== People ==
- Kōriki Kiyonaga (1530–1608), Japanese daimyō during the Azuchi–Momoyama and Edo periods
- Naitō Kiyonaga (1501–1564), Japanese samurai of the Sengoku period
- Takeru Kiyonaga (born 1994), Japanese football player

== Fictional characters ==
- Kristopher McLaughlin, known in Japan as Kiyonaga Matsumoto, a Case Closed character
