= Rachel and Jun =

YouTube channel

- Born: Junichi Yoshizuki (Jun); Nagoya, Aichi, Japan; Rachel; Cincinnati, Ohio, U.S.
- Occupation: YouTubers

YouTube information
- Channels: Rachel and Jun; Rachel & Jun's Adventures!; JunsKitchen
- Years active: 2012–present
- Genres: Documentary; interview; vlog
- Subscribers: 9.0 million (combined)
- Views: 935.0 million (combined)
- Last updated: September 22, 2025

Rachel and Jun are an American/Japanese married couple of YouTube personalities who make online videos about Japanese culture and society from a Western perspective, and reciprocal perceptions between Japanese and Westerners.

== YouTube channel ==
The videos on the Rachel and Jun and Rachel & Jun's Adventures! channels consist of vlogs on various topics related to Japanese culture and society, personal experiences and daily life, and also interactions with other Japan-related vloggers. The initial name of the Rachel and Jun channel, "MyHusbandisJapanese", was created by Jun as a reference to Japanese pop culture, inspired by the title of the manga series My Darling Is a Foreigner. The breakthrough was the video "What NOT to do in Japan", in March 2012, which quickly amassed hundreds of thousands of views (at the moment of its launch they had about a dozen subscribers). The channel proved to be popular and became an increasing priority in their lives. A video of a visit to the "Fox Village" (Kitsune Mura) from Zaō (July 2015) went viral and was featured on many websites.

Some of the videos are documentaries with interviews on specific topics. The 80-minute documentary "Black in Japan", interviewing black people living in Japan, was featured in the BBC article "What's it like to be black in Japan?" and in other news media websites. Other videos synthesize information about Japanese society that is not readily available in English, as in the case of the video about the women's reaction on Twitter to the news that the Tokyo Medical University rigged test scores to admit fewer female candidates.

In 2016, they traveled from the northern to southern tip of Japan for the travel website Odigo (now Tokyo Creative Travel), visiting a total of 20 prefectures and producing a series of travel videos. They were also scheduled panel guests at the anime convention Animazement in Raleigh, North Carolina (May 27–29, 2016).

The couple were featured in BBC, The Japan Times, Japan Today and in the TV show Asachan from TBS, in a section dedicated to foreign YouTube personalities based in Japan.

Rachel and Jun have collaborations with other notable YouTubers such as Simon and Martina, Sebastiano Serafini, The Anime Man, einshine, and Miranda Ibañez.

Jun has an associated channel, Jun's Kitchen, where he posts videos about cooking and culinary arts (the appeal of the videos is increased by his interactions with his cats Haku, Nagi, Poki, and Pichi). He also has an additional personal vlog channel, titled Jun Yoshizuki, which hosts more informal cooking, DIY, and gardening videos.

== Personal life ==
Rachel is from Cincinnati, Ohio. Rachel (b. 1988) and Junichi "Jun" Yoshizuki (b. 1989) (葦月淳一, Yoshizuki Jun'ichi) met at Nagoya University of Foreign Studies in 2010. They married in 2011 but spent four years in a long-distance relationship while Jun finished his studies in Japan and Rachel served out an obligation as an officer in the United States Air Force.

Rachel and Jun live in Fukuoka with their four cats, Kohaku, Poki, Nagi and Pichi. In July 2026, Rachel and Jun announced the birth of their first child, a boy.
