= Nobunari =

Nobunari is a masculine Japanese given name. Notable people with the name include:

- Naitō Nobunari, samurai
- Nobunari Oda, figure skater
