= Matsudaira Kiyoyasu =

Lord of the Matsudaira clan

- 松平 清康
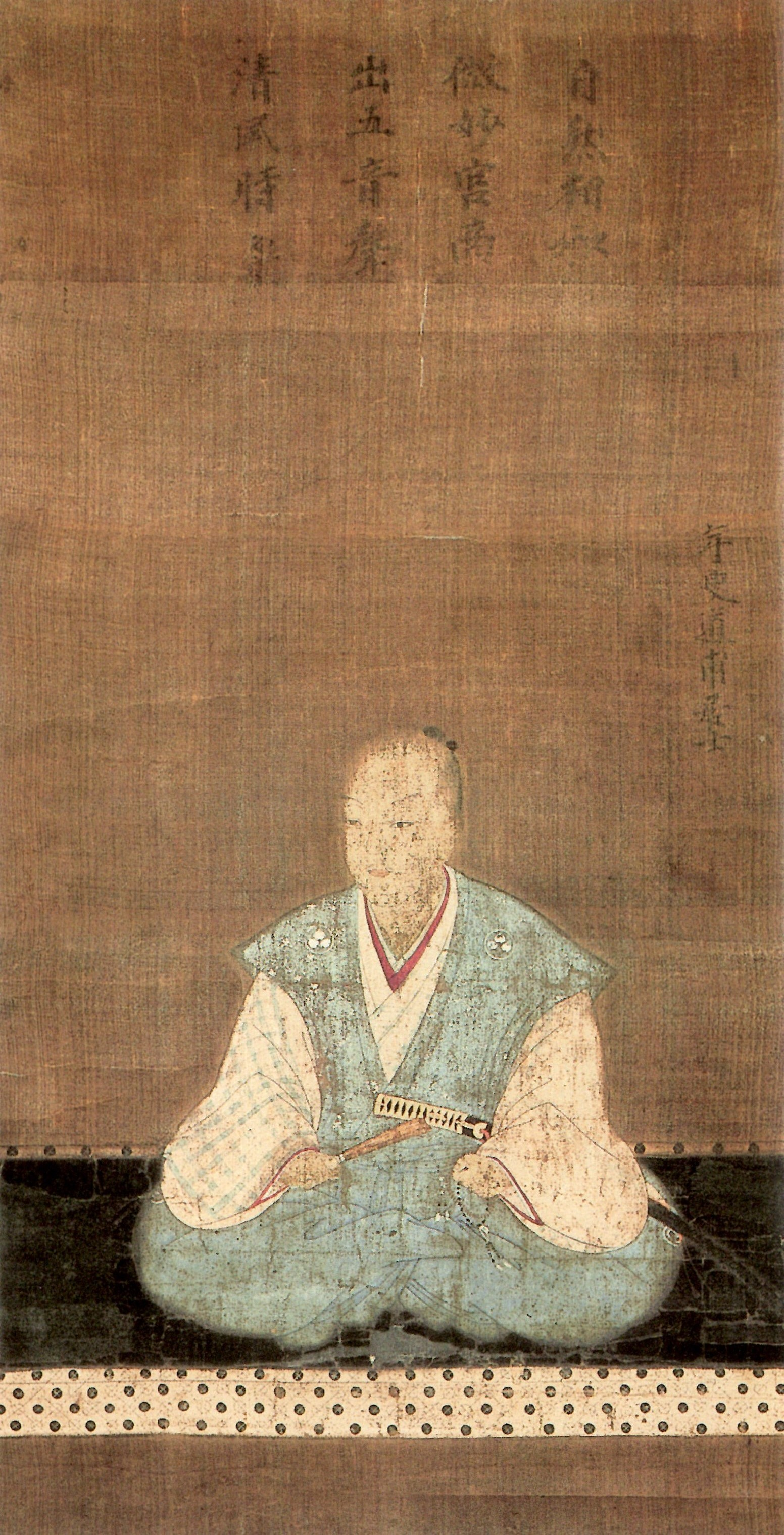

Head of Matsudaira clan
- In office 1531–1535
- Preceded by: Matsudaira Nobutada
- Succeeded by: Matsudaira Hirotada

Personal details
- Born: 28 September 1511
- Died: 29 November 1535 (aged 24)
- Spouse: Haruhime
- Children: Matsudaira Hirotada
- Parents: Matsudaira Nobutada (father); Mizuno (mother)
- Relatives: Tokugawa Ieyasu (grandson)

Military service
- Allegiance: Imagawa clan
- Unit: Matsudaira clan
- Battles/wars: Mikawa Campaign

Matsudaira Kiyoyasu (松平 清康; 28 September 1511 – 29 November 1535) was the 7th lord over the Matsudaira clan during the Sengoku period (16th century) of Japan. Kiyoyasu was the paternal grandfather of the third "great unifier of Japan", Tokugawa Ieyasu.

== Biography ==
Kiyoyasu gained control of the whole of northern Mikawa Province after the Saigo clan surrendered following four generations of conflict. Okazaki Castle was also built as a monument to the Matsudaira's power.

Following this conquest, one of Kiyoyasu's retainers, Abe Masatoyo, began to resent Kiyoyasu. In 1535, Kiyoyasu allied with Saitō Dōsan and attacked Moriyama Castle, which was defended by Oda Nobumitsu, the younger brother of Oda Nobuhide. However, during this battle, Abe somehow entered Kiyoyasu's secret chambers and slew him with his Muramasa blade.

Another version of Matsudaira Kiyoyasu's death has been told by the author A. L. Sadler:

"Kiyoyasu, the son of Nobutada, was a fine soldier, and his friendship was solicited both by Takeda Nobutora, father of the great Shingen, and also by Oda Nobukatsu, son of the more famous Nobunaga. Oda later made secret overtures to the effect that if Kiyoyasu attacked his province he would be on his side, his intention being to oust his elder brother Nobuhide, the head of the clan. So Kiyoyasu set out against this province. But his wicked uncle Nobusada, seeing an opportunity, sent to Nobuhide to say that he was about to take the Castle of Anjo, the headquarters of Kiyoyasu, from which he had set out. When Kiyoyasu heard of this he was naturally very troubled at the possibility of his base being taken behind his back, and he was rendered more so by another rumour started by someone that his most faithful retainer Abe Sadayoshi was also in league with his uncle. Abe Sadayoshi was very indignant when he heard this slander, and called his son Yashichi, telling him that it was false, and would be proved so if proper examination was made. But if this was not done, and he was put to death on suspicion, he impressed on him the need of his continuing to serve their lord faithfully as if nothing had happened. Just after this Sadayoshi's horse began to be restless and kick out, and there was some confusion, and Kiyoyasu came out and gave orders to catch it and tie it up. Hearing the noise, Yashichi at once concluded that his father was being arrested and was in danger, and without more Ado rushed out on the spur of the moment without any reflection and cut Kiyoyasu down. He was at once killed himself, but that did not save Kiyoyasu, who was only twenty-five. But he was not without an heir, his son Hirotada being ten years old. The army of Kiyoyasu had to retire immediately he was killed, and it was Sadayoshi who took charge of his son, for the charge of treason seems to have been quickly shown to be false, and he was trusted as before."

After Kiyoyasu's death, the Battle of Idano was fought, and peace returned to the Matsudaira domain. Matsudaira Hirotada, father of Ieyasu, succeeded to the position of power within the Matsudaira clan.

== Ancestry ==
Ancestors of Matsudaira Kiyoyasu

16. Matsudaira Nobumitsu (c. 1404- c. 1488)
8. Matsudaira Chikatada (c. 1431-1501)
17. Shinjōin (d. 1461)
4. Matsudaira Nagachika (1473-1519)
18. Suzuki Shigekatsu
9. Senshuin (Suzuki)
2. Matsudaira Nobutada (1490-1531)
10. Matsudaira Nagasawa (?)
5. Gekkū Jōun (d. 1527)
1. Matsudaira Kiyoyasu
3. Mizuno

== Family ==
=== Parent ===
Status	Name	posthumous Name	Birth	Death	Parents
Father	Matsudaira Nobutada	Ansei-in	1490	September 8, 1531	Matsudaira Nagachika (1471-1544), Gekkū Jōun (d. 1527)
Mother					Okochi Mitsunari

=== Siblings ===
Name	posthumous Name	Birth	Death	Spouse	Children
Matsudaira Nobutaka of Mitsugi-Matsudaira Family			May 22, 1548		Matsudaira Shigetada
Matsudaira Yasutaka of Udono-Matsudaira Family	Bashoin		April 3, 1542		Matsudaira Yasusada
Hisahime				Suzuki Shigenao	
Higashihime				Ohama Michijo	
Yahagi-dono				Married into Shimada clan	
Seto-no-Ofusa				Kira Tokihiro (d.1539)	Nishio Yoshitsugu (1530-1606) of Haraichi Domain

=== Wives ===
Status	Image	Name	posthumous Name	Birth	Death	Parents	issue
First Wife		Haruhime				Matsudaira Masayasu (d.1525) of Ōkusa-Matsudaira clan	Matsudaira Hirotada
Second Wife		Otomi-no-Kata	Kayouin	1492	May 30, 1560	speculated as Okochi Mitsunari’s daughter/Okochi Mototsuna’s daughter/Aoki Ichimune’s daughter	Matsudaira Nobuyasu, Usuihime

=== Children ===
Name	Posthumous Name	Birth	Death	Mother	Marriage	Issue
Matsudaira Hirotada	Ouseidokandaikoji	June 9, 1526	April 3, 1549	Haruhime	First: Odai-no-Kata (1582-1602), Mizuno Tadamasa’s daughter Second: Makihime, Toda Yasumitsu’s daughter	By first: Matsudaira Motonobu, Takohime; By Second: Ichibahime (d.1593) married Arakawa Yoshihiro later married Tsutsui Sadatsugu of Iga-Ueno Domain; By Concubines: Matsudaira Tadamasa (1544-1591), Priest Esai, Yadahime married Matsudaira Yasutada (1546-1618) of Nagasawa-Matsudaira clan, Matsudaira Iemoto, Naito Nobunari of Nagahama Domain, Matsudaira Chikayoshi
	Koju’in	1529	1605		Kira Yoshiyasu (1536-1569)	Kira Yoshisada (1564-1627
Matsudaira Nobuyasu			1540	Otomi-no-Kata		
Usuihime	Koki-in	1529	1605	Otomi-no-Kata	First: Matsudaira Masatada (d.1560) of Nagasawa-Matsudaira clan Second: Sakai Tadatsugu	By First: Matsudaira Yasutada (1546-1618) of Nagasawa-Matsudaira clan By Second: Sakai Ietsugu (1564–1619) of Takada Domain; Honda Yasutoshi of Zeze Domain
