= Nagoya City Tram & Subway Museum =

- レトロでんしゃ館
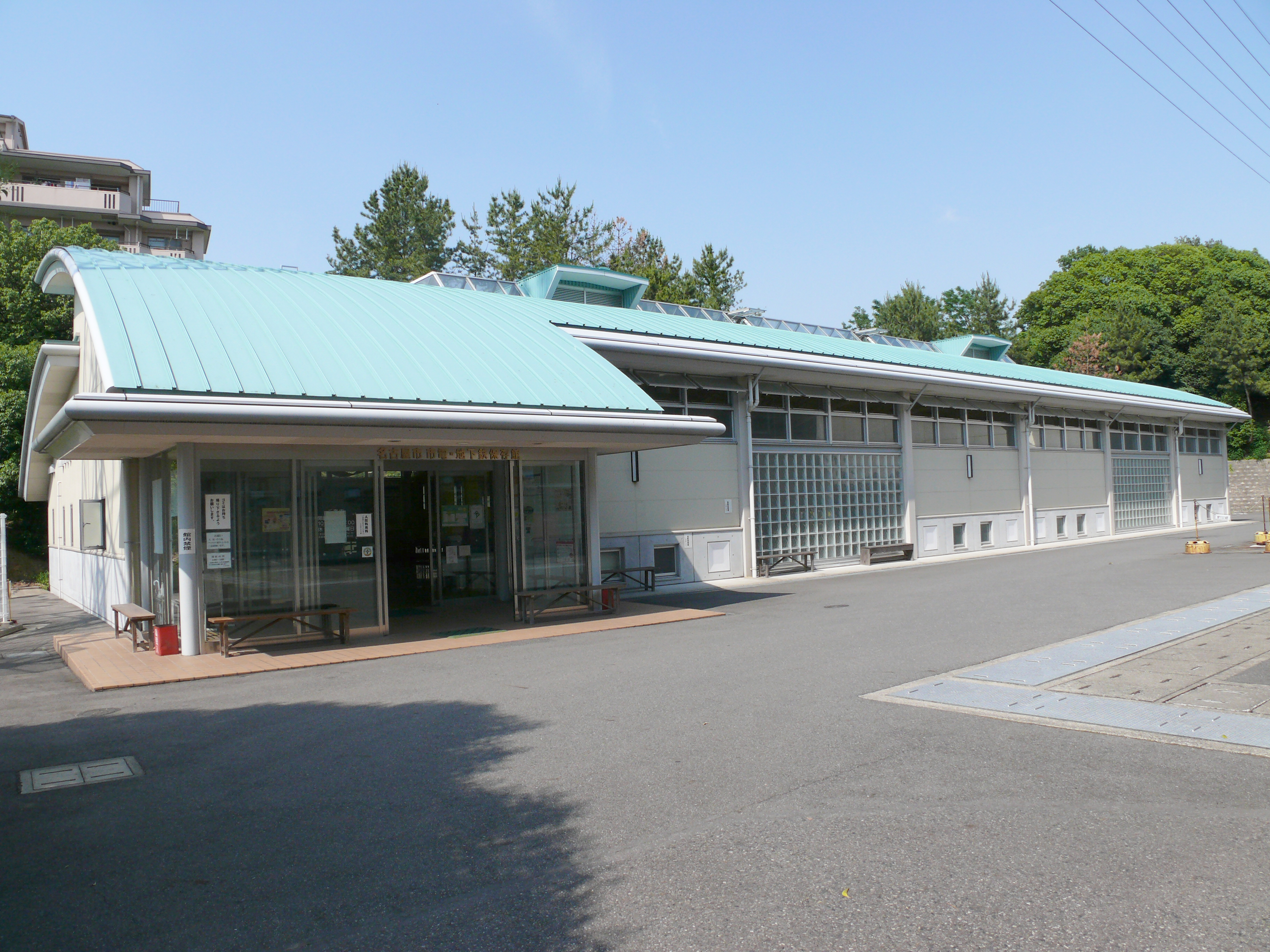
- Nagoya City Tram & Subway Museum

- Location within Aichi Prefecture Location within Japan
- Established: 2 June 2000
- Location: Nisshin, Aichi, Japan
- Coordinates: 35°07′22.37″N 137°01′18.65″E
- Type: Transportation Museum
- Owner: Transportation Bureau City of Nagoya

The Nagoya City Tram & Subway Museum (レトロでんしゃ館, 'Retoro densha-kan) is a museum located in the city of Nisshin, Aichi, Japan. It is owned and operated by the Transportation Bureau of the City of Nagoya.

The museum houses a collection of Nagoya's old subway trains and trams. The museum visitors can experience driving Nagoya's present-day subway trains and older models of streetcars using PlayStation-style computer simulator. Model train displays and staff uniforms and caps complement the exhibit. Outside the museum is a giant tunneling shield excavator, which was used to dig Nagoya's subway tunnels.

Access by public transport is Akaike Station on the Tsurumai Line.
