= Matsudaira Iemoto =

Japanese samurai (1548–1603)

Matsudaira Iemoto (松平 家元) (1548 – September 19, 1603) was a Japanese samurai of the Sengoku through early Edo period. He is believed to have been the illegitimate son of Matsudaira Hirotada of Okazaki, and therefore the half-brother of Tokugawa Ieyasu. He was also known as Matsudaira Saburo Goro Iemoto.

== Family ==
- Father: Matsudaira Hirotada
- Half-siblings:
  - Tokugawa Ieyasu
  - Naito Nobunari
  - Matsudaira Tadamasa (1544-1591)
  - Shooko Eike
  - Matsudaira Chikayoshi
- Natural Siblings:
  - Ichibahime (d.1593) married Arakawa Yoshihiro
  - Yadahime married Matsudaira Yasutada
