= Nagoya University of Arts and Sciences =

Private university in Aichi, Japan

- 名古屋学芸大学
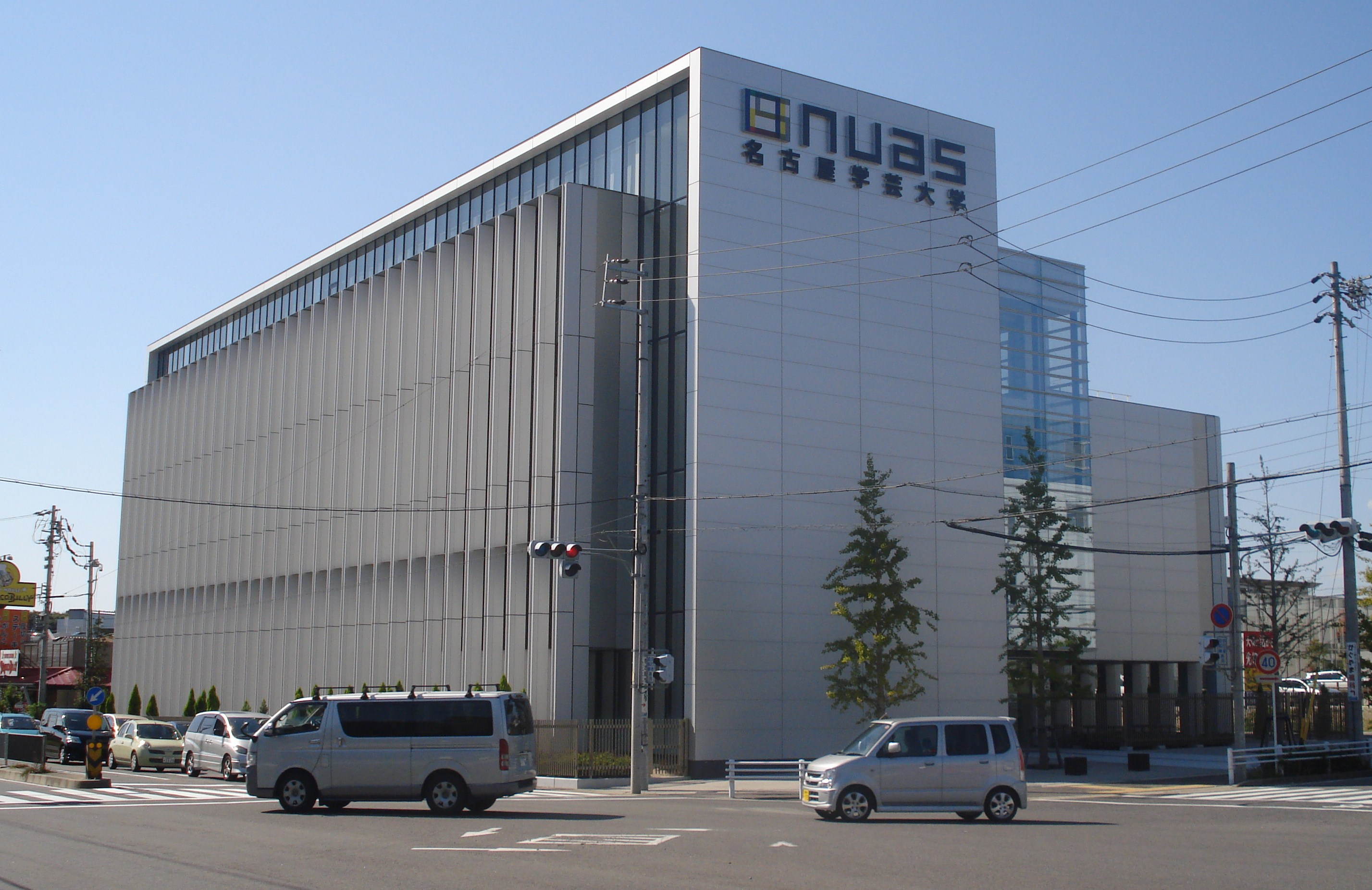
- Nagoya University of Arts and Sciences
- Type: Private
- Established: 1945
- Location: Nisshin, Aichi, Japan; 35.1573°N 137.0422°E
- Website: www.nuas.ac.jp/index.html (in Japanese)

Nagoya University of Arts and Sciences (名古屋学芸大学, Nagoya Gakugei Daigaku) is a private university at Nisshin, Aichi, Japan. The predecessor of the school was founded in 1945. It was chartered as a university in 2002.
