= Nisshin, Aichi =

Nisshin 日進市
- City
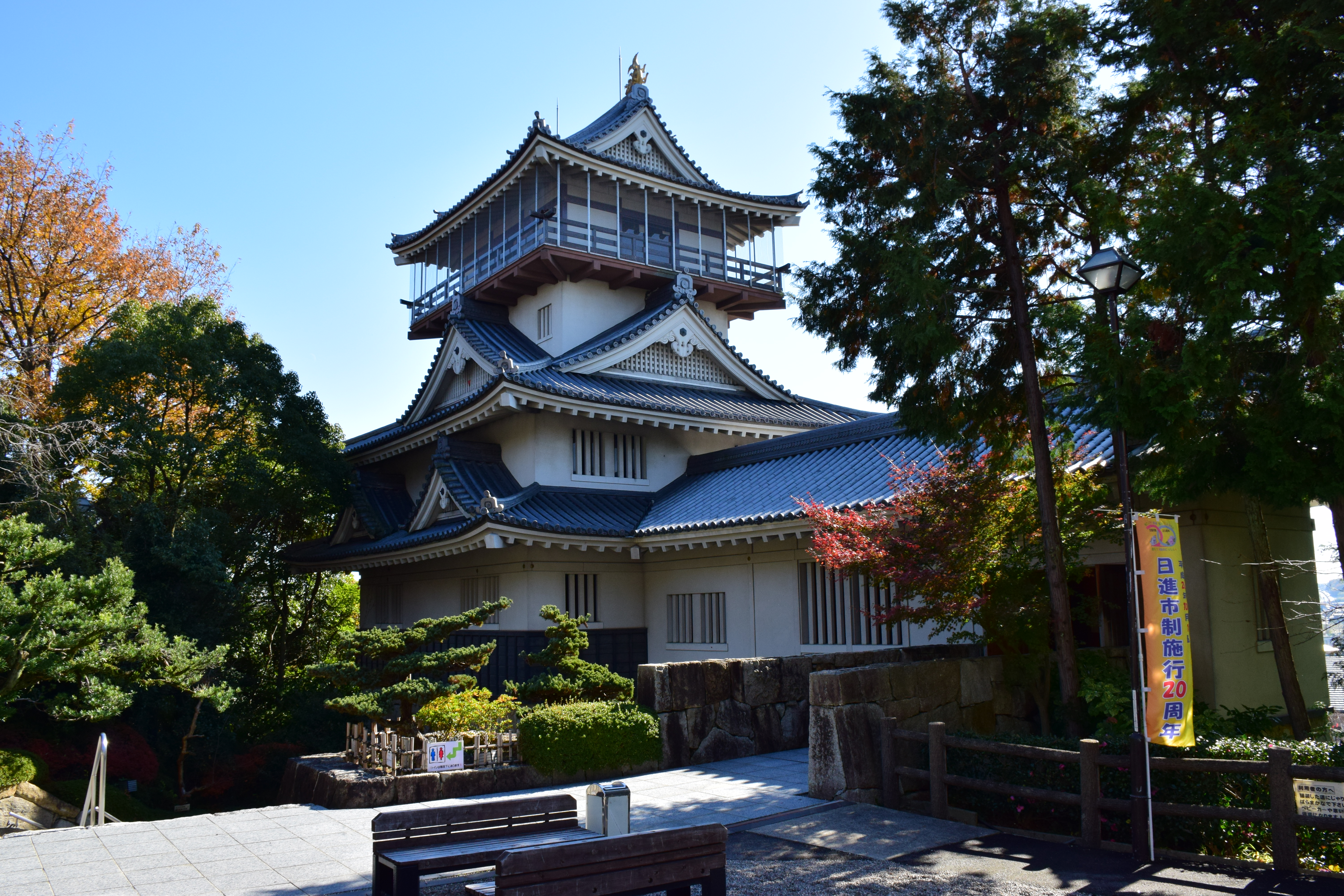
- Iwasaki Castle

- Flag Seal

- Location of Nisshin in Aichi Prefecture

- Coordinates: 35°07′55.1″N 137°02′22″E
- Country: Japan
- Region: Chūbu (Tōkai)
- Prefecture: Aichi

Government
  - Mayor: Kozo Hagino (since July 2007)

Area
  - Total: 34.91 km^{2} (13.48 sq mi)

Population (October 1, 2019)
  - Total: 91,795
  - Density: 2,629/km^{2} (6,810/sq mi)
- Time zone: UTC+9 (Japan Standard Time)
  - Tree: Osmanthus
  - Flower: Hydrangea
- Phone number: 0561-73-2111
- Address: 268 Kanikochō Ikeshita, Nisshin-shi, Aichi-ken 470-0192
- Website: Official website

Nisshin (日進市, Nisshin-shi) is a city in Aichi Prefecture, Japan. As of 1 October 2019, the city had an estimated population of 91,795 in 37,398 households, and a population density of 2,629 persons per km^{2}. The total area of the city was 34.91 square kilometres (13.48 sq mi).

== Geography ==
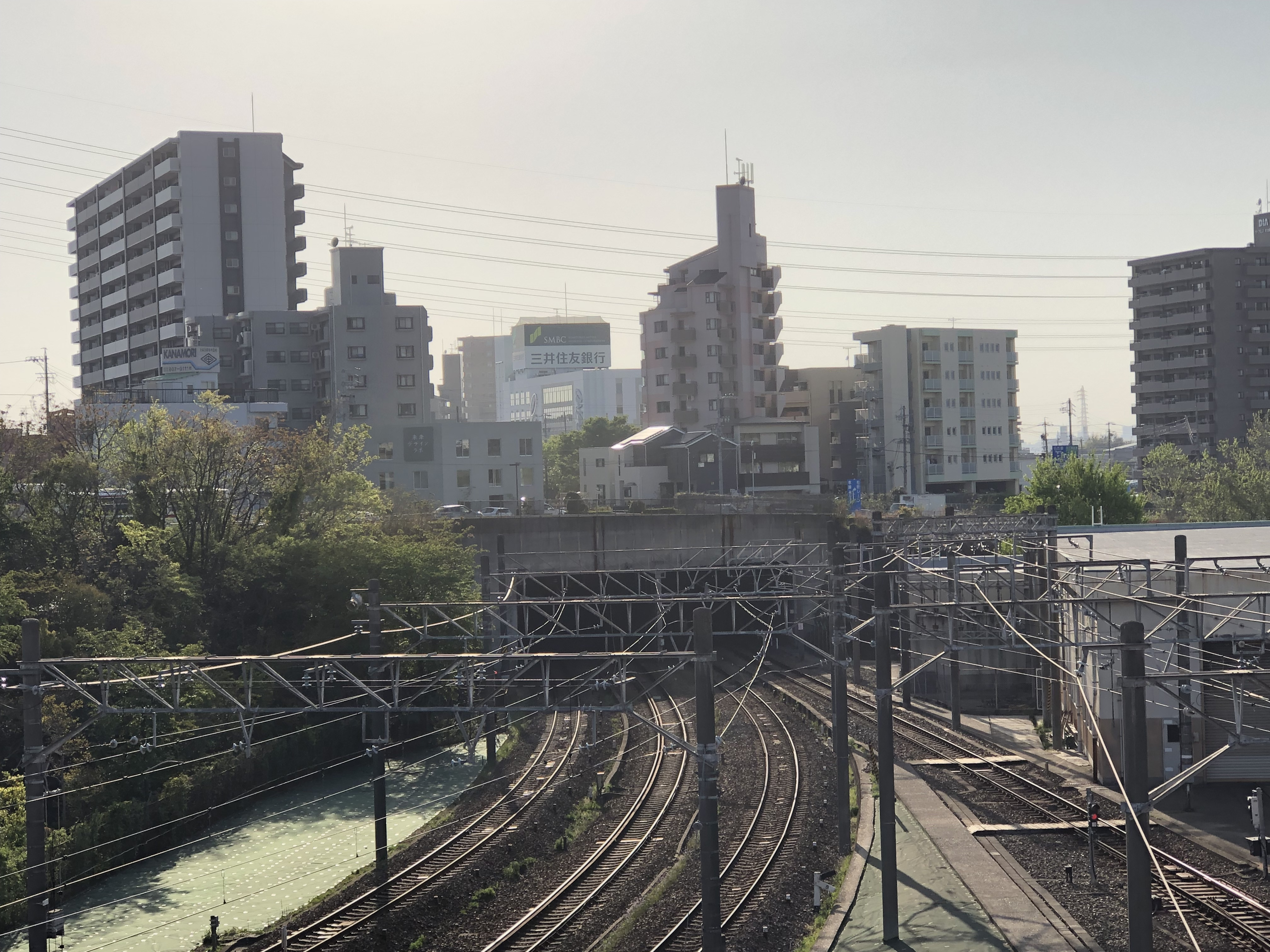
Skyline of Nisshin City（AkaikeTown）

Nisshin is located on the flatlands of central Aichi Prefecture, and is bordered by the metropolis of Nagoya to the west.

=== Climate ===
The city has a climate characterized by hot and humid summers and relatively mild winters (Köppen climate classification Cfa). The average annual temperature in Nisshin is 15.7 °C. The average annual rainfall is 1603 mm with September as the wettest month. The temperatures are highest on average in August, at around 28.0 °C, and lowest in January, at around 4.1 °C.

=== Demographics ===
Per Japanese census data, the population of Nisshin has grown rapidly over the past 50 years.

Historical population
Year	Pop.	±%
1940	8,055	—
1950	10,880	+35.1%
1960	11,187	+2.8%
1970	21,486	+92.1%
1980	41,024	+90.9%
1990	50,335	+22.7%
2000	70,188	+39.4%
2010	84,187	+19.9%

=== Neighboring municipalities ===
Aichi Prefecture

- Miyoshi
- Nagakute
- Nagoya (Midori-ku, Tenpaku-ku, Meitō-ku)
- Tōgō
- Toyota

== History ==
=== Late modern period ===
With the establishment of the modern municipalities system on October 1, 1889, the villages of Iwasaki, Shiroyama and Kaguyama were created within Aichi District of Aichi Prefecture. These three villages merged on May 10, 1906, to create the village of Nisshin. The village was named after the Imperial Japanese Navy cruiser Nisshin, which became famous during the Russo-Japanese War.

=== Contemporary history ===
Nisshin became a town on January 1, 1951, and was elevated to city status on October 1, 1994.

== Government ==
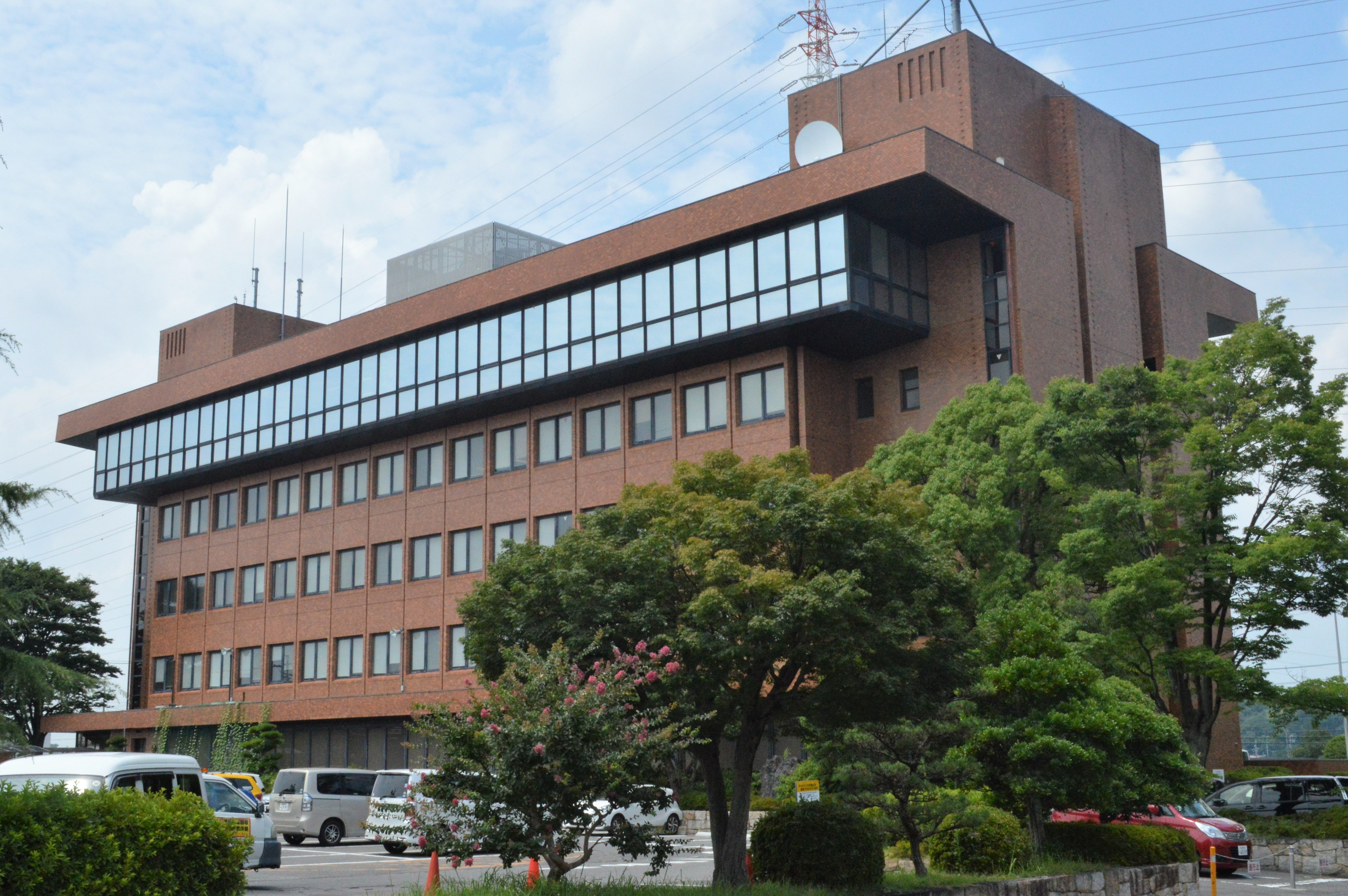
Nisshin city hall

Nisshin has a mayor-council form of government with a directly elected mayor and a unicameral city legislature of 20 members. The city contributes two members to the Aichi Prefectural Assembly. In terms of national politics, the city is part of Aichi District 7 of the lower house of the Diet of Japan.

== Sister cities ==
=== International ===
Sister city

- Owensboro, Kentucky, United States, since April 4, 2007

=== National ===
- Kiso, Nagano Prefecture, since April 12, 1992
- Shima, Mie Prefecture, since September 26, 2014

== Education ==
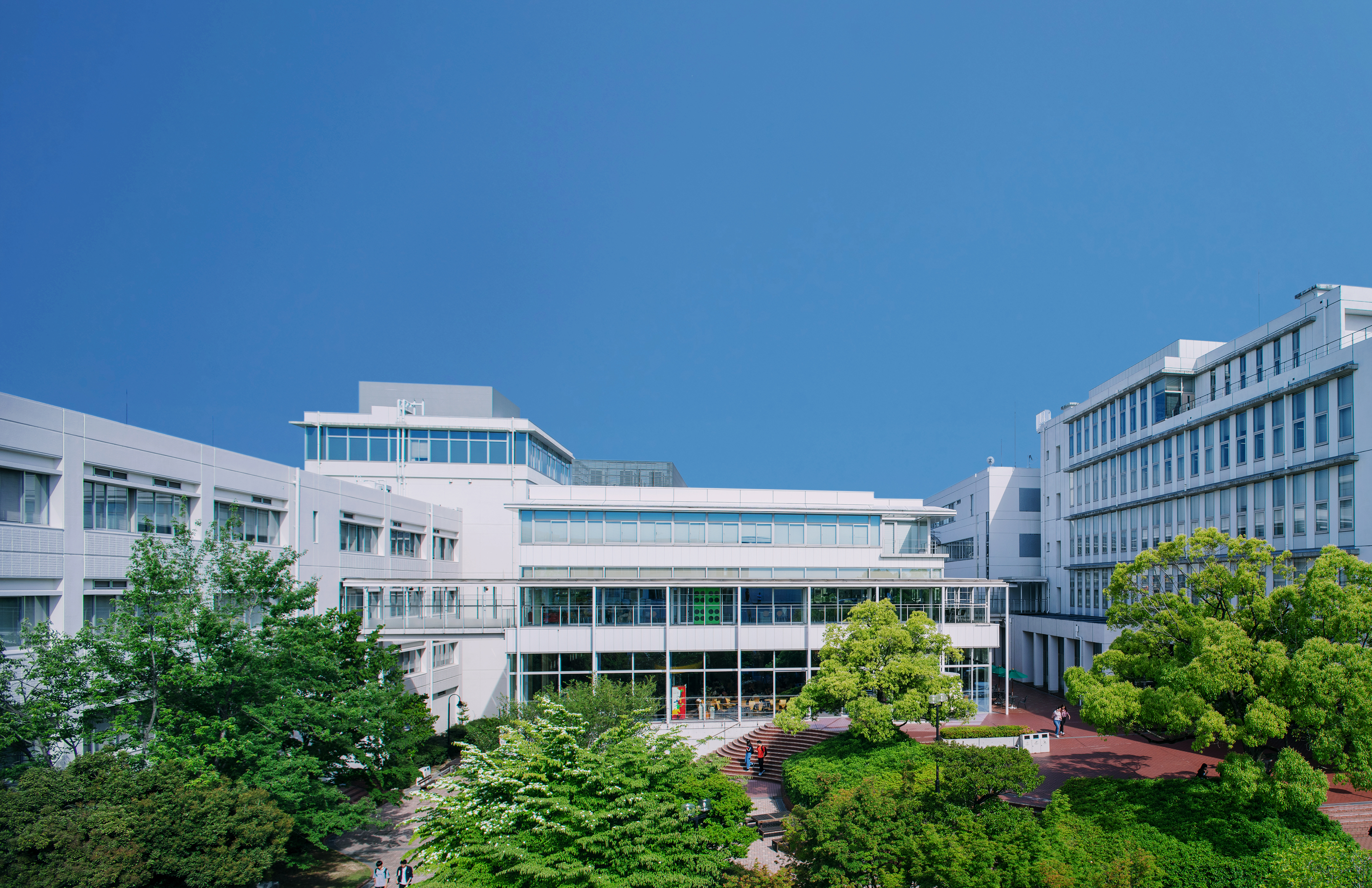
Nagoya University of Foreign Studies

=== University ===
- Aichi Gakuin University – Nisshin campus
- Aichi Toho University – Nisshin ground
- Meijo University – Nisshin campus (Nisshin ground)
- Nagoya University of Arts and Sciences
- Nagoya University of Commerce & Business
- Nagoya University of Foreign Studies
- Sugiyama Jogakuen University – Nisshin campus

=== Primary and secondary education ===
- Nisshin has nine public elementary schools and four public middle schools operated by the city government and two public high schools operated by the Aichi Prefectural Board of Education. There is also one private high school.

== Transportation ==
=== Railways ===
==== Conventional lines ====
Meitetsu

- Meitetsu Toyota Line: - Komenoki – Nisshin – Akaike –

==== Subways ====
Nagoya Municipal Subway

- Tsurumai Line: – Akaike

=== Roads ===
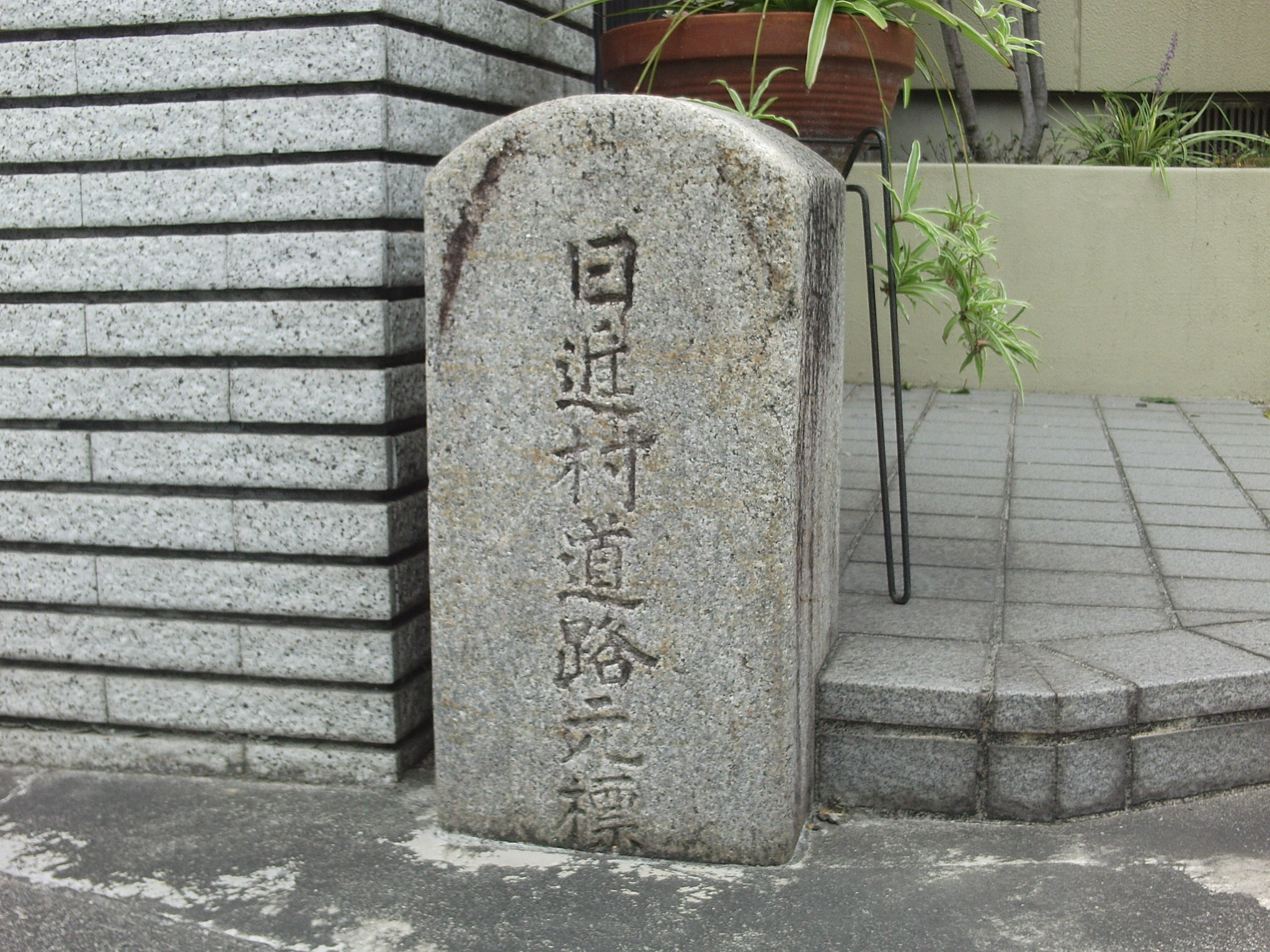
The Kilometre Zero of Nisshin

==== Expressways ====
- Tōmei Expressway
  - - Togo Parking Area –
- Nagoya-Seto Expressway

==== Japan National Route ====
- National Route 153
- National Route 302
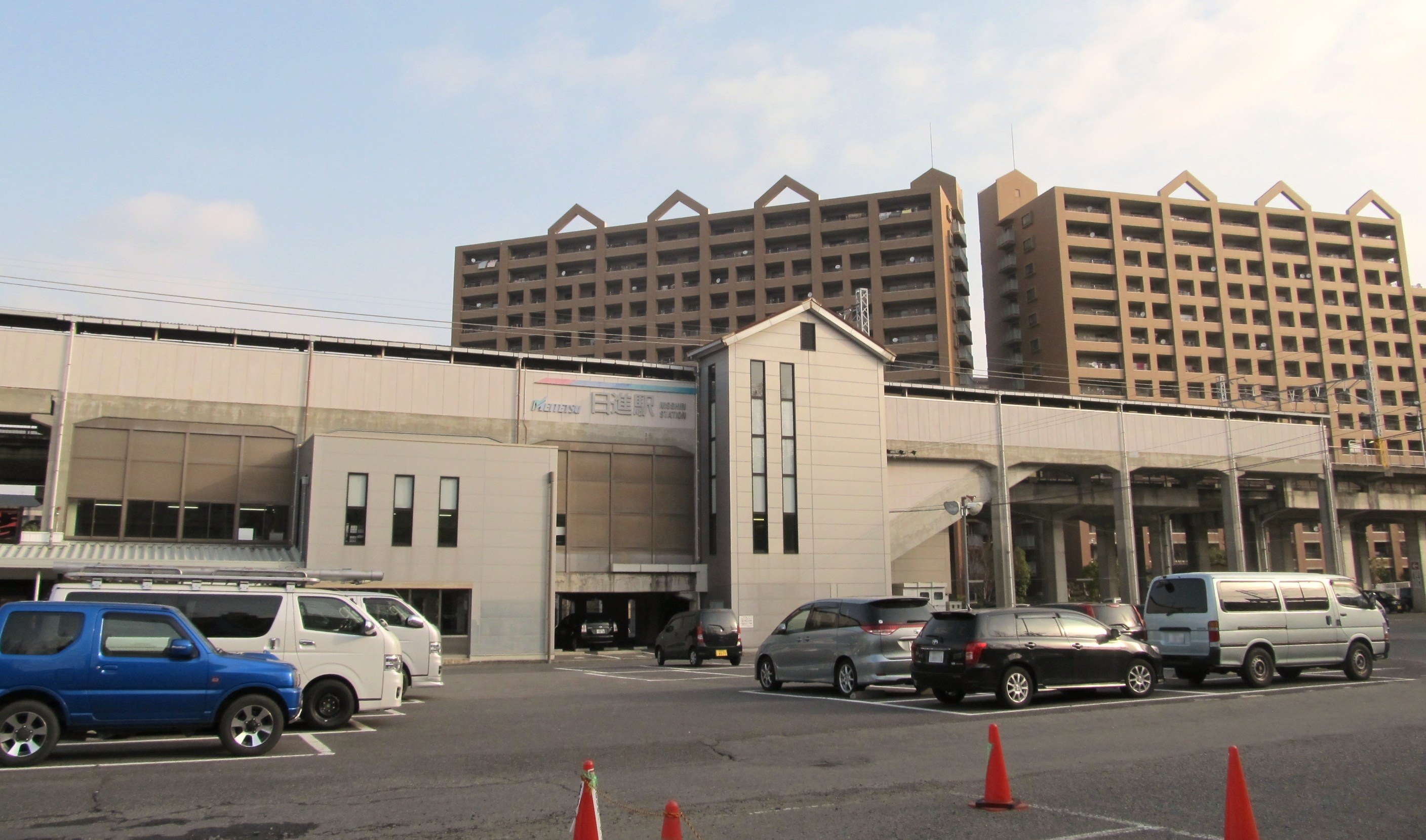
Nisshin Station

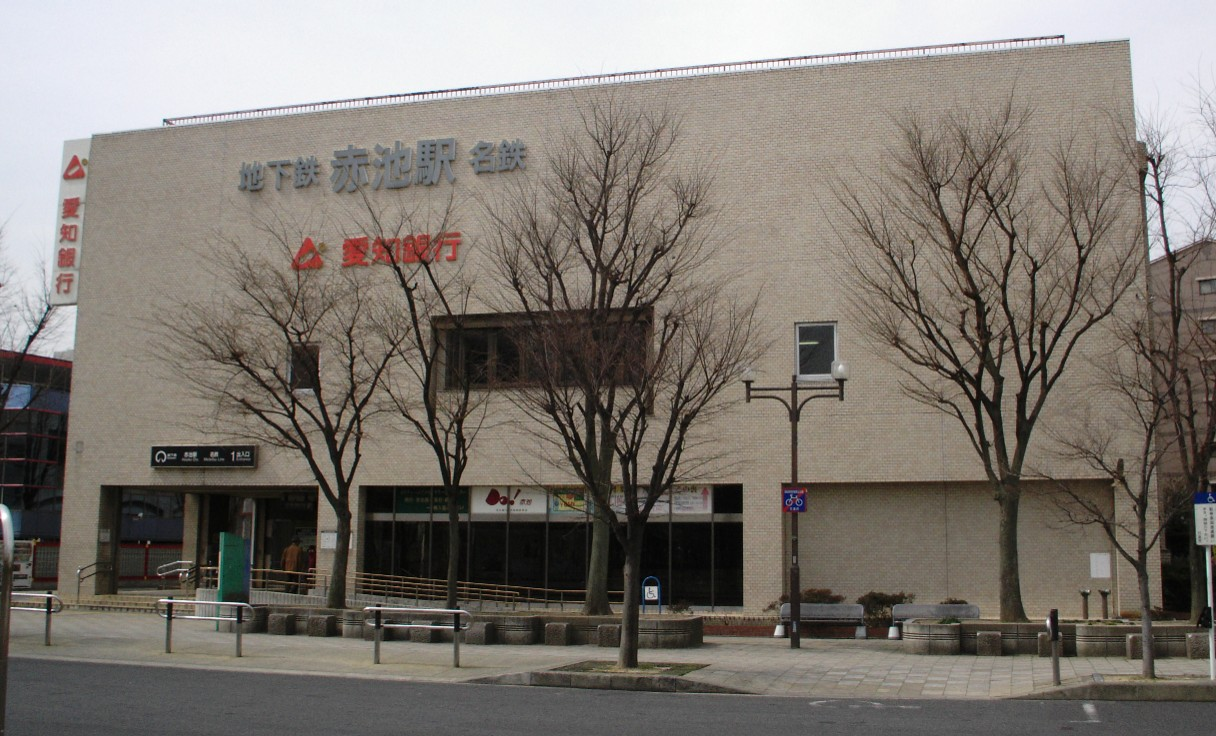
Akaike Station

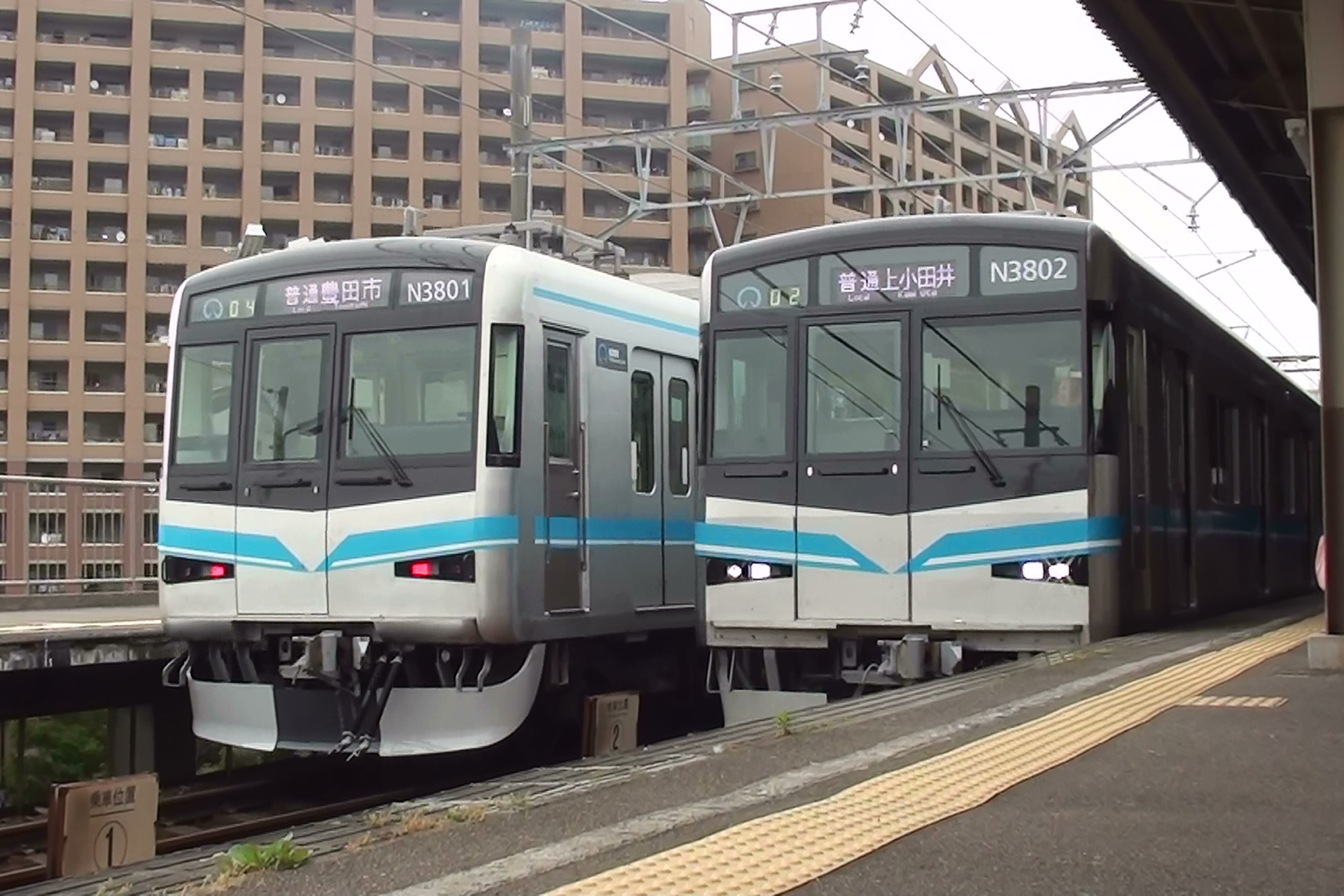
Tsurumai Line
(Meitetsu Toyota Line)

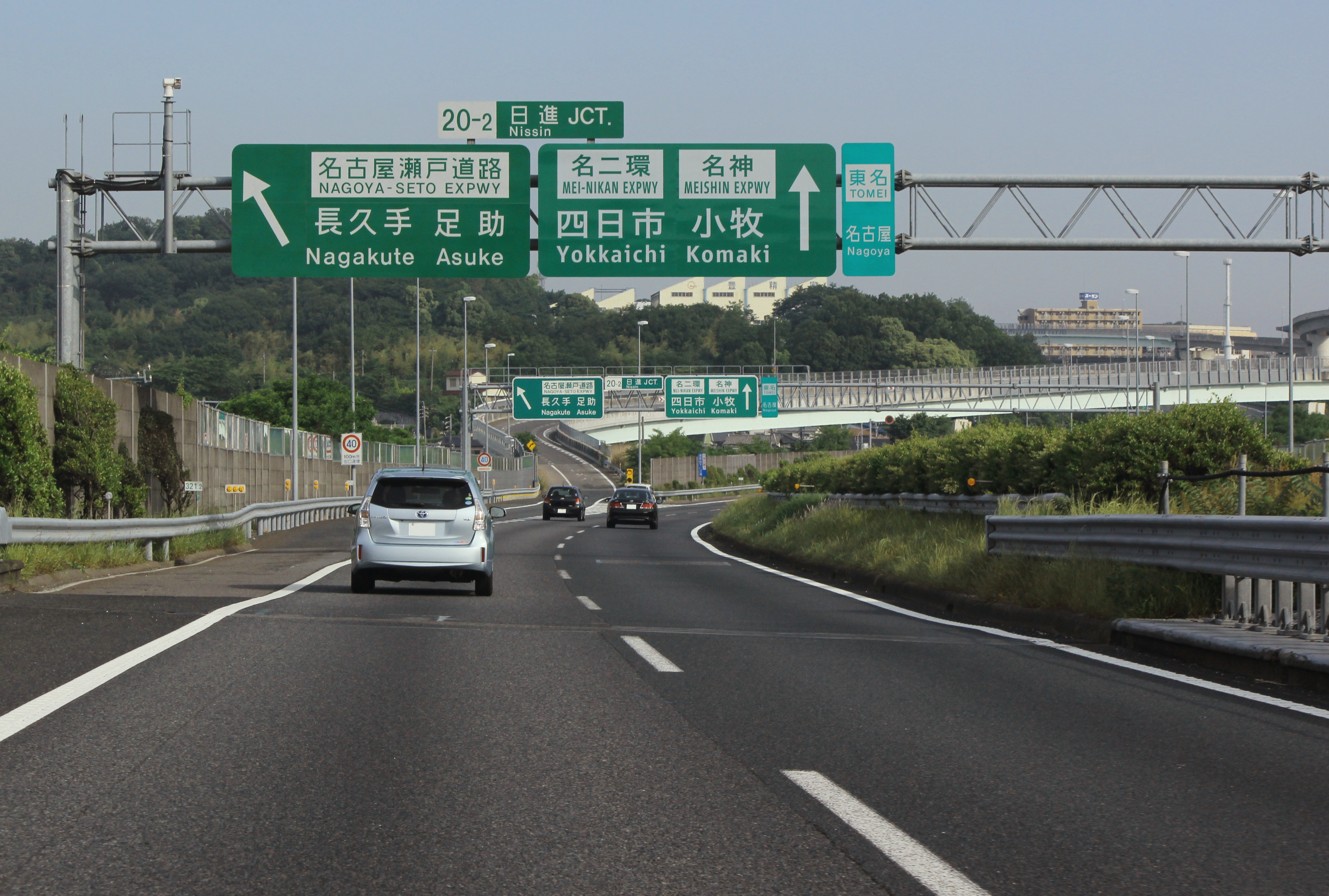
Nissin Junction

== Local attractions ==
=== Tourist attractions ===
Historic sites

- Hakusan-gu shrine
- Old Ichikawa House
- Ruins of Iwasaki Castle
- Myousen-ji temple]
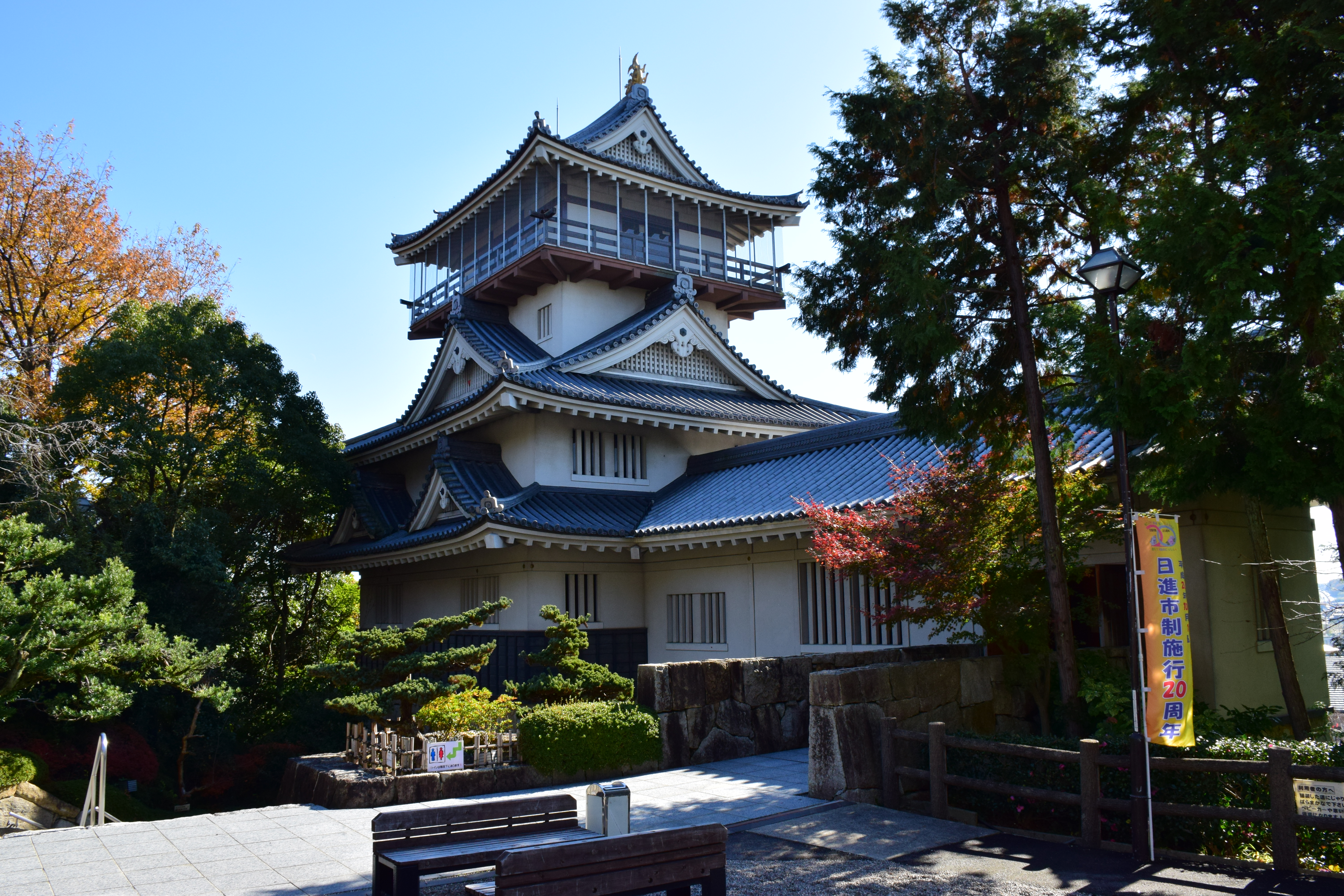
Iwasaki Castle

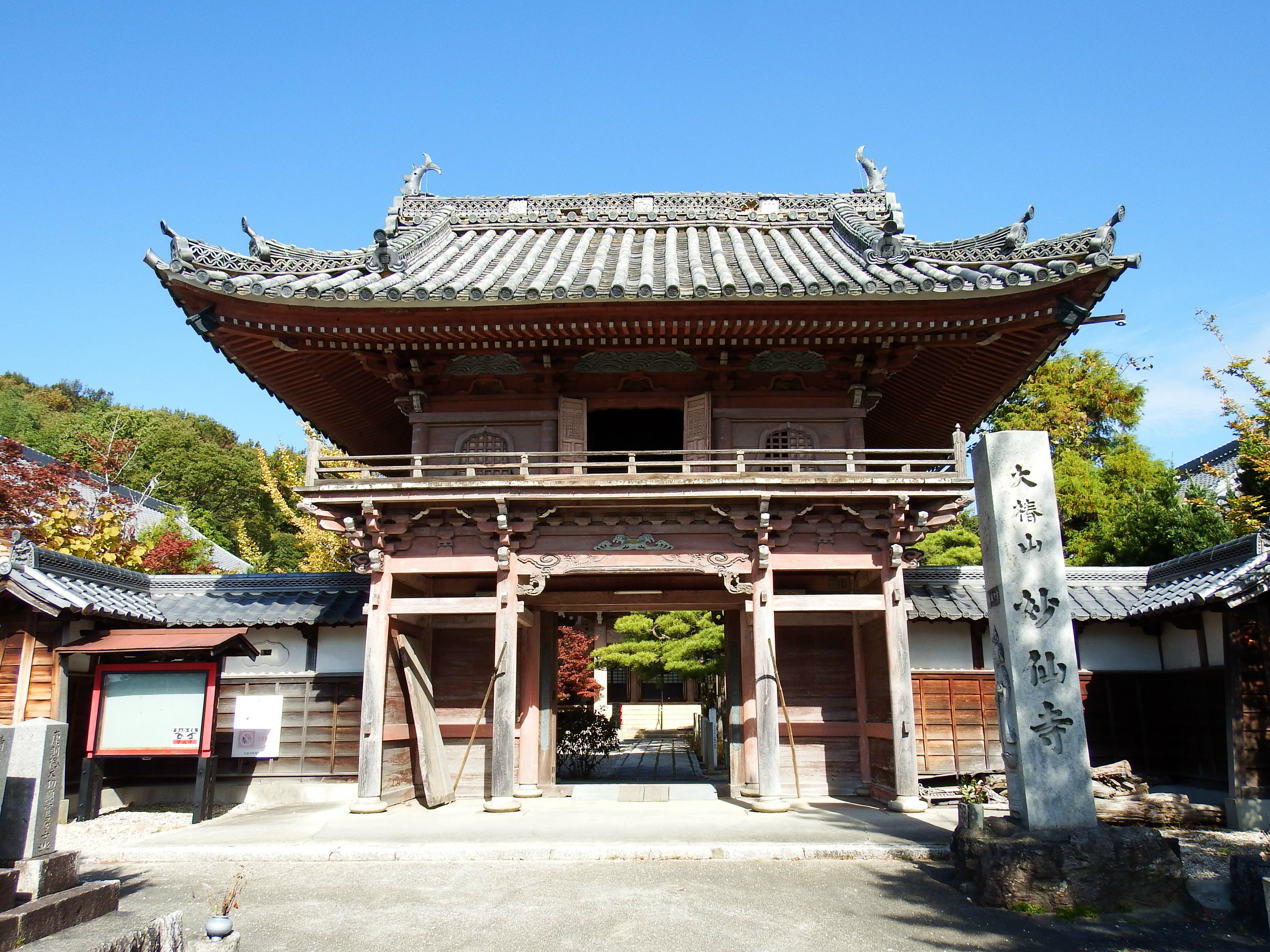
Myousen-ji

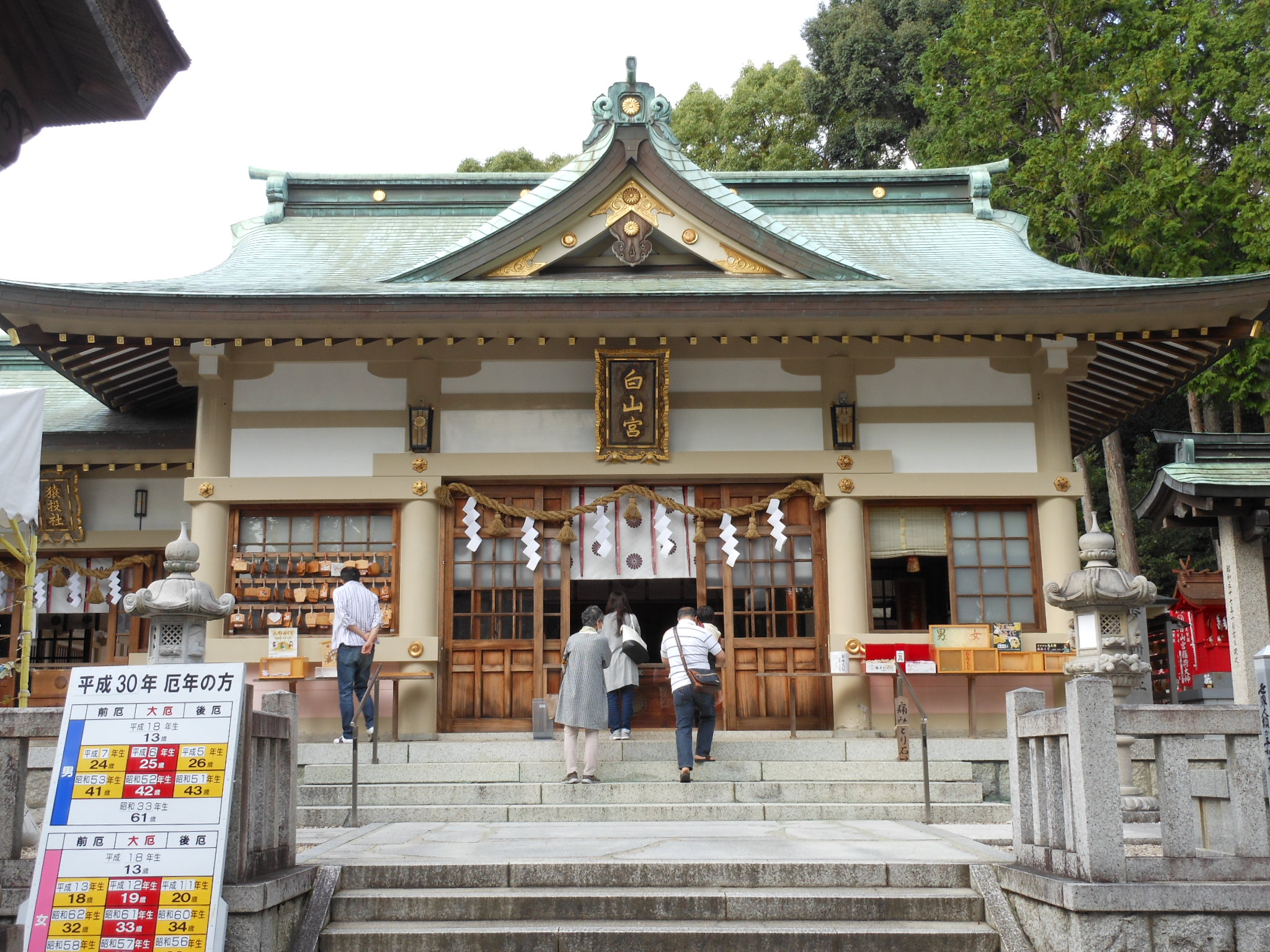
Hakusan-gu

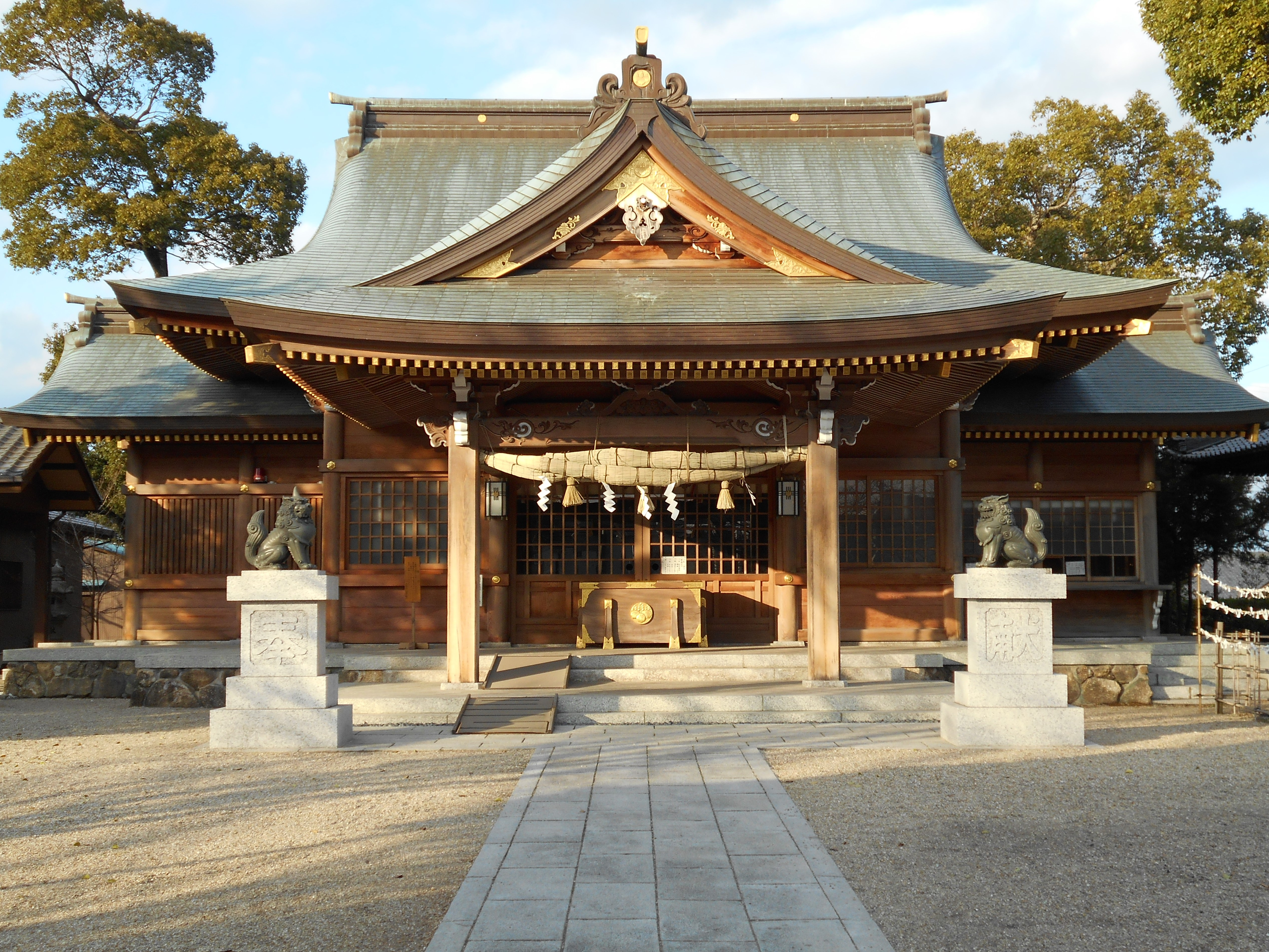
Tenchi Shrine

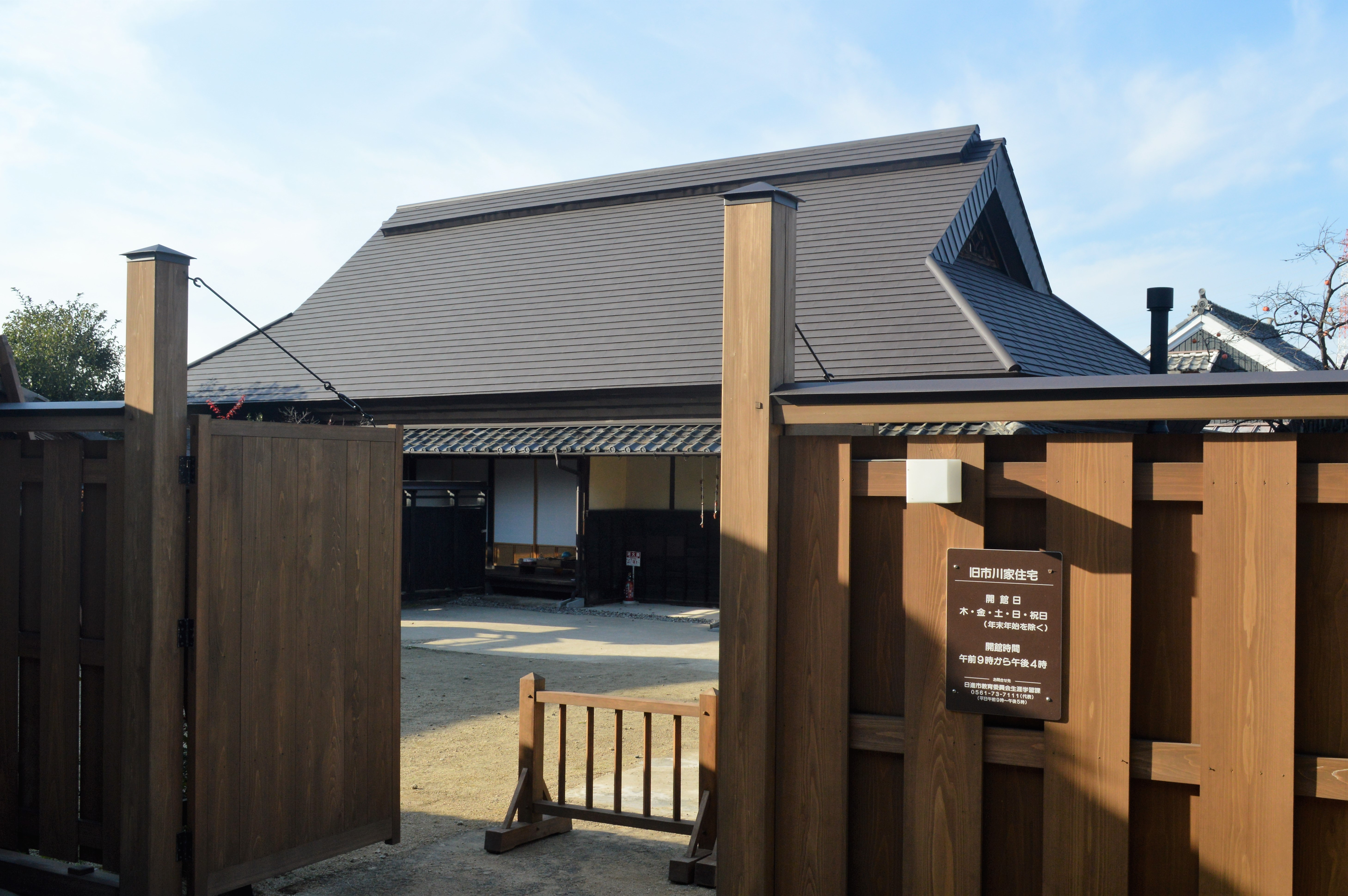
Old Ichikawa House

Parks

- Aichi Pond
- Aichi Ranch
- Goshikien

=== Museums ===
- Maspro Art Museum (マスプロ美術館)
- Nagoya City Tram & Subway Museum
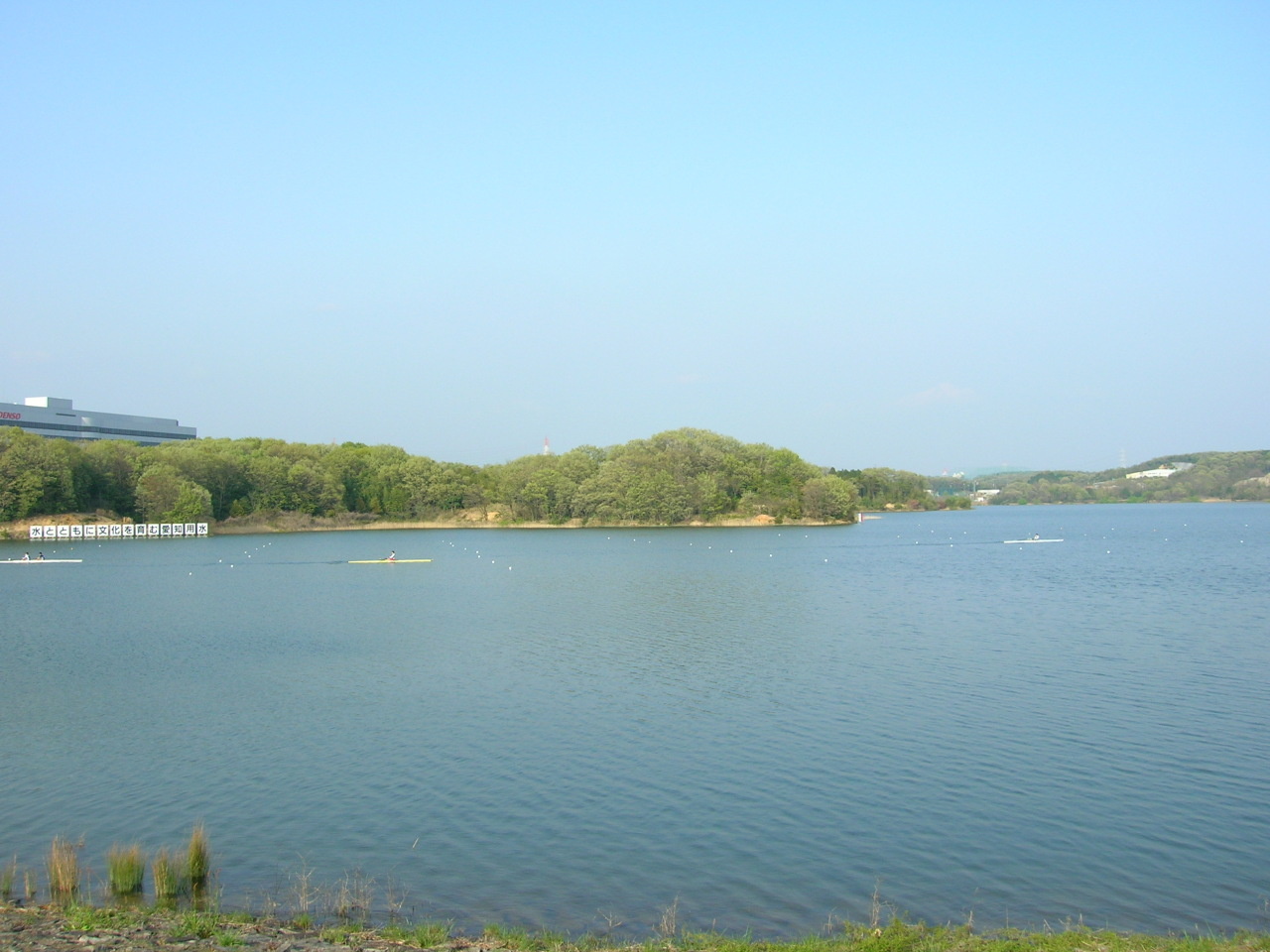
Aichi Pond

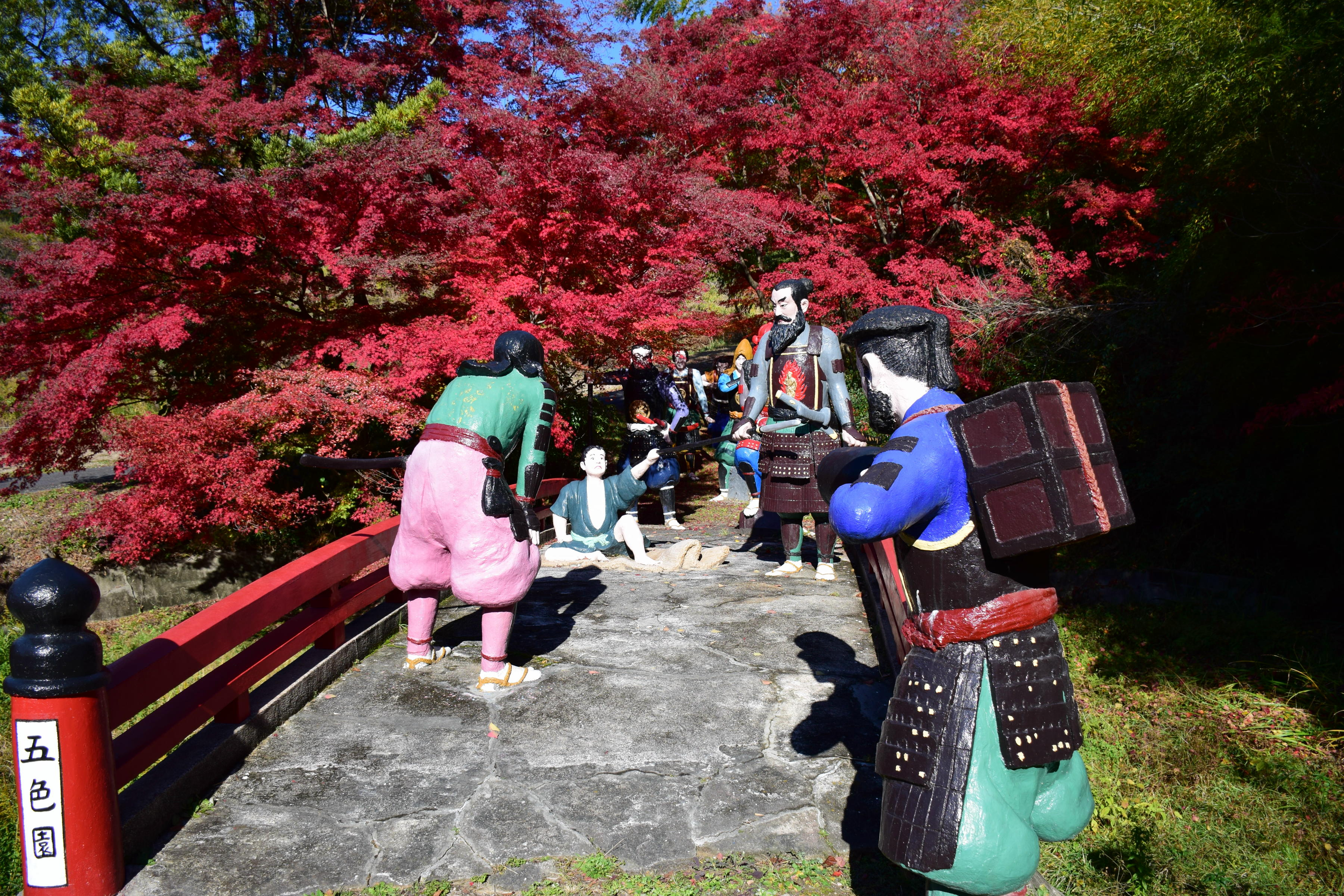
Goshikien

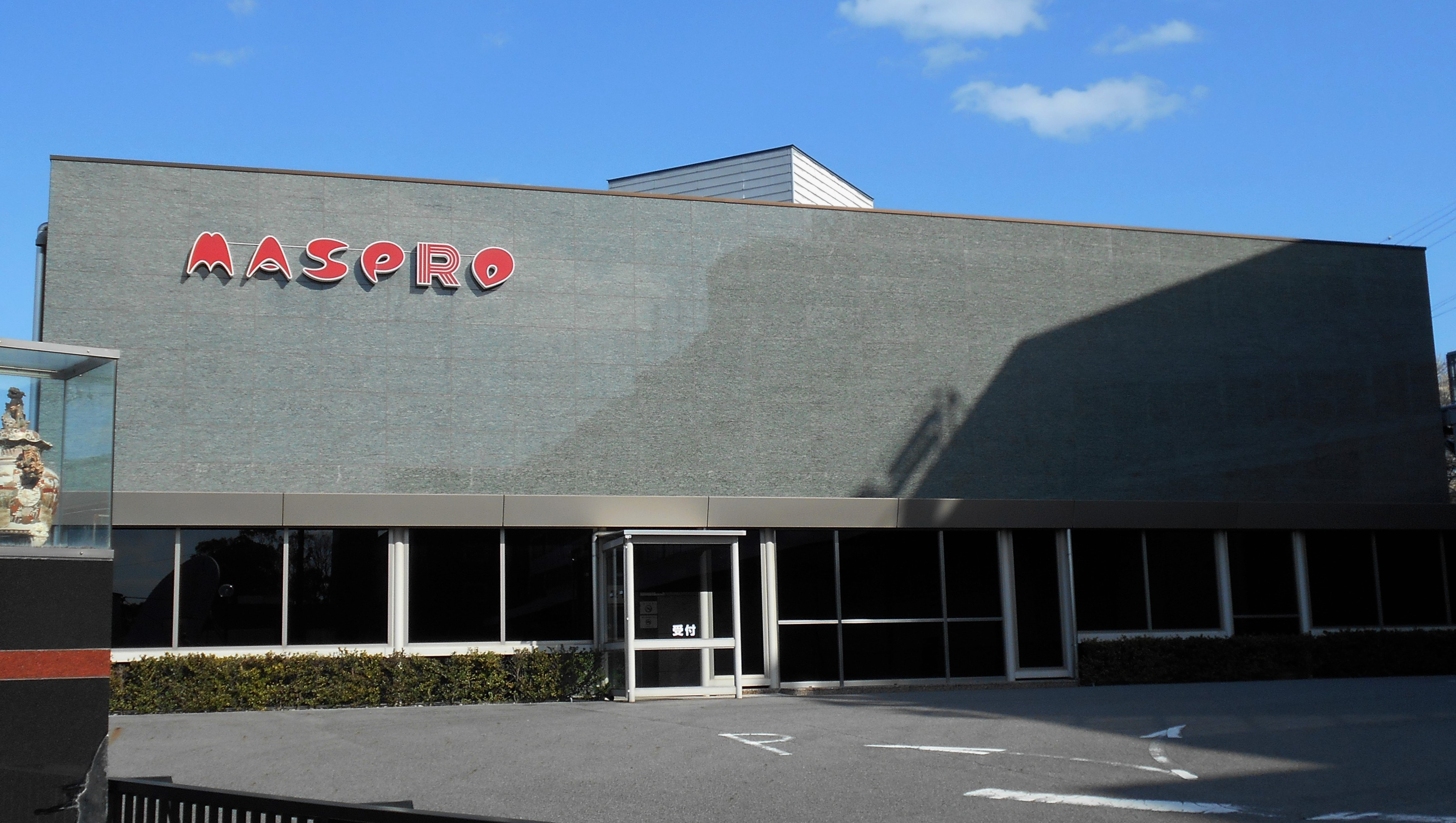
Maspro Art Museum

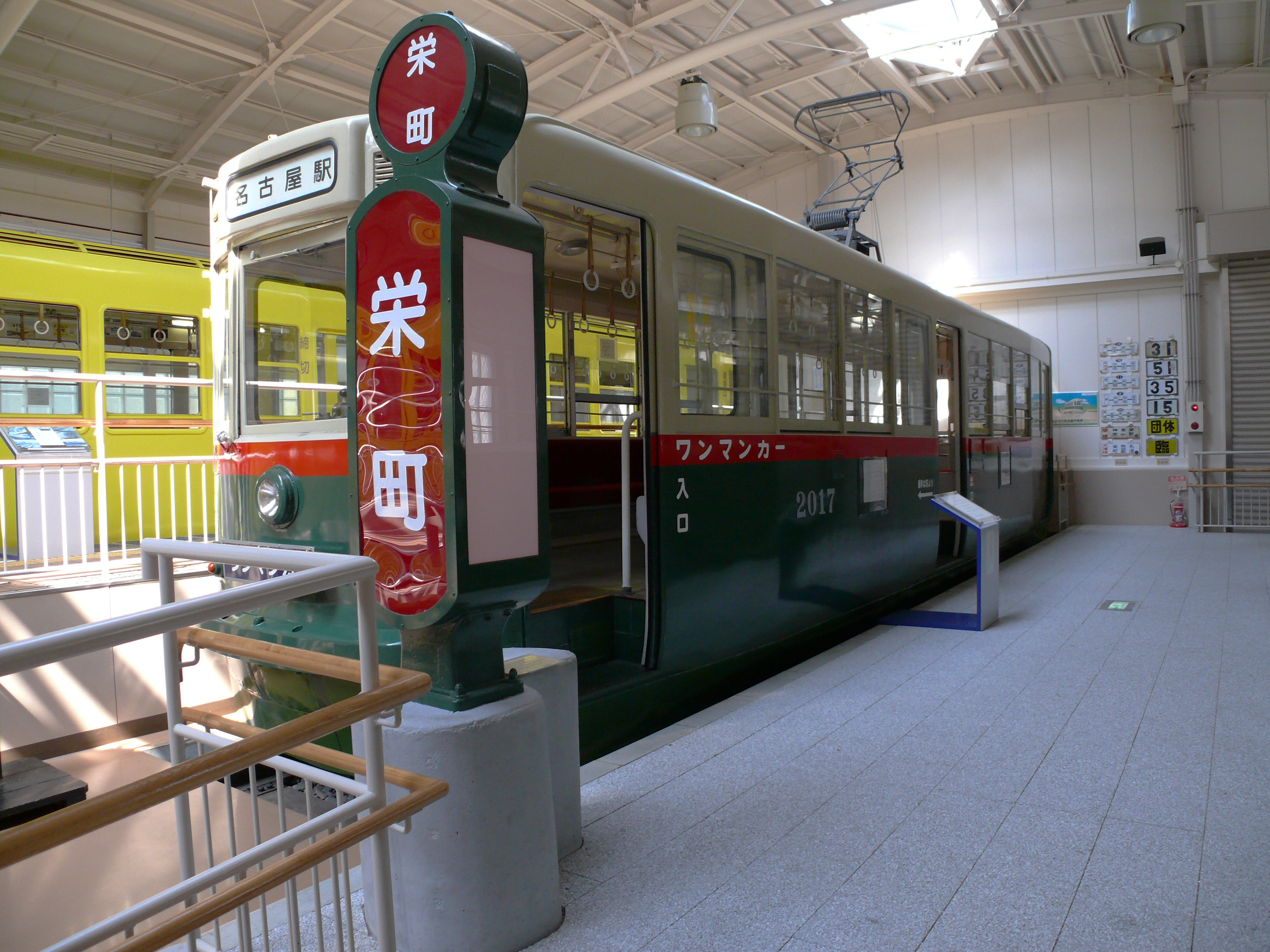
Nagoya City Tram & Subway Museum

== Notable people from Nisshin ==
- Michiko Hattori, professional golfer
- Akira Ishida, voice actor
- Hiroyuki Isobe, musician (member of Alexandros)
- Ayaka Suwa, voice actress
- Gorō Taniguchi, anime director, writer
