= Matsudaira Nobutada =

Japanese daimyō

Matsudaira family crest.

Matsudaira Nobutada (松平信忠, 1489–1531) was a Japanese daimyo during Sengoku period (1467–1600). He is mainly remembered in history as the paternal great-grandfather of Tokugawa Ieyasu.

== Biography ==
As a head of Matsudaira clan, Matsudaira Nobutada held Anjo castle in Mikawa province, and was frequently at war with his neighbors. As a minor daimyo of eastern Mikawa, in 1506 he was attacked by the more powerful Imagawa clan, who ruled most of Mikawa, Totomi and Suruga provinces. As an incompetent military commander and unpopular ruler, he was forced in early retirement in 1523, after which he became a Buddhist monk. He was succeeded by his son, Matsudaira Kiyoyasu (1511-1536).
