= Nagoya City Tram =

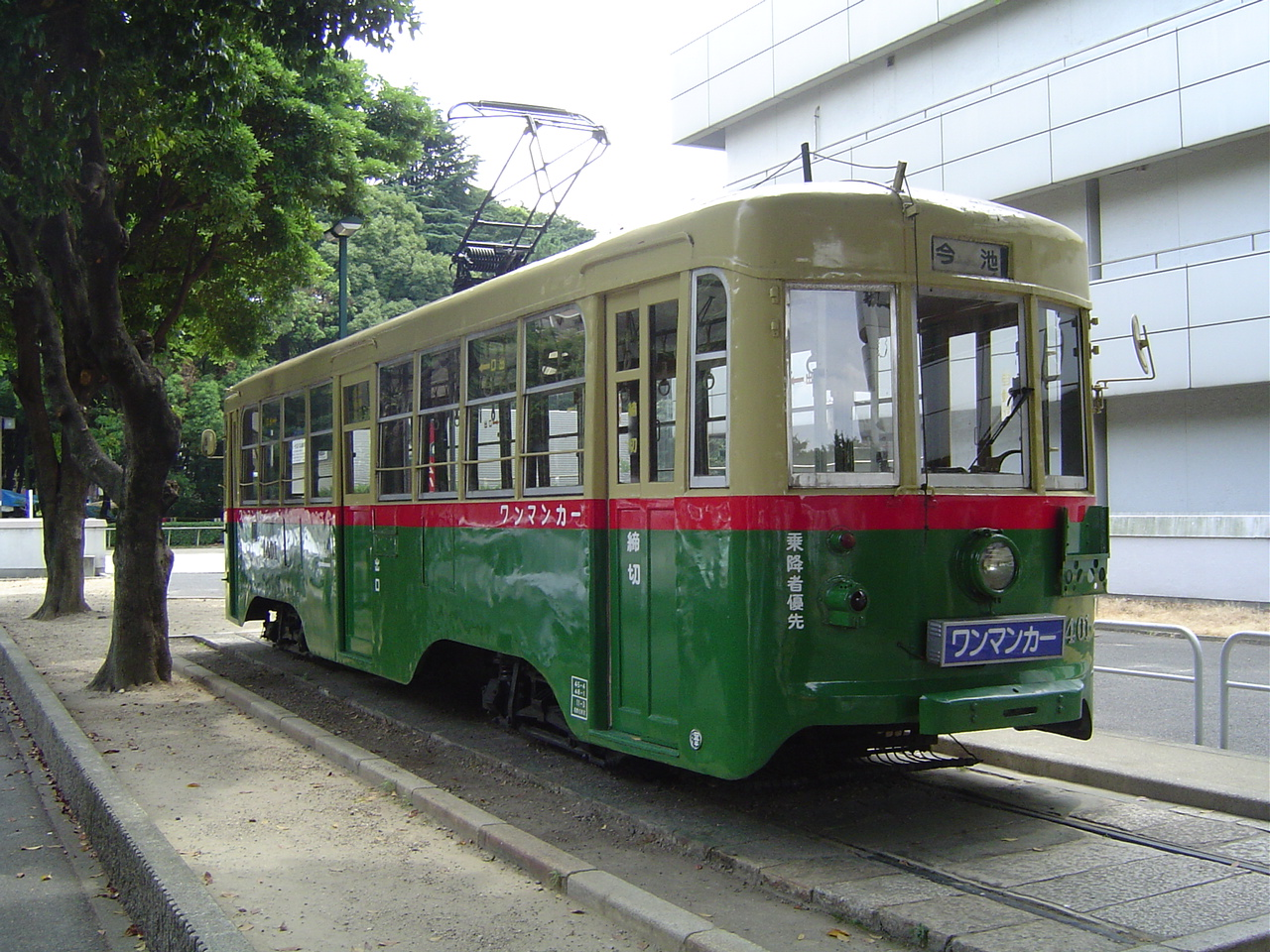
Nagoya City Tram 1401 at the Nagoya City Science Museum

Nagoya City Tram (Japanese: 名古屋市電) was a tram service in the Japanese city of Nagoya. It ran between 1898 and 1974, and was operated by the municipal Nagoya City Transportation Bureau.

Some of the old trams were saved and are kept in the Nagoya City Tram & Subway Museum and the Nagoya City Science Museum.
