= Battle of Idano =

- Part of Sengoku period
Date	December 5, 1535
Location	Mikawa province 34°58′44″N 137°10′02″E
Result	Matsudaira victory

Belligerents
Matsudaira forces	Abe Masatoyo forces

Commanders and leaders
Matsudaira Nobutaka; Matsudaira Yasutaka	Abe Masatoyo
- Location within Japan

The Battle of Idano (井田野合戦) was a battle during the Sengoku period (16th century) of Japan. The battle took place seven days after the murder of Matsudaira leader Kiyoyasu (grandfather of Tokugawa Ieyasu) at the hands of his vassal Abe Masatoyo.

The forces of Matsudaira set out to take revenge against the rebel Masatoyo and his army, and were victorious.
