= Matsudaira Hirotada =

Japanese nobleman (1526 – 1549)

Matsudaira Hirotada 松平 広忠

Head of Matsudaira clan
- In office 1535–1549
- Preceded by: Matsudaira Kiyoyasu
- Succeeded by: Tokugawa Ieyasu

Personal details
- Born: 9 June 1526
- Died: 3 April 1549 (aged 22); Okazaki, Aichi, Japan
- Spouse(s): Odai no Kata; Makihime
- Children: Tokugawa Ieyasu
- Parents: Matsudaira Kiyoyasu (father); Haruhime (mother)

Military service
- Allegiance: Imagawa clan
- Unit: Matsudaira clan
- Commands: Okazaki Castle
- Battles/wars: Siege of Anjō Castle (1540); Battle of Azukizaka (1542); Battle of Azukizaka (1548)

Matsudaira Hirotada (松平 広忠, 9 June 1526 – 3 April 1549) was the lord of Okazaki Castle in Mikawa province, Japan during the Sengoku Period of the 16th century. He is best known for being the father of Tokugawa Ieyasu, founder of the Tokugawa shogunate.

== Biography ==
Hirotada was the son of Matsudaira Kiyoyasu (seventh head of the Mikawa Matsudaira clan). He was known in his childhood as Senshōmaru, Senchiyo, and Jirōzaburō.

After his father's assassination in 1535, Hirotada was placed under the protection of a loyal retainer, Abe Sadayoshi. He allied with the Imagawa, and with their help was installed at Okazaki castle. The alliance with them brought him into conflict with the Oda clan.

In 1540, Oda Nobuhide attacked and took Anjō castle, which was held by the Matsudaira family. Hirotada was assisted by Mizuno Tadamasa. After Anjō castle was taken, Oda Nobuhide's son, Oda Nobuhiro, was installed as the lord of the castle.

In 1541, Hirotada married Mizuno Tadamasa's daughter, Okichi. A son, was born to them a year later, Matsudaira Takechiyo later known as Tokugawa Ieyasu.

Hirotada joined Imagawa Yoshimoto to fight Oda Nobuhide at the First Battle of Azukizaka in 1542, and were defeated.

In 1543, his uncle, Matsudaira Nobutaka, rebelled and joined Oda Nobuhide. Hirotada had a serious disagreement with his father-in-law, Mizuno Tadamasa. Later in 1544, he divorced Tadamasa daughter, Okichi. He then married the daughter of Toda Yasumitsu, Makihime.

== Death ==
In 1549, when his son Matsudaira Takechiyo (later known as Tokugawa Ieyasu) was six years old, Hirotada was murdered by his own vassals, who had been bribed by the Oda clan.

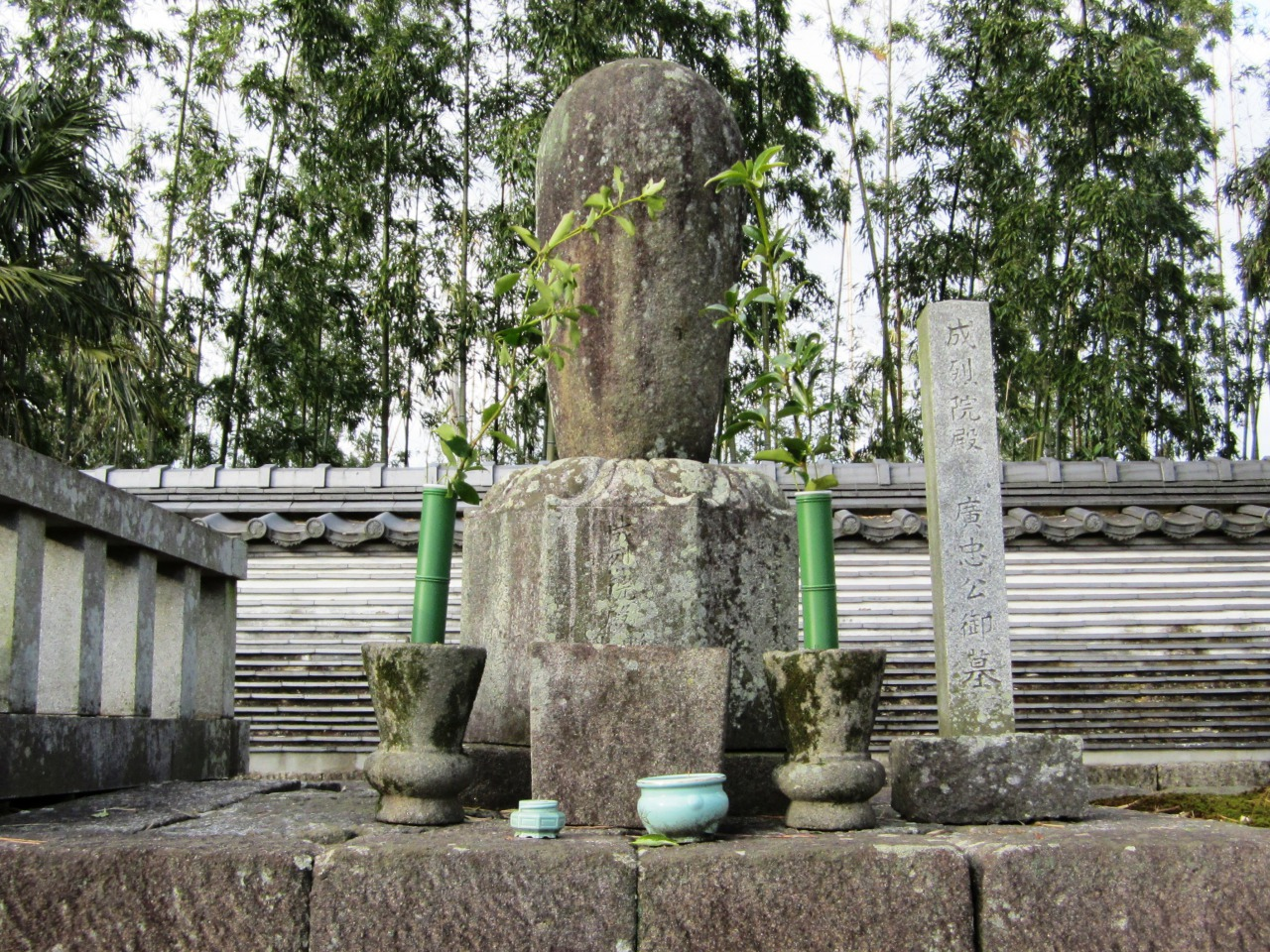
Grave of Matsudaira Hirotada at Daiju-ji in Okazaki, Aichi.

He was posthumously conferred the rank of Dainagon by his son Ieyasu in 1612.

== Family ==
=== Parents ===
Status	image	Name	posthumous Name	Birth	Death	Parents
Father		Matsudaira Kiyoyasu	Zentokuin-dono nenshoudohodaikoji	September 28, 1511	December 29, 1535	Matsudaira Nobutada (1490-September 8, 1531), Okochi Mitsunari's daughter
Mother		Haruhime				Matsudaira Masayasu (d.1525) of Ōkusa-Matsudaira clan

=== Wives and concubines ===
Status	Image	Name	posthumous Name	Birth	Death	Parents	Children
First Wife (divorce 1544)		Odai no Kata	Denzū-in	1528	October 13, 1602	Mizuno Tadamasa; Otomi-no-Kata	Matsudaira Motonobu
Second Wife		Makihime				Toda Yasumitsu (d.1547)	Ichibahime (d.1593) married to Arakawa Yoshihiro later to Tsutsui Sadatsugu of Iga-Ueno Domain
Concubine		Ohisa-no-kata				Matsudaira Norimasa of Ogyu-Matsudaira clan	Matsudaira Tadamasa (1544-1591); Esai
Concubine						Hirahara Clan	Yadahime married Matsudaira Yasutada (1546–1618) of Nagasawa-Matsudaira clan
Concubine		Omiyu-no-Kata					Matsudaira Iemoto
Concubine						Naito Clan	Naito Nobunari of Nagahama Domain

=== Children ===
Image	Name	posthumous Name	Birth	Death	Mother	Spouse	Children
	Matsudaira Motonobu	Hogo Onkokuin	January 31, 1543	June 1, 1616	Odai-no-Kata	First: Lady Tsukiyama; Second: Asahi no kata	By First: Tokugawa Nobuyasu; Kamehime married Okudaira Nobumasa of Kano Domain; By Concubines: First: Tokuhime married Hojo Ujinao later Ikeda Terumasa of Himeji Domain; Yuki Hideyasu of Fukui Domain; Tokugawa Hidetada; Matsudaira Tadayoshi of Fukui Domain; Furi-hime (1580-1617) married to Gamō Hideyuki of Aizu Domain later Asano Nagaakira of Hiroshima Domain; Takeda Nobuyoshi of Mito Domain; Matsudaira Tadateru of Takada Domain; Matsudaira Matsuchiyo of Fukaya Domain; Tokugawa Yoshinao of Owari Domain; Tokugawa Yorinobu of Kishu Domain; Tokugawa Yorifusa of Mito Domain; Senchiyo (1595-1600); Matsuhime (1595-1598); Ichi-hime (1607-1610)
	Matsudaira Tadamasa		1544	1591	Ohisa-no-Kata		Matsudaira Nagakiyo
	Esai				Ohisa-no-Kata		
	Yadahime				Hirahara clan's daughter	Matsudaira Yasutada (1546–1618) of Nagasawa-Matsudaira clan	Matsudaira Yasunao (1569–1593) of Fukaya Domain
	Matsudaira Iemoto	Shogenin	1548	September 19, 1603	Omiyu-no-Kata		
	Naito Nobunari of Nagahama Domain	Denzun-in-dono Yōtakesōkendaikoji	June 13, 1545	August 20, 1612	Naito clan's daughter	Awao Nagakatsu's daughter	Naito Nobumasa (1568–1626) of Nagahama Domain; Naito Nobuhiro (1592–1649); Daughter married Sanjo clan's man Daughter married Ide Masanobu; Daughter married Endō Toshiharu; Daughter married Niwa Sadaaki later Momiyama Sadamasa
	Ichibahime			June 1, 1593	Makihime	First: Arakawa Yoshihiro; Second: Tsutsui Sadatsugu of Iga-Ueno Domain	Arakawa Hirotsuna; Arakawa Ienori daughter married Matsudaira Kanemitsu
	Matsudaira Chikayoshi						

== Ancestry ==
Ancestors of Matsudaira Hirotada

8. Matsudaira Nagachika (1473-1544)
4.Matsudaira Nobutada (1490-1531)
9. Gekkū Jōun (d. 1527)
2. Matsudaira Kiyoyasu (1511-1535)
10. Ōkōchi Mitsushige
5. Iwakura-dono Masako Mitsunaka
1. Matsudaira Hirotada
12. Matsudaira Mitsushige (d. 1508)
6. Matsudaira Masayasu (d. 1525)
13. Saigō Yoritsugu's daughter
3. Haruhime
