= Takeru Kiyonaga =

Japanese footballer

Takeru Kiyonaga 清永 丈瑠
Personal information
- Full name: Takeru Kiyonaga
- Date of birth: October 24, 1994 (age 32)
- Place of birth: Yamaguchi, Japan
- Height: 1.76 m (5 ft 9 1/2 in)
- Position: Midfielder

Team information
- Current team: Renofa Yamaguchi
- Number: 20

Youth career
- 2010–2012: Kashima Antlers Youth
- 2013–2016: Kansai University

Senior career*
Years	Team	Apps	(Gls)
2017–	Renofa Yamaguchi	15	(0)
- * Club domestic league appearances and goals as of 1 January 2019

Takeru Kiyonaga (清永 丈瑠, Kiyonaga Takeru; born October 24, 1994) is a Japanese football player. He plays for Renofa Yamaguchi FC.

== Career ==
Takeru Kiyonaga joined J2 League club Renofa Yamaguchi FC in 2017.

== Club statistics ==
Updated to 22 February 2018.

Club performance			League		Cup		Total	
Season	Club	League	Apps	Goals	Apps	Goals	Apps	Goals
Japan			League		Emperor's Cup		Total	
2017	Renofa Yamaguchi	J2 League	9	0	1	0	10	0
Total			9	0	1	0	10	0
