= Naitō Genzaemon =

Japanese samurai

Naitō Genzaemon (内藤 源左衛門) was a Japanese samurai who served Oda Nobunaga. He was given Kameyama (200,000 koku) in Tanba Province.
