= Nagoya University of Foreign Studies =

Japanese university

- 名古屋外国語大学(NUFS)
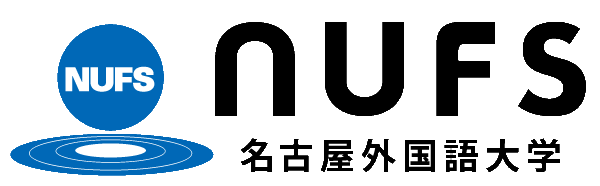
- Type: Private
- Established: April 1, 1988
- Affiliations: Nakanishi Educational Foundation
- President: Ikuo Kameyama
- Vice-president: Masako Umegaki; Toshiko Ellis; Takashi Tsunekawa
- Academic staff: 156
- Administrative staff: 86
- Students: 4617 (+131 Inter-st.)
- Undergraduates: 4,286
- Location: Nisshin, Aichi, Japan; 35.158°N 137.043°E
- Nickname: NUFS
- Website: www.nufs.ac.jp

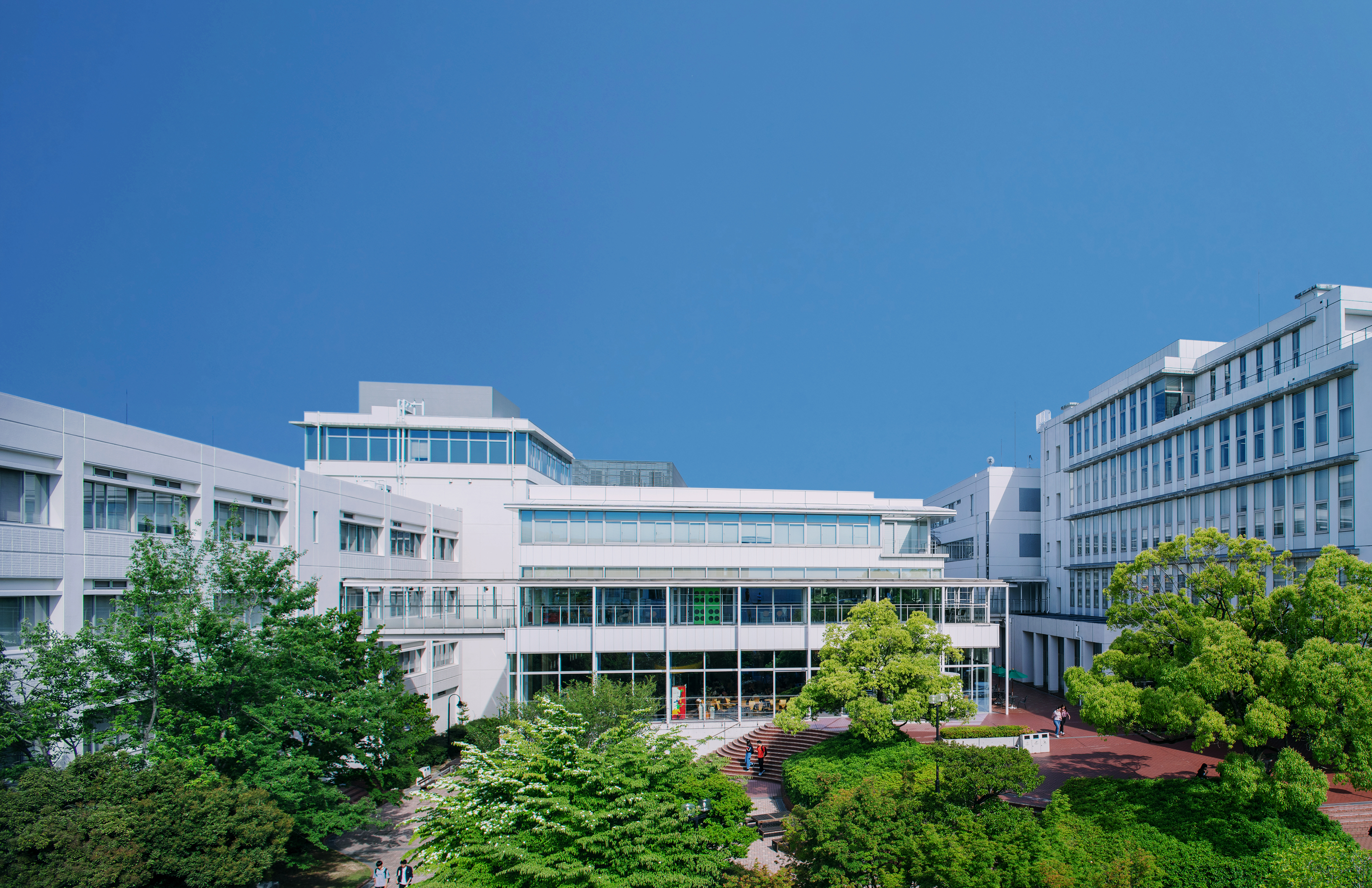
Nagoya University of Foreign Studies

Nagoya University of Foreign Studies (名古屋外国語大学, Nagoya gaikokugo daigaku) is a private university located in the city of Nisshin, Aichi, Japan. Founded in 1988, it is known domestically as Nagoya Gaidai (名古屋外大) and its English abbreviation as NUFS.

== Overview ==
Nagoya University of Foreign Studies (NUFS) is the only university specializing in international studies and foreign languages education in the Chubu (Central) Region of Japan. Its programs aim to develop students with genuine international and global perspectives through a distinctive education system; language, liberal arts and specialized education. It offers small-group teaching, which takes place in groups of four students and a native teacher for all major language courses, so that students can acquire genuine language skills. NUFS, which has more than 300 foreign teachers and students from all over the world, has an international campus that is integrated in the following five domains: study abroad programs; active learning; native speakers; career support; and an international campus. It belongs to the Association of 7 GAIDAI (Foreign Studies Universities) in Japan. It ranks 101st in the THE (Times Higher Education) Japan University Rankings 2025 and ranks 9th in their pillar of internationalization among about 750 universities.

== History ==
1988 — Founded Nagoya University of Foreign Studies (Department of British and American Studies, Department of French Studies and Department of Chinese Studies.

1994 — Opened School of Global Business and Economics.

1997 — Opened Graduate School of International Studies.

1999 — Established Doctoral Program (second semester) at Graduate School of International Studies. Reorganized Master's Program into Doctoral Program (first semester). Opened Department of Japanese Studies.

2001 — Established Japanese Language Institute (afterwards renamed to The International Institute for Japanese Language Education).

2004 — Opened School of Contemporary International Studies (the Department of English and Contemporary Society and the Department of Global Business).

2008 — Established the Department of English Language Teaching in the School of Foreign Studies.

2013 — Established the Department of Liberal Arts and Global Studies in the School of Contemporary International Studies.

2015 — Established the Department of World Liberal Arts.

2017 — Opened School of Global Governance and Collaboration (the Department of Global Governance and Collaboration).

2019 — Opened School of World Liberal Arts (the Department of World Liberal Arts and the Department of International Japanese Studies).

{{|date=August 2025}}

== Facilities ==
=== Campus ===
The NUFS campus is situated in the hill country east of Nagoya City. This area of Nissin City includes the campuses of several other universities as well, so it is considered an academic zone.

=== Dormitory ===
Very close to the university campus is the dormitory for overseas exchange students, who mainly come from the school's partner universities around the world. Aside from the foreign residents, some of the graduate and undergraduate students are selected as Resident Assistants.

- International House
- Global Village
- NUFS-NUAS residence

== Schools ==
=== Undergraduate Schools ===
- School of Foreign Studies
  - Department of British and American Studies
  - Department of French Studies
  - Department of Chinese Studies
- School of Contemporary International Studies
  - Department of English and Contemporary Society
  - Department of Global Business
  - Department of Liberal Arts and Global Studies
- School of Global Governance and Collaboration
  - Department of Global Governance and Collaboration
- School of World Liberal Arts
  - Department of World Liberal Arts
  - Department of International Japanese Studies

=== Graduate School of International Studies ===
- Master’s Programs
  - English and English Language Education (English and English Language Education Program)・・・ Master of Arts in English and English Language Education
  - English and English Language Education (TESOL Program)・・・・ Master of Arts in English and English Language Education
  - Japanese and Japanese Language Education・・・・ Master of Arts in Japanese and Japanese Language Education
  - Global Communication・・・・・ Master of Arts in Global Communication Studies
- Doctoral Programs
  - English Language Studies and English Language Pedagogy・・・・Doctor of Philosophy in English Linguistics and English Pedagogy
  - Japanese Language Studies and Japanese Language Pedagogy・・・・ Doctor of Philosophy in Japanese Linguistics and Japanese Pedagogy
  - Global Communication・・・・・ Doctor of Philosophy in Global Communication Studies

=== Programs for Inbound Studies (The International Institute for Japanese Language Education) ===
Nagoya University of Foreign Studies offers three unique programs for exchange students coming from partner institutions.

- Study Exchange Program: Global Japan Program
- Study Abroad at NUFS Undergraduate and Graduate Schools
- Study Abroad - Language Teaching Practicum Program

== Research institute ==
- World Liberal Arts Center (WLAC)(www.nufs.ac.jp/library_facilities/wla-center/)
- Research Institute for New Global Society (RINGS)(nufsrings.org)
- Dostoevsky Society of Japan (DSJ)(www.dsjn.jp)

== Publishing house ==
- Nagoya University of Foreign Studies Press (www.nufs.ac.jp/library_facilities/publication/)
