= Naitō Nobunari =

Japanese samurai (1545–1612)

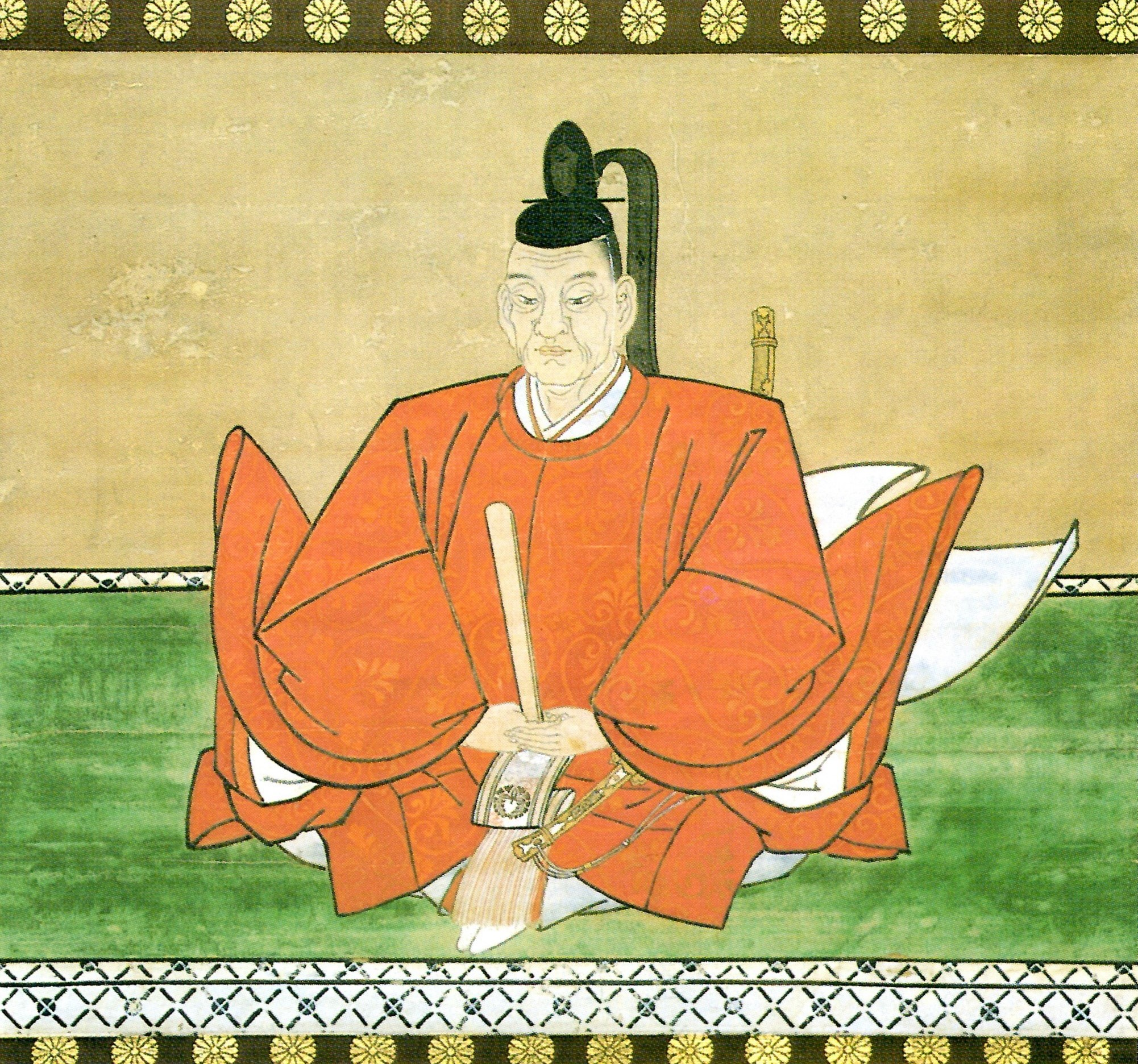
Naitō Nobunari

Naitō Nobunari (内藤 信成, June 13, 1545 – August 20, 1612) was a Japanese samurai of the Sengoku period through early Edo period, who served the Tokugawa clan; he later became a daimyō.

Nobunari is believed to have been the illegitimate son of Matsudaira Hirotada (which would make him the half-brother of Tokugawa Ieyasu). He was later adopted by Naitō Kiyonaga. As the years passed on with his brother's succession to headship and the birth of the Tokugawa, Nobunari primarily acted as the former's page, but ascended to a greater means of ranking after supporting in the 1565 assault against Mikawa monk rioters. After distinguishing himself in battle during a certain assault upon Kuroma castle at a later time

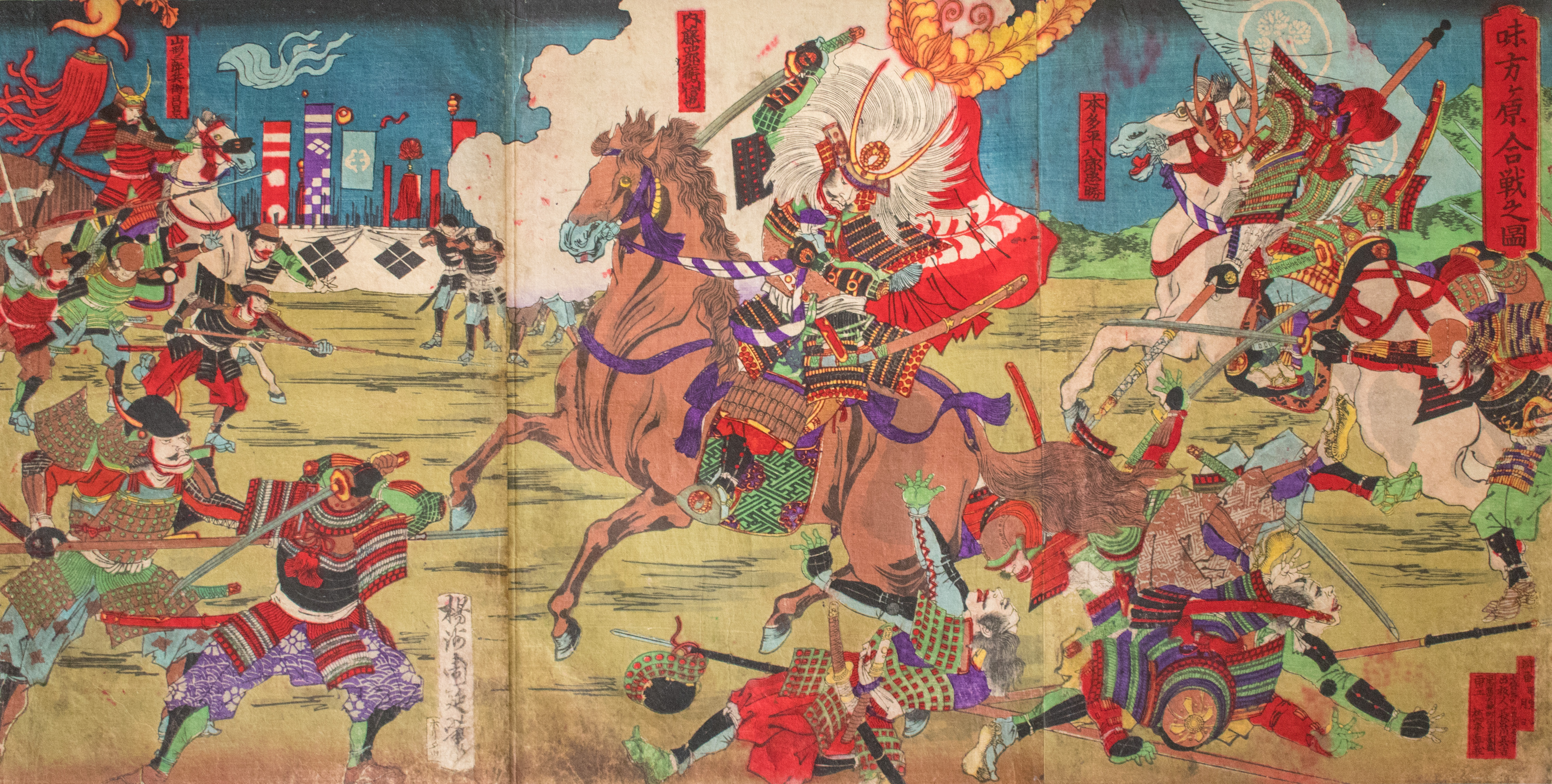
“Illustration of the Battle of Hitokotosaka” by Shunobu: Naitō Nobunari in the center, Honda Tadakatsu on the right

In 1572, during the Takeda clan campaign in Mikawa, Nobunari participated in the forces of Tokugawa. Ieyasu sent him, Honda Tadakatsu, and Ōkubo Tadasuke, to lead the vanguard, where they meet Takeda forces led by Yamagata Masakage and Baba Nobuharu at the battle of Hitokotosaka. It is said that in this battle Tadakatsu gained recognition from the enemy forces for his antler helmet and his Tonbo-giri spear for his exploit in staving off the charges of Baba Nobuharu units. In the end of this battle, Tadakatsu and Naitō Nobunari fought well, as both of them managed to break through from the encirclement attempts by Takeda forces and managed to lead the Tokugawa forces to escape safely.

In 1573, Nobunari went on to respectively support the Tokugawa within the Battle of Mikatagahara in 1573, and Nagashino of 1575, where he showed at least moderate ability on both battlefields. By the year of 1590, Nobunari would be awarded Nirayama Castle of Izu Province—respectively holding 10,000 koku to its name—and would enter into the Edo period with a 50,000 koku fief at Nagahama within Ōmi Province, where he remained as daimyō until he died in 1612.

During the Battle of Sekigahara in 1600, he defended Mimabashi Castle in Numazu, Suruga Province. Just before the battle, when Ieyasu stopped by Numazu, Nobunari expressed a wish to serve alongside Ieyasu instead of defending the castle. However, Ieyasu told him the importance to defend the castle.

In the Edo period painting, Nobunari was depicted as one of the Tokugawa 28 generals (Tokugawa nijūhachishinshōjin).

== Family ==
- Father: Matsudaira Hirotada
- Mother: Naito no Tsubone
- Wife: Awao Nagakatsu's daughter
- Children:
  - Naito Nobumasa (1568-1626)
  - Naito Nobuhiro (d.1619)
  - Naito Nobusuke

Preceded by Yamauchi Kazutoyo	Daimyō of Nagahama; 1606–1612	Succeeded by Naitō Nobumasa
