= Naitō Kiyonaga =

Japanese samurai

Naitō Kiyonaga (内藤 清長) (1501 – September 17, 1564) was a Japanese samurai of the Sengoku period, who served the Matsudaira clan of Mikawa Province.

A Naito Kiyonaga died fighting in the Battle of Nagashino.
