= Melle =

Melle may refer to:

== People ==
- Basil Melle (1891–1966), South African cricketer
- Gil Mellé (1931–2004), American artist, jazz musician and film composer
- Ieva Melle (born 1985), Latvian archer
- John van Melle (1887–1953), Dutch-born South African author
- Melle Mel (born 1961), American rapper
- Michael Melle (1930–2003), South African cricketer
- Sunnyi Melles (born 1958), German actress
- Werner von Melle (1853–1937), German mayor and senator of Hamburg
- Nellie Lisa Melles, 2nd Baroness Burton (1873 –1962), British aristocrat

== Places ==
- Canton of Melle, an administrative division of Deux-Sèvres, France
- Melle, Deux-Sèvres, a commune in Poitou-Charentes, France
- Mellé, Ille-et-Vilaine, a commune in Ille-et-Vilaine, Brittany, France
- Melle, Belgium, a former municipality in East Flanders, Belgium
- Melle, Germany, a city in Osnabrück, Lower Saxony, Germany
- Melle, Piedmont, a municipality in Cuneo, Piedmont, Italy
- Mali Empire, of which Melle is one variant spelling

== Other ==
- Melle (film), a 2017 Indian (Malayalam) romantic film

== See also ==
- Melles
- Le Melle
