= Transvaal Memorial Hospital for Children =

- Transvaal Provincial Administration
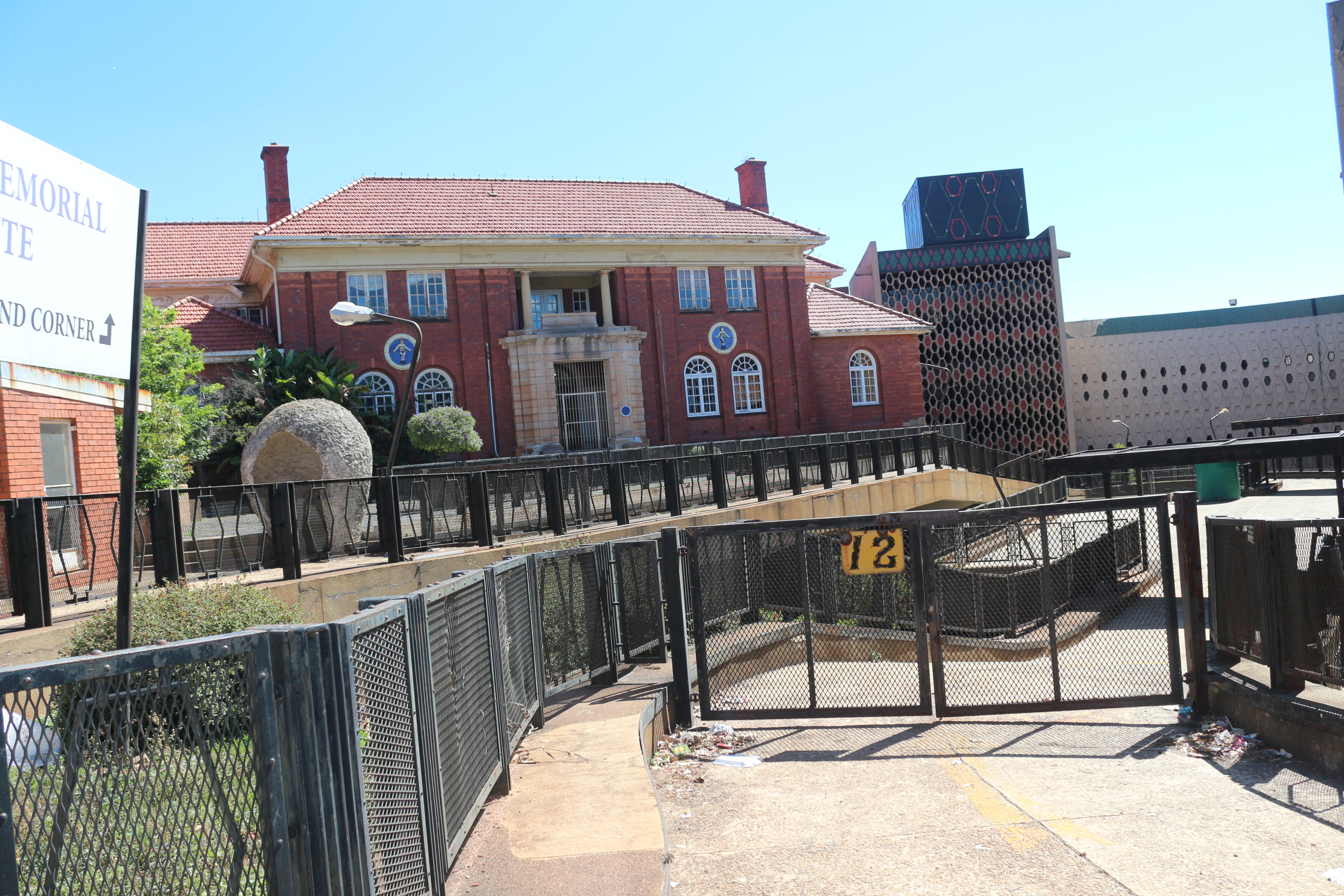

Geography
- Location: Braamfontein, Johannesburg, Gauteng, South Africa

Organisation
- Care system: Public
- Type: Specialist

Services
- Speciality: Teaching

History
- Opened: 1923
- Closed: 1978

Links
- Lists: Hospitals in South Africa

The Transvaal Memorial Hospital for Children, based in Johannesburg, was the first dedicated children's hospital in South Africa when it opened in 1923. The hospital would remain open until 1978 when its functions were moved to the then newly opened Johannesburg General Hospital. The building is a heritage listed monument and parts of the building are currently used by community groups dedicated to the service of children.

== History ==
=== Origin ===
The concept for a dedicated hospital for children in the Transvaal began in October 1919 when members of the Johannesburg Branch of the National Council of Women (NCW) discussed the need at a gathering. Two months later on 8 December 1919, the NCW met in Johannesburg and a resolution was passed to build a Children's Hospital which commemorates the deaths of Transvaal men during the First World War. A committee consisting of members of the Transvaal community was formed under Viscountess Buxton to help realise the idea of a 100-bed hospital with accommodation for medical staff and nurses.

The collection of funds for the project began with the Johannesburg Town Council donating 8ha of land at Milner Park in Braamfontein as well as £12,000 for the project. The South African Red Cross donated money collected for its efforts during the First World War to the fund. Other organisations donated resulting in the naming of wards such as Red Cross, Musicians, Sunday Times, Primary Schools and Berlein. More organisations such as mining companies, town councils from across the Witwatersrand, businesses and individuals donated money towards cots, theatres, medical and surgical equipment.

=== Design ===
After winning a competition, the hospital was designed by the architectural firm, Cowin, Powers & Ellis. The foundation stone was laid in December 1921 by the Governor-General, Prince Arthur of Connaught with the hospital officially opened on 29 October 1923 and the first patient arrived on 3 November 1923. It was then handed over to the Transvaal Provincial Administration and the Johannesburg Hospital. The hospital buildings and nurses home cost £108,258 while the cost of equipping it was around £13,000.

The original main building is red face-brick with a terraced garden facing north at an angle to Joubert Street. Two roundels, in the style of the 1400s Italian sculptor Luca della Robbia are found on the main facade of the building. The main building consisted of a memorial hall on the ground floor with six wards of 112 beds, two operating theatres and radiology and physiotherapy departments with a nurses' home on the grounds. In the centre of the main building, there is a memorial hall with bronze plaques lit by skylights that commemorate those who have endowed money for cots and two altars with scrolls dedicating the names of some of the men of the Transvaal who lost their lives during the First World War.

In the central blocks, the ground floor contained the admission and casualty section dispensary, small lecture theatre, staff room and administrative offices. The upper floors on this block contained the operating theatres, X-ray department, physio-hydrotherapy section and accommodation for the medical staff. Two double-storied extensions on either side of the central block contained the wards.

=== Hospital ===
The early hospital would take patients up to 14 years old and so the wards were divided into three age groups, 0 to 2, 2 to 9 and lastly 9 until 14 years. The Musicians Ward was the observation ward for those yet undiagnosed. The Sunday Times Ward was the medical and surgical ward with 32 beds for the youngest patients. The middle age group's medical patients were catered for in the Berlein Ward while its surgical patients were placed in the Primary School Ward. The oldest patients were placed in the Red Cross Ward and contained medical and surgical beds.

From 1925, with no space available in the hospital, out-patient services had to be held off-site until a new university lecture theatre was built and the out-patient services returned to the main buildings old lecture rooms. In 1926, the Ross-Rotary (Solarium) Ward was added. By 1933, the hospital had 133 beds but overcrowding occurred in both the in and out-patient areas, casualty and theatres and X-ray areas. New building plans were implemented from 1936. By 1938 new theatres opened and a convalescent home for 25 patients was temporarily opened at the Otto Beit Home. Coming out of the 1936 building plan, were new buildings that were attached to the original hospital block consisting of a multi-storied building with four new wards and more up-to-date equipment and patient rooms. One of the new wards catered for burns and plastic surgery, another for adolescent patients.

After 15 years of planning, from 1965 new building took place. Occupational therapy and physiotherapy departments were first built. An ear, nose and throat ward with a theatre was available in 1966. In 1967, a large casualty complex followed as did a polyclinic, a larger dispensary, administrative offices and record storage, child psychiatry department, social workers and a larger modern X-ray department. Speech therapy and library reading room followed in 1968. In 1974, it could cater for 246 children at a time, but saw 6,000 children in 1973 while 30,176 had attended the hospitals clinics. As of 1974, it was also running the Poison Control Centre. As training hospital, the University of the Witwatersrand supplied student doctors and nurses. The casualty department consisted of nine consulting rooms, two dressing rooms and an emergency room. The hospital also had its own school on the grounds.

=== Staffing ===
From 1923 until 1949, the professional medical doctors were sourced from private practice and would also offer clinical teaching to medical students and paid by the University of Witwatersrand. From 1950 and until 1968, the staffing consisted of part and full-time staff appointed by the Transvaal Provincial Administration in consultation by the University of Witwatersrand. And 1968 saw the recognition by the university of paediatrics as its own School, and more full-time staff followed. Dr E. P. Baumann was its first senior physician and served in the role until 1934. He was followed by Dr B. G. Melle and Dr S. Heymann took over in 1949.

== Current use ==
A new medical school and an academic hospital were planned from 1968 and construction began in 1972 on the Otto Beit grounds in Parktown with a large Paediatric Department to be situated in what was to be called the Johannesburg General Hospital, now known as the Charlotte Maxeke Johannesburg Academic Hospital. By 1978–1979, the Transvaal Memorial Hospital for Children became part of the new hospital. This building is now owned by the Gauteng Department of Infrastructure Development and the Gauteng Department of Health.

In October 2013, the building at the site of Transvaal Memorial Hospital for Children received a blue plaque which acknowledged the historical significance to Johannesburg. The property is now managed by the Children's Memorial Institute with thirty non-governmental organisations that provide services to children.
