= Jardin botanique pyrénéen de Melles =

Botanical garden in Midi-Pyrénées, France

Coordinates: 42.8689°N 0.7592°E

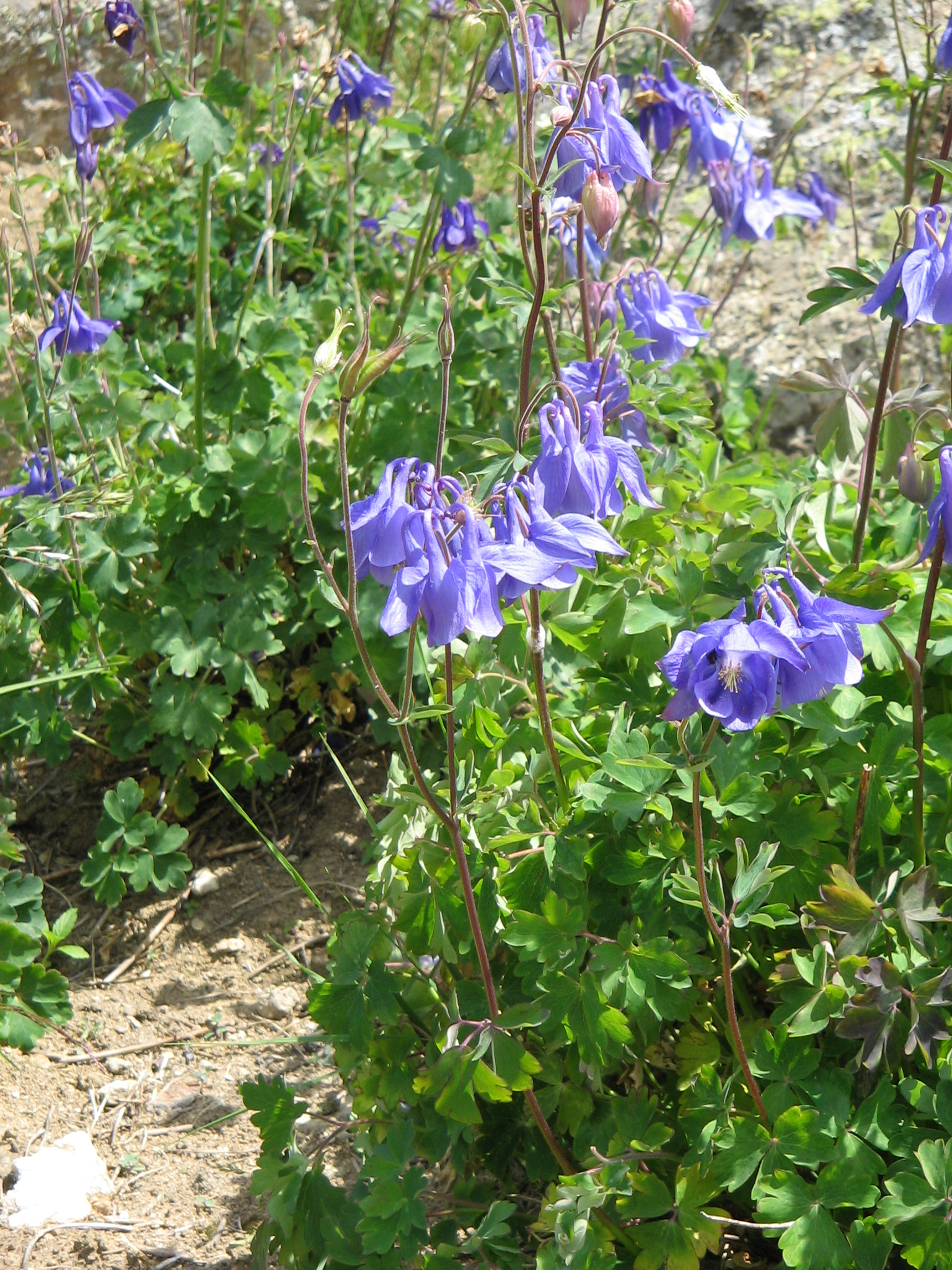
Aquilegia pyrenaica

The Jardin botanique pyrénéen de Melles (3,000 m^{2} or 0.74 acres), also known as A Fleur de Montagne, is a botanical garden specializing in plants of the Pyrenees. It is located in Melles, Haute-Garonne, Midi-Pyrénées, France, and open mornings in the warmer months; an admission fee is charged.

The garden was first envisioned in 2002 by the Relais des Arts Culture et Nature, with a mission to create a botanical garden of plants endemic to the central Pyrenees. By early 2003, about a hundred species had been planted, and in 2005 the garden first opened to the public. Today it contains a number of sections for different environments: sunny, shady, bog, rock, and gravel, with a small stream as well.

== See also ==
- List of botanical gardens in France
