= Tsuruma Central Library =

- 名古屋市鶴舞中央図書館
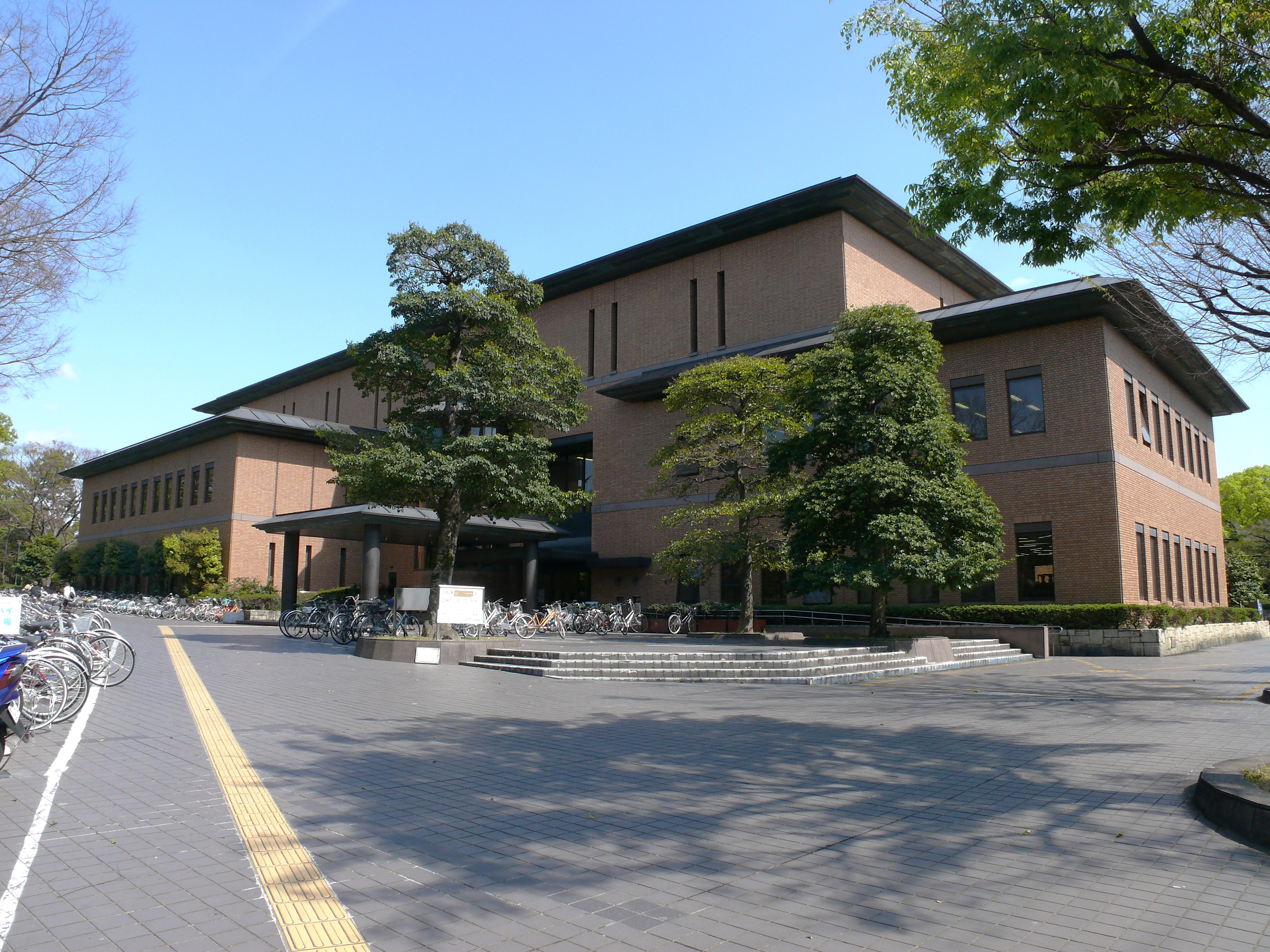
- 35.1545°N 136.917°E
- Location: Shōwa-ku, Nagoya, Japan
- Type: Public library
- Established: October 1, 1923

Collection
- Size: 1.12 m

Other information
- Website: www.library.city.nagoya.jp/guide/m_tsuruma.html (in Japanese)

Tsuruma Central Library (鶴舞中央図書館, tsuruma chūō toshokan) is a public library serving Nagoya, Aichi, Japan.

It is a central library of the Nagoya City Library consisting of 20 buildings. It was established in 1923 but burned down in 1945 in the Second World War and reopened in 1952. It is closed every Monday, unless that Monday is a national holiday, in which case the library is instead closed on the next weekday. It is also closed on every third Friday of the month and for about a week for the Japanese New Year.

It is located in Tsuruma Park, close to Tsurumai Station on the subway and JR rail lines.

== Name ==
Despite being located in an area called Tsurumai, the name of the library and the park that it is located in are named Tsuruma without an "i." This is despite the fact that the place name "Tsurumai" and the library name "Tsuruma" are written the same way in Japanese in kanji.

== See also ==
- Tsurumai Station
