= Buntenkaku =

Coordinates: 35°09′13.2″N 136°55′18.1″E

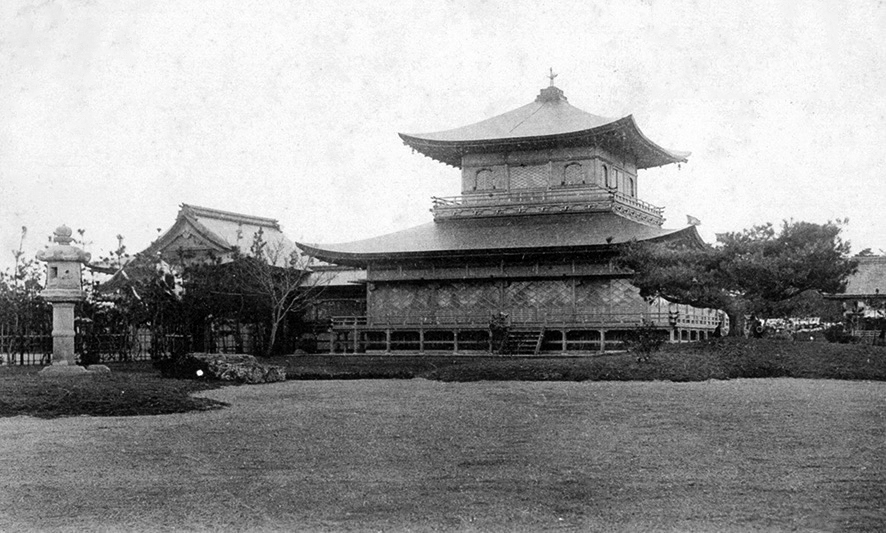
Buntenkaku

Buntenkaku (聞天閣) was a pavilion located in the Tsuruma Park in Nagoya, central Japan. It was located at the southeast corner on an elevation.

It was modeled after the Golden Pavilion of Kinkaku-ji in Kyoto.

It was used to welcome Prince Arthur of Connaught on his visit to Nagoya in 1918. It was destroyed during the bombing of Nagoya in World War II. The spot is now occupied by a sports field.

== See also ==
- Tenrinkaku
