= Tsurumai Station =

Railway and metro station in Nagoya, Japan

T10 Tsurumai Station 鶴舞駅
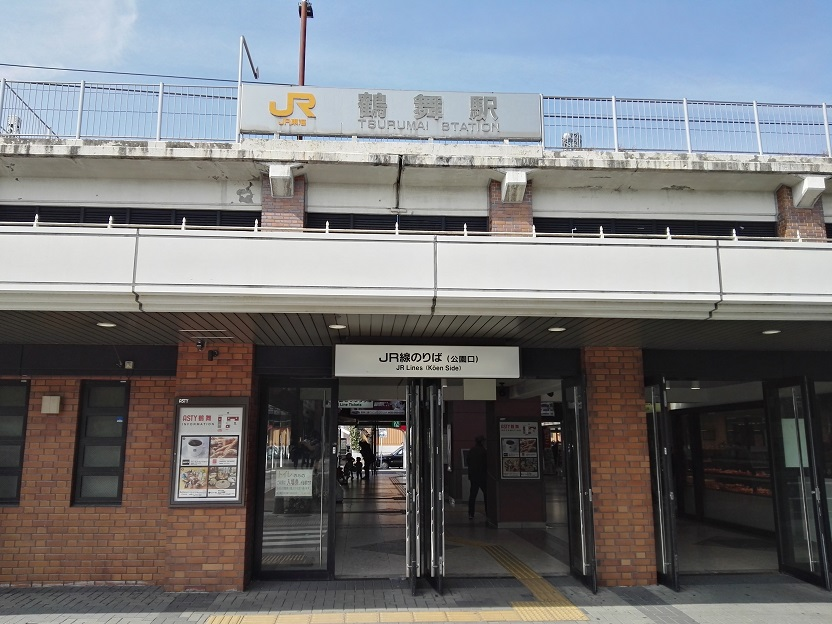
- JR Tsurumai Station exit

General information
- Location: Chiyoda, Naka-ku, Nagoya-shi, Aichi-ken; Japan
- Coordinates: 35.1563896°N 136.917479°E
- System: Nagoya Municipal Subway station JR Central station
- Operator: JR Central; Nagoya City Transportation Bureau
- Line: Tsurumai Line

Services
Preceding station	Nagoya Municipal Subway	Following station
Kamimaezu T09 towards Kami-Otai	Tsurumai Line	Arahata T11 towards Akaike
Location
- Location within Aichi Prefecture Location within Japan

Tsurumai Station (鶴舞駅, Tsurumai-eki) is an interchange railway station in Naka-ku, Nagoya, Aichi Prefecture, Japan, operated by JR Central and the Nagoya City Transportation Bureau.

== Lines ==
The above-ground portion of Tsurumai Station is served by the Chūō Main Line, and is located 391.3 kilometers from the starting point of the line at Tokyo Station and 5.6 kilometers from Nagoya Station. The underground portion of the station is served by the Tsurumai Line of the Nagoya Municipal Subway and is 9.7 kilometers from the starting point of the line (at Kami-Otai Station).

== Layout ==
=== JR Tsurumai Station ===
The JR station has two elevated opposed side platforms with the station building underneath. The station building has automated ticket machines, TOICA ticket vending machines, automated turnstiles, and a staffed ticket office. There are two faregates, one facing Nagoya University Hospital and the other Tsuruma Park. The station features handicapped-accessible bathrooms with a baby-changing areas and rest areas. Outside JR Tsurumai station is a Doutor Coffee shop and various restaurants.

CF02 Tsurumai Station 鶴舞駅

General information
- Location: Chiyoda 5-23-24, Naka-ku, Nagoya-shi, Aichi-ken; Japan
- Operator: JR Central
- Line: Chūō Main Line
- Distance: 391.3 km from Tokyo
- Platforms: 2 side platforms

Other information
- Station code: CF02
- Website: Official website

History
- Opened: 21 April 1937; 89 years ago

Passengers
- 2017: 19,892 daily
Location

==== Platforms ====
1	■ Chūō Main Line	For Kanayama and Nagoya
2	■ Chūō Main Line	For Kōzōji, Tajimi, Nakatsugawa, and Nagano

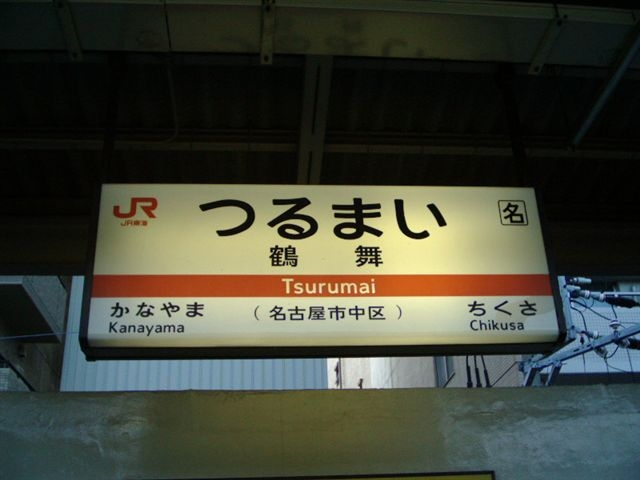
Station Sign

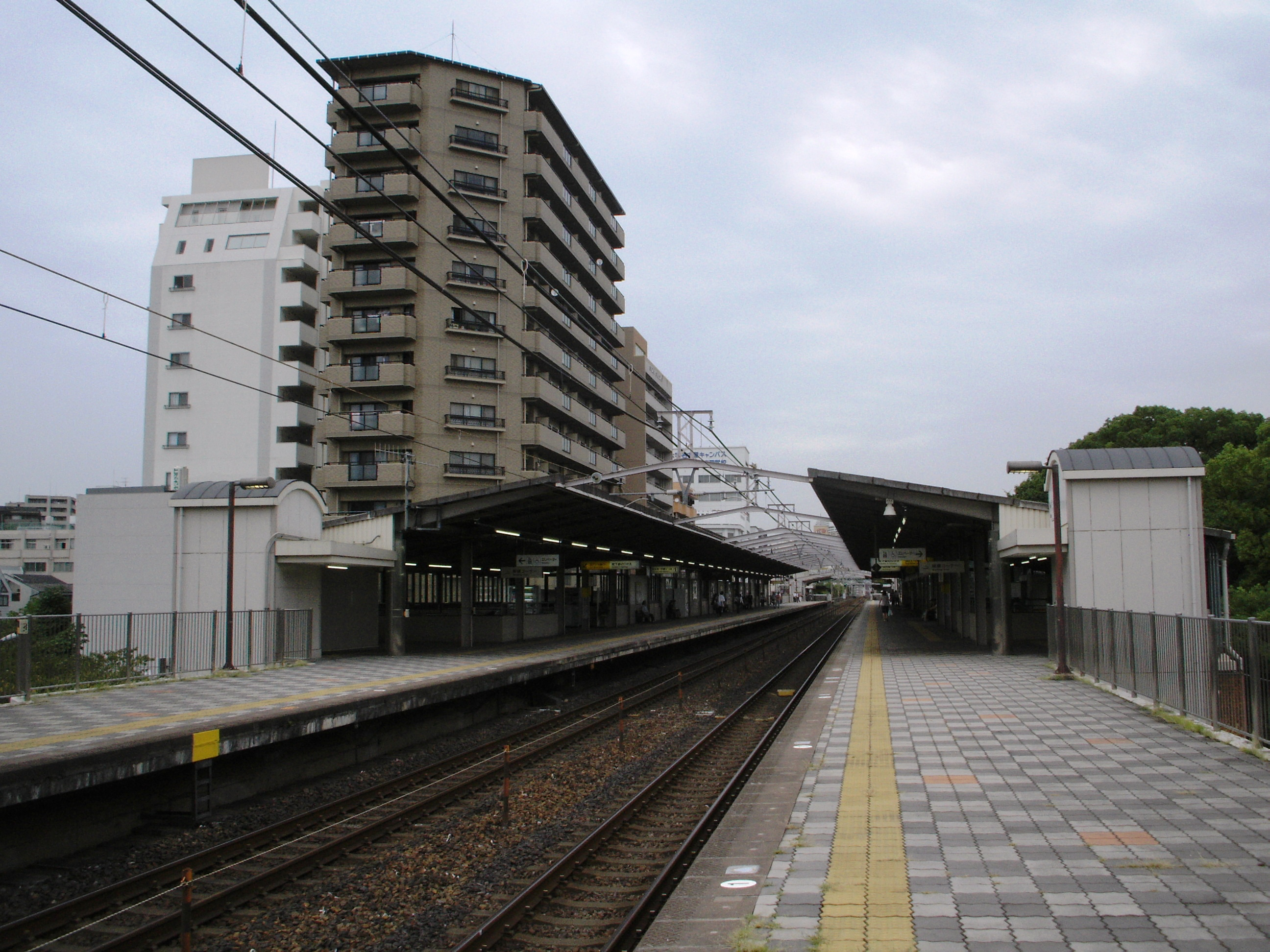
Platforms

Tsurumai Station 鶴舞駅

General information
- Location: Chiyoda 2-15-17, Naka-ku, Nagoya-shi, Aichi-ken; Japan
- System: Nagoya Municipal Subway station
- Operator: Nagoya City Transportation Bureau
- Line: Tsurumai Line
- Platforms: 2 side platforms

Other information
- Station code: T10
- Website: Official website

History
- Opened: March 18, 1977; 49 years ago

Passengers
- FY2017: 14,234 daily

Services
Preceding station	Nagoya Municipal Subway	Following station
Kamimaezu towards Kami-Otai	Tsurumai Line	Arahata towards Akaike
Location

=== Nagoya Municipal Subway Tsurumai Station ===
The underground portion of the station has two opposed side platforms. The station building has automated ticket machines, Manaca ticket vending machines, automated turnstiles, and a staffed ticket office.

==== Platforms ====
1	■ Tsurumai Line	For Yagoto, Akaike, and Toyotashi
2	■ Tsurumai Line	For Kamimaezu, Fushimi, Kami-Otai, and Inuyama

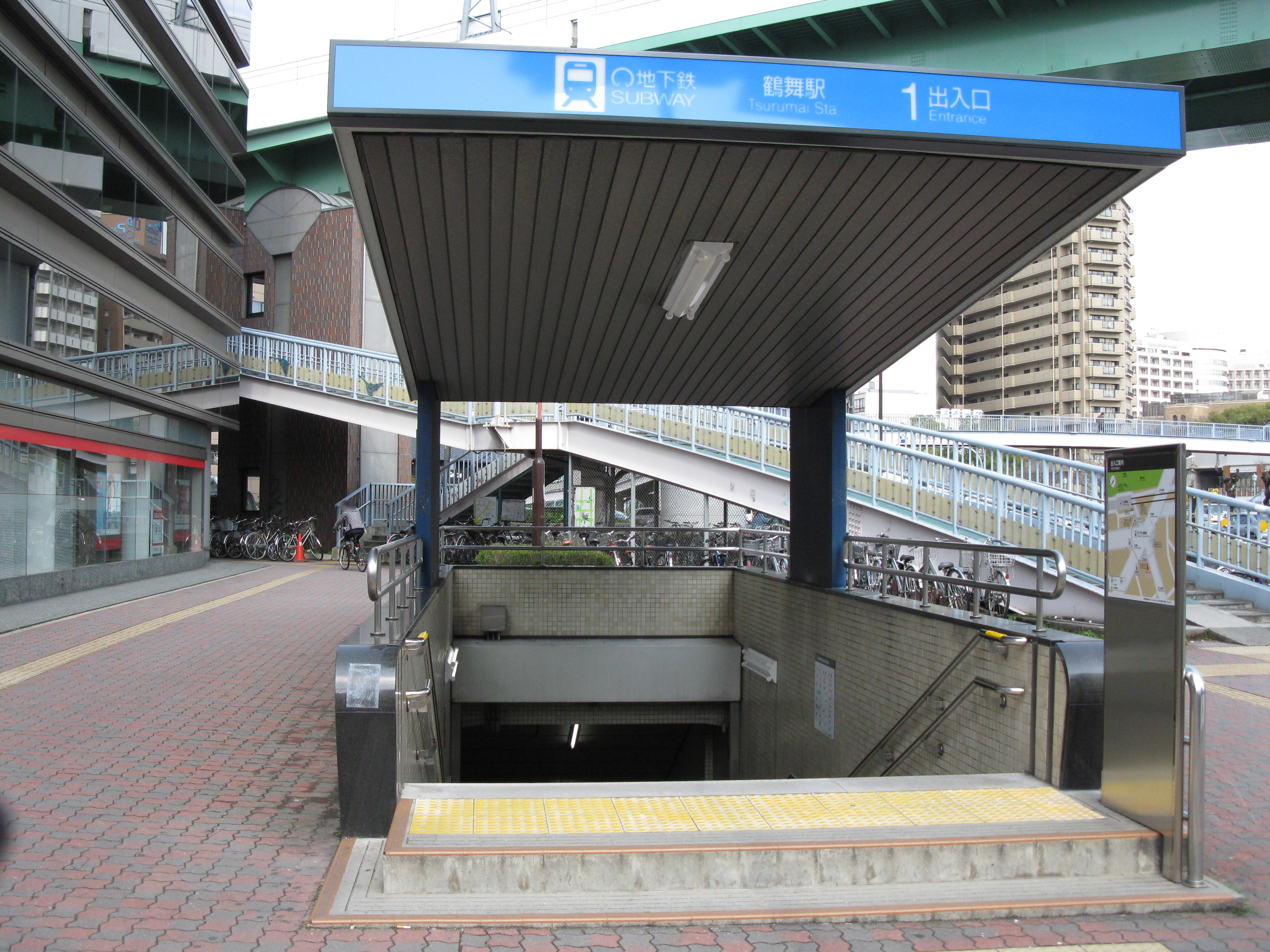
Exit 1

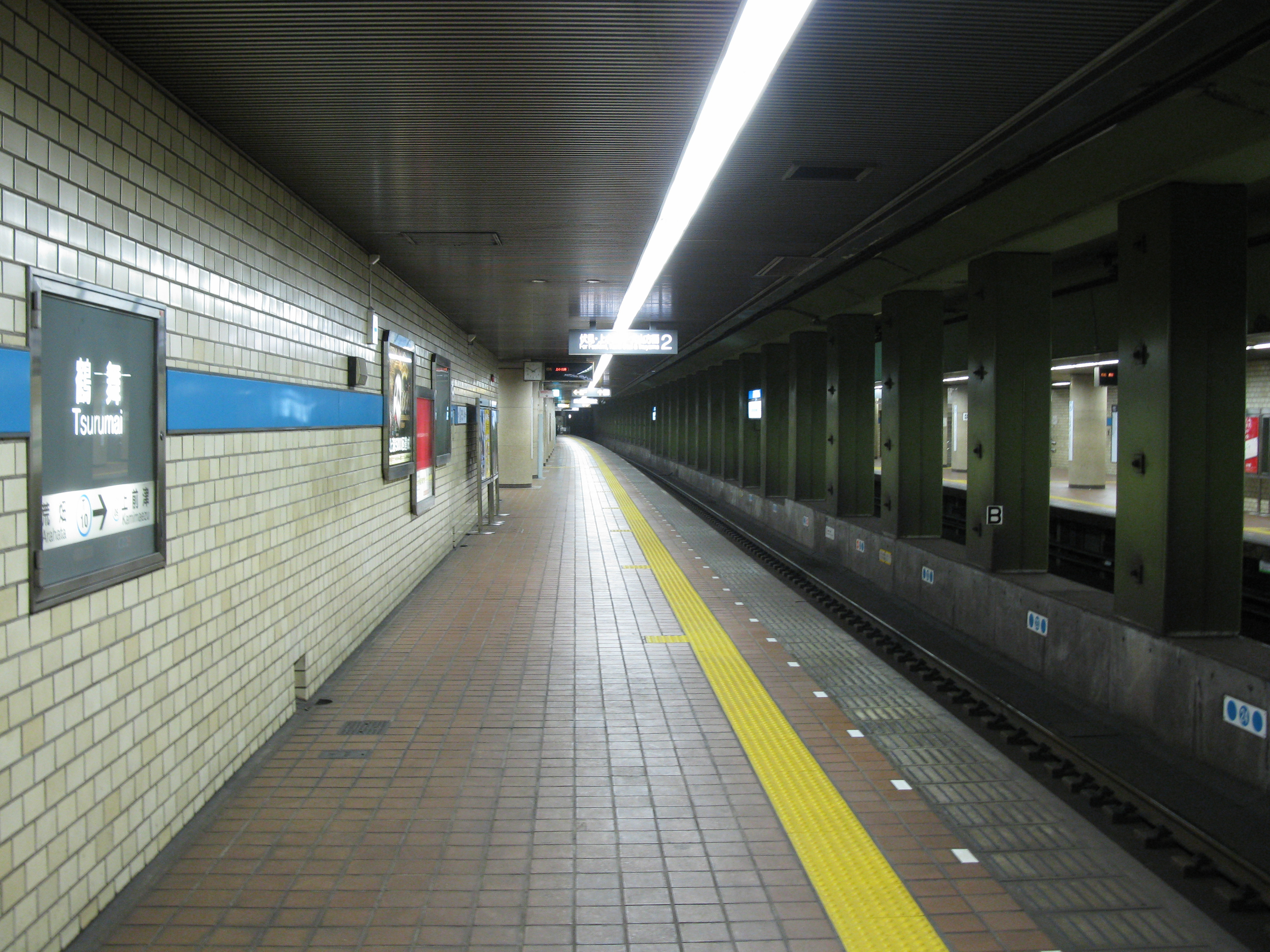
Platforms

== Station history ==
JR Tsurumai Station was opened on April 21, 1937; 89 years ago. The subway portion of the station was opened on March 18, 1977; 49 years ago.

== Adjacent stations ==
«	Service	»	JR Central
Chūō Main Line
Home Liner: Does not stop at this station
Central Liner: Does not stop at this station
Rapid: Does not stop at this station
Chikusa	-	Kanayama	

== Passenger statistics ==
In fiscal year 2017, the JR portion of the station was used by an average of 19,892 passengers daily, and the Nagoya Subway portion of the station by 14,234 passengers daily

== Surrounding area ==
- Tsuruma Central Library
- Tsuruma Park
- Nagoya University Hospital

== See also ==
- List of railway stations in Japan
