= Chubu Walkathon =

The Chubu Walkathon and International Charity Festival is a foreign organized charity event started in 1991 in Nagoya, Japan, by members of the now-defunct American Business Community Nagoya (ABCN); in November 2000 the ABCN merged with and became the Chūbu region chapter of the American Chamber of Commerce Japan (ACCJ).

The event was originally called the Nagoya Walkathon. Held annually on a Sunday in May this event is sponsored by the ACCJ and Nagoya International School (NIS). Its main purpose is to join the international community with Japanese friends and companies in raising money for local orphanages and charities.

== Attendance and donation totals ==
- In 2013 the event was attended by 3500 people who raised a total of 7.7 million yen - 7 million yen for orphanages and local charities and an additional 700,000 Yen for people affected by the 2011 Tōhoku earthquake and tsunami.
- In 2012 the event was attended by 3600 people who raised a total of 9 million yen - 8 million yen for orphanages and local charities and an additional 1 million Yen for people affected by the 2011 Tōhoku earthquake and tsunami. The mayor of Nagoya Takashi Kawamura participated.
- In 2011 the event was attended by 3500 people who raised a total of 12.7 million yen - 7.7 million yen for orphanages and local charities and an additional 5 million Yen for people affected by the 2011 Tōhoku earthquake and tsunami.
- Attendance in 2010 was over 2000 people, and the event raised 6 million yen for orphanages and local charities.
- Attendance in 2009 was up to 2500 people, and the event raised 8 million yen for orphanages and local charities. Nagoya Mayor Takashi Kawamura participated.

== Venues ==
- 2013 - Moricoro Park
- 2012 - Moricoro Park
- 2011 - Moricoro Park
- 2010 - Tsuruma Park
- 2009 - Tsuruma Park
- 2008 - Meijō Park
- 2007 - Meijō Park
- 2006 - Meijō Park
- 2005 - Meijō Park
