= Kamimaezu Station =

Metro station in Nagoya, Japan

Coordinates: 35.1575°N 136.9066°E

M03 T09 Kamimaezu Station 上前津駅
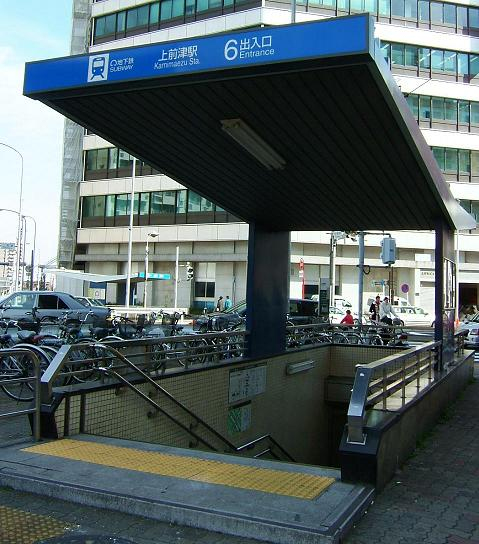
- Kamimaezu Station, 6th Entrance

General information
- Location: Ōsu 4-11-15, Naka, Nagoya, Aichi （名古屋市中区大須四丁目11-15） Japan
- System: Nagoya Municipal Subway station
- Operator: Transportation Bureau City of Nagoya
- Lines: Meijō Line; Tsurumai Line
- Platforms: 4 side platforms on 2 levels
- Connections: Family Mart Convenience Store Vie de France Bakery Yucho (Japan Post) ATM AEON Bank ATM; Kamimaezu Nishi Bus stop

Other information
- Station code: M03; T09

History
- Opened: 30 March 1967; 59 years ago

Passengers
- 2009: 19,658 daily

Services
Preceding station	Nagoya Municipal Subway	Following station
Higashi Betsuin M02 anticlockwise	Meijō Line	Yabachō M04 clockwise
Ōsu Kannon T08 towards Kami-Otai	Tsurumai Line	Tsurumai T10 towards Akaike
Location

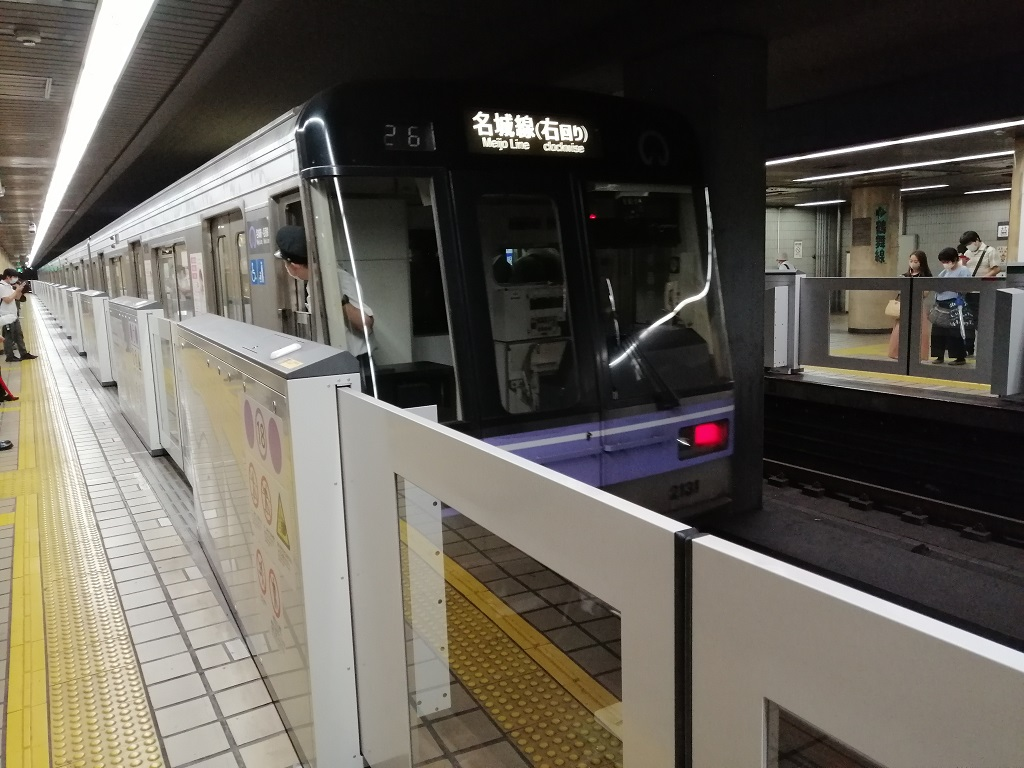
Platform of the Meijō Line (2020)

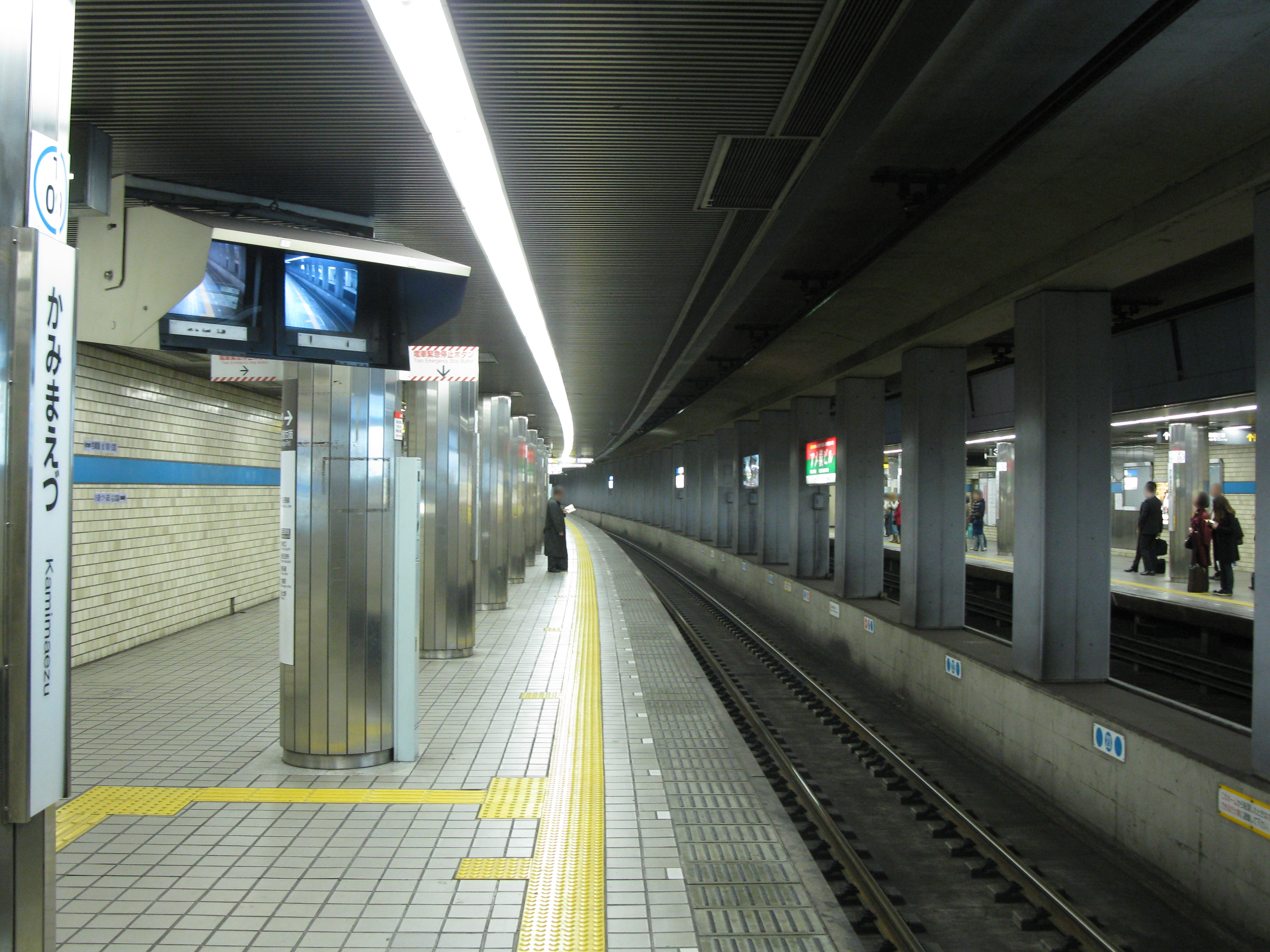
Platform of the Tsurumai Line (2010)

Kamimaezu Station (上前津駅, Kamimaezu-eki) is an underground metro station located in Naka-ku, Nagoya, Aichi Prefecture, Japan operated by the Nagoya Municipal Subway. It is an interchange station between the Tsurumai Line and the Meijō Line, and is located 8.8 rail kilometers from the terminus of the Tsurumai Line at Kami-Otai Station and 1.6 rail kilometers from the terminus of the Meijō Line at Kanayama Station.

The station is located in the south eastern corner of the Osu Shopping Arcade area (大須商店街, Ōsu Shōtengai).

== History ==
Kamemaezu Station was opened on 30 March 1967 as a station on the Meijō Line. The Tsurumai Line connected to the station on 18 March 1977.

== Lines ==
- Nagoya Municipal Subway
  - Tsurumai Line (Station number: T09)
  - Meijō Line (Station number: M03)

== Layout ==
Kamimaezu Station has two pairs of underground opposed side platforms.

=== Platforms ===
1	■ Meijō Line	For Kanayama, Aratamabashi, and Nagoyakō (counterclockwise)
2	■ Meijō Line	For Sakae and Ōzone (clockwise)
3	■ Tsurumai Line	For Akaike and Toyotashi
4	■ Tsurumai Line	For Fushimi, Kami-Otai, and Inuyama
