= Tsuruma Park =

Park in Nagoya, Japan

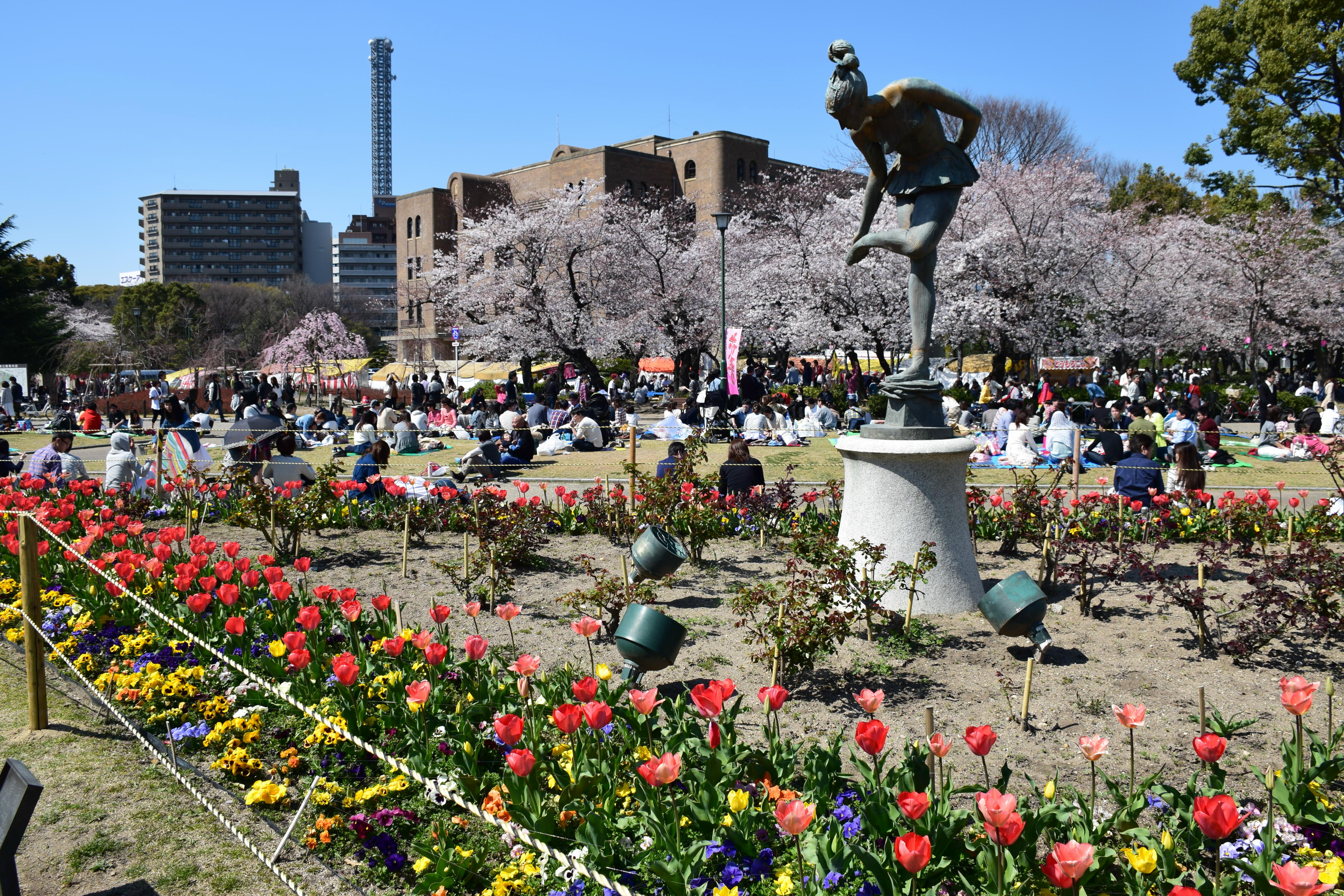
- Flower Festival in spring
- Interactive map of Tsuruma Park
- Location: Shōwa-ku, Nagoya city, Aichi Prefecture, Japan
- Coordinates: 35°08′59″N 136°55′07″E
- Area: 24.07 hectares (59.5 acres)
- Created: 1909

Tsuruma Park (鶴舞公園) is a park located in Shōwa-ku, Nagoya city, Aichi Prefecture, Japan.

== History ==
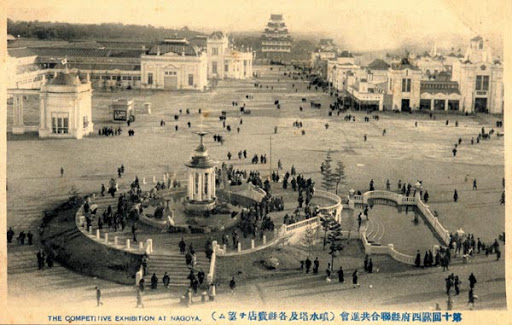
Kansai Area Prefectural Union Joint Exposition (1910)

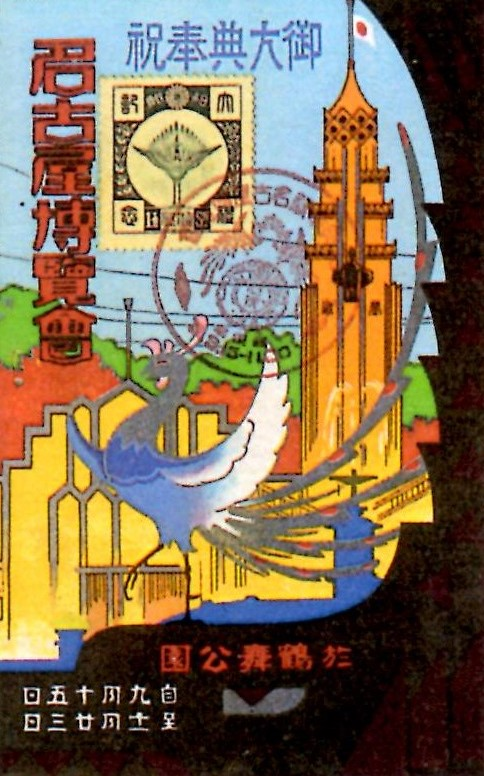
Nagoya Exposition (1928)

The park's history goes back to the year 1909. In 1910, the 10th Kansai Area Prefectural Union Joint Exposition was held at Tsuruma Park.

It features a large water fountain and a gazebo for music bands from the early 20th century, constructed in the European style fashionable at that time.

The fountain tower decorated the venue's main square, and since then has become one of the symbols the park. Engineer Teiji Suzuki designed the tower in a combination of Eastern and Western styles with Roman marble pillars and rock structures. The tower was temporarily removed due to construction on Nagoya Municipal Subway line 3 (Tsurumai Line), but it was restored in 1977. The fountain tower was designated as a Municipal Cultural Property in 1986.

For the exhibition the Buntenkaku was constructed, which was used to welcome Prince Arthur of Connaught on his visit in 1918.

Located within the park is the Tsuruma Central Library.

The park has a Greenification Center that is run by the Nagoya City Greenery Association.

The park has Yoshino cherry, Japanese andromeda, Japanese zelkova, Flowering quince, Tulip, Camellia, Thunberg spirea, Pearlbrush, Rapeseed, Common snapdragon, and Swamp chrysanthemum. Tsuruma Park is popular during the Sakura blossom viewing season in spring, as well as for outings and events such as the Nagoya Walkathon.

Closest access by public transport is the Tsurumai Station by the Tsurumai Line, or with the JR Chuo Line to Tsurumai Station.

With the release of the mobile game Pokémon Go in Japan, the park fountain became known as a "pilgrimage site" among Pokémon fans because it looks like a Poké Ball from above. On July 24, 2016, hundreds of Pokémon Go players, buoyed by false rumours of a Mewtwo appearing in the area, swarmed the park in search of rare Pokémon.

== Gallery ==
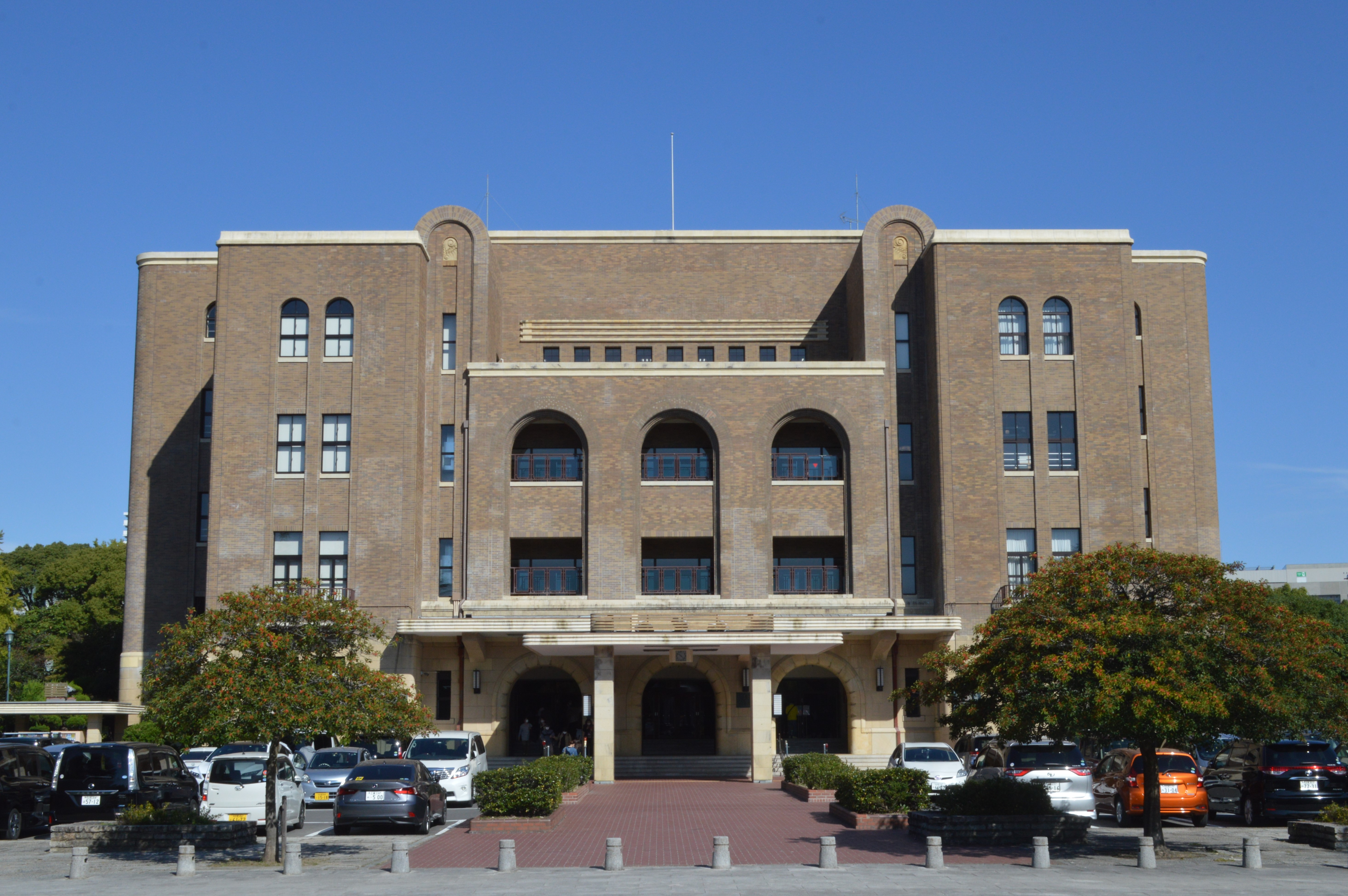
Nagoya Civic Assembly Hall

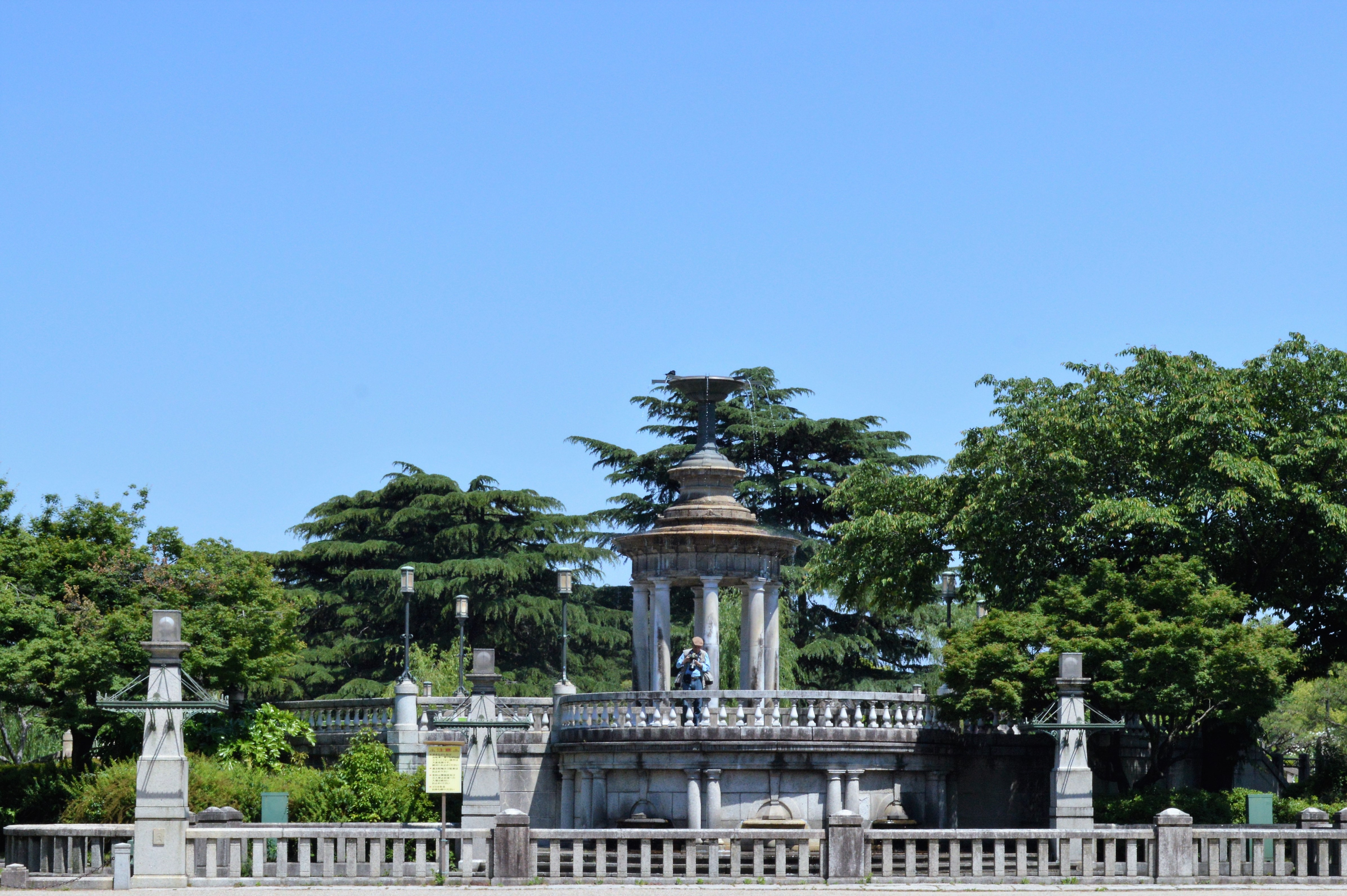
Fountain tower

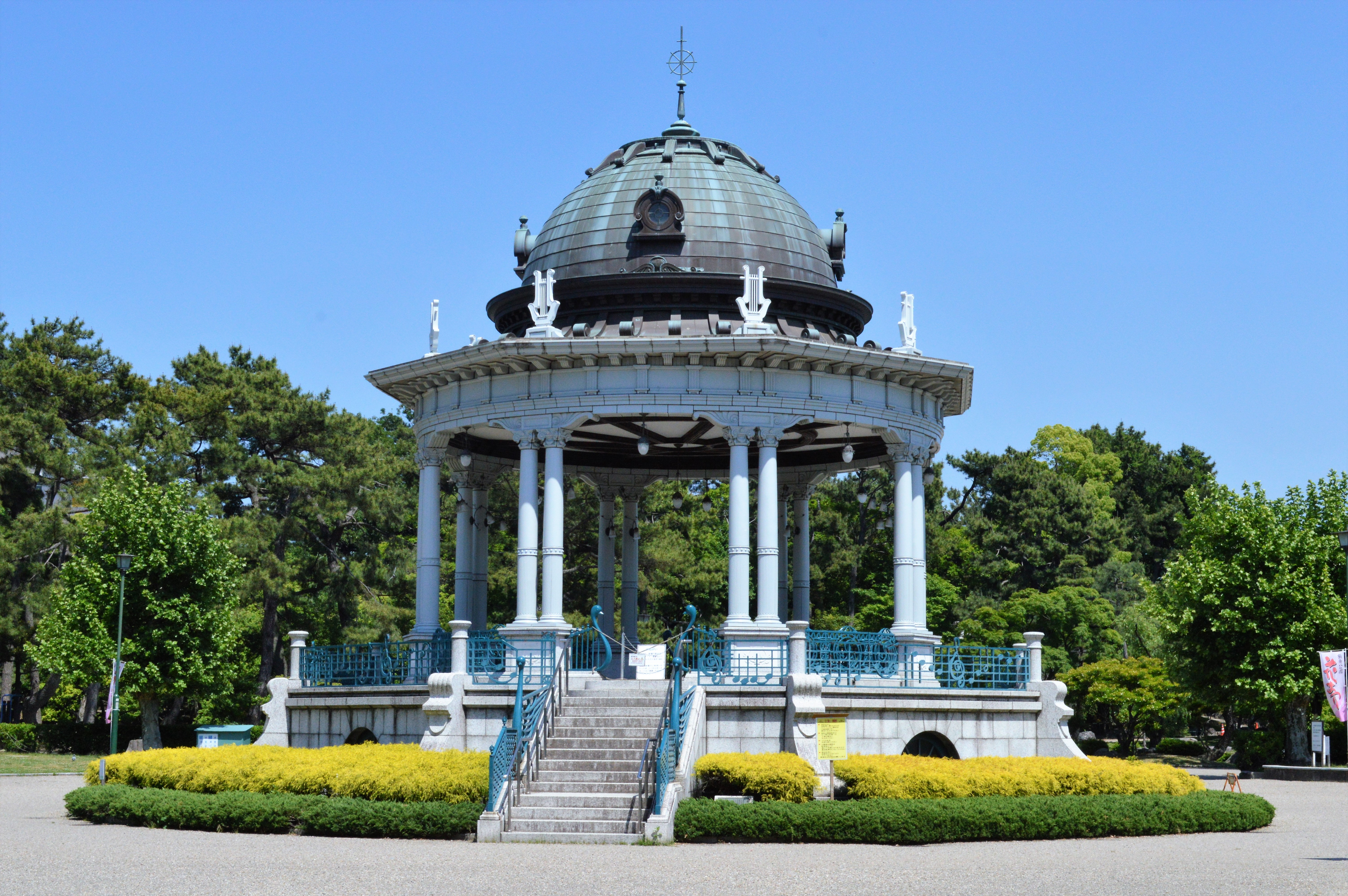
Gazebo

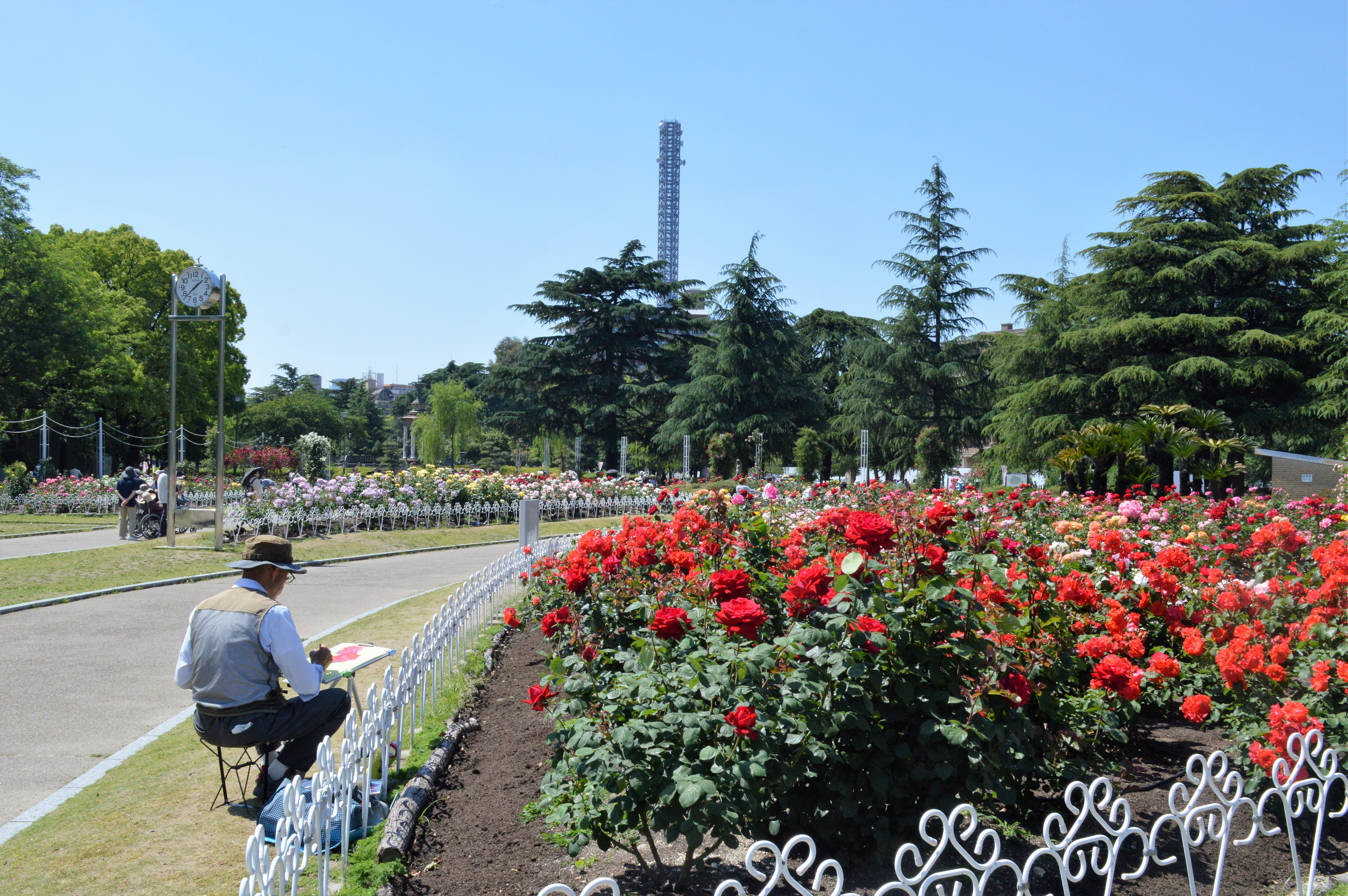
Rose garden

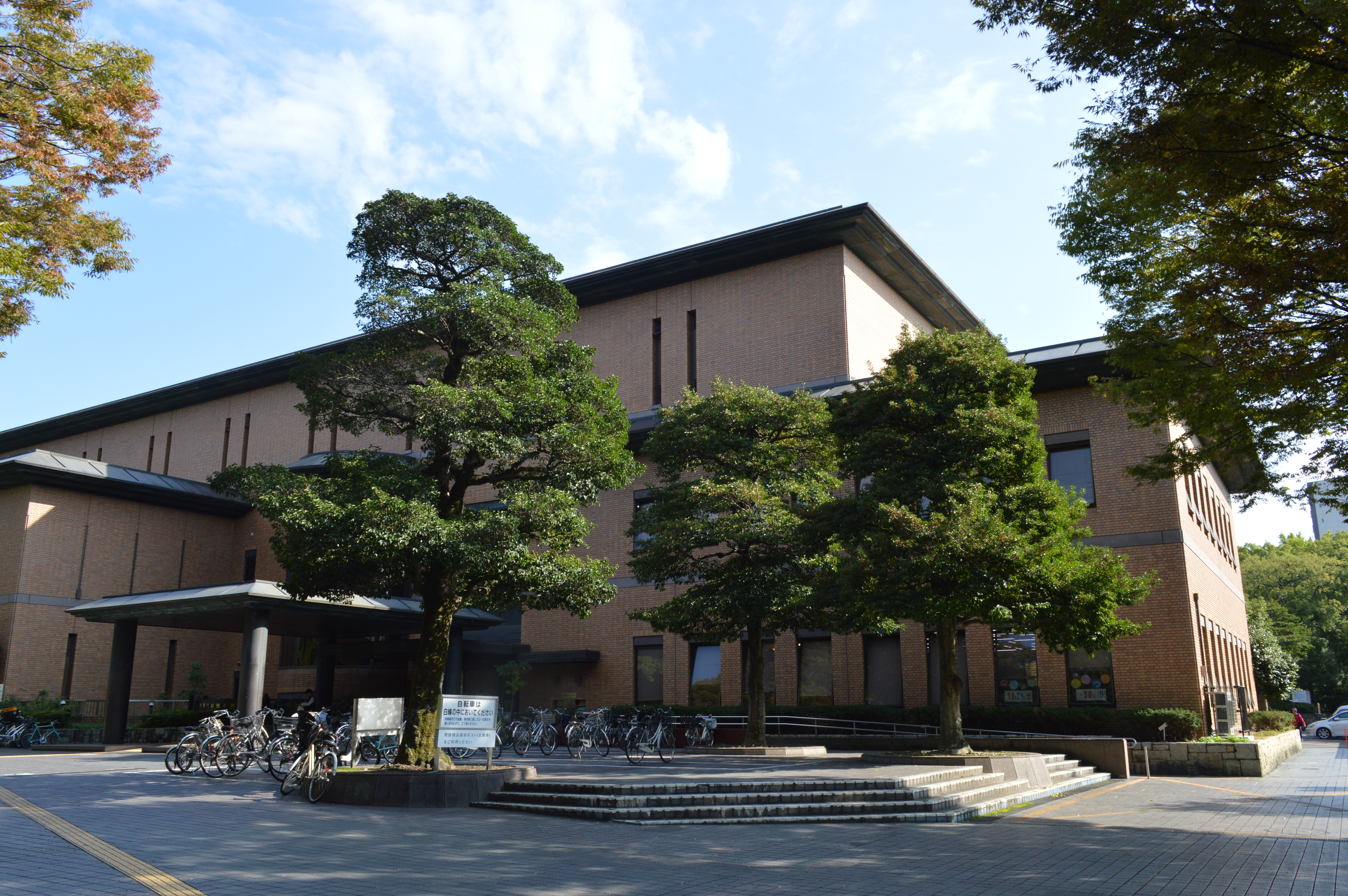
Tsuruma Central Library

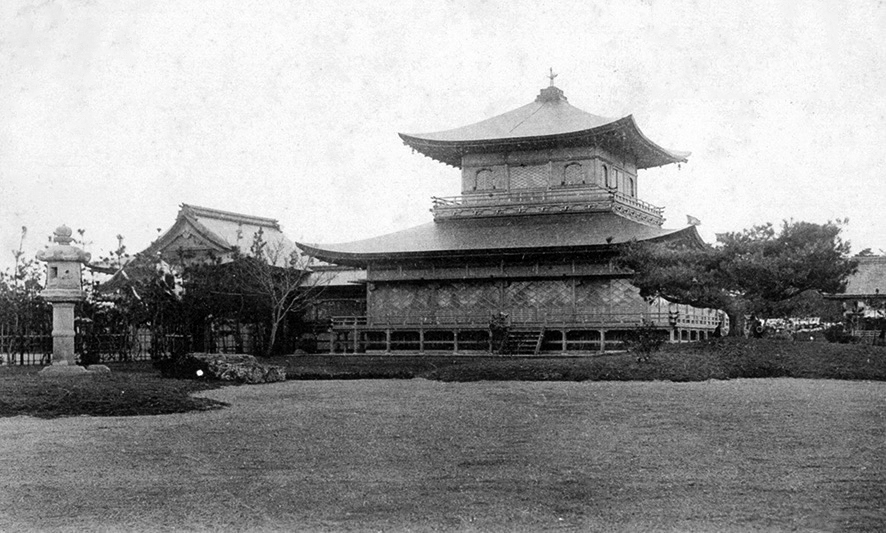
Buntenkaku
