= Melles =

- Commune
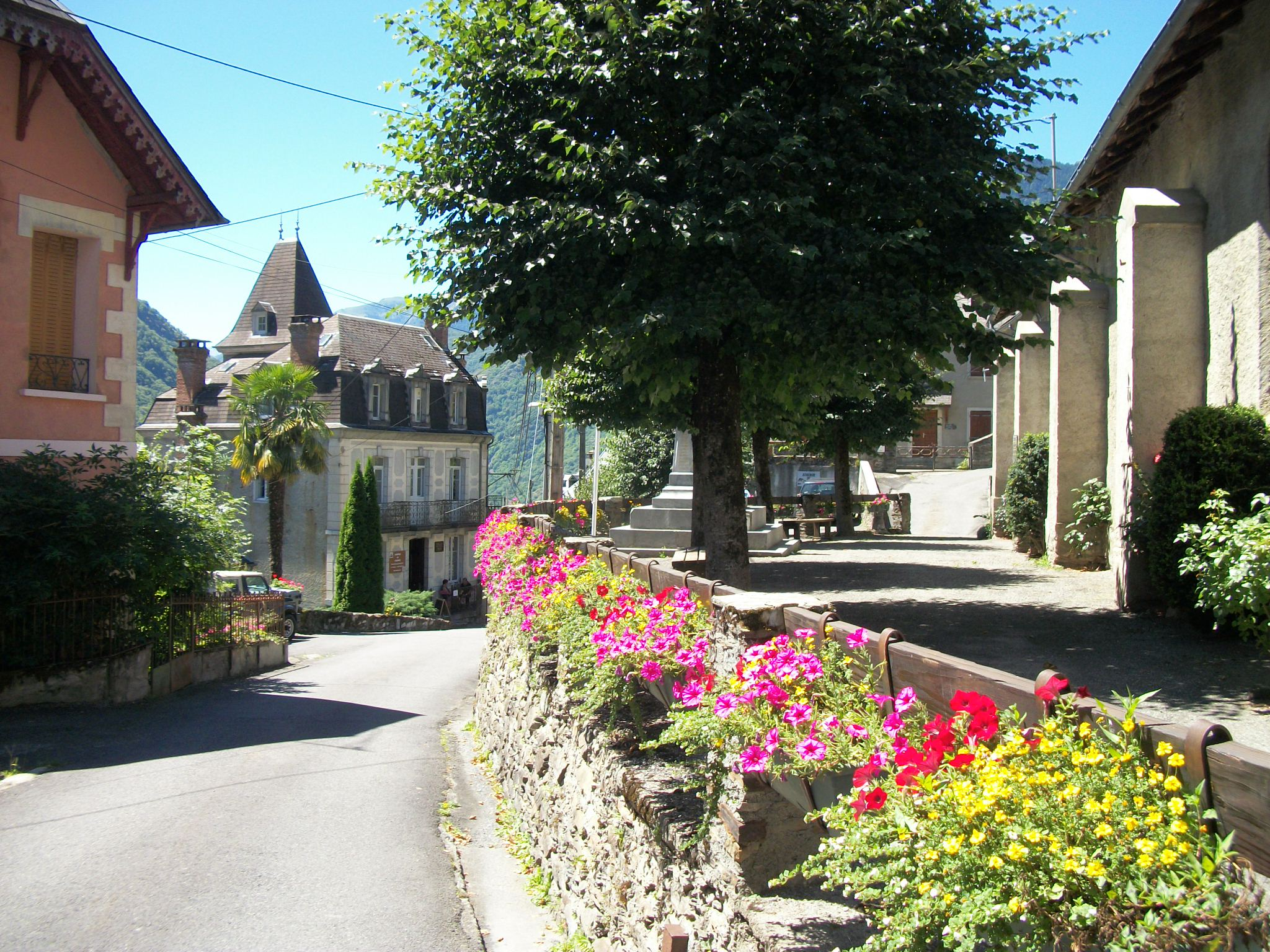
- A view within Melles

- Coat of arms
- Location of Melles
- Location within France Location within Occitanie
- Coordinates: 42°52′08″N 0°45′33″E
- Country: France
- Region: Occitania
- Department: Haute-Garonne
- Arrondissement: Saint-Gaudens
- Canton: Bagnères-de-Luchon
- Intercommunality: Pyrénées Haut Garonnaises

Government
  - Mayor (2020–2026): Alban Dubois
- Area^{1}: 45.32 km^{2} (17.50 sq mi)
- Elevation: 719 m (2,359 ft)
- Highest elevation: 2,626 m (8,615 ft)
- Lowest elevation: 548 m (1,798 ft)
- Population (2023): 95
  - Density: 2.1/km^{2} (5.4/sq mi)
- Time zone: UTC+01:00 (CET)
  - Summer (DST): UTC+02:00 (CEST)
- INSEE/Postal code: 31337 /31440
- ^{1} French Land Register data, which excludes lakes, ponds, glaciers > 1 km^{2} (0.386 sq mi or 247 acres) and river estuaries.

Melles (French pronunciation: [mɛl]; Occitan: Mèles) is a commune in the Haute-Garonne department in southwestern France.

== Population ==
Historical population
Year	Pop.	±% p.a.
1968	183	—
1975	162	−1.73%
1982	115	−4.78%
1990	109	−0.67%
1999	104	−0.52%
2007	107	+0.36%
2012	106	−0.19%
2017	89	−3.44%
2023	95	+1.09%
Source: INSEE

== Sights ==
- Jardin botanique pyrénéen de Melles

== See also ==
- Communes of the Haute-Garonne department
