= Michael Melle =

South African cricketer (1930–2003)

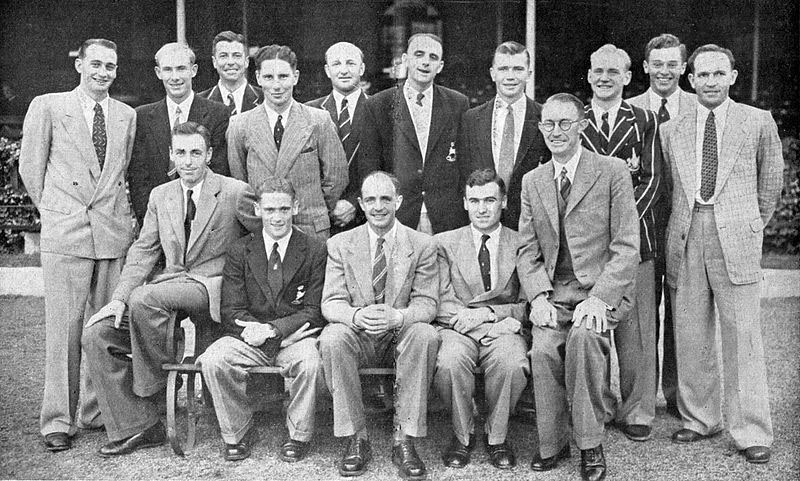
- The South African touring team in 1952–53. Melle is standing second from the right.

Personal information
- Full name: Michael George Melle
- Born: 3 June 1930; Johannesburg, Transvaal, South Africa
- Died: 28 December 2003 (aged 73); Betty's Bay, Western Cape, South Africa
- Batting: Right-handed
- Bowling: Right-arm fast

International information
- National side: South Africa
- Test debut: 10 February 1950 v Australia
- Last Test: 24 January 1953 v Australia

Career statistics
Competition	Test	First-class
Matches	7	52
Runs scored	68	544
Batting average	8.50	11.33
100s/50s	0/0	0/2
Top score	17	59
Balls bowled	1,667	9,590
Wickets	26	160
Bowling average	32.73	24.93
5 wickets in innings	2	6
10 wickets in match	0	2
Best bowling	6/71	9/22
Catches/stumpings	4/–	22/–
- Source: Cricinfo, 15 November 2022

Michael George Melle (3 June 1930 – 28 December 2003) was a South African cricketer who played in seven Test matches from 1950 to 1953.

== Career ==
Born in Johannesburg, Melle was educated at Hilton College in Natal. A "genuinely fast right-arm bowler", he made his first-class debut for Transvaal at the age of 18 against the touring MCC in Johannesburg in 1948–49, opening the bowling and taking one wicket. For his next match, he was selected to play for a South African XI against the touring Australians in 1949–50 and took 4 for 82. After two matches for Transvaal against the Australians he was selected to open the bowling with Cuan McCarthy in the Fourth Test in Johannesburg, having taken just six first-class wickets at 38.33. Still only 19 years old, he took 5 for 113 and 1 for 58 in a drawn match, then 2 for 132 in the Fifth Test in Port Elizabeth, which Australia won by an innings.

He played his first Currie Cup matches the following season, 1950–51. In the first, for Transvaal against Rhodesia in Salisbury, batting at number eight he scored 50, his highest score to date, and took 2 for 13 and 2 for 30 in an innings victory. In his next match, against Griqualand West in Johannesburg in 1950–51 he took 2 for 22 and 8 for 8 (match figures of 24–8–30–10), bowling Griqualand West out for 29 in the second innings. In six matches he took 27 wickets at 14.40 and was selected to tour England in 1951.

Despite missing several weeks of the tour owing to a hernia operation Melle headed the 1951 tour averages with 50 wickets at 20.28. However, he played only the Fifth Test (when he took figures of 10–6–9–4 in the first innings) the tour selectors preferring to use a two-man pace attack of McCarthy and Geoff Chubb for the first four Tests. He took his best innings and match figures for the tour after the Test series had finished: 2 for 22 and 6 for 71 against T.N. Pearce's XI at Scarborough.

Melle's form fell away somewhat in 1951–52 but in six matches he took 17 wickets at 27.35, and as McCarthy was unavailable and Chubb had retired Melle was selected to tour Australasia in 1952–53 as the most experienced of the four pace bowlers in the team. (Of the others, Eddie Fuller and Anton Murray had played no Tests, and John Watkins had played three Tests and taken three wickets.) Melle took seven expensive wickets in the five matches leading up to the First Test against Australia, but then at Brisbane, bowling 46.5 eight-ball overs in the Test, he took 6 for 71 and 3 for 95, he and his opening partner Watkins "maintain[ing] an admirable consistency of length and hostility" in a match that Australia won narrowly. However, he took only five wickets for 365 in the next three Tests and lost his place, despite a remarkable performance against Tasmania in Launceston: 3 for 34 in the first innings and, bowling unchanged in the second innings, 9 for 22.

After two matches in the 1953–54 season, he played no more first-class cricket. He was only 23 when he played his last match, hitting his highest first-class score of 59 and taking 2 for 56 and 3 for 28 to help Western Province to victory against Natal at the end of December 1953.

Melle's father Basil played for Western Province, Oxford University, Hampshire and Transvaal between 1909 and 1923.

== See also ==
- List of South Africa cricketers who have taken five-wicket hauls on Test debut
