= Prince Arthur of Connaught =

British prince (1883–1938)

Prince Arthur
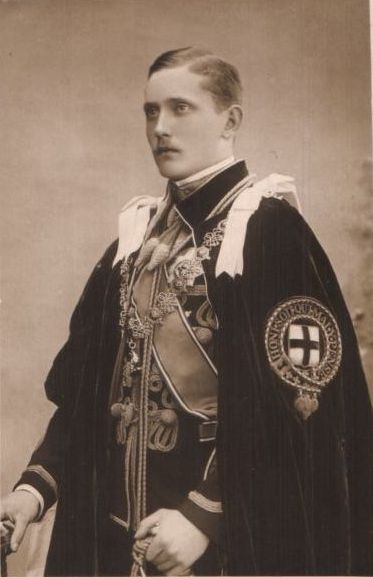
- Arthur in the robes of the Order of the Garter

3rd Governor-General of South Africa
- In office 20 November 1920 – 21 January 1924
- Monarch: George V
- Prime Minister: Jan Smuts
- Preceded by: The Viscount Buxton
- Succeeded by: The Earl of Athlone
- Born: 13 January 1883; Windsor Castle, Berkshire
- Died: 12 September 1938 (aged 55); Belgravia, London, England
- Burial: 22 September 1938; Royal Vault, St George's Chapel, Windsor Castle later Royal Burial Ground, Frogmore
- Spouse: Princess Alexandra, 2nd Duchess of Fife (m. 1913)
- Issue: Alastair Windsor, 2nd Duke of Connaught and Strathearn
Names
- Arthur Frederick Patrick Albert
- House: Saxe-Coburg and Gotha (until 1917); Windsor (from 1917)
- Father: Prince Arthur, Duke of Connaught and Strathearn
- Mother: Princess Louise Margaret of Prussia

Prince Arthur of Connaught (Arthur Frederick Patrick Albert; 13 January 1883 – 12 September 1938) was a British military officer and a grandson of Queen Victoria. He served as Governor-General of the Union of South Africa from 20 November 1920 to 21 January 1924.

== Early life ==
Arthur was born on 13 January 1883 at Windsor Castle. His father was Prince Arthur, Duke of Connaught and Strathearn, third son of Queen Victoria and Prince Albert of Saxe-Coburg and Gotha. His mother was the former Princess Louise Margaret of Prussia.

Arthur was baptised in the Private Chapel of Windsor Castle on 16 February 1883, and his godparents were Queen Victoria (his paternal grandmother), the German Empress (his maternal great-grandaunt, for whom his paternal aunt Princess Beatrice stood proxy), Prince Friedrich Leopold of Prussia (his maternal uncle, who was represented by the German Ambassador Count Münster), Princess Henry of the Netherlands (his maternal aunt, who was represented by Countess Münster), the Duke of Cambridge (his first cousin twice removed), and the Duke of Edinburgh (his paternal uncle, whose brother the Prince of Wales represented him).

=== Succession to the Duchy of Saxe-Coburg and Gotha ===
Arthur's grandfather Albert was the younger brother and heir-presumptive of Ernest II, Duke of Saxe-Coburg and Gotha, who was the sovereign of the small German state of Saxe-Coburg and Gotha. As he had no children of his own, prior to his death in 1893 it had been agreed that Duke Ernst II would be succeeded by his nephew Prince Alfred, Duke of Edinburgh. In 1899 Alfred's only son Alfred, Hereditary Prince of Saxe-Coburg and Gotha died unexpectedly. As the senior Duke Alfred had no other male-line descendants, the next two individuals in line to succeed to the Duchy of Coburg were the Duke of Connaught and Prince Arthur of Connaught.

The Duke of Connaught ultimately elected to renounce both his claim and his son's claim to the Duchy, which resulted in the Duke's young nephew Prince Charles Edward, 2nd Duke of Albany becoming next-in-line. At the time of the Coburg Succession Crisis, both Arthur and his young cousin Charles Edward were students at Eton College. There were reports in the American press that Arthur had physically attacked Charles Edward or threatened to do so if he did not agree to become the heir presumptive to the Duchy of Coburg.

== Military career ==
Arthur was educated at Eton College, but left there early to enter the Royal Military College, Sandhurst at the age of sixteen years and two months. From there he was commissioned two years later into the 7th (Queen's Own) Hussars as a second lieutenant in May 1901. He saw his first active posting the following year. After the end of the Second Boer War in June 1902, most of the British troops left South Africa, but the 7th Hussars were posted there to keep the peace. Arthur and 230 men of his regiment left Southampton in the SS Ortona in October 1902, and arrived at Cape Town later the same month. He spent several months stationed at Krugersdorp. In 1905, he became an aide-de-camp to his uncle, King Edward VII. In 1907, he was promoted to the rank of captain in the 2nd Dragoons (Royal Scots Greys). He became the honorary Colonel-in-Chief of this regiment in 1920.

During the First World War, Arthur served in safe billets as aide-de-camp to Generals Sir John French and Sir Douglas Haig, the successive commanders of the British Expeditionary Force in France and Belgium. He was promoted to lieutenant colonel in 1919. In October 1920, Arthur was promoted to the honorary rank of major general. He became a colonel in the reserves in 1922.

Since the king's children were too young to undertake public duties until after the First World War, Arthur carried out a variety of ceremonial duties at home and overseas. This included opening the 1908 Scottish National Exhibition, which was held in Saughton Park, Edinburgh. One of the attractions was the Senegal Village with its French-speaking Senegalese residents, on show demonstrating their way of life, art and craft while living in beehive huts.

== Marriage ==
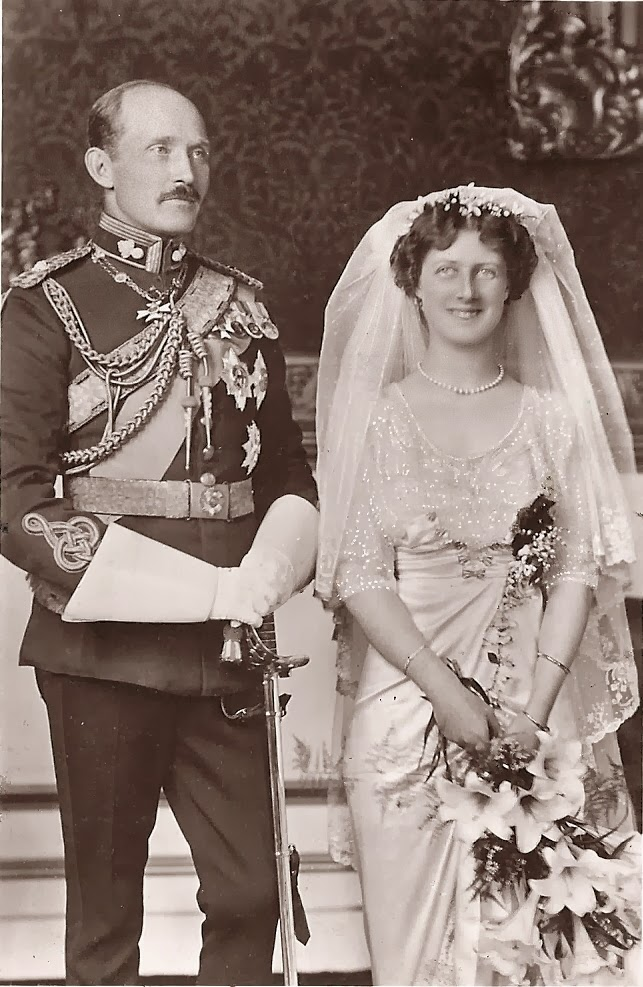
Arthur and Alexandra on their wedding day

On 15 October 1913, Arthur married his first cousin once removed Princess Alexandra, 2nd Duchess of Fife (17 May 1891 – 26 February 1959) at the Chapel Royal, St. James's Palace, London. She was the eldest daughter and heiress of Alexander Duff, 1st Duke of Fife, by his wife Louise, Princess Royal, the eldest daughter of King Edward VII. They had one son Alastair Windsor, 2nd Duke of Connaught and Strathearn.

=== Residences ===
Following their marriage, the couple lived at 54 Mount Street, Mayfair, which Arthur reportedly leased from Robert Windsor-Clive, 1st Earl of Plymouth. They continued to occupy 54 Mount Street until September 1916, when they took a new London Residence at No. 17 Hill Street, Mayfair. By January 1920 they were residing at No. 42 Upper Grosvenor Street, Mayfair. Later in the same year they moved to 41 Belgrave Square, which Arthur had reportedly purchased during the Spring of 1920. 41 Belgrave Square continued to be their London Residence until Arthur's death in 1938; the house was subsequently sold in 1939.

== Later life and death ==
After the accession of his cousin, King George V, Arthur and his father were the most senior adult male members of the royal family to reside in the United Kingdom. As such, he undertook a wide variety of royal duties on behalf of the King. Despite his increasingly prominent role in the royal family, Arthur did not receive any financial provision from the civil list; his grandmother Queen Victoria had privately agreed not to seek state-funded financial provisions for her younger grandchildren during the negotiations leading to the Prince of Wales's Children Act 1889. Despite this, in later life his cousin, Princess Alice, Countess of Athlone (who was also the child of a younger son of Queen Victoria) was granted an annuity of £5,000 from the civil list.

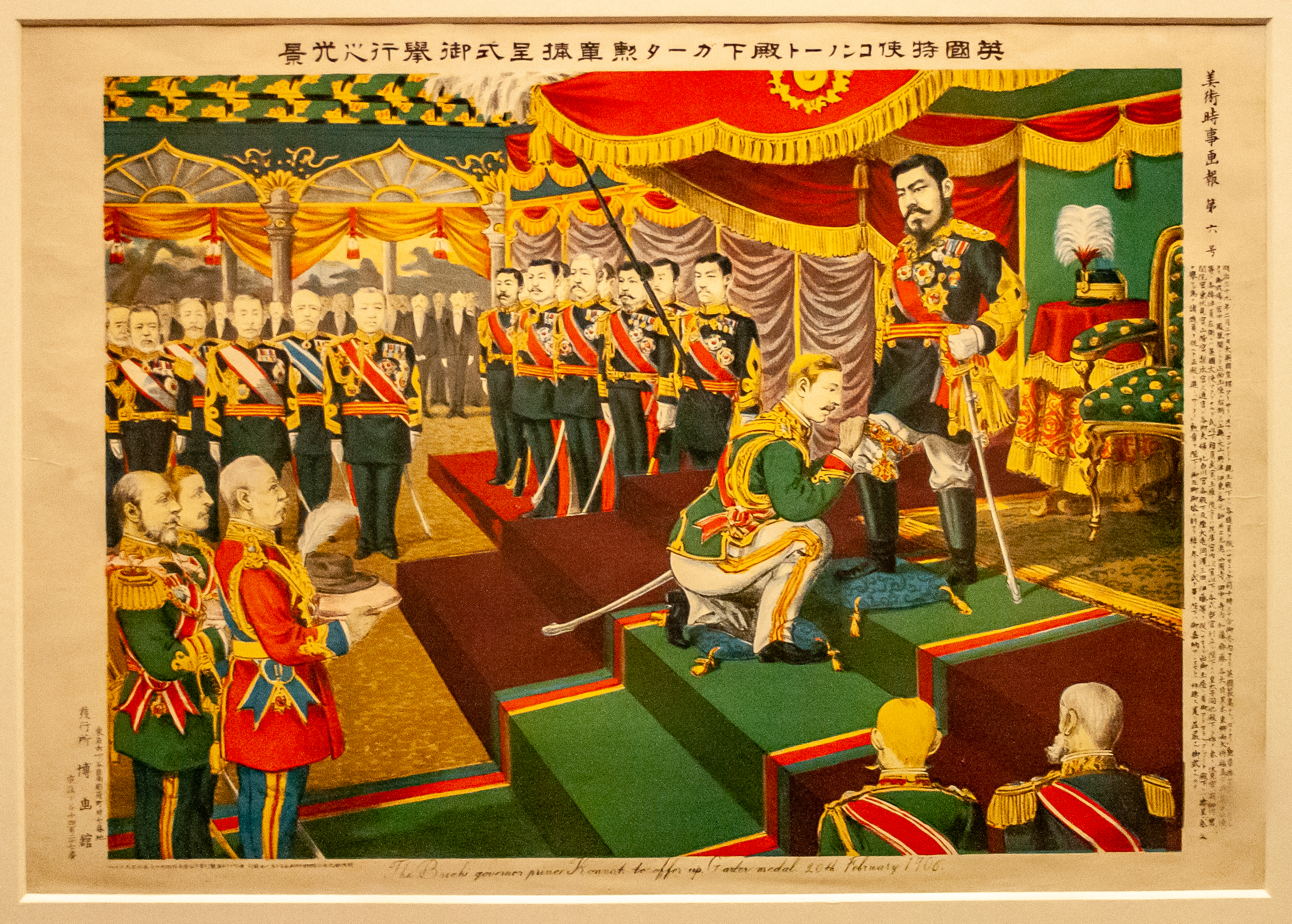
Arthur presenting the Order of the Garter to the Meiji Emperor of Japan

In 1906, by order of the King, Arthur's father invested Emperor Meiji of Japan with the Order of the Garter, as a consequence of the Anglo-Japanese Alliance. Following his mother's death in 1917, he inherited approximately £48,000 from her £123,000 estate. In 1918, he visited Tokyo and then Nagoya and was welcomed at Tsuruma Park and the Buntenkaku, and then travelled on to Kyoto. He left Japan as a guest aboard the Japanese battlecruiser Kirishima as she voyaged from Japan to Canada. In 1920, Arthur succeeded Viscount Buxton as governor-general and commander-in-chief in South Africa. The Earl of Athlone succeeded him in these posts in 1924. Upon returning to Britain, Arthur became involved in a number of charitable organizations, including serving as chairman of the board of directors of Middlesex Hospital. Like his father, the Duke of Connaught, he was active in the Freemasons, becoming Provincial Grand Master for Berkshire in 1924.

In May 1935, he was appointed High Steward (civic) of Reading, Berkshire, a post which had been vacant since 1910. One of his last public appearances was at the coronation of King George VI and Queen Elizabeth in May 1937.

Arthur died of stomach cancer at the age 55 on 12 September 1938 at his London home – 41 Belgrave Square, Belgravia, London. His coffin was subsequently taken to the Middlesex Hospital, where Arthur had been the chairman, and his body lay-in-state in the private chapel, with nurses from the hospital keeping vigil. Following his funeral at St George's Chapel, Windsor, on 16 September 1938, his remains were interred in the Royal Vault, beneath St George's Chapel on 22 September 1938. He was later reburied privately in the Royal Burial Ground, Frogmore. His will was sealed in London in 1939. His estate was valued at £109,418 (or £4.9 million in 2022 when adjusted for inflation). His father, the Duke of Connaught, survived him by four years. Arthur's son, Alastair Windsor, who used the courtesy title Earl of MacDuff after 1917, succeeded his paternal grandfather as 2nd Duke of Connaught and Strathearn and Earl of Sussex in 1942, but died the following year.

== Honours and arms ==
=== Military ranks ===
- 2Lt: 2nd Lieutenant, 7th (Queen's Own) Hussars (8 May 1901)
- Lt: Lieutenant, 7th (Queen's Own) Hussars (14 January 1903)
- Capt: Captain, 2nd Dragoons (The Royal Scots Greys) (27 April 1907)
- Bvt Maj: Brevet Major (14 October 1913)
- Maj: Major, 2nd Dragoons (The Royal Scots Greys) (19 August 1915)
- Bvt LtCol: Brevet Lieutenant-Colonel (3 June 1919)
- Retired from active service (31 December 1919)
- Hon Maj-Gen: Honorary Major-General (27 October 1920)
- Col: Colonel, Reserve of Officers (1 March 1922 to 13 January 1938)

=== Honours ===
Orders and appointments

- KG: Knight Companion of the Garter (15 July 1902)
- KT: Knight of the Thistle (14 October 1913)
- PC: Privy Counsellor (11 June 1910)
- CB: Companion of the Order of the Bath (18 February 1915)
- Recipient of the Royal Victorian Chain (15 May 1906) – for travelling to Japan and investing Emperor Meiji with the Order of the Garter
- GCMG: Knight Grand Cross of the Order of St Michael and St George (3 September 1918)
- GCVO: Knight Grand Cross of the Royal Victorian Order (24 May 1899)
- ADC: Personal aide-de-camp to The King (30 June 1905)
- GCStJ: Bailiff Grand Cross of St John (12 June 1926)
  - KJStJ: Knight of Justice of St John (25 July 1905)
- Knight of St. Hubert (Bavaria) (1911)
- Grand Cordon of the Order of Leopold (Belgium)
- Knight of the Elephant (Denmark) (10 May 1914)
- Grand Cordon of the Order of Muhammad Ali (Egypt)
- Grand Cross of the Légion d'honneur (France)
- Grand Cross of the Order of the Redeemer (Greece)
- Grand Cross of the Ludwig Order (Hesse and by Rhine) (26 September 1901)
- Knight of the Annunciation (Italy) (3 December 1904)
- Grand Cordon of the Order of the Chrysanthemum (Japan) (14 February 1906)
- Grand Cross with Collar of the Order of St. Olav (Norway) (13 November 1906)
- Grand Cross of the Red Eagle (Prussia) (4 February 1901)
- Knight of the Seraphim (Sweden) (14 June 1905)
- Grand Cross of the Order of Carol I (Romania)
- Knight of St. Andrew (Russia)
- Knight 3rd Class with Swords of St. Vladimir (Russia)
- Grand Cross with Collar of the Order of Charles III (Spain) (18 May 1907)

Medals

- 1914 Star (1917)
- British War Medal (1919)
- Victory Medal (1919)
- Queen Victoria Diamond Jubilee Medal (1897)
- King Edward VII Coronation Medal (1902)
- King George V Coronation Medal (1910)
- King George V Silver Jubilee Medal (1935)
- King George VI Coronation Medal (1937)

==== Honorary military appointments ====
- Colonel-in-Chief: The Royal Scots Greys (2nd Dragoons), 8 November 1921
- Colonel-in-Chief: Royal Army Pay Corps, 11 May 1937

=== Arms ===
As a male-line grandchild of a British sovereign, Prince Arthur was awarded, on his twenty-first birthday, the use of the royal arms, with an inescutcheon of the shield of Saxony, and differenced by a label argent, of five points, the outer pair and central point bearing crosses gules, and the inner pair fleur-de-lys azure. In 1917, the inescutcheon was dropped by royal warrant from George V.

Prince Arthur's coat of arms before 1917

Prince Arthur's coat of arms after 1917

Arthur's banner of arms after 1917, a five-point label, the first, third and fifth points charged with the Cross of St. George, the second and fourth points charged with fleurs-de-lis

Arthur's banner of arms prior to 1917 with the coat of arms of the Royal House of Saxony superimposed on it

== Ancestry ==
Ancestors of Prince Arthur of Connaught

8. Ernest I, Duke of Saxe-Coburg and Gotha
4. Prince Albert of Saxe-Coburg and Gotha
9. Princess Louise of Saxe-Gotha-Altenburg
2. Prince Arthur, Duke of Connaught and Strathearn
10. Prince Edward, Duke of Kent and Strathearn
5. Victoria of the United Kingdom
11. Princess Victoria of Saxe-Coburg-Saalfeld
1. Prince Arthur of Connaught
12. Prince Charles of Prussia
6. Prince Frederick Charles of Prussia
13. Princess Marie of Saxe-Weimar-Eisenach
3. Princess Louise Margaret of Prussia
14. Leopold IV, Duke of Anhalt
7. Princess Maria Anna of Anhalt-Dessau
15. Princess Frederica of Prussia

Prince Arthur of Connaught House of Saxe-Coburg and Gotha Cadet branch of the House of Wettin Born: 13 January 1883 Died: 12 September 1938
Government offices
Preceded by The Viscount Buxton	Governor-General of South Africa; 1920–1924	Succeeded by The Earl of Athlone
