= Basil Melle =

South African cricketer (1891–1966)

Personal information
- Full name: Basil George von Brandis Melle
- Born: 31 March 1891; Somerset West, Cape Colony
- Died: 8 January 1966 (aged 74); Johannesburg, Transvaal, South Africa
- Batting: Right-handed
- Bowling: Right-arm medium Leg break
- Relatives: Michael Melle (son)

Domestic team information
- Years: Team
- 1908/09–10/1911: Western Province
- 1913–1914: Oxford University
- 1914–1921: Hampshire
- 1919: Marylebone Cricket Club
- 1923/24: Transvaal

Career statistics
| Competition | First-class |
|---|---|
| Matches | 62 |
| Runs scored | 2,535 |
| Batting average | 27.55 |
| 100s/50s | 3/13 |
| Top score | 145 |
| Balls bowled | 6,252 |
| Wickets | 114 |
| Bowling average | 25.71 |
| 5 wickets in innings | 9 |
| 10 wickets in match | 1 |
| Best bowling | 7/48 |
| Catches/stumpings | 33/– |
- Source: Cricinfo, 28 February 2010

Basil George von Brandis Melle (31 March 1891 — 8 January 1966) was a South African cricketer and paediatrician. He played as a right-handed batsman and bowled right-arm medium pace and later leg breaks. Melle began his first-class career as a batsman, and it was not until he gained a Rhodes Scholarship to the University of Oxford to study medicine that Melle would achieve noterity as a bowler during the 1913 season. Employing fast leg theory bowling, he took 15 wickets at an average of 15.90 during his freshman year. David Frith, the cricket historian, saw Melle as playing a role in the origins of bodyline bowling. A finger injury and outbreak of the First World War disrupted his bowling, and when first-class cricket resumed in 1919, Melle was rarely utilised as a bowler. He graduated from Oxford and returned to South Africa, where he became a prominent paediatrician.

== Early life and cricket ==
Melle was born in Somerset West in March 1891. He was educated in Cape Town at the South African College School, where he excelled in physics and mathematics. At school, he was a member of the Students' Christian Association. He made his debut in first-class cricket for Western Province against Eastern Province at Newlands in the 1908–09 Currie Cup, with Melle making a further appearance in the competition against Transvaal. A hiatus of eighteen months followed before he next played first-class cricket, with Melle making nine further first-class appearances in 1909 and 1910, which included six appearances in the 1910–11 Currie Cup; the 1910–11 season bought him considerable success with the bat, with scoring 413 runs at an average of 34.41. He made his maiden century (145 runs) against Griqualand West during the season.

== Rhodes Scholarship to Oxford ==
Melle gained a Rhodes Scholarship to the University of Oxford in England in 1912, where he studied medicine at Brasenose College. During his freshman year he began playing first-class cricket for Oxford University Cricket Club, for whom he debuted for against Harry Foster's personal team at Oxford. He played nine matches for Oxford in 1913, scoring 278 runs at an average of 18.53. However, it was as a medium pace bowler that Melle impressed during his freshman year. In South Africa, Melle had seldom bowled in first-class cricket, but for Oxford he became an early proponent of fast leg theory bowling through his 'inswingers with three short-legs'. Across the season, he took 55 wickets at a bowling average of 15.90, claiming five wickets in an innings on six occasions; that season he topped the Oxford bowling averages, with Murray et al. speculating that his seasonal return may have been even more impressive, had the close-in fieldsmen upon which his bowling relied been better versed at close-in catching, then also in its infancy. In the 1913 University Match against Cambridge University at Lord's, the Cambridge batsmen were unable to cope with his bowling, with Melle taking 6 for 70 in the Cambridge first innings; by playing in The University Match, Melle became the first South African-educated cricketer to earn a blue.

He played for Oxford in 1914, making six appearances, including a second appearance in The University Match. A broken finger soon after the start of the season, which led to a decline in his bowling once recovered, a decline which was said to have "crippled the [Oxford] side", which had been so reliant on his bowling the season before. During the season, he ended up taking 19 wickets for Oxford. Unbeknownst to Melle, this would be his final season playing for Oxford due to the outbreak of the First World War. In his two season's playing for Oxford, he made fifteen appearances in which he scored 497 runs at an average of 20.70, whilst with the ball he took 74 wickets at an average of 20.04. Shortly before first-class cricket was suspended due to the war, Melle made three appearances for Hampshire in the County Championship in July and August. In the last of these three, against Nottinghamshire at Trent Bridge, he had bowled six overs when he received a telegram calling him for military service with the Oxford University Contingent of the King's Colonial Corps, two days after war had been declared on Germany.

== War service and post-war cricket ==
Serving in the war, Melle was appointed a temporary second lieutenant in the Royal Artillery in December 1914. He was made a temporary lieutenant in April 1915, and a temporary captain in December 1915. He was appointed an adjutant in March 1917, but five months later he resigned his commission in order to resume his medical studies at Oxford, being granted the honorary rank of captain. Resuming his studies at Oxford, he achieved his MB in 1919 and proceeded to train at St Bartholomew's Hospital Medical College.

Following the end of the war in November 1918, first-class cricket began again in 1919. He made fourteen appearances in the 1919 County Championship for Hampshire, with Melle making addition first-class appearances in 1919 for the Free Foresters against Oxford University, and played twice for the Marylebone Cricket Club against both Oxford and Cambridge Universities. As a batsman, he passed a thousand runs for the season for the only time in 1919, with 1,021 at an average of 35.20; he made two centuries, including 110 runs against Gloucestershire at Bristol, with his batting endeavours that season placing him third in the Hampshire batting averages. By this stage of his career, his bowling had declined to such an extent that it was rarely used by Hampshire, however, he still took 22 wickets in 1919, at an average of 34.81. He continued to play for Hampshire in both 1920 and 1921, making six appearances in the 1920 County Championship, but played just twice in 1921. In 27 first-class matches for Hampshire, he scored 1,207 runs at an average of 29.43, whilst with the ball he took 25 wickets at an average of 42.96. It was reported in the Portsmouth Evening News that his "professional and scholastic duties" would prevent him playing for Hampshire in 1922.

== Return to South Africa ==
After completing his training at St Bartholomew's, Melle returned to South Africa. There he was a physician at the newly established Transvaal Memorial Hospital for Children. He was later a founding member of the South African Paediatric Association in the 1940s, serving as its first chairman. During the 1930s, he was a lecturer in paediatics at the University of the Witwatersrand, with him later becoming a senior lecturer. During the latter part of his medical career, he did not retire completely from practice, but instead maintained a private practice.

Upon his return to South Africa, Melle remained active in first-class cricket. He captained Transvaal to the 1923–24 Currie Cup title, making five appearances, plus one further first-class appearance in a non-Currie Cup match. In these, he scored 161 runs and took eight wickets, five of which came in a single innings (5 for 47) against Natal in the non-Currie Cup fixture at These appearances concluded his first-class career, with Melle having made 65 appearances. He scored 2,535 runs at an average 27.55, having made three centuries and thirteen half centuries. With the ball, he took 114 wickets at an average of 25.71, having taken nine five wicket hauls. The cricket historian David Frith considers Melle as having played a role in the origins of fast leg theory bowling, which would later gain great prominence during the 1932–33 Ashes series in Australia. Melle would spend 42-years on the committee of the Wanderers Club, and would assist the club as its vice-chairman.

Melle died in Johannesburg in January 1966; his son, Michael, played Test cricket for South Africa.

== Works cite ==
- Paton, Alan (1964). Hofmeyr. Oxford University Press.
