= Asahi-mae Station =

Railway station in Owariasahi, Aichi Prefecture, Japan

Asahi-mae Station 旭前駅

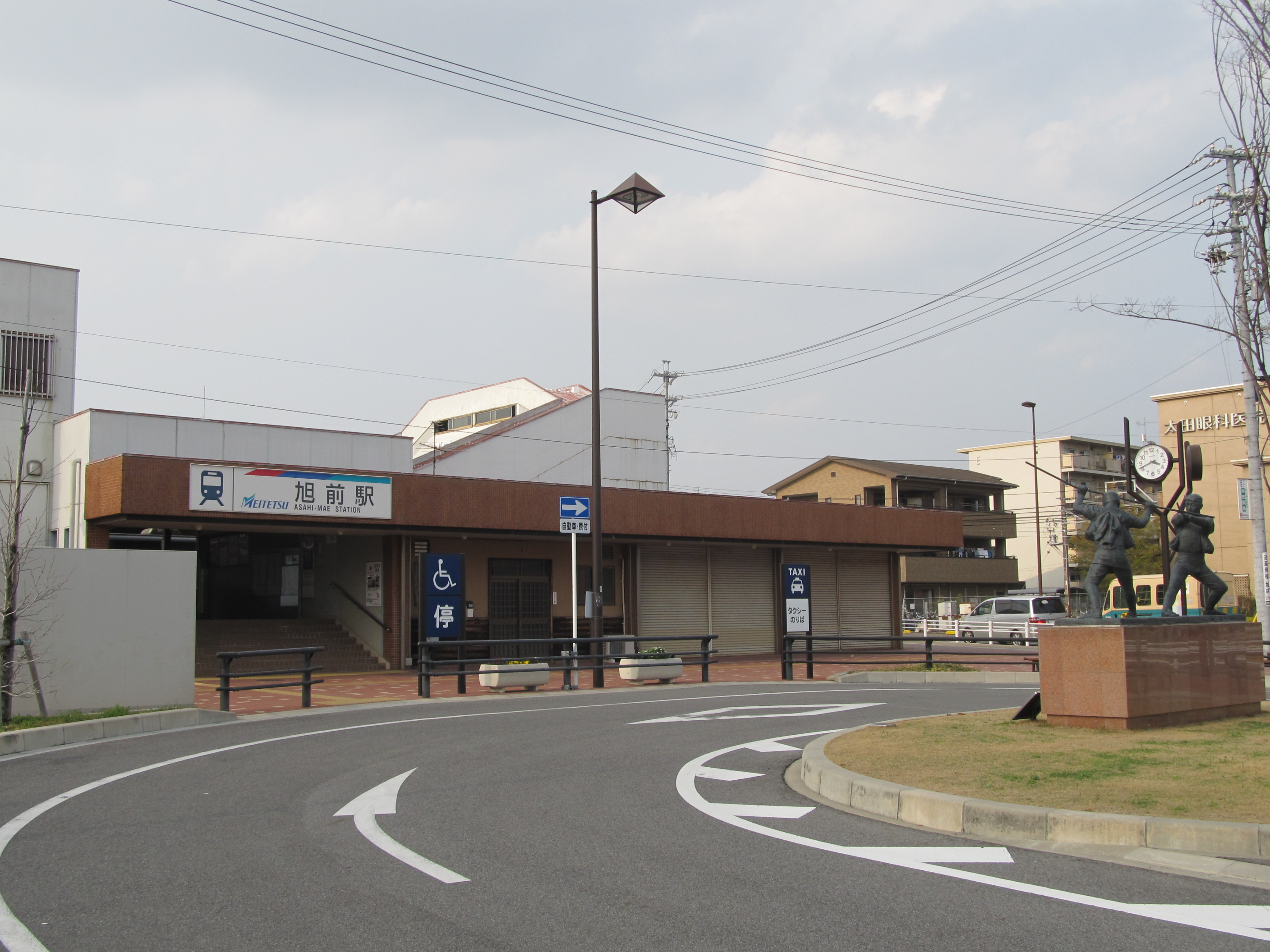
- Asahi-mae Station

General information
- Location: 5-chōme-4-5 Asahimaechō, Owariasahi-shi, Aichi-ken 488-0855; Japan
- Coordinates: 35.2140°N 137.0198°E
- Operator: Meitetsu
- Line: ■ Meitetsu Seto Line
- Distance: 13.1 kilometers from Sakaemachi
- Platforms: 2 side platforms

Other information
- Status: Unstaffed
- Station code: ST14
- Website: Official website

History
- Opened: April 2, 1905
- Former names: Tsunboishi (聾石) (until 1942)

Passengers
- FY2017: 6,016

Services
Preceding station	Meitetsu	Following station
Inba towards Sakaemachi	Seto Line Local	Owari Asahi towards Owari Seto
Inba towards Sakaemachi	Seto Line Semi Express	Owari Asahi towards Owari Seto
Location
- Location within Aichi Prefecture Location within Japan

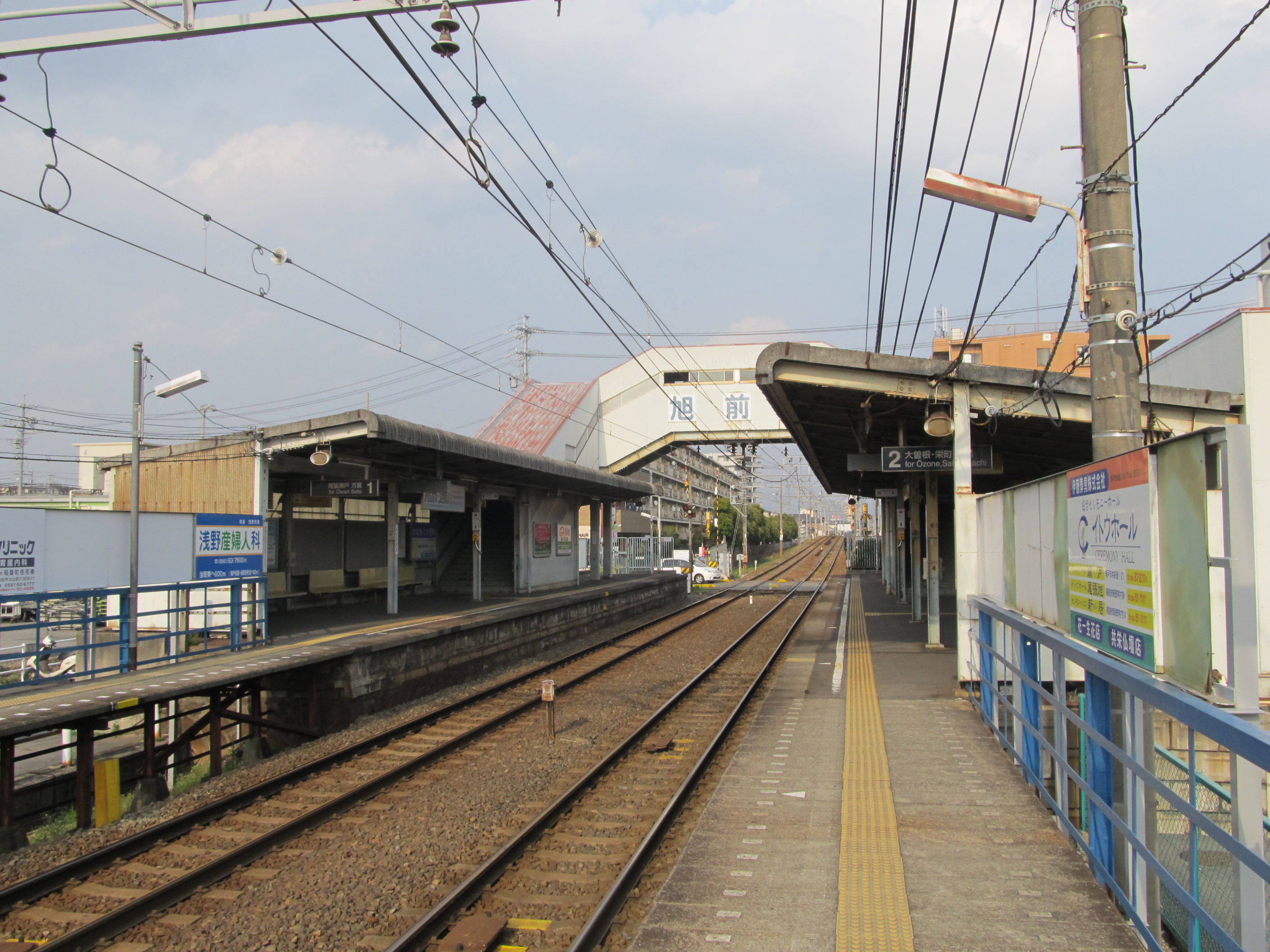
Platforms

Asahi-mae Station (旭前駅, Asahi-mae-eki) is a railway station in the city of Owariasahi, Aichi Prefecture, Japan, operated by Meitetsu.

== Lines ==
Asahi-mae Station is served by the Meitetsu Seto Line, and is located 13.1 kilometers from the starting point of the line at Sakaemachi.

== Station layout ==
The station has two opposed side platforms connected by a footbridge. The station has automated ticket machines, Manaca automated turnstiles and is unattended.

=== Platforms ===
1	■ Meitetsu Seto Line	For Owari Seto
2	■ Meitetsu Seto Line	For Ōzone and Sakaemachi

== Station history ==
Asahi-mae Station was opened on April 2, 1905, as Tsunboishi Station (聾石) on the privately operated Seto Electric Railway. The Seto Electric Railway was absorbed into the Meitetsu group on September 1, 1939. The station was renamed to its present name in 1942. A new station building was completed in April 1985. The station has been unattended since 2006.

== Passenger statistics ==
In fiscal 2017, the station was used by an average of 6,016 passengers daily.

== Surrounding area ==
- Asahino High School
- Asahi-Seiki Manufacturing.

== See also ==
- List of railway stations in Japan
