= Inba Station =

Railway station in Owariasahi, Aichi Prefecture, Japan

Inba Station 印場駅

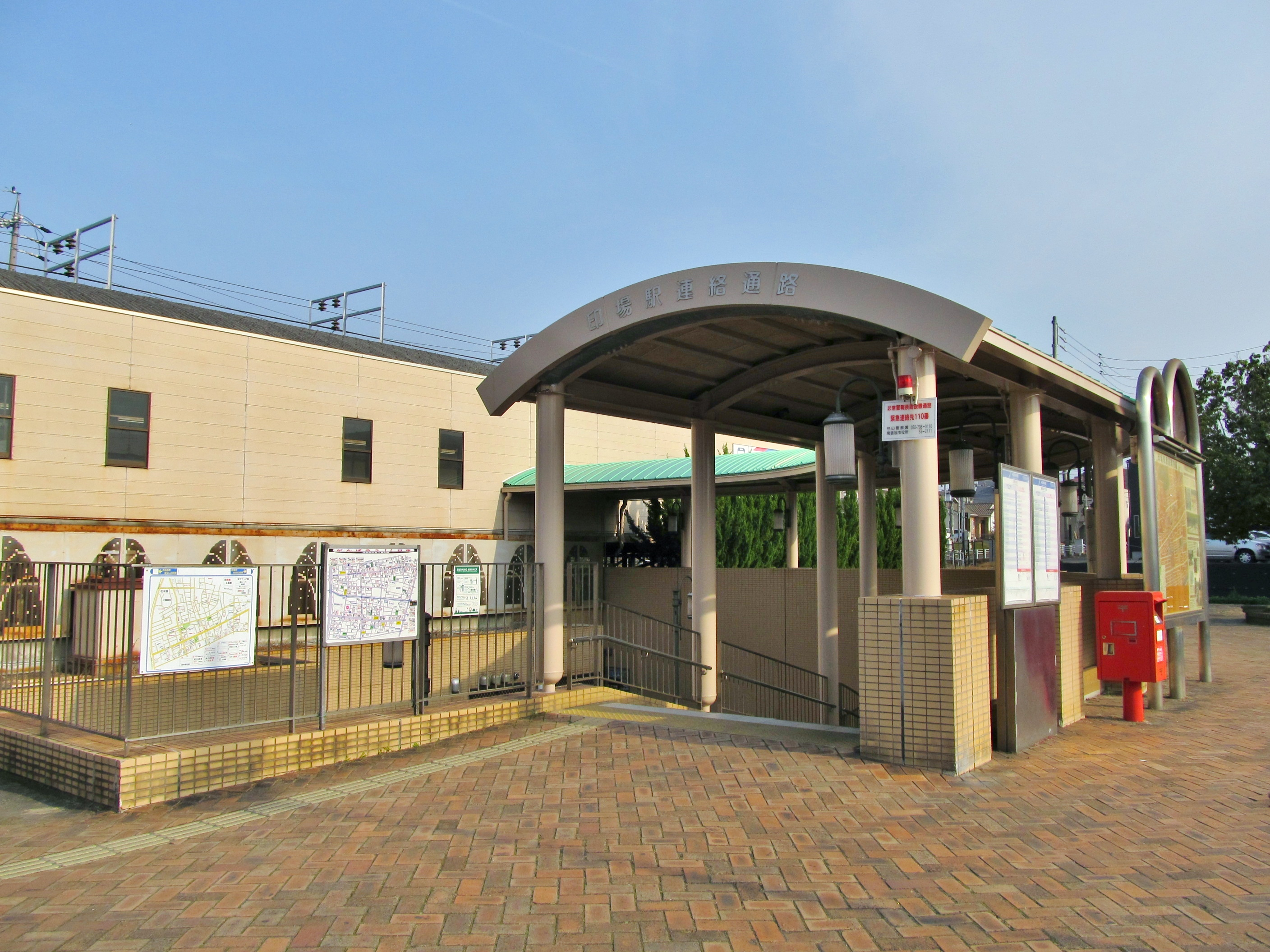
- South Exit, Inba Station, December 2018

General information
- Location: Kitayama Inbamotocho, Owariasahi-shi, Aichi-ken 488-0841; Japan
- Coordinates: 35.2110°N 137.0111°E
- Operator: Meitetsu
- Line: ■ Meitetsu Seto Line
- Distance: 12.2 kilometers from Sakaemachi
- Platforms: 2 side platforms

Other information
- Status: Unstaffed
- Station code: ST13
- Website: Official website

History
- Opened: April 2, 1905

Passengers
- FY2017: 5,439

Services
Preceding station	Meitetsu	Following station
Ōmori-Kinjōgakuin-mae towards Sakaemachi	Seto Line Local	Asahi-mae towards Owari Seto
Ōmori-Kinjōgakuin-mae towards Sakaemachi	Seto Line Semi Express	Asahi-mae towards Owari Seto
Location
- Location within Aichi Prefecture Location within Japan

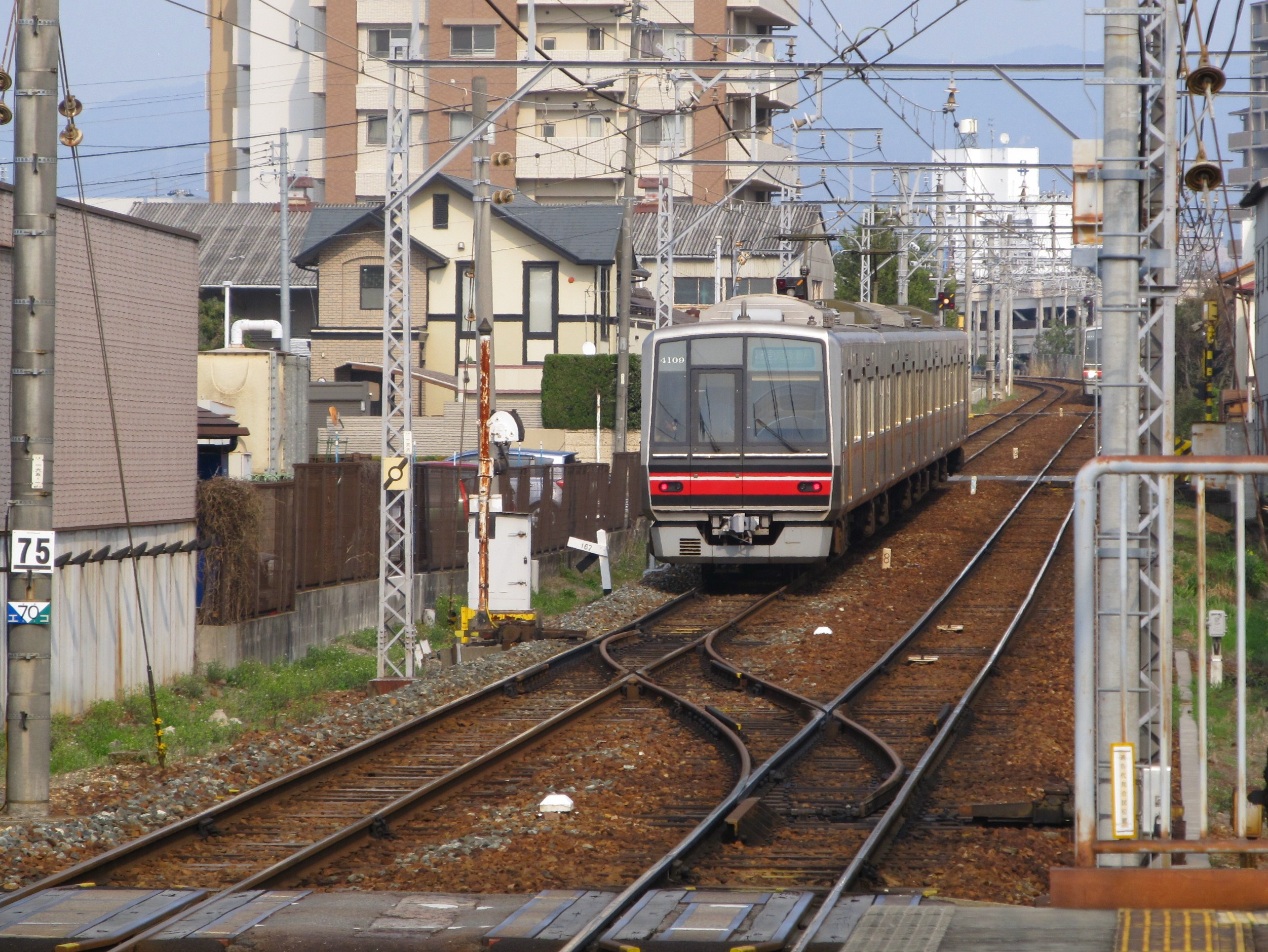
Crossover track at Sangō Station

Inba Station (印場駅, Inba-eki) is a railway station in the city of Owariasahi, Aichi Prefecture, Japan, operated by Meitetsu.

== Lines ==
Inba Station is served by the Meitetsu Seto Line, and is located 12.2 kilometers from the starting point of the line at Sakaemachi.

== Station layout ==
The station has two opposed side platforms connected by a footbridge. The station has automated ticket machines, Manaca automated turnstiles and is unattended.

=== Platforms ===
1	■ Meitetsu Seto Line	For Owari Seto
2	■ Meitetsu Seto Line	For Ōzone and Sakaemachi

== Station history ==
Inba Station was opened on April 2, 1905, as a station on the privately operated Seto Electric Railway. The Seto Electric Railway was absorbed into the Meitetsu group on September 1, 1939. The station was closed from 1944 to 1946 due to World War II, and was closed again on April 5, 1969. However, with the increase in residential developments in the surrounding areas, the station was reopened on December 22, 1995. It has been unattended since 2006.

== Passenger statistics ==
In fiscal 2017, the station was used by an average of 5,439 passengers daily.

== Surrounding area ==
- Hakuho Elementary School

== See also ==
- List of railway stations in Japan
