= Meitetsu 6600 series =

Japanese electric multiple unit train type

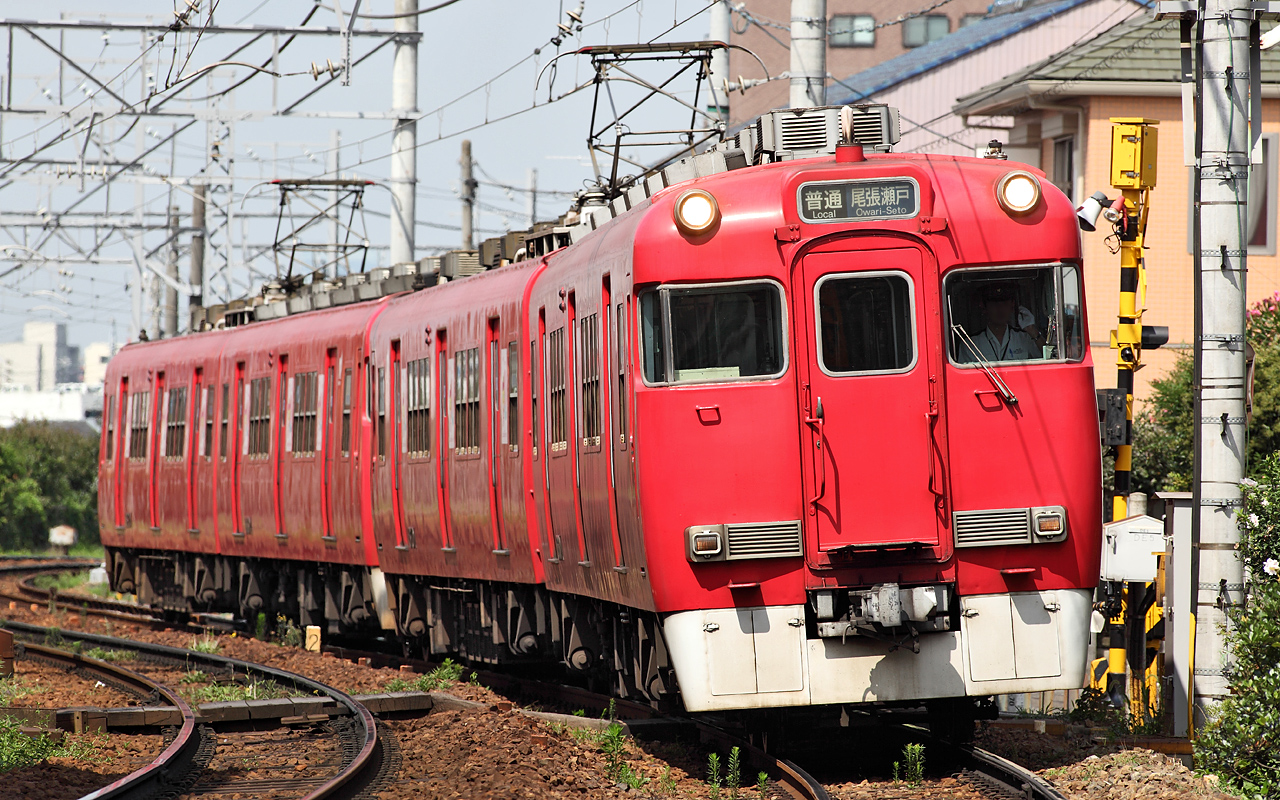
- Meitetsu 6600 series
- In service: 1978–2013
- Manufacturer: Nippon Sharyo
- Constructed: 1978
- Number built: 12 vehicles (6 sets)
- Number in service: None
- Operators: Nagoya Railroad
- Lines served: Seto Line

Specifications
- Doors: 3 per side
- Electric system(s): 1,500 V DC
- Current collector(s): Overhead catenary
- Safety system(s): Meitetsu ATS
- Track gauge: 1,067 mm (3 ft 6 in)

The Meitetsu 6600 series (名鉄6600系) was a commuter electric multiple unit type operated by Nagoya Railroad (Meitetsu) on Seto Line services in Japan from 1978 to 2013.

== Background ==
In the plan for subway constructions by Nagoya, the Seto Line was intended to have thorough service with the subway from Ozone Station. This plan was scrapped by the city after the construction plan was being shaped. However, Meitetsu made an agreement with the city in 1971 to connect Seto Line with Sakai Station. Because of this, the overhead voltage of the line was raised to 1,500V, and a new underground route was constructed for the urban areas of the line. The construction started in 1978. For the rolling stock after the construction, Meitetsu 3780 series was transferred to the line for express services, but fast acceleration was demanded for rolling stocks for local services to run through the line without waiting on sidetracks between express services. Meitetsu procured six 2-car sets based on the 6000 series design used on Nagoya Main Line services.

== History ==
The fleet entered revenue service in 1978. In 1988, the fleet was retrofitted with longitudinal seating and air conditioning to cope with increase capacity on the Seto Line (the sets were originally built with transverse seating).

Following the introduction of the 4000 series on the Seto Line, the 6600 series fleet was retired by 3 March 2013. By 15 March, all 6600 series sets had been scrapped.
