= Mizuno Station =

Railway station in Seto, Aichi Prefecture, Japan

Mizuno Station 水野駅

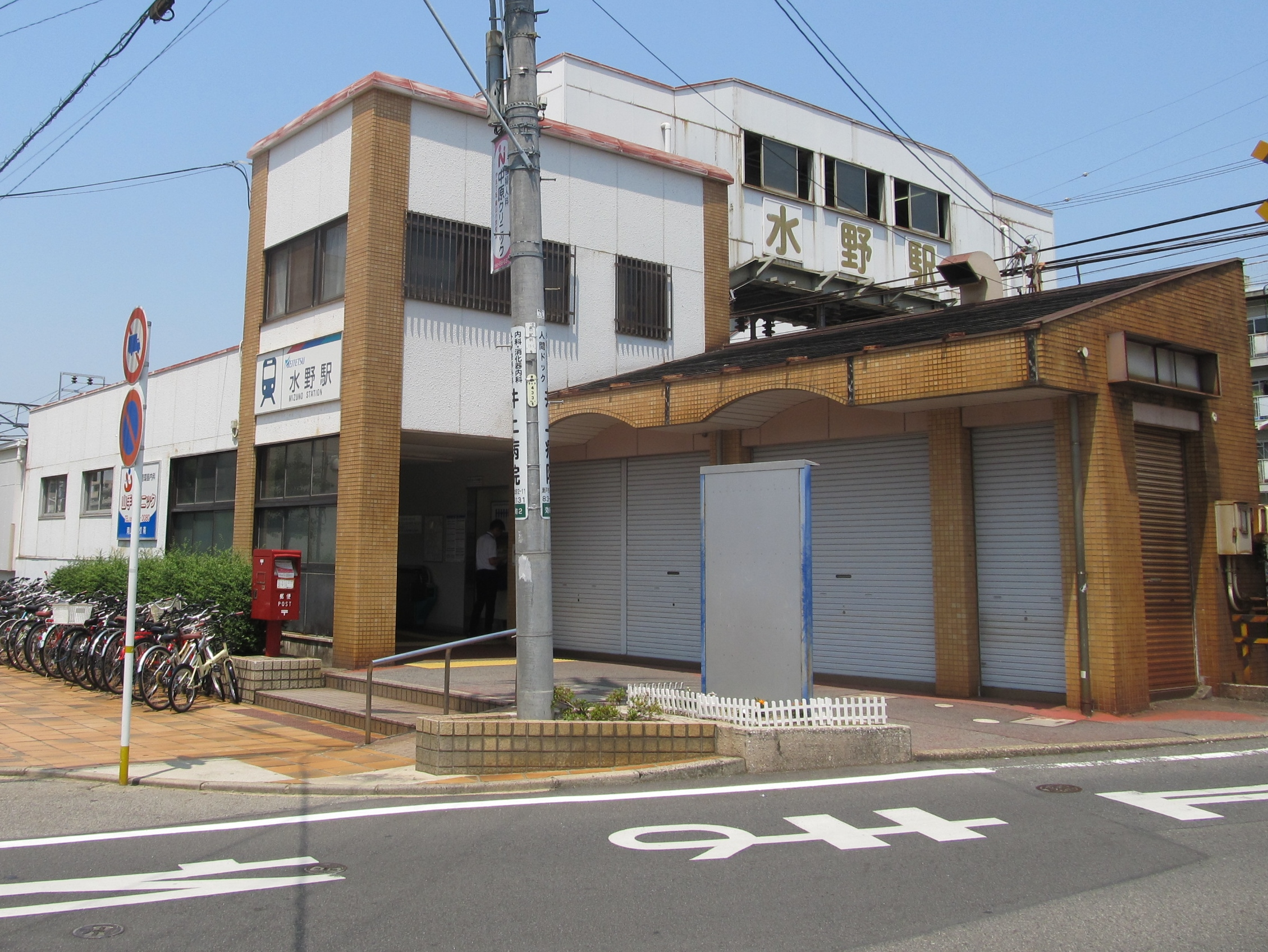
- Mizuno Station in June 2018

General information
- Location: 2-87 Kōhan-cho, Seto-shi, Aichi-ken 489-0917; Japan
- Coordinates: 35.2241°N 137.0696°E
- Operator: Meitetsu
- Line: ■ Meitetsu Seto Line
- Distance: 18.1 kilometers from Sakaemachi
- Platforms: 2 side platforms

Other information
- Status: Unstaffed
- Station code: ST17
- Website: Official website

History
- Opened: April 2, 1905
- Former names: Imamura (until 1939)

Passengers
- FY2017: 2604

Services
Preceding station	Meitetsu	Following station
Sangō towards Sakaemachi	Seto Line	Shin Seto towards Owari Seto
Location
- Location within Aichi Prefecture Location within Japan

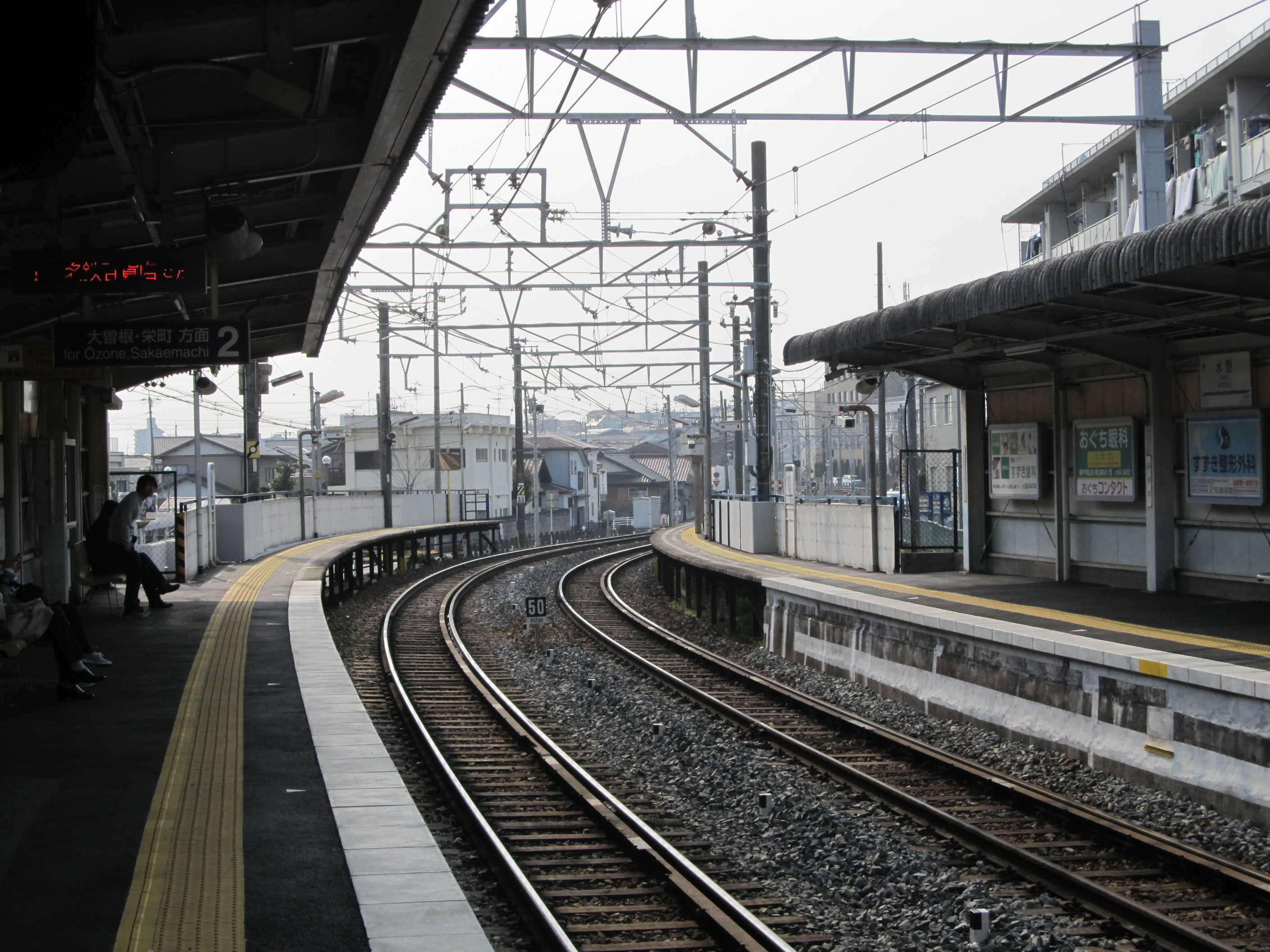
Platforms

Mizuno Station (水野駅, Mizuno-eki) is a railway station in the city of Seto, Aichi Prefecture, Japan, operated by Meitetsu.

== Lines ==
Mizuno Station is served by the Meitetsu Seto Line, and is located 18.1 kilometers from the starting point of the line at Sakaemachi.

== Station layout ==
The station has two opposed side platforms connected by a footbridge. The station has automated ticket machines, Manaca automated turnstiles and is unattended.

=== Platforms ===
1	■ Meitetsu Seto Line	For Owari Seto
2	■ Meitetsu Seto Line	For Sakaemachi

== Station history ==
Mizuno Station was opened on April 2, 1905, as Imamura Station (今村駅, Imamura-eki) on the privately operated Seto Electric Railway. The Seto Electric Railway was absorbed into the Meitetsu group on September 1, 1939, at which time the station was renamed to its present name.

== Passenger statistics ==
In fiscal 2017, the station was used by an average of 2604 passengers daily.

== Surrounding area ==
- Mizuno High School

== See also ==
- List of railway stations in Japan
