= Moriyama-Jieitai-Mae Station =

Railway station in Nagoya, Japan

Moriyama-Jieitai-Mae Station 守山自衛隊前駅

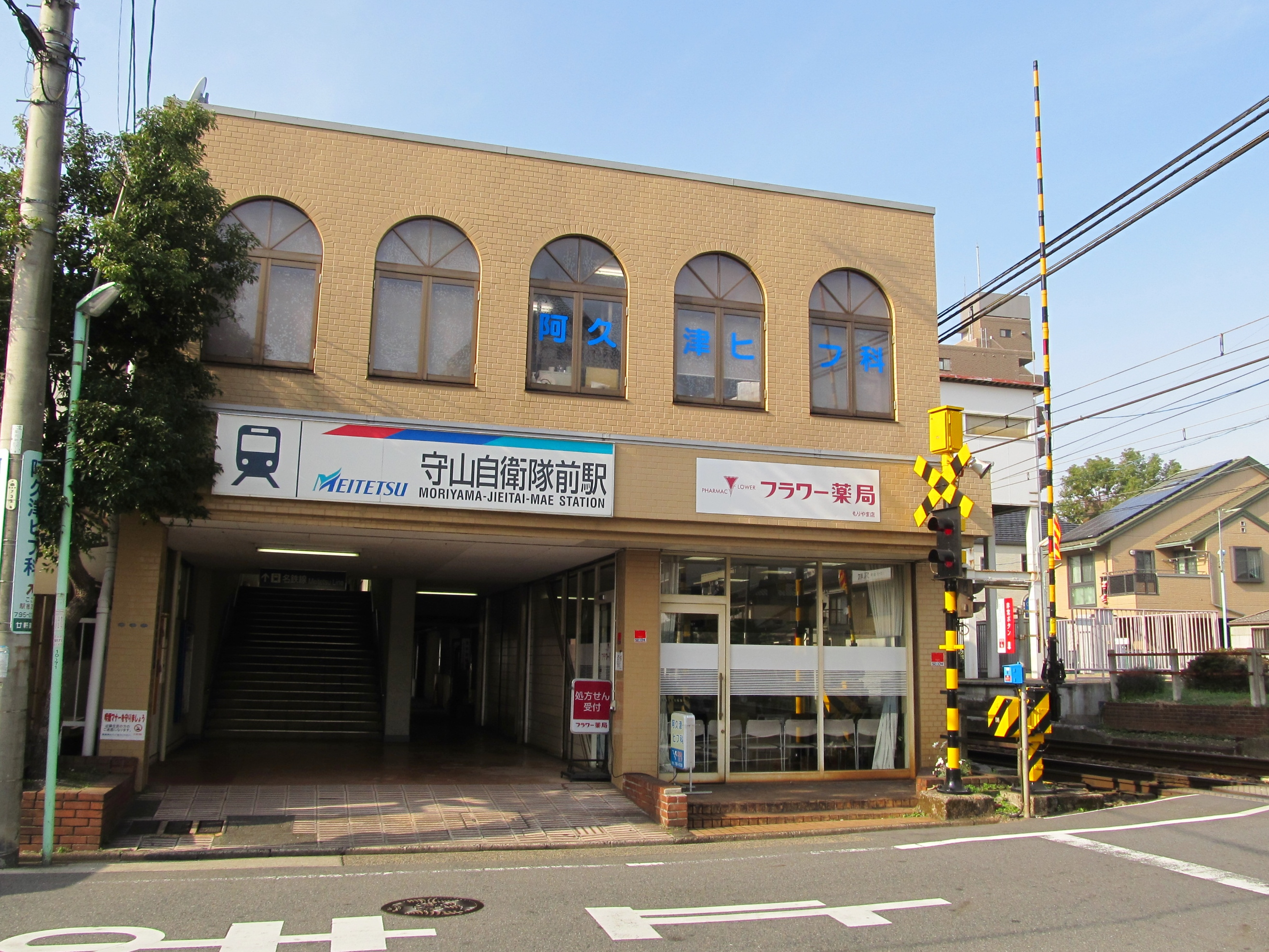
- Moriyama-Jieitai-Mae Station, December 2018

General information
- Location: 5-7 Nijikkenya, Moriyama-ku, Nagoya-shi, Aichi-ken 463-0065; Japan
- Coordinates: 35.1964°N 136.9578°E
- Operator: Meitetsu
- Line: ■ Meitetsu Seto Line
- Distance: 7.0 kilometers from Sakaemachi
- Platforms: 2 side platforms

Other information
- Status: Unstaffed
- Station code: ST08
- Website: Official website

History
- Opened: April 2, 1905
- Former names: Rentai-Mae (to 1941); Nijakenya (to 1946); Moriyama-machi (to 1955); Moriyama-shi (to 1966)

Passengers
- FY2017: 1331

Services
Preceding station	Meitetsu	Following station
Yada towards Sakaemachi	Seto Line Local	Hyōtan-yama towards Owari Seto
Location
- Location within Aichi Prefecture Location within Japan

Moriyama-Jieitai-Mae Station (守山自衛隊前駅, Moriyama-Jieitai-Mae-eki) is a railway station in Moriyama-ku, Nagoya, Aichi Prefecture, Japan, operated by Meitetsu.

== Lines ==
Moriyama-Jieitai-Mae Station is served by the Meitetsu Seto Line, and is located 7.0 kilometers from the starting point of the line at Sakaemachi.

== Station layout ==
The station has two opposed side platforms, connected to the station building by a footbridge. The station has automated ticket machines, Manaca automated turnstiles and is unattended.

=== Platforms ===
1	■ Meitetsu Seto Line	For Owari Seto
2	■ Meitetsu Seto Line	For Sakaemachi

== Station history ==
Moriyama-Jieitai-Mae Station was opened on April 2, 1905, as Rentai-Mae Station (聯隊前駅, Rentai-Mae-eki) on the privately operated Seto Electric Railway. It was named after its location in front of an Imperial Japanese Army base occupied by the IJA 33rd Infantry Regiment of the IJA 3r d Division. The Seto Electric Railway was absorbed into the Meitetsu group on September 1, 1939, and the station was renamed Nijakenya Station (二十軒家駅, Nijakenya-eki) on February 10, 1941, for security reasons. It was again renamed to Moriyama-machi Station (守山町, Moriyama-machi-eki) on June 1, 1946, and Moriyama-shi Station (守山市, Moriyama-shi-eki) on February 1, 1955. It assumed its present name on March 15, 1966. A new station building was completed on March 24, 1984. The station has been unattended after August 2006. The Tranpass system of magnetic fare cards with automatic turnstiles was implemented in 2012.

== Passenger statistics ==
In fiscal 2017, the station was used by an average of 1331 passengers daily.

== Surrounding area ==
This station provides access to Camp Moriyama, part of the Japan Ground Self Defence Force Tenth Division, which is responsible for Aichi and surrounding prefectures.

== See also ==
- List of railway stations in Japan
