= Shin-Seto Station =

Railway station in Seto, Aichi Prefecture, Japan

Shin-Seto Station 新瀬戸駅

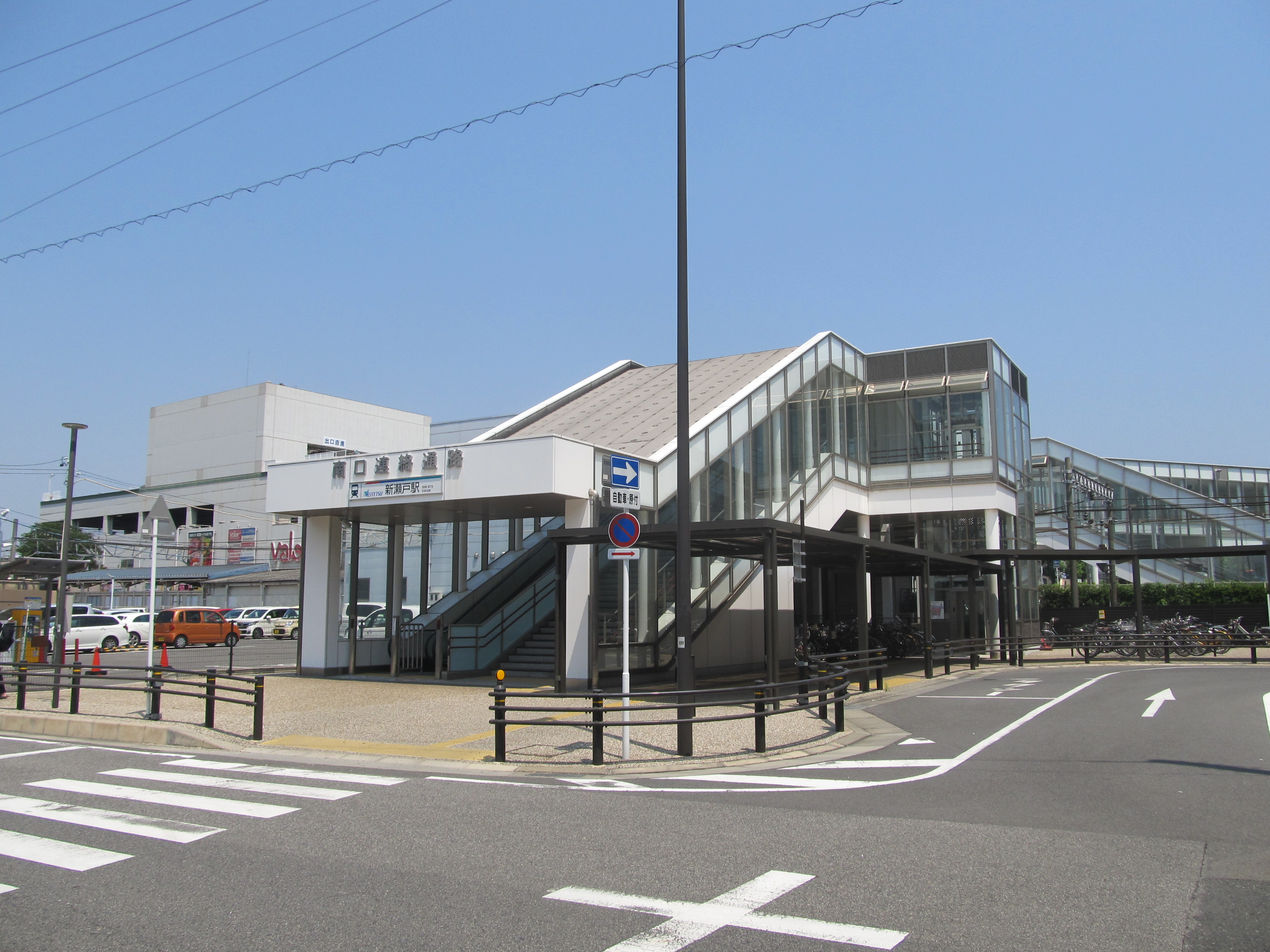
- Shin-Seto Station, June 2018

General information
- Location: Higashiyokoyamacho, Seto-shi, Aichi-ken 489-0066; Japan
- Coordinates: 35.2252°N 137.0771°E
- Operator: Meitetsu
- Line: ■ Meitetsu Seto Line
- Distance: 18.7 kilometers from Sakaemachi
- Platforms: 2 side platforms
- Connections: Aichi Loop Line (via Setoshi Station)

Other information
- Status: Staffed
- Station code: ST18
- Website: Official website

History
- Opened: April 2, 1905
- Former names: Yokoyama (to 1935), Owari-Yokoyama (until 1971)

Passengers
- FY2017: 5,018 daily

Services
Preceding station	Meitetsu	Following station
Mizuno towards Sakaemachi	Seto Line	Seto-Shiyakusho-mae towards Owari Seto
Location
- Location within Aichi Prefecture Location within Japan

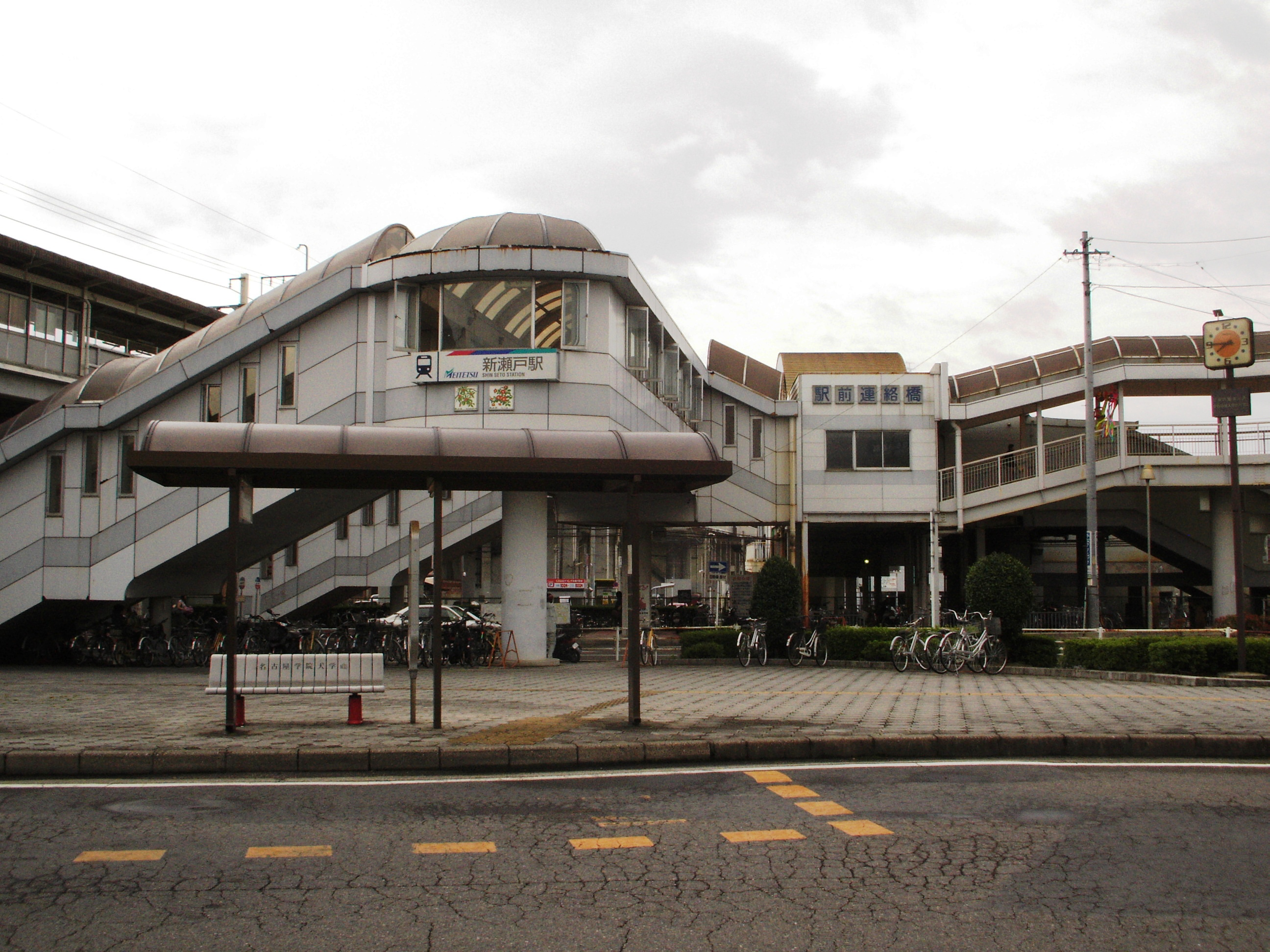
North Entrance

Shin-Seto Station (新瀬戸駅, Shin-Seto-eki) is a railway station in the city of Seto, Aichi Prefecture, Japan, operated by Meitetsu. Passengers can transfer to Setoshi Station on the Aichi Loop Line.

== Lines ==
Shin-Seto Station is served by the Meitetsu Seto Line, and is located 18.7 kilometers from the starting point of the line at Sakaemachi.

== Station layout ==
The station has two opposed side platforms connected by a footbridge. The station has automated ticket machines, Manaca automated turnstiles and is staffed.

=== Platforms ===
1	■ Meitetsu Seto Line	For Owari Seto
2	■ Meitetsu Seto Line	For Sakaemachi

== Station history ==
Shin-Seto Station was opened on April 2, 1905, as Yokoyama Station (横山駅, Yokoyama-eki) on the privately operated Seto Electric Railway. It was renamed Owari-Yokoyama Station (尾張横山駅, Owari-Yokoyama-eki) on June 1, 1935. The Seto Electric Railway was absorbed into the Meitetsu group on September 1, 1939. The station was renamed to its present name on October 1, 1971.

== Passenger statistics ==
In fiscal 2017, the station was used by an average of 5538 passengers daily.

== Surrounding area ==
- Seto Fire Department
- Suinan Elementary School

== See also ==
- List of railway stations in Japan
