= Ōmori-Kinjōgakuin-mae Station =

Railway station in Nagoya, Japan

Ōmori-Kinjōgakuin-mae Station 大森・金城学院前駅

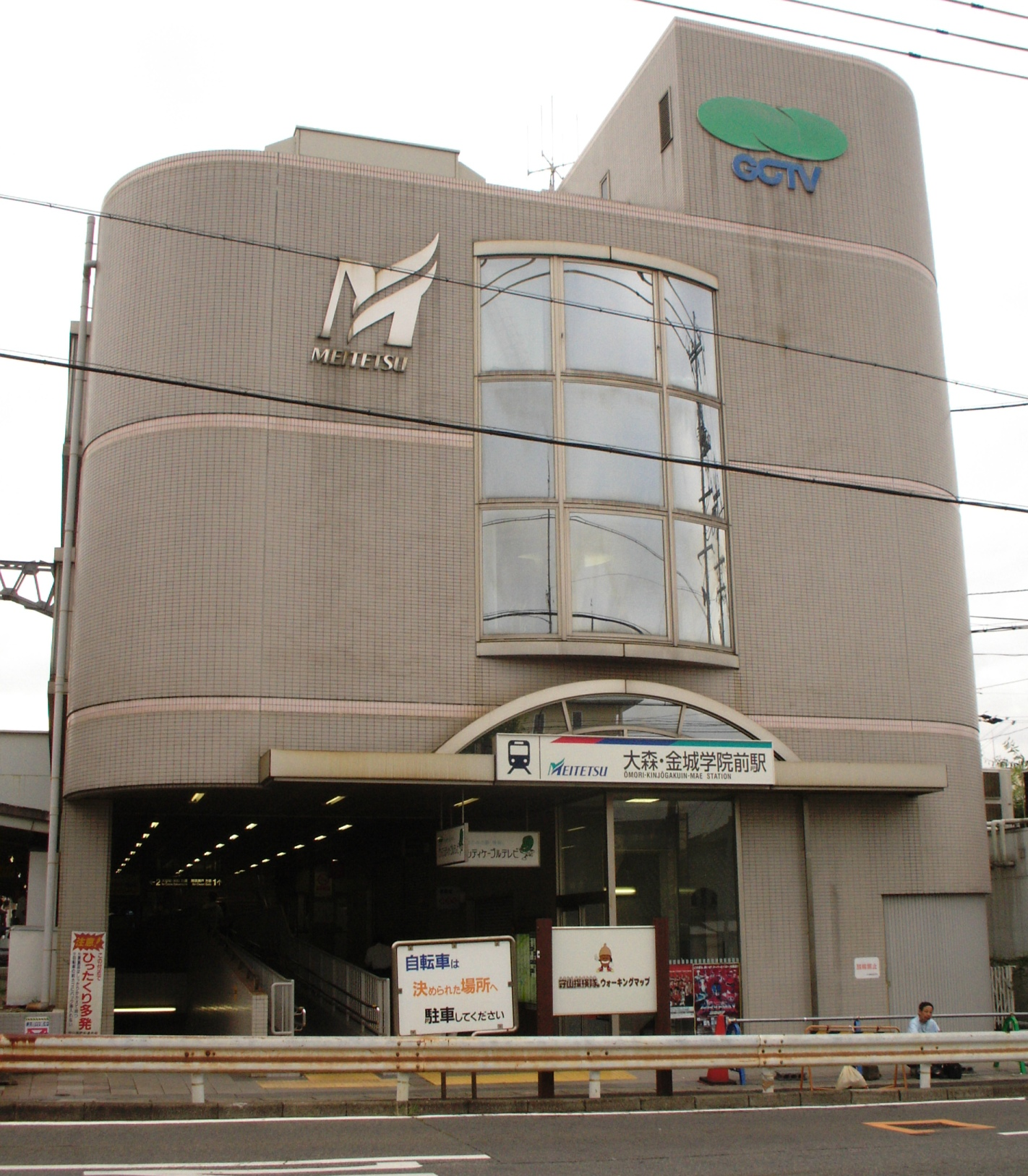
- Ōmori-Kinjōgakuin-mae Station in July 2008

General information
- Location: 3-301 Ōmori, Moriyama-ku, Nagoya-shi, Aichi-ken 463-0021; Japan
- Coordinates: 35.2070°N 136.9967°E
- Operator: Meitetsu
- Line: ■ Meitetsu Seto Line
- Distance: 10.7 kilometers from Sakaemachi
- Platforms: 2 side platforms

Other information
- Status: Unstaffed
- Station code: ST12
- Website: Official website

History
- Opened: April 2, 1905
- Former names: Ōmori (to 1992)

Passengers
- FY2017: 6495

Services
Preceding station	Meitetsu	Following station
Kitayama towards Sakaemachi	Seto Line Local Semi Express	Inba towards Owari Seto
Kitayama towards Sakaemachi	Seto Line Express	Owari Asahi towards Owari Seto
Location
- Location within Aichi Prefecture Location within Japan

Ōmori-Kinjōgakuin-mae Station (大森・金城学院前駅, Ōmori-Kinjōgakuin-mae-eki) is a railway station in Moriyama-ku, Nagoya, Aichi Prefecture, Japan, operated by Meitetsu.

== Lines ==
Ōmori-Kinjōgakuin-mae Station is served by the Meitetsu Seto Line, and is located 10.7 kilometers from the starting point of the line at Sakaemachi.

== Station layout ==
The station has two elevated opposed side platforms with the station building underneath. The station has automated ticket machines, Manaca automated turnstiles and is unattended..

=== Platforms ===
1	■ Meitetsu Seto Line	For Owari Seto
2	■ Meitetsu Seto Line	For Sakaemachi

== Station history ==
Ōmori-Kinjōgakuin-mae Station was opened on April 2, 1905, as Ōmori Station (大森駅, Ōmori-eki) on the privately operated Seto Electric Railway. The Seto Electric Railway was absorbed into the Meitetsu group on September 1, 1939. The station was renamed to its present name on November 14, 1992.

== Passenger statistics ==
In fiscal 2017, the station was used by an average of 6495 passengers daily.

== Surrounding area ==
- Kinjo Gakuin University
- Ōmori Junior High School
- Ōmori Elementary School

== See also ==
- List of railway stations in Japan
