= Yada Station =

Railway station in Nagoya, Japan

Yada Station 矢田駅

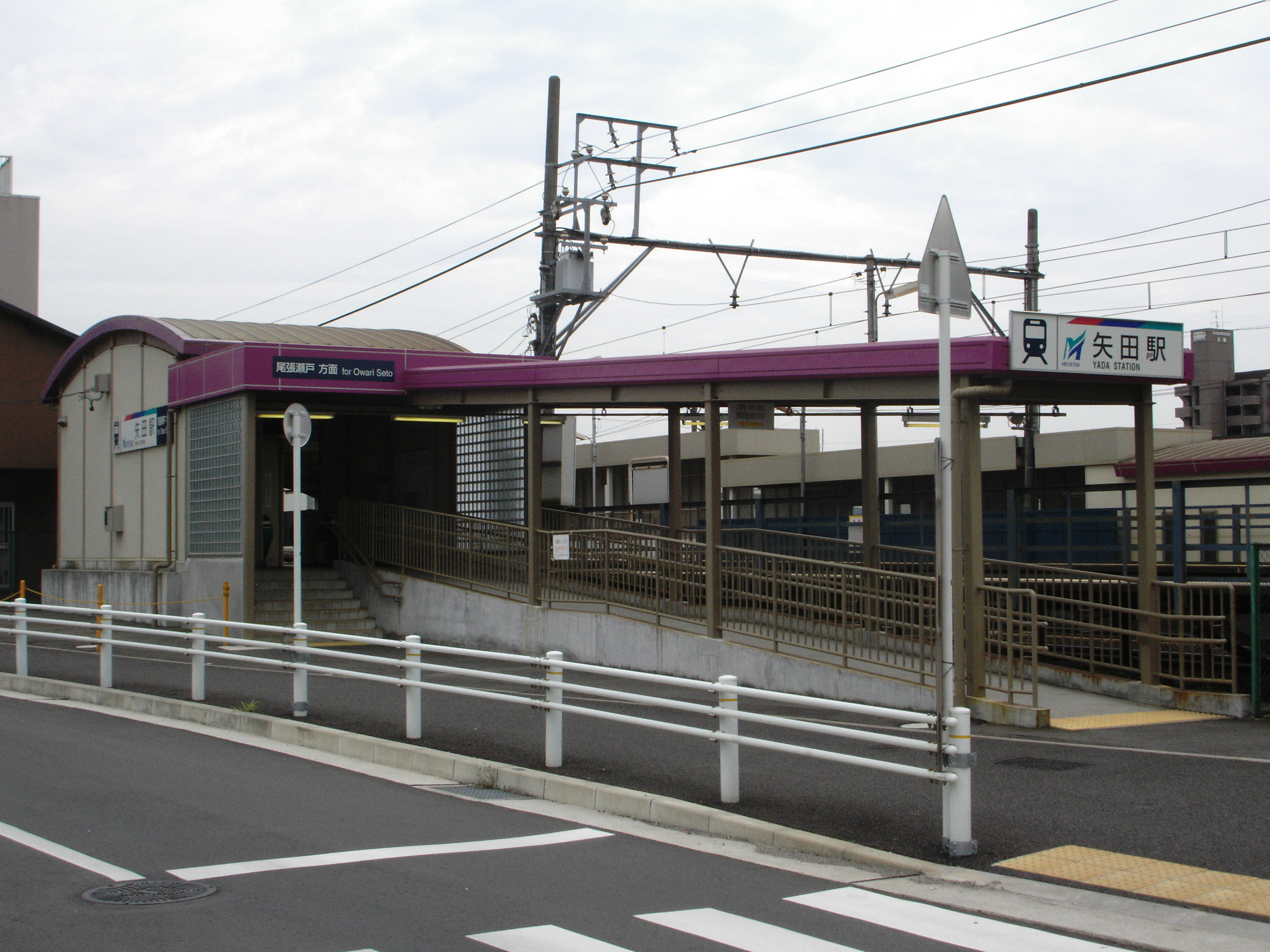
- Yada Station entrance for Owari Seto-bound passengers

General information
- Location: 1-6 Daikō, Higashi-ku, Nagoya-shi, Aichi-ken 461-0043; Japan
- Coordinates: 35.1936°N 136.948°E
- Operator: Meitetsu
- Line: ■ Meitetsu Seto Line
- Distance: 5.9 kilometers from Sakaemachi
- Platforms: 2 side platforms

Other information
- Status: Unstaffed
- Station code: ST07
- Website: Official website

History
- Opened: April 2, 1905

Passengers
- FY2017: 665

Services
Preceding station	Meitetsu	Following station
Ōzone towards Sakaemachi	Seto Line Local	Moriyama-Jieitai-Mae towards Owari Seto
Location
- Location within Aichi Prefecture Location within Japan

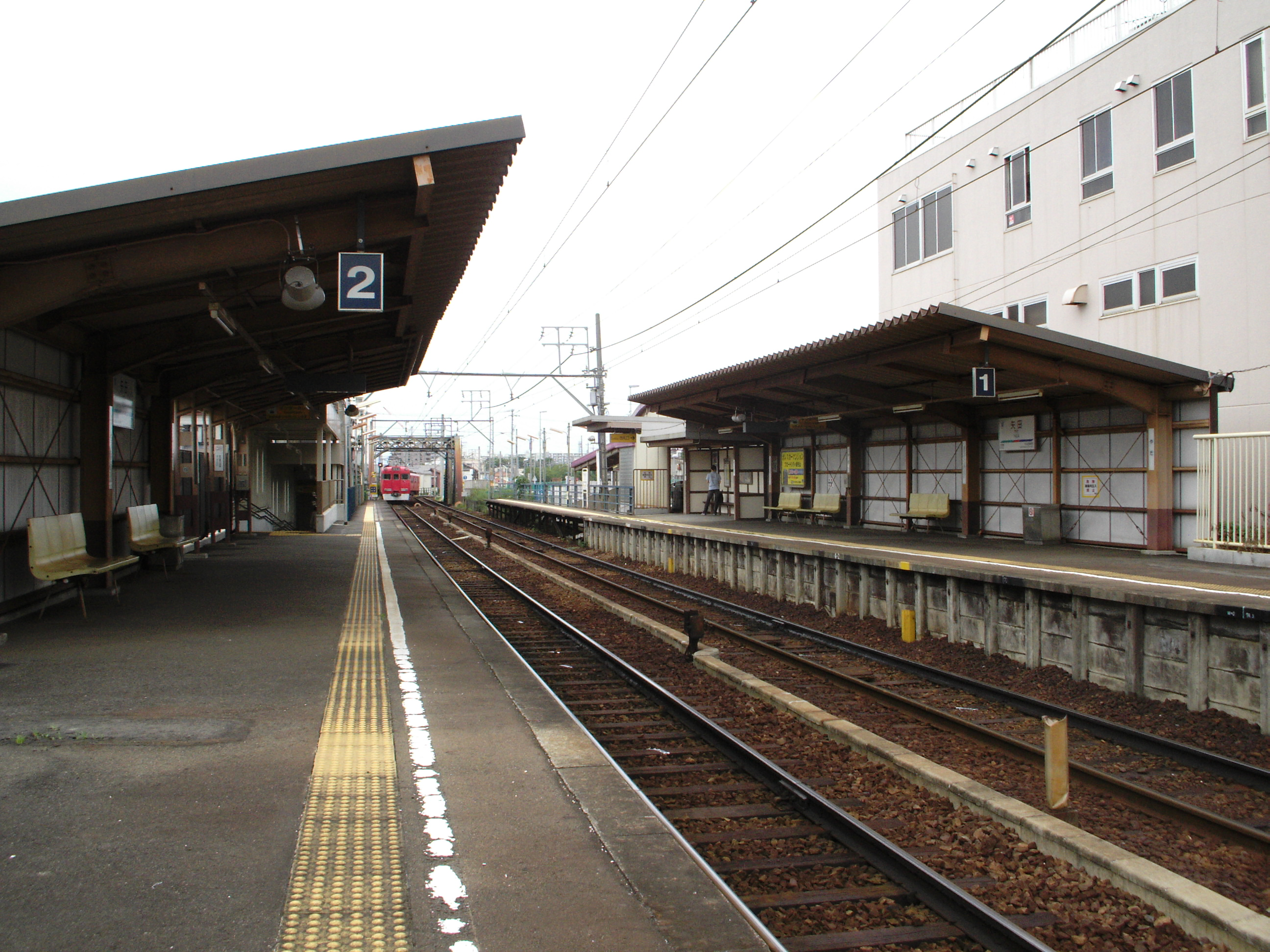
Platforms

Yada Station (矢田駅, Yada-eki) is a railway station in Higashi-ku, Nagoya, Aichi Prefecture, Japan, operated by Meitetsu.

== Lines ==
Yada Station is served by the Meitetsu Seto Line, and is located 5.9 kilometers from the starting point of the line at Sakaemachi.

== Station layout ==
The station has two elevated opposed side platforms with the station building underneath. The station has automated ticket machines, Manaca automated turnstiles and is unattended.

=== Platforms ===
1	■ Meitetsu Seto Line	For Owari Seto
2	■ Meitetsu Seto Line	For Sakaemachi

== Station history ==
Yada Station was opened on April 2, 1905. The station was rebuilt with elevated tracks in 1980. A new station building was completed on March 1, 2004. On December 16, 2006, the Tranpass system of magnetic fare cards with automatic turnstiles was implemented.

== Passenger statistics ==
In fiscal 2017, the station was used by an average of 665 passengers daily.

== Surrounding area ==
- Nagoya Dome

== See also ==
- List of railway stations in Japan
