= Vantelin Dome Nagoya =

Baseball stadium in Nagoya, Japan

Coordinates: 35°11′10″N 136°56′50″E

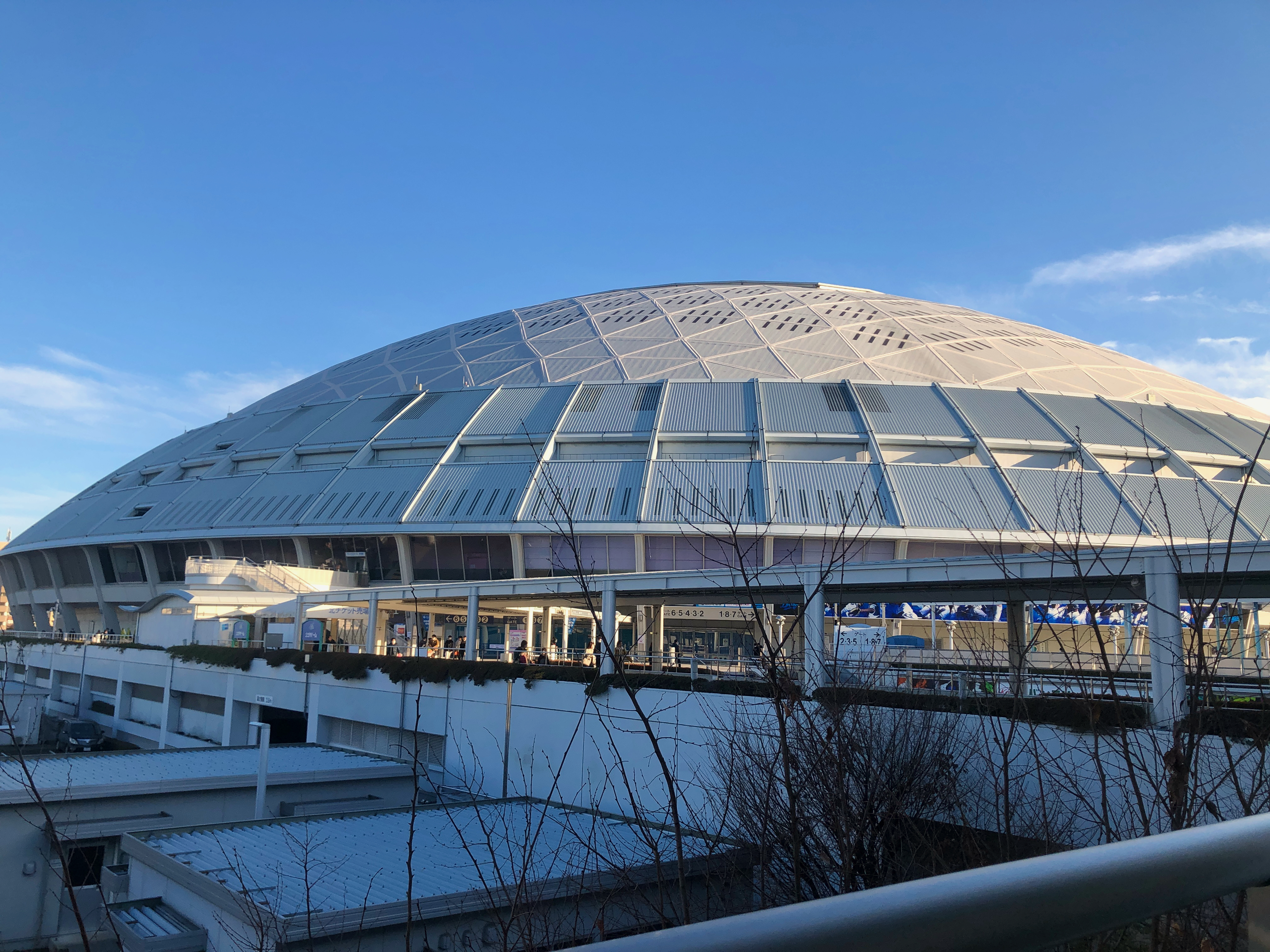
- Interactive map of Vantelin Dome Nagoya
- Location: Nagoya, Aichi Prefecture, Japan
- Owner: Nagoya Dome Co. (The Chunichi Shimbun Co.)
- Capacity: 36,418
- Roof: Dome
- Surface: Artificial turf
- Field size: Left Field – 100 m (328.1 ft); Center Field – 122 m (400.3 ft); Right Field – 100 m (328.1 ft); Height of Outfield Fence – 4.8 m (15.7 ft)
- Public transit: Nagoya Municipal Subway: Meijō Line at Nagoya Dome-mae Yada

Construction
- Opened: March 15, 1997

Tenant
- Chunichi Dragons (Central League) (1997–present)

The Nagoya Dome (ナゴヤドーム), known as Vantelin Dome Nagoya (バンテリンドーム ナゴヤ) for sponsorship reasons, is a domed baseball stadium, constructed in 1997, located in the city of Nagoya, Japan. The dome has the capacity of 36,418 for sports and 49,000 for concerts. It is an example of a geodesic dome.

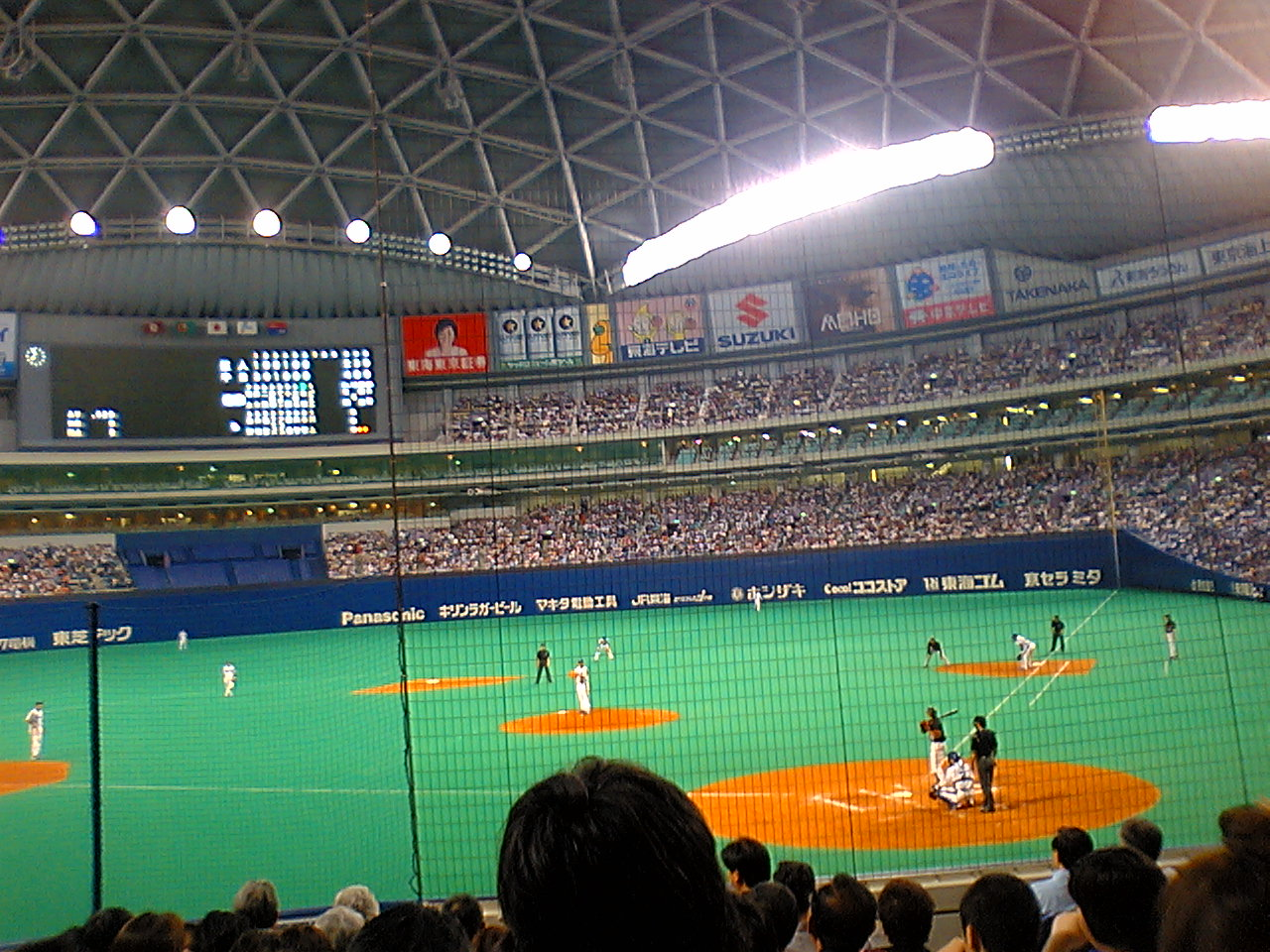
Baseball game

It has served as the home stadium for the Chunichi Dragons professional baseball team since its opening. It has also served the Orix BlueWave and Kintetsu Buffaloes, and hosted a single group stage game of the 2024 WBSC Premier12.

The official theme song for the Nagoya Dome, "Here for You", was written by local FM radio disc jockey James Havens and released on CD by Victor Entertainment.

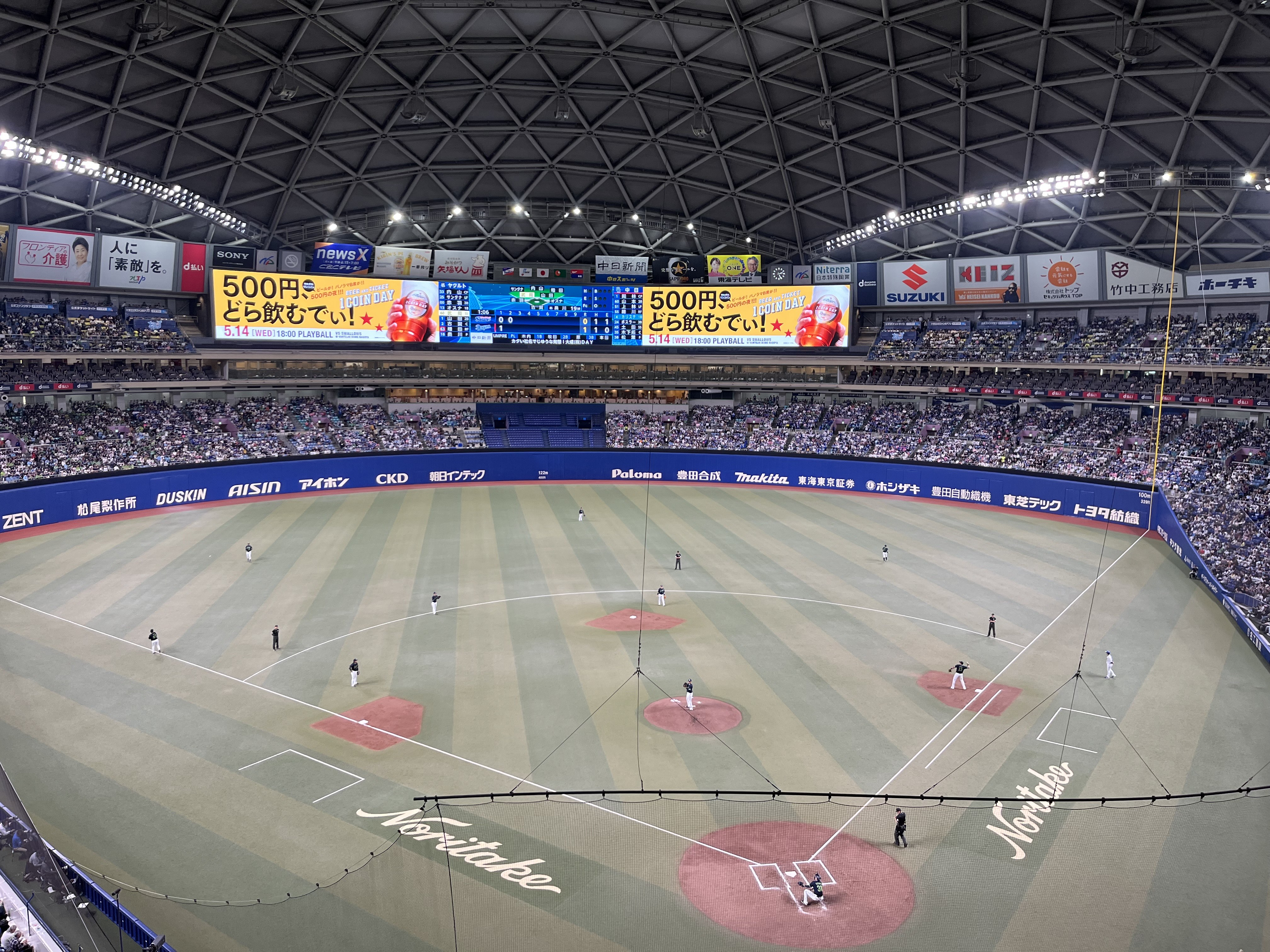
Nagoya Dome interior from top level behind home plate.

== Events ==
- Celine Dion performed at Nagoya Dome on February 3, 1999 as her part of Let's Talk About Love World Tour.

== Access ==
- Nagoya Municipal Subway Meijō Line, Nagoya GuideWay-Bus Yutorito Line
  - Nagoya Dome-mae Yada Station
  - Ōzone Station
- Central Japan Railway Company Chūō Main Line, Meitetsu Seto Line
  - Ōzone Station
- Meitetsu Seto Line
  - Yada Station

== Attendances ==
The home attendances of the Chunichi Dragons at the Vantelin Dome Nagoya:

Season	Games	Total attendance	Average attendance
2025	72	2,520,832	35,012

== See also ==
- Diagrid
- Thin-shell structure
- List of thin shell structures
- List of Nippon Professional Baseball stadiums
- Lists of stadiums
