= Kitayama Station (Aichi) =

Railway station in Nagoya, Japan

Kitayama Station 喜多山駅

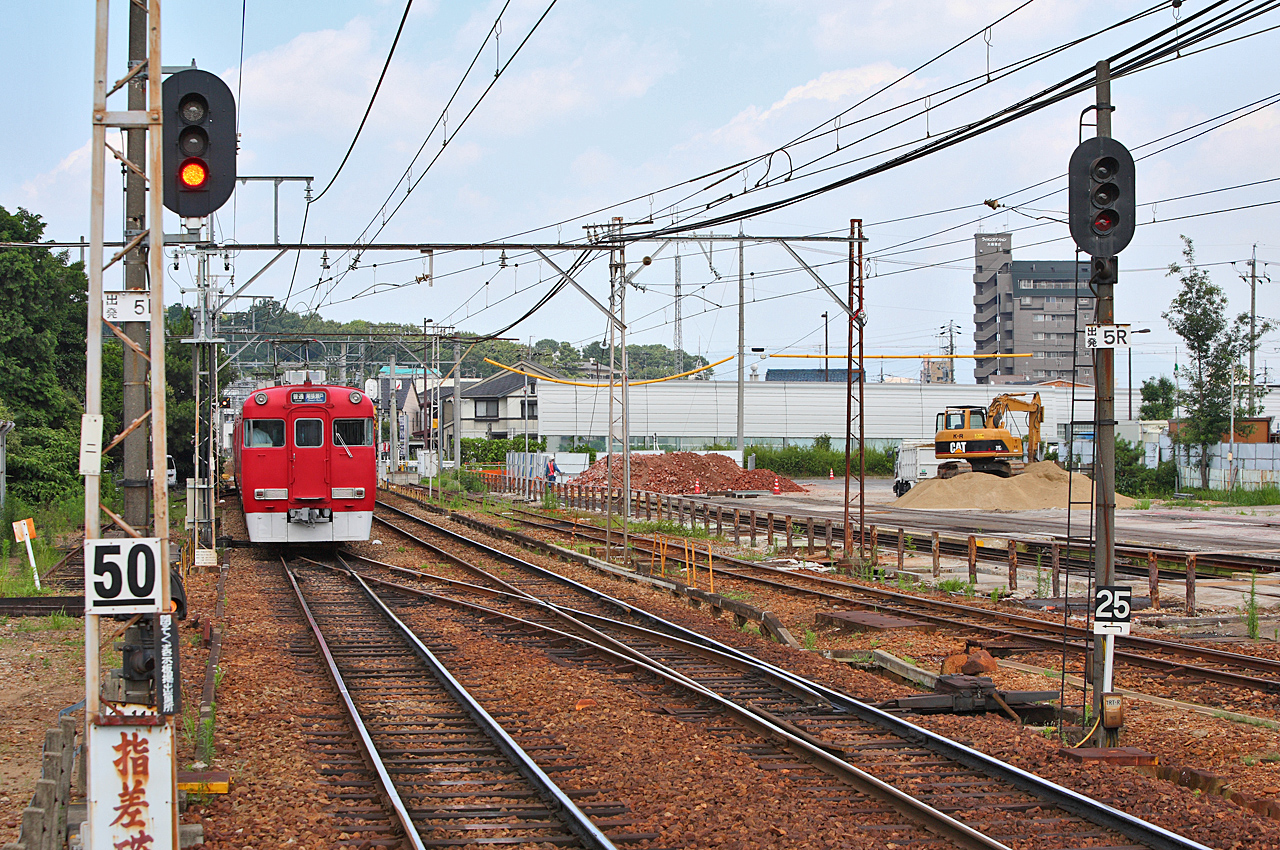
- Kitayama Station

General information
- Location: 2-1-6 Kitayama, Moriyama-ku, Nagoya-shi, Aichi-ken 463-0017; Japan
- Coordinates: 35.205°N 136.988°E
- Operator: Meitetsu
- Line: ■ Meitetsu Seto Line
- Distance: 9.9 kilometers from Sakaemachi
- Platforms: 1 side + 1 island platform

Other information
- Status: Unstaffed
- Station code: ST11
- Website: Official website

History
- Opened: July 1, 1927

Passengers
- FY2017: 3207

Services
Preceding station	Meitetsu	Following station
Obata towards Sakaemachi	Seto Line	Ōmori-Kinjōgakuin-mae towards Owari Seto
Location
- Location within Aichi Prefecture Location within Japan

Track Layout

Kitayama Station (喜多山駅, Kitayama-eki) is a railway station in Moriyama-ku, Nagoya, Aichi Prefecture, Japan, operated by Meitetsu.

== Lines ==
Kitayama Station is served by the Meitetsu Seto Line, and is located 9.9 kilometers from the starting point of the line at Sakaemachi.

== Station layout ==
The station has one side platform and one island platform with the island platform on a passing loop. The station has automated ticket machines, Manaca automated turnstiles and is unattended.

=== Platforms ===
1, 2	■ Meitetsu Seto Line	For Owari Seto
3	■ Meitetsu Seto Line	For Sakaemachi

== Station history ==
Kitayama Station was opened on July 1, 1927 on the privately operated Seto Electric Railway. The Seto Electric Railway was absorbed into the Meitetsu group on September 1, 1939. A new station building was completed in March 1964. From 1946 to 2007, Kitayama Station was also the inspection yard for trains on the Seto Line.

== Passenger statistics ==
In fiscal 2017, the station was used by an average of 3207 passengers daily.

== Surrounding area ==
- Moriyama Higashi Junior High School

== See also ==
- List of railway stations in Japan
