= Higashi Ōte Station =

Railway station in Nagoya, Japan

Higashi Ōte Station 東大手駅

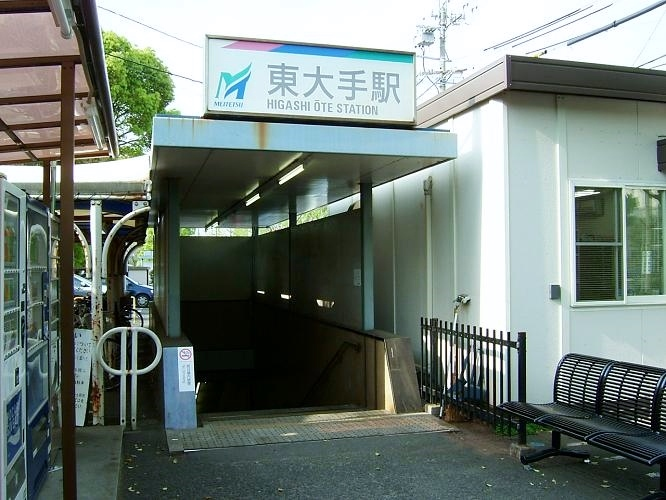
- Main entrance

General information
- Location: 4-3-2 Sannomaru, Naka-ku, Nagoya-shi, Aichi-ken 460-0001; Japan
- Coordinates: 35.1838°N 136.9083°E
- Operator: Meitetsu
- Line: ■ Meitetsu Seto Line
- Distance: 8.6 kilometers from Sakaemachi
- Platforms: 2 side platforms

Other information
- Status: Staffed
- Station code: ST02
- Website: Official website

History
- Opened: October 1, 1910
- Closed: 1944 to 1978

Passengers
- FY2017: 1846

Services
Preceding station	Meitetsu	Following station
Sakaemachi Terminus	Seto Line Local	Shimizu towards Owari Seto
Sakaemachi Terminus	Seto Line Semi Express Express	Ōzone towards Owari Seto
Location
- Location within Aichi Prefecture Location within Japan

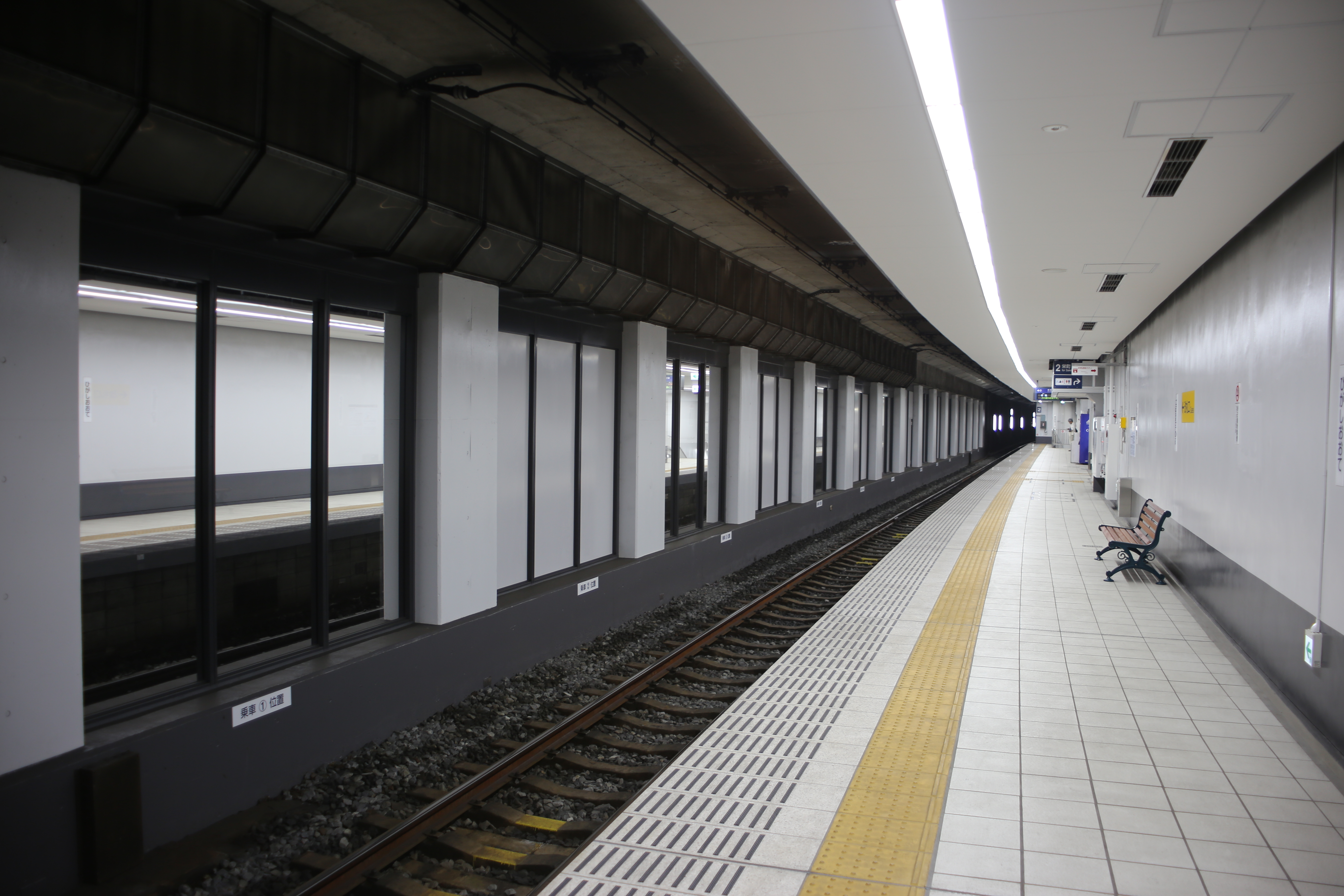
Platforms

Higashi Ōte Station (東大手駅, Higashiōte-eki) is a railway station in Naka-ku, Nagoya, Aichi Prefecture, Japan, operated by Meitetsu.

== Lines ==
Higashi Ōte Station is served by the Meitetsu Seto Line, and is located 1.5 kilometers from the starting point of the line at Sakaemachi.

== Station layout ==
The station has two underground opposed side platforms. The station has automated ticket machines, Manaca automated turnstiles and is staffed.

=== Platforms ===
1	■ Meitetsu Seto Line	For Owari Seto
2	■ Meitetsu Seto Line	For Sakaemachi

== Station history ==
Higashi Ōte Station was opened on October 1, 1910, but was closed in 1944. The station was reopened as an underground station on August 20, 1978 with the extension of the Seto Line to Sakaemachi Station. On December 16, 2006, the Tranpass system of magnetic fare cards with automatic turnstiles was implemented.

== Passenger statistics ==
In fiscal 2017, the station was used by an average of 1846 passengers daily.

== Surrounding area ==
- Nagoya Castle
- Aichi Prefectural Assembly
- Nagoya City Hall
- Aichi Prefectural Meiwa High School
- Nagoya Medical Center
- Nagoya City Archives

== See also ==
- List of railway stations in Japan
