= Seto-Shiyakusho-mae Station =

Railway station in Seto, Aichi Prefecture, Japan

Seto-Shiyakusho-mae Station 瀬戸市役所前駅

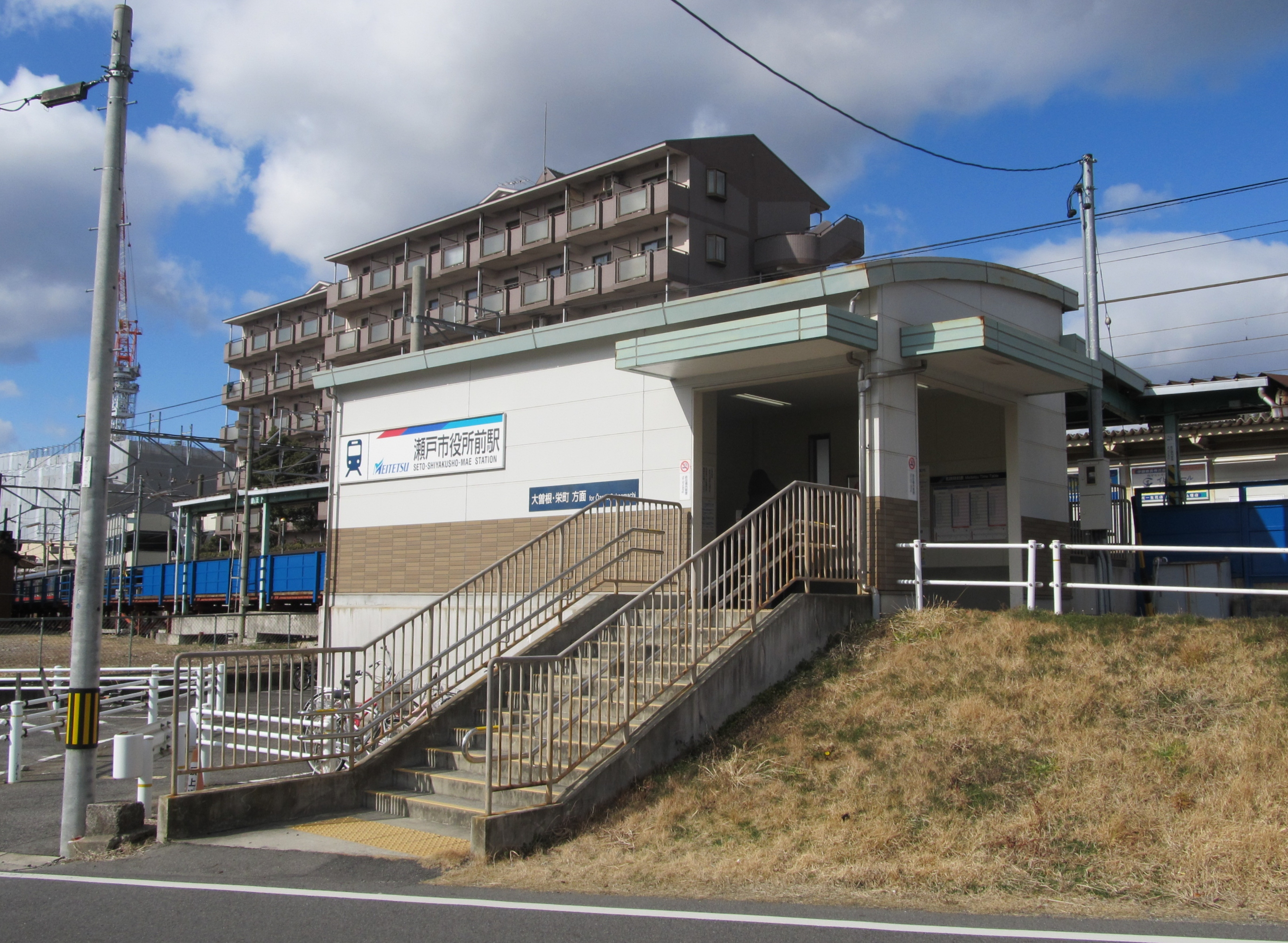
- Seto-Shiyakusho-mae Station in January 2013

General information
- Location: 2 Nishioiwakechō, Seto-shi, Aichi-ken 489-0065; Japan
- Coordinates: 35.2251°N 137.0843°E
- Operator: Meitetsu
- Line: ■ Meitetsu Seto Line
- Distance: 19.4 kilometers from Sakaemachi
- Platforms: 2 side platforms

Other information
- Status: Unstaffed
- Station code: ST19
- Website: Official website

History
- Opened: April 2, 1905
- Former names: Oiwake (追分) (until 1958)

Passengers
- FY2017: 1353

Services
Preceding station	Meitetsu	Following station
Shin Seto towards Sakaemachi	Seto Line	Owari Seto Terminus
Location
- Location within Aichi Prefecture Location within Japan

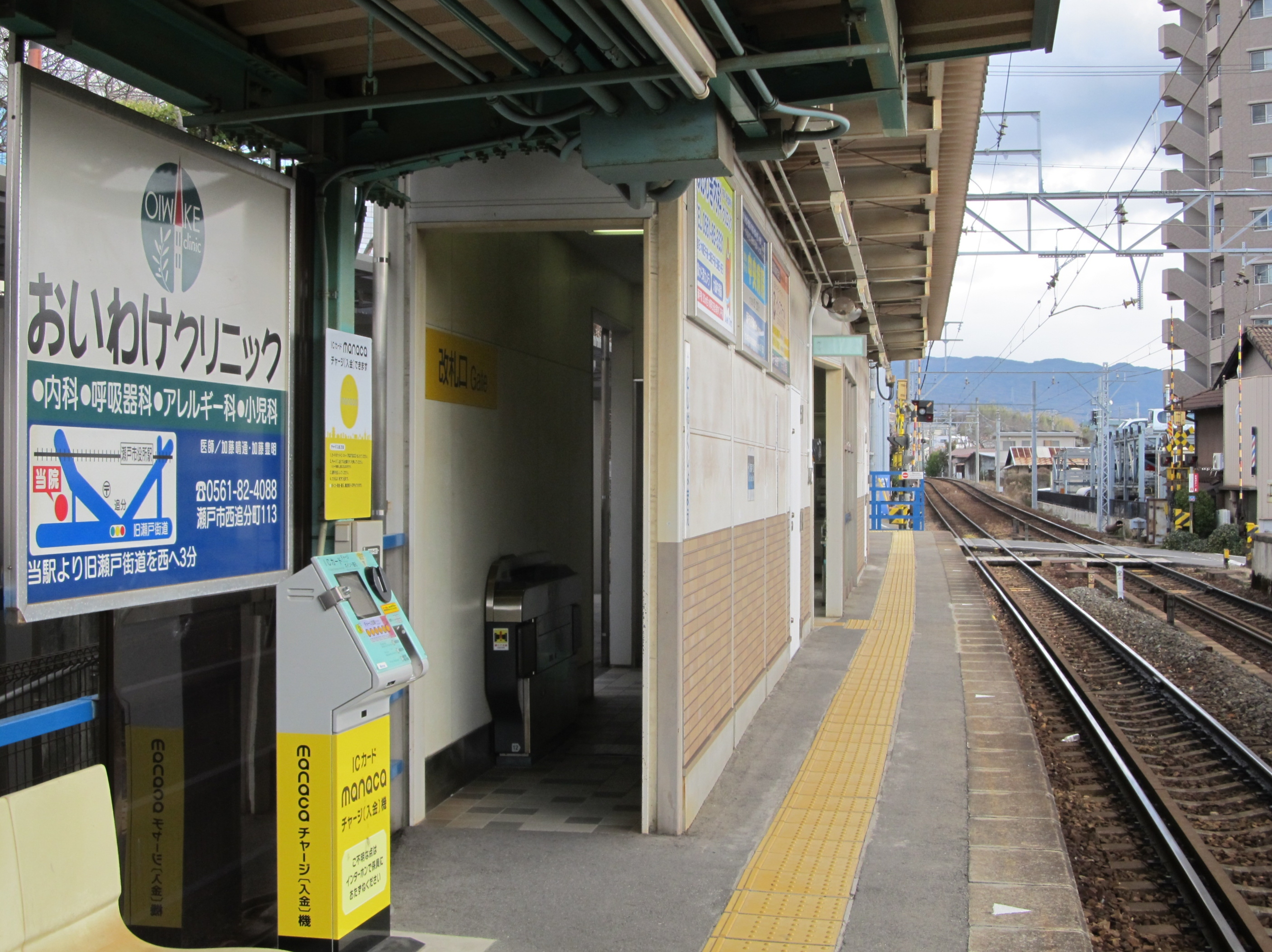
Platforms

Seto-Shiyakusho-mae Station (瀬戸市役所前駅, Seto-Shiyakusho-mae-eki) is a railway station in the city of Seto, Aichi Prefecture, Japan, operated by Meitetsu.

== Lines ==
Seto-Shiyakusho-mae Station is served by the Meitetsu Seto Line, and is located 19.4 kilometers from the starting point of the line at Sakaemachi.

== Station layout ==
The station has two opposed side platforms connected by a level crossing. The station has automated ticket machines, Manaca automated turnstiles and is unattended.

=== Platforms ===
1	■ Meitetsu Seto Line	For Owari Seto
2	■ Meitetsu Seto Line	For Sakaemachi

== Station history ==
Seto-Shiyakusho-mae Station was opened on April 2, 1905, as Oiwake Station (追分駅, Oiwake-eki) on the privately operated Seto Electric Railway. The Seto Electric Railway was absorbed into the Meitetsu group on September 1, 1939. It was renamed to its present name on January 20, 1958.

== Passenger statistics ==
In fiscal 2017, the station was used by an average of 1353 passengers daily.

== Surrounding area ==
- Seto City Hall

== See also ==
- List of railway stations in Japan
