= Obata Station (Aichi) =

Railway station in Nagoya, Japan

Obata Station 小幡駅

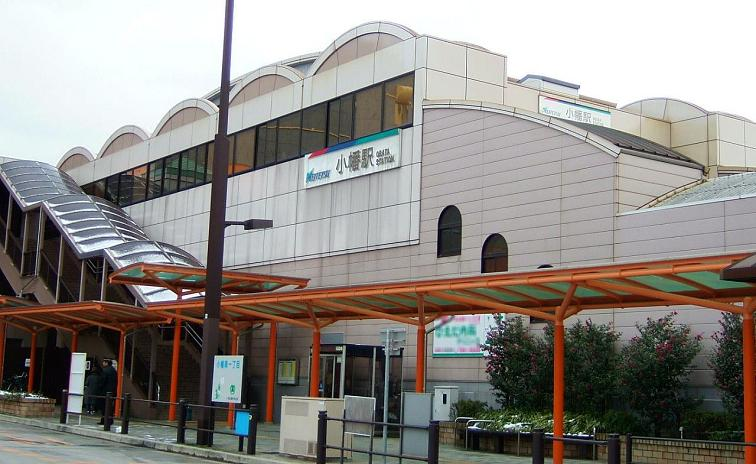
- Obata Station in February 2005

General information
- Location: 1-21-21 Obataminami, Moriyama-ku, Nagoya-shi, Aichi-ken 463-0048; Japan
- Coordinates: 35.2001°N 136.9758°E
- Operator: Meitetsu
- Line: ■ Meitetsu Seto Line
- Distance: 8.6 kilometers from Sakaemachi
- Platforms: 2 side platforms

Other information
- Status: Unstaffed
- Station code: ST10
- Website: Official website

History
- Opened: April 2, 1905

Passengers
- FY2017: 6650

Services
Preceding station	Meitetsu	Following station
Hyōtan-yama towards Sakaemachi	Seto Line Local	Kitayama towards Owari Seto
Ōzone towards Sakaemachi	Seto Line Semi Express Express	Kitayama towards Owari Seto
Location
- Location within Aichi Prefecture Location within Japan

Obata Station (小幡駅, Obata-eki) is a railway station in Moriyama-ku, Nagoya, Aichi Prefecture, Japan, operated by Meitetsu.

== Lines ==
Obata Station is served by the Meitetsu Seto Line, and is located 8.6 kilometers from the starting point of the line at Sakaemachi.

== Station layout ==
The station has two opposed side platforms, capable of handling trains of up to six carriages in length.. The station has automated ticket machines, Manaca automated turnstiles and is unattended.

=== Platforms ===
1	■ Meitetsu Seto Line	For Owari Seto
2	■ Meitetsu Seto Line	For Sakaemachi

== Station history ==
Obata Station was opened on April 2, 1905, on the privately operated Seto Electric Railway. The Seto Electric Railway was absorbed into the Meitetsu group on September 1, 1939. A new station building was completed in 1999-2000.

== Passenger statistics ==
In fiscal 2017, the station was used by an average of 6650 passengers daily.

== Surrounding area ==
- Moriyama Ward Office
- Moriyama Junior High School

== See also ==
- List of railway stations in Japan
