= Hyōtanyama Station =

Hyōtan-yama Station is the name of multiple train stations in Japan:

- Hyōtan-yama Station (Aichi), operated by Meitetsu's Seto Line, located in Moriyama-ku, Nagoya, Aichi Prefecture
- Hyōtan-yama Station (Osaka), on the Kintetsu Nara Line in Higashiōsaka, Osaka Prefecture
