= Hyōtan-yama Station (Aichi) =

Railway station in Nagoya, Japan

Hyōtan-yama Station 瓢箪山駅

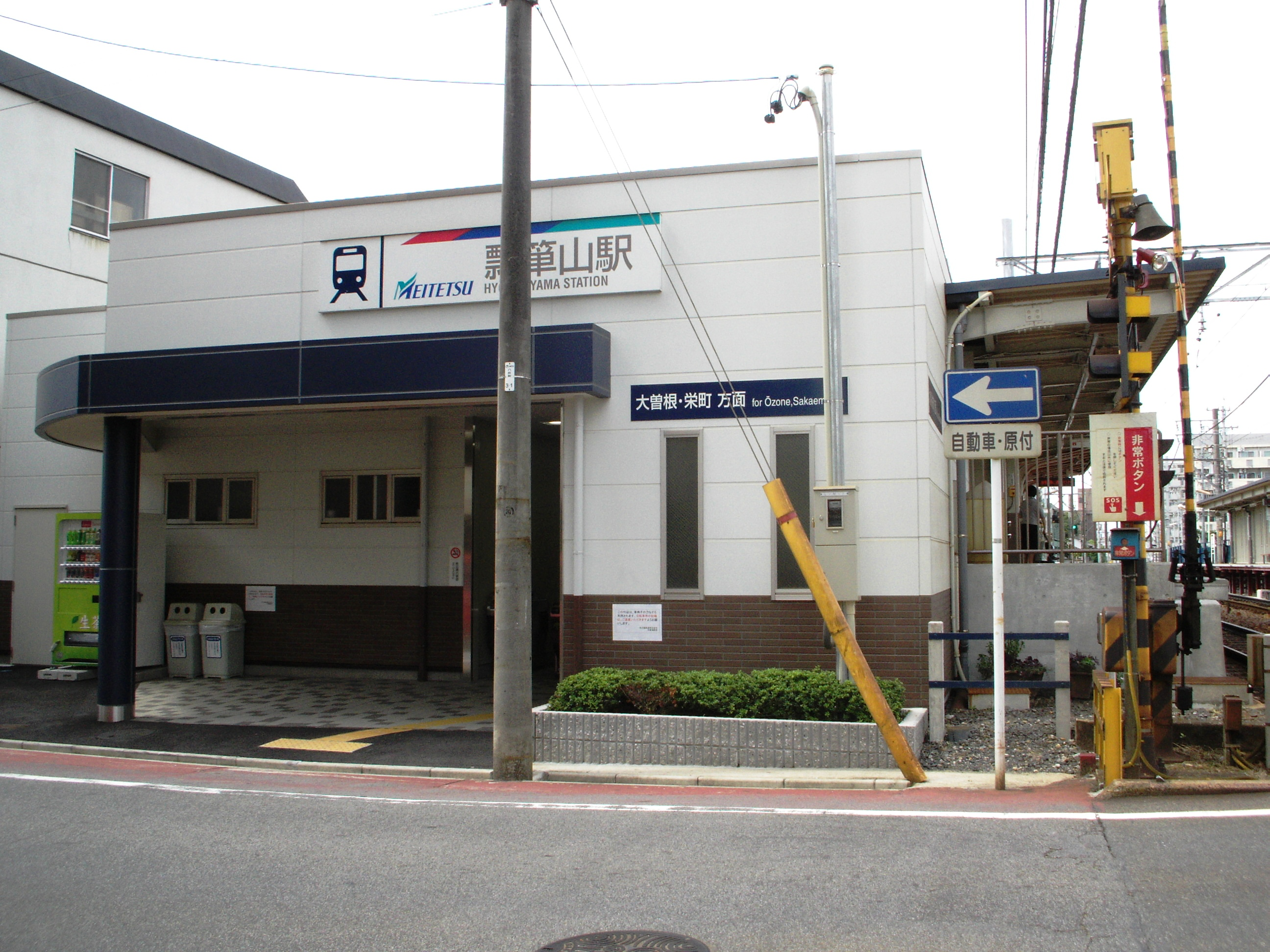
- Hyōtan-yama Station in September 2007

General information
- Location: 15-17 Chōei, Moriyama-ku, Nagoya-shi, Aichi-ken 463-0062; Japan
- Coordinates: 35.1972°N 136.964°E
- Operator: Meitetsu
- Line: ■ Meitetsu Seto Line
- Distance: 7.6 kilometers from Sakaemachi
- Platforms: 2 side platforms

Other information
- Status: Unstaffed
- Station code: ST09
- Website: Official website

History
- Opened: June 3, 1936
- Former names: Ōmori (to 1992)

Passengers
- FY2017: 2135

Services
Preceding station	Meitetsu	Following station
Moriyama-Jieitai-Mae towards Sakaemachi	Seto Line Local	Obata towards Owari Seto
Location
- Location within Aichi Prefecture Location within Japan

Hyōtan-yama Station (瓢箪山駅, Hyōtan-yama-eki) is a railway station in Moriyama-ku, Nagoya, Aichi Prefecture, Japan, operated by Meitetsu.

== Lines ==
Hyōtan-yama Station is served by the Meitetsu Seto Line, and is located 7.6 kilometers from the starting point of the line at Sakaemachi.

== Station layout ==
The station has two elevated opposed side platforms with the station building underneath. The station has automated ticket machines, Manaca automated turnstiles and is unattended.

=== Platforms ===
1	■ Meitetsu Seto Line	For Owari Seto
2	■ Meitetsu Seto Line	For Sakaemachi

== Station history ==
Hyōtan-yama Station was opened on June 3, 1936, on the privately operated Seto Electric Railway. The Seto Electric Railway was absorbed into the Meitetsu group on September 1, 1939. The station was closed from 1944 to 1946 due to World War 2. The platforms were lengthened in March 1978. A new station building was completed on October 6, 1981, and the station was staffed for the first time. However, with the introduction of the Tranpass system of magnetic fare cards with automatic turnstiles in December 2006, the station has again been unattended.

== Passenger statistics ==
In fiscal 2017, the station was used by an average of 2135 passengers daily.

== Surrounding area ==
- Hyōtanyama Kofun
- Moriyama Junior High School

== See also ==
- List of railway stations in Japan
