= Obata Station =

Obata Station may refer to:

- Obata Station (Aichi) (小幡駅), Japan
- Obata Station (Mie) (小俣駅), Japan
