= Meitetsu 4000 series =

Japanese train type

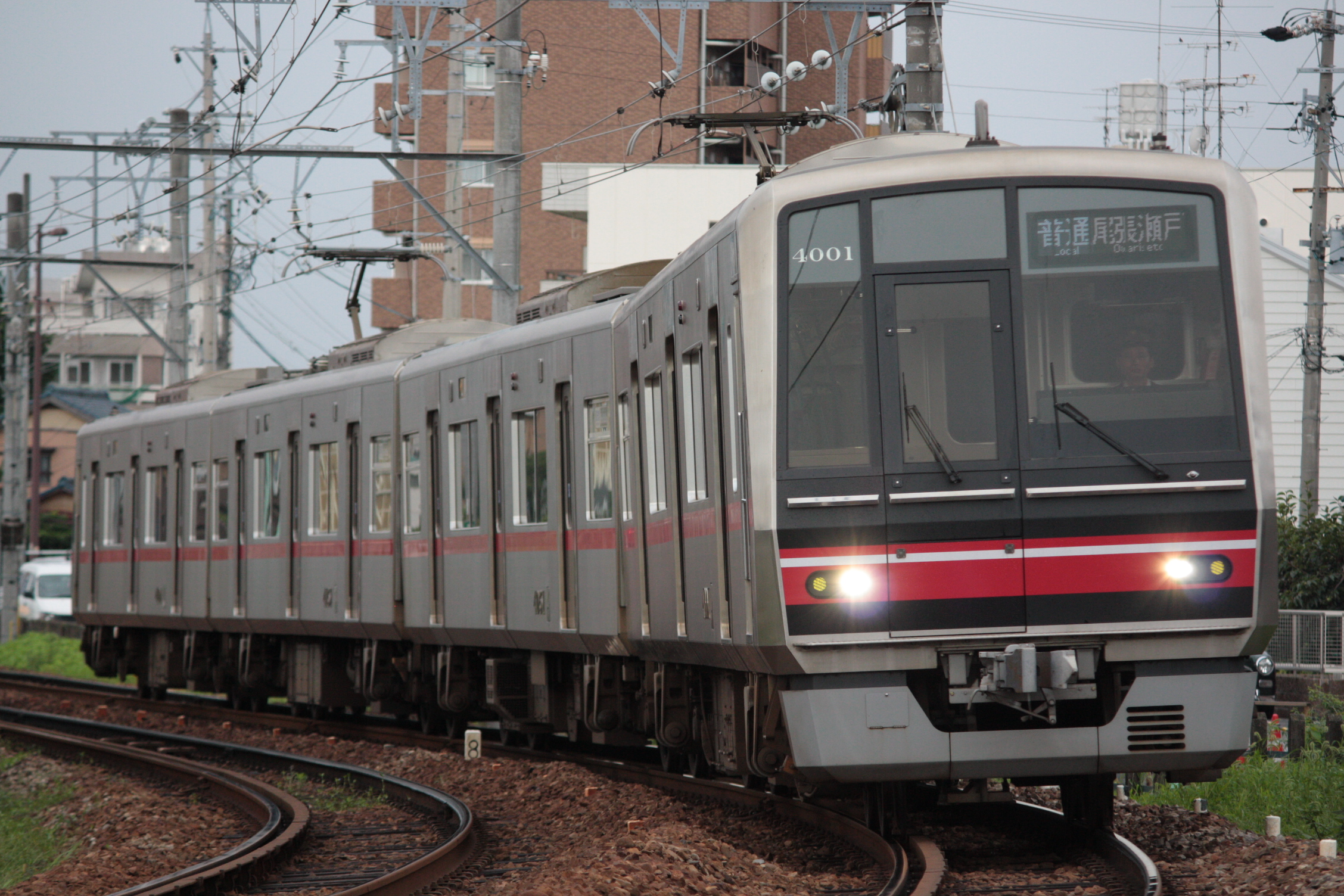
- 4000 series on the Seto Line, July 2009
- In service: 2008–present
- Manufacturer: Nippon Sharyo
- Constructed: 2008–2014
- Entered service: 1 October 2008
- Number built: 72 vehicles (18 sets)
- Number in service: 72 vehicles (18 sets)
- Formation: 4 cars per trainset
- Operator: Meitetsu
- Depot: Owari Asahi
- Line served: Seto Line

Specifications
- Car body construction: Stainless steel
- Car length: 18,385 mm (60 ft 4 in) (end cars); 18,230 mm (59 ft 10 in) (intermediate cars)
- Width: 2,744 mm (9 ft 0 in)
- Doors: 3 pairs per side
- Maximum speed: 100 km/h (62 mph)
- Traction system: Variable frequency (IGBT)
- Acceleration: 3.0 km/(h⋅s) (1.9 mph/s)
- Deceleration: 3.5 km/(h⋅s) (2.2 mph/s) (service); 4.0 km/(h⋅s) (2.5 mph/s) (emergency)
- Electric systems: 1,500 V DC
- Current collection: Overhead
- Track gauge: 1,067 mm (3 ft 6 in)

The Meitetsu 4000 series (名鉄4000系) is a commuter electric multiple unit (EMU) train type operated by Nagoya Railroad (Meitetsu) in Japan since 2008.

== Formation ==
Trains are formed as follows.

Designation	Tc1	M2	M1	Tc2
Designation	4000	4050	4150	4100

The M1 and M2 cars each have one single-arm pantograph.

== Interior ==
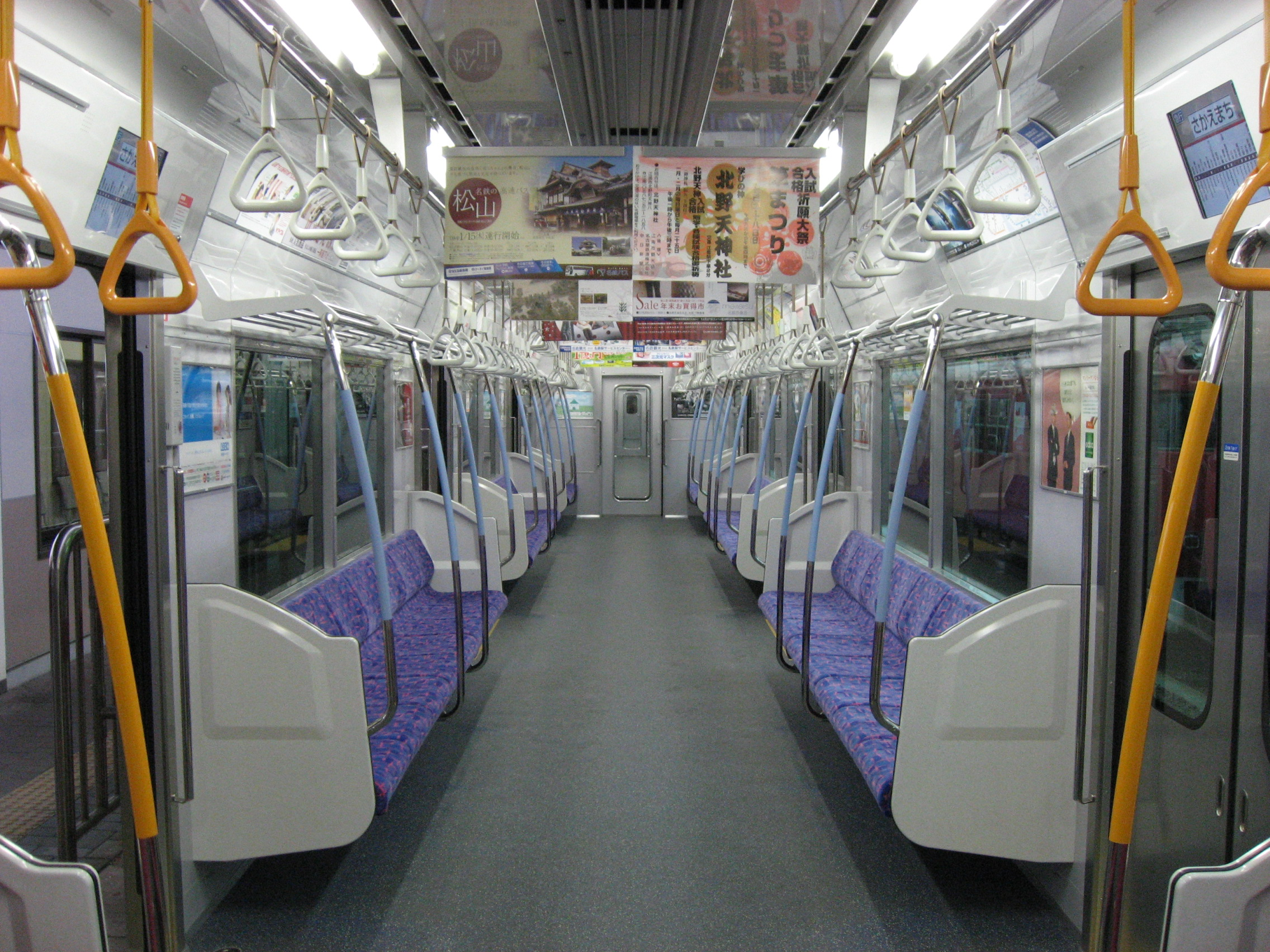

== History ==
The first 4-car set was built in 2008 for use on the Meitetsu Seto Line, entering service on 1 October 2008. Two more sets were delivered in April and May 2009, followed by two more sets in October and November 2009.

Two sets were delivered during fiscal 2011, bringing the total fleet to 32 vehicles (8 sets) by March 2012. Five sets were delivered during spring and summer of 2012, and three sets each in early 2013 and 2014. The 4000 series now consists of 18 four-car sets, thus completely replacing the older types 6000, 6600 and 6750. Since April 2014, the 4000 series has been the only train type on the Seto Line.
