= Meitetsu Seto Line =

Railway line in Nagoya, Japan

Seto Line

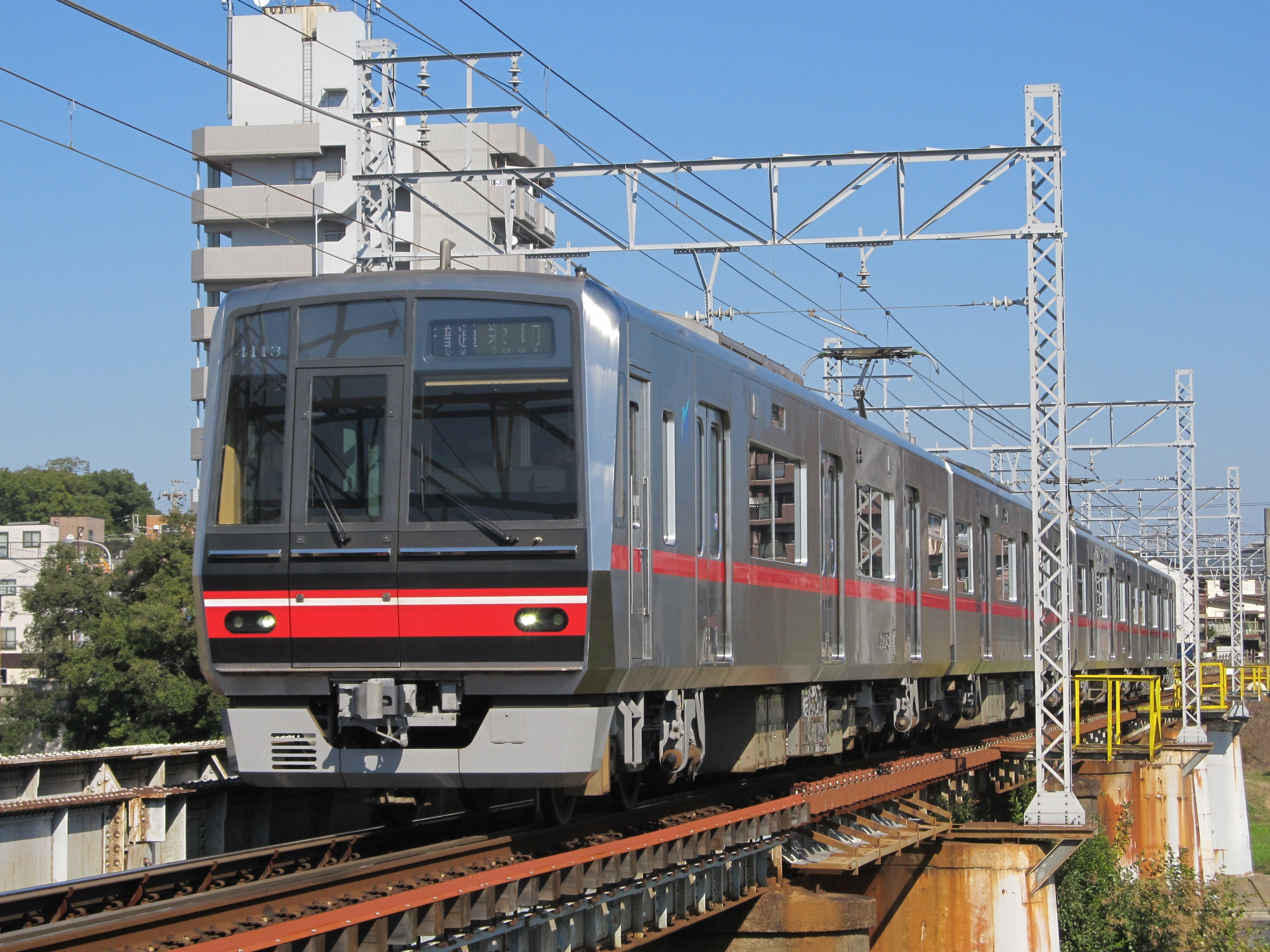
- A Meitetsu 4000 series EMU on the Seto Line

Overview
- Native name: 瀬戸線
- Status: In service
- Owner: Nagoya Railroad Co., Ltd.
- Line number: ST
- Locale: Aichi Prefecture
- Termini: Sakaemachi; Owari Seto
- Stations: 20

Service
- Type: Commuter rail
- System: Meitetsu
- Operator(s): Nagoya Railroad Co., Ltd.
- Rolling stock: Meitetsu 3300 series; Meitetsu 4000 series

History
- Opened: April 2, 1905; 121 years ago

Technical
- Line length: 20.6 km (12.8 mi)
- Track gauge: 1,067 mm (3 ft 6 in)
- Electrification: 1,500 V DC, overhead catenary

The Seto Line (瀬戸線, Seto-sen) is a Japanese railway line which connects Sakaemachi in Higashi-ku, Nagoya, Aichi Prefecture with Owari Seto in Seto, Aichi. It is owned and operated by the private railway operator Meitetsu. The line is also nicknamed Setoden (瀬戸電) after the line's former operator Seto Electric Railway (瀬戸電気鉄道, Seto Denki Tetsudō).

== History ==
The railway was opened by the Seto Automatic Railway (瀬戸自動鉄道, Seto Jidō Tetsudō) between Owari Seto and Yada on 2 April 1905, and extended it to Ōzone the following year on 1 March. The passenger service was provided by Serpollet steam-powered railcars, but these proved to be underpowered and unreliable. The line was soon electrified with the first electric-powered train running on 17 March 1907 with 600 V DC. The company changed its name to Seto Electric Railway (瀬戸電気鉄道, Seto Denki Tetsudō) in December 1906. By 1 October 1911, the line was extended to Horikawa, in the outer moat of Nagoya Castle. The line was duplicated by December 1929. In 1939, the company merged with Meitetsu. As the line were isolated from any other Meitetsu railway lines, rolling stock used in the line at this time were trains built by Seto Electric Railway or older trains relocated from the main lines of Meitetsu. Some older station buildings from the initial days of the line, such as the station buildings of Ōzone and Owari Seto were also used into the late Shōwa era.

The Horikawa to Shimizu section closed on 15 February 1976 to allow for the construction of the new line to Sakaemachi and the connection to the Nagoya Subway Higashiyama Line, which opened in 1978. The voltage on the line was raised to 1,500 V DC, and freight services ceased the same year.

== Operations ==
=== Station list ===
All stations are in Aichi Prefecture.

No.	Name	Japanese	Distance from Sakaemachi (km)	Local	Semi Express	Express	Connections	Location
ST01	Sakaemachi	栄町	0.0	●	●	●	Sakae: Higashiyama Line (H10) Meijō Line (M05)	Higashi-ku, Nagoya
ST02	Higashiōte	東大手	1.5	●	●	●		Naka-ku, Nagoya
ST03	Shimizu	清水	2.2	●	|	|		Kita-ku, Nagoya
ST04	Amagasaka	尼ヶ坂	2.7	●	|	|		Kita-ku, Nagoya
ST05	Morishita	森下	3.6	●	|	|		Higashi-ku, Nagoya
ST06	Ōzone	大曽根	4.6	●	●	●	Chūō Main Line (CF04); Meijō Line (M12); Nagoya Guideway Bus Yutorito Line	Higashi-ku, Nagoya
ST07	Yada	矢田	5.9	●	|	|		Higashi-ku, Nagoya
ST08	Moriyama-Jieitai-Mae	守山自衛隊前	7.0	●	|	|	Nagoya Guideway Bus Yutorīto Line (via Moriyama :Y04)	Moriyama-ku, Nagoya
ST09	Hyōtan-yama	瓢箪山	7.6	●	|	|		Moriyama-ku, Nagoya
ST10	Obata	小幡	8.6	●	●	●		Moriyama-ku, Nagoya
ST11	Kitayama	喜多山	9.9	●	●	●		Moriyama-ku, Nagoya
ST12	Ōmori-Kinjōgakuin-mae	大森・金城学院前	10.7	●	●	●		Moriyama-ku, Nagoya
ST13	Inba	印場	12.2	●	●	|		Owariasahi
ST14	Asahi-mae	旭前	13.1	●	●	|		Owariasahi
ST15	Owari Asahi	尾張旭	14.7	●	●	●		Owariasahi
ST16	Sangō	三郷	16.1	●	●	●		Owariasahi
ST17	Mizuno	水野	18.0	●	●	●		Seto
ST18	Shin Seto	新瀬戸	18.7	●	●	●	Aichi Loop Line (via Setoshi: 21)	Seto
ST19	Seto-Shiyakusho-mae	瀬戸市役所前	19.4	●	●	●		Seto
ST20	Owari Seto	尾張瀬戸	20.6	●	●	●		Seto
