= Ōzone Station =

Railway, metro, and guided bus station in Nagoya, Japan

Coordinates: 35.1916°N 136.9369°E

CF04 M12 Ōzone Station 大曽根駅

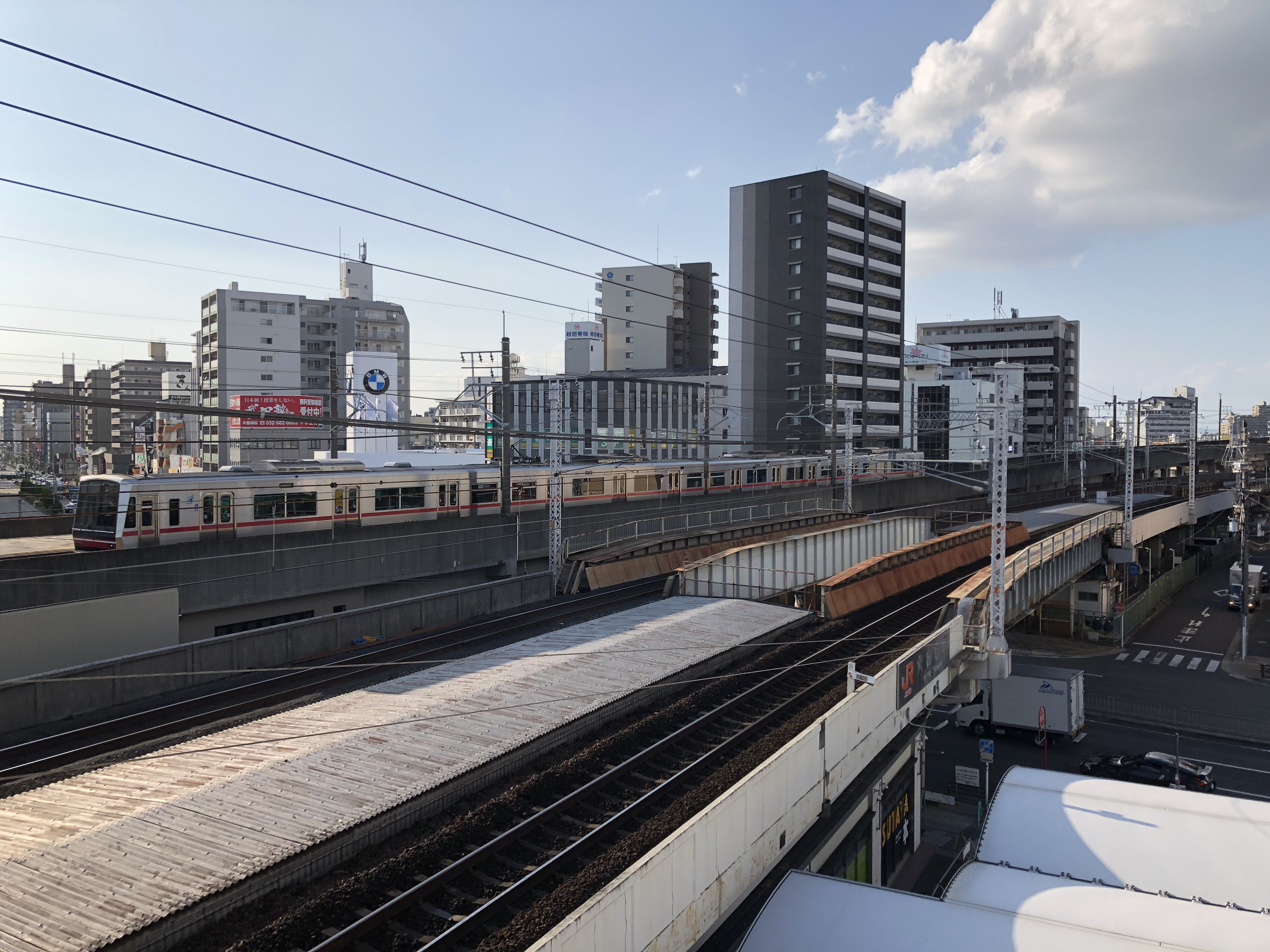
- Ōzone Station

General information
- Location: Nagoya, Aichi Prefecture; Japan
- System: JR Central and Nagoya Municipal Subway station
- Operator: Transportation Bureau City of Nagoya; JR Central; Nagoya Railroad; Nagoya Guideway Bus
- Lines: Meijō Line; Chūō Main Line; Meitetsu Seto Line; Yutorīto Line
- Connections: Bus terminal

Other information
- Station code: CF04 (JR); ST06 (Meitetsu); M12 (Nagoya Municipal Subway)

History
- Opened: 1 March 1906; 120 years ago (Meitetsu); 9 April 1911; 115 years ago (JR); 20 December 1971; 54 years ago (Nagoya Municipal Subway); 23 March 2001; 25 years ago (Yutorīto Line)

Services
| Preceding station | Nagoya Municipal Subway | Following station |
|---|---|---|
| Heian-dōri M11 anticlockwise | Meijō Line | Nagoya Dome-mae Yada M13 clockwise |
| Preceding station | JR Central | Following station |
| Chikusa CF03 towards Nagoya | Chūō Main Line Local | Shin-Moriyama CF05 towards Shiojiri |
| Chikusa CF03 towards Nagoya | Chūō Main Line Rapid | Kachigawa CF06 towards Shiojiri |
| Chikusa CF03 towards Nagoya | Chūō Main Line Home Liner | Tajimi CF12 towards Shiojiri |
| Preceding station | Meitetsu | Following station |
| Morishita towards Sakaemachi | Seto Line Local | Yada towards Owari Seto |
| Higashi Ōte towards Sakaemachi | Seto Line Semi Express Express | Obata towards Owari Seto |
Location

Ōzone Station (大曽根駅, Ōzone-eki) is a railway station in Kita-ku, Nagoya, Aichi Prefecture, Japan. It is the largest transport hub in Northeastern Nagoya, connecting the JR Chuo Line, Meitetsu Seto Line, Meijo Subway Line, and Yutorito Nagoya guideway bus line. There are no internal connecting passages between the different lines which share the station, so it is necessary to exit the ticket gate and move between them outside. Daily passenger numbers exceed 100,000.

== History ==
The Chuo Railway (Chuo Line) was planned in the late 1880s, with the Tajima to Nagoya section of the line opened in 1900. A station was built in Chikusa, but there were no plans for a station in Ōzone. Fearing that they would miss out on commercial opportunities, the local community started a campaign to establish an Ōzone station. They negotiated with the railway, deciding the provision of land for the station, and needed embankment work. As part of the negotiations, JR demanded that a private railway line be built linking Ōzone with Seto. The Seto line section from Seto to Yada opened in 1905, with the Yada to Ōzone section opening the year after in 1906. Work then began on the Japan National Railway (JNR) line to Ōzone, which was opened in 1911.

On 7 April 1945, a bombing raid was carried out on Ōzone by 160 American B29 Bombers. The main target was the Mitsubishi Motors factory, and other factories south of the station, but Ōzone station was also destroyed in the bombing. Just before the bombing destroyed the station, there were some 100 passengers waiting in the platforms. A decision was made to send them on a special unscheduled train to Katsukawa. The train arrived safely, and all passengers were unhurt. During the bombing of the station, an air-raid shelter sheltering the 37 station attendants suffered a direct hit, and 30 of the 37 attendants were killed. A memorial monument to the 30 station attendants who were killed is located outside the South East exit of Ōzone station.

== Lines ==
- Nagoya Municipal Subway
  - Meijō Line (Station number: M12)
- Central Japan Railway Company
  - Chūō Main Line
- Nagoya Railroad
  - Meitetsu Seto Line
- Nagoya Guideway Bus
  - Yutorīto Line (Station number: Y01)

== Layout ==
=== Nagoya Municipal Subway ===
The Meijō subway line is an underground station with 2 ticket gates and 6 exits. It has a single island-style platform with two tracks.

==== Platforms ====
| 1 | ■ Meijō Line | For Sakae and Kanayama |
| 2 | ■ Meijō Line | For Motoyama and Yagoto |

=== JR Central ===
The JR station has an island style platform serving two tracks. The ticket gate is quite a distance from the platform itself.

==== Platforms ====
| 1 | ■ Chūō Main Line | For Kōzōji, Tajimi, Nakatsugawa, and Nagano |
| 2 | ■ Chūō Main Line | For Chikusa, Kanayama, and Nagoya |

=== Nagoya Railroad ===
The Meitetsu station is an elevated station with only one exit. It features an elevated platform serving two tracks.

==== Platforms ====
| 1 | ■ Meitetsu Seto Line | For Owari Seto |
| 2 | ■ Meitetsu Seto Line | For Sakaemachi |

=== Nagoya Guideway Bus ===
The Nagoya Guideway bus features a setup similar to a train station, as the buses run on a dedicated elevated roadway with no traffic lights allowing rapid travel. The station is built over three overground levels with the second floor being the concourse, and the third floor featuring two platforms.

==== Platforms ====
| 1 | ■ Yutorīto Line | For Obata Ryokuchi |
| 2 | ■ Yutorīto Line | Alight only |

Nagoya Municipal Subway

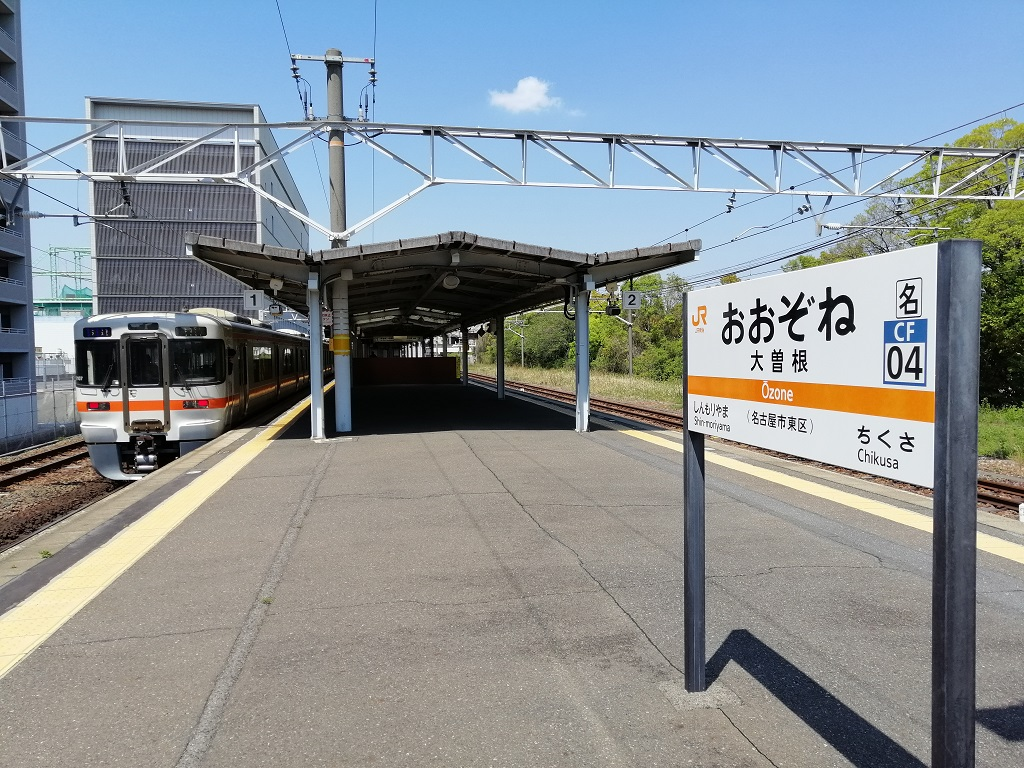
JR Central

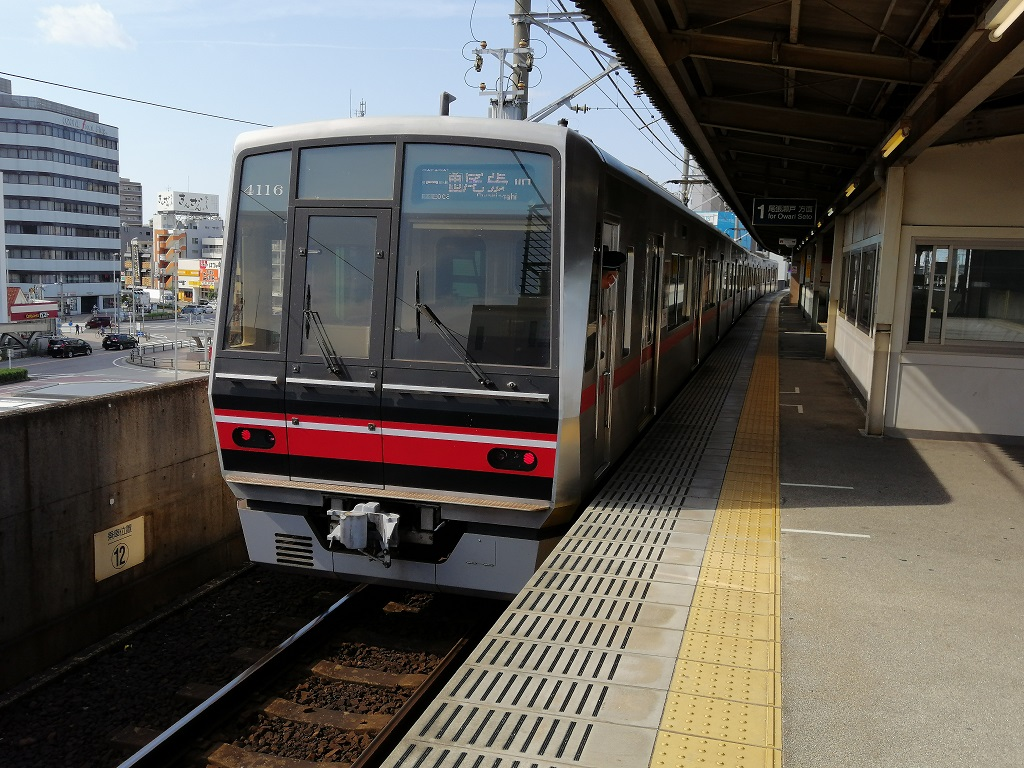
Nagoya Railroad

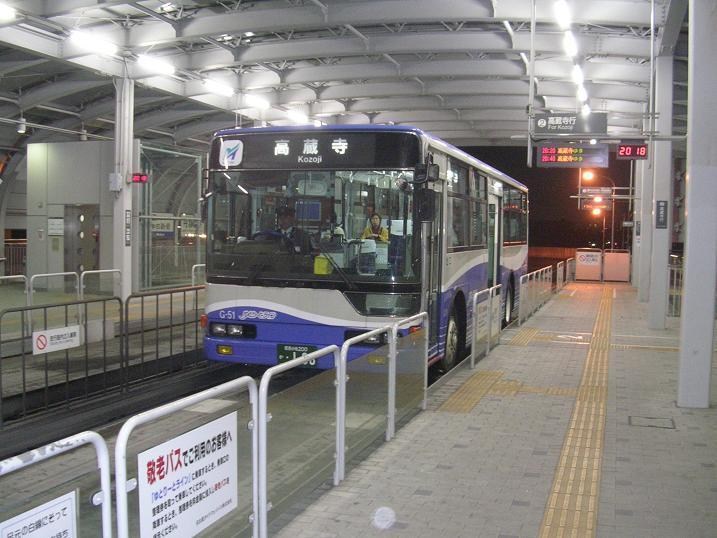
Nagoya Guideway Bus

== Adjacent stations ==
| « | Service | » |
Nagoya Guideway Bus
Yutorīto Line
| Terminus | - | Nagoya Dome-mae Yada |
