= Sakaemachi Station (Aichi) =

Railway station in Nagoya, Japan

Sakaemachi Station 栄町駅

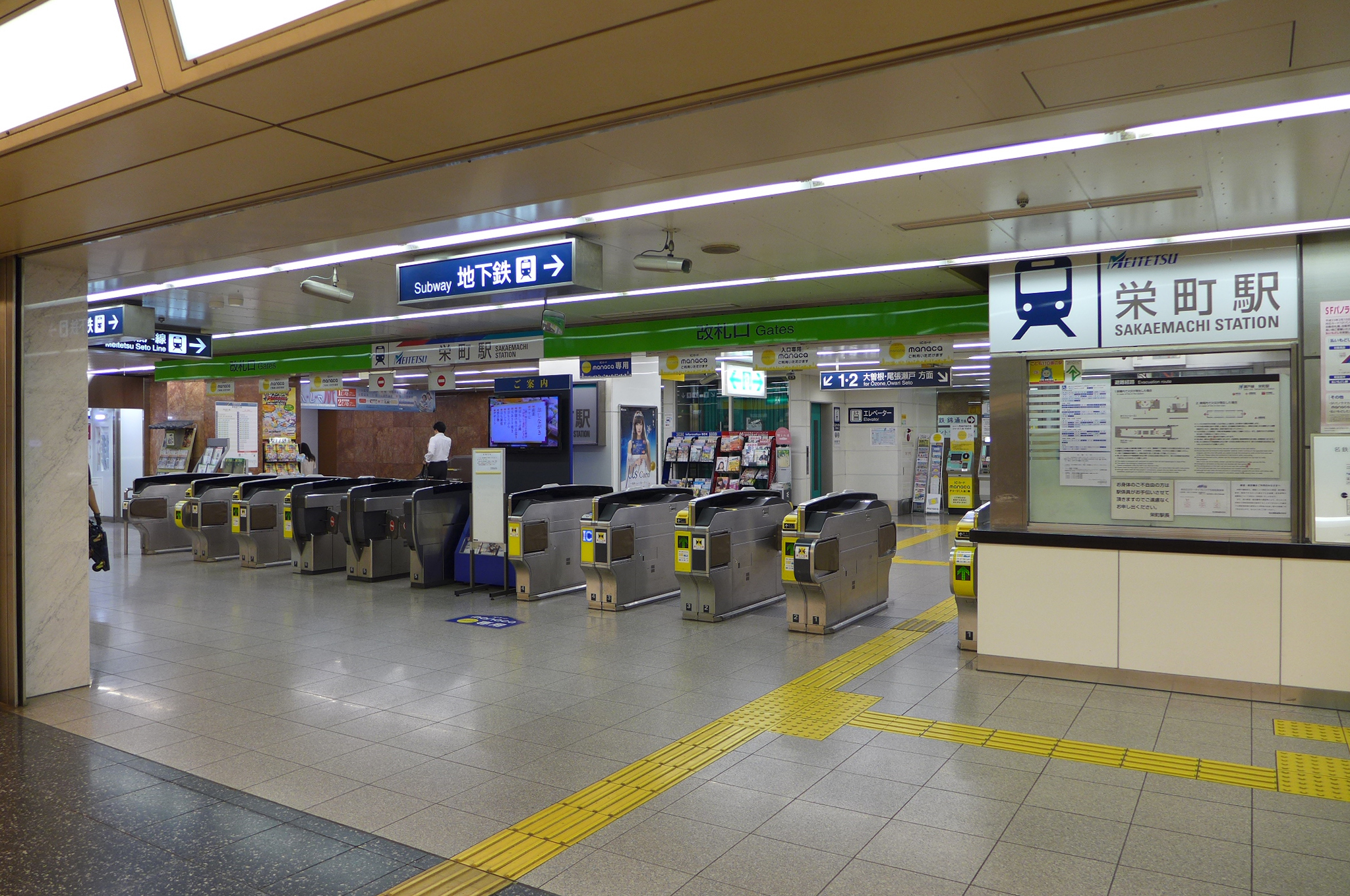
- Sakaemachi Station in July 2014

General information
- Location: Higashi-Sakura 1-12, Higashi-ku, Nagoya-shi, Aichi-ken 461-0005; Japan
- Coordinates: 35.1706°N 136.909°E
- Operator: Meitetsu
- Line: ■ Meitetsu Seto Line
- Distance: 20.6 kilometers from Owari Seto
- Platforms: 1 island platforms

Other information
- Status: Staffed
- Station code: ST01
- Website: Official website

History
- Opened: August 20, 1978

Passengers
- FY2017: 20,623

Services
Preceding station	Meitetsu	Following station
Terminus	Seto Line	Higashiōte towards Owari Seto
Location
- Location within Aichi Prefecture Location within Japan

Sakaemachi Station (栄町駅, Sakaemachi-eki) is a railway station in Higashi-ku, Nagoya, Aichi Prefecture, Japan, operated by Meitetsu.

The station is connected underground with multiple Nagoya Municipal Subway stations, namely Sakae and Hisaya-ōdōri Station.

== Lines ==
Sakaemachi Station is a terminus of the Meitetsu Seto Line, and is located 20.6 kilometers from opposing terminus of the line at Owari Seto.

== Station layout ==
The station has one dead-headed underground island platform. The station has automated ticket machines which dispense manaca IC cards, automated turnstiles, and is staffed.

== Station history ==
Sakaemachi Station was opened on August 20, 1978. On December 16, 2006, the Tranpass system of magnetic fare cards with automatic turnstiles was implemented, later transitioning to manaca smart cards.

== Passenger statistics ==
In fiscal year 2017, the station was used by an average of 20,623 passengers daily.

== See also ==
- List of railway stations in Japan
