= Owari Seto Station =

Railway station in Seto, Aichi Prefecture, Japan

Owari Seto Station 尾張瀬戸駅

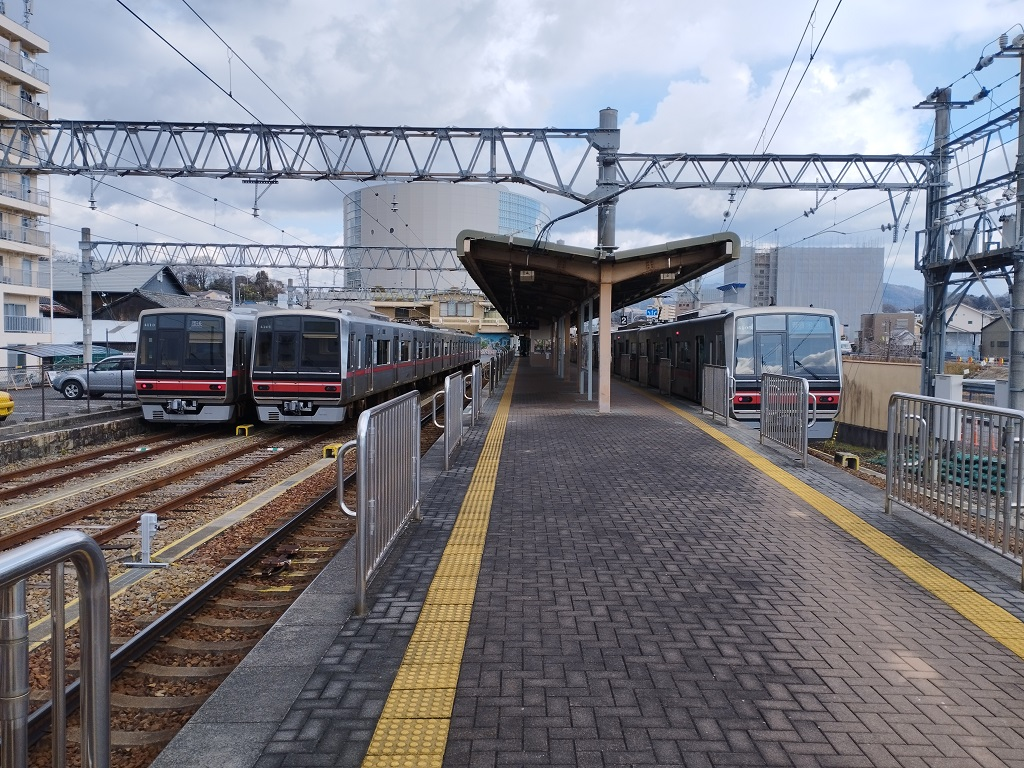
- Platform in December 2022

General information
- Location: 12-1 Yamawakichō, Seto-shi, Aichi-ken 489-0811; Japan
- Coordinates: 35.225°N 137.097°E
- Operator: Meitetsu
- Line: ■ Meitetsu Seto Line
- Distance: 20.6 kilometers from Sakaemachi
- Platforms: 2 side platforms
- Connections: Aichi Loop Line (via Setoshi Station)

Other information
- Status: Staffed
- Station code: ST20
- Website: Official website

History
- Opened: April 2, 1905
- Former names: Seto (瀬戸) (until 1921)

Passengers
- FY2017: 4423 daily

Services
Preceding station	Meitetsu	Following station
Seto-Shiyakusho-mae towards Sakaemachi	Seto Line	Terminus
Location
- Location within Aichi Prefecture Location within Japan

Track Layout

Owari Seto Station (尾張瀬戸駅, Owari Seto-eki) is a railway station in the city of Seto, Aichi Prefecture, Japan, operated by Meitetsu.

== Lines ==
Owari Seto Station is a terminal station on the Meitetsu Seto Line, and is located 20.6 kilometers from the opposing terminus of the line at Sakaemachi.

== Station layout ==
The station has a single island platform. The station has automated ticket machines, Manaca automated turnstiles and is staffed.

== Station history ==
Owari Seto Station was opened on April 2, 1905, as Seto Station (瀬戸駅, Seto-eki) on the privately operated Seto Electric Railway. It was renamed to its present name on February 19, 1921. The Seto Electric Railway was absorbed into the Meitetsu group on September 1, 1939. A new station building was completed in April 2001.

== Passenger statistics ==
In fiscal 2017, the station was used by an average of 4423 passengers daily.

== Surrounding area ==
- Seto City Art Museum

== See also ==
- List of railway stations in Japan
