= Shishamo (band) =

Japanese rock band

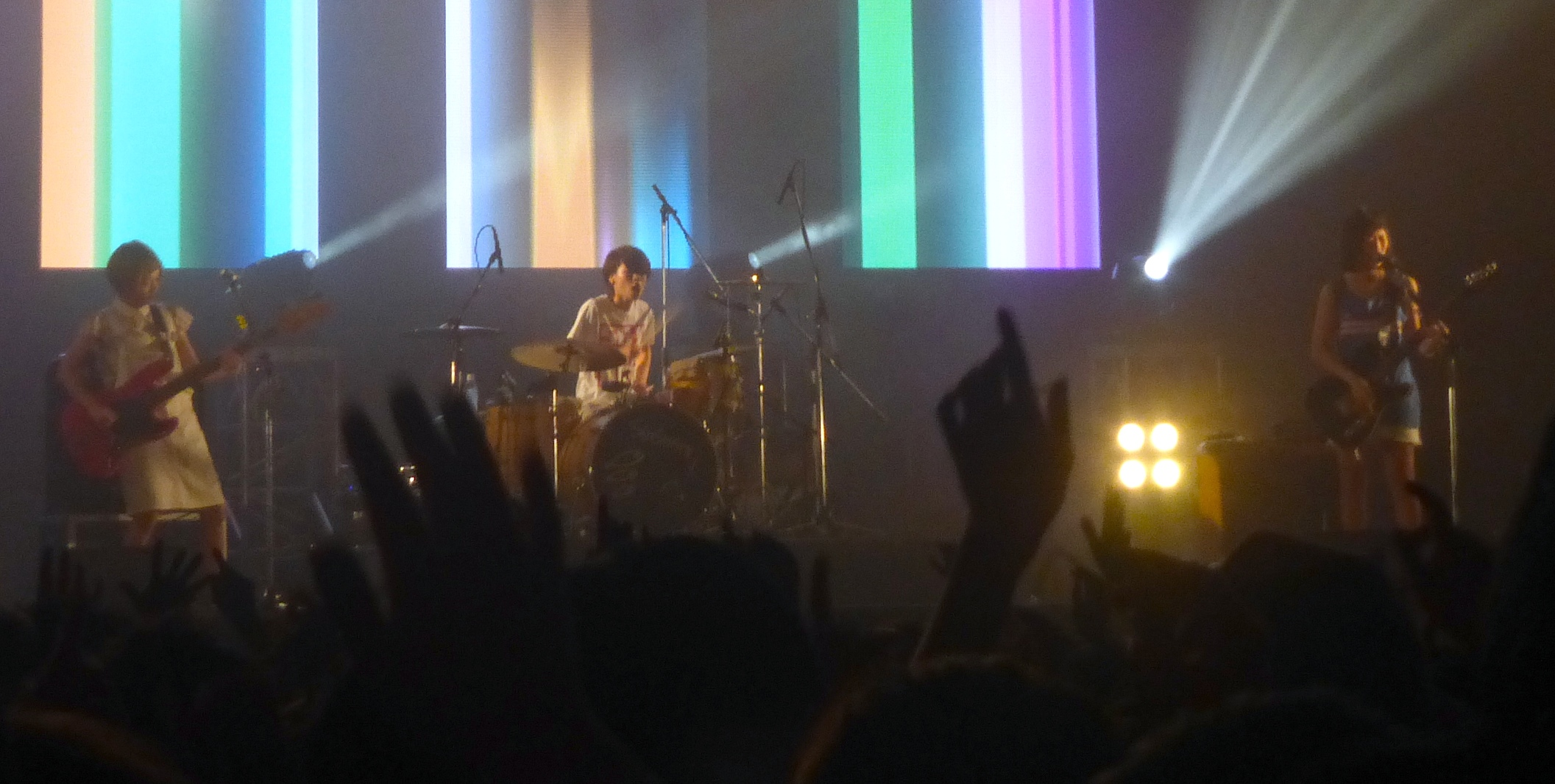
- Performing at the Tokyo Summer Sonic Festival in 2015

Background information
- Origin: Kanagawa Prefecture, Japan
- Genres: Rock, pop rock
- Years active: 2010–2026
- Label: Good Creators Records
- Past members: Asako Miyazaki; Aya Matsumoto; Misaki Yoshikawa; Aya Matsuoka
- Website: shishamo.biz

Shishamo (stylised as SHISHAMO) was a Japanese band. Formed in 2010 while at high school in Kawasaki, Kanagawa, the band began releasing music in 2012.

== Biography ==
Shishamo formed in early 2010, after the original three members attended the light music club during their first year of high school at Kawasaki City High School for Science and Technology. Asako Miyazaki and Aya Matsumoto had been childhood friends, but Misaki Yoshikawa met the others for the first time at high school. The band named themselves after shishamo, a type of small fish commonly eaten in Japan, however they originally spelled their name in kanji, 柳葉魚. The band's name was chosen by Miyazaki's older sister, who thought that it was a cute-sounding word with a cool-looking kanji.

Initially, the band did not expect to continue past graduation. At Yoshikawa's encouragement, however, the band turned professional. Despite this, Matsumoto was determined to quit once she turned 20. In 2011 they started writing original music. In May, the band competed at the Teens Rock in Hitachinaka music contest, where they won the grand prize and the best vocalist award. After this, the band decided to spell their band name "SHISHAMO" in Latin script as the kanji proved too difficult to read. The band released their debut CD in October with "Shukudai ga Owaranai", a single exclusively sold at Tower Records. At the same time, the band members became radio personalities for All Night Nippon R. In January 2013, they released Sotsugyō Seisaku, a compilation of their songs recorded while at high school, and toured Japan in March.

In Spring 2013, after graduating high school, the band members began devoting their time fully to the band, releasing their debut album Shishamo in November. On December 6, 2013, the band held their first solo concert at the Shibuya WWW in Tokyo. After performing their second national tour "Kanojo ga Dekita Bandman ni Koi Suru Kyūjitsu" in May, the band performed at nine summer festivals across Japan, and released the single "Kimi to NatsuFes".

As Mastumoto planned to leave Shishamo, the band was in need of a replacement bassist. Shishamo came into contact with Aya Matsuoka while in Osaka to perform at the Rush Ball music festival, where she happened to be working as part of her vocational school training. Miyazaki invited Matsuoka to try out for Shishamo once she discovered that Matsuoka had played bass in her high school's light music club.

On September 11, 2014, the band announced that Matsumoto was leaving Shishamo and was being replaced by Matsuoka. The band then released the single "Ryōsangata Kareshi" on October 1. Matsuoka made her first appearance with Shishamo in the accompanying music video before making her live debut at the band's concert in Chiba on October 4. "Ryōsangata Kareshi", described as having a "catchy pop sound" resembling Chatmonchy and Aiko, reached 19 on the Billboard Japan Top Singles Sales chart.

In February 2017, Shishamo released their fourth studio album, Shishamo 4. The album reached a peak position of seven on both the Billboard Japan Hot Albums and Top Album Sales charts. One of its singles, "Ashita Mo", was used in a television commercial by NTT Docomo that same year. The single was certified platinum by the RIAJ in 2019 and later became Shishamo's first song to reach 100 million streams, doing so in 2025.

October 2017 saw the release of the romantic comedy film Mixed Doubles, which featured two songs by Shishamo, titled "Hora, Waratteru" and "Saboten". Miyazaki wrote both songs specifically for the movie, with its story and one of its main characters in mind. At the end of year, Shishamo made their debut on the annual NHK program, Kōhaku Uta Gassen.

In December 2021, Shishamo released their first concept EP, titled Boots wo Narashite. The record, released digitally, contained three songs, each written by a different member of the group, as well as one instrumental track. To commemorate the release, Shishamo held a special broadcast on their YouTube channel later that month.

In January 2024, Shishamo began their first acoustic tour, showcasing the material released the prior year on their Acoustic Shishamo album. The tour had stops at Billboard Live venues in Yokohama, Osaka and twice in Tokyo, with the band playing two concerts on each date. Miyazaki and Matsuoka commented that the acoustic arrangements required playing instruments they didn't usually play while Yoshikawa mentioned that she had to contribute more towards the songs' melodies.

Later that year, in April, Shishamo released their first studio album in three years, Shishamo 8. Miyazaki explained that the sound achieved on the record was something the band had been working on since their previous album, trying to expand what they could achieve as a three-piece. She cited one of the album's singles, "Saikō Sokudo", as representative of their current sound. Written the previous year for a series of boat racing advertisements, the single demonstrated the band's ability to write more than romance-themed songs.

Shishamo 8 reached a top position of 27 on the Billboard Japan Download Albums chart. Rockin'On noted that the album had the sound of a matured rock band. To promote the record, the band went on the "Taikutsu na Happy End ni Mayoikonda no wa Kimi no Sei da" tour starting in June with stops at each Zepp concert venue in the country, as well a date in Taipei.

In July, Yoshikawa announced via social media that she had entered into a partnership oath with her girlfriend. That October, the Nippon Television drama Divorce Lawyer Spider started airing. The drama's main theme song, the Tokyo Ska Paradise Orchestra track "Oshiete Ouroboros", featured Miyazaki as a guest vocalist. At the end of the year, the band played their first concert in South Korea.

Shishamo provided the opening theme for the anime adaptation of Flower and Asura, which premiered in January 2025. Regarding the song, titled "Jibun Kakumei", Miyazaki explained that she wrote the track with the story in mind and hoped that it would help listeners to have the courage to change themselves like the main character.

In September 2025, Shishamo announced that, following two concerts at the Uvance Todoroki Stadium by Fujitsu in Kawasaki on June 13 and 14, 2026, they would disband.

On February 11, 2026, Shishamo released the compilation album Shishamo Deshita!!! Containing three discs of their previously released songs, each disc's tracklist was selected by a different member of the group. The album entered the Billboard Top Album Sales Chart at number eight, its peak position. That same day, Shishamo played at the Kawasaki Sports and Culture Center, kicking off their final tour, "Sayonara Voyage!!!".

== Members ==
- Asako Miyazaki (宮崎朝子, Miyazaki Asako) is the band's vocalist and guitarist, as well as the primary songwriter.
- Misaki Yoshikawa (吉川美冴貴, Yoshikawa Misaki) is the band's drummer and considered the band leader by the members.
- Aya Matsuoka (松岡彩, Matsuoka Aya) is the band's bassist. Originally from Osaka, she joined the band on September 11, 2014, replacing original member Aya Matsumoto.

=== Former members ===
- Aya Matsumoto (松本彩, Matsumoto Aya) was a founding member of the band, and the band's former bassist. After declaring that she would leave the band when she turned 20, she left the band on September 11, 2014.

== Discography ==
Shishamo discography
- Studio albums: 8
- Singles: 14

=== Studio albums ===
List of albums, with selected chart positions
Title	Album details	Peak positions	Sales (JPN) (Note: Sales provided by Oricon database and are rounded to the nearest thousand copies.)
Title	Album details	JPN Oricon	Sales (JPN)
Sotsugyō Seisaku (卒業制作; "Graduation Project")	Released: January 23, 2013 (JPN); Label: Good Creators Records; Formats: CD, digital download	94	2,000
Shishamo	Released: November 13, 2013 (JPN); Label: Good Creators; Formats: CD, digital download	34	5,000
Shishamo 2	Released: March 4, 2015 (JPN); Label: Good Creators; Formats: CD, digital download	17	10,000
Shishamo 3	Released: March 2, 2016 (JPN); Label: Good Creators; Formats: CD, digital download	7	10,000
Shishamo 4	Released: February 22, 2017 (JPN); Label: Good Creators; Formats: CD, digital download	8	35,000
Shishamo 5	Released: June 20, 2018 (JPN); Label: Good Creators; Formats: CD, digital download	3	15,000
Shishamo 6	Released: January 29, 2020 (JPN); Label: Universal Music Japan; Formats: CD, digital download	16	5,300
Shishamo 7	Released: June 30, 2021 (JPN); Label: Universal Music Japan; Formats: CD, digital download	15	4,000
Shishamo 8	Released: April 10, 2024 (JPN); Label: Universal Music Japan; Formats: CD, digital download	26	1,807

=== Singles ===
List of singles, with selected chart positions
Title	Year	Peak chart positions		Sales (JPN)	Album
Title	Year	JPN Oricon	JPN Billboard (Note: Sources for chart positions are as follows: "Boku ni Kanojo ga Dekita n da", "Kimi to NatsuFes", "Ryōsan-gata Kareshi", "Nettaiya", "Kimi to Gelände")	Sales (JPN)	Album
"Shukudai ga Owaranai" (宿題が終わらない; "The Homework Doesn't End")	2012	—	—	Limited	Sotsugyō Seisaku
"Kimi to NatsuFes" (君と夏フェス; "Summer Music Festival with You")	2014	21	16	5,000	Shishamo 2
"Ryōsangata Kareshi" (量産型彼氏; "Mass Produced Boyfriend")	2014	26	39	4,000	Shishamo 2
"Nettaiya" (熱帯夜; "Tropical Night")	2014	38	42	4,000	Shishamo 3
"Kimi to Gerende" (君とゲレンデ; "You and the Ski Slope")	2015	30	48	4,000	Shishamo 3
"Natsu no Koibito" (夏の恋人; "Summer Lover")	2016	23	46	5,000	Shishamo 4
"Bye Bye" (バイバイ; BYE BYE)	2017	22	71	5,000	Shishamo 5
"Hora, Waratteru" (ほら、笑ってる; "Come on, Smile")	2017	27	84	5,000	Shishamo 5
"Mizuiro no Hibi" (水色の日々; "Light blue days")	2018	26	15	4,500	Shishamo 5
"Oh!"	2019	31	24	2,100	Non-album single
"Kimi no Tonari ni Itaikara" (君の隣にいたいから; "I want to be next to you")	2019	26	—	1,887	Shishamo 6
"—" denotes a recording that did not chart or was not released in that territory.

=== Promotional singles ===
Title	Year	Peak chart positions	Album
Title	Year	Japan Billboard	Album
"Boku ni Kanojo ga Dekita n da" (僕に彼女ができたんだ; "I Got a Girlfriend")	2013	47	Shishamo
"Boku, Jitsu wa" (僕、実は; "Actually, I")	2015	—	Shishamo 2
"Nakaniwa no Shōjo-tachi" (中庭の少女たち; "Girls in the Courtyard")	2016	— (Note: Charted at number 49 on the Radio Songs sub-chart.)	Shishamo 3
"—" denotes a recording that did not chart or was not released in that territory.
