= Owari Asahi Station =

Railway station in Owariasahi, Aichi Prefecture, Japan

Owari Asahi Station 尾張旭駅

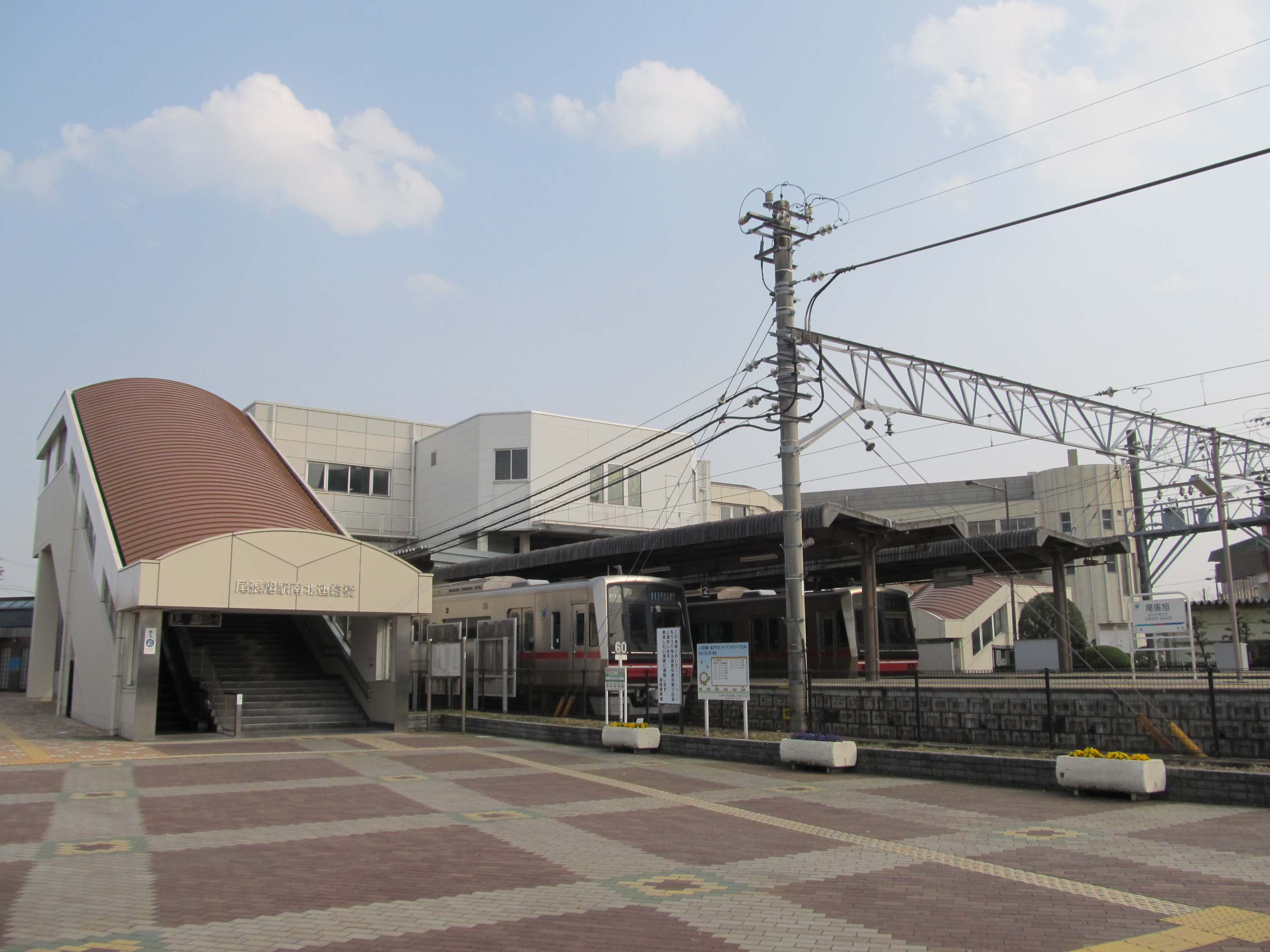
- Owari Asahi Station in March 2015

General information
- Location: Harata-2591-3 Higashidaidōchō, Owariasahi-shi, Aichi-ken 488-0801; Japan
- Coordinates: 35.2169°N 137.036°E
- Operator: Meitetsu
- Line: ■ Meitetsu Seto Line
- Distance: 14.7 kilometers from Sakaemachi
- Platforms: 2 island platforms

Other information
- Status: Staffed
- Station code: ST15
- Website: Official website

History
- Opened: April 2, 1905
- Former names: Arai (to 1922); Asahi-Arai (until 1971)

Passengers
- FY2017: 7,796

Services
Preceding station	Meitetsu	Following station
Asahi-mae towards Sakaemachi	Seto Line Local	Sangō towards Owari Seto
Asahi-mae towards Sakaemachi	Seto Line Semi Express	Sangō towards Owari Seto
Ōmori-Kinjōgakuin-mae towards Sakaemachi	Seto Line Express	Sangō towards Owari Seto
Location
- Location within Aichi Prefecture Location within Japan

Track Layout

Owari Asahi Station (尾張旭駅, Owari Asahi-eki) is a railway station in the city of Owariasahi, Aichi Prefecture, Japan, operated by Meitetsu.

== Lines ==
Owari Asahi Station is served by the Meitetsu Seto Line, and is located 14.7 kilometers from the starting point of the line at Sakaemachi.

== Station layout ==
The station has two island platforms connected by an elevated station building. The station has automated ticket machines, Manaca automated turnstiles and is staffed.

=== Platforms ===
1	■ Meitetsu Seto Line	For Owari Seto
2	■ Meitetsu Seto Line	(arriving trains only)
3, 4	■ Meitetsu Seto Line	For Sakaemachi

== Station history ==
Owari Asahi Station was opened on April 2, 1905, as Arai Station (新居駅, Arai-eki) on the privately operated Seto Electric Railway. Its changed its name to Asahi-Arai Station (旭新居駅, Asahi-Arai-eki) on February 24, 1922. The Seto Electric Railway was absorbed into the Meitetsu group on September 1, 1939. The station was renamed to its present name on November 1, 1971. The station was relocated to its present location, and new station building was completed in July 1994.

== Passenger statistics ==
In fiscal 2017, the station was used by an average of 7,796 passengers daily.

== Surrounding area ==
- Nagoya Sangyo University
- Owariasahi City Hall
- Meitetsu Owari Asahi Rail Yard

== See also ==
- List of railway stations in Japan
