= Healthcare proxy =

Legal instrument for healthcare decisions

In the field of medicine, a healthcare proxy (commonly referred to as HCP) is a document (legal instrument) with which a patient (primary individual) appoints an agent to legally make healthcare decisions on behalf of the patient, when the patient is incapable of making and executing the healthcare decisions stipulated in the proxy. Once the healthcare proxy is effective, the agent continues making healthcare decisions as long as the primary individual is legally competent to decide. Moreover, in legal-administrative functions, the healthcare proxy is a legal instrument akin to a "springing" healthcare power of attorney. The proxy must declare the healthcare agent who will gain durable power attorney. This document also notifies of the authority given from the principal to the agent and states the limitations of this authority.

Those over the age of 18 are allowed to have a healthcare proxy, and these documents are useful in situations that render a person unable to communicate their wishes such as being in a persistent vegetative state, having a form of dementia or an illness that takes away one's ability to effectively communicate, or being under anesthesia when a decision needs to be made. Healthcare proxies are one of three ways that surrogate decision makers are enacted, the other two being court orders and laws for the automatic succession of decision makers. In contrast to a living will, healthcare proxies do not set out possible outcomes with predetermined reactions, rather they appoint someone to carry out the wishes of an individual.

== History ==
The methods of healthcare planning and tools of advanced preparation have changed dramatically over the years. The concept of durable power of attorney arose in Virginia in 1954 for the purpose of setting property matters. This allowed for a continued existence of power of attorney following the original person losing capacity to carry out the necessary actions. This concept evolved over the years and in 1983, the President's Commission for the Study of Ethical Problems in Medicine and Biomedical and Behavioral Research addressed this idea as one of great potential in the healthcare industry. This commission also stated the possibility of abuse as a noted concern going forward. In response to this commission, there was an evolution of this concept throughout the 1980s and the 1990s that eventually led to all states in America having a healthcare power of attorney statute by 1997.

== Criteria ==
Some jurisdictions place limitations on the persons who can act as agents. (Some forbid the appointment of treating physicians as the healthcare proxy.) In any event the agent should be someone close to and trusted by the primary individual. According to the state of Massachusetts, no person who is an employee or administrator of a facility can be an agent unless it is for someone who is of familial relation to them. In any event, the agent is recommended to be someone close to and trusted by the primary individual. In the absence of a power of attorney, a legal guardian must be appointed.

=== Legal guidelines ===
Healthcare proxies are permitted in forty-nine states as well as the District of Columbia. Healthcare forms may differ in structure from state to state and pre-made forms are not compulsory as long as certain guidelines are met. The common guidelines include:

- Name and address of the agent.
- Name and address of an alternate agent.
- Duration of the proxy – not indicating a duration means it is valid unless stated otherwise.
- Special instructions – these can broaden or limit the powers of the agent. If the patient doesn't want to be on feeding tubes no matter what, this can be stated here. If there are certain treatments that the patient does not want to receive like dialysis or blood transfusion, then they must be indicated. However, if the patient wants to give the agent more flexibility with some or no restriction, this must be written.
- Name, date and signature of the primary individual.
- Instructions on tissue or organ donation.
- Two adult witnesses must sign the document stating that they have witnessed this agreement and that both parties appear to be sane. The witnesses must be 18 years or older. The agent and primary individual do not qualify as witnesses.
- Presence of a lawyer - such a person may help in drafting a document tailored to the needs of the primary individual.
- Once signed, copies of the form must be given to healthcare providers, the agent, spouse, and close friends. A copy should also be carried by the primary individual (in wallet or purse).

=== Powers and limitations ===
The agent is empowered when a qualified physician determines that the primary individual is unable to make decisions regarding healthcare. The agent may be granted the power to remove or sustain feeding tubes from the primary individual if these tubes are the only things that are keeping the primary individual alive. The agent's decision should draw upon knowledge of the patient's desire in this matter. If the primary individual made his or her wishes clear on the proxy form, then they must be followed despite any possible objections from the agent.

A person may identify end-of-life decisions in more than one legal document, such as in a living will in addition to a healthcare proxy, in which case it is necessary to examine all of the documents to determine if any limit or revoke the agent's authority as granted in the healthcare proxy. An agent will not be legally or financially liable for decisions made on behalf of the primary individual as long as they follow the terms of the healthcare proxy.

== Capacity to appoint ==
There are limited legal foundations to determine the ability of someone to appoint a healthcare proxy. Although physicians are allowed to deliver life-saving treatment in emergent situations, in non-emergencies, it is determined if the patient has the ability to then appoint a healthcare proxy. It is possible for a patient lacking the ability to make healthcare decisions, to still have the capacity to appoint an agent and have a proxy.

=== United Kingdom ===
In England and Wales, an independent mental health capacity advocate may be appointed under the Mental Capacity Act 2005; the provisions made in the same Act for a lasting power of attorney may also provide a satisfactory basis for providing care via an attorney, who does not require to be professionally qualified. Different arrangements apply elsewhere in the UK.

== See also ==
- Advance healthcare directive
- Doe ex. rel. Tarlow v. District of Columbia
- Do Not Resuscitate (DNR)
- Estate planning
- Living will
- Patient refusal of nutrition and hydration
- Power of attorney
- Right to Care card
- Ulysses pact
- Uniform Rights of the Terminally Ill Act
- Mental health law
