= Sangō Station (Aichi) =

Railway station in Owariasahi, Aichi Prefecture, Japan

Sangō Station 三郷駅

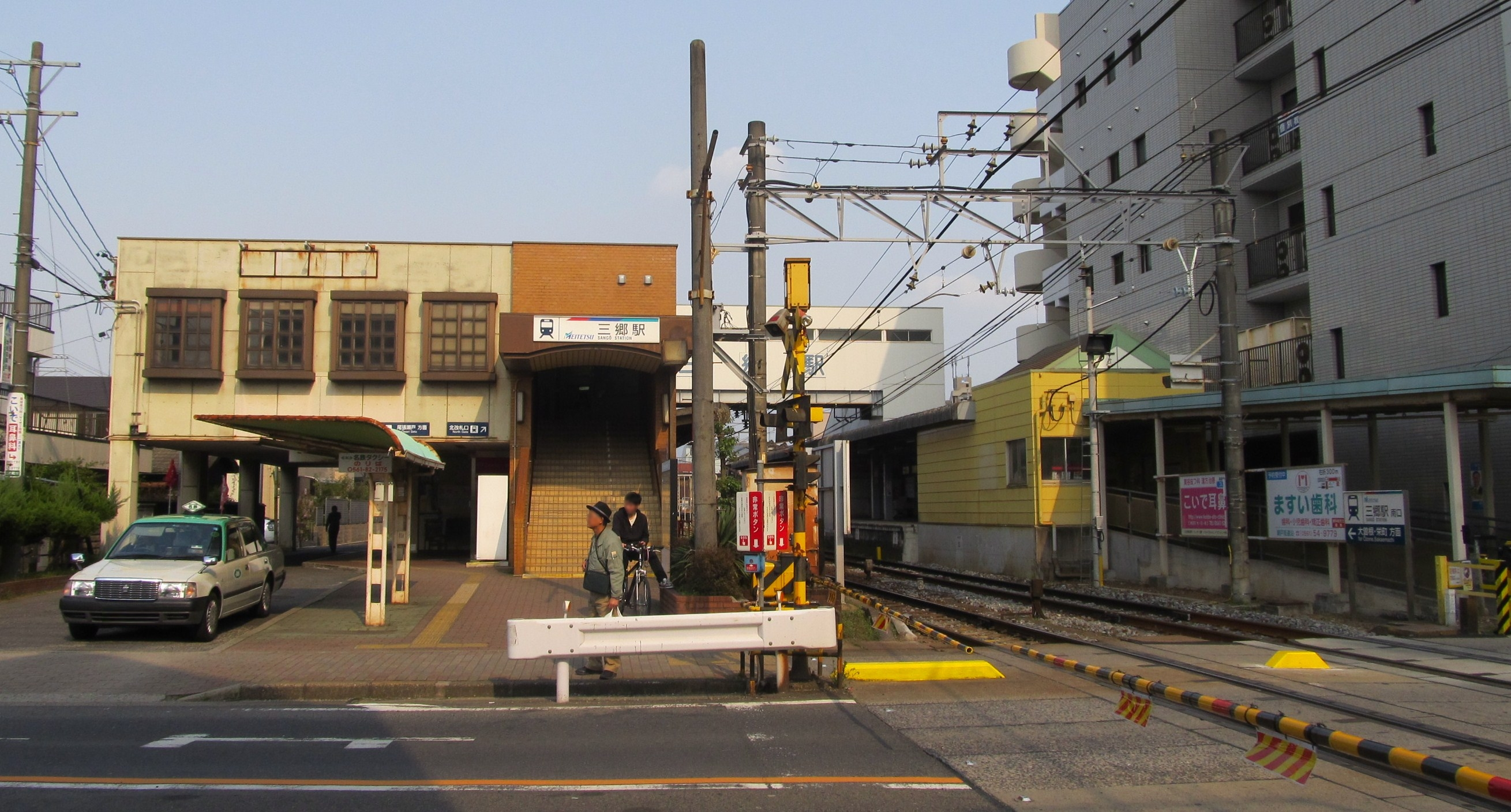
- Sangō Station in March 2015

General information
- Location: Sakae-92-1 Sangōchō, Owariasahi-shi, Aichi-ken 488-0015; Japan
- Coordinates: 35.2164°N 137.052°E
- Operator: Meitetsu
- Line: ■ Meitetsu Seto Line
- Distance: 16.1 kilometers from Sakaemachi
- Platforms: 2 side platforms

Other information
- Status: Staffed
- Station code: ST16
- Website: Official website

History
- Opened: April 2, 1905

Passengers
- FY2017: 10,012

Services
Preceding station	Meitetsu	Following station
Owari Asahi towards Sakaemachi	Seto Line	Mizuno towards Owari Seto
Location
- Location within Aichi Prefecture Location within Japan

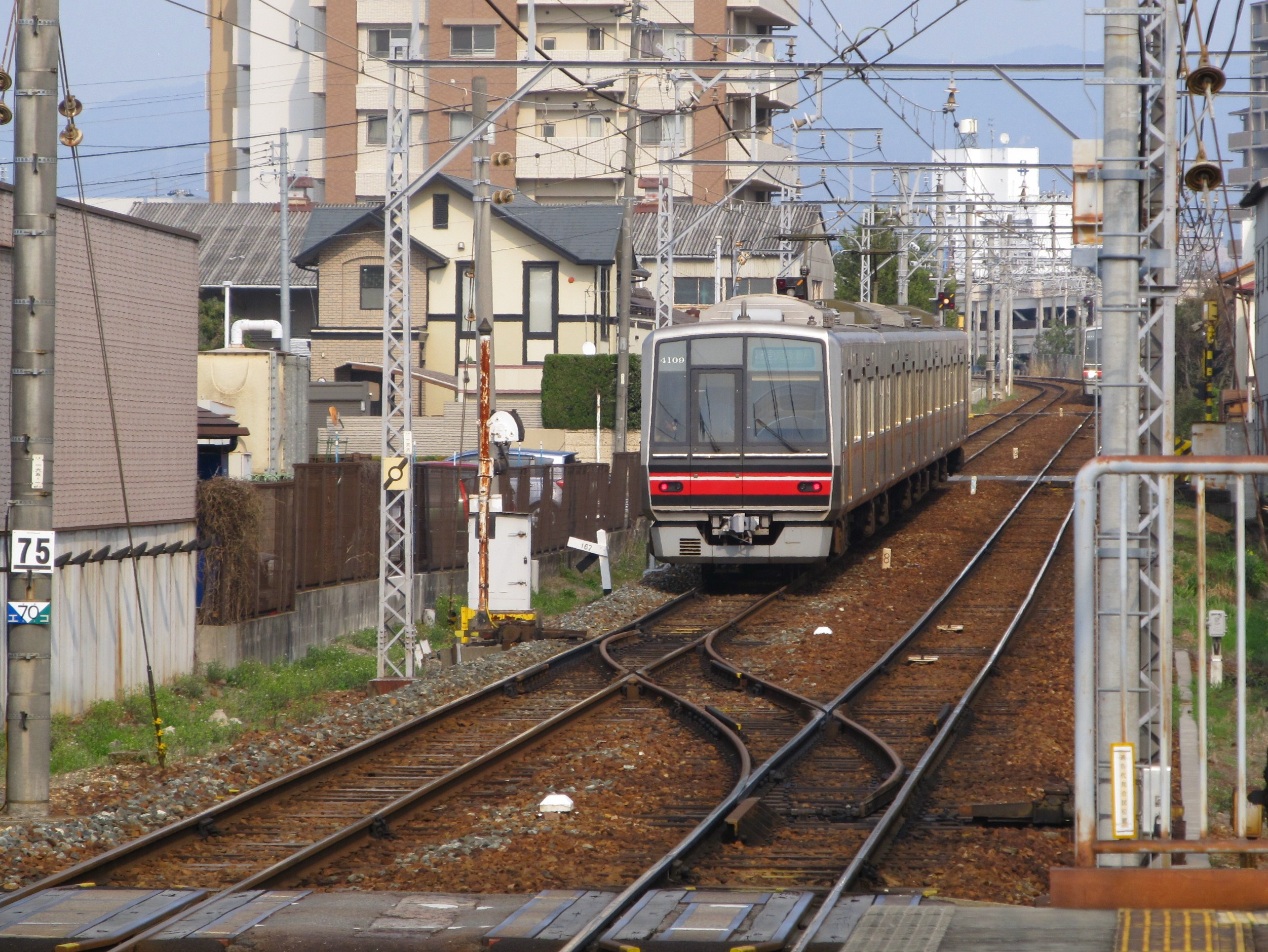
Crossover track at Sangō Station

Sangō Station (三郷駅, Sangō-eki) is a railway station in the city of Owariasahi, Aichi Prefecture, Japan, operated by Meitetsu.

== Lines ==
Sangō Station is served by the Meitetsu Seto Line, and is located 16.1 kilometers from the starting point of the line at Sakaemachi.

== Station layout ==
The station has two opposed side platforms connected by a footbridge. The station has automated ticket machines, Manaca automated turnstiles and is staffed.

=== Platforms ===
1	■ Meitetsu Seto Line	For Owari Seto
2	■ Meitetsu Seto Line	For Ōzone and Sakaemachi

== Station history ==
Sangō Station was opened on April 2, 1905, as a station on the privately operated Seto Electric Railway. The Seto Electric Railway was absorbed into the Meitetsu group on September 1, 1939.

== Passenger statistics ==
In fiscal 2017, the station was used by an average of 10,012 passengers daily.

== Surrounding area ==
- Owariasahi Higashi Junior High School

== See also ==
- List of railway stations in Japan
