= Aichiken Forest Park =

Forest park in Nagoya, Aichi, Japan

Coordinates: 35°14′6.56″N 137°3′8.04″E

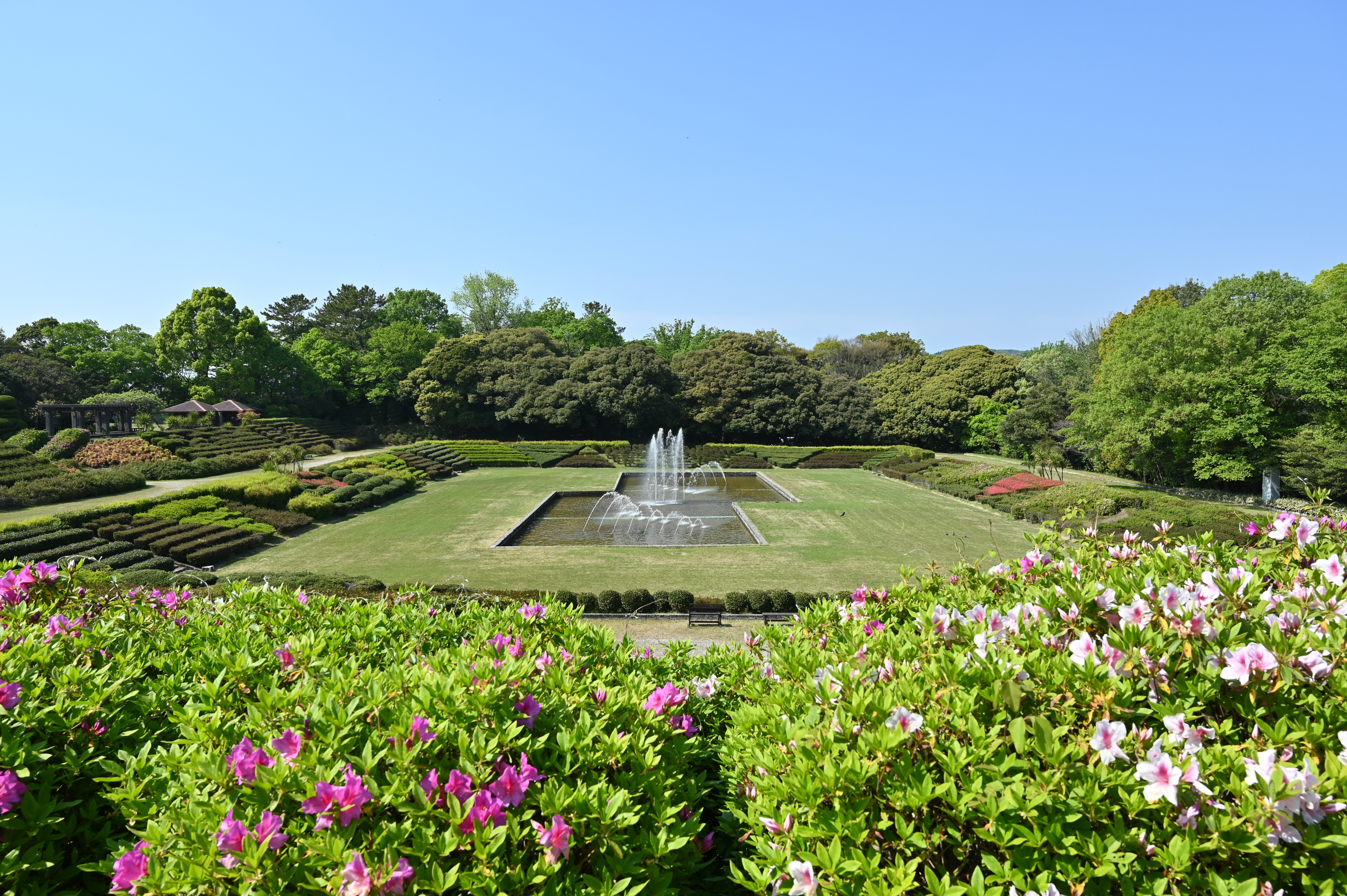
The fountain and flower garden in Aichiken Forest Park in Aichi, Japan

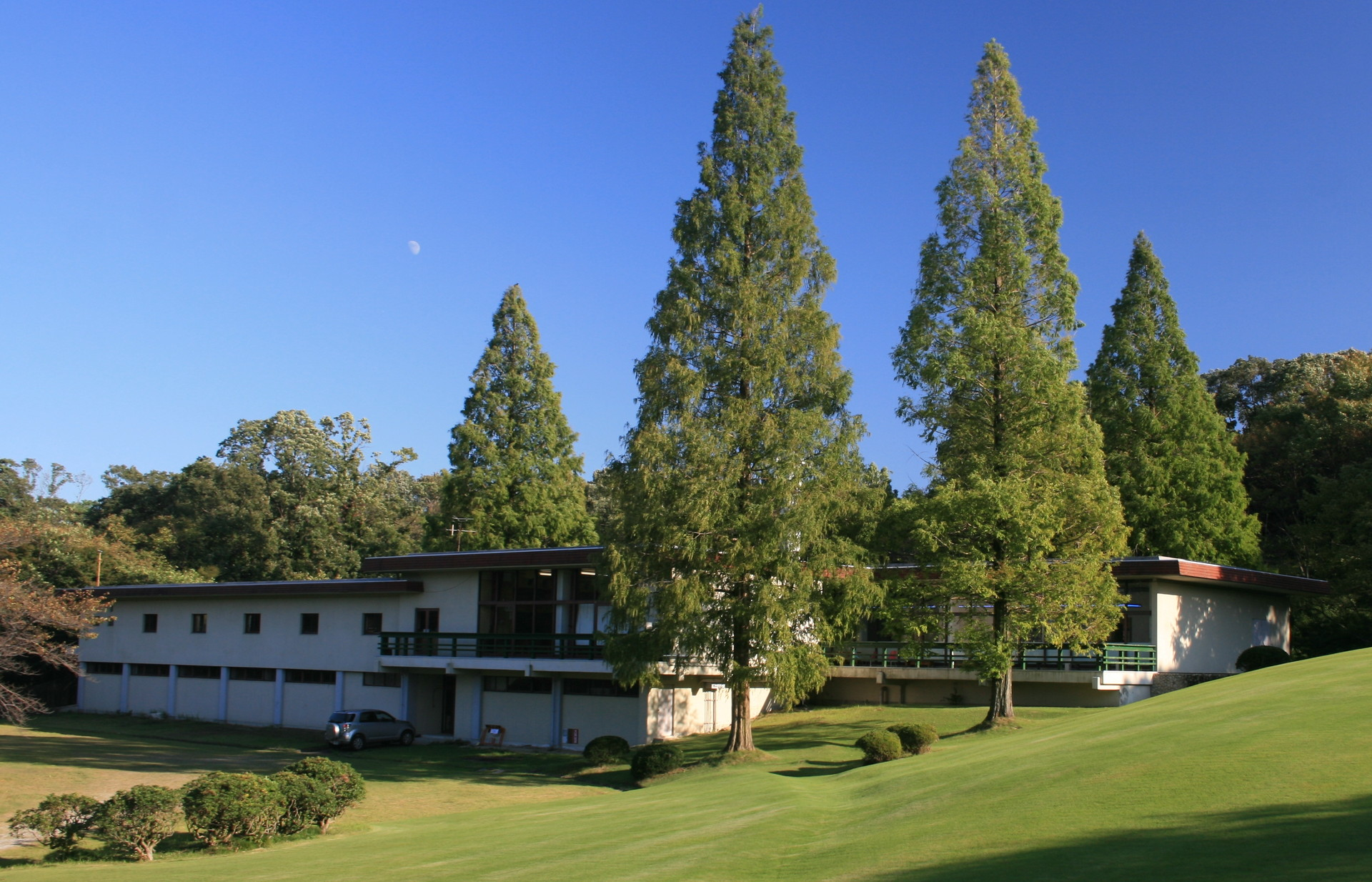
The exhibit hall surrounded by Metasequoia trees

Aichiken Forest Park (Japanese: 愛知県森林公園) is a forest park located in the area encompassing Owariasahi and Moriyama-ku, Nagoya, Aichi. In its vast forest of about 468 hectares, it also includes a botanical garden and various sports facilities, such as tennis courts, baseball and archery fields, a horse riding course, a golf course, and sports plazas.

The park opened in 1934 as Japan's first forest park.

== See also ==
- Forest park
