= Right to Care card =

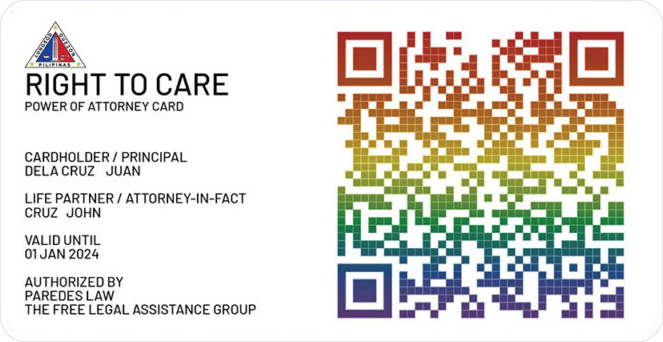
- Front side sample of the Quezon City card
- Type: Healthcare proxy / Power of attorney card
- First issued: 2023
- In circulation: Yes (in select local government units only)
- Valid in: select healthcare providers in some cities and provinces in the Philippines (see below)
- Eligibility: LGBTQ city residents with a partner (Note: Same-sex unions are not recognized at a national level in the Philippines)
- Rights: Ability to make medical decisions in behalf of one's designated partner.
- Website: www.facebook.com/RightToCareCard

The Right to Care card is a document issued by some municipal governments in the Philippines for LGBTQ couples who are city residents.

== History ==
The Right to Care card was first introduced by the Quezon City government. It was launched on June 24, 2023, by the Quezon City government under Mayor Joy Belmonte coinciding with Pride Month observance. The project is a partnership between the city government and MullenLowe Treyna. The idea to enable LGBTQ people to give their partner permission to make medical decisions in behalf of each other via a special power of attorney was conceived by MullenLowe Treyna associate creative director Adrian de Guzman back in 2020.

The implementation of the relevant program was launched in select hospitals under the Quezon City government such as the Quezon City General Hospital, Novaliches District Hospital, and Rosario Maaclang Bautista General Hospital. The city government intends to secure partnerships with privately run hospitals within the city. By June 2024, 800 couples have registered for Quezon City Right to Care Card and 78 couples have been issued with their cards.

It took two more years since the Quezon City's card's launch, for another local government unit to adopt a similar program. On June 13, 2025, San Juan in Metro Manila passed the City Ordinance No. 16 series of 2025, authorizing a Right to Care card for city residents.

Other cities, municipalities and provinces followed suit. Cavite is the first province to implement a similar measure when it passed Provincial Ordinance No. 532-2026 on April 20, 2026.

== Proposed nationwide implementation ==
The institutionalizing of a Right to Care system has been proposed in the Philippine Congress; both at the House of Representatives and the Senate level.

Senator Risa Hontiveros filed her version of the Right to Care Bill under Senate Bill No. 1985 in the Senate.

== Localities with Right to Care ordinances ==
=== Cities ===
City / municipality	Date	Enacting document	ID Card name	Ref.
Quezon City	June 24, 2023 – Launch; October 20, 2023 – Ordinance	City Ordinance No. 3221	Right to Care ID	
Laoag	July 1, 2024 – Ordinance; June 27, 2026 – Launch	City Ordinance No. 2024-017	Alikaka Card	
San Juan, Metro Manila	June 13, 2025	City Ordinance No. 16	Right to Care ID	
Dasmariñas	January 19, 2026	Ordinance No. 04-S-2026	Right to Care by Proxies Card for LGBTQIA+	
Iloilo City	March 25, 2026	Regulation Ordinance No. 2026-0093	Right to Care Card	
Parañaque	April 30, 2026	City ordinance	Right to Care Card	
Mandaluyong	May 26, 2026	City Ordinance No. 1048, s. 2026	Right to Care Card	
Biñan	June 8, 2026	City Ordinance No. 22-(2026)	Right to Care Card	
Carmona, Cavite	June 18, 2026	City Ordinance No. 2026-013	Right to Care Card	
Binangonan	July 20, 2026	Ordinance No. 019, s. 2026	Right to Care Card	
Danao, Cebu	July 21, 2026	Ordinance No. 2026-18-299	Right to Care Card	
Taytay, Rizal	October 6, 2026	Ordinance No. 2606-035	Right to Care Card	

Proposed Right to Care ordinances are currently pending before the city councils of Bacolod, Davao City, and Naga, Camarines Sur.

=== Provinces ===
Province	Date	Enacting document	ID Card name	Ref.
Cavite	April 20, 2026	Provincial Ordinance No. 532	CareCavite ID	
Cebu	June 1, 2026	Executive Order No. 29	Right to Care ID	
Ilocos Sur	June 25, 2026	Provincial Ordinance No. 0337-2026	Right to Care Card	
Laguna	June 29, 2026	Provincial ordinance	Right to Care Card	
Northern Samar	September 10, 2026	Provincial Ordinance No. 532-2026	Right to Care Card	

La Union has a proposed Right to Care ordinance currently pending before its Provincial Board.

== Benefits ==
Prior to the launch of the card, hospitals and other medical facilities only allow legal spouses or next of kin to make important medical decisions in behalf of an individual. This excludes same-sex partners from doing the same. They have to secure a special power of attorney (SPA).

The card could be availed through the Quezon City gender and development (GAD) office. It contains a QR code linking to the relevant notarized SPA.

Right to Care began as an initiative to protect LGBTQIA+ couples. But as different government levels began adopting the card, but some jurisdictions also cover other Filipinos in non-traditional relationship unrecognized by the law during medical emergencies:

- Solo parents
- Senior citizens
- Non-marital couples
- Persons with disabilities
- OFW families
- Estranged individuals

== See also ==
- Partnership oath in Japan
