= Ulysses and the Sirens (Waterhouse) =

Painting by John William Waterhouse

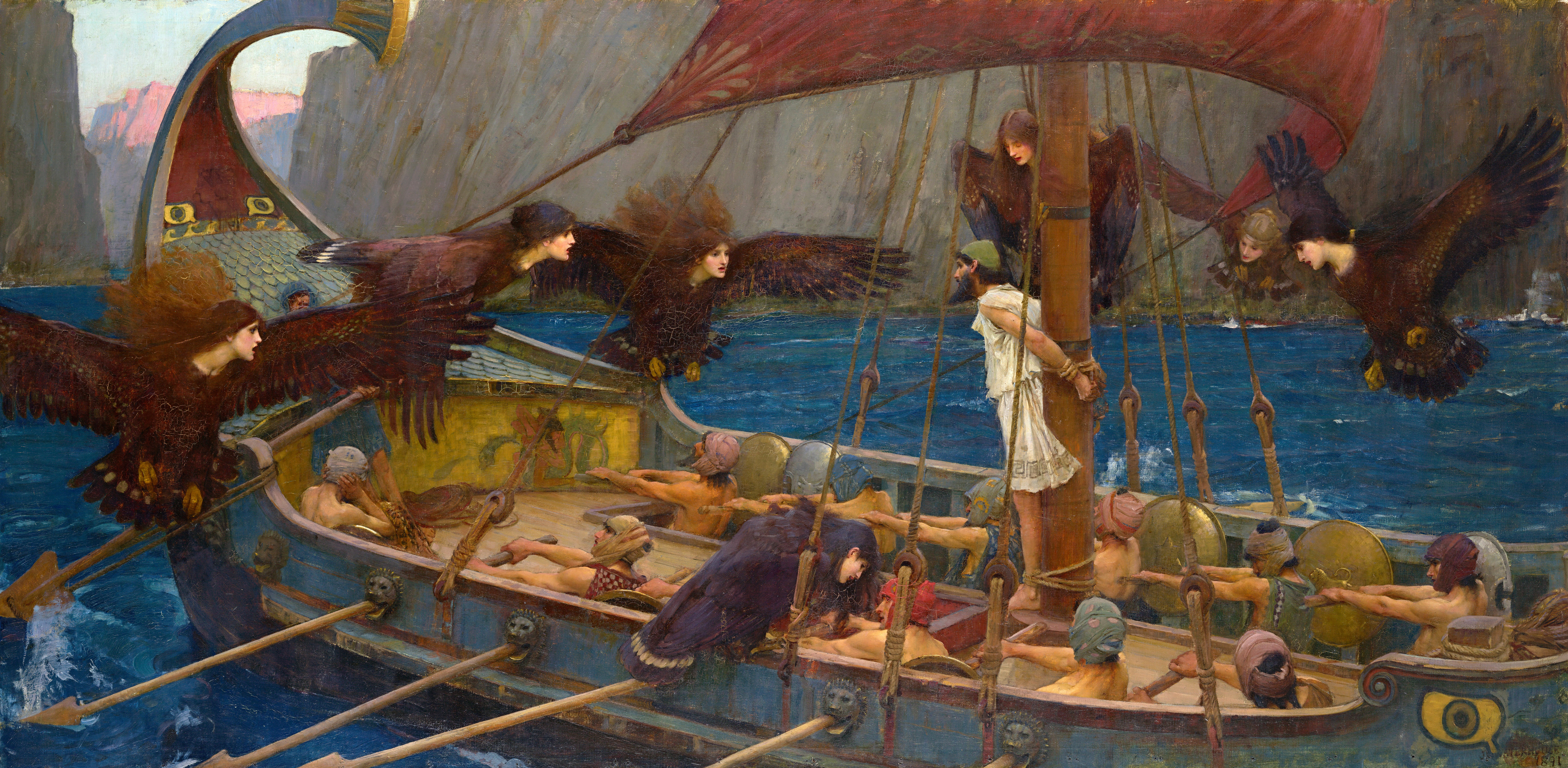
- Artist: John William Waterhouse
- Year: 1891
- Medium: oil on canvas
- Dimensions: 100.6 cm × 202.0 cm (39.6 in × 79.5 in)
- Location: National Gallery of Victoria, Melbourne, Australia

Ulysses and the Sirens is an 1891 painting by the Pre-Raphaelite artist John William Waterhouse. It is currently held in the National Gallery of Victoria, Melbourne, Australia.

== Description ==
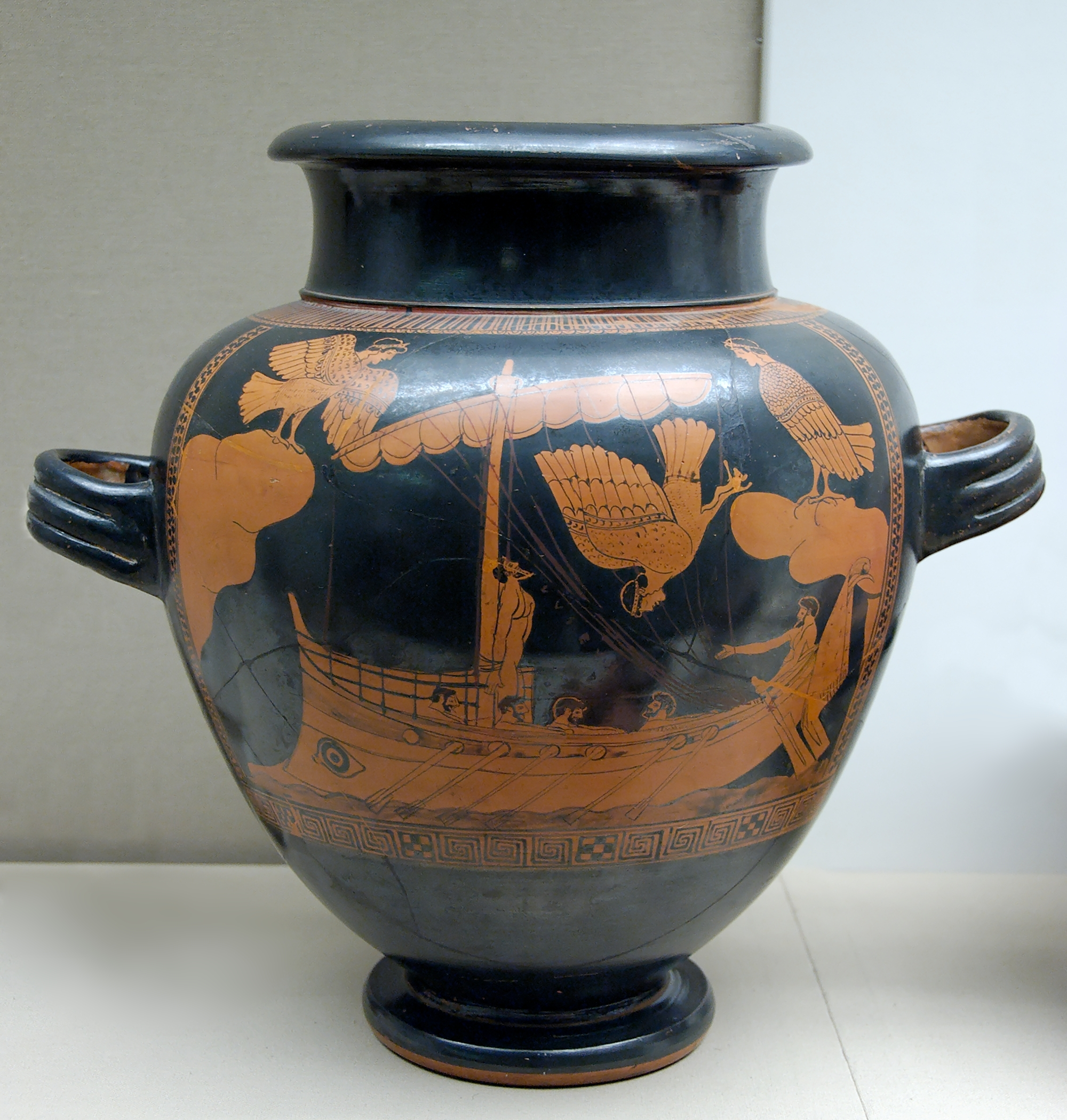
A 5th-century BC Greek vase in the British Museum with illustrations of Sirens similar to those in Ulysses and the Sirens

The work depicts a scene from the ancient Greek epic the Odyssey, in which the Sirens attempt to use their enchanting song to lure the titular hero Odysseus and his crew towards deadly waters. As per the Odyssey, Odysseus' crew had already blocked their ears to protect themselves from the Sirens' singing, but Odysseus, wanting to hear the Sirens, had ordered his crew to tie him to the mast so that he may have the pleasure of listening without risking himself or his ship.

The most controversial aspect of Waterhouse's painting was his depiction of the Sirens, as it differed greatly from contemporary Victorian era conceptions. While many of the original audience had expected to see the Sirens as mermaid-like nymphs, they were surprised to find them as bird-like creatures with women's heads. However, at the time of initial exhibition, The Magazine of Art critic Marion H. Spielmann noted that the idea of half-bird, half-woman Sirens is supported by depictions of Sirens similar to Waterhouse's on classical Greek vases.

== Exhibition ==
The painting was first exhibited in 1891 at the Royal Academy, London to critical acclaim for the imaginative and romantic representation of its subject. In June of that year, Sir Hubert von Herkomer purchased work for the National Gallery of Victoria, and it has since remained in the museum's collection.

== See also ==
- Ulysses pact
