= Nagoya Management Junior College =

College in Japan

- 名古屋経営短期大学
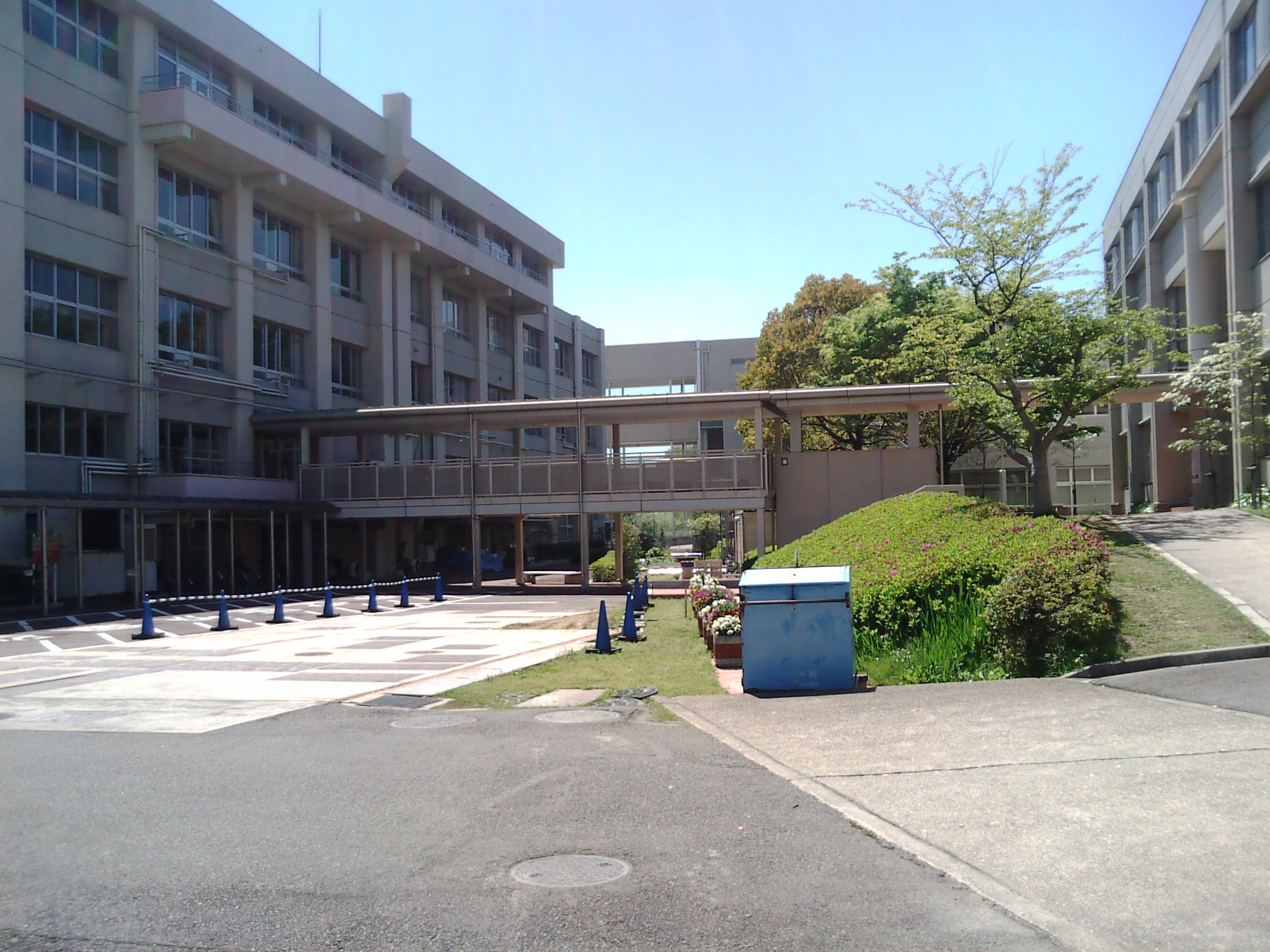
- Type: Private; Junior college
- Established: 1965
- Location: Owariasahi, Aichi, Japan; 35.2196°N 137.0311°E
- Website: www.jc.nagoya-su.ac.jp (in Japanese)

Nagoya Management Junior College (名古屋経営短期大学, Nagoya keiei tanki daigaku) is a private junior college located in the city of Owariasahi, very close to the city of Nagoya in Aichi Prefecture, Japan. Originally established as a women's junior college in 1965, the school became coeducational in 2000.
