= Partnership oath in Japan =

Provides limited benefits to some same-sex couples

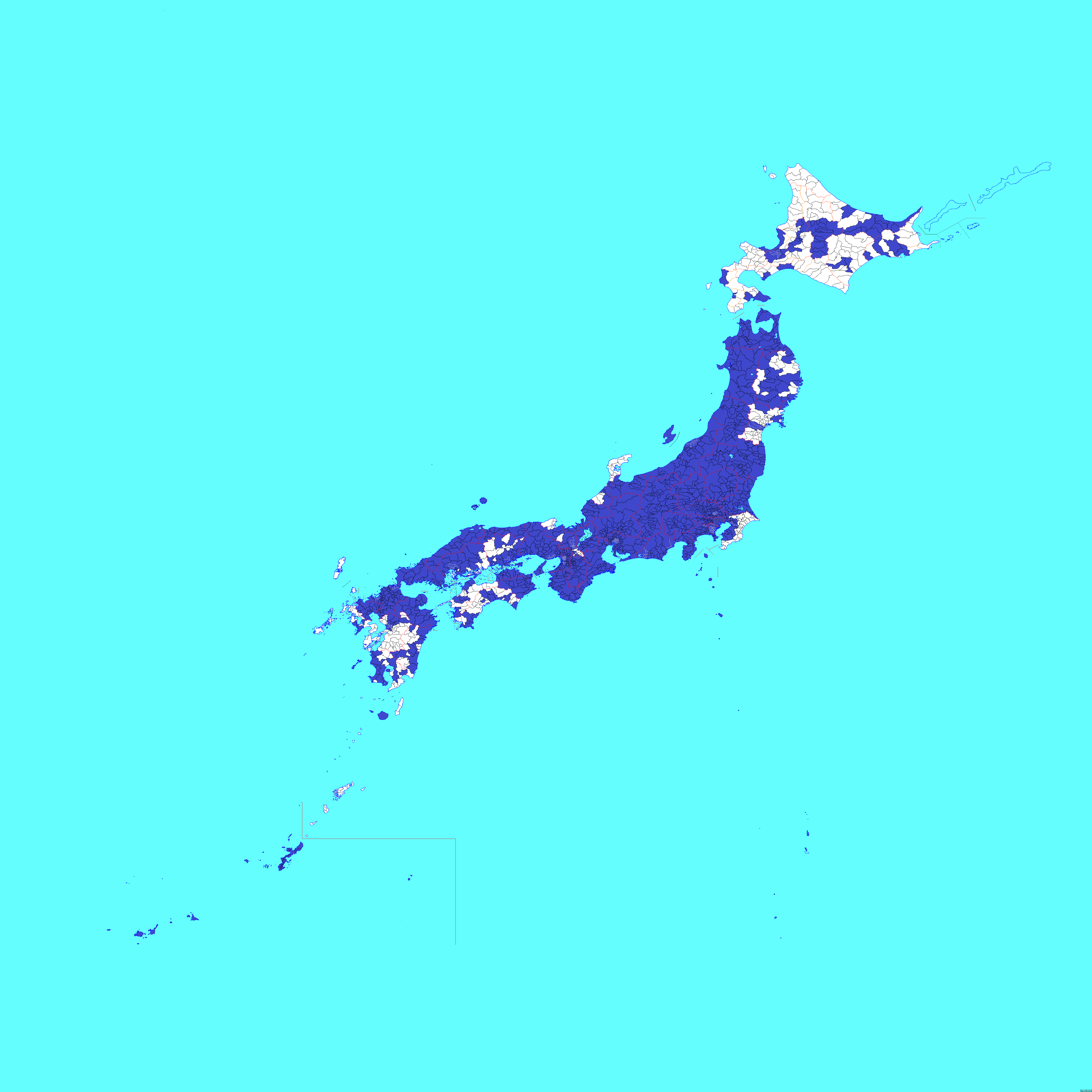
Map of Japanese subdivisions that issue partnership certificates to same-sex couples: Issues partnership certificates to same-sex couples

As of 1 October 2026, 571 municipalities and 31 of 47 prefectures in Japan have established a "partnership oath system" (Japanese: パートナーシップ宣誓制度, pātonāshippu sensei seido, pronounced [paːtonaːɕippɯ senseː seːdo]), also known as "partnership certification system" (パートナーシップ証明制度, pātonāshippu shōmei seido), which provides same-sex (and, in several jurisdictions, common-law opposite-sex) couples with some limited benefits.

== Benefits and limitations ==
The couple is issued a special certificate which may be useful in matters such as housing, hospital visitation rights and consenting to surgery for a partner. However, the system is not legally binding and there is no legal obligation on landlords or hospitals to honour the couples' rights even if presented with a certificate, though cities have encouraged companies, hospitals and landlords to recognize the certificate. The various benefits provided by the system are also very limited in comparison to those granted to married couples; same-sex couples cannot inherit the estate and property of a deceased partner or attend the funeral of a deceased partner for instance. Partners must meet certain requirements, including living in the municipality or prefecture, being older than 20 years of age, and not having a spouse or another partner.

In some jurisdictions, the children and other close relatives of a partnered couple may opt to be recognized in the partnership oath. Under the expanded "partnership familyship system" (パートナーシップ・ファミリーシップ制度, pātonāshippu famirīshippu seido), the children and in-laws of partnered couples are recognized, allowing partners to make medical decisions for their child, and to pick up their children at schools and kindergartens (whereas previously only the biological parent was allowed to pick up the child).

== Municipal partnership systems ==
On April 1, 2015, Shibuya in central Tokyo announced it would offer same-sex couples special "partnership certificates". While these licenses are not legally recognized as marriage certificates, they may be used in civil matters such as hospital visitation rights and housing. The Shibuya city office began accepting applications on 28 October 2015. In response to this action by the Shibuya city office, the "Special Committee to Protect Family Ties" (家族の絆を守る特命委員会, kazoku no kizuna wo mamoru tokumei iinkai) of the federal ruling Liberal Democratic Party was formed in March 2015 to discuss the matter. An officer from the Ministry of Justice who was invited to comment stated that the action by Shibuya is legal because the certificate issued is not a marriage certificate and the current Japanese legal code does not prohibit the "partnership" of same-sex couples. In July 2015, Setagaya announced it would be joining Shibuya in issuing partnership certificates from 5 November. In November 2015, the special city of Takarazuka announced it would issue partnership certificates to same-sex couples beginning on 1 June 2016. In December 2015, the city of Iga in Mie Prefecture made a similar announcement, with certificates starting on 1 April 2016, and on 22 February 2016, Naha, the capital of Okinawa Prefecture, announced it would begin issuing partnership certificates to same-sex couples on 8 July 2016.

In April 2016, an LGBT rights group began a campaign for the official recognition of same-sex couples in Sapporo, the capital of Hokkaido Prefecture. The group took its petition to the Sapporo City Government in June 2016. In December 2016, officials announced that Sapporo planned to draw up guidelines by March 2017. In March, the City Government announced that partnership certificates would be issued to couples beginning on 1 June 2017. While the certificates hold no legal meaning, some insurance companies use them to allow same-sex partners to be added as beneficiaries. According to the city, about 1,500 people expressed opinions welcoming the program, while some opposed it. Sapporo became the first designated city in Japan to establish a partnership system. On 14 February 2018, the Fukuoka city office announced plans to start issuing partnership certificates to same-sex and different-sex couples from 2 April 2018. Osaka followed suit on 9 July 2018, and Chiba on 29 January 2019. Nakano began offering partnership certificates on 20 August 2018. Couples can receive notarized documentation recognizing a delegation agreement for medical treatment and nursing care, property management and other areas in which married couples share responsibility.

The number of cities which have established a partnership registry has steadily increased in the years since. 21 cities established a same-sex partnership system in 2019, notably Kitakyushu, Kumamoto, Miyazaki, Nagasaki, Sakai, Yokohama, and Yokosuka. 36 more cities followed suit in 2020, including Hamamatsu, Kawasaki, Kyoto, Minato, Nara, Niigata, Okayama, Sagamihara, Saitama, and Takamatsu. 69 more cities followed in 2021, notably Adachi, Chigasaki, Fujisawa, Funabashi, Hiroshima, Kanazawa, Kōchi, Koshigaya, Nishinomiya, and Toyota. 107 cities established a partnership system in 2022, including Akita, Kagoshima, Nagano, Nagoya, and Shizuoka, and 106 cities in 2023, including Kobe, Kashiwa, Morioka, Ōita, Matsudo, Ichikawa, Machida and Fujisawa. On 1 April 2023, Kagawa became the first prefecture in which all municipalities had created their own registries, despite lacking a prefecture-wide registry; Kanagawa became the second by 1 July 2023.

== Prefectural partnership systems ==
Map of Japan showing which prefectures have legalized same-sex partnership registries: Purple prefectures have active familyship registries with recognition of children and in-laws. Magenta prefectures have active partnership registries. Blue prefectures have passed legislation to create registries, but they are not yet in effect. Light green prefectures do not have a prefecture-wide system, but all municipalities within have registries. Yellow prefectures recognize their own municipalities' partnership registries without having a prefecture-level registry. Gray prefectures do not have any prefecture-level registries nor recognition.

In January 2019, the Government of Ibaraki Prefecture announced it was considering introducing a partnership system for same-sex couples in April 2019. In March 2019, Governor Kazuhiko Ōigawa expressed his personal support for the introduction of such a scheme. The Ibaraki Prefectural Assembly began examing legislation to this effect in June 2019. The prefecture has offered partnership certificates since July 1, 2019, which made it the first prefecture to do so. Eight days later, Mito, the prefectural capital, announced that couples who are in the possession of the prefecture's certificates would be eligible to move into the municipality's public housing facilities, starting in August 2019.

On 15 January 2020, Osaka Prefecture announced it would start a partnership system on January 22. Governor Hirofumi Yoshimura said in a statement that "we should aim for a society where one can live as themselves". The first couple to receive a certificate were Shuji Yamada and Shigeo Hiruda on 31 January. The certificate allows couples to apply to move into prefectural housing and consent to surgery, among other limited benefits. Five cities in Osaka had already established such a system before it was extended to the entire prefecture. Gunma Prefecture announced on 5 November 2020 that it would introduce a partnership system by the end of the year. The system would provide same-sex couples with some limited recognition, including the right to move into prefectural housing and visit each other in hospitals. Governor Ichita Yamamoto said he hoped the move would "send a positive message" and "promote diversity". On 17 December, Yamamoto announced the system would be established on 21 December. The first certificate was issued to couple Saori Tanaka and Hisanagi Makita in Shibukawa on 24 December.

On 20 November 2020, Governor Eikei Suzuki of Mie Prefecture announced his intention to introduce a partnership system before the end of the year. The system was introduced on 1 September 2021, with the first couple issued a certificate that same day in Tsu. Saga Prefecture started its partnership oath system a few days earlier, on 27 August 2021. Governor Yoshinori Yamaguchi praised the move. In November 2021, the government of Aomori Prefecture announced its intention to introduce a partnership system on 7 February 2022. A partnership oath system has also been in effect in Akita and Fukuoka prefectures since 1 April 2022. On 15 February 2022, Governor Tomikazu Fukuda of Tochigi Prefecture announced he would introduce a partnership system in fall 2022; it was established on 1 September 2022.

On 7 June 2021, the General Affairs Committee of the Tokyo Metropolitan Assembly unanimously accepted a petition, launched by LGBT activists and signed by 18,000 people, to establish a partnership system in Tokyo Metropolis. Governor Yuriko Koike expressed her support for the move, stating it would "respect the human rights of sexual minorities and promote the understanding of Tokyo citizens regarding diversity". The bill was enacted by the Metropolitan Assembly on 15 June 2022. It calls on businesses and other entities to treat same-sex partnerships as equal to married couples, allowing couples to access family-use housing and the right to visit their partners in hospital. At least one partner must be resident in Tokyo or a commuter for work. It came into force on 1 November, with applications being accepted from 10 October, making Tokyo the tenth prefecture to do so.

Governor Hajime Furuta of Gifu Prefecture announced on 10 December 2020 that he was considering establishing a partnership system in the prefecture. Governor Heita Kawakatsu of Shizuoka Prefecture announced on 1 September 2021 that he was also considering it by the end of 2022. The Deputy Governor of Toyama Prefecture voiced the same in December 2021. Both Shizuoka and Toyama prefectures established a partnership system on 1 March 2023.

Overall, the number of prefectures which have established a partnership registry has slowly increased over the years. 1 was established in 2019 (Ibaraki), 2 in 2020 (Osaka, Gunma), 2 in 2021 (Saga, Mie), 5 in 2022 (Aomori, Akita, Fukuoka, Tochigi, Tokyo), 9 in 2023 (Shizuoka, Toyama, Nagano, Gifu, Kagawa, Shimane, Tottori, Fukui, Yamanashi), 11 in 2024 (Yamagata, Wakayama, Aichi, Hyogo, Nara, Oita, Tokushima, Yamaguchi, Shiga, Fukushima, Niigata) and 1 in 2025 (Okinawa). The establishment of prefectural systems has often not precluded the subsequent establishments of municipal systems within the same prefecture.

== Mutual recognition of certificates ==
=== Between cities ===
On October 30, 2019, the cities of Fukuoka and Kumamoto announced they would recognize each other's partnership certificates effective immediately. This marked the first time that two or more jurisdictions in Japan had begun recognizing each other's certificates, easing recognition for same-sex couples. This means that if a same-sex couple with a certificate moves between both cities they need not reapply for a certificate in their new city. Since 1 April 2020, certificates from Kitakyushu and Koga are also recognized between the four cities. Certificates from Okayama, Nichinan, and Karatsu are also recognised in Fukuoka.

On December 2, 2019, the mayor of Yokosuka announced his intention to establish a joint recognition scheme with the fellow Kanagawa cities of Zushi and Kamakura, taking effect on 1 April 2020. Hayama joined the scheme on 1 July 2020, and Miura joined on 1 January 2021. In July 2020, Okayama and Sōja agreed to mutually recognize their certificates and eliminate the need for new procedures when couples move between the two cities. Okayama reached a similar agreement with Fukuoka in November 2020 and Hiroshima in January 2021. Hiroshima and Akitakata also mutually recognize their certificates. The cities of Katano and Hirakata decided to recognize each other's certificates in June 2021. Since then, numerous other cities have also established such mutual recognition schemes. On 1 February 2022, a similar agreement took effect between Chigasaki, Fujisawa and Samukawa.

The cities of Chiba and Yokohama made a similar recognition agreement in January 2021, effective on 1 February 2021. In early April 2021, the cities and towns of Amagasaki, Ashiya, Inagawa, Itami, Kawanishi, Nishinomiya, Sanda and Takarazuka, all in Hyōgo Prefecture, agreed to recognize each other's certificates. Likewise, in May 2021, 12 municipalities in Tokyo, Adachi, Bunkyō, Edogawa, Fuchū, Koganei, Kokubunji, Kunitachi, Minato, Nakano, Setagaya, Shibuya and Toshima, agreed to mutually recognize each other's certificates. The cities of Chiba, Funabashi, Ichikawa, Matsudo, Kashiwa, and Narashino, all in Chiba prefecture, signed a mutual recognition agreement on July 11, 2023.

Eighteen cities in Aichi Prefecture signed an agreement to recognize each other's partnership certificates on October 17, 2023. On October 29, 2023, the Kanagawa Prefecture cities of Fujisawa, Yokohama and Isehara signed an agreement.

=== Between prefectures ===
On 18 August 2022, Saga and Ibaraki prefectures announced they would recognize each other's partnership certificates, becoming the first prefectures to do so. Saga Prefecture completed a similar agreement with Fukuoka on 24 November. On 20 December, mutual recognition was established between Ibaraki, Tochigi and Gunma prefectures. On 31 January 2023, Ibaraki signed an agreement with Mie. On September 4, 2023, Ibaraki signed an agreement with Toyama. On February 22, 2024, an agreement was signed between Mie and Gifu prefectures.

=== Between prefectures and internal municipalities ===
In March 2020, Iwate Prefecture passed a law to recognize partnership registries created by municipalities within the prefecture for purpose of benefits, despite not having a prefecture-level registry at the time.

Upon establishing its own partnership registry in November 2022, Tokyo Metropolis mutually recognized all partnership registries in Tokyo's wards and cities.

=== Between prefectures and external municipalities ===
On October 30, 2023, Ibaraki Prefecture and the city of Saitama, Saitama Prefecture signed an agreement to recognize each other's partnership registries.

=== Partnership System Inter-Municipality Collaboration Network ===
On April 1, 2024, the governments of Osaka and Hyogo prefectures established a Partnership System Inter-Municipality Collaboration Network (Japanese: パートナーシップ制度自治体間連携ネットワーク, romanized: Pātonāshippu seido jichitai-kan renkei nettowāku) as a common mutual agreement through which signatory jurisdictions, including prefectures, cities, towns and villages, may recognize and process each other's partnership registries for purposes of travel or relocation, eliminating the need for returning a certificate to a former jurisdiction of residence, the need to submit documentary proof of non-marriage and the need to repeat the oath. The Network agreement requires those relocating between member jurisdictions to submit a completed Declaration Continuation Form, proof of a certificate from their prior residence, proof of a change of address for both partners and personal identification. On October 23, 2024, 17 prefectures (Aichi, Akita, Aomori, Fukui, Fukuoka, Gifu, Gunma, Ibaraki, Mie, Nara, Niigata, Oita, Saga, Shiga, Toyama, Wakayama and Yamagata) and 150 cities, towns and villages announced their registries' accession to the network agreement effective November 1. As of April 9, 2025, Tochigi Prefecture acceded to the network. On October 1, 2025, Tottori prefecture joined the network. As of 1 October, 17 cities and towns in the Kagawa Prefecture acceded to the network, bringing the number to 261 member municipalities.

The governments of Fukushima, Nagano, Shimane, Shizuoka, Tokushima, Tokyo, Yamaguchi and Yamanashi prefectures, all of which have registries, have yet to announce their accession.

== List of partnership oath systems ==
As of 1 October 2026, the following 571 municipalities and 31 prefectures have established a same-sex partnership oath system, comprising about 93.82% of the Japanese population. Two other jurisdictions have policies which have yet to be dated. Prefectures are bolded. An asterisk (*) indicates that familyship registration is also available.

2015	28 October	Shibuya, Tokyo
2015	5 November	Setagaya, Tokyo*
2016	1 April	Iga, Mie
2016	1 June	Takarazuka, Hyōgo
2016	8 July	Naha, Okinawa*
2017	1 June	Sapporo, Hokkaido*
2018	2 April	Fukuoka, Fukuoka
2018	9 July	Osaka, Osaka*
2018	20 August	Nakano, Tokyo
2019	1 January	Ōizumi, Gunma
2019	29 January	Chiba, Chiba*
2019	1 April	Edogawa, Tokyo; Fuchū, Tokyo; Hirakata, Osaka; Kumamoto, Kumamoto; Odawara, Kanagawa; Sakai, Osaka; Sōja, Okayama*; Toshima, Tokyo; Yokosuka, Kanagawa
2019	3 June	Kanuma, Tochigi*
2019	10 June	Miyazaki, Miyazaki
2019	1 July	**Ibaraki**; Kitakyushu, Fukuoka
2019	1 September	Nishio, Aichi
2019	2 September	Nagasaki, Nagasaki
2019	11 October	Sanda, Hyōgo*
2019	22 November	Katano, Osaka
2019	2 December	Yokohama, Kanagawa
2019	4 December	Daitō, Osaka; Kamakura, Kanagawa
2020	1 January	Mitoyo, Kagawa*
2020	6 January	Amagasaki, Hyōgo
2020	22 January	**Osaka**
2020	1 April	Bunkyō, Tokyo; Hamamatsu, Shizuoka; Kijō, Miyazaki; Koga, Fukuoka*; Minato, Tokyo; Nara, Nara; Niigata, Niigata; Sagamihara, Kanagawa; Saitama, Saitama; Takamatsu, Kagawa*; Tokushima, Tokushima*; Yamatokōriyama, Nara; Zushi, Kanagawa
2020	1 May	Kawagoe, Saitama; Toyoake, Aichi
2020	15 May	Itami, Hyōgo
2020	17 May	Ashiya, Hyōgo
2020	1 July	Hayama, Kanagawa; Inabe, Mie; Kawasaki, Kanagawa; Okayama, Okayama; Tondabayashi, Osaka*
2020	1 August	Kawanishi, Hyōgo
2020	1 September	Kaizuka, Osaka; Kyoto, Kyoto
2020	1 October	Sakado, Saitama
2020	20 October	Koganei, Tokyo
2020	1 November	Kitamoto, Saitama; Matsudo, Chiba*; Tochigi, Tochigi
2020	15 November	Kokubunji, Tokyo
2020	1 December	Kōnosu, Saitama*
2020	10 December	Hirosaki, Aomori
2020	21 December	**Gunma**; Shibukawa, Gunma
2021	1 January	Higashikagawa, Kagawa; Miura, Kanagawa; Yoshinogawa, Tokushima
2021	4 January	Hiroshima, Hiroshima
2021	8 January	Akashi, Hyōgo*
2021	1 February	Kōchi, Kōchi; Okegawa, Saitama
2021	1 March	Kameoka, Kyoto; Ina, Saitama
2021	16 March	Ageo, Saitama
2021	1 April	Adachi, Tokyo*; Annaka, Gunma; Chigasaki, Kanagawa; Fuji, Shizuoka; Fujisawa, Kanagawa; Gyōda, Saitama; Honjō, Saitama; Ibusuki, Kagoshima; Ikoma, Nara; Inagawa, Hyōgo; Kitajima, Tokushima; Koshigaya, Saitama; Kunitachi, Tokyo; Matsumoto, Nagano; Miyoshi, Saitama*; Nichinan, Miyazaki; Nishinomiya, Hyōgo; Shōdoshima, Kagawa; Tadotsu, Kagawa; Tenri, Nara; Tonoshō, Kagawa; Toyohashi, Aichi; Usuki, Ōita; Yamato, Kanagawa
2021	26 April	Nobeoka, Miyazaki
2021	1 May	Urayasu, Chiba
2021	1 June	Chiyoda, Gunma; Nagaokakyō, Kyoto
2021	1 July	Higashimatsuyama, Saitama; Kanazawa, Ishikawa; Minamiashigara, Kanagawa; Ōi, Kanagawa
2021	16 July	Toyota, Aichi*
2021	27 August	**Saga**
2021	1 September	**Mie**; Miyoshi, Tokushima; Iruma, Saitama*; Nikkō, Tochigi; Shintomi, Miyazaki; Ube, Yamaguchi
2021	1 October	Akitakata, Hiroshima; Bizen, Okayama; Hikone, Shiga; Karatsu, Saga; Kawajima, Saitama*; Kuki, Saitama; Matsuda, Kanagawa; Moroyama, Saitama; Ōzu, Kumamoto; Urasoe, Okinawa
2021	3 October	Mukō, Kyoto
2021	11 October	Sayama, Saitama
2021	1 November	Naka, Tokushima
2021	1 December	Ebino, Miyazaki; Kōshū, Yamanashi; Kurashiki, Okayama; Maniwa, Okayama; Tokigawa, Saitama; Zentsūji, Kagawa
2021	10 December	Hakusan, Ishikawa
2021	16 December	Funabashi, Chiba
2021	20 December	Sōka, Saitama
2022	1 January	Hannō, Saitama*; Hidaka, Saitama*; Kagoshima, Kagoshima; Mihara, Hiroshima; Tokorozawa, Saitama*
2022	4 January	Gamagōri, Aichi
2022	1 February	Ayase, Kanagawa; Ichikawa, Chiba*; Samukawa, Kanagawa; Tama, Tokyo; Yoshikawa, Saitama
2022	7 February	**Aomori**
2022	1 March	Ebetsu, Hokkaido; Kamimine, Saga; Mima, Tokushima
2022	23 March	Fukaya, Saitama
2022	1 April	**Akita**; **Fukuoka**; Aikawa, Kanagawa; Akita, Akita; Anan, Tokushima*; Atsugi, Kanagawa; Ayagawa, Kagawa; Bungo-Ōno, Ōita*; Ebina, Kanagawa; Fuchū-cho, Hiroshima; Fujimi, Saitama; Fukuchiyama, Kyoto; Fukutsu, Fukuoka; Hakodate, Hokkaido; Hatoyama, Saitama; Hatsukaichi, Hiroshima; Himeji, Hyōgo; Hiratsuka, Kanagawa; Kadogawa, Miyazaki; Kaisei, Kanagawa; Kamikawa, Saitama; Kamisato, Saitama; Kan'onji, Kagawa*; Kasaoka, Okayama*; Kasuya, Fukuoka*; Kita, Tokyo; Kitami, Hokkaido; Komagane, Nagano; Kosai, Shizuoka*; Kotohira, Kagawa; Kumagaya, Saitama; Mannō, Kagawa; Misato, Saitama; Miyashiro, Saitama*; Musashino, Tokyo; Nakai, Kanagawa; Ninomiya, Kanagawa; Nogi, Tochigi; Ōiso, Kanagawa; Okazaki, Aichi*; Saito, Miyazaki; Sanuki, Kagawa; Seki, Gifu; Shinshiro, Aichi; Shizuoka, Shizuoka; Tahara, Aichi; Takahama, Aichi; Taketa, Ōita; Tatsuno, Hyōgo; Utazu, Kagawa; Yamakita, Kanagawa; Yashio, Saitama; Yokoze, Saitama; Yoshimi, Saitama*; Yoshioka, Gunma
2022	25 April	Arakawa, Tokyo
2022	1 May	Kasugai, Aichi
2022	1 June	Hyūga, Miyazaki; Narashino, Chiba; Naruto, Tokushima; Sakaide, Kagawa; Tosashimizu, Kōchi*
2022	1 July	Fujimino, Saitama; Ibaraki, Osaka; Kiyokawa, Kanagawa; Sakaiminato, Tottori; Toyokawa, Aichi
2022	30 July	Kikuchi, Kumamoto
2022	1 September	**Tochigi**; Ichinomiya, Aichi*; Miki, Kagawa; Misato, Saitama; Sanjō, Niigata; Sano, Tochigi; Toyoyama, Aichi*
2022	1 October	Awa, Tokushima; Echizen, Fukui; Hashimoto, Wakayama*; Kaita, Hiroshima; Kuroshio, Kōchi; Mimasaka, Okayama; Miyoshi, Aichi; Nasushiobara, Tochigi; Ōtawara, Tochigi; Setouchi, Okayama; Zama, Kanagawa
2022	11 October	Toda, Saitama*
2022	1 November	**Tokyo***; Ikeda, Osaka*; Nankoku, Kōchi
2022	1 December	Asakuchi, Okayama; Nagano, Nagano; Nagoya, Aichi*; Obihiro, Hokkaido
2022	4 December	Nonoichi, Ishikawa
2022	23 December	Ichinoseki, Iwate*
2023	1 January	Hita, Ōita; Marugame, Kagawa; Ogano, Saitama; Shiraoka, Saitama
2023	4 January	Tomakomai, Hokkaido
2023	5 January	Miyoshi, Hiroshima
2023	10 January	Wakō, Saitama*
2023	1 February	Iwamizawa, Hokkaido; Komaki, Aichi*; Nagaoka, Niigata*
2023	1 March	**Shizuoka**; **Toyama**; Kikuyō, Kumamoto; Kōnan, Kōchi; Nisshin, Aichi; Ranzan, Saitama*
2023	15 March	Chōfu, Tokyo; Kashiwa, Chiba*
2023	23 March	Kazo, Saitama
2023	1 April	Asaka, Saitama*; Aso, Kumamoto; Ayabe, Kyoto; Bungotakada, Ōita; Chiryū, Aichi; Gojō, Nara; Hakone, Kanagawa; Handa, Aichi; Hasuda, Saitama; Higashihiroshima, Hiroshima; Hino, Tokyo; Hokuto, Hokkaido; Ibara, Okayama; Ikaruga, Nara; Imabari, Ehime; Kaizu, Gifu*; Kanda, Fukuoka; Kasukabe, Saitama*; Katsuyama, Fukui; Kisarazu, Chiba; Kobayashi, Miyazaki; Kōshi, Kumamoto; Machida, Tokyo; Maibara, Shiga*; Matsubushi, Saitama; Meiwa, Mie; Nachikatsuura, Wakayama*; Namegawa, Saitama*; Naoshima, Kagawa; Nasukarasuyama, Tochigi; Niiza, Saitama*; Nōgata, Fukuoka; Ogawa, Saitama; Ōmura, Nagasaki; Oyama, Tochigi; Ōzu, Ehime; Sabae, Fukui; Sakata, Yamagata; Satte, Saitama; Shiki, Saitama*; Sugito, Saitama; Suita, Osaka; Sumida, Tokyo; Takasago, Hyōgo*; Tamba, Hyōgo; Tamba-Sasayama, Hyōgo; Tōkai, Aichi; Tsurugashima, Saitama; Wake, Okayama; Yugawara, Kanagawa
2023	24 April	Suginami, Tokyo
2023	1 May	Matsubara, Osaka; Morioka, Iwate*
2023	15 May	Tagawa, Fukuoka
2023	1 June	Aki, Kōchi; Awara, Fukui; Higashichichibu, Saitama; Nagakute, Aichi; Ōyamazaki, Kyoto
2023	1 July	Hadano, Kanagawa; Isehara, Kanagawa; Kakogawa, Hyōgo; Kariya, Aichi; Kawara, Fukuoka; Kōta, Aichi; Manazuru, Kanagawa; Ōbu, Aichi; Ōmihachiman, Shiga; Warabi, Saitama
2023	1 August	**Nagano**; Seto, Aichi; Suzaka, Nagano
2023	1 September	**Gifu**; Ōita, Ōita
2023	28 September	Miyako, Iwate*
2023	1 October	**Kagawa**; **Shimane**; **Tottori***; Chita, Aichi; Fuchū, Hiroshima; Hioki, Kagoshima; Kurayoshi, Tottori*; Shingū, Wakayama*; Tsubata, Ishikawa; Yahaba, Iwate
2023	10 October	Nirasaki, Yamanashi*
2023	1 November	**Fukui**; **Yamanashi**; Itabashi, Tokyo; Minano, Saitama; Obama, Fukui; Sakai, Fukui; Tsuruga, Fukui; Yorii, Saitama*
2023	27 November	Eiheiji, Fukui
2023	1 December	Hayashima, Okayama*; Kai, Yamanashi
2023	10 December	Kahoku, Ishikawa
2023	25 December	Kobe, Hyōgo
2024	1 January	Awaji, Hyōgo; Daisen, Tottori*; Fukui, Fukui; Izumisano, Osaka*; Misasa, Tottori; Otaru, Hokkaido; Ōtsuki, Kōchi; Shibushi, Kagoshima; Soeda, Fukuoka; Tamamura, Gunma; Takikawa, Hokkaido; Yazu, Tottori*
2024	4 January	**Yamagata**; Date, Fukushima; Ichihara, Chiba
2024	16 January	Aibetsu, Hokkaido; Asahikawa, Hokkaido; Biei, Hokkaido; Higashikagura, Hokkaido; Higashikawa, Hokkaido; Pippu, Hokkaido; Takasu, Hokkaido; Tōma, Hokkaido
2024	1 February	**Wakayama**; Chichibu, Saitama*; Izumi, Kagoshima; Jōetsu, Niigata*; Kōnan, Aichi*; Nagareyama, Chiba*
2024	1 March	Fukagawa, Hokkaido; Hanyū, Saitama*; Murakami, Niigata*; Owariasahi, Aichi*
2024	29 March	Ogose, Saitama*
2024	1 April	**Aichi***; **Hyōgo**; **Nara**; **Ōita**; **Tokushima**; Abashiri, Hokkaido; Abu, Yamaguchi; Akaiwa, Okayama*; Anjō, Aichi*; Fusō, Aichi*; Heguri, Nara; Higashiura, Aichi*; Himeshima, Ōita; Hiraizumi, Iwate*; Ino, Kōchi; Inuyama, Aichi*; Kamikawa, Hokkaido; Kasai, Hyōgo*; Katagami, Akita; Kawanishi, Nara; Kimitsu, Chiba*; Kitahiroshima, Hiroshima; Kitakami, Iwate; Kiyosato, Hokkaido; Kiyosu, Aichi*; Komatsushima, Tokushima; Koshimizu, Hokkaido; Kuji, Iwate*; Kusatsu, Shiga; Kushimoto, Wakayama*; Kushiro, Hokkaido; Miki, Hyōgo; Minamiawaji, Hyōgo; Mitaka, Tokyo; Muroran, Hokkaido; Nagahama, Shiga; Nagatoro, Saitama; Nantan, Kyoto; Ōfunato, Iwate*; Ōguchi, Aichi*; Ōno, Fukui; Ōzora, Hokkaido; Rikuzentakata, Iwate*; Saiki, Ōita; Shari, Hokkaido; Shisō, Hyōgo*; Shiwa, Iwate*; Shōbara, Hiroshima; Sodegaura, Chiba*; Sumoto, Hyōgo; Takachiho, Miyazaki; Taketoyo, Aichi*; Uchiko, Ehime*; Usa, Ōita; Yamaguchi, Yamaguchi; Yufu, Ōita
2024	1 May	Harima, Hyōgo
2024	13 May	Minamisōma, Fukushima*
2024	1 June	Minamichita, Aichi*
2024	10 June	Kōka, Shiga*
2024	1 July	Fukushima, Fukushima*; Sakurai, Nara; Shibata, Niigata*
2024	1 August	Kizugawa, Kyoto*
2024	7 August	Kunitomi, Miyazaki
2024	1 September	**Yamaguchi**
2024	2 September	**Fukushima**; **Niigata**; **Shiga**; Motomiya, Fukushima*; Tainai, Niigata*
2024	1 October	Futtsu, Chiba*; Kanoya, Kagoshima; Kitahiroshima, Hokkaido; Tsuyama, Okayama
2024	1 December	Togitsu, Nagasaki
2024	10 December	Sendai, Miyagi
2025	1 January	Ama, Aichi*; Hachimantai, Iwate*; Kawaguchi, Saitama; Minamisatsuma, Kagoshima; Matsusaka, Mie; Yawata, Kyoto
2025	1 February	Abiko, Chiba*; Kurihara, Miyagi
2025	3 February	Matsuyama, Ehime*
2025	1 March	Toyonaka, Osaka
2025	28 March	**Okinawa**
2025	1 April	Aioi, Hyōgo; Aisai, Aichi*; Akiōta, Hiroshima; Bihoro, Hokkaido*; Esashi, Hiyama, Hokkaido; Furano, Hokkaido; Hanamaki, Iwate*; Ichikikushikino, Kagoshima*; Inazawa, Aichi*; Ishikari, Hokkaido; Iwakura, Aichi*; Kamagaya, Chiba*; Kamifurano, Hokkaido; Kashihara, Nara; Kinokawa, Wakayama*; Kunneppu, Hokkaido*; Maizuru, Kyoto*; Makubetsu, Hokkaido; Mihara, Kōchi; Minamifurano, Hokkaido; Muroto, Kōchi; Nakafurano, Hokkaido; Nakama, Fukuoka; Ninohe, Iwate*; Noboribetsu, Hokkaido*; Numata, Hokkaido; Oketo, Hokkaido*; Ōshū, Iwate*; Sakura, Chiba*; Sera, Hiroshima; Shimukappu, Hokkaido; Shirahama, Wakayama*; Tamano, Okayama*; Tōno, Iwate*; Tosa, Kōchi; Tsubetsu, Hokkaido*; Uwajima, Ehime*; Yachiyo, Chiba*; Yamatotakada, Nara; Yatomi, Aichi*; Yukuhashi, Fukuoka*
2025	1 May	Ōsakasayama, Osaka*
2025	2 June	Tawaramoto, Nara*
2025	1 July	Kōtō, Tokyo*; Naie, Hokkaido; Shimanto, Kōchi*
2025	1 August	Akkeshi, Hokkaido; Jōyō, Kyoto*
2025	1 September	Kirishima, Kagoshima
2025	1 October	Ōtake, Hiroshima; Satsumasendai, Kagoshima; Urausu, Hokkaido
2025	1 December	Yusuhara, Kōchi
2026	1 January	Sakawa, Kōchi
2026	1 February	Kyōtanabe, Kyoto
2026	1 March	Tachikawa, Tokyo*; Tosa, Kōchi
2026	1 April	Akune, Kagoshima; Geisei, Kōchi; Hidaka, Kōchi; Hirono, Iwate*; Ishinomaki, Miyagi; Kamisunagawa, Hokkaido; Kesennuma, Miyagi*; Kure, Hiroshima; Minamikyūshū, Kagoshima*; Minoh, Osaka; Monbetsu, Hokkaido; Noda, Chiba*; Seirō, Niigata; Setana, Hokkaido*; Sunagawa, Hokkaido; Takizawa, Iwate*; Ukiha, Fukuoka; Yakushima, Kagoshima; Yamada, Iwate*; Yamaga, Kumamoto*
2026	1 June	Bibai, Hokkaido
2026	1 July	Higashiōsaka, Osaka
2026	1 August	Shibecha, Hokkaido; Yotsukaidō, Chiba*

=== Future partnership systems ===
2026	TBD	**Nagasaki**
TBD	TBD	Tomioka, Fukushima

Measures to allow partnership certificates have been proposed in numerous areas, including the prefectures of Ishikawa, Iwate and Kagoshima; several administrative wards in Tokyo, such as Chiyoda, Chūō, Katsushika, Nerima, Shinjuku, and Taitō; and the cities of Tōgō, Hachinohe, Fukuyama, Kumano, Onomichi, Saka, Azumino, Nagayo, Kamo, Sado, Itoman, Okinawa, Nago, Nanjō, Tomigusuku, Fujieda, Shimada, Higashimurayama, Nichinan, Yonago, Toyama, Hagi, Hirao, Iwakuni and Shimonoseki.

== Family registration ==
Numerous other municipalities have also established a "partnership familyship system" (パートナーシップ・ファミリーシップ制度, pātonāshippu famirīshippu seido). This system also recognises the children and in-laws of same-sex couples, and allows partners to make medical decisions for their child, and to pick up their children at schools and kindergartens (whereas previously only the biological parent was allowed to pick up the child). The first to establish this system was Akashi, Hyōgo in January 2021 followed by Tokushima in February 2021 and Adachi, Tokyo in April 2021. Tokyo established a partnership system with a similar option in November 2022, becoming the first prefectural government to do so.

=== List of familyship registries ===
2021	January	Akashi, Hyōgo
2021	February	Tokushima, Tokushima
2021	April	Adachi, Tokyo
2021	July	Koga, Fukuoka, Toyota, Aichi
2021	September	Iruma, Saitama, Miyoshi, Tokushima
2021	October	Kawajima, Saitama
2021	December	Kōnosu, Saitama, Sōja, Okayama
2022	January	Hannō, Saitama, Hidaka, Tokorozawa, Mitoyo, Kagawa
2022	February	Ichikawa, Chiba
2022	April	Anan, Tokushima, Bungo-Ōno, Kan'onji, Kagawa, Kanuma, Tochigi, Kasaoka, Okayama, Kasuya, Fukuoka, Kosai, Shizuoka, Miyashiro, Saitama, Okazaki, Aichi, Yoshimi, Saitama
2022	June	Tosashimizu, Kōchi
2022	July	Tondabayashi, Osaka
2022	August	Osaka, Osaka
2022	September	Ichinomiya, Aichi, Toyoyama, Aichi
2022	October	Naha, Okinawa, Toda, Saitama, Ikeda, Osaka
2022	November	Tokyo Prefecture
2022	December	Setagaya, Tokyo, Nagoya, Aichi, Ichinoseki, Iwate
2023	January	Wako, Saitama
2023	February	Komaki, Aichi, Nagaoka, Niigata
2023	March	Ranzan, Saitama, Kashiwa, Chiba
2023	April	Asaka, Saitama, Ashiya, Hyogo, Chiba, Chiba, Kaizu, Gifu, Kasukabe, Saitama, Kōshi, Kumamoto, Maibara, Shiga, Matsudo, Chiba,Nachikatsuura, Wakayama, Namegawa, Saitama, Niiza, Saitama, Sapporo, Shiki, Saitama, Takasago, Hyōgo
2023	May	Morioka, Iwate
2023	August	Sanda, Hyōgo
2023	September	Miyako, Iwate, Takamatsu, Kagawa
2023	October	Tottori Prefecture, Hashimoto, Wakayama, Kurayoshi, Tottori, Nirasaki, Yamanashi, Shingū, Wakayama
2023	November	Yorii, Saitama
2023	December	Hayashima, Okayama
2024	January	Daisen, Tottori, Izumisano, Osaka, Misasa, Tottori, Niigata, Niigata, Takarazuka, Hyogo, Yazu, Tottori
2024	February	Chichibu, Saitama, Jōetsu, Niigata, Kōnan, Aichi, Nagareyama, Chiba
2024	March	Hanyū, Saitama, Murakami, Niigata, Ogose, Saitama, Owariasahi, Aichi
2024	April	Aichi Prefecture, Akaiwa, Okayama, Anjō, Aichi, Fusō, Aichi, Higashiura, Aichi, Hiraizumi, Iwate, Inuyama, Aichi, Kasai, Hyōgo, Kawagoe, Saitama, Kimitsu, Chiba, Kiyosu, Aichi, Kuji, Iwate, Kushimoto, Wakayama, Ōfunato, Iwate, Ōguchi, Aichi, Rikuzentakata, Iwate, Shisō, Hyōgo, Shiwa, Iwate, Sodegaura, Chiba, Tahara, Aichi, Taketoyo, Aichi, Tenri, Nara, Tōkai, Aichi, Toyohashi, Aichi, Uchiko, Ehime, Zentsūji, Kagawa
2024	May	Minamisōma, Fukushima
2024	June	Kōka, Shiga, Minamichita, Aichi
2024	July	Fukushima, Fukushima, Shibata, Niigata, Toyokawa, Aichi
2024	August	Kizugawa, Kyoto
2024	September	Motomiya, Fukushima, Tainai, Niigata
2024	October	Futtsu, Chiba

== List of mutual recognition agreements ==
The following is a list of agreements of mutual recognition of partnership oath registries between jurisdictions (Japanese: パートナーシップ制度の相互利用連携, pātonāshippu seido no sōgo riyō renkei).

2019	October 30	Fukuoka and Kumamoto
2019	December 2	Yokosuka, Zushi and Kamakura (Kanagawa)
2020	January 1	Mihara and Hiroshima (Hiroshima)
2020	March	Iwate Prefecture with all internal municipalities
2020	March 1	Yokohama and Sagamihara (Kanagawa)
2020	April 1	Fuchū (town) and Hiroshima (Hiroshima); Hatsukaichi and Hiroshima (Hiroshima)
2020	July	Okayama and Sōja (Okayama)
2020	July 1	Yokosuka, Zushi, Kamakura and Hayama (Kanagawa)
2020	November	Okayama, Okayama and Fukuoka, Fukuoka
2020	October 1	Fuchū (city) and Hiroshima (Hiroshima); Hiroshima and Kaita (Hiroshima)
2020	November 1	Yokohama and Isehara (Kanagawa), Yokohama and Fujisawa (Kanagawa),
2020	December 1	Yokohama and Yokosuka (Kanagawa)
2021	January	Okayama, Okayama and Hiroshima, Hiroshima
2021	January 1	Yokosuka, Zushi, Kamakura, Hayama and Miura (Kanagawa); Hiroshima and Miyoshi (Hiroshima)
2021	February 1	Yokohama, Kanagawa and Chiba, Chiba
2021	April	Amagasaki, Ashiya, Inagawa, Itami, Kawanishi, Nishinomiya, Sanda and Takarazuka (Hyogo)
2021	April 1	Fukuoka, Fukuoka and Hiroshima, Hiroshima; Higashihiroshima and Hiroshima (Hiroshima)
2021	May	Adachi, Bunkyō, Edogawa, Fuchū, Koganei, Kokubunji, Kunitachi, Minato, Nakano, Setagaya, Shibuya and Toshima (Tokyo)
2021	June	Katano and Hirakata (Osaka)
2021	July	Chiba, Funabashi, Ichikawa, Matsudo, Kashiwa, and Narashino (Chiba)
2021	September 27	Akitakata and Hiroshima (Hiroshima)
2022	February 1	Chigasaki, Fujisawa and Samukawa (Kanagawa)
2022	August 18	Saga Prefecture and Ibaraki Prefecture
2022	November	Tokyo Metropolis with all internal municipalities
2022	November 24	Saga Prefecture and Fukuoka Prefecture
2022	December 20	Ibaraki, Tochigi and Gunma prefectures
2023	January 31	Ibaraki Prefecture and Mie Prefecture
2023	September 21	Ibaraki Prefecture and Tochigi Prefecture
2023	October 29	Fujisawa, Yokohama and Isehara (Kanagawa)
2023	October 30	Ibaraki Prefecture and Saitama, Saitama
2024	February 14	Yamato, Ebina, Zama, and Ayase (Kanagawa)
2024	February 22	Gifu Prefecture and Mie Prefecture
2024	March 1	Kasugai, Komaki, Toyoyama (Aichi)
2024	April	Kyoto with Fukuchiyama City, Ayabe City, Kameoka City, Muko City, Nagaokakyo City, Nantan City, Oyamazaki Town (Kyoto); Osaka Prefecture, Osaka City, Sakai City, Ikeda (Osaka); Amagasaki City, Nishinomiya City, Ashiya City, Itami City, Takarazuka City, Kawanishi City, Sanda City, Tamba Sasayama City, Tamba City, Awaji City, Inagawa Town (Hyogo); Abashiri, Shari, Kiyosato, Koshimizu, Ōzora, Kushiro, and Muroran (Hokkaido).
2024	September 4	Okayama City, Soja City, Kasaoka City, Setouchi City, Bizen City, Akaiwa City, Ibara City, Maniwa City, Mimasaka City, Hayashima Town, and Wake Town (Okayama)

== Extension to opposite-sex relationships ==
Some jurisdictions extend partnership oath registries to common-law marriages, in which opposite-sex couples enter live-in relationships without civil registration of marriage. Such protections allow for certification of opposite-sex couples who do not wish to be subject to several mandates regarding marriage, including the legal requirement to share the husband's surname. Tokyo became the first prefecture-level jurisdiction to allow common-law couples to enter partnerships. In April 2024, Aichi Prefecture became the first prefecture-level familyship system to be extended to opposite-sex couples.

== Statistics ==
The first couple to receive a partnership certificate were Koyuki Higashi and Hiroko Masuhara in Shibuya on 5 November 2015. They were personally congratulated by Mayor Ken Hasebe. Later that day, Setagaya issued certificates to seven couples. By April 2017, 17 same-sex partnership certificates had been issued in Shibuya.

319 certificates had been issued in Japan by November 2018. This had increased to 617 by October 2019, to 1,052 by June 2020, to 1,301 by November 2020, to 2,018 by July 2021, and to 3,168 by June 2022, with most being issued in Osaka Prefecture followed by Tokyo, Kanagawa and Chiba prefectures.

As of 1 November 2023, residents in 890 total municipalities are eligible to register their partnerships with a municipal or prefecture government's registry, out of 1,719 total municipalities. All 20 designated cities and 28 out of 62 core cities offer municipal partnership registries, while 18 other core cities are covered by existing prefectural registries and 3 others are set to be covered by 2024. 26 of 47 prefectural capitals offer municipal partnership registries, while 11 other prefectural capitals or seats of government are covered by prefectural partnership registries.

Partnership statistics as of June 2022

=== Private-sector partnerships ===
As a private sector response to the lack of national recognition of same-sex partnerships, the Famiee Project created a digital blockchain-secured partnership registry in 2019. In order to receive a Famiee certificate, the couple must apply via a mobile app and will receive a digital certificate to be used as proof of familial status. The Famiee Project received the backing of at least 17 companies who will recognize the digital partnership certificate and treat a couple the same as a different-sex couple for banking and insurance purposes. The partnerships are not currently recognized by the Government of Japan, but aim to create pressure from the private sector for political action to expand LGBT rights in the country.

== See also ==
- Recognition of same-sex unions in Japan
- Homosexuality in Japan
- Marriage in Japan
- LGBT rights in Japan
  - LGBT rights in Tokyo
  - LGBT rights in Ibaraki Prefecture
- Recognition of same-sex unions in Asia
- Right to Care card, similar registration system in the Philippines
