= Owariasahi =

Owariasahi 尾張旭市
- City
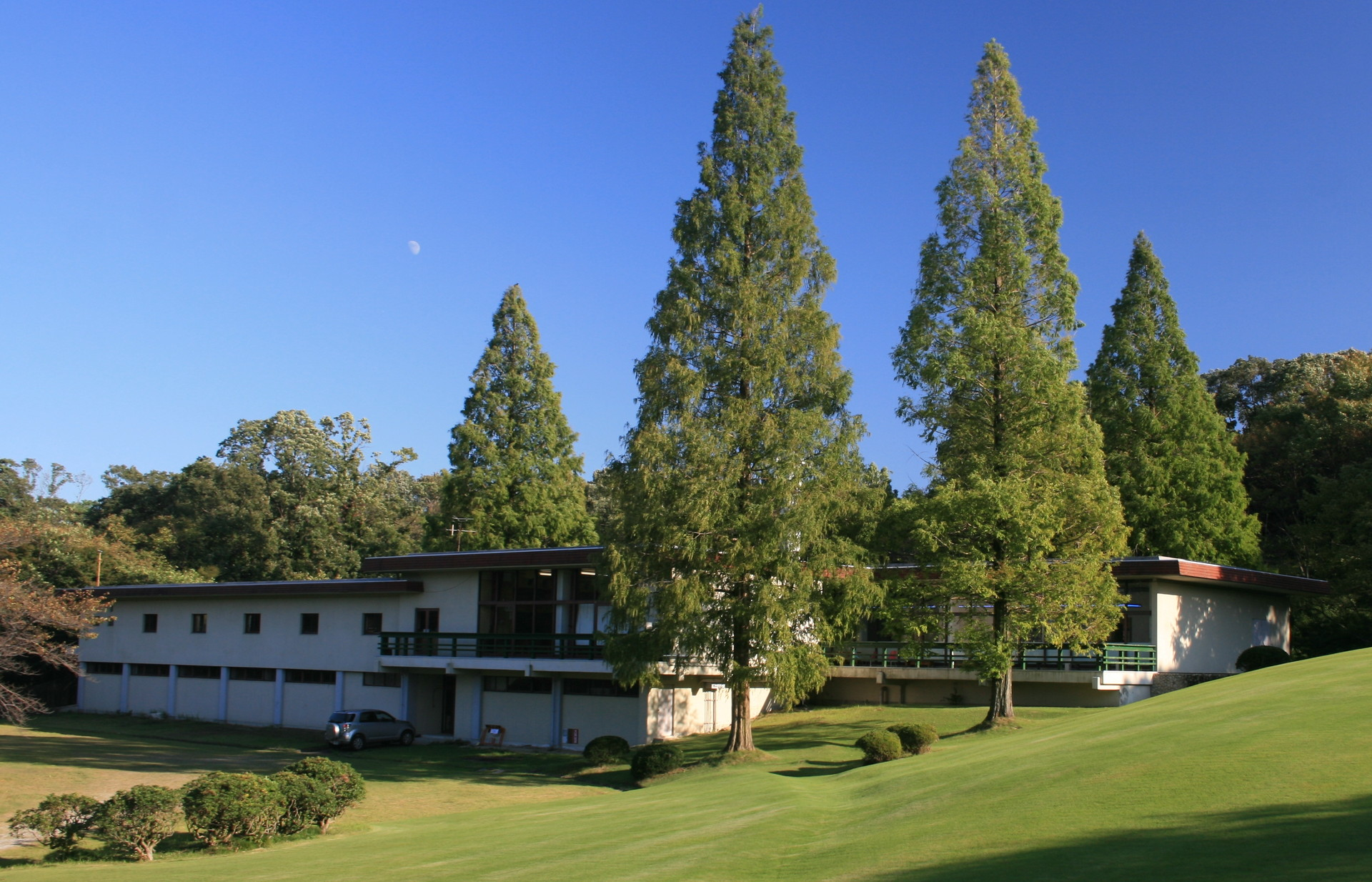
- Aichiken Forest Park

- Flag Seal

- Location of Owariasahi in Aichi Prefecture

- Coordinates: 35°12′59.5″N 137°02′7.3″E
- Country: Japan
- Region: Chūbu (Tōkai)
- Prefecture: Aichi

Government
  - - Mayor: Kazumi Mori

Area
  - Total: 21.03 km^{2} (8.12 sq mi)

Population (October 1, 2019)
  - Total: 81,954
  - Density: 3,897/km^{2} (10,090/sq mi)
- Time zone: UTC+9 (Japan Standard Time)
- Tree: Camphor laurel
- Flower: Sunflower
- Phone number: 0561-53-2111
- Address: 2600-1 Hadara, Higashi-Ōmichi-chō, Owariasahi-shi, Aichi-ken 488-8666
- Website: Official website

Owariasahi (尾張旭市, Owariasahi-shi; Japanese pronunciation: [ò̞.β̞ä́.ɾʲí.ä́.sä̀.çì, -sä́.çi̥.ɕì]) is a city located in Aichi Prefecture, Japan. As of 1 October 2019, the city had an estimated population of 81,954 in 35,583 households, and a population density of 3,897 persons per km². The total area of the city is 21.03 square kilometres (8.12 sq mi).

== Geography ==
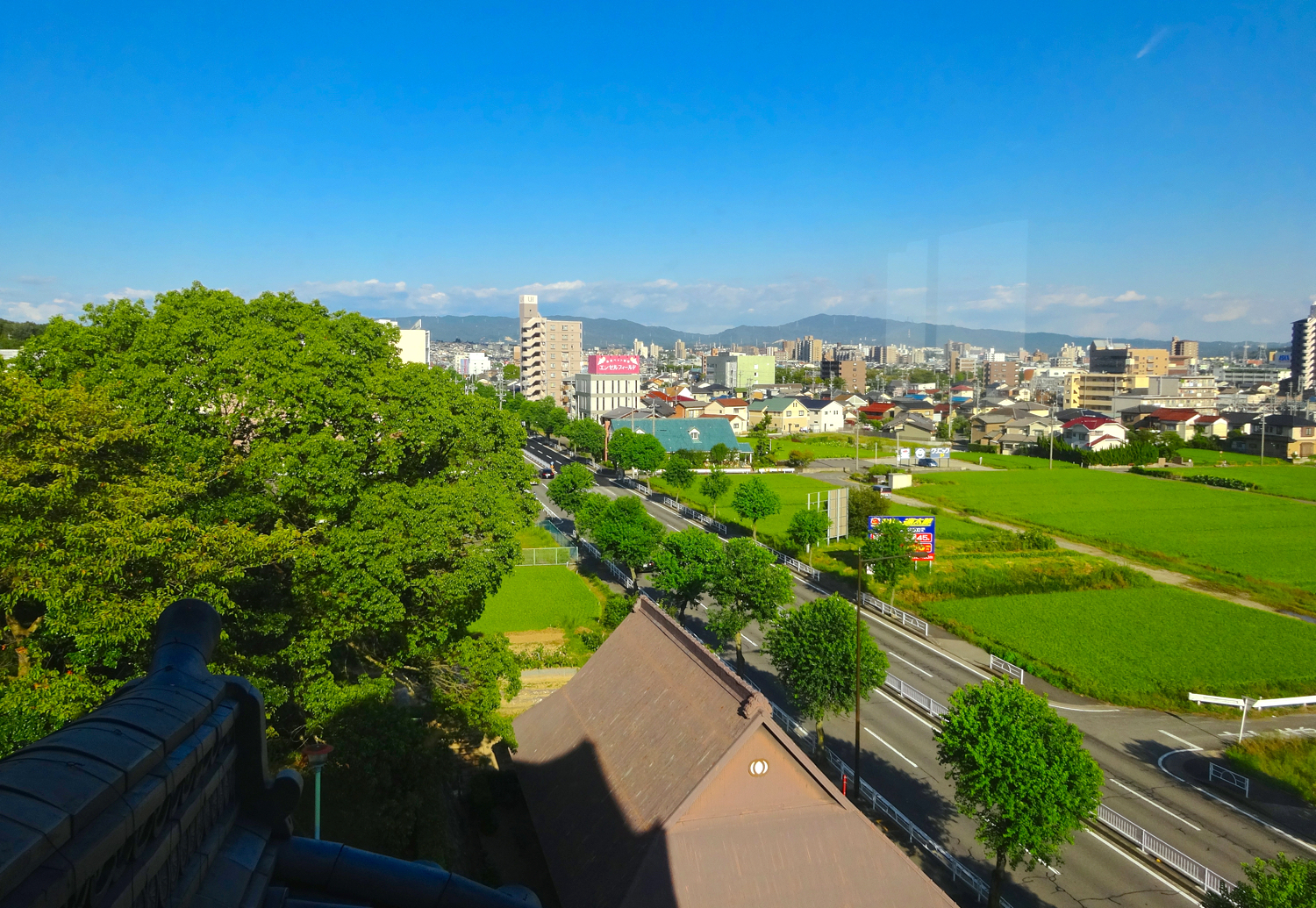
Skyline of Owariasahi

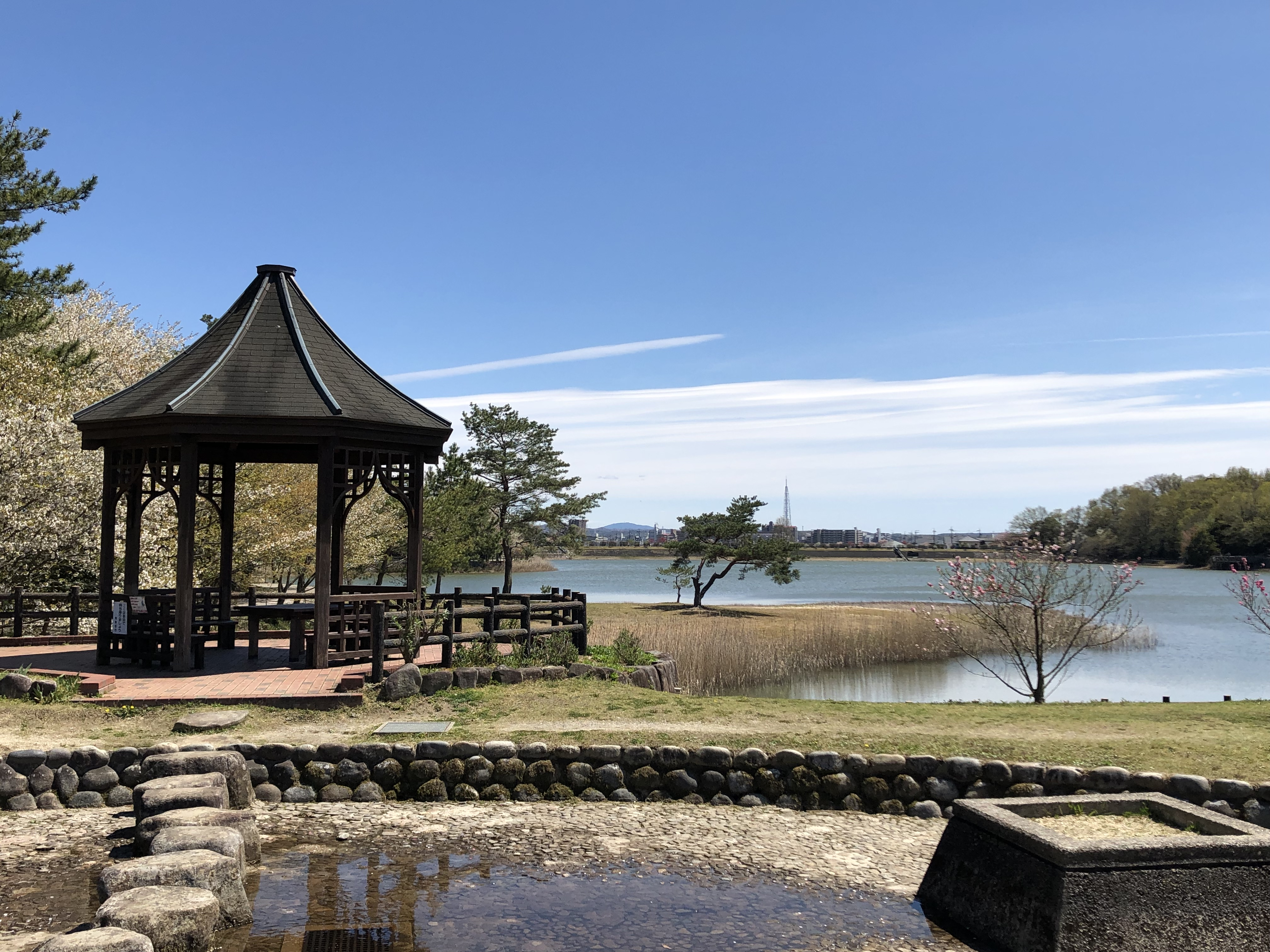
Ima Pond

Owariasahi is located in west-central Aichi Prefecture, north of the Nagoya metropolis. The Aichi Prefectural Forest Park covers approximately 15% of its area.

=== Climate ===
The city has a climate characterized by hot and humid summers, and relatively mild winters (Köppen climate classification Cfa). The average annual temperature in Owariasahi is 15.5 °C. The average annual rainfall is 1665 mm with September as the wettest month. The temperatures are highest on average in August, at around 28.0 °C, and lowest in January, at around 4.0 °C.

=== Demographics ===
Per Japanese census data, the population of Owariasahi has been increasing rapidly over the past 50 years.

Historical population
Year	Pop.	±%
1940	8,082	—
1950	12,040	+49.0%
1960	18,577	+54.3%
1970	33,634	+81.1%
1980	53,151	+58.0%
1990	65,675	+23.6%
2000	75,066	+14.3%
2010	81,143	+8.1%

=== Surrounding municipalities ===
Aichi Prefecture

- Nagakute
- Nagoya (Moriyama-ku)
- Seto

== History ==
=== Late modern period ===
During the early Meiji period establishment of the modern municipalities system, the villages of Inba, Arai, and Yatsushiro were created within Higashikasugai District, Aichi. The three villages merged to form the village of Asahi on July 16, 1906.

=== Contemporary history ===
Asahi was proclaimed a town on August 5, 1948. Asahi was raised to city status on December 1, 1970. In order to prevent confusion with the city of Asahi, Chiba or the town of Asahi, Aichi, the new city was named Owariasahi.

== Government ==
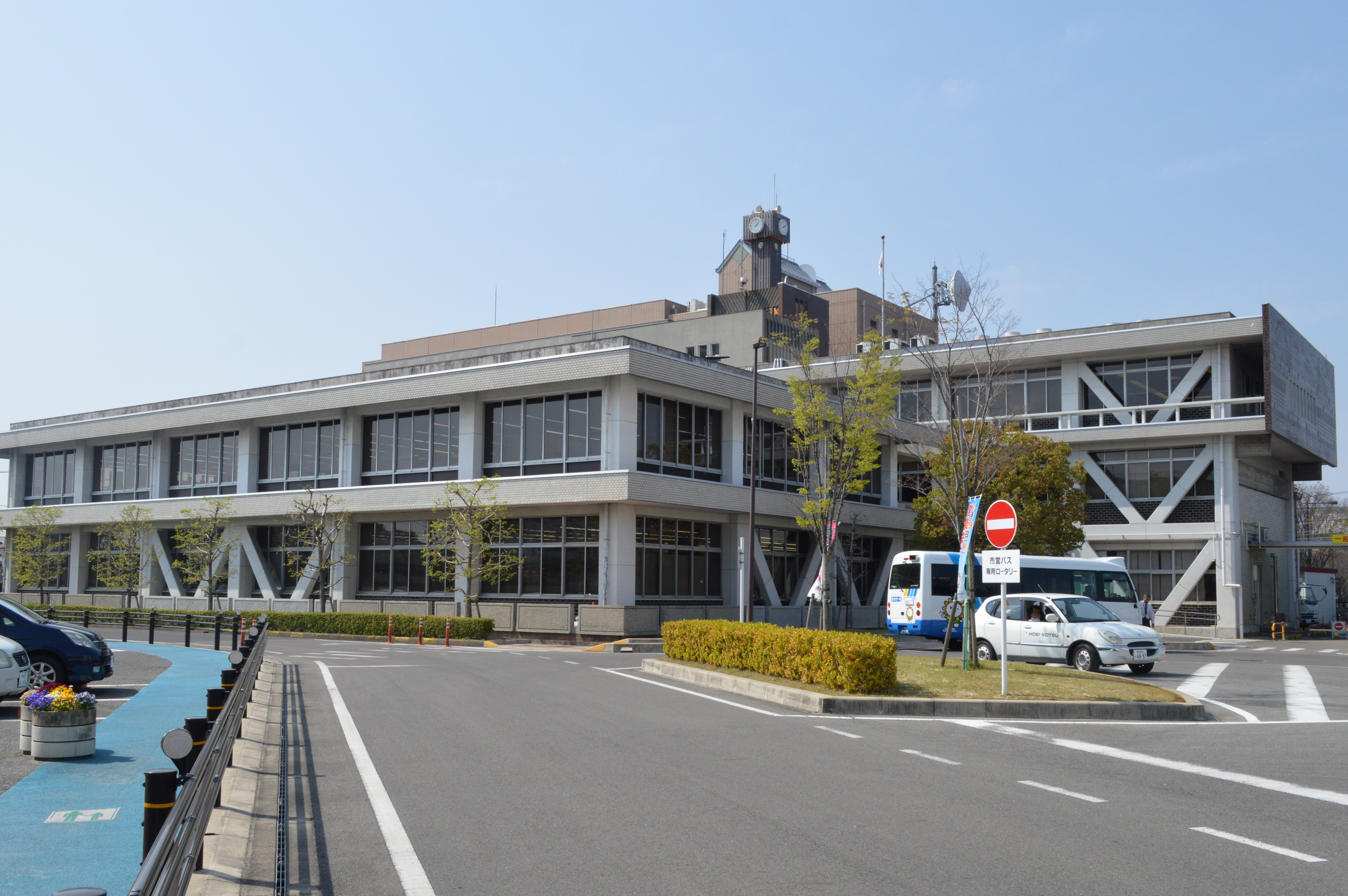
Owariasahi City hall

Owariasahi has a mayor-council form of government with a directly elected mayor and a unicameral city legislature of 20 members. The city contributes one member to the Aichi Prefectural Assembly. In terms of national politics, the city is part of Aichi District 7 of the lower house of the Diet of Japan.

== Sister cities ==
- Wajima, Ishikawa Prefecture, since July 18, 2012

== Education ==
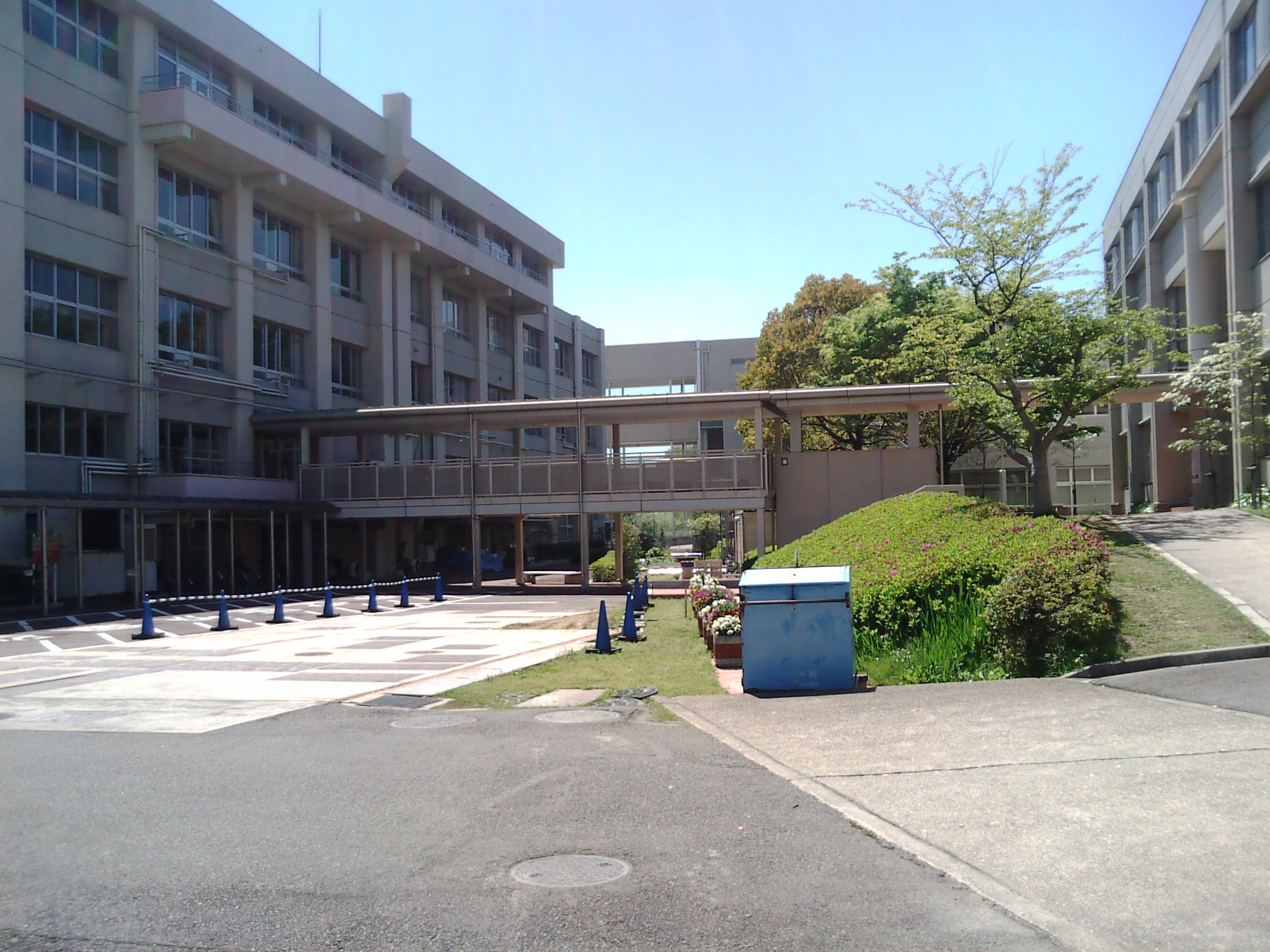
Nagoya Sangyo University

=== University ===
- Nagoya Sangyo University

=== College ===
- Nagoya Management Junior College

=== Schools ===
- Owariasahi has nine public elementary schools and three public junior high schools operated by the city government, and one public high school operated by the Aichi Prefectural Board of Education.

== Transportation ==
=== Railways ===
==== Conventional lines ====
Meitetsu

- Seto Line: - Inba - Asahi-mae - Owari Asahi - Sangō -

=== Roads ===
==== Expressway ====
- Tōmei Expressway

==== Japan National Route ====
- National Route 363

== Local attractions ==
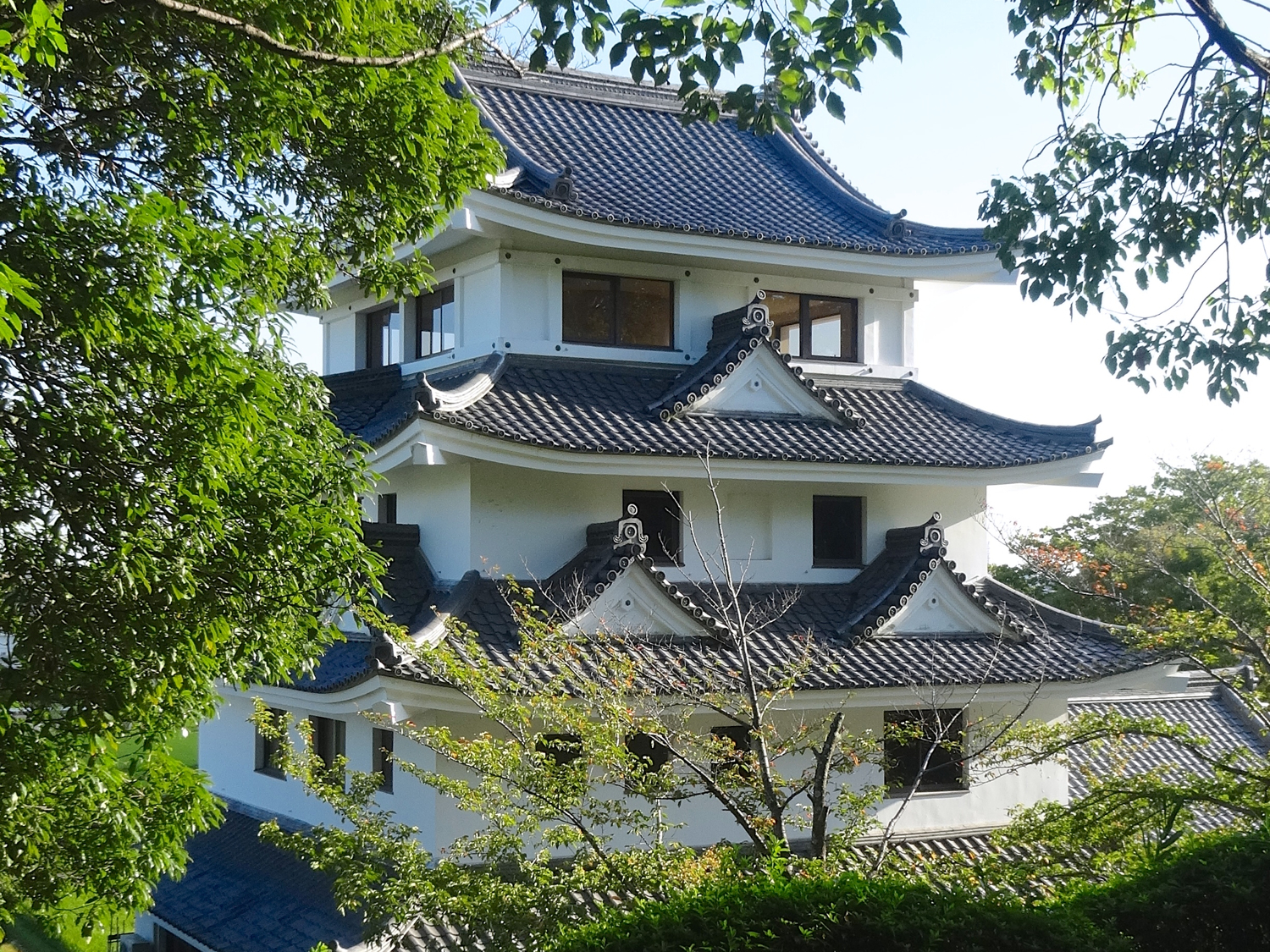
Asahi Castle

=== Historic sites ===
- Shiroyama Park
  - Asahi Castle
  - Skyward Asahi

=== Parks ===
- Aichiken Forest Park
- Ima Pond
- Obata Greens

== Notable people from Owariasahi ==
- Hiromitsu Kanehara, mixed martial artist
- Hiroto Takahashi, baseball player (Chunichi Dragons)
