= Nagoya Sangyo University =

- 名古屋産業大学
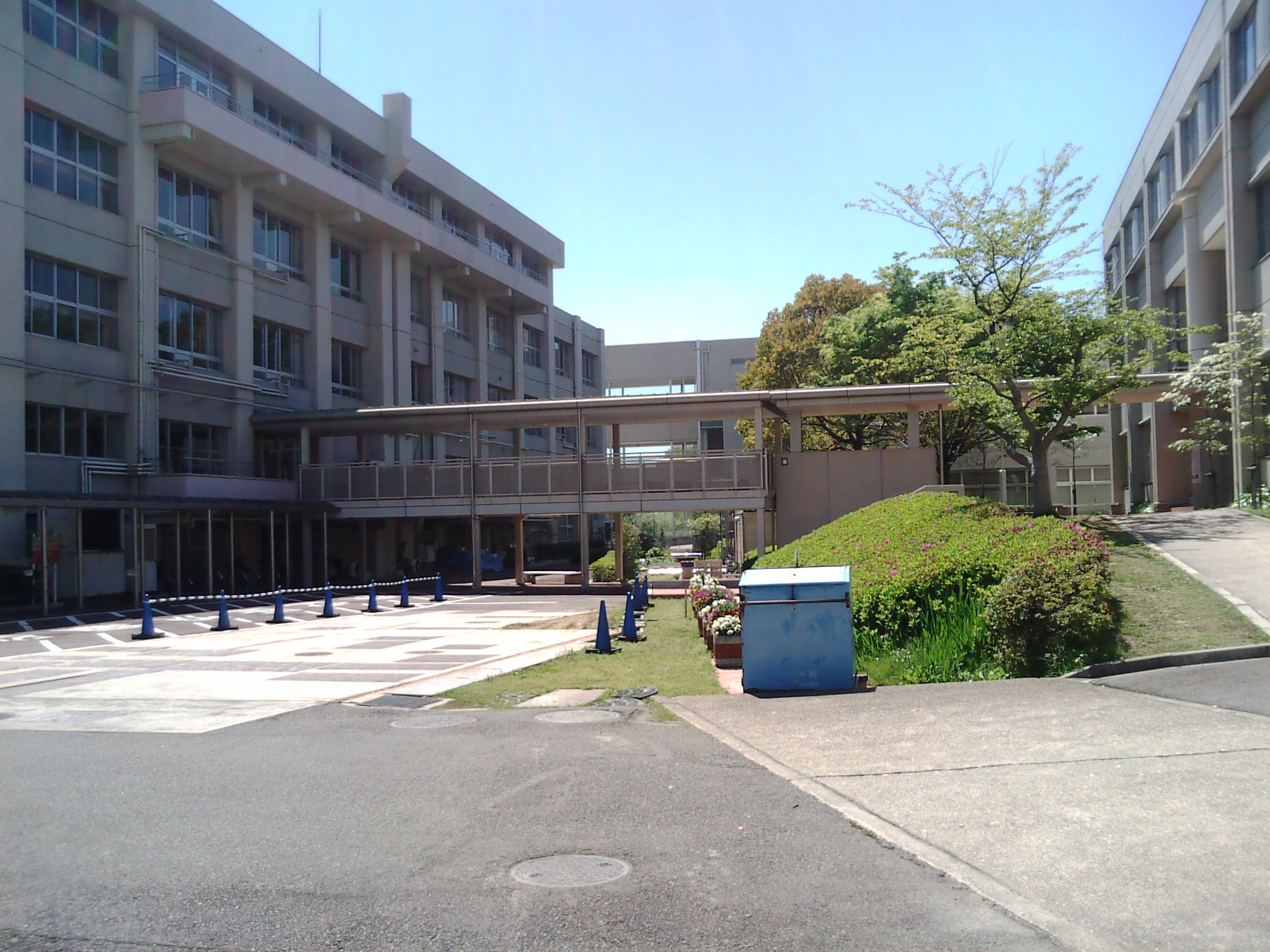
- Type: Private
- Established: 1965
- Location: Owariasahi, Aichi, Japan; 35.2196°N 137.0311°E
- Website: www.nagoya-su.ac.jp (in Japanese)

Nagoya Sangyo University (名古屋産業大学, Nagoya sangyō daigaku) is a private university in Owariasahi, Aichi, Japan. The school was first founded as a junior college in 1965, and it became a four-year college in 2000.
