= Ulysses pact =

Freely made decision designed and intended to bind oneself in the future

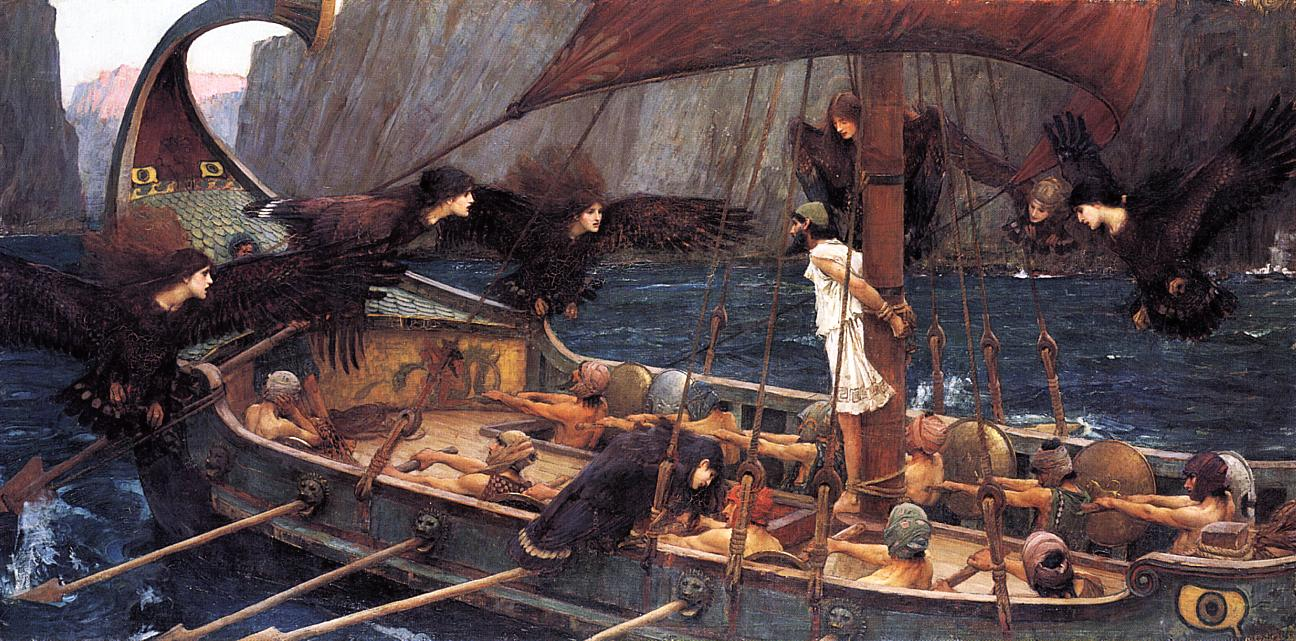
Ulysses and the Sirens, painting by John William Waterhouse

A Ulysses pact or Ulysses contract is a freely made decision that is designed and intended to bind oneself in the future. The term is used in medicine, especially in reference to advance directives (also known as living wills), where there is some controversy over whether a decision made by a person in one state of health should be considered binding upon that person when they are in a markedly different, usually worse, state of health.

The term refers to the pact that Ulysses (Greek name Ὀδυσσεύς, Odysseus) made with his men as they approached the Sirens. Ulysses wanted to hear the Sirens' song although he knew that doing so would render him incapable of rational thought. On Circe's advice, he put wax in his men's ears so that they could not hear and had them tie him to the mast so that he could not jump into the sea. He ordered them not to change course under any circumstances and to keep their swords upon him and to attack him if he should break free of his bonds.

Upon hearing the Sirens' song, Ulysses was driven temporarily insane and struggled with all of his might to break free so that he might join the Sirens, which would have meant his death. His men, however, kept their promise, and they refused to release him.

== Psychiatric context ==
Psychiatric advance directives are sometimes referred to as Ulysses pacts or Ulysses contracts, where there is a legal agreement designed to override a present request from a legally incompetent patient in favor of a past request made by that previously competent patient. An example of when Ulysses contracts are invoked is when people with schizophrenia stop taking their medication at perceived remission times.

== Technological context ==
In the wake of the Snowden revelations, digital technology companies and commentators have had to consider the situation of a technology provider being ordered by a government to act in a way that they feel morally opposed to. One example is that Apple, as part of the FBI–Apple encryption dispute, decided to engineer the iPhone in a way that made it impossible for them to read the data on it, which has been described as "a digital Ulysses pact". A related example is that of a warrant canary, which Cory Doctorow describes as being a Ulysses pact (albeit a "weak" one, since the issuer of the canary can fail or be forced not to kill the canary), as is binary transparency (applying the idea of certificate transparency to binary executable files), which he describes as a "much stronger, more effective Ulysses pact", since a public append-only log is harder to censor.

== Policy context ==
Ulysses clauses in public policy are provisions that discourage or prevent future changes. For example, in the state of California initiatives generally include a Ulysses clause to prevent amendments.

== See also ==
- Advance health care directive
- Decision theory
- Greek mythology
- Escalation of commitment

== Bibliography ==
- Radden, Jennifer (1994). "Second thoughts: Revoking decisions over one's own future". Philosophy and Phenomenological Research. 54 (4). International Phenomenological Society: 787–801. doi:10.2307/2108410. JSTOR 2108410.
- Feinberg, Joel (1986). Harm to self: The moral limits of the criminal law. Vol. 3. New York: Oxford University Press.
- Fried, Charles (1970). An Anatomy of Values: Problems of Personal and Social Choice. Cambridge: Harvard University Press. ISBN 978-0-674-33248-5.
- Schelling, Thomas C (1984). Choice and Consequence. Cambridge: Harvard University Press. ISBN 0-674-12770-6.
