= Aichi Prefectural University =

University in Nagakutei, Japan

- 愛知県立大学
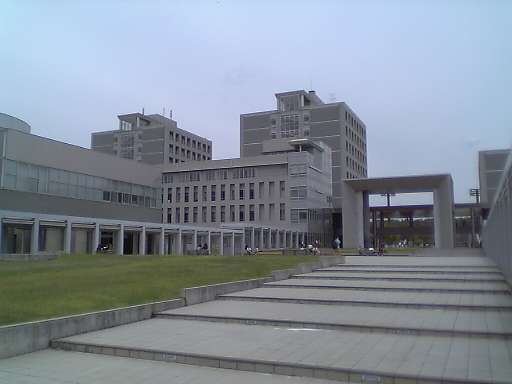
- Aichi Prefectural University
- Type: Public
- Established: 1947
- Location: Nagakute, Aichi, Japan; 35.182°N 137.087°E
- Website: www.aichi-pu.ac.jp/eng/

Aichi Prefectural University (愛知県立大学, Aichi kenritsu daigaku) is a public university located in the city of Nagakute, Aichi, Japan. There is a campus in Moriyama-ku, Nagoya which is for the nursing school, namely Aichi Prefectural College of Nursing & Health. The predecessor of the school was founded in 1947, and it was chartered as a university in 1966.

Faculty at Aichi Prefectural University have included pianist Soichiro Matsumoto and archaeologist Saburo Sugiyama. Composer Miyuki Ito is an alumna. In 2008, Radford University in Virginia partnered with Aichi Prefectural University for an exchange program.
