= Yutorito Line =

Guided busway in Nagoya, Japan

Guideway Bus Shidami Line

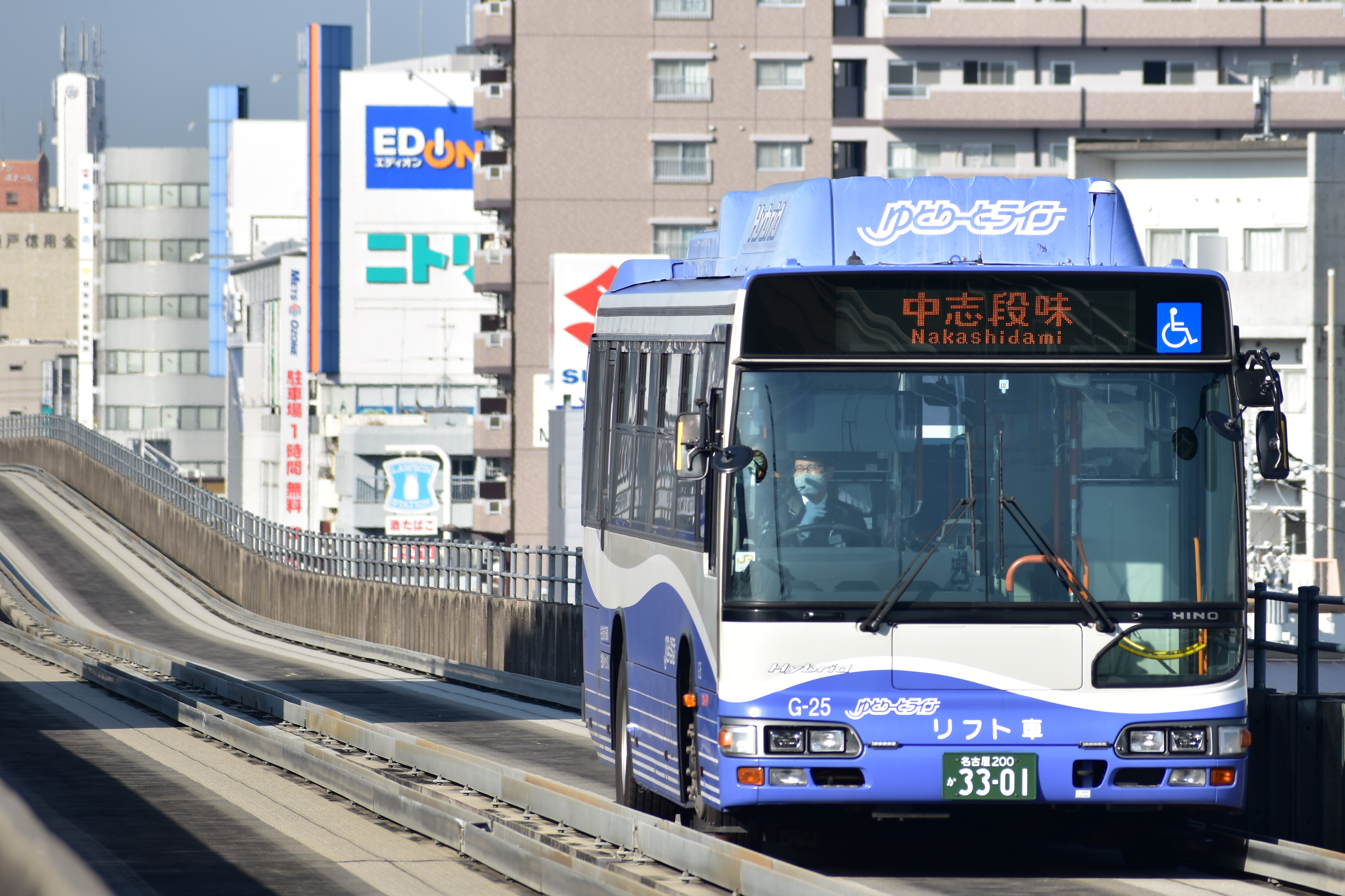

Overview
- Operator: Nagoya GuideWay-Bus Co., Ltd.
- Status: Operational
- Began service: 23 March 2001
- Former operators: Meitetsu Bus; JR Tokai Bus Company

Routes
- Routes: 4
- Locale: Nagoya
- Start: Ōzone
- End: Obata Ryokuchi
- Length: 6.5 km (4.0 mi)
- Stations: 9

The Yutorito Line (ゆとりーとライン, Yutorīto Rain) is guided bus and bus rapid transit line in Nagoya, Aichi, Japan. The line is officially named the Guideway Bus Shidami Line (ガイドウェイバス志段味線, Gaidowei Basu Shidami-sen). The name "Yutorito" is a portmanteau of yutori (ゆとり; "relaxed") and street (ストリート, sutorīto).

The line is owned by Nagoya Guideway Bus Company (名古屋ガイドウェイバス株式会社, Nagoya Gaiowei Basu kabushiki gaisha), itself owned by the City of Nagoya Municipal Government, Development Bank of Japan, Meitetsu (Nagoya Railroad), JR Tokai Bus Company, and MUFG Bank. It opened on 23 March 2001.

== Overview ==
The line consists of a guided bus segment on a viaduct dedicated track in central Nagoya and an ordinary bus segment on public roads. Vehicles go directly between the two segments via a curved ramp. The guided bus segment runs between Ōzone in Higashi Ward and Obata Ryokuchi in Moriyama Ward. Nagoya Guideway Bus Co. manages the guideway facilities and cars, while Nagoya Municipal Bus operates buses on the line.

The Yutorito Line is the only guided bus line in Japan. The line is legally considered to be a type of railway, with the elevated section treated as a type of tram. The operation of the line thus adheres to the laws of the Railway Business Act, similar to monorails and automated guideway transit in the country.

Previously, Meitetsu Bus and JR Central Bus also operated buses on the line. The two operators withdrew from the line on 1 October 2009.

== Basic data ==
The data below is about the elevated, guided bus segment.

- Distance: 6.5 km (4.0 mi)
- Stations: 9
- Double-track line: Whole line
- Motive energy: Internal combustion engine

== Routes ==
There are 4 routes operated, each on different normal bus segments.

- Ōzone – Obata Ryokuchi
- Ōzone – Obata Ryokuchi – Nakashidami
- Ōzone – Obata Ryokuchi – Shidami Science Park – Nakashidami
- Ōzone – Obata Ryokuchi – Kōzōji

== Stations ==
The data below is about the elevated, guided bus segment.

No.	Station name	Japanese	Distance (km)	Transfers	Location
Y01	Ōzone	大曽根	0.0	JR Central: Chūō Main Line; Meitetsu: Seto Line; Nagoya Municipal Subway: Meijō Line (M12)	Higashi-ku, Nagoya
Y02	Nagoya Dome-mae Yada	ナゴヤドーム前矢田	1.0	Nagoya Municipal Subway: Meijō Line (M13)	Higashi-ku, Nagoya
Y03	Sunada-bashi	砂田橋	1.6	Nagoya Municipal Subway: Meijō Line (M14)	Higashi-ku, Nagoya
Y04	Moriyama	守山	2.7	Meitetsu: Seto Line (unofficial at Moriyama-Jieitai-Mae Station)	Moriyama-ku, Nagoya
Y05	Kanaya	金屋	3.3		Moriyama-ku, Nagoya
Y06	Kawamiya	川宮	4.3		Moriyama-ku, Nagoya
Y07	Kawamura	川村	5.1		Moriyama-ku, Nagoya
Y08	Shirasawa Keikoku	白沢渓谷	6.0		Moriyama-ku, Nagoya
Y09	Obata Ryokuchi	小幡緑地	6.5		Moriyama-ku, Nagoya
Through services to/from ordinary bus routes.

== See also ==
- Guided bus
- Bus rapid transit
- List of railway lines in Japan
- List of town tramway systems in Japan

== Notes ==
1. This website is geoblocked and may not be accessible from certain regions.
