= Shidami Kofun group =

Cluster of burial mounds in Japan

- 志段味古墳群 (Japanese)
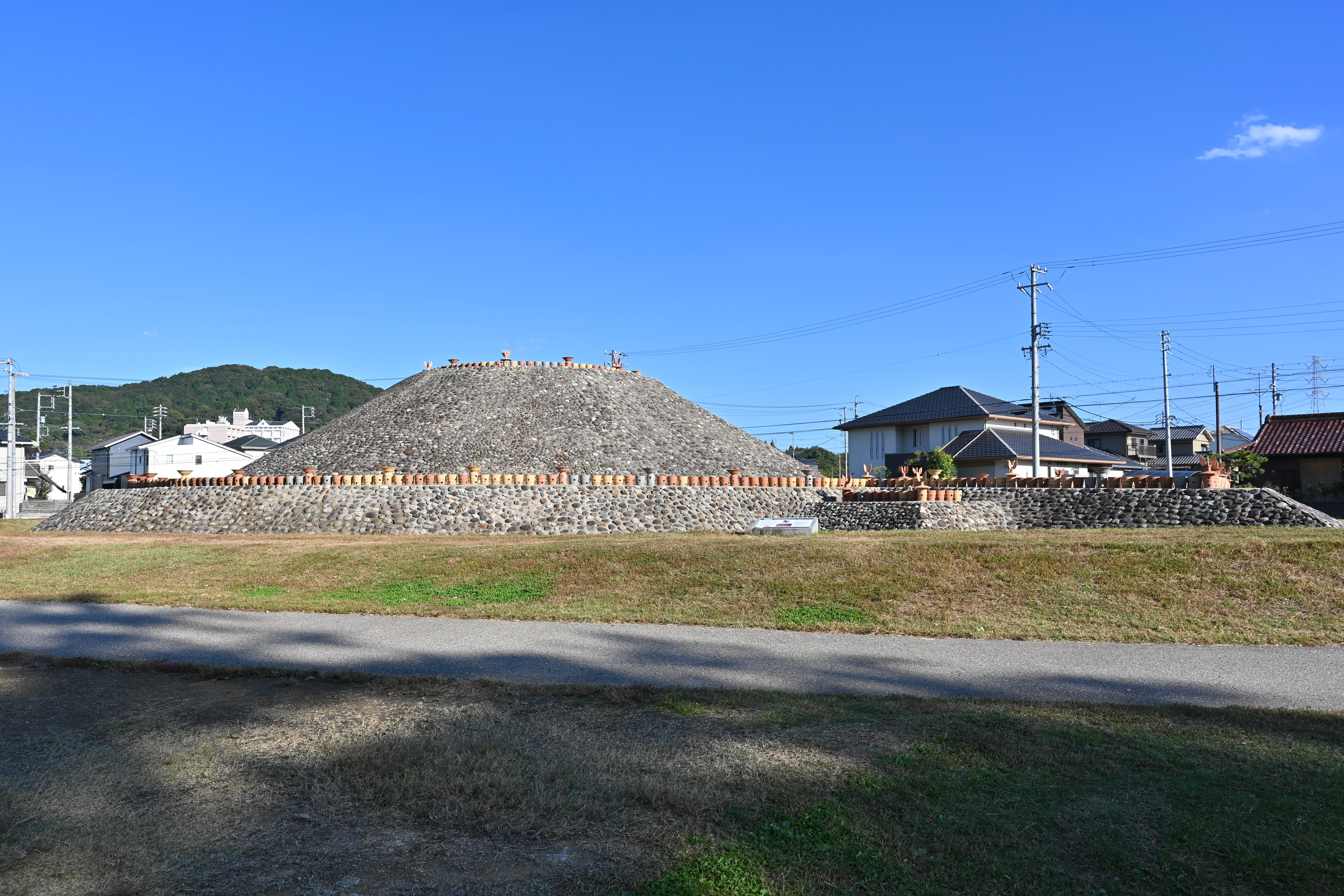
- Shidami Otsuka Kofun

- Shidami Kofun group Shidami Kofun group (Japan)
- 35°15′17.19″N 137°02′40.89″E
- Type: Kofun
- Periods: Kofun period
- Location: Moriyama-ku, Nagoya, Japan
- Region: Tōkai region

Site notes
- Public access: Yes, on-site museum

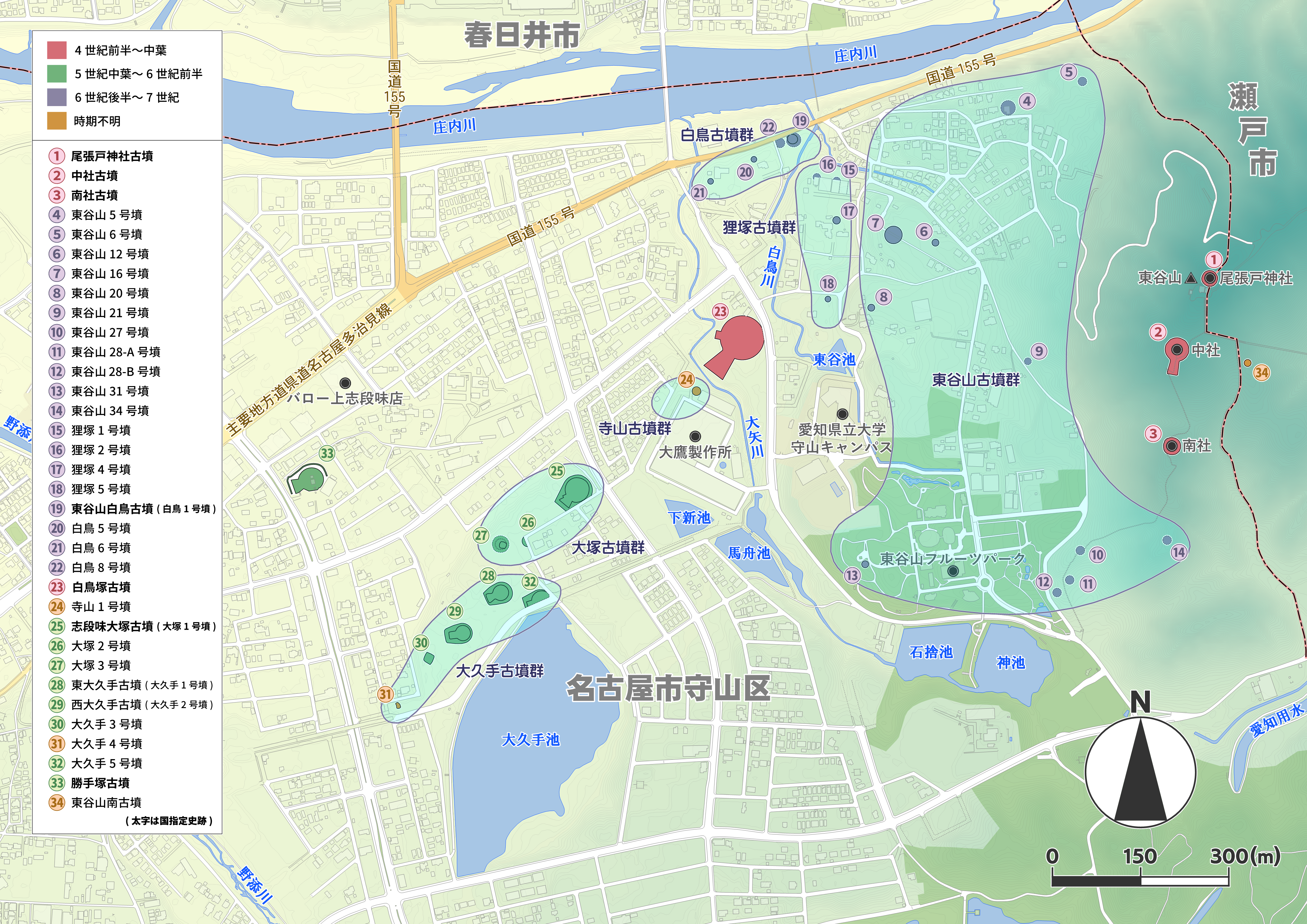
Map of Shidami Kofun group

Shidami Kofun group (志段味古墳群, Shidami Kofun gun) is a cluster of seven Kofun period burial mounds, located in what is now part of Moriyama-ku, Nagoya, Aichi Prefecture in the Tōkai region of Japan. The Shiratorizuka Kofun was designated a National Historic Site of Japan in 1972 and the remaining six were added to the designation in 2014.

== Overview ==
Many kofun were once located on both sides of the Shonai River, stretching from Moriyama Ward of Nagoya into the neighboring cities of Seto and Owariasahi. However, much of the area was used as a maneuvering training ground by the Imperial Japanese Army before World War II, and was subsequently developed into housing in the post-war era. Of the over 66 kofun once recorded in the area, 33 survive. These tombs were built between the 4th and 7th century AD, and consist of various styles, including keyhole-shaped, domed, and scallop-shaped mounds. The area is preserved as an archaeological park with a museum, the Experience! Shidami Kofun Group Museum (体感！しだみ古墳群ミュージアム, taikan! Shidami kofun-gun myūjiamu) The tombs covered under the National Historic Site designation are:

== Shiratorizuka Kofun ==
The Shiratorizuka Kofun (白鳥塚古墳) is the 3rd largest in Aichi Prefecture and dates from the late 4th century. The is one of several kofun in various locations which claim to be the grave of the semi-legendary folk hero Yamato Takeru. It is a zenpō-kōen-fun (前方後円墳), which is shaped like a keyhole, having one square end and one circular end, when viewed from above. No trace of haniwa has been discovered, but the tumulus was originally covered with fukiishi river stones, and white silica stones were used at the top of the posterior circular portion, giving the tumulus the appearance of a white bird. It maintained this appearance to the end of the Edo period, but most of the stones have since disappeared and only traces remain today. In the Taisho period a portion of the posterior circle collapsed by 1.8 square meters, and suspecting that this was the location of the burial chamber, a local antiquarian attempted an excavation, but there is no record of any findings. The tumulus was designated a National Historic Site in 1972. The tumulus has been surveyed by Nagoya University in 1969 and 2005, and it has been confirmed to have been built in two tiers in the anterior portion, and three tiers in the posterior portion. The interior has not been excavated. The anterior portion is distorted, but it was not determined if this was intentional, or due to erosion. Another survey in 1992 revealed the existence of a moat of the southeast side of the anterior portion, and the area covered under National Historic Site protection was expanded in 2008.

Total length
115 meters:
Anterior rectangular portion
43 meters long x 40 meters wide. 6.7 meters high (north side) / 5 meters high (south side)
Constriction width
25 meters
Posterior circular portion
75 meter diameter x 15.2 meters high (north side) / 12.6 meters high (south side)

== Owaribe Jinja Kofun ==
The Owaribe Jinja Kofun (尾張戸神社古墳) is a circular-type (empun (円墳)) tumulus located under the main shrine of Owaribe Shrine. It has been tentatively dated to the early 4th century, as it does not have haniwa, and the fukiishi are similar to that of the Shiratorizuka Kofun. It has a diameter of 27.5 meters. There has also been debate as to whether or not this was once a keyhole-shaped tumulus which has lost its rectangular portion. In June 2008, the first exploratory excavation survey was conducted by the Cultural Property Protection Office of the Nagoya City Board of Education, and was found that the mound has two steps, but that most of the second step had been flattened to build the shrine. The first step is about 2 meters high from the hem of the mound, the slope is 30-35 degrees, and the fukiishi are mainly gravel. The base stones are about 30 centimeters in size, with 10-20 centimeters of gravel on the top. The first terrace was 1.2-1.4 meters wide and was covered with quartz gravel. In the second stage, only the base stone of about 30 cm and a part above it have been confirmed to remain. Records indicate that in 1935 grave robbers attempted to dig into the rear of the tumulus but found that the burial chamber was blocked by a megalith, which was probably the ceiling stone of a pit-type stone chamber. It received National Historic Site designation in 2014.

== Naka-Yashiro Kofun ==
The Naka-Yashiro Kofun (中社古墳) is a keyhole-shaped tumulus within the grounds of the Owaribe Shrine. It has a total length of 63.5 meters, and has both fukiishi and cylindrical-shaped haniwa. The cylindrical haniwa are the oldest found in the Tokai region, and show a strong influence from the southeastern part of Nara Prefecture. From these artifacts, its estimated date of construction is in the middle of the 4th century, or later than the Owaribe Jinja Kofun. It received National Historic Site designation in 2014.

== Minami-Yashiro Kofun ==
The Minami-Yashiro Kofun (南社古墳) is a circular type tumulus within the grounds of the Owaribe Shrine. As with the Owaribe Jinja Kofun, there has been speculation that this was originally a keyhole-shaped tumulus. It has a diameter of 30 meters, and had both fukiishi and haniwa. Its estimated date of construction is in the middle of the 4th century, an analysis has found that the haniwa were made at the same location and approximately the same time as th haniwa found at the Naka-Yashiro Kofun. The site received National Historic Site designation in 2014.

== Shidami Ōtsuka Kofun ==
The Shidami Ōtsuka Kofun (志段味大塚古墳) is a scallop-shaped tumulus hotategai-gata zenpō-kōen-fun (帆立貝形前方後円墳) with a total length of 55 meters and is orientated to the northeast. The mound is covered in fukiishi and many haniwa fragments were found. A horseshoe-shaped mound encircles most of the tumulus. It was excavated in 1923 by Kyoto Imperial University, and many grave goods were recovered from the burial chamber. These included a bronze mirror with five small bronze bells, haniwa shaped like birds or houses, and iron weapons and tools and trees of armor. It was resurveyed from 1982 to 1983, and from 2005, during which time a second burial chamber was discovered. This second burial chamber was 5.8 meters by 3 meters, and per vermillion pigment and lacquer found in the soil layer, once contained a red-painted wooden casket. The tumulus has been restored to what archaeologists believe to have been its original appearance. The site received National Historic Site designation in 2014.

Total length
55 meters (62 meters including moat)
Anterior rectangular portion
15 meters long x 1.5 meters high
Posterior circular portion
40 meter diameter x 7 meters high

== Kattezuka Kofun ==
The Kattezuka Kofun (志段味大塚古墳) is a scallop-type kofun with a total length of 53 meters. The top of the posterior circular portion is occupied by a small Shinto shrine. The tumulus shows traces of two-tier construction, and cylindrical haniwa and Sue pottery shards have been excavated, which date the structure to the 5th to early 6th century. The interior of the tumulus has not been excavated. The tumulus was surrounded by a double moat, of which only a portion of the inner moat in the west and north have survived. The site received National Historic Site designation in 2014.

Total length
53 meters (62 meters including moat)
Anterior rectangular portion
14 meters long x 21 meters wide x 2.3 meters high
Posterior circular portion
39 meter diameter x 6.5 meters high

== Tōgokusan Shirotori Kofun ==
The Tōgokusan Shirotori Kofun (東谷山白鳥古墳) is the largest of a cluster of eight tumuli along Japan National Route 155. It is an oblong-shaped tumulus with a diameter of 17.5 meters east–west by 16.5 meters north–south, and a height of 3.5 meters. It has a 3.2-meter corridor orientated to the west and is believed to have been built in the latter half of the 6th century. It is a rare example of a kofun in Nagoya that has an almost complete stone burial chamber. Grave goods such as earthenware, magatama, and iron weapons and implements and Sue an Haji ware pottery were recovered in the Taisho period, and more items were recovered in an excavation in 1961. Many of these items are stored at the Nagoya City Museum. Traces of a C-shaped moat with a width of 4.5 meters were discovered in 2006. At present, a lattice door is installed in front of the stone chamber and locked, so it is usually not possible to enter the inside.

== Gallery ==
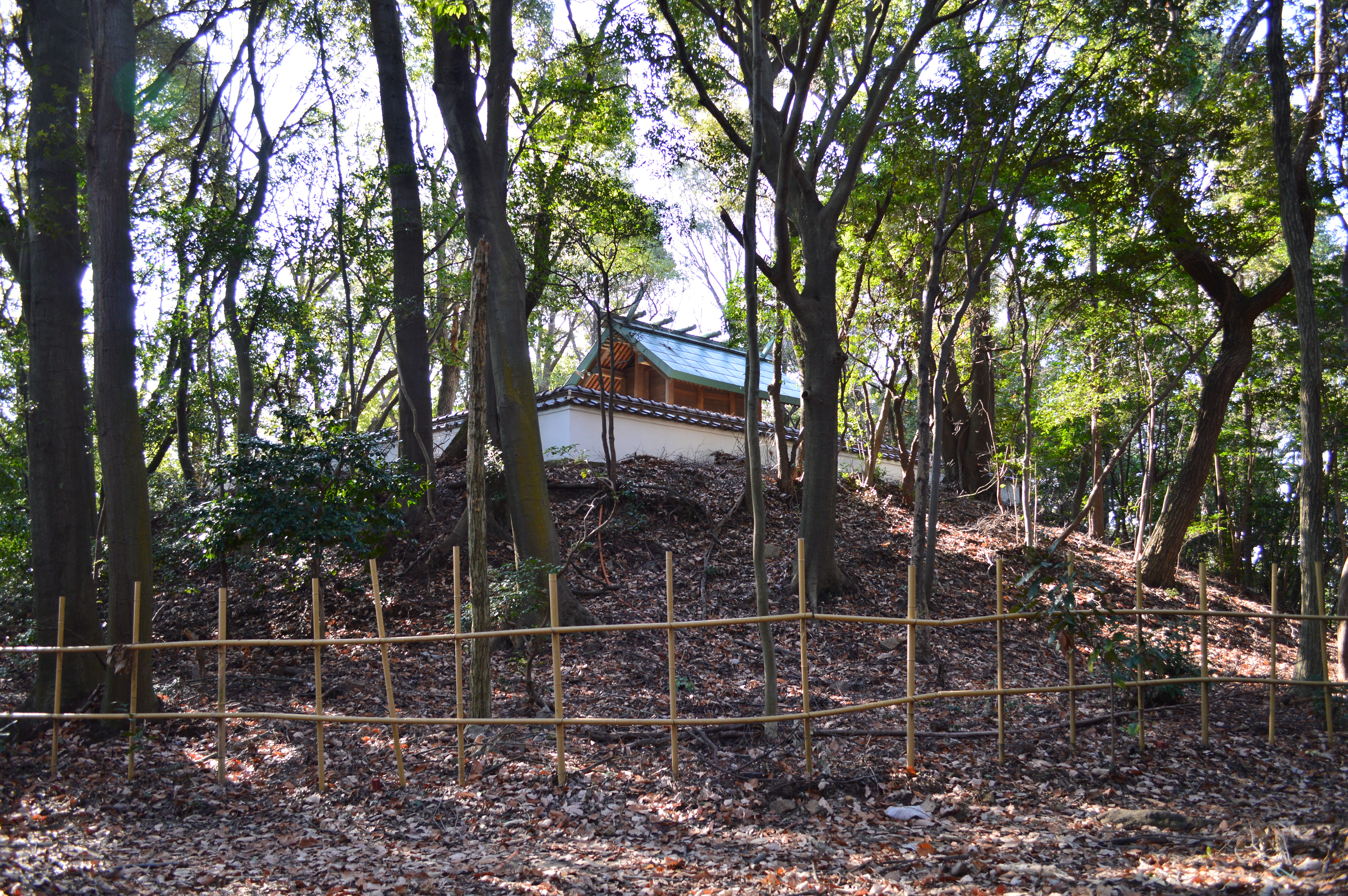
Owaribe Jinja Kofun

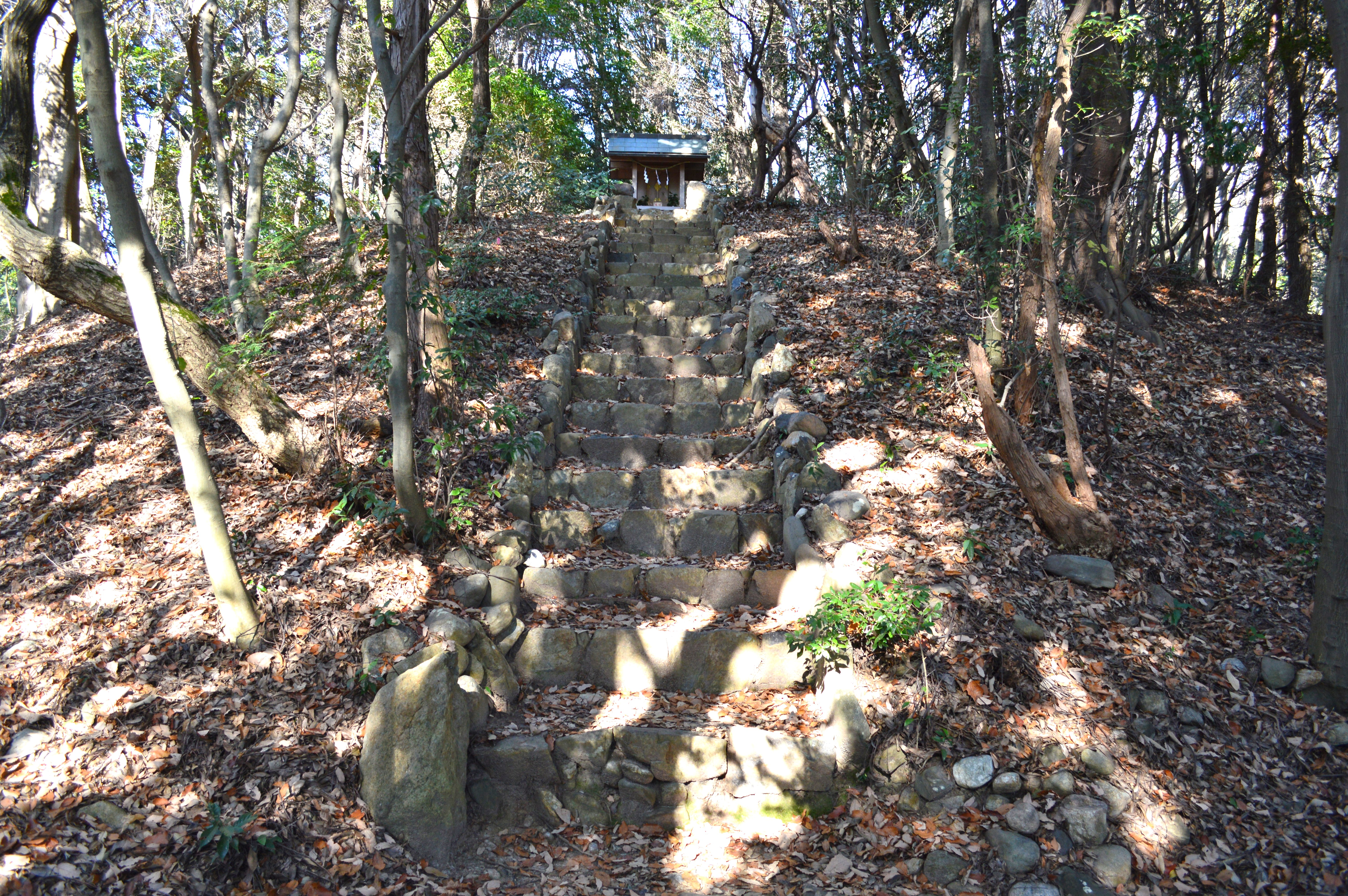
Naka-Yashiro Kofun

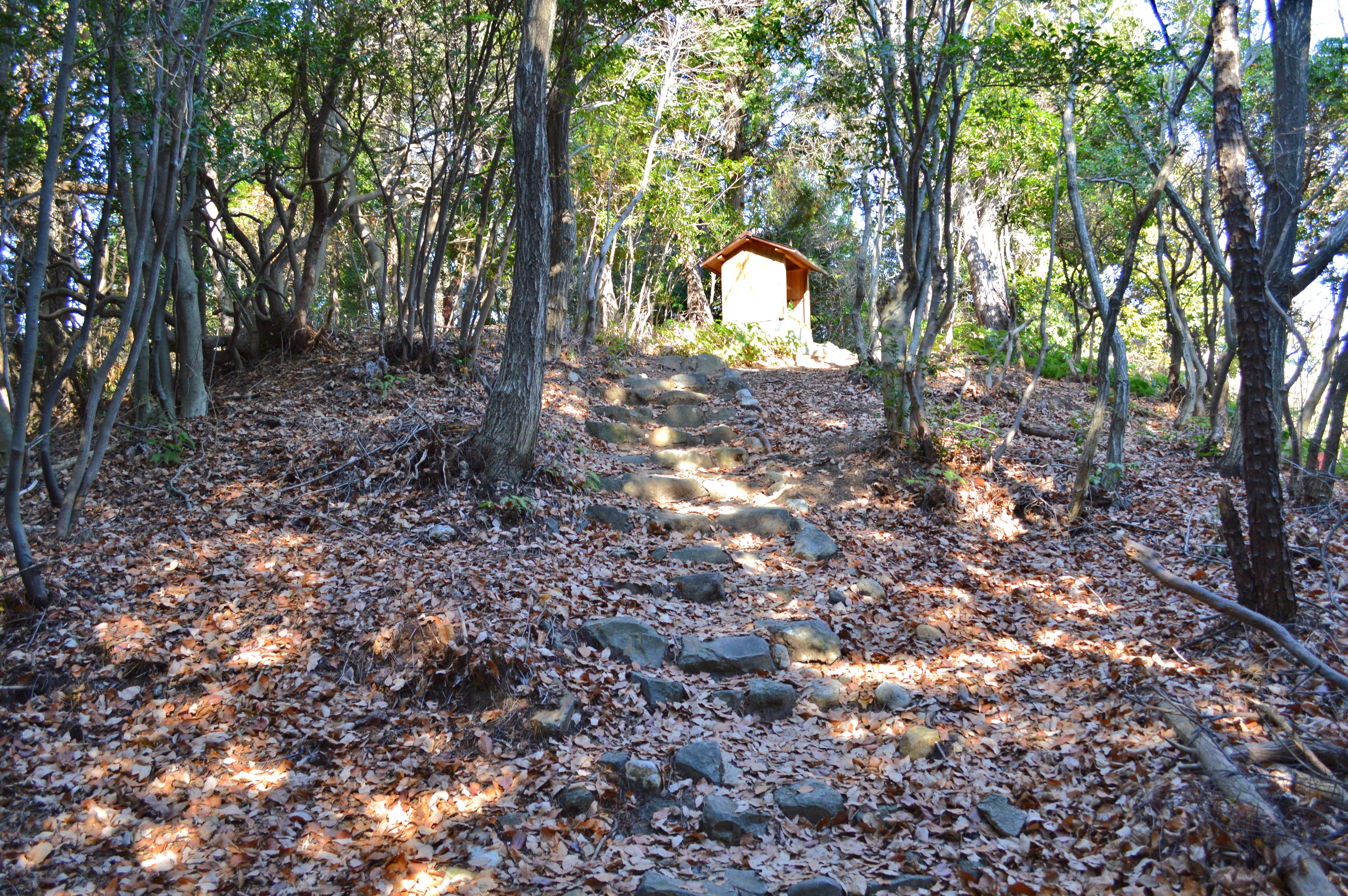
Minami-Yashiro Kofun

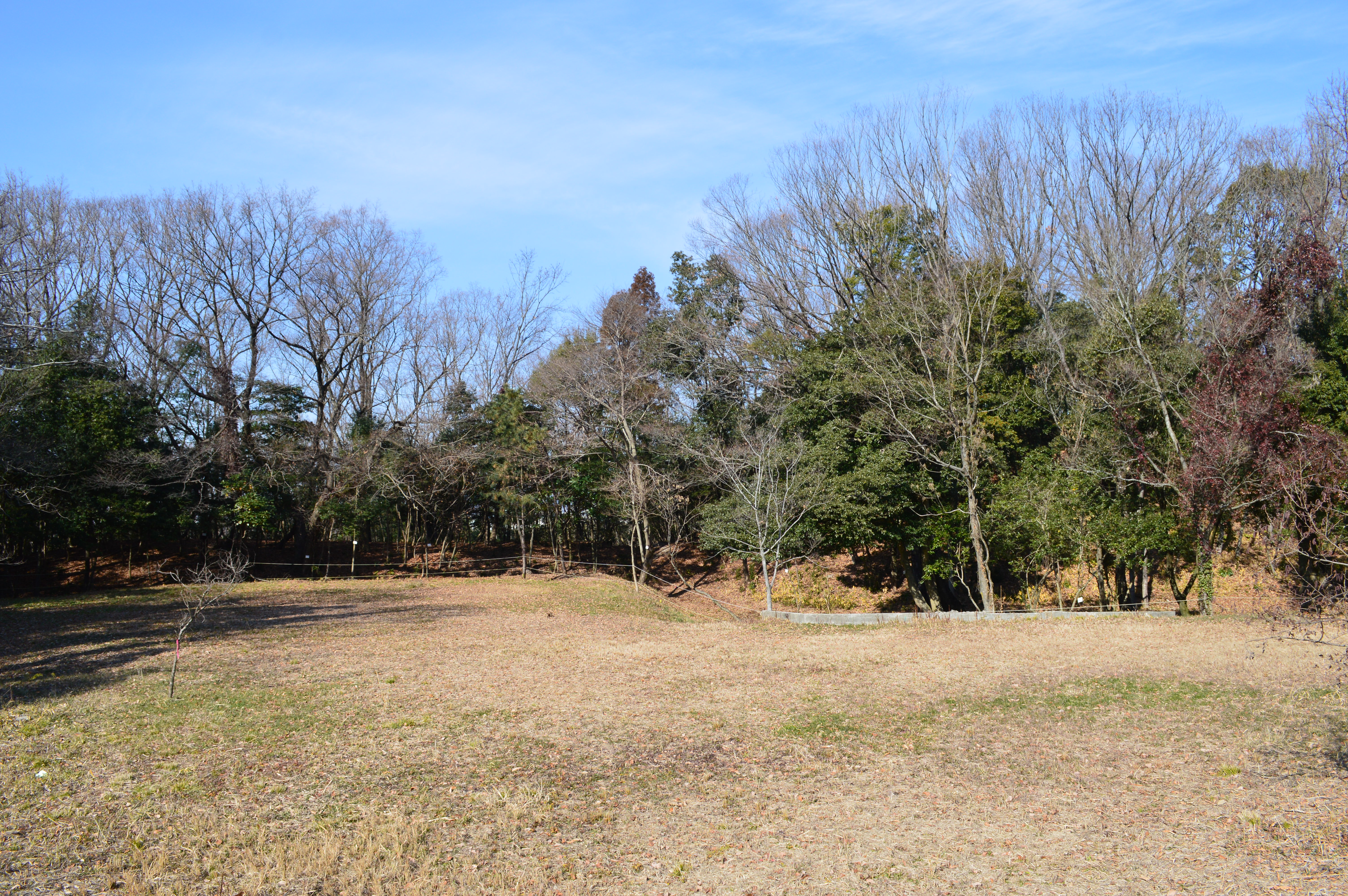
Shiratorizuka Kofun group

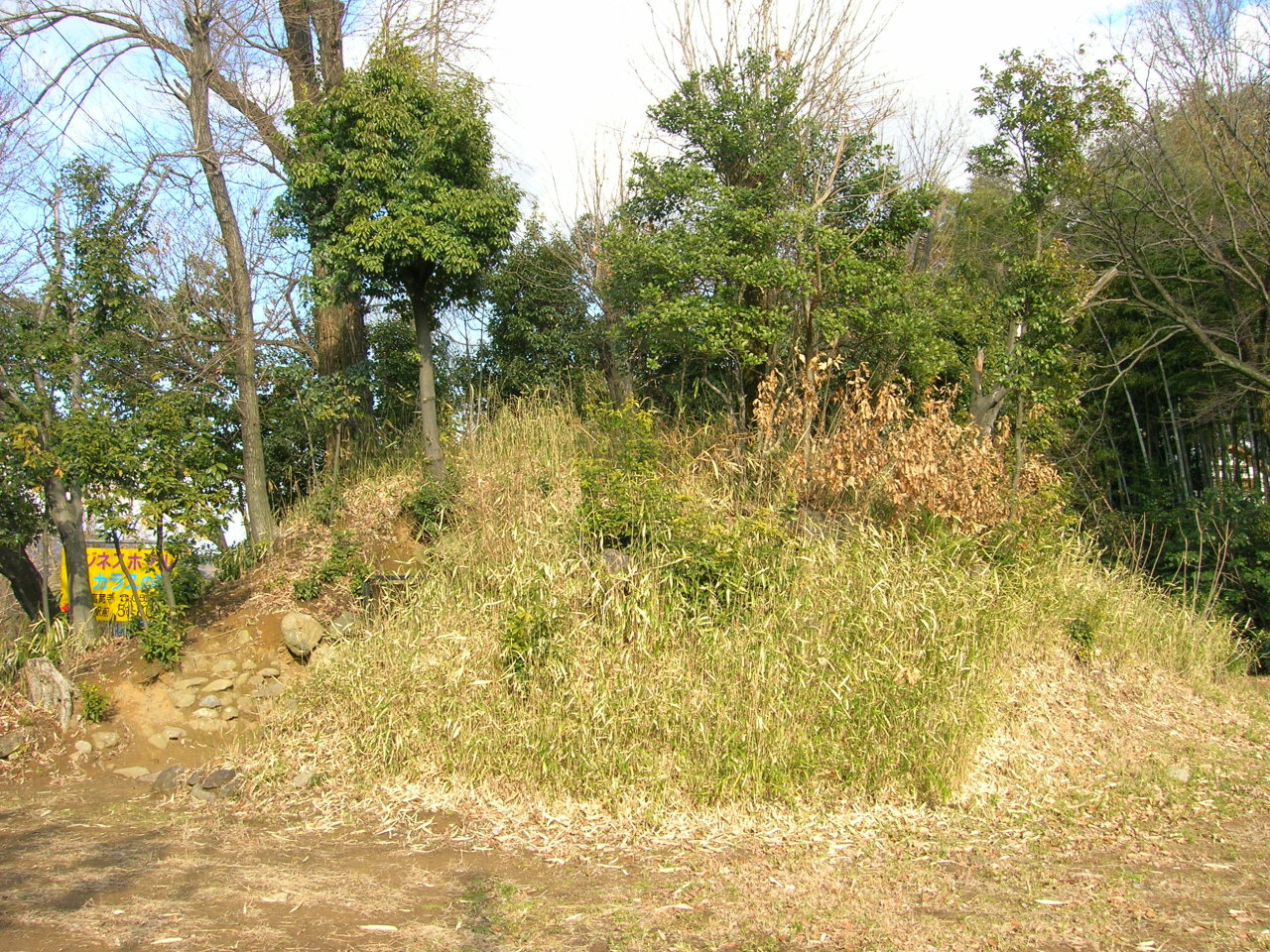
Shiratorizuka Kofun

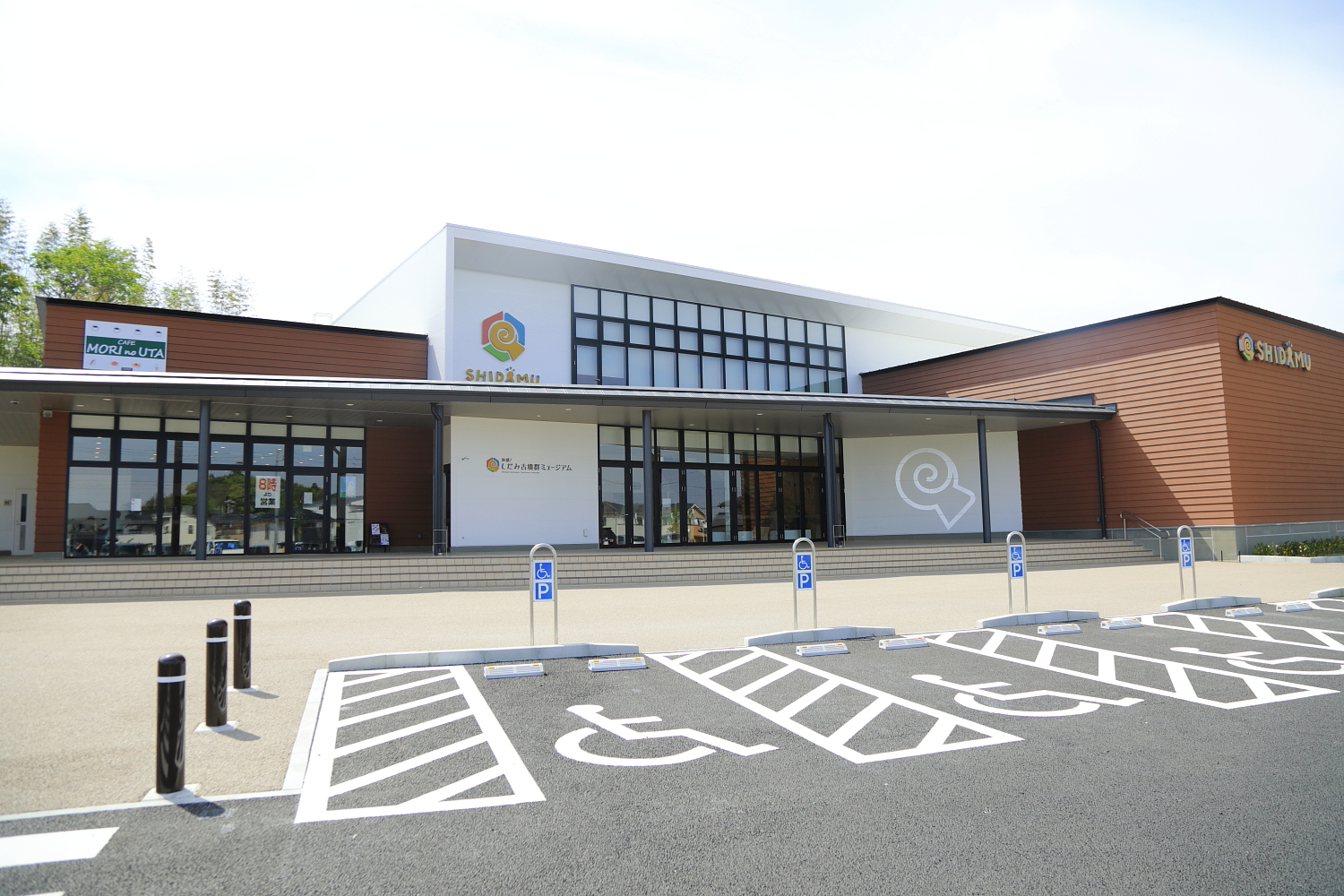
Experience! Shidami Kofungun Museum

== See also ==
- List of Historic Sites of Japan (Aichi)
