= List of town tramway systems in Japan =

This is a list of town tramway systems in Japan, past and present, by region. Regions and towns are arranged in geographic order, northeast to southwest.

== Legend ==
System Still Operating
System Closed

== Hokkaidō ==
Name of system	Location	Traction type	Gauge	Date (from)	Date (to)	Notes
Asahikawa Shigai Kidō (旭川市街軌道)	Asahikawa	Electric (600 V DC)	1,067 mm (3 ft 6 in)	3 November 1929	8 June 1956	
Asahikawa Denki Kidō (旭川電気軌道)	Asahikawa - Higashikawa (東川) and Asahiyama (旭山)	Electric (600 V DC)	1,067 mm (3 ft 6 in)	8 January 1927	31 December 1972	
Hakodate City Transportation Bureau	Hakodate	Horse	1,372 mm (4 ft 6 in)	12 December 1897	1913	
Hakodate City Transportation Bureau	Hakodate	Electric (600 V DC)	1,372 mm (4 ft 6 in)	31 October 1913		
Sapporo Streetcar	Sapporo	Horse	1,067 mm (3 ft 6 in)	1909	1918	
Sapporo Streetcar	Sapporo	Electric (600 V DC)	1,067 mm (3 ft 6 in)	4 August 1918		

== Tōhoku region ==
Name of system	Location	Traction type	Gauge	Date (from)	Date (to)	Notes
	Akayu	Human		3 May 1919	30 June 1924	Connected hot-spring resorts in Akayu village with Akayu railway station. Operation suspended because of depot (carbarn) fire. Restoration of service planned, not carried out. Electrification planned ca. 1926, not carried out.
Akita Basha Tetsudō (秋田馬車鉄道)	Akita to Tsuchizaki (土崎)	Horse	1,391 mm (4 ft 6.8 in)	14 July 1899	1922	
Akita City Transportation Bureau (秋田市電)	Akita to Tsuchizaki (土崎)	Electric (600 V DC)	1,067 mm (3 ft 6 in)	21 January 1922	30 March 1966	
Hanamaki Dentetsu (花巻電鉄)	Hanamaki - Nishi-Namari-onsen (西鉛温泉)	Electric (600 V DC)	762 mm (2 ft 6 in)	16 September 1915	31 August 1969	Horse traction used on some segments on temporary basis, 1920 - 1926. Connected Hanamaki town with Shidohira (志戸平), Ōzawa (大沢), and Namari (鉛) hot-spring resorts.
Matsuyama Jinsha Kidō (松山人車軌道)	Matsuyama	Human		22 November 1922	1 January 1930	Connected Matsuyama railway station with Chiishi (千石). Last jinsha (human-powered tramway) in Japan to carry passengers. Heritage jinsha tramway operates at Cosmos Garden, within Gohommaru Park, Matsuyama, with replica vehicle (built 1992).
Sendai City Transportation Bureau (仙台市電)	Sendai	Electric (600 V DC)	1,067 mm (3 ft 6 in)	25 November 1926	31 March 1976	
Akiu Denki Tetsudō (秋保電気鉄道)	Nagamachi (長町), Sendai - Akiu-onsen (秋保温泉)	Horse	762 mm (2 ft 6 in)	23 December 1914	1925	
Akiu Denki Tetsudō (秋保電気鉄道)	Nagamachi (長町), Sendai - Akiu-onsen (秋保温泉)	Electric (600 V DC)	1,067 mm (3 ft 6 in)	14 June 1925	8 May 1961	
Matsushima Densya (松島電車)	Matsushima	Electric (600 V DC)	1,067 mm (3 ft 6 in)	4 February 1922	by 1938 (or 22 January 1938)	Closed because construction of Sendai - Matsushima - Ishinomaki electric railway (opened in stages 1925 - 1928) ended the need for the tramway.

== Kantō region ==
Name of system	Location	Traction type	Gauge	Date (from)	Date (to)	Notes
Musashi Chūō Denki Tetsudō (武蔵中央電気鉄道)	Hachiōji	Electric (600 V DC)	1,067 mm (3 ft 6 in)	23 November 1929	30 June 1939	
Kawasaki City Transportation Bureau (川崎市電)	Kawasaki Station - Shiohama (塩浜)	Electric (600 V DC)	1,435 mm (4 ft 8 1/2 in)	13 October 1944	1969	Municipal town tramway.
Suihin Densha (水浜電車), later Ibaraki Kōtsū	Mito	Electric (600 V DC)	1,067 mm (3 ft 6 in)	28 December 1922	1 June 1966	Connected Mito, Ōarai and Minato.
Seisō Denki Kidō (成宗電気軌道)	Narita	Electric (600 V DC)	1,372 mm (4 ft 6 in)	11 December 1910	10 December 1944	
Tōbu Nikkō Tramway (日光電気軌道)	Nikkō	Electric (600 V DC)	1,067 mm (3 ft 6 in)	10 August 1910	24 February 1968	Connected Nikkō Station and Umagaeshi (馬返).
	Noda	Human		18 December 1900	13 October 1926	
Odawara Denki Tetsudō (小田原電気鉄道), later Hakone Tozan Railway	Odawara		1,372 mm (4 ft 6 in)	1 October 1888	1900	Operation suspended 21 December 1944 – 12 September 1946. Tramway extended between Kōzu Station, Odawara and Hakone-Yumoto as built. Odawara - Kōzu segment closed 6 December 1920. Replaced by railway line. Odawara - Hakone-Yumoto segment closed 31 May 1935. Replaced by railway line.
Odawara Denki Tetsudō (小田原電気鉄道), later Hakone Tozan Railway	Odawara	Electric (600 V DC)	1,435 mm (4 ft 8 1/2 in)	21 March 1900	31 May 1956	Operation suspended 21 December 1944 – 12 September 1946. Tramway extended between Kōzu Station, Odawara and Hakone-Yumoto as built. Odawara - Kōzu segment closed 6 December 1920. Replaced by railway line. Odawara - Hakone-Yumoto segment closed 31 May 1935. Replaced by railway line.
Kawagoe Denki Tetsudō (川越電気鉄道)	Ōmiya - Kawagoe	Electric (600 V DC)	1,372 mm (4 ft 6 in)	16 April 1906	?	Formally closed from 25 February 1941.
Utsunomiya Light Rail (宇都宮ライトレール）	Utsunomiya - Haga	Electric (750 V DC)	1,067 mm (3 ft 6 in)	26 August 2023		

=== Tokyo ===
Location	Name of system	Traction type	Gauge	Date (from)	Date (to)	Notes
Tokyo	Tokyo Toden (東京都電)	Horse	1,372 mm (4 ft 6 in)	25 June 1882	1903	Electric traction demonstrated at exhibition in Ueno Park, 3 May - 1 July 1890; introduction of electric traction to Japan. First electric tramway within Tokyo opened 22 August 1903. Last lines of historic “municipal” system closed 11 November 1972. The last remaining line (Toden Arakawa Line) is one of the company systems taken into municipal ownership from 1 February 1942. These served areas that were outside of the Tokyo municipal boundary until annexations in 1932.
Tokyo	Tokyo Toden (東京都電)	Electric	1,372 mm (4 ft 6 in)	22 August 1903		Electric traction demonstrated at exhibition in Ueno Park, 3 May - 1 July 1890; introduction of electric traction to Japan. First electric tramway within Tokyo opened 22 August 1903. Last lines of historic “municipal” system closed 11 November 1972. The last remaining line (Toden Arakawa Line) is one of the company systems taken into municipal ownership from 1 February 1942. These served areas that were outside of the Tokyo municipal boundary until annexations in 1932.
Jōtō Denki Kidō (城東電気軌道)		Electric (600 V DC)	1,372 mm (4 ft 6 in)	30 December 1917	?	Connected with municipal network from 7 May 1929.
Jōtō Denki Kidō (城東電気軌道)	Higashi - Arakawa (東荒川) - Imaibashi (今井橋)	Electric (600 V DC)	1,372 mm (4 ft 6 in)	31 December 1925	19 May 1952	Unconnected line of the Jōtō system, located east of the Arakawa drainage canal. Replaced by trolleybus.
	Suginami Line (杉並線)	Electric		26 August 1921	10 December 1963	
Tamagawa Denki Tetsudō (玉川電気鉄道)	Tamagawa Line (玉川線)	Electric (600 V DC)	1,372 mm (4 ft 6 in)	6 March 1907	11 May 1969	Built by predecessor of today's Tokyu Corporation. Not taken into municipal ownership (excepting short segments lying northeast of Shibuya.
Setagaya	Tōkyū Setagaya Line	Electric		18 January 1925		Surviving portion of Tōkyū Tamagawa Line.
Kanamachi (金町)		Human		7 December 1899	1912	Replaced by electric railway line.

Name of system	Location	Traction type	Gauge	Date (from)	Date (to)	Notes
Yokohama City Transportation Bureau (横浜市電)	Yokohama	Electric (600 V DC)	1,372 mm (4 ft 6 in)	15 July 1904	31 March 1972	

== Chūbu region ==
Name of system	Location	Traction type	Gauge	Date (from)	Date (to)	Notes
Meitetsu Gifu Lines (名鉄岐阜市内線)	Gifu	Electric	1,067 mm (3 ft 6 in)	11 February 1911	31 March 2005	
Meitetsu Okoshi-sen (名鉄起線)	Ichinomiya	Electric (600 V DC)	1,067 mm (3 ft 6 in)	1 February 1924	31 May 1954	Service suspended from 1 June 1953, and formally closed from 1 June 1954.
Kanazawa Denki Kidō (金沢電気軌道), later Hokuriku Tetsudō	Kanazawa	Electric (600 V DC)	1,067 mm (3 ft 6 in)	2 February 1919	10 February 1967	
Matsumoto Electric Railway	Matsumoto	Electric		19 April 1924	31 March 1964	
Nagoya City Tram (名古屋市電)	Nagoya	Electric	1,067 mm (3 ft 6 in)	6 May 1898	31 March 1972	
Meitetsu Okazaki Shinai-sen (名鉄岡崎市内線)	Okazaki	Horse	762 mm (2 ft 6 in)	1 January 1899	1912	Service suspended 19 June 1945 because of firebomb attack, restored 1946.
Meitetsu Okazaki Shinai-sen (名鉄岡崎市内線)	Okazaki	Electric (600 V DC)	1,067 mm (3 ft 6 in)	1 September 1912	17 June 1962	Service suspended 19 June 1945 because of firebomb attack, restored 1946.
Shizuoka Tetsudō Shimizu Shinai-sen (静岡鉄道清水市内線)	Shimizu	Steam		6 December 1913	17 July 1917	Services suspended from 7 July 1974.
Shizuoka Tetsudō Shimizu Shinai-sen (静岡鉄道清水市内線)	Shimizu	Electric		24 December 1928	20 March 1975	Services suspended from 7 July 1974.
Shizuoka Tetsudō Shizuoka Shinai-sen (静岡鉄道静岡市内線)	Shizuoka	Electric (600 V DC)	1,067 mm (3 ft 6 in)	2 August 1920	14 September 1962	
Manyō Line	Takaoka	Electric (600 V DC)	1,067 mm (3 ft 6 in)	10 April 1948		The current line incorporates segments opened from 12 October 1930 as part of Toyama - Shimminato railway.
Toyama Chiho Railway	Toyama	Electric		1 September 1913		Operation suspended 1 August 1945 because of firebomb attack. Service restored in stages from 14 January 1946.
Toyohashi Railroad City Line	Toyohashi	Electric		14 July 1925		

== Kansai region ==
Name of system	Location	Traction type	Gauge	Date (from)	Date (to)	Notes
Mie Kōtsu Shinto-Sen (三重交通神都線)	Ise	Electric		5 August 1903	19 January 1961	
Kobe Municipal Transportation Bureau (神戸市電)	Kobe	Electric (600 V DC)	1,435 mm (4 ft 8 1/2 in)	5 April 1910	13 March 1971	
Kuwana Denki (桑名電軌)	Kuwana	Electric (600 V DC)	1,067 mm (3 ft 6 in)	17 September 1927	9 January 1944	
Kyoto Municipal Transportation Bureau (京都市電)	Kyoto	Electric (600 V DC)	1,435 mm (4 ft 8 1/2 in) (line 10 Kitano tramway until 31 July 1961: 1,067 mm (3 ft 6 in).)	1 February 1895	30 September 1978	
Keifuku Electric Railroad	Kyoto - Arashiyama	Electric	1,435 mm (4 ft 8 1/2 in)	25 March 1910		
Keihan Keishin Line	Misasagi Station (Kyoto) - Hamaōtsu Station	Electric; 1,500 V DC (600 V DC until 1996)	1,435 mm (4 ft 8 1/2 in)	15 August 1912		Street track segment in Kyoto replaced by new underground alignment built as part of a metro project and opened 12 October 1997. Four-car metro trains operate on a short segment of street track in Ōtsu.
Osaka Municipal Transportation Bureau (大阪市電)	Osaka	Electric	1,435 mm (4 ft 8 1/2 in)	12 September 1903	31 March 1969	
Hankai Tramway	Osaka - Sakai	Horse		20 September 1900	31 January 1908	
Hankai Tramway	Osaka - Sakai	Electric (600 V DC)	1,435 mm (4 ft 8 1/2 in)	1 October 1910		
Nankai Railway (南海和歌山軌道線)	Wakayama	Electric (600 V DC)	1,067 mm (3 ft 6 in)	23 January 1909	31 March 1971	

== Chūgoku region ==
Name of system	Location	Traction type	Gauge	Date (from)	Date (to)	Notes
Hiroshima Electric Railway	Hiroshima	Electric	1,435 mm (4 ft 8 1/2 in)	23 November 1912		
Hiroshima Electric Railway Miyajima Line	Hiroshima - Miyajima	Electric		22 August 1922		Opened in stages, completed 1 February 1931. Built as a railway, through workings over town tramway system started 1 April 1958. Railway stock gradually replaced by tramway stock; last railway stock withdrawn 20 August 1994.
Iwakuni Denki Kidō (岩国電気軌道)	Iwakuni	Electric (600 V DC)	1,067 mm (3 ft 6 in)	2 February 1909	5 April 1929	
Kure City Transportation Bureau (呉市電)	Kure	Electric (600 V DC)	1,067 mm (3 ft 6 in)	31 October 1909	17 December 1967	
Okayama Electric Tramway	Okayama	Electric (600 V DC)	1,067 mm (3 ft 6 in)	5 May 1912		
Sanyō Denki Kidō (山陽電気軌道)	Shimonoseki	Electric (600 V DC)	1,067 mm (3 ft 6 in)	25 December 1926	6 February 1971	Town tramway system incorporated a short length of railway line opened 22 April 1914, electrified 9 April 1926.
Yonago Densha Kidō (米子電車軌道)	Yonago	Electric (600 V DC)	1,067 mm (3 ft 6 in)	1 April 1925	27 November 1938	

== Shikoku ==
Name of system	Location	Traction type	Gauge	Date (from)	Date (to)	Notes
Tosaden	Kōchi	Electric		2 May 1904		East-west tramway line extends between Ino, Kōchi and Gomen.
Matsuyama City Line	Matsuyama	Steam		22 August 1895	15 April 1927	
Matsuyama City Line	Matsuyama	Electric		8 August 1911		
Shikoku Suiryoku Denki (四国水力電気市内線), later Takamatsu-Kotohira Electric Railroad	Takamatsu	Electric (600 V DC)	1,435 mm (4 ft 8 1/2 in)	20 May 1917	3 July 1945	Closed because of firebomb attack which destroyed most of the town. Town tramway not rebuilt because extension of local electric railway lines to town center and railway station eliminated the need for the tramway. Officially closed from 8 January 1957.

== Kyūshū ==
Name of system	Location	Traction type	Gauge	Date (from)	Date (to)	Notes
Nishi-Nippon Railroad Fukuoka Shinai-sen (西鉄福岡市内線)	Fukuoka	Electric (600 V DC)	1,067 mm (3 ft 6 in) & 1,435 mm (4 ft 8 1/2 in)	9 March 1910	10 February 1979	1,067 mm (3 ft 6 in) and 1,435 mm (4 ft 8 1/2 in) gauge lines (included dual-gauge sections).
Kagoshima City Transportation Bureau	Kagoshima	1,435 mm (4 ft 8 1/2 in)		1 December 1912		
	Karatsu	Horse		11 June 1900	1930	
	Karatsu	Petrol (gasoline)		1913	28 November 1930	
Nishi-Nippon Railroad Kitakyūshū-sen (西鉄北九州線)	Kitakyūshū	Horse		11 June 1906	1920	
Nishi-Nippon Railroad Kitakyūshū-sen (西鉄北九州線)	Kitakyūshū	Electric		5 June 1911	25 November 2000	
Chikuho Electric Railroad Line	Kitakyūshū - Nōgata	Electric (600 V DC)	1,435 mm (4 ft 8 1/2 in)	21 March 1956		Express tramway line.
Kumamoto City Transportation Bureau	Kumamoto	Steam		24 July 1908	July 1920	
Kumamoto City Transportation Bureau	Kumamoto	Electric		1 August 1924		
	Kurume - Hita	Horse		25 October 1903	1905	
	Kurume - Hita	Petrol (gasoline)		1905	1929	
	Kurume - Hita	Steam		1918	1929	
	Kurume - Hita	Electric		1918	1929	On segments of line within Kurume. Final operating segments closed 25 March 1929.
Nagasaki Electric Tramway	Nagasaki	Electric		16 November 1915		Operation suspended from 9 August 1945 because of damage caused by atomic bomb attack. Service restored in stages from 25 November 1945.
Ōita Kōtsu Betsudai Line (大分交通別大線)	Ōita - Beppu	Electric (600 V DC)	1,067 mm (3 ft 6 in)	10 May 1900	4 April 1972	
Nishi-Nippon Railroad Ōmuta Shinai-sen (西鉄大牟田市内線)	Ōmuta	Electric (600 V DC)	1,435 mm (4 ft 8 1/2 in)	1 December 1927	5 January 1952	Service suspended from 6 January 1952, and formally closed from 15 March 1954.
Saga Denki Kidō (佐賀電気軌道)	Saga	Electric (600 V DC)	914 mm (3 ft)	10 April 1930	20 August 1937	
	Tsuyazaki	Horse		28 April 1908	13 April 1939	

== Okinawa Prefecture ==
Name of system	Location	Traction type	Gauge	Date (from)	Date (to)	Notes
Okinawa Denki Kidō (沖縄電気軌道)	Naha	Electric (500 V DC)	1,067 mm (3 ft 6 in)	3 May 1914	19 March 1933	Line officially closed from 12 August 1933.

== See also ==
- List of town tramway systems
- List of light-rail transit systems
- List of rapid transit systems
- List of trolleybus systems

== Other reference sources ==
- 和久田康雄 Wakuda, Yasuo. 1993. 私鉄史ハンドブック Shitetsu shi handbook (Private Railways of Japan, Their Networks and Fleets, 1882 to 1991). Tokyo: Denkisha-kenkyūkai.
