= Sunadabashi Station =

Metro and guided bus station in Nagoya, Japan

Coordinates: 35.1888°N 136.9539°E

M14 Sunadabashi Station 砂田橋駅
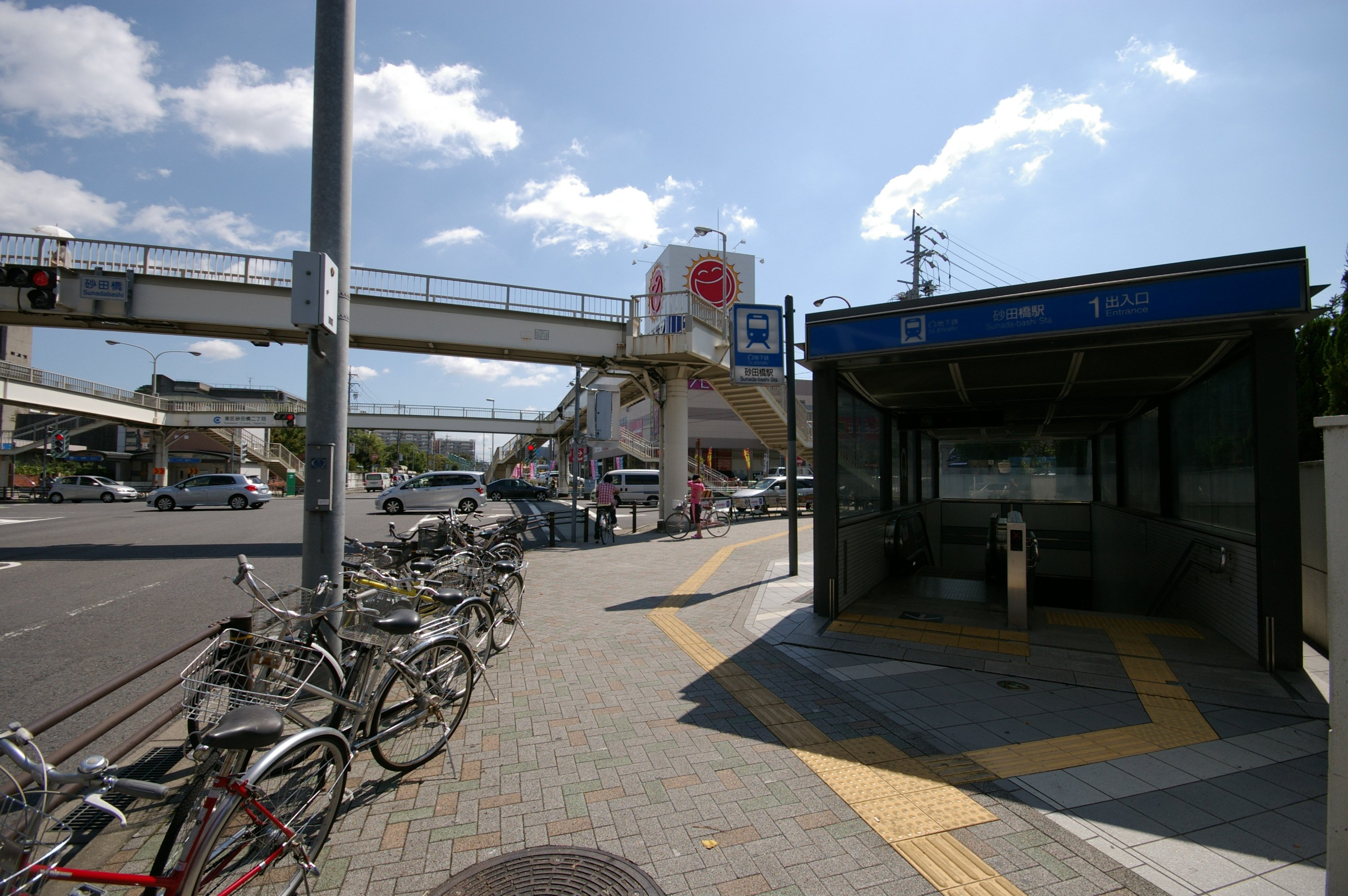
- Sunadabashi Subway Station entrance

General information
- Location: Higashi, Nagoya, Aichi （名古屋市東区大幸四丁目16） Japan
- System: Nagoya Municipal Subway station
- Operator: Transportation Bureau City of Nagoya
- Line: Meijō Line

Other information
- Station code: M14

History
- Opened: 2000; 26 years ago

Passengers
- 2008: 6,641 daily

Services
Preceding station	Nagoya Municipal Subway	Following station
Nagoya Dome-mae Yada M13 anticlockwise	Meijō Line	Chayagasaka M15 clockwise
Location

Sunadabashi Station 砂田橋駅

General information
- Location: Higashi, Nagoya, Aichi （名古屋市東区大幸南一丁目1） Japan
- System: Nagoya Guideway Bus station
- Line: Yutorito Line

Other information
- Station code: Y03

History
- Opened: 2001

Passengers
- 2008: 1,310 daily
Location

Sunadabashi Station (砂田橋駅, Sunadabashi-eki) is a railway station in Higashi-ku, Nagoya, Aichi Prefecture, Japan.

== Lines ==
- Nagoya Municipal Subway
  - Meijō Line (Station number: M14)
- Nagoya Guideway Bus
  - Yutorīto Line (Station number: Y03)

== Layout ==
=== Nagoya Municipal Subway ===
==== Platforms ====
1	■ Meijō Line	For Ōzone and Sakae
2	■ Meijō Line	For Motoyama and Yagoto

=== Nagoya Guideway Bus ===
==== Platforms ====
1	■ Yutorīto Line	For Obata Ryokuchi
2	■ Yutorīto Line	For Ōzone

== Adjacent stations ==
«	Service	»
Nagoya Guideway Bus
Yutorīto Line
Nagoya Dome-mae Yada	-	Moriyama
