= Kurumamichi Station =

Subway station in Nagoya, Japan

Coordinates: 35.1733°N 136.9297°E

S07 Kurumamichi Station 車道駅
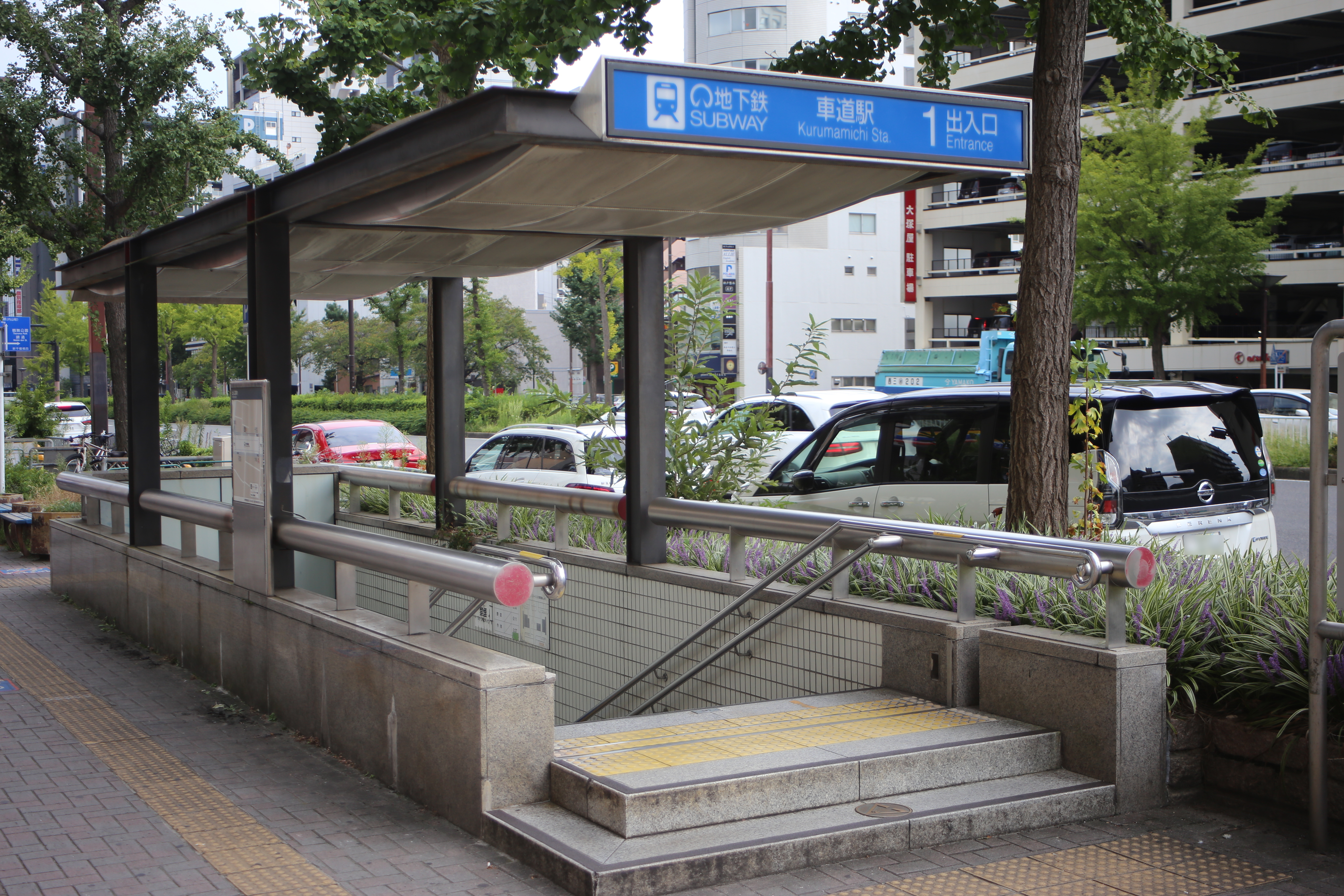

General information
- Location: Aoi 3-12, Higashi, Nagoya, Aichi （名古屋市東区葵三丁目12） Japan
- System: Nagoya Municipal Subway station
- Operator: Transportation Bureau City of Nagoya
- Line: Sakura-dōri Line
- Connections: Bus stop

Other information
- Station code: S07

History
- Opened: 10 September 1989; 37 years ago

Passengers
- 2007: 6,859 daily

Services
Preceding station	Nagoya Municipal Subway	Following station
Takaoka S06 towards Taiko-dori	Sakura-dōri Line	Imaike S08 towards Tokushige
Location

Kurumamichi Station (車道駅, Kurumamichi-eki) is a subway station on the Nagoya Municipal Subway in Higashi-ku, Nagoya, Aichi Prefecture, Japan

It was opened on 10 September 1989 (37 years ago).

== Lines ==
- Nagoya Municipal Subway
  - Sakura-dōri Line (Station number: S07)

== Layout ==
=== Platforms ===
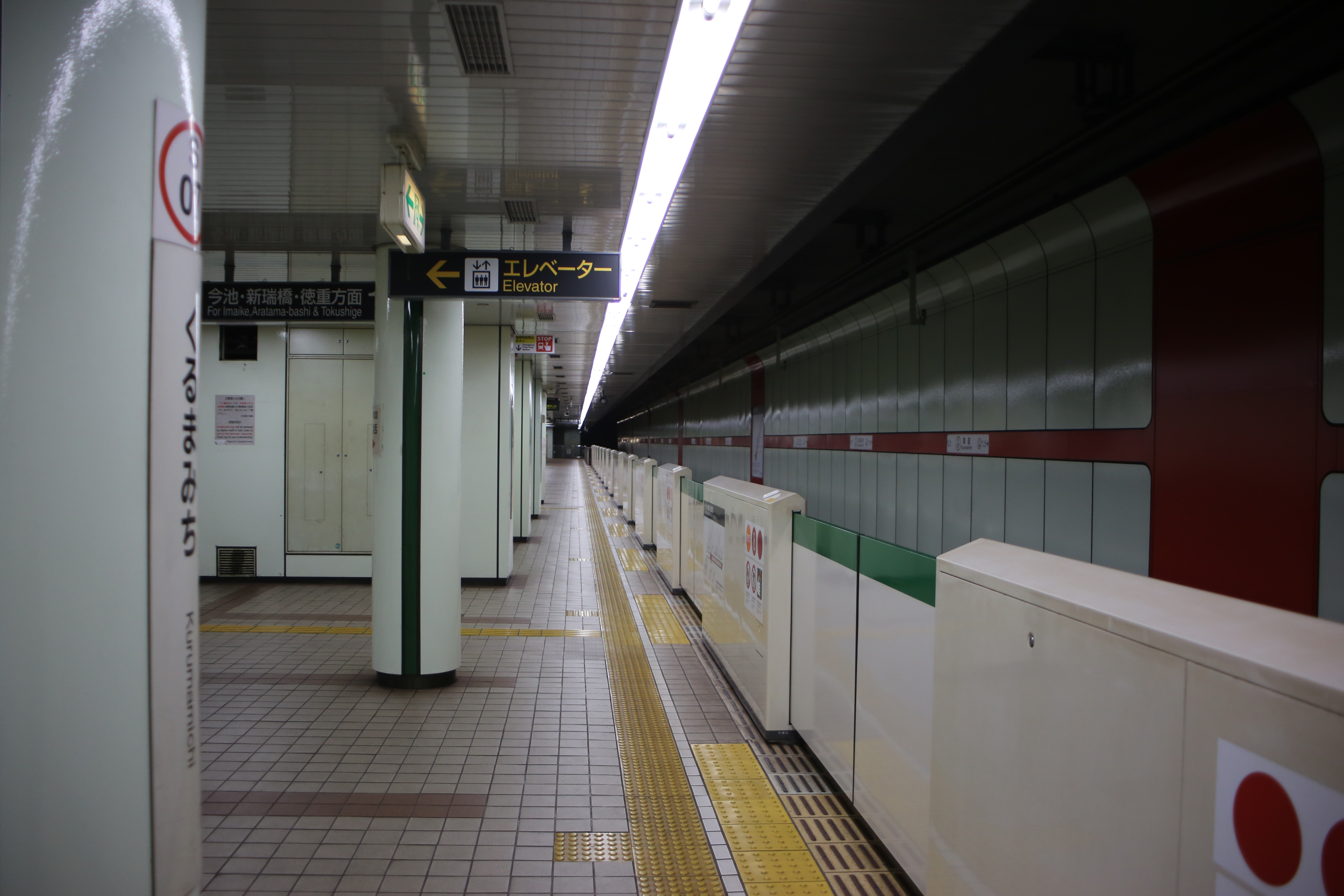
Kurumamichi Station platforms, September 2021

1	■ Sakura-dōri Line	For Imaike, Aratama-bashi and Tokushige
2	■ Sakura-dōri Line	For Nagoya and Taiko-dori
