= Nagoya Dome-mae Yada Station =

Metro and guided bus station in Nagoya, Japan

M13 Nagoya Dome-mae Yada Station ナゴヤドーム前矢田駅
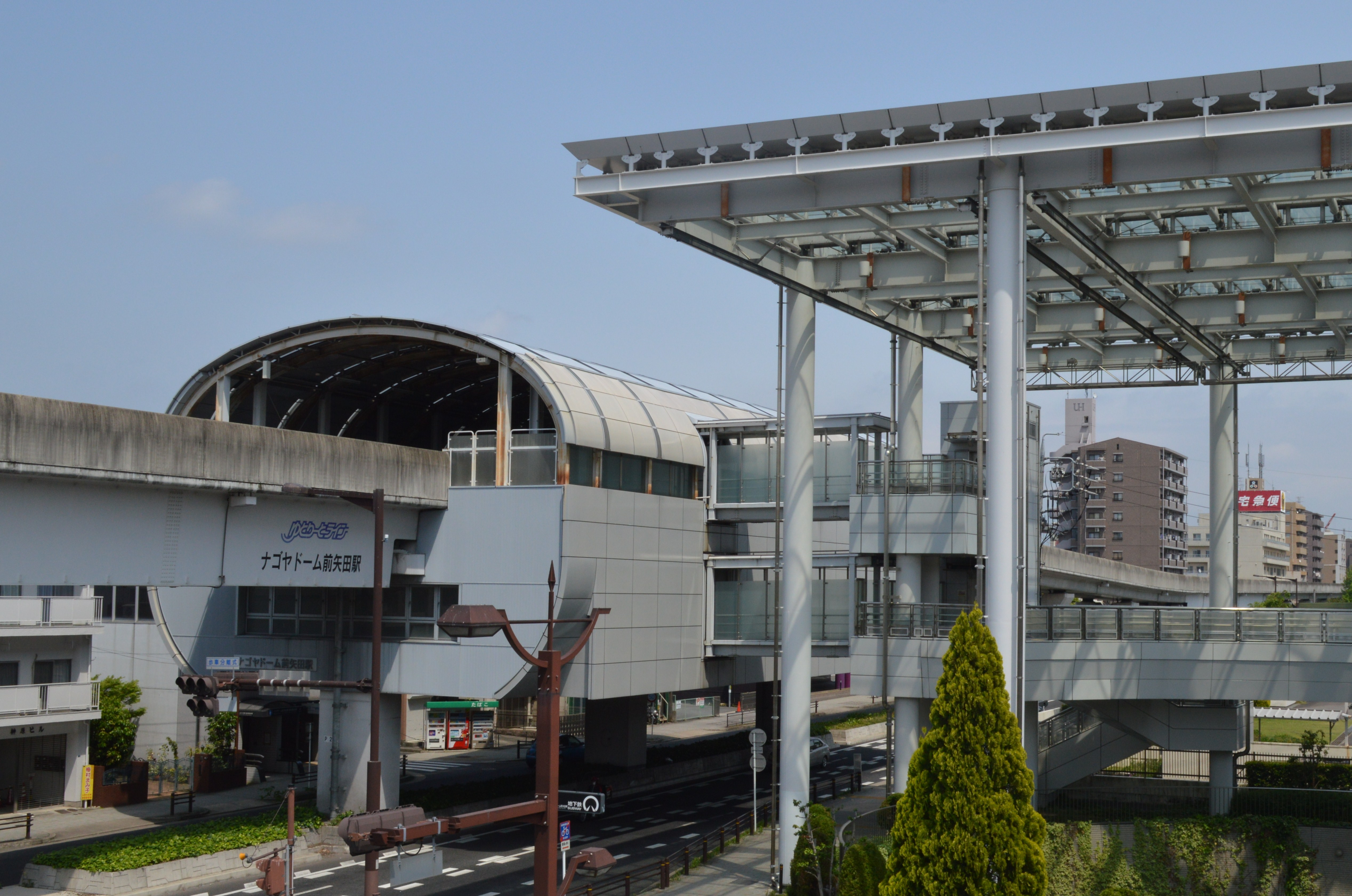

General information
- Location: Higashi, Nagoya, Aichi; Japan
- Coordinates: 35°11′25″N 136°56′50″E
- System: Nagoya Municipal Subway station
- Operator: Transportation Bureau City of Nagoya; Nagoya Guideway Bus
- Lines: Meijō Line; Yutorito Line
- Connections: Bus terminal

Other information
- Station code: M13; Y02

History
- Opened: 2000

Services
Preceding station	Nagoya Municipal Subway	Following station
Ōzone M12 anticlockwise	Meijō Line	Sunadabashi M14 clockwise
Location

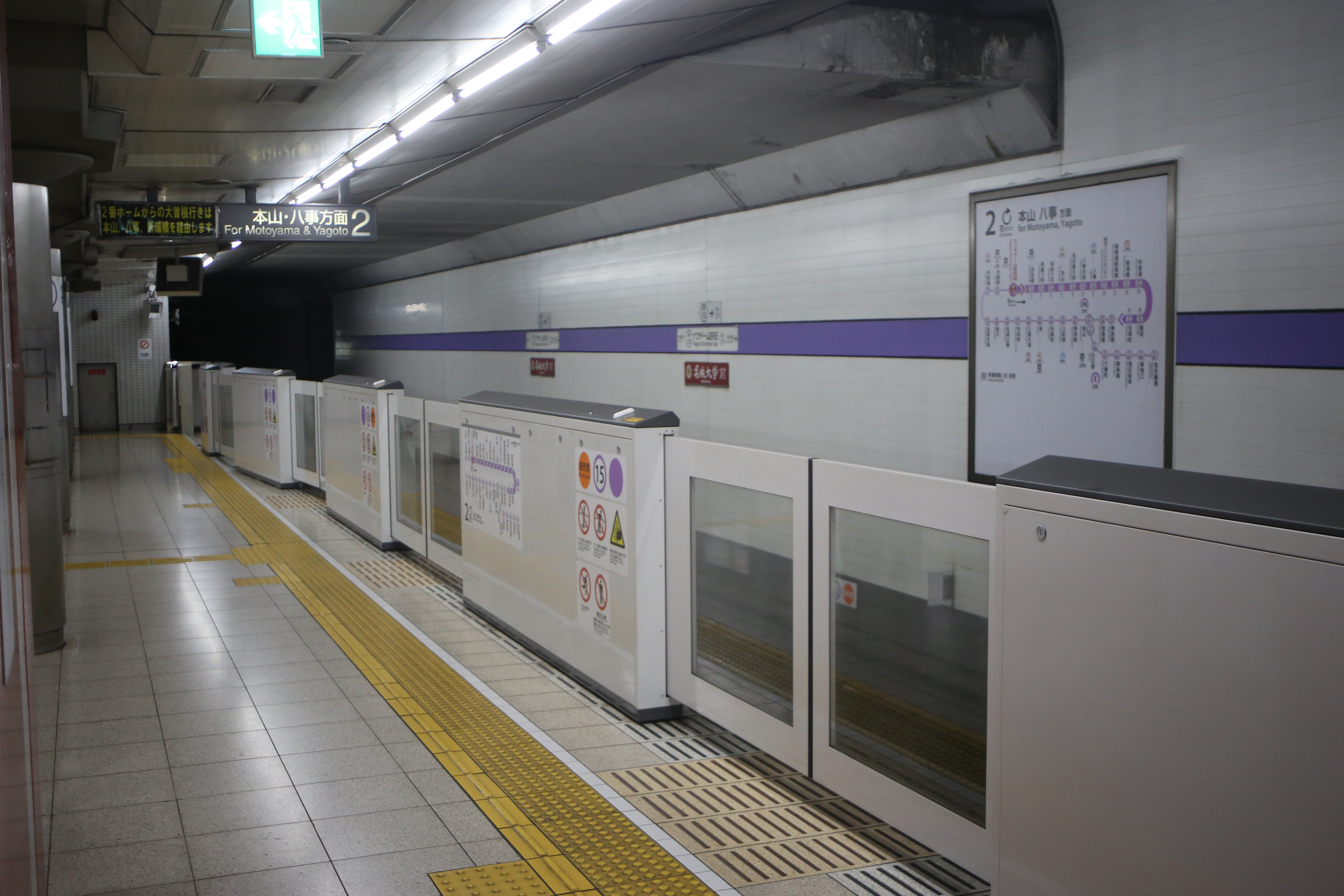
Meijō Line platform

Nagoya Dome-mae Yada Station (ナゴヤドーム前矢田駅, Nagoya Dome-mae Yada-eki) is a railway station in Higashi-ku, Nagoya, Aichi Prefecture, Japan.

It provides access to Nagoya Dome, where baseball games and various other large public events are held in Nagoya.

== Lines ==
- Nagoya Municipal Subway
  - Meijō Line (Station number: M13)
- Nagoya Guideway Bus
  - Yutorīto Line (Station number: Y02)

== Layout ==
=== Nagoya Municipal Subway ===
==== Platforms ====
1	■ Meijō Line	For Sakae and Kanayama
2	■ Meijō Line	For Motoyama and Yagoto

=== Nagoya Guideway Bus ===
==== Platforms ====
1	■ Yutorīto Line	For Obata Ryokuchi
2	■ Yutorīto Line	For Ōzone

== Adjacent stations ==
«	Service	»
Nagoya Guideway Bus
Yutorīto Line
Ōzone	-	Sunadabashi
