= Nagoya Future Culture College =

Coordinates: 35°10′17.1″N 136°55′14.1″E

Nagoya Future Culture College (名古屋文化短期大学, Nagoya bunka tanki daigaku) is a private junior college in Higashi-ku, Nagoya, Aichi Prefecture, Japan, established in 1950.
