= Higashi-ku, Nagoya =

Higashi 東区
- Ward
- Higashi Ward
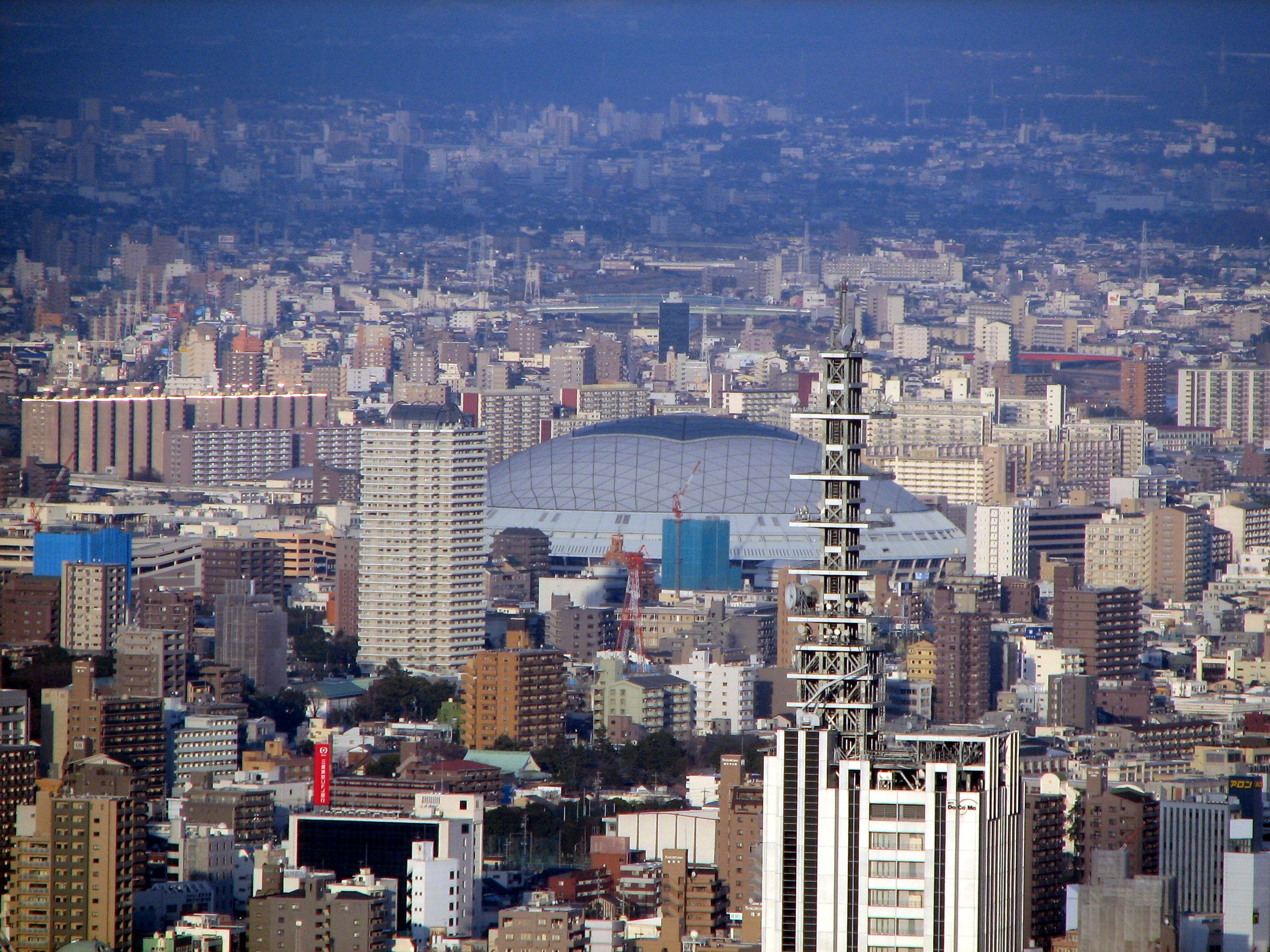
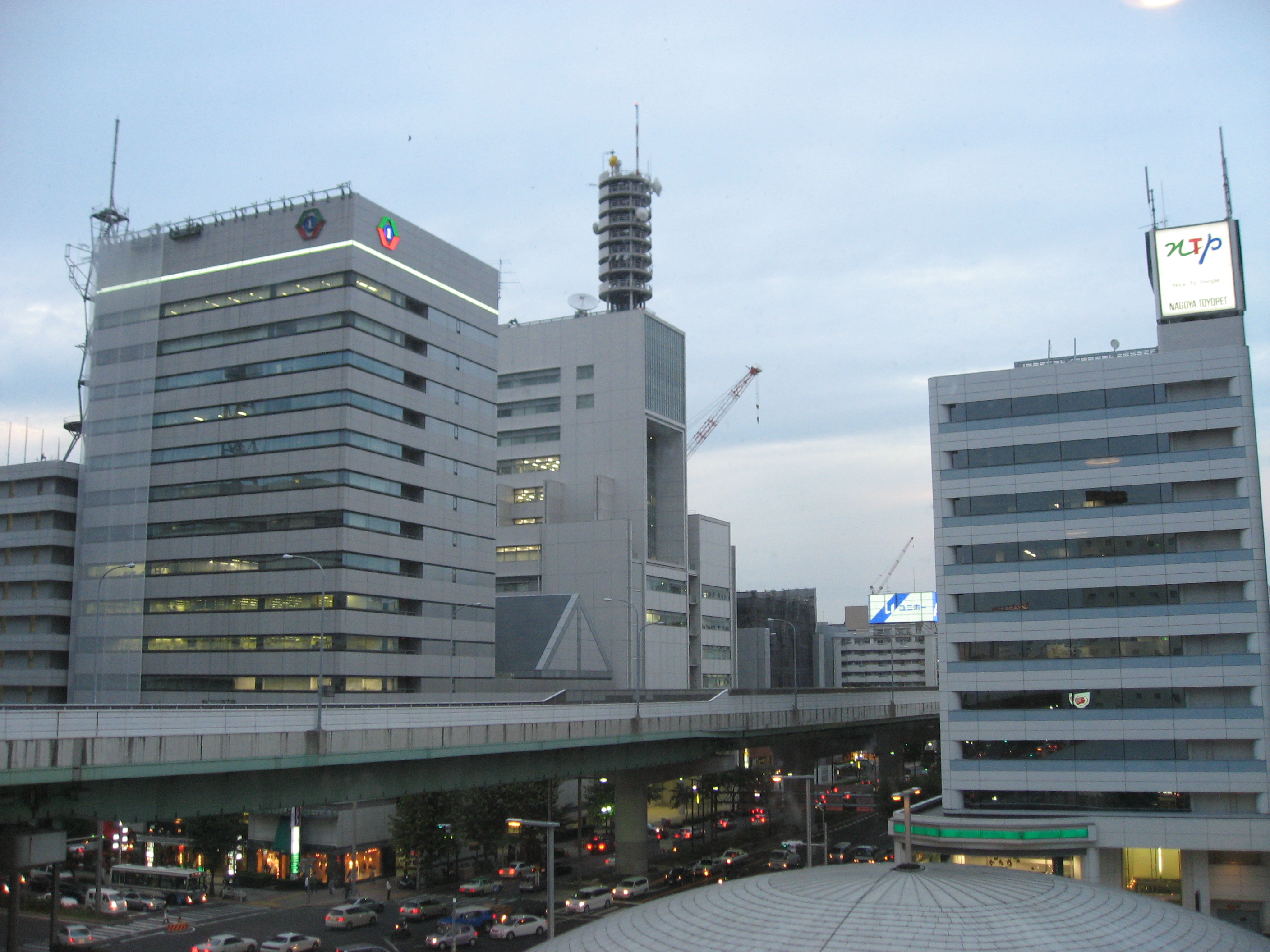
- Nagoya Dome from Midland Square; Higashizakura night view

- Location of Higashi-ku in Nagoya

- Coordinates: 35°10′46″N 136°55′34″E
- Country: Japan
- Region: Tōkai region Chūbu region
- Prefecture: Aichi

Area
  - Total: 7.71 km^{2} (2.98 sq mi)

Population (October 1, 2019)
  - Total: 82,939
  - Density: 10,800/km^{2} (27,900/sq mi)
- Time zone: UTC+9 (Japan Standard Time)
- Tree: Magnolia liliiflora
- Flower: Tree peony
- Phone number: 052-935-2271
- Address: 1-7-74 Tsutsui, Higashi-ku, Nagoya-shi, Aichi-ken 464-8644
- Website: www.city.nagoya.jp/higashi/ (in Japanese)

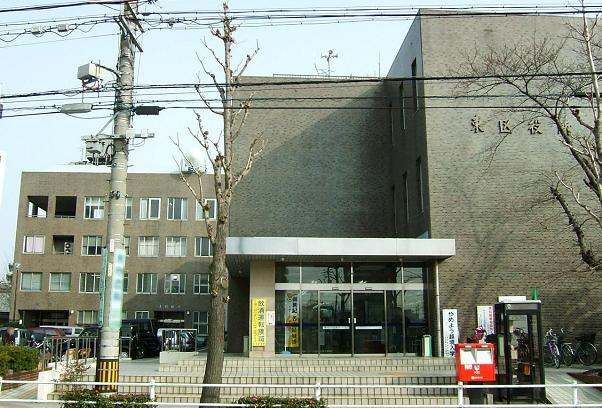
Higashi-ku Ward Office

Higashi Ward (東区, Higashi-ku) is one of the 16 wards of the city of Nagoya in Aichi Prefecture, Japan. As of 1 October 2011, the ward had an estimated population of 82,939 and a population density of 10,757 persons per km^{2}. The total area was 7.71 km^{2}.

== Geography ==
Higashi Ward is located in the center of Nagoya city. It is the smallest of the wards of Nagoya in terms of geographic area.

=== Surrounding municipalities ===
- Chikusa Ward
- Kita Ward
- Moriyama Ward
- Naka Ward

== History ==
Higashi Ward was one of the original four wards of the city of Nagoya, established on April 1, 1908. Most of the area was completely destroyed during the Bombing of Nagoya in World War II. After the war, the layout of the streets was changed to a grid pattern, with wide streets serving as firebreaks.

== Economy ==
Higashi Ward has the headquarters of Tōkai Television Broadcasting as well as the NHK Nagoya Broadcasting Station.

== Education ==
- Aichi University - Kurumamichi campus
- Nagoya University – Medical School
- Nagoya Future Culture College

== Transportation ==
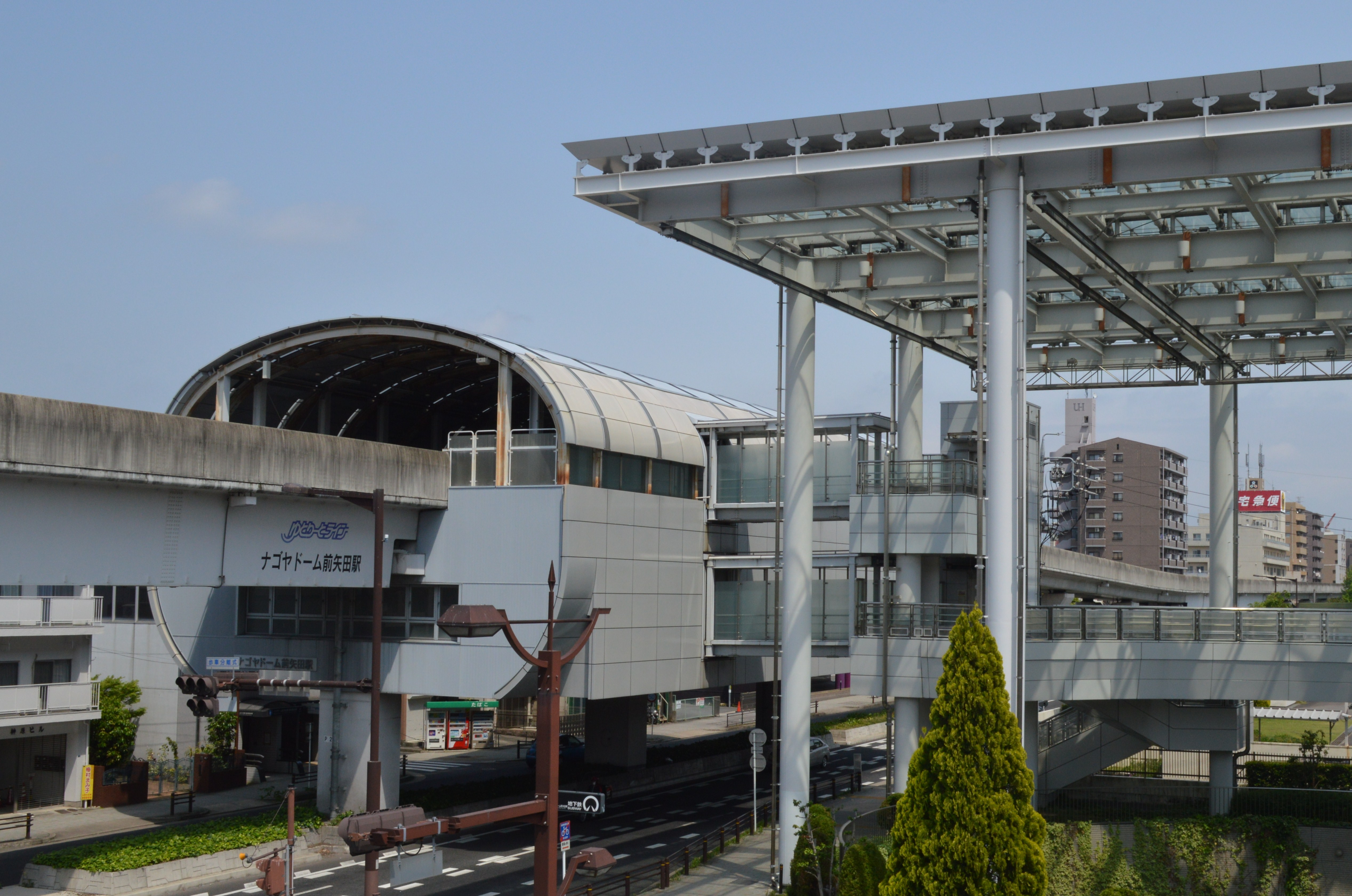
Nagoya Dome-mae Yada Station

=== Rail ===
- JR Central - Chūō Main Line
  - Ōzone
- Meitetsu – Seto Line
  - Morishita - Ōzone - Yada
- Nagoya Municipal Subway – Higashiyama Line
  - Shinsakae-machi - Chikusa
- Nagoya Municipal Subway – Sakura-dōri Line
  - Takaoka -Kurumamichi
- Nagoya Municipal Subway – Meijō Line
  - Nagoya Dome-mae Yada – Sunadabashi
- Nagoya Guideway Bus – Yutorito Line
  - Ōzone – Nagoya Dome-mae Yada – Sunadabashi

=== Highways ===
- Ring Route (Nagoya Expressway)
- Route 1 (Nagoya Expressway)
- National Route 19
- National Route 41

== Local attractions ==
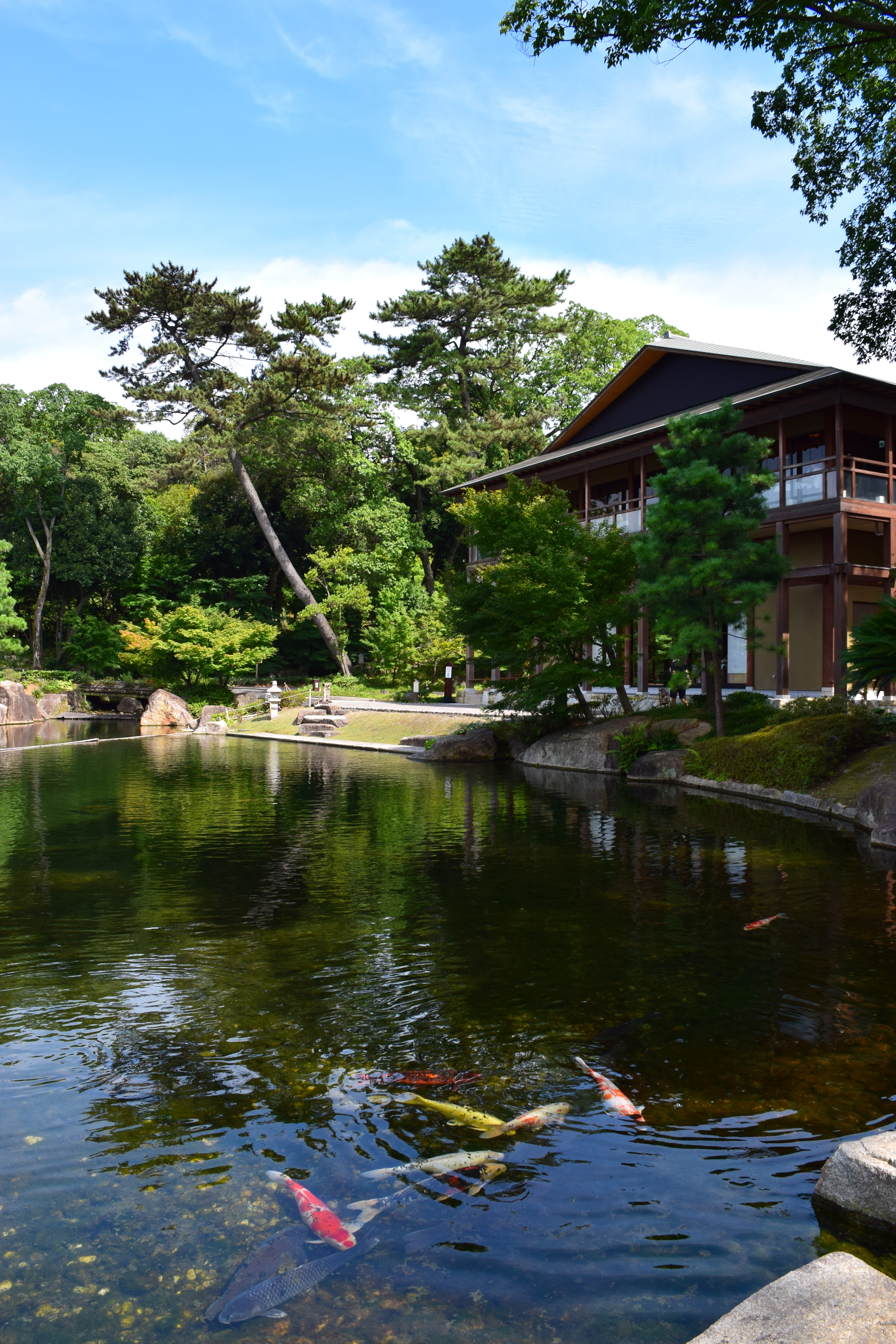
Tokugawa Garden of the Ōzone Oshitayashiki

- Aichi Arts Center
- Oasis 21
- Ōzone Oshitayashiki with Tokugawa Garden and Tokugawa Art Museum
- Aoi Oshitayashiki, former Tokugawa residence
- Nagoya Dome
- Cultural Path
  - Cultural Path Futaba Museum
- Hori Art Museum
- Morimura Museum of Yamatoe Art
- Nagoya City Performing Arts Center
- Catholic Chikaramachi Church
- Bank of Tokyo-Mitsubishi UFJ Money Museum
- Nagoya Ceramics Hall
- Yamazaki Mazak Museum of Art
- ÆON MALL NAGOYADOMEMAE

== Notable people from Higashi-ku, Nagoya ==
- Keiko Takeshita – actress
