= Takaoka Station (Nagoya) =

Metro station in Nagoya, Japan

Coordinates: 35.1740°N 136.9154°E

S06 K04 Takaoka Station 高岳駅
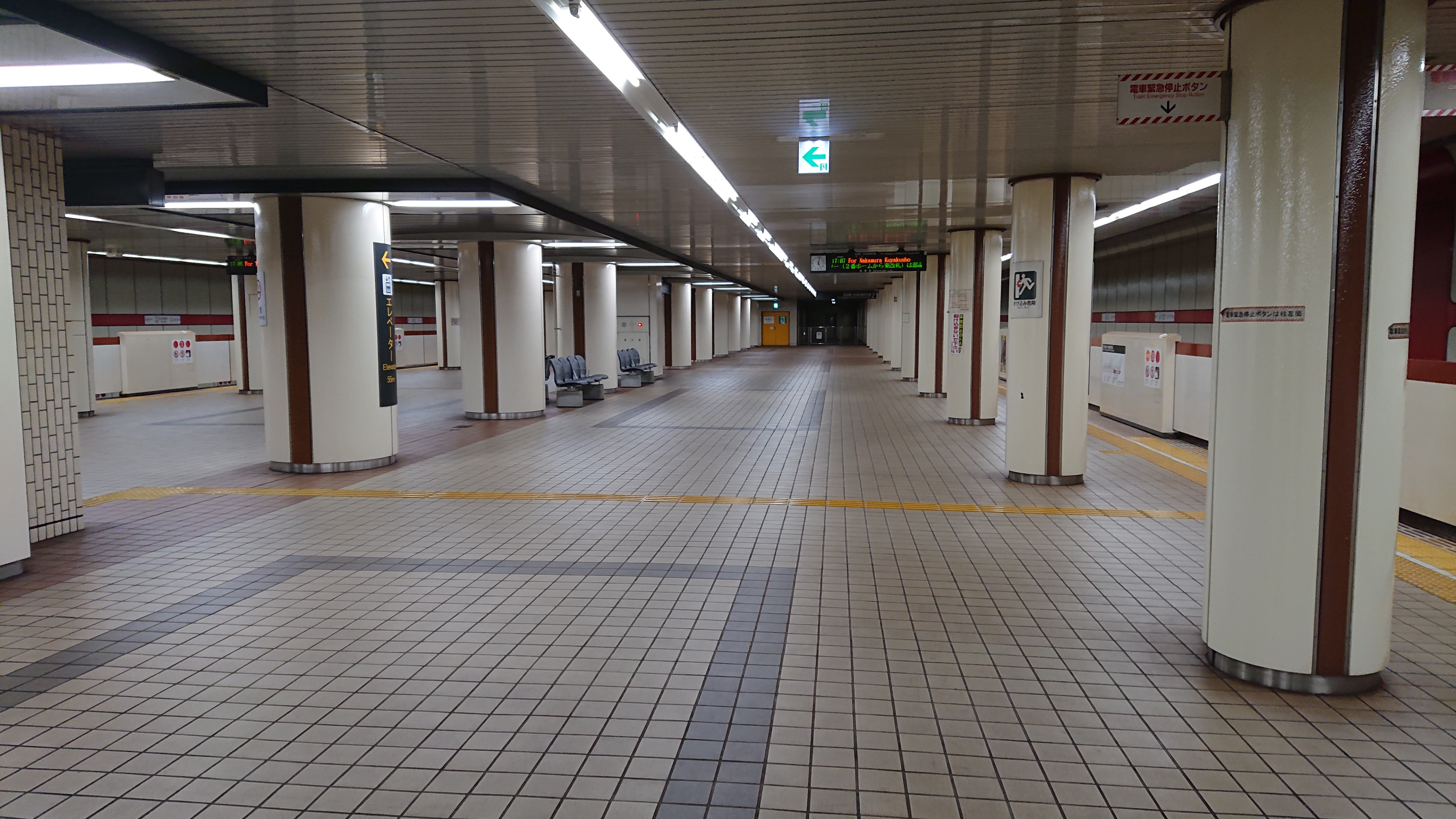

General information
- Location: 2-1-2 Higashisakura, Higashi-ku, Nagoya, Aichi （名古屋市東区東桜二丁目1-2） Japan
- System: Nagoya Municipal Subway station
- Operator: Transportation Bureau City of Nagoya
- Lines: Sakura-dōri Line; Kamiiida Line (planned)
- Connections: Bus stop

Other information
- Station code: S06

History
- Opened: 10 September 1989; 37 years ago

Passengers
- FY2007: 6,380 daily

Services
Preceding station	Nagoya Municipal Subway	Following station
Hisaya-ōdōri S05 towards Taiko-dori	Sakura-dōri Line	Kurumamichi S07 towards Tokushige
Location

Takaoka Station (高岳駅, Takaoka-eki) is a railway station in Higashi-ku, Nagoya, Aichi Prefecture, Japan, operated by the Transportation Bureau City of Nagoya.

This station provides access to Tōkai Television Broadcasting and Nagoya Performing Arts Center.

== Lines ==
- Nagoya Municipal Subway
  - Sakura-dōri Line (Station number: S06)

== Station layout ==
=== Platforms ===
1	■ Sakura-dōri Line	for Imaike, Aratama-bashi and Tokushige
2	■ Sakura-dōri Line	for Nagoya and Taiko-dori

== History ==
The station opened on 10 September 1989.
