= Shin-Moriyama Station =

Railway station in Nagoya, Japan

CF05 Shin-Moriyama Station 新守山駅
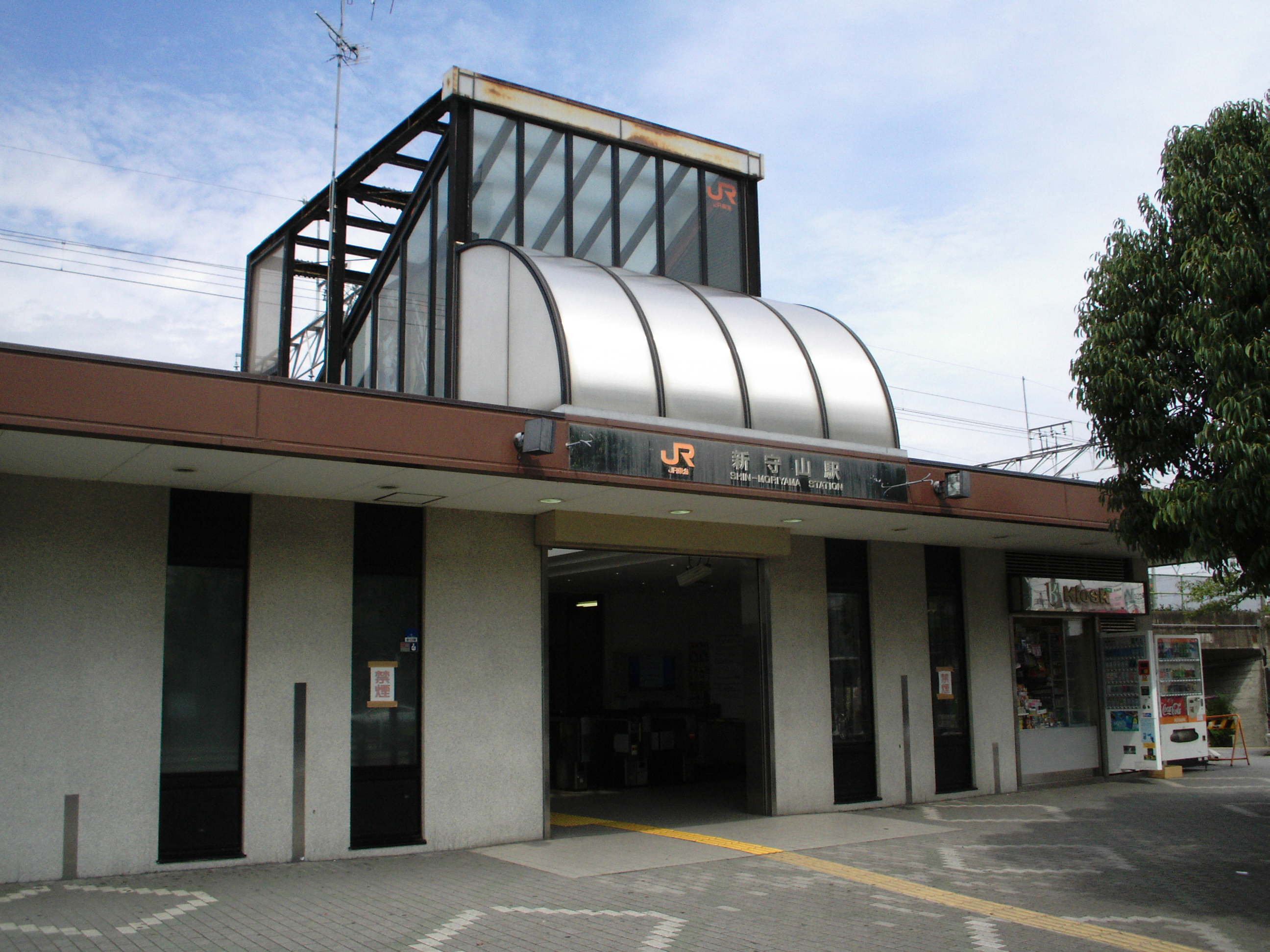
- Shin-Moriyama Station Station in September 2007

General information
- Location: 268 Shinmorichō, Moriyama-ku, Nagoya-shi, Aichi-ken 463-0071; Japan
- Coordinates: 35.2066°N 136.9502°E
- Operator: JR Central; JR Freight
- Line: Chūō Main Line
- Distance: 384.6 kilometers from Tokyo
- Platforms: 2 side platforms

Other information
- Status: Staffed
- Station code: CF05
- Website: Official website

History
- Opened: 1 January 1924; 102 years ago

Passengers
- FY2017: 8179 daily
Location
- Location within Aichi Prefecture Location within Japan

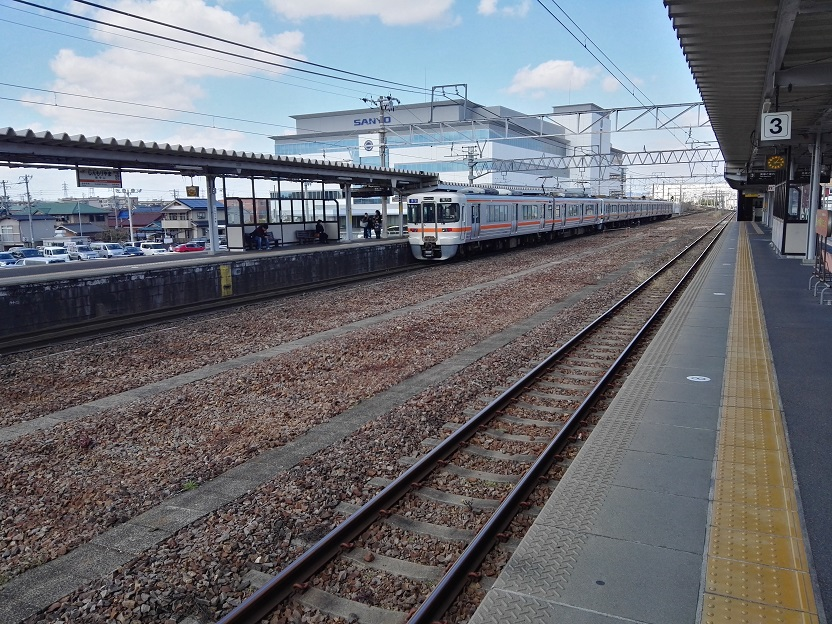
Platform

Shin-Moriyama Station (新守山駅, Shin-Moriyama-eki) is a railway station in Moriyama-ku, Nagoya, Aichi Prefecture, Japan, operated by Central Japan Railway Company (JR Tōkai). It is also freight depot for the Japan Freight Railway Company.

== Lines ==
Shin-Moriyama Station is served by the Chūō Main Line, and is located 384.6 kilometers from the starting point of the line at Tokyo Station and 12.3 kilometers from Nagoya Station.

== Station layout ==
The station has two elevated island platforms with the station building below.The station building has automated ticket machines, TOICA automated turnstiles and is staffed.

=== Platforms ===
1, 2	■ Chūō Main Line	For Tajimi, Nakatsugawa
3, 4	■ Chūō Main Line	For Nagoya

== Adjacent stations ==
«	Service	»
JR Central
Chūō Main Line
Home Liner: Does not stop at this station
Central Liner: Does not stop at this station
Rapid: Does not stop at this station
Kachigawa	Local	Ōzone

== Station history ==
Shin-Moriyama Station was opened on April 1, 1964. Along with the division and privatization of JNR on April 1, 1987, the station came under the control and operation of the Central Japan Railway Company.

== Passenger statistics ==
In fiscal 2017, the station was used by an average of 8179 passengers daily (arriving passengers only).

== Surrounding area ==
- Moriyama Nishi Junior High School
- Nijo Elementary School
- Japan National Route 19

== See also ==
- List of railway stations in Japan
