= Aichi Prefectural College of Nursing & Health =

Public university in Nagoya, Aichi, Japan

Coordinates: 35°17′00.44″N 136°55′44.97″E

- 愛知県立看護大学
- Type: Public
- Active: 1995–2009
- Location: Moriyama-ku, Nagoya, Japan
- Campus: Urban
- Website: www.nrs.aichi-pu.ac.jp/index-e.htm

Aichi Prefectural College of Nursing & Health (愛知県立看護大学, Aichi kenritsu kango daigaku) is a public university in Nagoya, Aichi, Japan. The school was established in 1995.

== See also ==
- Aichi Prefectural University
