= Moriyama-ku =

Ward of Nagoya in Chūbu, Japan

Moriyama 守山区
- Ward
- Moriyama Ward
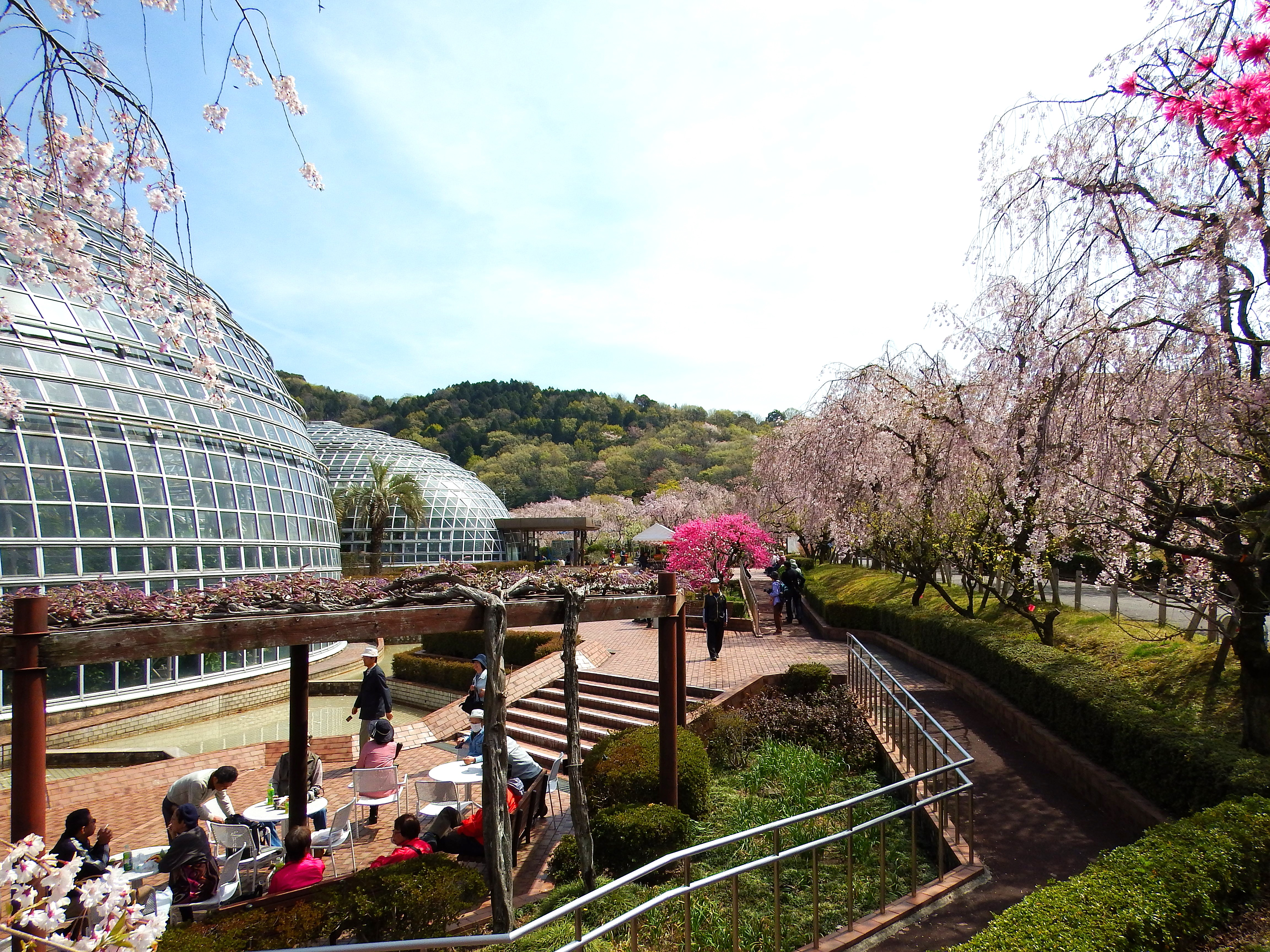
- Tōgokusan Fruits Park

- Location of Moriyama-ku in Nagoya

- Coordinates: 35°12′12″N 137°58′36″E
- Country: Japan
- Region: Chūbu, Tōkai
- Prefecture: Aichi
- City: Nagoya

Area
  - Total: 34.01 km^{2} (13.13 sq mi)

Population (October 1, 2019)
  - Total: 176,298
  - Density: 5,184/km^{2} (13,430/sq mi)
- Time zone: UTC+9 (Japan Standard Time)
- Tree: Oak
- Flower: Balloon flower
- Phone number: 052-793-3434
- Address: 1-3-1 Obata, Moriyama-ku, Nagoya 463-8510
- Website: www.city.nagoya.jp/moriyama/

Moriyama (守山区, Moriyama-ku) is one of the wards of the city of Nagoya in Aichi Prefecture, Japan. As of 1 October 2019, the ward has an estimated population of 176,298 and a population density of 5,184 inhabitants per square kilometre (13,430/sq mi). The total area is 34.01 km^{2} (13.13 sq mi).

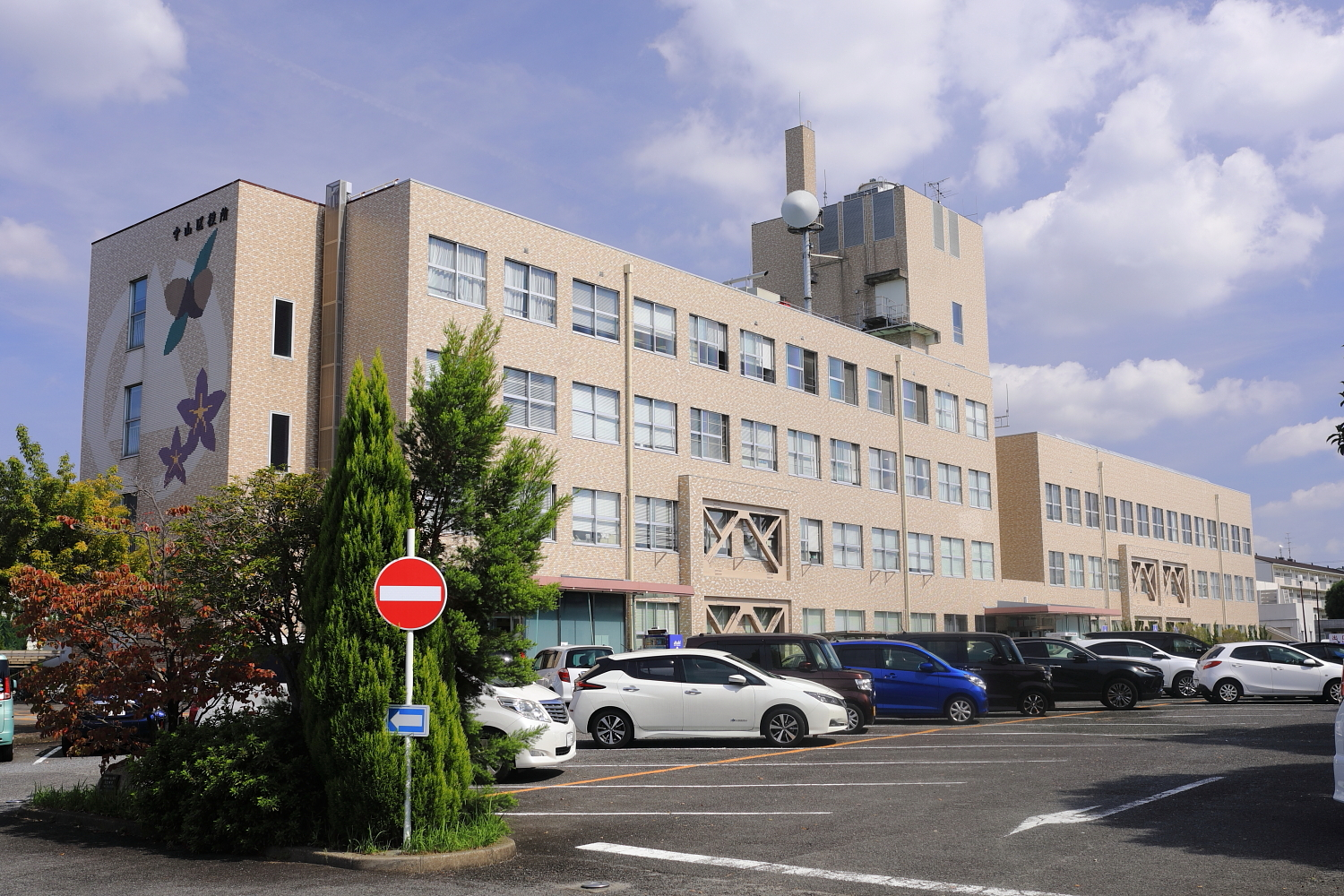
Moriyama-ku Ward Office

== Geography ==
Moriyama-ku is located in northeastern Nagoya. The Aichi Prefectural Forest Park covers much of its area.

=== Surrounding municipalities ===
- Kita-ku, Nagoya
- Higashi-ku, Nagoya
- Meito-ku, Nagoya
- Chikusa-ku, Nagoya
- Moriyama-ku, Nagoya
- Owariasahi
- Nagakute
- Seto
- Kasugai

== History ==
The area around present-day Moriyama-ku has been settled since the Japanese Paleolithic period, and was a coastal area during the Holocene glacial retreat. The remains of numerous kofun burial mounds have been discovered. By the Sengoku period, it was a contested border area of Owari province and the site of the Battle of Komaki and Nagakute.

In 1889, during the Meiji period, the area was organized into villages under Higashikasugai District, Aichi. In 1897, the area became home to the Imperial Japanese Army’s IJA 33rd Infantry Brigade under the command of the IJA 3rd Army headquartered in Nagoya. The region began to grow in population with the completion of the Japanese Government Railway’s line in 1900, and the Seto Electric Railway in 1905. Moriyama town was created on July 16, 1906, through the merger of four villages, and was raised to city status on June 1, 1954. On February 15, 1963 the city was annexed by Nagoya metropolis, becoming Moriyama-ku.

== Transportation ==
=== Railways ===
- Central Japan Railway Company – Chūō Main Line
  - Shin-Moriyama
- Meitetsu – Seto Line
  - Moriyama-Jieitai-Mae -Hyōtan-yama -Obata -Kitayama -Ōmori-Kinjōgakuin-mae
- Nagoya Guideway Bus – Yutorito Line
  - Moriyama – Moriyama Shiminbyōin – Kawamiya – Kawamura – Shirasawa Keikoku – Obata Ryokuchi

=== Highways ===
- Tōmei Expressway
- Japan National Route 19
- Japan National Route 302
- Japan National Route 155
- Japan National Route 363

== Education ==
- Nagoya International School
- Kinjo Gakuin University
- Aichi Prefectural College of Nursing & Health

== Landmarks ==
- Shidami Kofun group
- Tensokokyo headquarters

== Notable people from Moriyama-ku, Nagoya ==
- Naomi Kawashima – actress
