= Tōbu Nikkō Tramway =

Former tramway in Japan

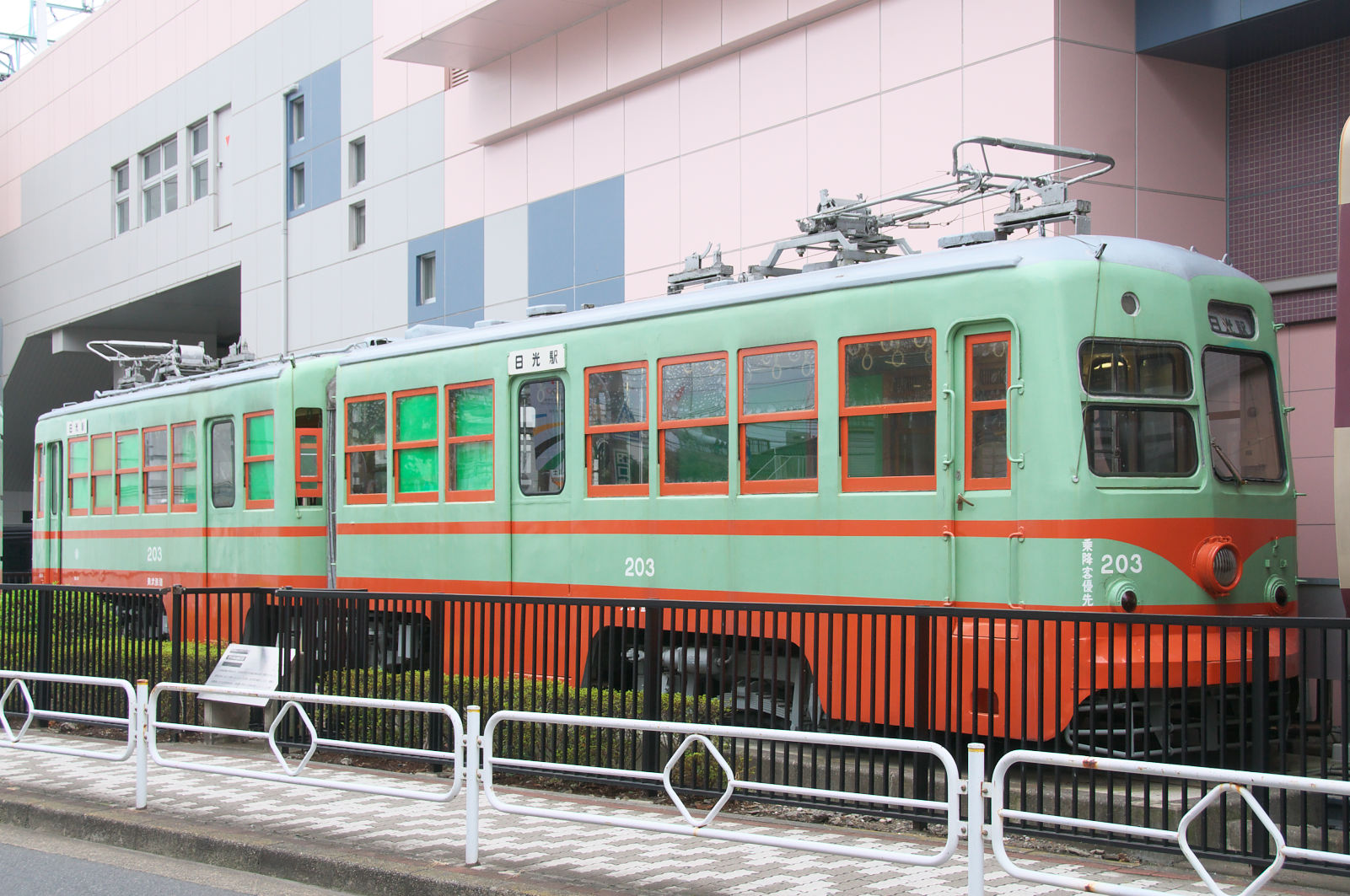
- Preserved 200 series tramcar formerly used on Nikkō Tramway

Overview
- Owner: Tobu Railway
- Locale: Tochigi Prefecture
- Termini: Kokutetsu Ekimae; Umagaeshi
- Stations: 20

Service
- Type: Heavy rail
- Rolling stock: Tobu 200 series tramcar

History
- Opened: 10 August 1910
- Closed: 24 February 1968

Technical
- Line length: 9.6 km (6.0 mi)
- Track gauge: 1,067 mm (3 ft 6 in)
- Electrification: 600 V DC

The Tōbu Nikkō Tramway (日光軌道線, Nikkō Kidōsen) was a 9.6 km (6.0 mi) tramway operated by Tobu Railway, which ran from Kokutetsu Ekimae (next to JNR Nikkō Station) to Umagaeshi in Tochigi Prefecture.
