= Fusako Fujima =

Japanese actress

- 藤間 房子
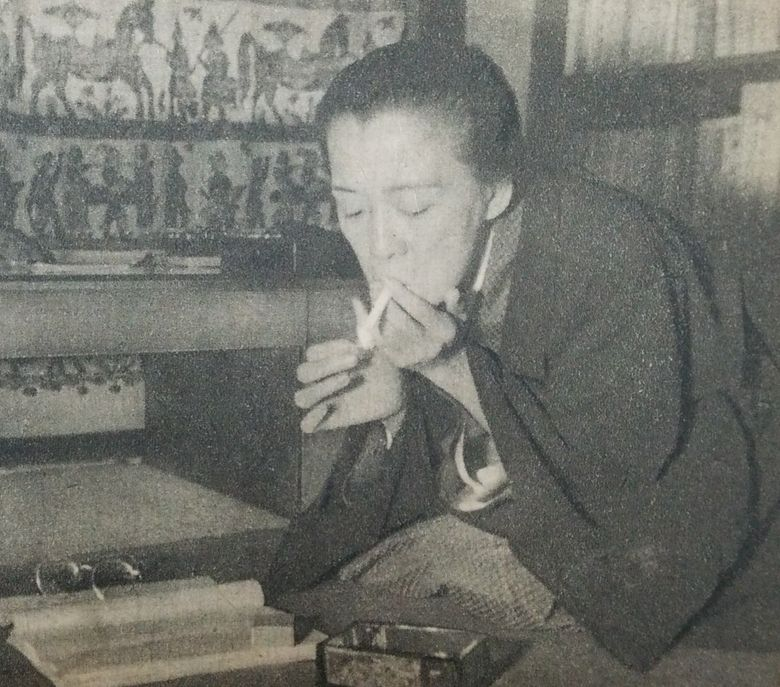
- Fujima in 1947
- Born: Ginko Yanoshima; 21 August 1882; Tokyo, Japan
- Died: 9 January 1954 (age 71)
- Occupations: Actress, dancer, singer

Fusako Fujima (Japanese: 藤間 房子; 21 August 1882 – 9 January 1954), born Ginko Yanoshima, was a Japanese actress, dancer, and singer. She was with the Imperial Theatre in the 1910s, and appeared in Japanese films in the 1930s and 1940s, including Mikio Naruse's Sincerity (1939) and Akira Kurosawa's No Regrets for Our Youth (1946).

== Early life and education ==
Ginko Yanoshima was born in Tokyo, the daughter of a paper merchant. She studied art, music, and dance, and trained for the theatre at the school of Sada Yakko. She began her stage career in the Imperial Theatre.

== Stage career ==
Fujima's early career was on the stage. She played Mistress Quickly in The Merry Wives of Windsor in Tokyo in 1912. "The fearlessness and scorn of the samurai mother, played by Miss Fusako Fujima, was a revelation of what the shy, sophisticated Japanese women can do in simulating passion," wrote an American reviewer in 1914, in Overland Monthly. She was described as "the best Japanese dancer among the actresses", in a 1915 report in The Far East, about the Imperial Theatre's "Toy Ballet". She was noted for her "comical" skills, in a 1918 article about fellow actress Ritsuko Mori, and she was described as a singer in a 1926 newspaper photo with Mori and Irish tenor John McCormack.

== Filmography ==
Fujima often played older women, wives, mothers, and grandmothers, in Japanese films made in the 1930s and 1940s by directors including Akira Kurosawa, Masahiro Makino, Teinosuke Kinugasa, Mikio Naruse, Osamu Fushimizu, and Torajiro Saito.

- Hakui no kajin (1936)
- Kokyo (1937, Hometown)
- Gonzo to Sukejyu (1937)
- Ôma no tsuji (1938)
- Magokoro (1939, Sincerity)
- Nizuma Kagame (1940)
- Shina no yoru (1940, China Night, both parts)
- Zoku Hebihimesama (1940, The Snake Princess)
- Kinō kieta otoko (1941, The Man Who Disappeared Yesterday)
- Ani no hanayome (1941)
- Waga ai no ki (1941)
- Otoko no hanamichi (1941)
- Midori no daichi (1942)
- Hanako-san (1943)
- Tokkan ekichō (1945, Station Chief of the Nonstop Train)
- Tokyo gonin otoko (1945, Five Tokyo Men)
- Hometown in Green (1946)
- Waga seishun ni kuinashi (1946, No Regrets for Our Youth)
- Waga ai wa yama no kanata ni (1948)
- Ojōsan kampai (1949, Here's to the Young Lady)
- Hakuchû no kettō (1950, Duel in the Sun)
