= Cultural Path =

Area in Nagoya

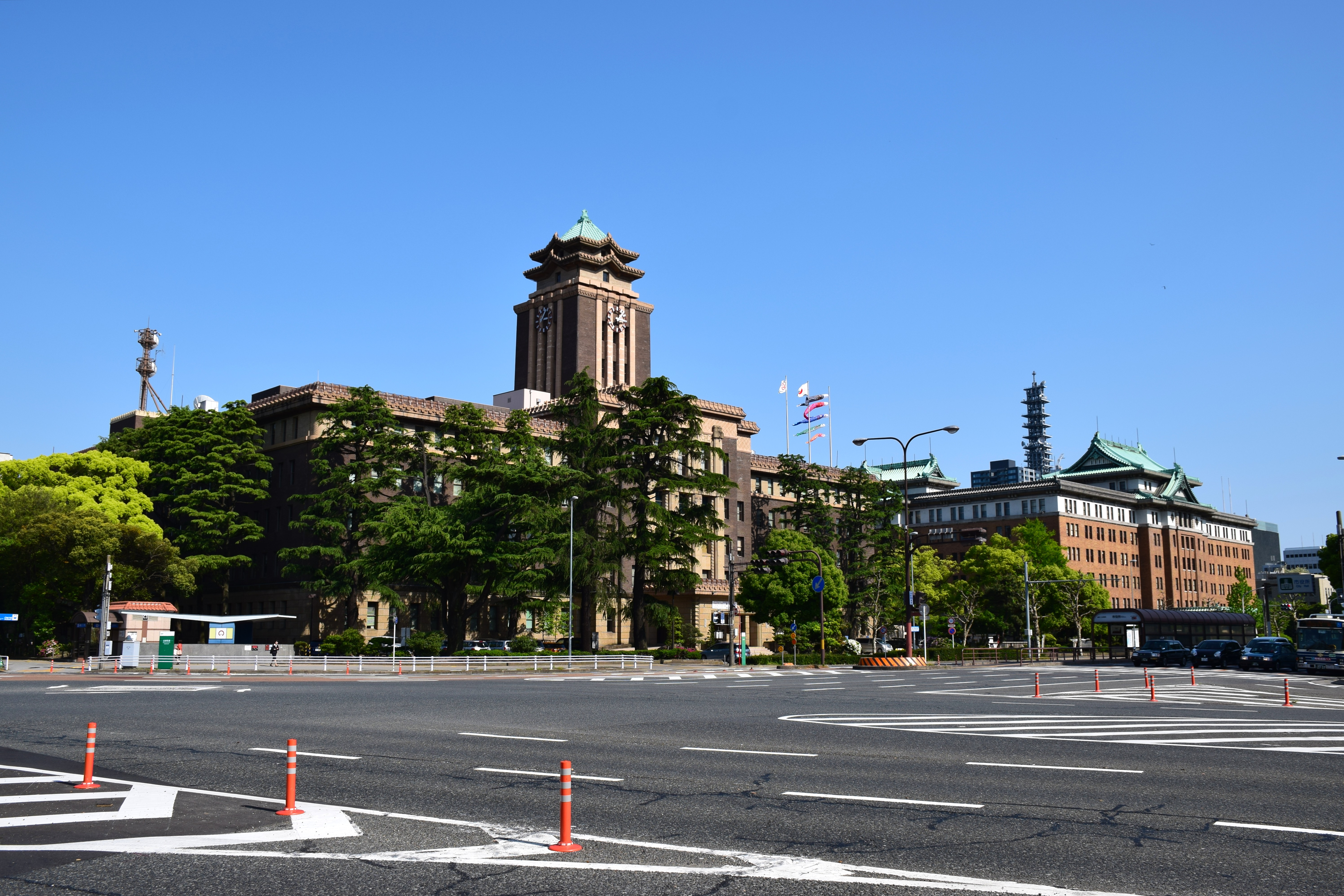
Nagoya City Hall and Aichi Prefectural Government office building

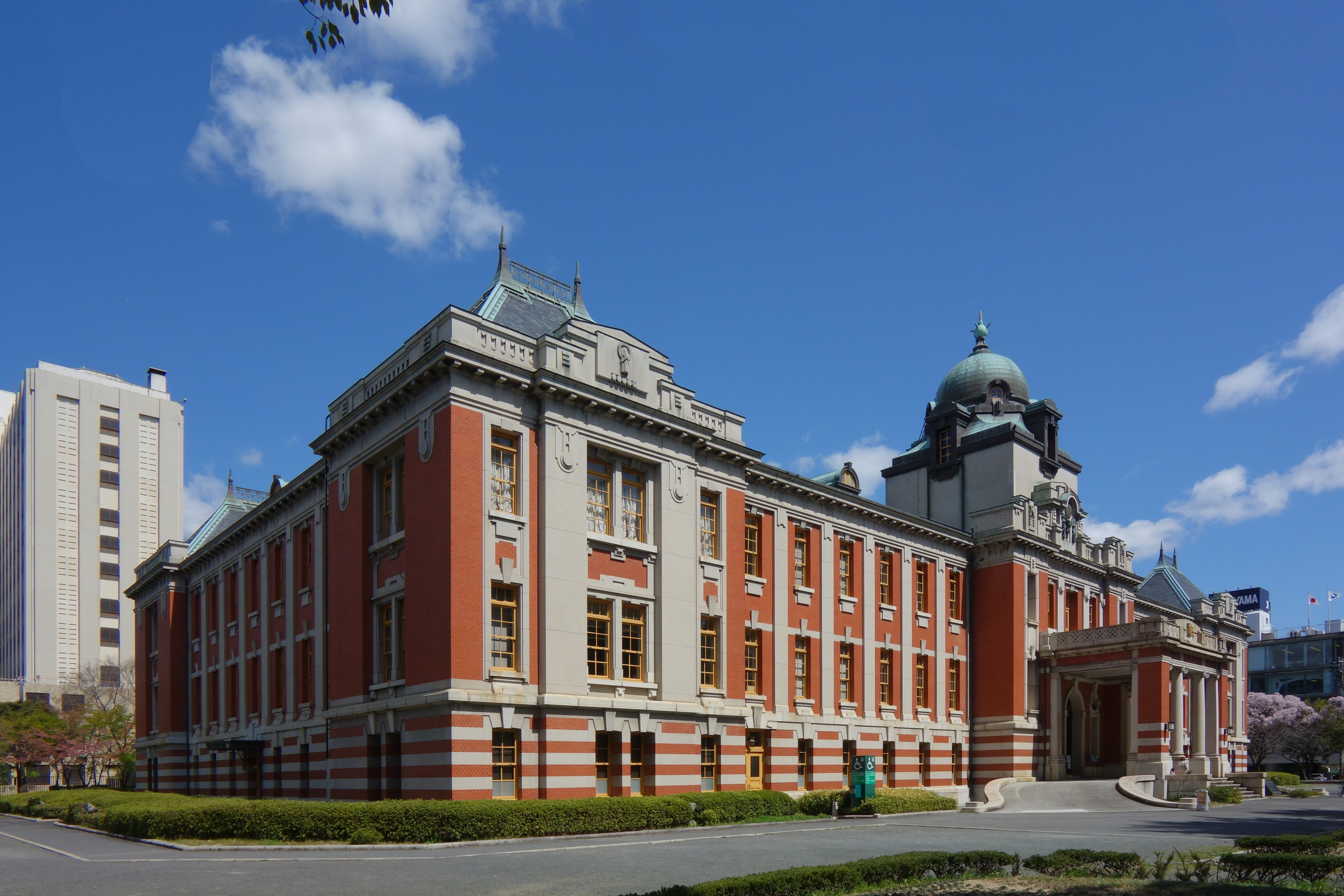
former Nagoya Court of Appeal

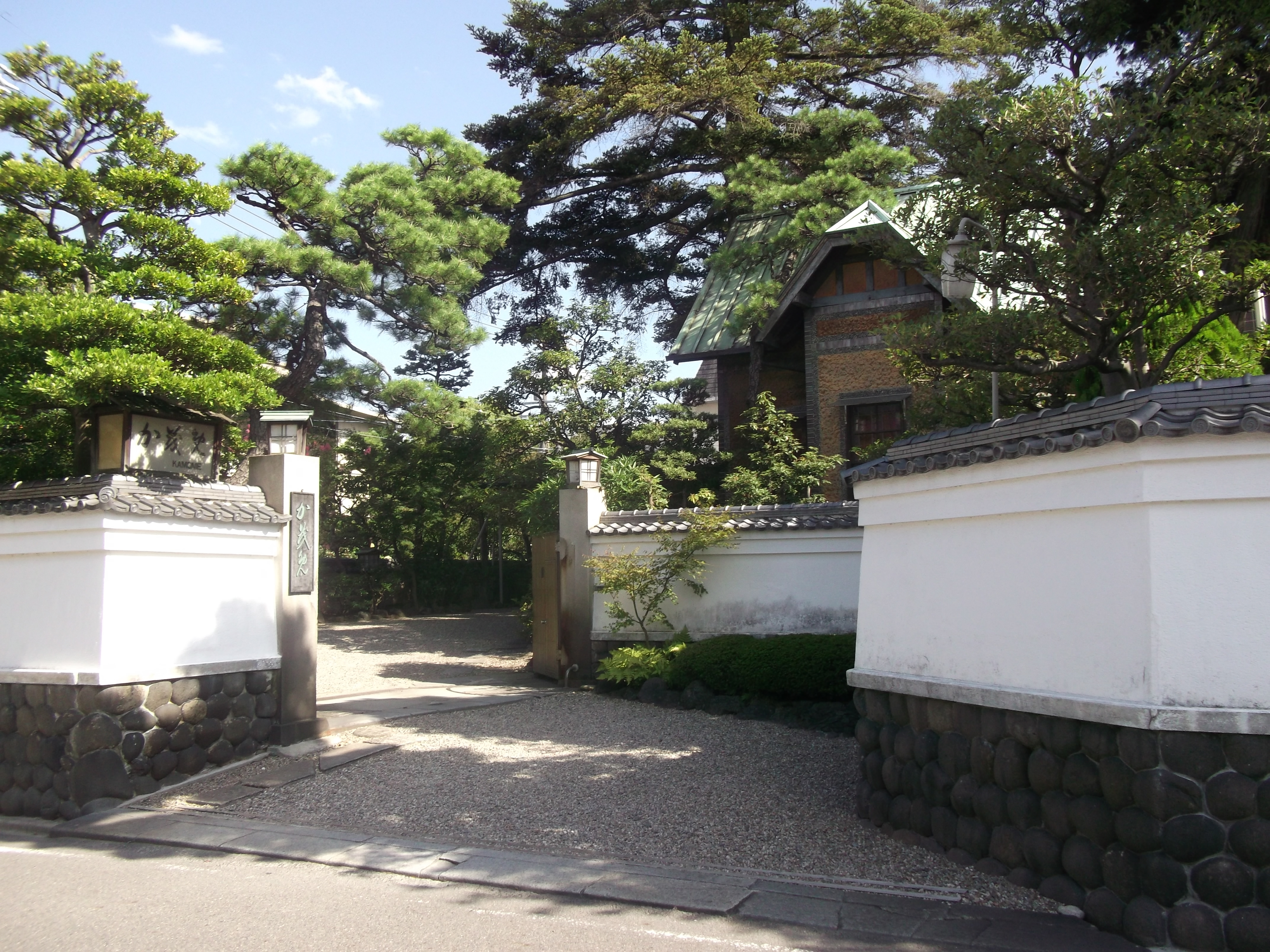
former Nakai Onorejiro House

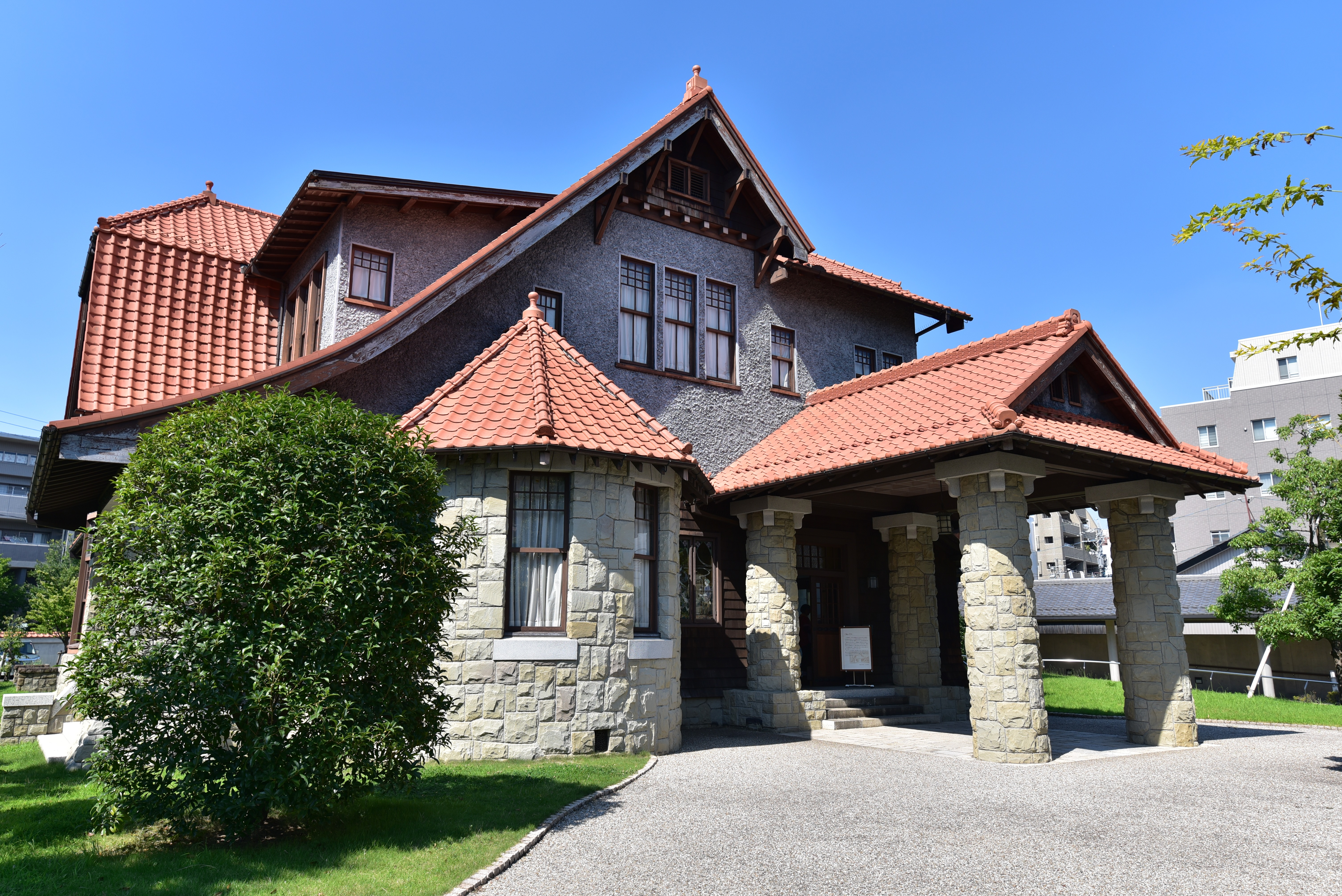
former Sadayakko Kawakami House

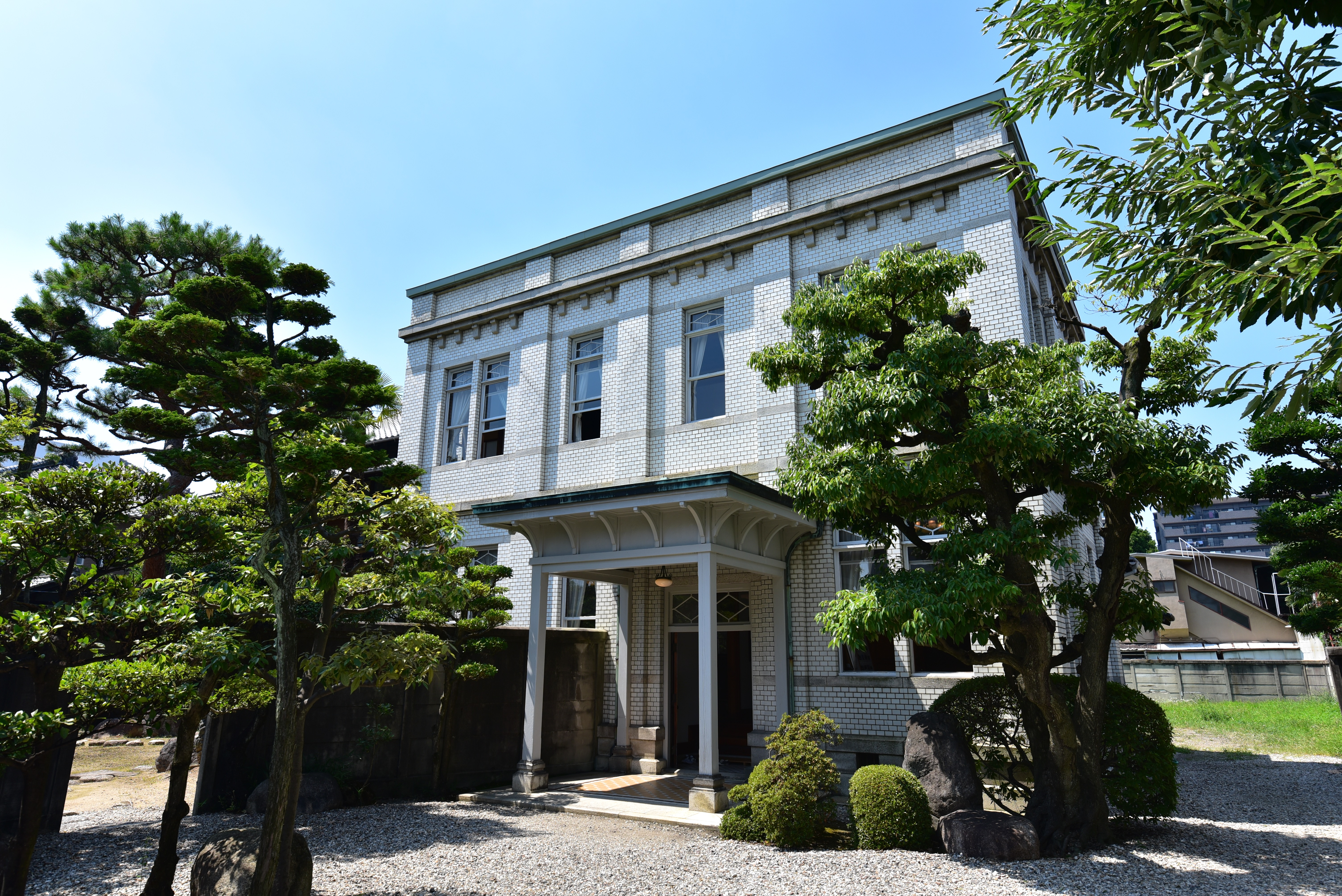
Sasuke Toyoda House

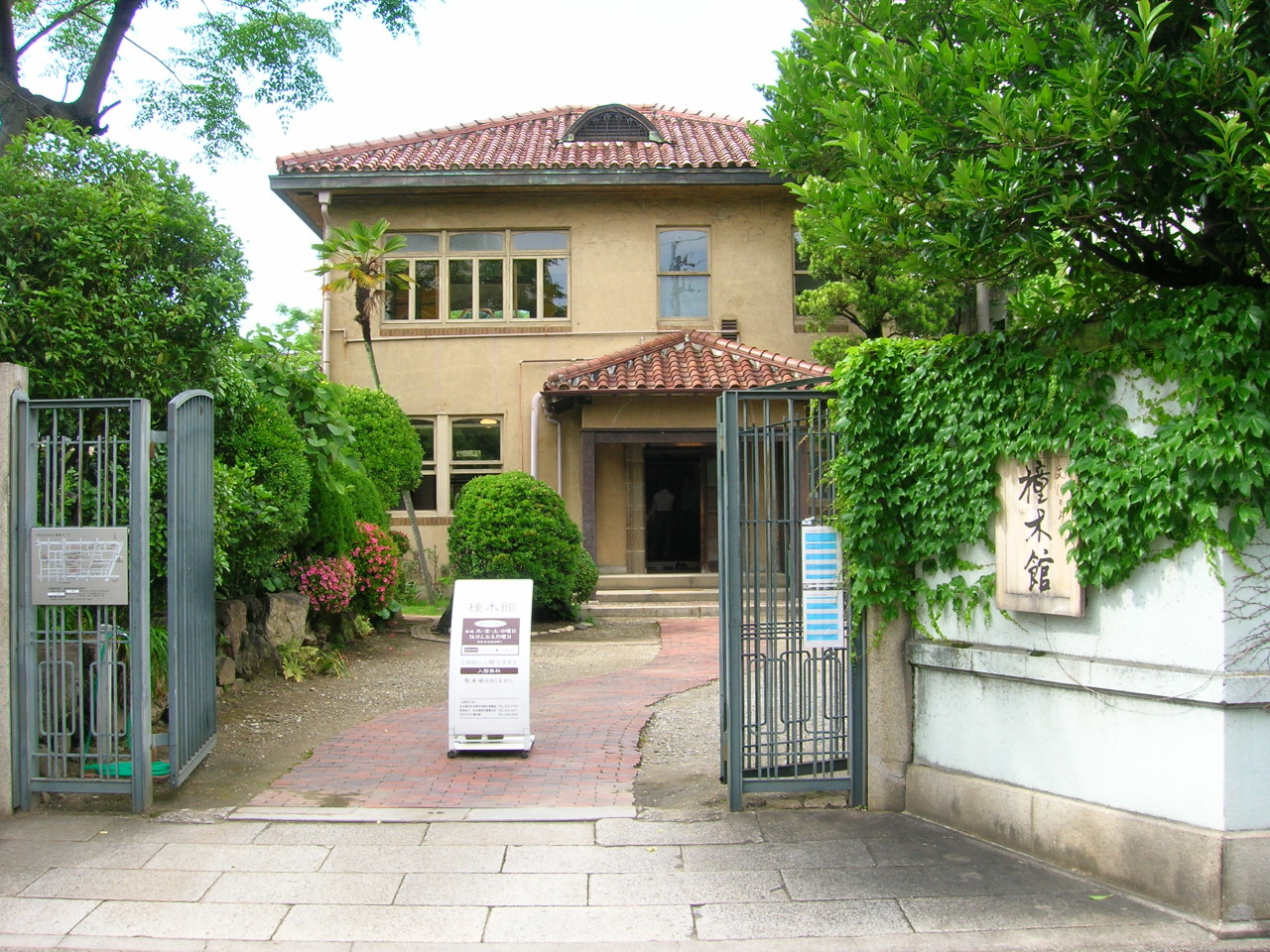
former Tamesaburo Imoto House

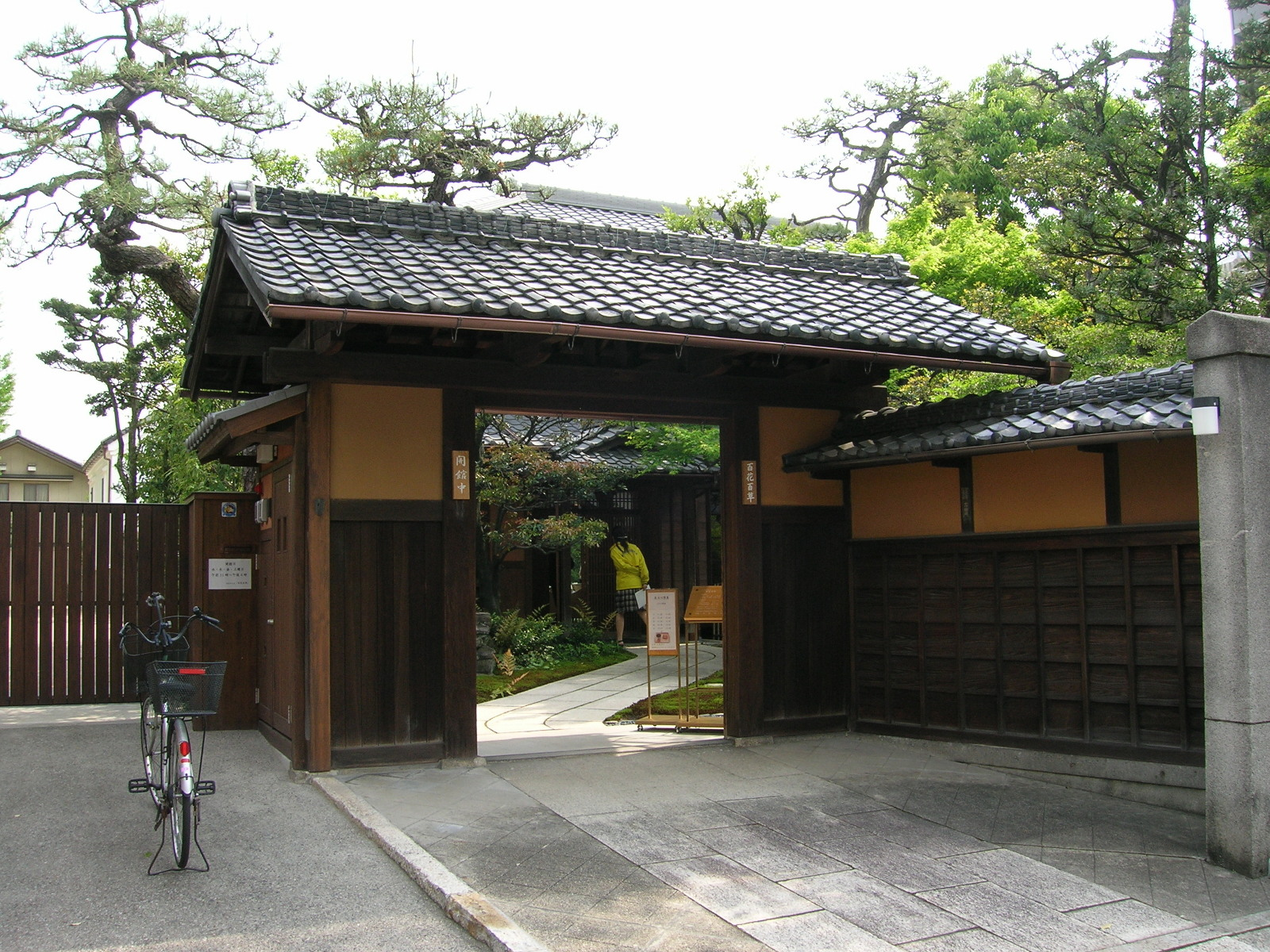
Gate to former Okaya Sosuke House

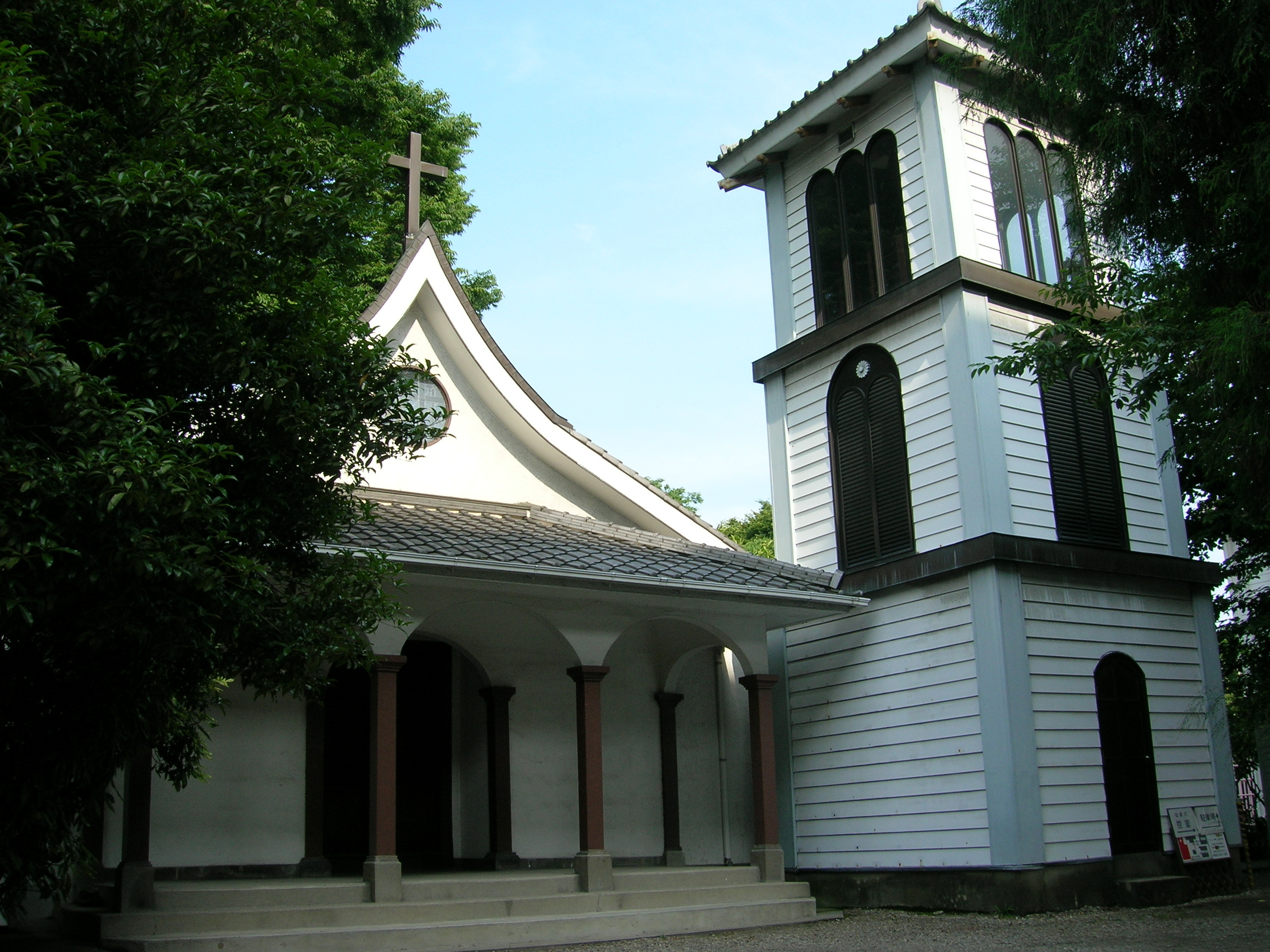
Catholic Chikaramachi Church

The Cultural Path (文化のみち, Bunka-no-michi) is located between Naka-ku and Higashi-ku in the centre of Nagoya, Japan. It shows a number of historic buildings that are under heritage protection.

The area was designated in 1999. The area's historic buildings range back from the Edo period to the Meiji era and Taishō era of the 1920s. Included in the list are mansions, government buildings, temples, and shrines. Many of them are registered as Tangible Cultural Property.

== List of such historic monuments ==
=== Brick and concrete buildings ===
- Nagoya City Hall main building, from 1933, Registered Tangible Cultural Property Important Urban Landscape Building
- Aichi Prefectural Government Office, from 1938, Registered Tangible Cultural Property Important Urban Landscape Building
- former Aichi Credit Unions Association hall, from 1933–38, today used as Aichi Prefectural Office Ōtsubashi branch
- former Nagoya Court of Appeal district courthouse, from 1922, designated as an Important Cultural Property, today used as Nagoya City Archives and municipal museum
- Kinjō Gakuin High School Keikō-kan Auditorium. 1936, Registered Tangible Cultural Property Important Urban Landscape Building
- Nagoya Ceramics Hall, 1932, architectural expressionism Art Deco design by Ichiei Takasu, Important Landscape Building
- Nagoya Municipal Tsutsui Elementary School, 1936, the only remaining pre-war primary school building in the city
- Tokai Gakuen Auditorium, 1931, Registered Tangible Cultural Property Important Urban Landscape Building
- former mansion of Nagoya mayor Toranosuke Okita, from 1920, today used as Aichi Prefecture Lawmakers Hall

=== Wooden buildings ===
- Kenchū-ji, from 1651, Registered Tangible Cultural Property, Designated Prefectural Cultural Property, Designated Cultural Property and Important Urban Landscape Building
- Sadaso-in, from 1608, built under Tokugawa Yoshimichi
- old Toyoda family house wall (Risaburo Toyoda Teiato), from 1918, Important Urban landscape Building with remaining gate and fence
- old restaurant - Camphor, Taishō era, Important Urban landscape Building
- former Nakai Onorejiro House, from 1911, today used as a restaurant
- former Tetsujiro Haruta House, from 1925, Important Traditional Building and Landscape Structure, European-style building of Design and Preservation
- former Sasuke Toyoda House, from 1923, Sakichi Toyoda's brother, traditional building
- former Sadayakko Kawakami House from 1920, today Futaba Museum of Culture, Registered Tangible Cultural Property and Important Landscape Building
- former Tamesaburo Imoto House, from 1926, today Shumoku Museum of Culture, Specified Tangible Cultural Heritage, Important Landscape Building, traditional building of townscape preservation district
- former Okaya Sosuke House, from 1920, remaining tearoom, storehouse and garden
- Chikara-machi Nagayamon, from mid-Edo period, remaining gate of Samurai mansion
- Catholic Chikaramachi Church, from 1904, Important Urban Landscape Building, oldest Catholic church in the city
- Omori's Residence, from 1916, Important Urban Landscape Building
- Ito house, from early Taishō era, Important Urban Landscape Building
- Chokyū-ji, from 1610, temple

=== Museums ===
- Nagoya Castle
- Tokugawa Art Museum, from 1935, museum exhibiting treasure of the Tokugawa Owari lords
- Hōsa Library, from 1950, public library from the collection of the Owari Tokugawa family
- Rakushi Museum, from 1987, exhibition with a focus on MatsuHana hall in the Edo era and tea utensils
- Hori Museum, from 2006, Setsuko Migishi, Yuzo Saeki, Foujita Fujita, Ryuzaburo Umehara exhibited works
- Bank of Tokyo-Mitsubishi UFJ Currency Museum, moved in spring of 2009 to the present location, opened in 1961 as the "Tokai Bank Money Museum"

=== Other ===
- Tokugawa Garden, gardens of the Tokugawa mansion around the Tokugawa museum
- Sannomaru garden, from 1881, relocated the part of the Nagoya Castle Ninomaru Gardens, including the former army officers club Kaikosha Nantei fortification
- Nanao Shrine, founded in early 16th century, Owari clan chief retainer Naruse family
- Akatsuka Shinmeisha, reconstructed under Tokugawa Yoshinao in 1619 (Kanei 5), some remaining buildings that survived the war
- Crescent mound, from 1743, Basho Matsuo fifty years death anniversary monument
