= Toagosei =

Japanese chemical manufacturer

Toagosei Co., Ltd.

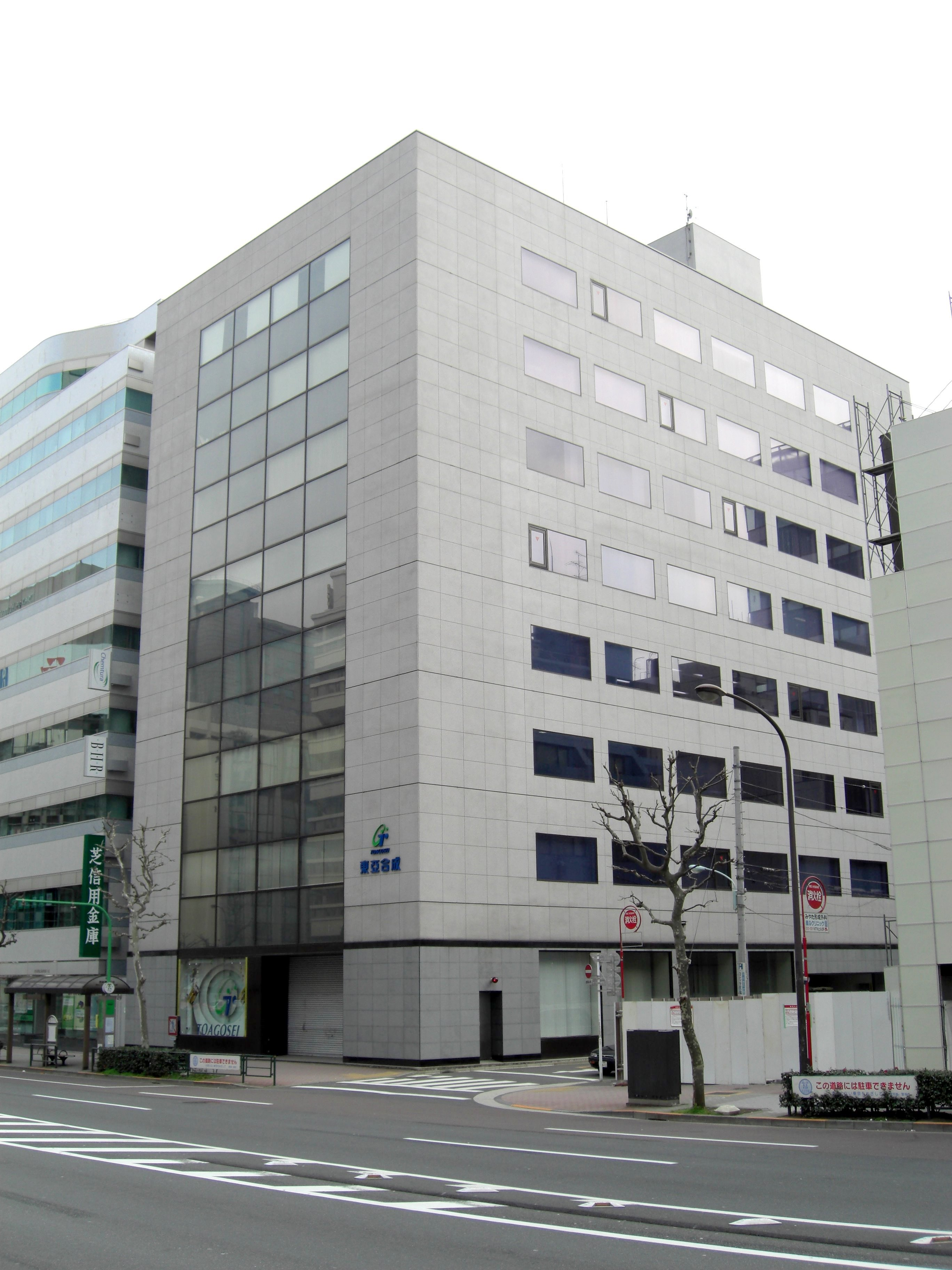
- Toagosei headquarters building in Tokyo
- Native name: 東亞合成株式会社
- Type: Public
- Traded as: TYO: 4045
- ISIN: JP3556400004
- Industry: Chemicals
- Founded: March 31, 1942; 84 years ago
- Founder: Momosuke Fukuzawa
- Headquarters: Nishi-Shinbashi, Minato-ku, Tokyo, 105-8419, Japan
- Area served: Worldwide
- Key people: Mikishi Takamura (president and CEO)
- Products: Adhesives; Acrylic polymers; Inorganic high-purity chemicals; Plastic products; Caustic soda; Sulfuric acid
- Revenue: ▼JPY 135.3 (FY 2016) (US$ 1.2 billion) (FY 2016)
- Net income: ▲JPY 13.8 billion (FY 2016) (US$ 127 million) (FY 2016)
- Number of employees: 2,411 (as of December 31, 2016)
- Website: Official website

Toagosei Co., Ltd. (東亞合成株式会社, Tōa Gōsei Kabushiki-gaisha) is a Japanese chemical company, producing cyanoacrylate adhesives since 1963. Other chemical products of the company include high purity gases, soda and chlorine products, and instant glue, which is sold in Japan as Aron Alpha and marketed in the United States as Krazy Glue.

The company was originally named Yahagi Kogyo and was founded by Momosuke Fukuzawa in 1933 with the manufacturing of ammonium sulfate, sulfuric acid, and nitric acid as its products. The present company was formed when Yahagi Kogyo merged with three other chemical companies in 1944.
