= Yacco =

Yacco may refer to:

- Sada Yacco, a Japanese geisha, actress, and dancer
- Acoma Pueblo, a village and tribe in New Mexico
