= Ritsuko =

- Gender: Female

Origin
- Origin: Japanese
- Meaning: Different meanings depending on the kanji used

Ritsuko (written: 律子 lit. "law, child", りつ子 or リツ子), is a feminine Japanese given name. Notable people with the name include:

- Ritsuko Fujiyama (藤山 律子; born 1949), Japanese actress
- Ritsuko Hiroto (born 1981), Japanese cricketer
- Ritsuko Kawai (河井 リツ子; born 1964), Japanese writer
- Ritsuko Matsuda (松田 律子; born 1977), Japanese singer
- Ritsuko Mori (森律子, 1890–1961), Japanese actress
- Ritsuko Nakayama (中山 律子; born 1942), Japanese bowler
- Ritsuko Nemoto (根本 りつ子; born 1929), Japanese actress
- Ritsuko Okazaki (岡崎 律子; 1959–2004), Japanese singer-songwriter
- Ritsuko Tanaka (田中 律子; born 1971), Japanese actress, television personality and singer
- Ritsuko Taneda (種田 律子), Japanese musician

== Fictional characters ==
- Ritsuko Akagi (赤木 リツコ), a character in the anime series Neon Genesis Evangelion
- Ritsuko Akizuki (秋月 律子), a character in the video game series THE iDOLM@STER
- Ritsuko Chikanari, a character in the video game Yandere Simulator
- Ritsuko Sakakibara (榊原 律子), a character in the novel Another
