= Kawakami Otojirō =

Japanese actor and comedian (1864-1911)

Otojirō Kawakami
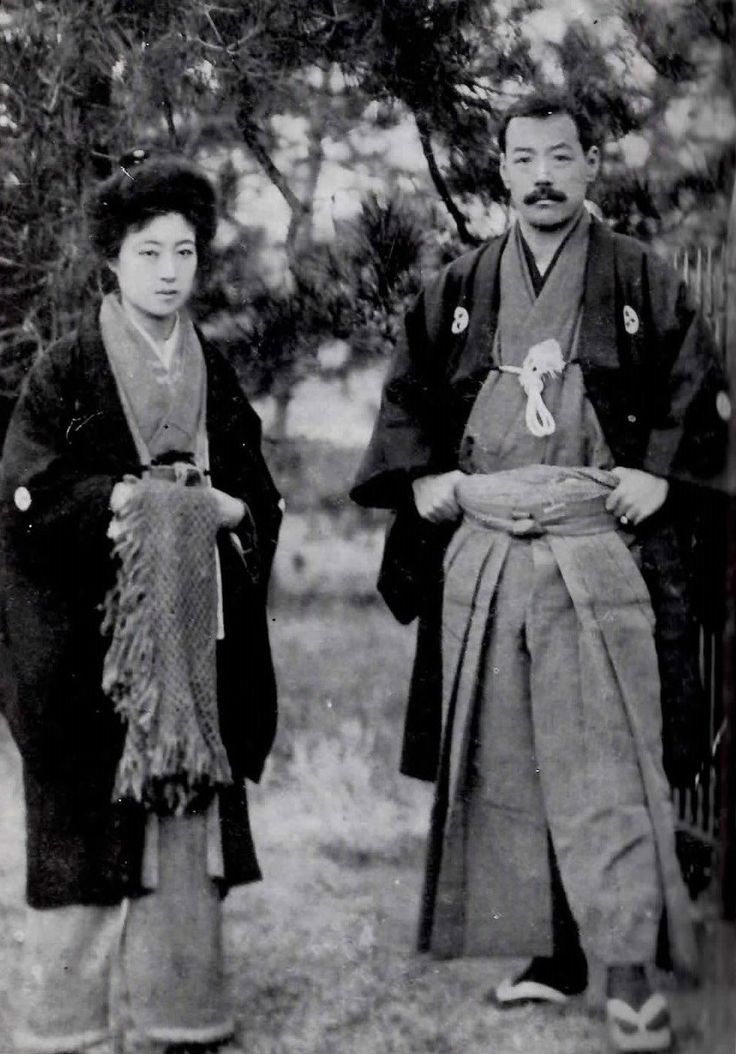
- Kawakami Otojirō (right) with his wife Sada Yacco
- Born: February 8, 1864; Japan Hakata-ku, Fukuoka
- Died: November 11, 1911 (aged 47)
- Other name: 川上 音二郎
- Occupations: actor, comedian
- Spouse: Sado Sadayakko
- Relatives: Tsuru Aoki (niece)

Kawakami Otojirō (川上 音二郎; Japanese pronunciation: [ka.wa.ka.mʲi (|) o.toꜜ.(d)ʑi.ɾoː], 8 February 1864 – 11 November 1911) was a Japanese actor and comedian.

== Early life ==
Kawakami was born in present-day Hakata-ku, Fukuoka on the island of Kyushu, "the second son of a second son" of a merchant family. At age eleven his mother died, and when he didn't get along with his stepmother he stowed away on a cargo ship to Osaka.

Taking odd jobs to support himself, at eighteen he became a policeman in Kyoto. "Shortly after that, fired by the political turmoil and the strident calls for democracy, he had joined Itagaki Taisuke's Liberal party (Liberal Party of Japan (1881)) as a radical, rabble-rousing soshi agitator.....Soon his scurrilous tongue and subversive speeches were getting him into trouble. He was arrested time and time again- a hundred and eighty times in all, he bragged. At nineteen he was banned from speaking in public in Kyoto for a year and from using the name "Liberty Kid" (自由童子). He also went to prison six times."

== Career ==
=== Beginnings ===
Kawakami was inspired to start his own acting troupe after receiving acting training under a rakugo master and after seeing the shosei shibai ("student theater" or "amateur theater") of fellow activist Sadanori Sudo, which "aimed at being realistic, just like in the West, and thus could claim to be following government directives to be as Western as possible in every possible way. … Far from being career-driven professionals, like the kabuki actors, they portrayed themselves as romantic, devil-may-care bohemians. Their amateur status freed them from all the constraints and conventions of the traditional theater." Under the influence of philosopher Chomin Nakae, Kawakami began staging theatre productions as an outlet for his political views.

In 1888, Kawakami developed a satirical song that would make him famous. At the end of his troupe's play "The true story of our Itagaki's disaster" (based on a failed 1882 assassination of the aforementioned Itagaki) "a lone figure wearing a jaunty white headband swaggered out and with a flourish knelt in macho samurai-style, his knees spread wide apart, in front of a gold leaf screen...He was wearing a red samurai surcoat with exaggerated pointed shoulders above a plaid men's kimono....Flourishing a black fan emblazoned with a red rising sun...while a rhythmic shamisen strummed, he spat out the words in a husky rapid-fire patter, improvising verses as he went along. He sneered at the government, the rich, and the kind of people who dressed in Western clothes, aped Western ways, and spent all their money on geisha....The catchy chorus--'Oppekepe'-imitated the sound of a bugle or a trumpet:

In these days when the price of rice is rising,
You completely ignore the plight of the poor.
Covering your eyes with tall hats,
Wearing gold rings and watches,
You bow to men of influence and position
And spend your money on geisha and entertainers. …
If you think you can get to Paradise
By … using a bribe when you encounter
The King of Hades in hell, you'll never make it!
Oppekeppe, oppekepeppo, peppoppo.

This satirical song is historically recognized as a prominent example of sōshi enka (political street songs of the Meiji period). Its format and lyrical style influenced the development of narrative singing traditions in early modern Japan, bridging the gap between traditional folk music and modern popular genres. Impressed by this troupe, then-Prime Minister Itō Hirobumi invited them to a private party where he would introduce Kawakami to one of his favorite geisha, the woman her Western fans would later dub Sada Yacco.

From January to May 1893, under the suggestion of a mutual friend Baron Kentaro Kaneko, Otojirō traveled to Paris to study European theater and learn how to improve his troupe's success. The innovations he instituted on his return, from lighting nothing but the stage and using only electric lights to using only light coatings of makeup and speaking naturally, "could no longer be dismissed as 'student theater.' It was a radical new drama in its own right—New Wave theater, shinpa." Five months after his return, he and Sada Yacco were married.

"Otojirō had a genius for giving the public what it wanted. He had a string of hits with some spine-tingling melodramas based on contemporary events. … But he could never break free of his money problems. Right in the middle of a successful run his debtors would appear with a demand or bailiffs would come to seize some of his property." In an attempt to overcome his financial problems, Otojirō decided to construct his own theater the Kamakami-za, "one of Japan's very first modern theaters, designed on the French model with electric lighting throughout and no hanamichi … instead of being open and welcoming like an old-style Japanese theater, with slatted wooden doors that slid out of the way and an upper floor displaying colorful posters of the latest production, it was a hefty three-story brick-and-stone building in the Palladian style with narrow doors, small windows, and a large auditorium. Emblazoned on the proscenium arch above the stage, framed within a frieze of chrysanthemums, was the legend THEATRE KAWAKAMI." With a deposit of fifty thousand yen, it took three years to construct and had its grand opening on June 6, 1896.

=== Political campaign ===
Despite their success, the newly named Kawakami Theatre Troupe was still beset with debt. Otojirō thus decided to run for the Japanese Diet. Moving the couple to "a six-sided Western-style house" in the village of Omori, Kawakami threw a large outdoor campaign celebration and courted the wealthy landowners and geisha of the area, even employing his wife to contact her previous geisha clients. "The press, however, was implacably hostile. Here was he, a riverbed beggar, an outcast, barely human, daring to think of sullying the purity of parliament with his presence. Even national papers targeted his small local campaign." The negative press would ultimately lead to Otojirō's defeat, putting the Kawakamis even deeper in debt.

"Desperately depressed," the couple decided to buy a small sailboat and escape to Kobe. At each village they stopped at they would exchange stories for lodging. The newspapers, catching wind of this, reported on the couple with such furor that upon their arrival in Kobe large crowds gathered to greet them. Adding to the sensation was Otojirō, who, being "an inveterate self-publicist, sent off letters to the papers reporting their progress and declaring that they were on their way to Korea or possibly Shanghai, to board a ship for Europe."

=== First overseas tour (1899–1901) ===
While in Kobe, the couple met Japanese impresario Kushibiki Yumindo, who, hoping to improve his business providing all things Japanese to the West, offered to sponsor their theater troupe on a tour across the United States. They immediately accepted and gathered a troupe, setting sail for San Francisco on April 30, 1899. Over the next two years, the Kawakami troupe would tour theaters in the United States, London, and Paris, becoming the first Japanese theatre company to ever tour the West.

Otojirō, no doubt in consultation with Yakko, had pondered long and hard about what would best suit Western audiences. New Wave drama depended on language and was too tied to current events to travel well. Instead he presented some of the most famous and well-loved scenes from kabuki plays. These were timeless and would be exotic for what he judged to be Western taste. He cut back the dialogue, which, being in Japanese, would be incomprehensible to the audience, and beefed up the visual elements, putting in plenty of dancing, exciting sword fights, and comic interludes.

He also simplified the plays and cut them to digestible lengths. When the troupe performed to Japanese audiences, two plays had taken up the entire day. For the Americans he had crammed four into two and a half hours. ... Otojirō was later panned for having offered up bastardized kabuki to Western audiences. But his changes, though radical, were not entirely outside the spirit of the traditional theater.... In the past kabuki had been every bit as subversive as Otojirō’s New Wave theater.” Beyond theatrical innovation, this tour contributed to a more nuanced Western understanding of Japanese performance. At a time when Western exhibitions often featured stereotypical displays, the Kawakami troupe presented Japanese drama as a structured theatrical tradition, receiving attention from contemporary Western theater critics.

==== Repertoire ====
In San Francisco, the troupe performed four pieces:

- The Duel (Sayaate/"Clashing Swordhilts") – two samurai, one handsome and heroic and one comic (Otojirō), fight for the attention of the same Yoshiwara courtesan (Yakko)
- The Royalist (Kusunoki or Kojima Takanori) – a patriotic drama with "vividly realistic fights. It ended with a dramatic battle in which swords flashed and the actors leapt around, performing agile judo throws."
- The Maiden at Dōjō-ji Temple (Musume Dōjō-ji) – a woman (Yakko) is scorned by a monk and, pursuing him to a temple, kills him in her fury
- Dewey Day Celebration on the Pine-Fringed Shores of Miho (Miho no Matsubara) – a series of folk dances celebrating Admiral George Dewey "who had overseen the destruction of a Spanish flotilla in Manila Bay at the start of the Spanish–American War the previous year"

For their first performance in Chicago, the group performed "The Royalist" and "The Maiden" to great success.

By the time the troupe arrived in Boston, they had developed Geisha and the Knight, a pastiche that became a universal success throughout America and Europe. As Sadayakko remembered it, "It was a queer mixture of Japanese plays, but it appealed to the American mind with love, and delighted with our gorgeous costumes."

"The Geisha and the Knight," also billed in mock Japanese as Geisha to Somaray, was the highlight of their repertoire. It was a stroke of genius—a knitting together of The Duel (Sayaate) and the hugely popular Dojoji to make a single drama. The new play embodied all their strengths—thrillingly choreographed fight scenes, humor, split-second costume changes, and gorgeous scenery. Above all it provided the perfect showcase for Yakko's exquisite dancing and spine-tingling death scene.

The first act, "The Duel," is set in the Yoshiwara pleasure quarters, before a spectacular backdrop showing a street of wooden teahouses fading in sharp perspective into the distance. Cherry trees laden with brilliant pink blossoms adorn the stage. A beautiful geisha has rejected the advances of a boorish samurai named Banza in favor of her true love, Nagoya. Banza challenges Nagoya, striking his sword hilt. A fierce battle ensues between the two samurai and their bands of retainers, with plenty of energetic sword play, hand-to-hand combat, and acrobatic throws.

For the second act, "Dojoji," Yakko's piece de resistance, had been subtly altered so as to merge seamlessly with the first. The backdrop was the temple courtyard with a great bell covered by a tiled roof and mountains in the background. There the geisha has discovered that Nagoya is betrothed to another. He and his bride-to-be have fled into the temple grounds. She dances before the gates, trying to seduce the monks into allowing her to pass. Then the bride-to-be appears and the geisha tries to kill her, but is prevented by the samurai. Loosing her luxuriant waist-length tresses, which fly about like a lion's mane, she turns into a raging fury and dies of a broken heart in her lover's arms.

=== Second overseas tour (1901–1902) ===
Otojirō and Yakko, eager to tour Europe once again, organized a new acting troupe of twenty actors, including a female actress and four geisha. On April 10, 1901 the troupe set sail for London, arriving on June 4 of the same year. After touring several cities in Germany, Austria, Hungary, Russia, Italy, Spain, France, and Belgium, the troupe returned to Japan on August 19, 1902.

== Later years ==
"In the West the pair had introduced Japanese plays in a palatable form with stunning success. Now they intended to repeat that success at home, by introducing Western plays in a palatable form to Japanese audiences. Having already produced their own Merchant of Venice to surprising acclaim in the West...the couple wanted to make Shakespeare's powerful dramas accessible to everyone. With these startingly new, realistic, and up-to-the-minute plays, they hoped to lure into the theater new audiences, who had been put off by the stylization and old-fashioned forms of kabuki."

Performances included revised versions of Othello and Hamlet, as well as the German play The Trial of the Fox for the newly created otogi shibai("fairy-tale theater") for children. When the Russo-Japanese War broke out in 1904, the Kawakami Troupe produced The Battle Report Drama based on what troupe members themselves observed on the front. "In 1906 Yakko starred in Maurice Maeterlinck's Monna Vanna, the dramatic tragedy of a suffragette-era New Woman. She also played Dona Rafaele in Patrie! (play) by Victorien Sardou, the author of Tosca. Both were parts that Sarah Bernhardt had made her own. Yakko, still Japan's sole actress, was determined to prove herself worthy of her billing as 'the Sarah Bernhardt of Japan.'"

In July 1907, Otojirō and Yakko assembled a group of eight to study in Paris "every aspect of Western theater"—theater design, stage management, scenery, props, music, and acting techniques.

Upon their return the next May, the Kawakamis established two new institutions: the Imperial Actress Training Institute, the country's first school of aspiring actresses, and the Imperial Theatre in Osaka to permanently house the troupe, opening February 15, 1910.

"It was a magnificently playful piece of architecture, like an Edwardian music hall transposed to Japan and embellished with Japanese flourishes. Built of brick and stone, it had decorative mock-Ionic pillars, three imposing arched entranceways topped with balconies, and a motif of the rising sun in white stone splashed across the rounded tops of the windows at either end of the building. Inside there was an area of tatami matting and rows of rather hard wooden benches. The upper circles were narrow, like promenade circles, with swagged velvet drapes reminiscent of the Criterion Theatre, where the troupe had performed in London. The domed ceiling was adorned with curvaceous Art Nouveau motifs. The curtain featured an elaborate portrayal of a Shinto goddess performing an erotic dance, a famous scene from Japanese mythology. The lighting and stage machinery were the very latest Western imports but there was also a hanamichi walkway, a revolving stage, and an orchestra box, as in a kabuki theater. It was Japan's most up-to-the-minute theater."

After a week of dance performances by Sadayakko and her acting institute, the Imperial Theater hosted a loose adaptation of Around the World in Eighty Days, a science fiction piece entitled Star Worlds (to show off the theater's new lighting technology), an adaptation of The Student Prince, and La Dame aux Camelias featuring Yakko as Margeurite.

== Death ==
During the summer of 1911 the Kawakami Troupe embarked on a tour of Japan. Upon their return to Osaka, while working on an adaptation of An Enemy of the People, Otojirō began to suffer from a swelling abdomen. "Complaining of dreadful weakness and nausea," Otojirō was diagnosed with abdominal dropsy with complications from inflammation of his appendix area. (Otojirō had had his appendix removed while performing in Boston, but would suffer from pain and inflammation in that area for many years after.)

Despite abdominal surgery, Otojirō fell into a coma after several days and it was revealed that the inflammation had spread to his brain.

At 3 AM on November 11, seeming to be on the point of death, Otojirō was carried from the hospital to the Imperial Theatre at Yakko's request. There on the stage, surrounded by his wife, son Raikichi, relatives, and fellow Kawakami actors, he would die three hours later.

Otojirō was buried at Jotenji, a Zen temple on the outskirts of Hakata. A lock of his hair was buried at Sengakuji, the Kawakami family temple. Sengakuji was also to be the site of a near life-size bronze statue Sada had commissioned of him; however, "the local worthies were horrified. They did not want a statue of a 'riverbed beggar' defiling their revered temple. It would be a pernicious influence on children, they protested, who might even think of following the same disgraceful profession." It would not be until September 1914 that the statue would instead be erected at Tokyo's Yanaka Cemetery.

== Legacy and impact on Japanese theater ==
Kawakami is recognized by theater historians as a foundational figure in the development of shinpa (New School) theater. By blending the political agitation of the Freedom and People's Rights Movement with Western theatrical realism, he helped dismantle the rigid conventions of traditional kabuki.

Furthermore, his introduction of Western stagecraft to Japan—notably the construction of the Kawakami-za with its proscenium arch and electric lighting—significantly influenced the technical standards of Japanese performance venues. This transitional shinpa style subsequently paved the way for the emergence of shingeki (New Theater) in the early 20th century.

== Sources ==
- Leslie Downer (2004). Madame Sadayakko: The Geisha who Bewitched the West (reprint ed.). Gotham Books. ISBN 9781592400508.
