= A Promise (1986 film) =

1986 Japanese film

- DVD cover
- Directed by: Yoshishige Yoshida
- Written by: Yoshishige Yoshida; Shuichi Sae (novel)
- Produced by: Shigeyuki Yajima; Matsuo Takahashi; Yasuyo Saito
- Starring: Rentarō Mikuni; Sachiko Murase
- Cinematography: Yoshihiro Yamazaki
- Edited by: Akira Suzuki
- Music by: Haruomi Hosono
- Distributed by: Toho
- Release date: 13 September 1986 (Japan)
- Running time: 124 minutes
- Country: Japan
- Language: Japanese

A Promise (Japanese: 人間の約束, Hepburn: Ningen no yakusoku; lit. Human Promise) is a 1986 Japanese drama film written and directed by Yoshishige Yoshida.

== Cast ==
- Rentarō Mikuni as Ryosaku Morimoto
- Sachiko Murase as Tatsu, Ryosaku's wife
- Choichiro Kawarazaki as Yoshio, Ryosaku's son
- Orie Satoh as Ritsuko, Yoshio's wife
- Kōichi Satō as Detective Yoshikawa
- Tetta Sugimoto as Takao, Yoshio's son
- Reiko Tajima as Saeko Nogawa
- Choei Takahashi as Takeya Nakamura
- Kumiko Takeda as Naoko, Yoshio's daughter
- Tomisaburo Wakayama as Detective Tagami
- Masakane Yonekura as Detective Miura

== Release ==
A Promise was screened in the Un Certain Regard section at the 1986 Cannes Film Festival.
