= Sincerity (1939 film) =

1939 Japanese film

- Film poster

Japanese name
- Kanji: まごころ
- Directed by: Mikio Naruse
- Written by: Mikio Naruse; Yōjirō Ishizaka (short story)
- Produced by: Ryō Takei
- Starring: Etchan; Teruko Kato; Takako Irie; Sachiko Murase; Minoru Takada
- Cinematography: Hiroshi Suzuki
- Edited by: Tamae Ide
- Music by: Tadashi Hattori
- Production company: Toho
- Distributed by: Toho
- Release date: 10 August 1939 (Japan)
- Running time: 67 minutes
- Country: Japan
- Language: Japanese

Sincerity (Japanese: まごころ, romanized: Magokoro) is a 1939 Japanese drama film written and directed by Mikio Naruse. It is based on a short story by Yōjirō Ishizaka.

== Plot ==
In a small countryside town, the schoolyear has ended. While Tomiko, daughter of a single mother and of lower middle-class descent, has been ranked the best pupil in her class, her classmate and friend Nobuko, daughter of a seemingly intact upper-class family, has been ranked only tenth. During a discussion between Mrs. Asada and her husband Keikichi about Nobuko's low grades and her new teacher, whom Mrs. Asada holds responsible, it is revealed that Keikichi, who had been adopted into his wife's family, and Tomiko's mother Tsuta had once been in love. In tears, Mrs. Asada blames him for still feeling attracted to her, overheard by Nobuko. The next day, Nobuko tells Tomiko of her parents' conversation, and both start crying when they get into an argument over their different families. Later, when Nobuko is hurt during a bathing trip, Tomiko calls her mother for help, which leads to a short, polite but distanced encounter between Tsuta and Keikichi. Keikichi sends Tomiko an exclusive French doll as a means of thanking her, but Tomiko senses her mother's unease with the gift and returns it to the Asadas. Mrs. Asada confronts her husband with his gift to Tomiko, and is in return scolded by him for her continuous complaints. When he reveals that he has just received his draft notice, she apologises for her selfishness, to which he replies, "now I can go to war without worries". In the last scene, the two girls and their mothers are seen side by side among a cheering crowd, waving goodbye to Keikichi and the new recruits on their way to the front.

== Cast ==
- Etchan as Nobuko
- Teruko Kato as Tomiko
- Takako Irie as Tsuta, Tomiko's mother
- Sachiko Murase as Mrs. Asada, Nobuko's mother
- Minoru Takada as Keikichi Asada, Nobuko's father
- Sōji Kiyokawa as Iwata, the teacher
- Fusako Fujima as Tomiko's grandmother

== Reception ==
Naruse biographer Catherine Russell names Sincerity, together with his 1939 The Whole Family Works, as the director's two key films of this period and the "link between Naruse's prewar and postwar shoshimin-eiga". According to Russell, the director had complained about interventions of the censorship board in this film, which she calls a "home front film", yet points out that the "wartime context is little more than a backdrop", emphasising its "quiet pastoral beauty". Dan Sallitt notices overall sharp behavioural detail and subtle dialogue, but an unfulfilling structure and vague character motivation in the film's climax, speculating if these shortcomings result from censorship intervention which would not allow for the character of Keikichi, a symbol of Japanese military zeal, as a subject of criticism.
