= Tsukitani Hatsuko =

Japanese ceramist

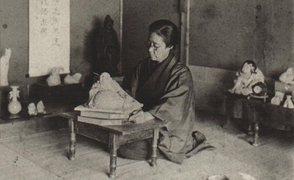
Tsukitani Hatsuko with one of her sculptural works (photo before 1945)

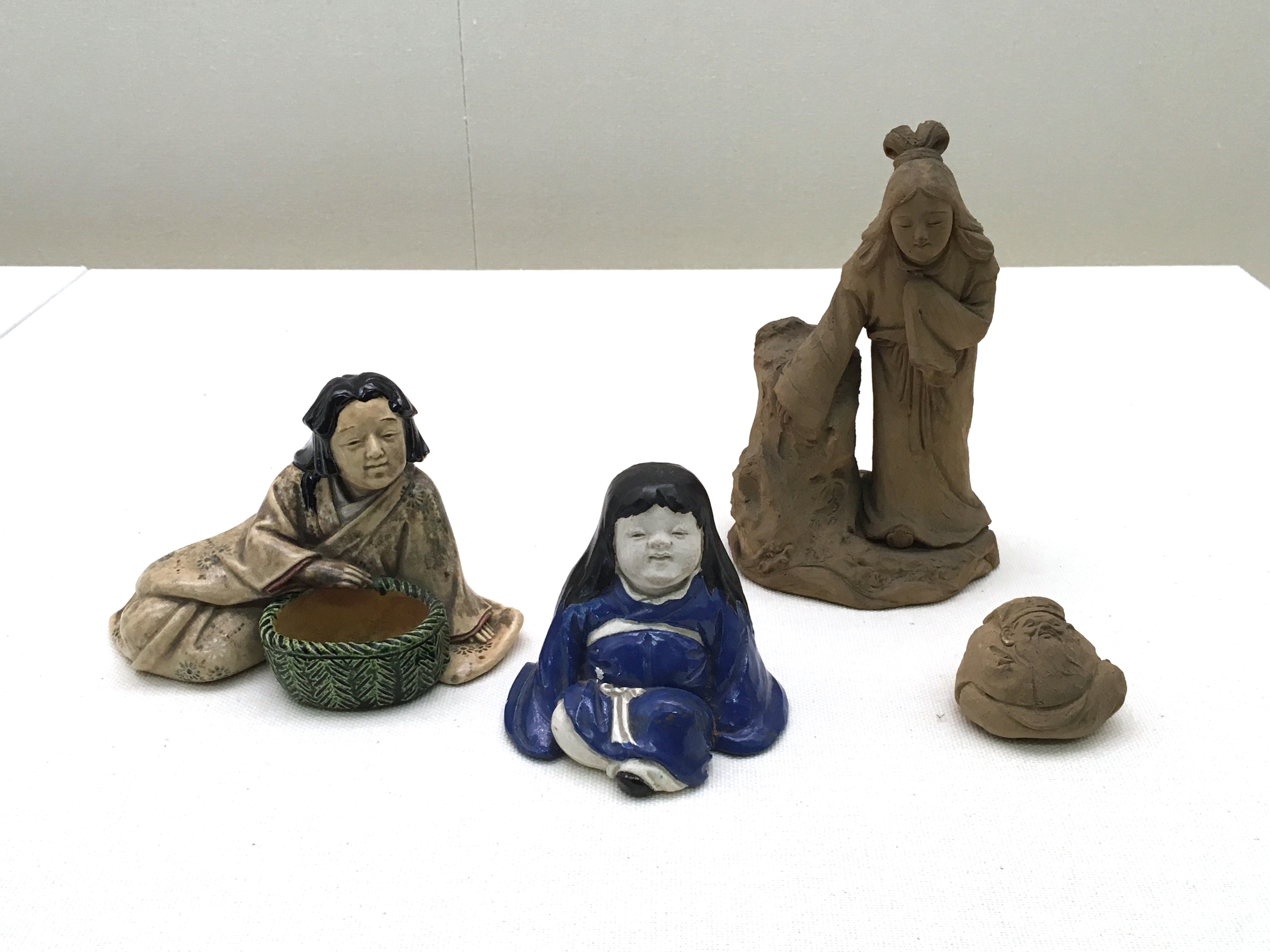
Tsukitani ware sculptures, Taishō and early Shōwa eras

Tsukitani Hatsuko (月谷初子) (1869–1945) was a Japanese ceramics artist.

She was born in Tokyo, and after studying sculpture, she trained at various kilns. From 1915 (Taishō 4) to 1932 (Shōwa 7), she set up ceramic ateliers in Gokiso and Moriyama in Nagoya. She was also a pioneer of female artists in sculpture and pottery.

Her work is known as Tsukitani ware (月谷焼).

== See also ==
- Sada Yacco, contemporary artist who also lived in Nagoya
