= Catholic Chikaramachi Church =

Church building in Japan

Coordinates: 35°10′51″N 136°54′52″E

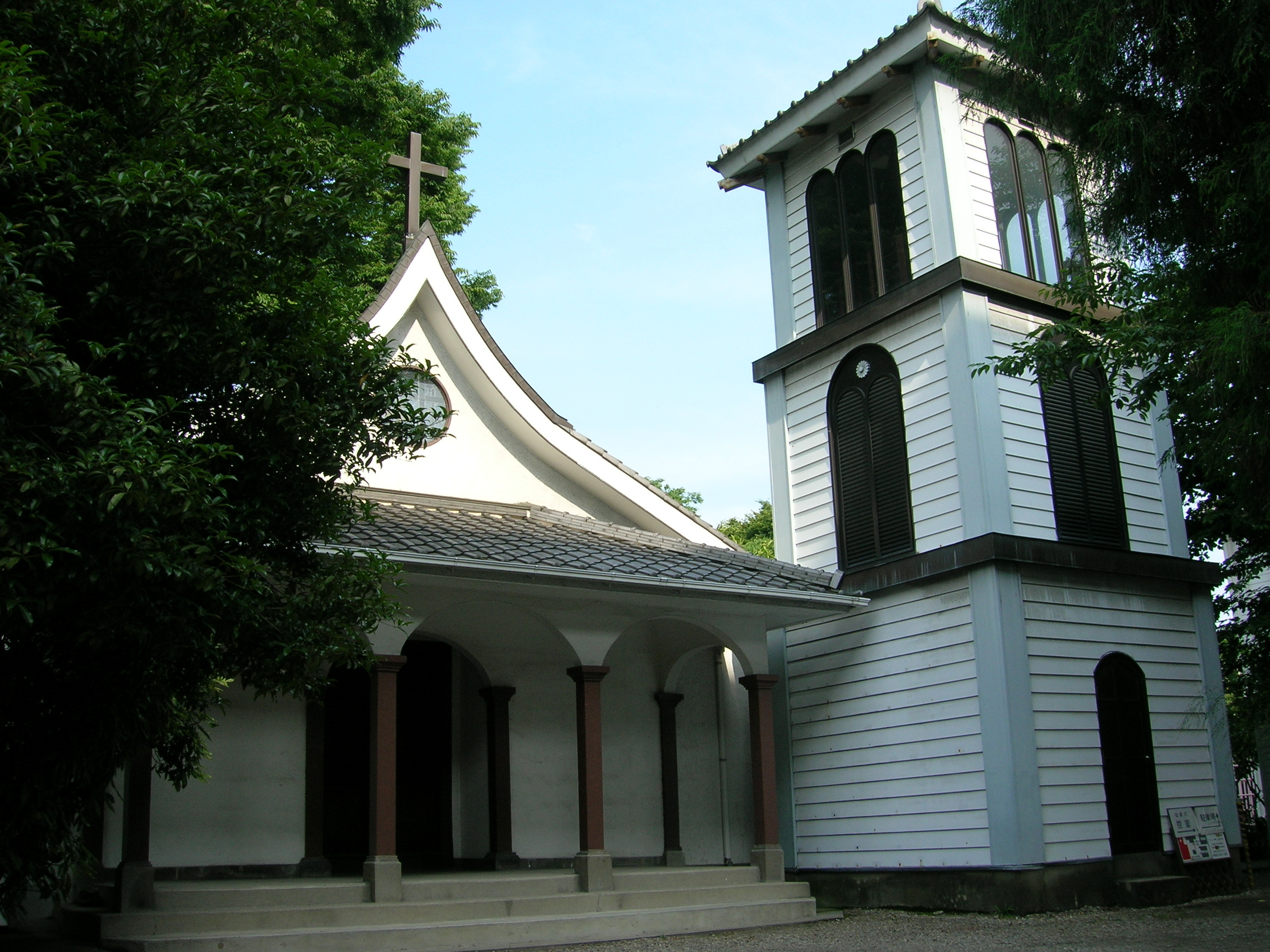
Catholic Chikaramachi Church

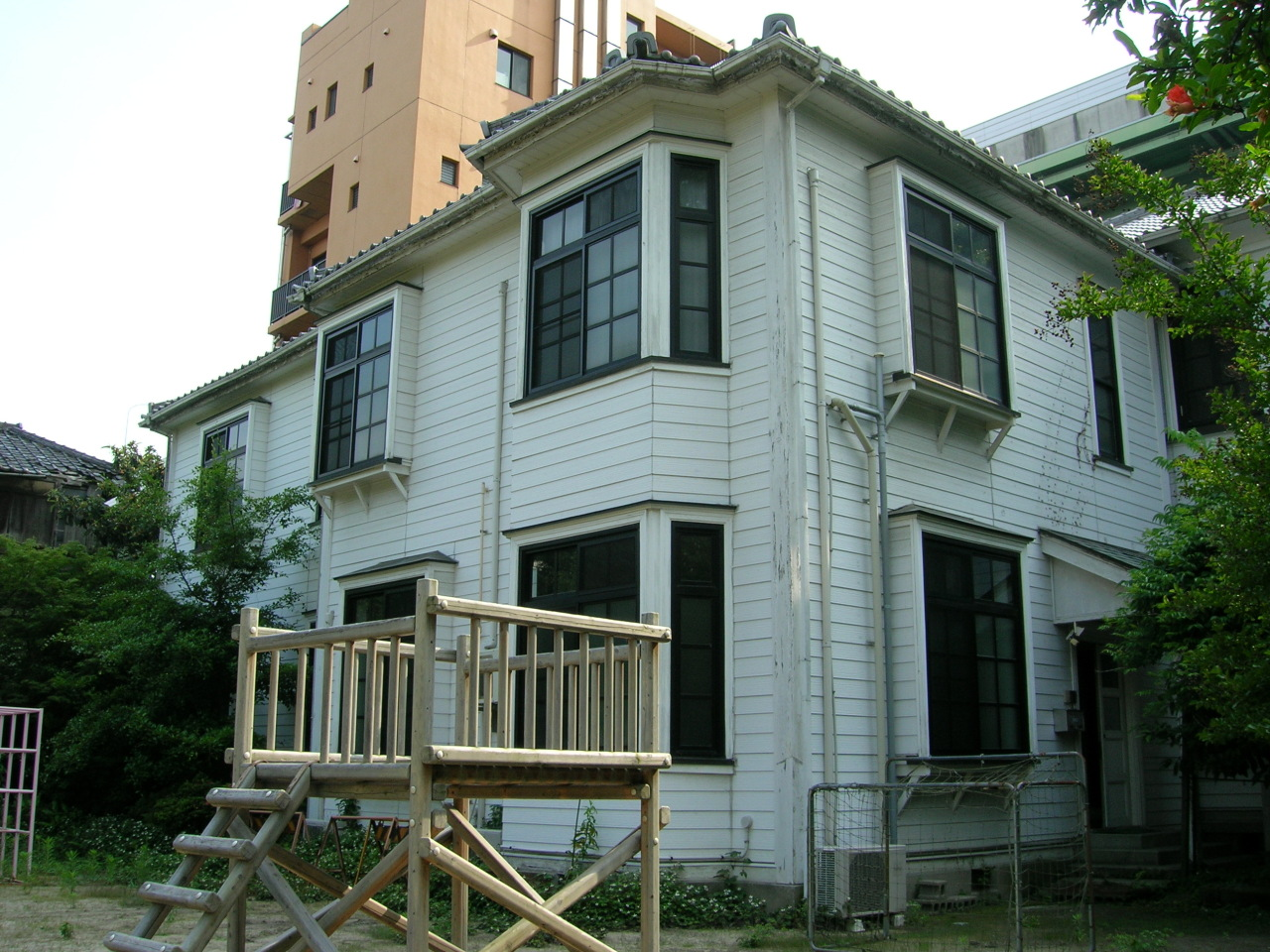
Presbytery of the church

The Catholic Chikaramachi Church (カトリック主税町教会) is one of the oldest Christian churches in the city of Nagoya, central Japan. The official name is Church of Our Lady (聖母教会).

== History ==
The church was established in 1888 by the French Catholic missionary Fr. Augustin Tulpin, thus making it the oldest church in Aichi. The present chapel was constructed in 1904 in a fusion of Western and Japanese architecture, and underwent various extensions and renovations since then. The presbytery was constructed in 1930.

It is constructed in a fusion of Western and Japanese architecture. The chapel was constructed in 1904; it is still in use after several renovations. As part of the Cultural Path of Nagoya, it is an important historic building of the city.
