= Nagoya City Archives =

Coordinates: 35°10′52.89″N 136°54′37.09″E

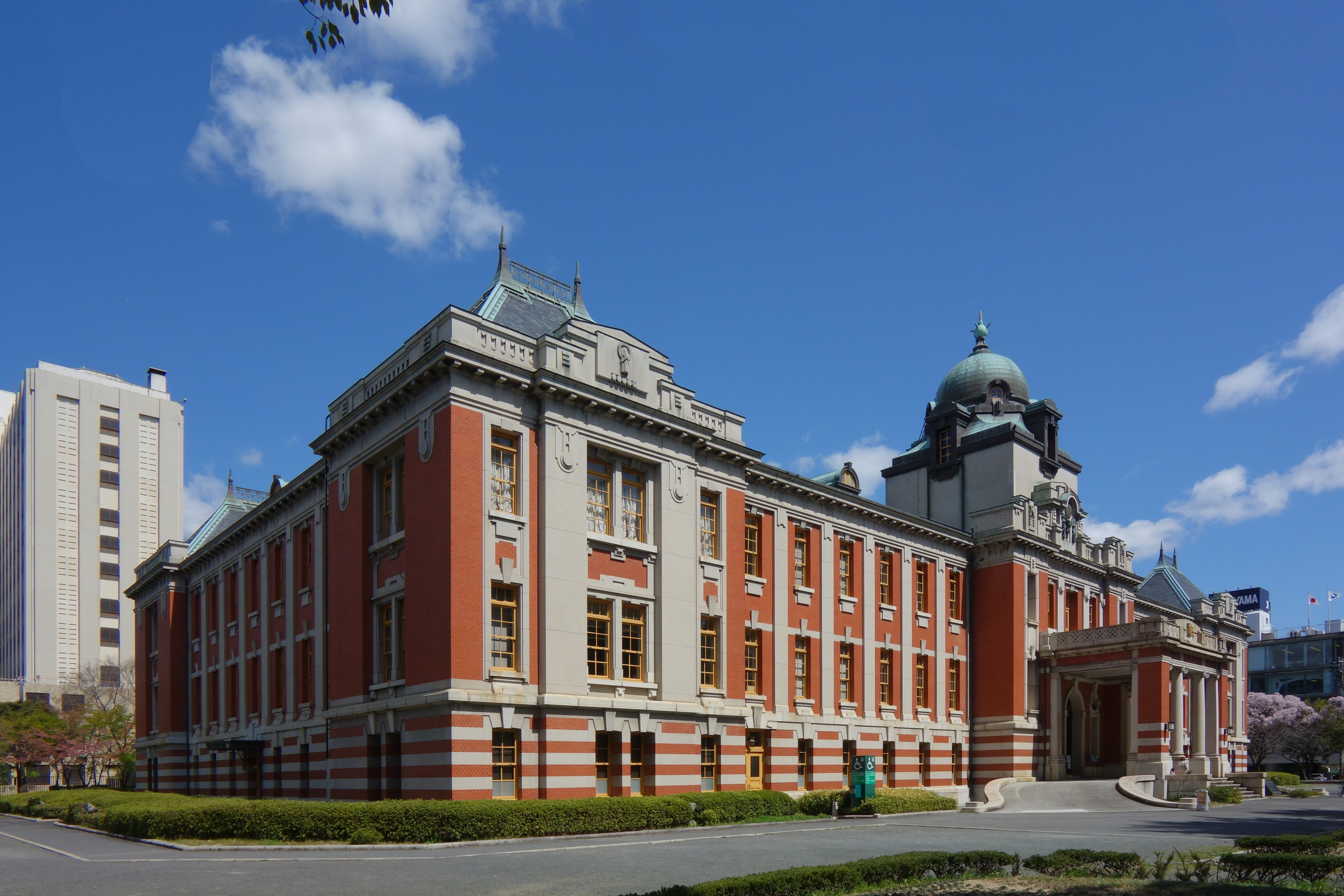
The Nagoya Court of Appeals building houses today the city archives

Nagoya City Archives (名古屋市市政資料館) is a historic building located in the city of Nagoya, central Japan.

It was constructed in 1922 during the Taishō era, when western influences in architecture were increasingly fashionable in Japan. It was originally built as the Nagoya Court of Appeals building. It is designated today as an Important Cultural Property.
