= Momosuke Fukuzawa =

Japanese businessman (1868–1938)

- 福澤 桃介
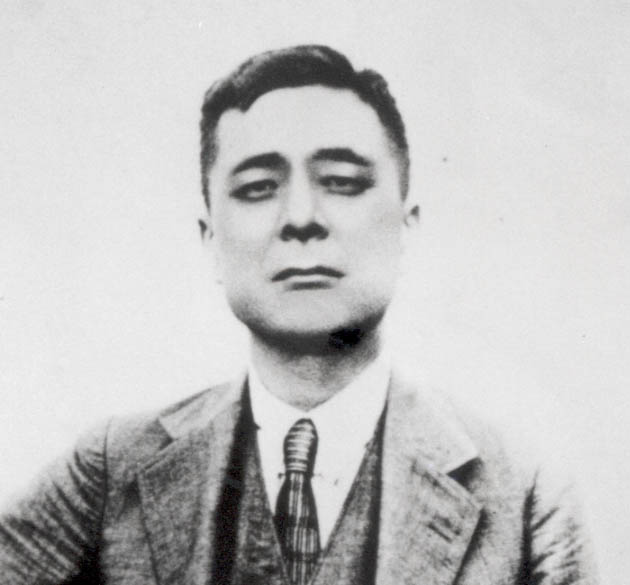
- Momosuke Fukuzawa
- Born: June 25, 1868; Kawagoe, Japan
- Died: February 2, 1938 (age 69); Tokyo, Japan
- Other name: Tōsuke Fukuzawa

Momosuke Fukuzawa (福澤 桃介 Fukuzawa Momosuke, June 25, 1868 – February 2, 1938) was a Japanese businessman nicknamed "The Wizard of the Money Markets" for his financial success and "The King of Electrical Power" for being the first Japanese to introduce hydroelectric power to the country. He formulated his ideology of 'ikkasen hitokaisha' (one river for one company).

== Early life ==
Momosuke Iwasaki was born in a small village near Kawagoe “where his family had been village elders and prosperous farmers for three hundred years.” His father Kiichi was the second son so he only inherited a few paddy fields. “Kiichi was a rather impractical, scholarly type, who much preferred sitting at home with his brush, perfecting his calligraphy, to breaking his back in the fields.” To support the family his mother Sada opened a shop but they “were frequently on the verge of bankruptcy.”

As Momosuke was finishing school, a neighbor, “a lower-ranking keeper of the town office,” noticed his academic abilities and told Kiichi to have Momosuke apply to Keio University, only recently founded. Also a second son, Momosuke's only other option would have been to help in the family fields. With the financial support of his father's elder brother Momosuke began his studies there.

== Education ==
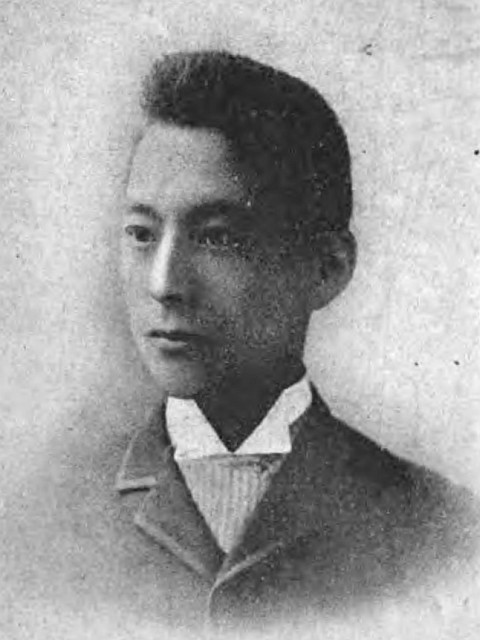
Momosuke Fukuzawa at a young age

While at Keio he became known as “the pretty boy from Kawagoe who is tougher than he looks,” for being able to fend off his samurai-born classmates despite his delicate features. While at Keio he formed relationships with Sadayakko, the most famous geisha in the city, and with the university's founder Yukichi Fukuzawa.

The latter came to admire Momosuke's abilities and, despite having sons of his own, desired to have him become his heir. On December 17, 1887, he sent Momosuke a formal marriage contract. Fukuzawa would sponsor Momosuke to study abroad for three years. In exchange Momosuke would marry Fukuzawa's second daughter Fusa and take on the Fukuzawa name.
