= Ritsuko Mori =

Japanese actress

- 森律子
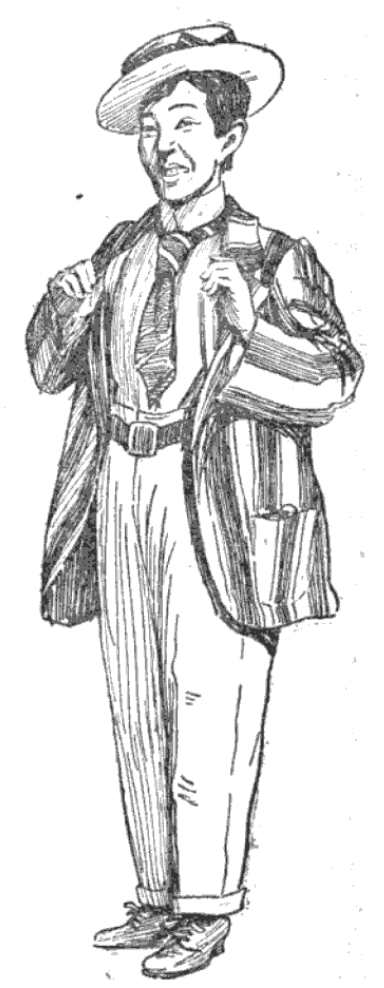
- Ritsuko Mori as sketched by Elizabeth Keith, from a 1918 publication
- Born: 30 October 1890; Tokyo
- Died: 22 July 1961
- Occupation: Actress

Ritsuko Mori (30 October 1890 – 22 July 1961) (森律子 in Japanese, or もり りつこ in kana) was a Japanese actress. As a woman from a respected family, her entry into the acting profession was considered disreputable, but her success improved the opportunities and social standing of professional actresses in Japan.

== Early life ==
Mori was born in Tokyo, the daughter of Hajime Mori, a lawyer and politician. She graduated from Atomi Girls' School. She was one of the first students trained as an actress with Sada Yacco, at the Imperial Training School for Actresses. She toured in Europe to study Western theatre in 1913.

== Career ==
Mori's choice of an acting career was considered a shocking embarrassment to her family and social circles. "All my relatives and friends were against it and even persecuted me," she explained in 1919. Her success improved the social standing of Japanese women working in the theatre. She was inspired by many performers who went before her, including male Peking opera star Mei Lanfang.

Mori appeared in stage comedies, dramas, kabuki, and operettas. In 1916, she played a blind heroine character in a one-act tragedy, Mitsu-no-Kokoro, at the Imperial Theatre. A Western reviewer described her "interesting" performance in a breeches role in 1918, saying Mori "gets full play for her vivacity and skill." Also in 1918, she played Portia in an adaptation of Shakespeare's The Merchant of Venice by Yuzo Tsubouchi. In 1919 she gave a eulogy speech at the funeral of her colleague, actress Sumako Matsui; "Why must you leave us, the actresses of Japan, struggling hard for the perfection of woman's part upon the stage, new to the Japanese public and most difficult for us?"

Mori was "the leading lady of the Imperial Theatre" and helped with managing the theatre's productions in the 1920s, according to American journalist Marguerite Harrison. She officially welcomed Irish tenor John McCormack on his arrival in Tokyo in 1926. In the 1930s she worked with actor Shotaro Hanayagi.

== Personal life ==
She adopted her niece, actress Kakuko Mori. She died in 1961, at the age of 70.
