= Sada Yacco =

Japanese actress

- 川上 貞奴
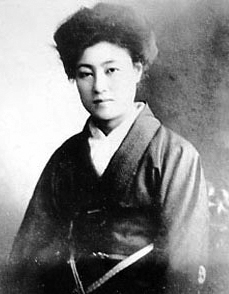
- Born: Sadayakko Kawakami; 18 July 1871; Tokyo, Japan
- Died: 7 November 1946 (aged 75)
- Other name: 川上 貞奴
- Occupations: Geisha, actress, dancer
- Spouse: Otojirō Kawakami

Sada Yacco or Sadayakko (川上 貞奴, Kawakami Sadayakko; Japanese pronunciation: [ka.wa.ka.mʲi (|) sa.da.jaꜜk.ko], July 18, 1871 – December 7, 1946) was a Japanese geisha, actress and dancer.

== Early life ==
Sadayakko Kawakami was born July 18, 1871, the youngest of twelve children. "My grandfather on my mother's side was an assistant magistrate and rather famous, I hear. Our house was in Nihonbashi, right where the Bank of Japan is now." "For generations her family had run the Echizen-ya, a large store that incorporated a currency exchange and a bookshop."

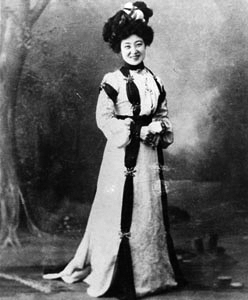
Sada Yacco in stage dress

According to Leslie Downer's biography of her, "Sada's mother, Otaka [Koguma], was a notable beauty. In her youth she had worked for a time in the mansion of a daimyō, a provincial lord. There she acquired airs and graces and an aristocratic style. Sada's father, Hisajiro Koyama, was such a placid, saintly man that he was nicknamed 'Buddha.' When he married Otaka, he moved into the family house and eventually inherited the business."

The many industrialization projects undertaken by the Meiji government would be financed by heavy taxes and caused soaring inflation, leading the Koyamas and many other families to lose their finances. To help make ends meet the family set up a pawnbroking business. When Sada was four years old, she was sent to work as a maid at the Hamada okiya in the Yoshichō district of Tokyo. Three years later, Hisajiro died, leading the Hamada's proprietress Kamekichi to adopt Sada as her heir.

"In the winter of 1883, at the age of twelve, the child celebrated her debut as an o-shaku, literally 'a sake pourer,' an apprentice geisha. She also received her first geisha name. From now on she was to be Ko-yakko or Little Yakko, named after a geisha named Yakko who had been one of the most adored in Tokyo. Kamekichi felt sure that Little Yakko would grow up to be as brilliant a star in her turn."

== Career as a geisha ==
To make sure that Koyakko's career would blossom, Kamekichi sent her to a Shinto priest to learn how to read and write. This was revolutionary for several reasons. Women's education in Japan was only just starting—the first women's school (for noblewomen only) did not open until 1870. "Geisha were expected to be modern, trendsetting women, but such a skill put Sada ahead of the crowd", many geisha and other entertainers being illiterate and, despite their popularity, members of the lower classes.

Koyakko also took secret lessons in judo, and learned how to ride horses and play billiards. "A few years later, as the gossip columnists of the day reported with great excitement, she even took part in professional races. It was another mark of how unconventional and progressive she was." It was on one of these horse rides that she met Momosuke Fukuzawa, then a student at Keio University. She would sustain a short friendship with him that would not be revived again until the 20th century.

In 1886, when Koyakko was fifteen, her mizuage was sold to then-Prime Minister Itō Hirobumi. Her coming-of-age led her to adopt the new name of Yakko, and the prestige of her new patron greatly increased her popularity at the teahouses.

"She had also discovered a new talent: acting." As Downer explains, "from 1629, in an attempt to maintain order, kabuki was restricted to male actors. Women performers went underground. The entertainers of the pleasure quarters, who later became known as geisha, performed music and dance of the same genre as kabuki, including dance solos from kabuki plays, but only for private, exclusive customers. So it was a short step for a geisha to act [...] Yakko discovered that she much preferred taking the exciting male parts, with plenty of dramatic posing and fighting scenes, rather than playing coy women's parts."

"After three years [1888] the Prime Minister released Yakko from being his mistress, though he remained her friend and advisor." Instead, by 1891 she was "enjoying the favors" of two patrons and two lovers simultaneously, hoping like many geisha to find a secure position in society via a reliable patron or husband.

"That year everyone was talking about a flamboyant young man who called himself the Liberty Kid. Along with his troupe he performed seditious political dramas, which had been thrilling audiences in Osaka, Kyoto, and beyond, throughout western Japan. His trademark was a catchy satirical song he had composed, which was a huge hit. Now the troupe were on their way to Tokyo. Their first appearances at the prestigious Nakamura-za Theater were heavily booked before they had even arrived in the city." This Liberty Kid, twenty-seven-year-old Otojiro Kawakami, had a "cheeky round face, thick eyebrows, a blunt nose, and a defiant set to his mouth. He looked like an overgrown street urchin spoiling for a fight. His cocky self-confidence, combined with a certain self-depracatingly comical style, was irrestible."

The troupe's popularity was such that Prime Minister Ito commanded a private performance at the Kiraku teahouse, where he had also invited Yakko and four other Yoshichō geisha. Otojiro's troupe friend and fellow womanizer Asajiro Fujisawa would later say that Yakko became instantly drawn to his strong will and authority. "Yakko saw his power and realized what a strong man he was [...] She thought, I'd like to be with someone this powerful for the rest of my life. [...] But she had her pride. She decided she would have to make Kawakami a man. Otherwise she would lose face" Abandoning her other men, Yakko devoted herself entirely to Otojiro, continuing to work at parties as a geisha to support him and "keep herself busy." Finally, in October 1893, Yakko and Otojiro were married, with a mutual friend Baron Kentaro Kaneko as the official go-between.

== Career as an actress ==
Despite Otojiro's ability to cater to the Japanese public, he was notoriously hopeless with money and was constantly in trouble with creditors. After three years of ups-and-downs, from short-lived productions and asset seizures to a failed political campaign in 1897, to near-divorce in 1896 after the discovery of Otojiro's illegitimate son Raikichi by a courtesan, Otojiro and Yakko attempted to escape their financial problems via boat to Kobe.

On January 2, 1899, the pair arrived and met Yumindo Kushibiki, a businessman who had made his fortune building a Japanese tea garden in Atlantic City, New Jersey, and bringing Japanese entertainment and goods to the United States. Kushibiki, desiring to add authentic theater to his garden's repertoire, offered to sponsor and promote Otojiro's troupe on a continental tour. Otojiro accepted the offer and gathered a total of eighteen people for his troupe: nine other male actors, two child actors (his fourteen-year-old brother Isojiro and his eleven-year-old niece Tsuru), a costume master, a props man, hairdresser, singer, shamisen player, bag carrier, and his wife Yakko. Yakko later said she intended to go only as Otojiro's wife, although she practiced some of her performances learned as a geisha should she have to appear onstage.

Setting sail on April 30 that year, the troupe arrived three weeks later in San Francisco, where, unbeknownst to Yakko, Kushibiki had promoted her as the starlet of the troupe, the Japanese equivalent of famed actresses like Sarah Bernhardt. "If they were to perform before Americans, they would need a beautiful actress as the star," he reasoned. She was given the stage name "Sadayakko", and debuted May 25, "perform[ing]the death scene from The Maiden at Dōjō-ji Temple (Musume Dōjō-ji), which she had practiced in Kobe 'so skillfully that there was a storm of applause.'"

This dance (buyō) wowed audiences almost immediately – "the San Francisco Examiner hailed the couple as 'the Henry Irving and Ellen Terry of Japan' [...] Yakko's debut had been a triumph. Her dancing lessons since the age of four, her years as a geisha, which was a form of acting in itself, her appearances on the stage in charity performances, had all paid off. Even Otojiro must have recognized that this was no humble little woman. She was the entrancing Yakko, the most celebrated geisha in Japan, adored by prime ministers, sumo heroes, and kabuki stars. She could bewitch anyone – even a theaterful of Westerners who could not understand a word she said."

=== First tour schedule ===
==== United States ====
June to November 6, 1899:

- Turn Verein Hall, San Francisco (two weeks)
- California Theater, San Francisco (June 18 to 21)
- German Hall, San Francisco (July 21 to 28)
- two theaters in Seattle, one being the Seattle Theater (September 9 to mid-September)
- a theater in Tacoma, Washington (one week)
- a theater in Portland, Oregon (until October 7)
- the Lyric Theatre and Chicago Auditorium (two weeks, from October 22 to November 6)

November 6 to early December, 1899:

- a theater in Grand Rapids, Michigan
- a theater in Muskegon, Michigan
- the Hamblyn Theater in Battle Creek, Michigan
- the Colossal Theater in Adrian, Michigan
- the Noble Opera House in Tiffin, Ohio
- the Palatine Theater in Toledo
- the Victoria Theater in Dayton
- theaters in Mansfield, New York, Bucryus, New York, and Albany, New York

Early December to January 28, 1900:

- the Tremont Theater in Boston
- Copley Hall in Boston

January 28 to April, 1900:

- the Lafayette Square Opera House in Washington, D.C. (January 29 to February 8)
- the Berkeley Lyceum in New York, New York (ten days)
- the Bijou Theatre on Broadway (till April)

==== Europe ====
"'They begged us to stay longer in America,' Otojiro began his diary entry for Saturday, April 28. 'But as we had Henry Irving's letter of introduction, I wanted to set foot on European soil immediately. Regretfully we left New York, looking back fondly, and set off across the Atlantic.'"

May 22 to June 28, 1900:

- the Coronet Theatre, Notting Hill Gate in London, England
- the Bute House in London

July 4, 1900, to June 16, 1901; June 16 to November 3, 1901:

- the theater of Loie Fuller at the 1900 Exposition Universelle in Paris

November 4–5, 1901:

- the Japanese embassy in Brussels
- a park in front of the Belgian Royal Palace

After sailing back to London on November 7 and boarding a steamer, "finally, at eight o'clock on the morning of Monday, January 1, 1901, after a voyage of nearly two months, more than a year and a half after they had left Japan, they dropped anchor in Kobe."

=== Second tour schedule ===
"On April 10, Otojiro and Yakko boarded the luxury six-thousand-ton Sanuki-maru with their new troupe. There were now twenty actors plus Raikichi", including five women (a former member of an all-female acting troupe, Yakko's niece Tsuru Koyama, Kamekichi's relative Tane Hamada, and two other geisha), "along with musicians, dressers and hairdressers. A theatre critic named Tohi Shunsho accompanied them, intending to spend his time studying and researching foreign drama. They stopped in Singapore, Penang, and Colombo, steamed across the Red Sea and the Mediterranean, and stopped over at Marseille. At 6:00 AM on June 4 they dropped anchor at Tilbury Docks at the mouth of the Thames, on the edge of London."

June 18 to the end of August, 1901:

- the Criterion Theatre in Piccadilly Circus, (18 June to 13 July), transferring to the Shaftesbury Theatre (16 July to 7 August). The American serpentine dancer Loie Fuller danced between the plays at the Criterion. In London the company performed The Geisha and the Knight (42 performances), Kesa (17 perfs), Zingoro (36 perfs) and The Shogun: A Tale of Old Japan (12 perfs).
- the 1901 International Exhibition in Glasgow, Scotland

Late August to November 8, 1901:

- the Theatre de l'Athenee, Paris

In addition to their previous Paris repertoire – The Geisha and the Knight, Kesa, Takanori and Zingoro – the troupe also performed Otojiro's version of The Merchant of Venice, a historical drama called The Shogun and Kosan and Kinkoro, "a Japanese La Dame aux Camelias."

Mid-November to late January 1902:

- Berlin
- Hanover
- Bremen
- Hamburg
- Leipzig
- the Royal Opera House in Dresden
- Saturday, 18.01.1902: Frankfurt, Opernhaus
- Sunday, 19.01.1902: Baden-Baden, Theater in Baden
- Monday, 20.01.1902: Strasbourg, Stadt-Theater
- Tuesday, 21.01.1902: Mainz, Stadt-Theater
- Wednesday, 22.01.1902: Karlsruhe, Großherzogliches Hoftheater
- Thursday, 23.01.1902: Mannheim, Saalbau-Theater
- Friday, 24.01.1902: Mannheim, Saalbau-Theater
- Saturday, 25.01.1902: Basel, Stadt-Theater
- Sunday, 26.01.1902: Zurich, Stadt-Theater
- Monday, 27.01.1902: Stuttgart, Residenz-Theater
- Tuesday, 28.01.1902: Munich, Kgl. Residenz-Theater

February 1 to mid-March, 1902:

- Vienna, Theater an der Wien
- Prague
- Budapest
- Bucharest
- Kraków
- Saint Petersburg
- Moscow, including a performance at the Winter Palace of Czar Nicholas II

Mid-March to late April, 1902:

- Rome
- Naples
- Florence, including the Teatro della Pergola
- Livorno
- Genoa
- Turin
- Milan
- Venice

May 1902 to July 4, 1902:

- Barcelona
- Madrid
- Portugal
- Toulouse
- Marseille
- Lyon
- Antwerp
- Brussels
- London

"After a six-week journey, on August 19th, 1902, the Awa-maru docked at Kobe. The epic journey was over. It was time to come back to earth."

=== Imperial Actress Training School ===
After supporting and acting with the Kawakami troupe for several years and going with them to study in Paris, Yakko became inspired to form her own acting school for women. In her own words, "having seen how actresses there are highly educated and well read, and how society welcomes them and heartily supports their development, I [...] would like to train accomplished actresses, who might come to be called the Sarah Bernhardts of Japan."

Otojiro established the Imperial Theater Company Limited to provide five hundred yen capital plus one hundred yen a month to fund the school. Five prominent local businessmen became "founding members"—entrepreneur Eiichi Shibusawa, industrial magnate Kihachiro Okura, financiers Tsunenori Tanaka and Taro Masuda, and the "Wizard of the Money Markets", Momosuke Fukuzawa.

"Applicants were to be aged between sixteen and twenty-five, educated to at least junior-high-school level, and with two guarantors who were Tokyo homeowners. The curriculum would include history, script writing, traditional and modern acting skills, and Japanese and Western dancing, as well as the playing of musical instruments such as the flute, shoulder drum, shamisen, and koto. The course would last for two years. There were no fees but students would be expected to perform at the Imperial Theater as part of their practical training. Anyone who left without completing the two years would be charged for the tuition they had received. If they then took up acting or used their training to practice as geisha, they would be fined."

Out of over 100 applicants, Sadayakko interviewed and eventually selected fifteen students, including Ritsuko Mori, daughter of an upper-class politician. The grand opening took place on September 15, 1908, "less than four months after she had returned from Paris."

== Later years ==
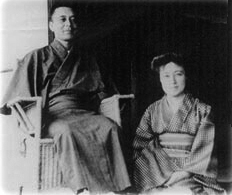
Sadayakko with Momosuke Fukuzawa

Perhaps as soon as April 1912, less than a year after Otojiro's death, Yakko rekindled her relationship with the (married) businessman Momosuke Fukuzawa. "In the terrible days and months following Otojiro's death, Yakko was desperately in need of support and love. As for Momosuke, he had been consoling himself in the company of geisha for more years than he cared to remember. Neither had ever forgotten the intensity of their first meeting as children. Their friendship as adults was touched with the magic of that innocent love. It had never soured. They had been wrenched apart in spite of themselves."

Although it was not uncommon for married men to seek out and maintain mistresses, this was usually done in secret. For Momosuke and Yakko to live and travel together so openly, then, and to even dare to flirt with each other in public (in a time when kissing or even nearly kissing was considered "shockingly erotic [...] still strictly reserved for the bedroom"), would stir a large public scandal. "Apart from anything else, geisha knew that their job was to take the pressure off a man's marriage. The geisha code was never to try and tear a man away from his wife [...] It was Yakko, not Momosuke, who risked disgrace. Even if she chose not live out her days as a nun, she ought to have married—not taken someone else's husband. By opting for love she forfeited respectability."

Despite the criticism they received for their relationship, she and Momosuke supported one another's continuing careers, she now starring in roles of her own choosing (such as Tosca and Salome) and Momosuke embarking on several business ventures.

Finally, in September 1917 Yakko announced her retirement, her last performance being the lead in Aida. The home she and Momosuke would build together in Futaba (now part of Nagoya) was restored and moved to Shumoku-cho in Higashi Ward and is now the Cultural Path Futaba Museum. She built two homes in Tokyo, the House of Peach Water a few blocks from the Imperial Palace (which she would sell in the late 1920s) and a "luxurious residence built in Kawada-cho, an exclusive Millionaires' Row in the north of Tokyo."

Although retired from acting, Sada (having given up her stage and geisha names) involved herself in establishing the Kawakami Silk Company, a textile business near their home that would last until she closed it following the Great Kantō earthquake in 1923. In December 1924 she also established the Kawakami Children's Music and Drama School in Tokyo, eventually closing it soon after Momosuke retired in 1928.

In 1933, the pair decided that, Momosuke now being sixty-five and in poor health, he should move back to his house and wife in Shibuya and end their relationship. "They held a solemn ceremony to mark the end of an era. They had been together more than twenty years. Sada had never hoped for or expected so much happiness in the second half of her life."

For her part, Sada decided to sell their home in Futaba and use the proceeds to build a temple, Teishoji, next to the River Kiso, tei being written with the same characters as her name (meaning "chastity"/"constancy") and sho meaning "to shine." She dedicated the temple to Fudo Myo-o, her guardian deity, and built a storehouse on its grounds to house costumes, personal effects, and other important mementos from her life. Nearby she would build a large villa named Bansho'en (the Garden of Evening Pines) after a villa she had lived in with Otojiro following their tours.

== Death ==
"Sada's life [now] revolved around her three homes: Kawado-cho in Tokyo", which would unfortunately burn in the city's fire bombing during World War II, "the Garden of Evening Pines, and a small villa in the hilly, semitropical seaside spa resort of Atami, where she went in winter to take the health-giving, mineral-rich waters".

Soon after Japan surrendered, Sada discovered that she had cancer of the liver, which had spread to her throat and tongue. Her adopted daughter Tomiji, and granddaughter, Hatsu, came to Atami to take care of her, "sitting by her bedside, moistening her lips with cotton wool dipped in water" as Sada was soon unable to eat or drink.

She died on December 7, 1946, aged 75. Her last words were to Tomiji, "I'll watch over you." Three years later, her bones were interred at Teishoji, in a tomb she had previously set aside "in a secluded hollow in the hillside behind the main building, shaded by groves of maple and bamboo."

== See also ==
- List of dancers
- Tsukitani Hatsuko, contemporary ceramic artist who also lived in Nagoya
