= Kushibiki Yumindo =

Japanese impresario

- 櫛引弓人
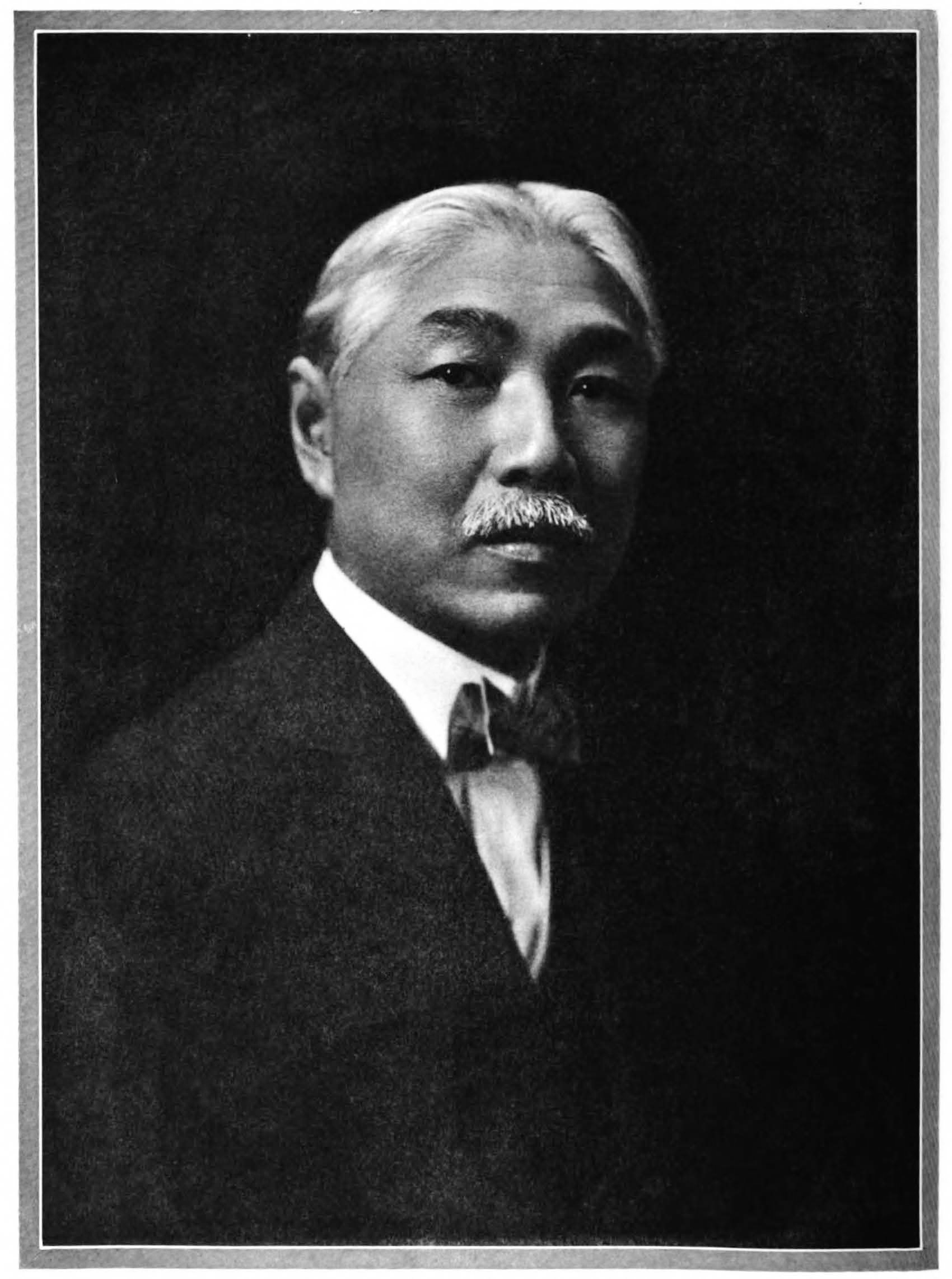
- Kushibiki Yumindo circa 1915
- Born: 1859 or 1865; Gonohe, Aomori
- Died: July 28, 1924
- Other names: Yumeto, Yumeto, Yumeno
- Occupations: exhibition organizer, impresario
- Years active: 1890s-1910s

Kushibiki Yumindo (櫛引弓人; 1859/1865 – July 28, 1924), also given as Yumeto, Yumito, and Yumeno, was a Japanese impresario responsible for organizing many international exhibitions in the late 19th and early 20th centuries.

== The Japanese Exhibition King ==
Kushibiki Yumindo was born in the town of Gonohe, Aomori, either in 1859, as most Japanese sources claim, or 1865, as he stated on several occasions while in the United States. Little is known of his early life. A brief Japanese biography from the Aomori Prefectural Library states that he went to Tokyo with the intention of entering Keio Gijuku but was unsuccessful. According to a 1916 profile in California's Magazine, he "came first to America in 1884." The beginnings of his entrepreneurial career are similarly undocumented. According to the 1916 profile, "At the Columbian Exposition at Chicago in 1893 he presented his first conception of an exploitation of Japan on the Midway, which proved highly successful, both as an instructive and popular exhibition and as a financial venture." Kushibiki's name does not, in fact, appear among the main organizers of that exposition, but within a few years he would become known as the "Japanese Exposition King."

Kushibiki's success owed much to his collaboration with another Japanese organizer at the Columbian Expo, Arai Saburō (1867-1951). In subsequent years, "Kushibiki and Arai organized Japanese villages and tea gardens at the Atlanta Cotton States Exposition (1895), Atlantic City (1896-1900), the Buffalo Pan-American Exposition (1901), the South Carolina Inter-State and West Indian Exposition at Charleston (1902), Coney Island’s Luna Park (opened May 1903), the Louisiana Purchase Exposition at St. Louis (1904), the Alaska–Yukon–Pacific Exposition in Seattle (1909) and the Panama–California Exposition at San Diego’s Balboa Park (1915)," along with the San Francisco Panama–Pacific International Exposition (1915) and Japan–British Exhibition (1910).

== Chicago, Atlanta, Nashville, Omaha ==
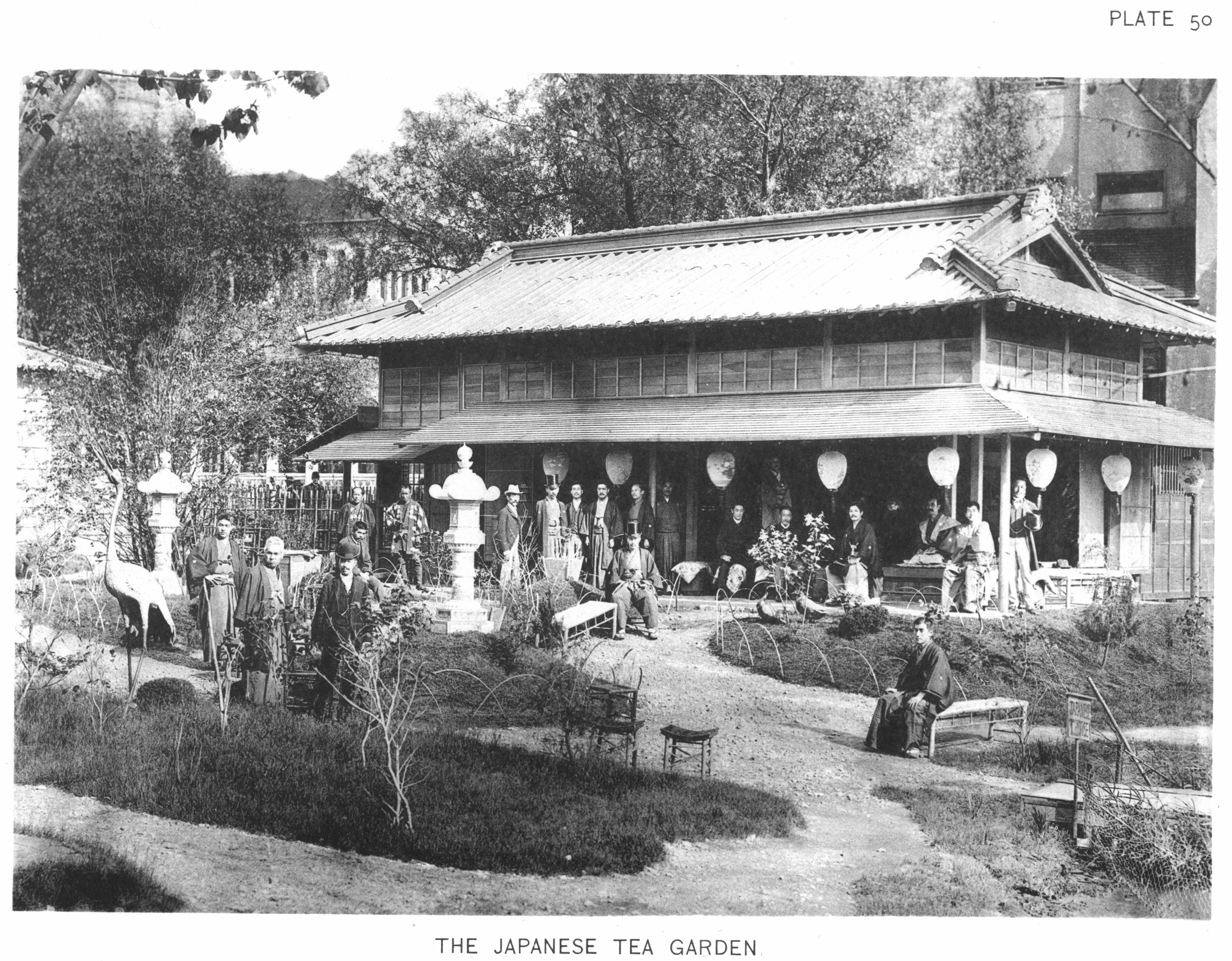
Chicago (1893)

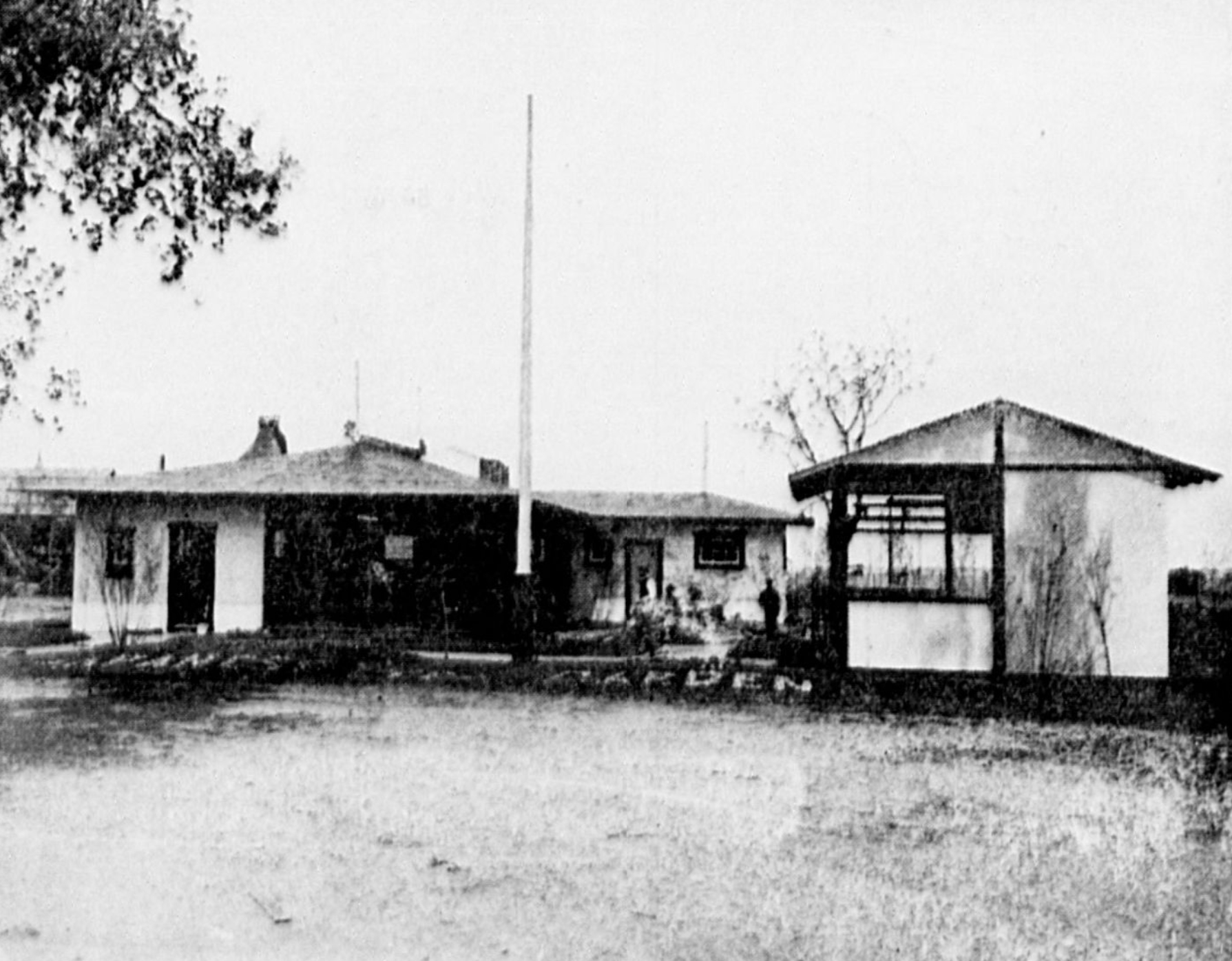
Omaha (1898)

Aside from the names and dates of expositions in which they participated, there are few descriptions of what sorts of work Kushibiki and Arai actually did at the expositions they organized, but it can be surmised that they operated as independent entrepreneurial managers or contractors in a style somewhat reminiscent of Professor Risley and his so-called Imperial Japanese Troupe, or Tannaker Buhicrosan's Japanese Village at Knightsbridge, London. Kushibiki worked well with both American and Japanese associates, with excellent collaboration skills and little need for recognition. It was five years before they received any attention in the American press, but five years after that, Kushibiki was declared "undisputedly the best Japanese showman in America."

For the Atlanta Cotton States and International Exposition, September to December 1895, Japanese commissioner M. Fujisawa requested and received a place off the Midway for a "high class" attraction. Japan was winning the Sino-Japanese War and hoped for international recognition. But the stratagem failed. "The Japanese Village, though located in another part of the park, may be considered a part of the anthropological display of the Midway group," wrote a local historian.

Although the Japanese exhibits at the 1897 Tennessee Centennial and International Exposition at Nashville were omitted from its official guidebook, they were at least spared the indignity of the racist depiction of the Chinese Village with its "queer creatures that are almost savages" and theater of "crude acting and dancing."

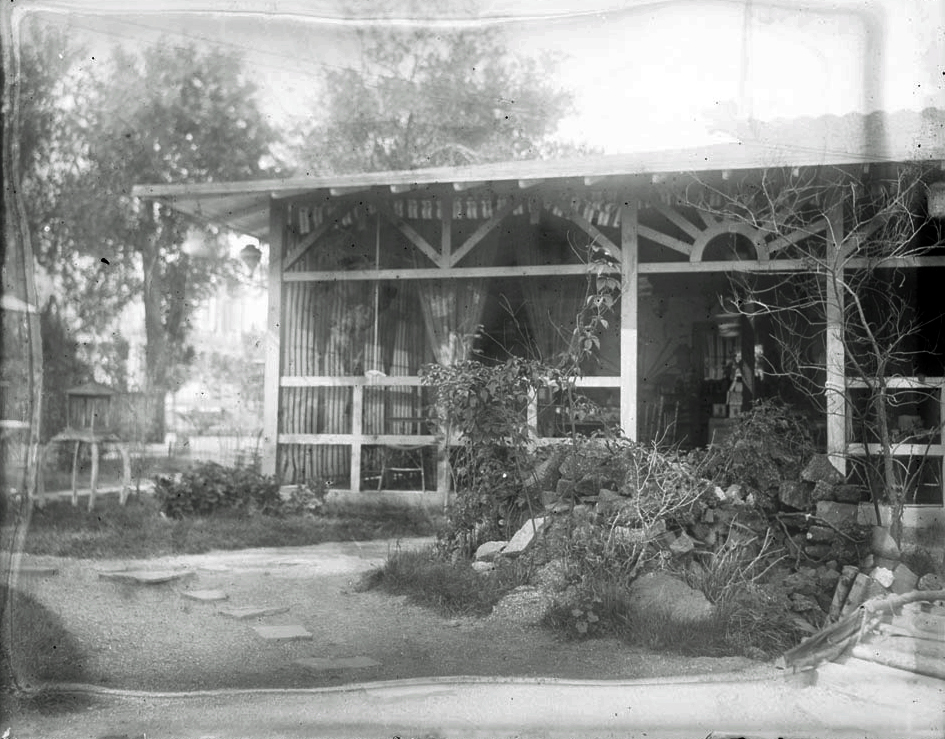
Japanese Tea Garden, Omaha Exposition 1898

Kushibiki did not participate in the Omaha Exposition in 1898; a concession for a Japanese Tea Garden on the Midway was granted to T. Mizutany, representative for a Japanese tea association.

== Atlantic City, gardens, nurseries, and landscaping ==
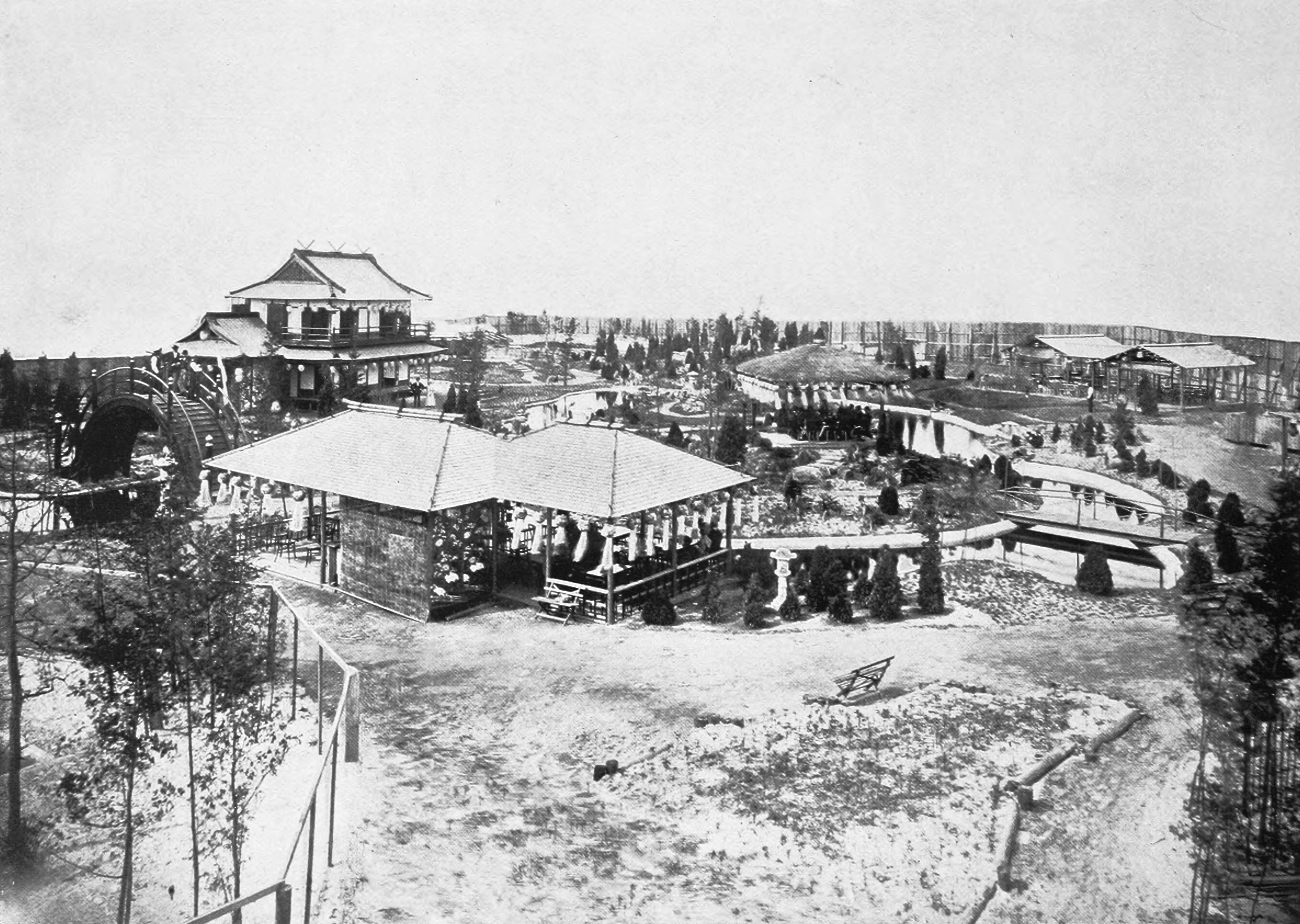
Atlantic City (1896)

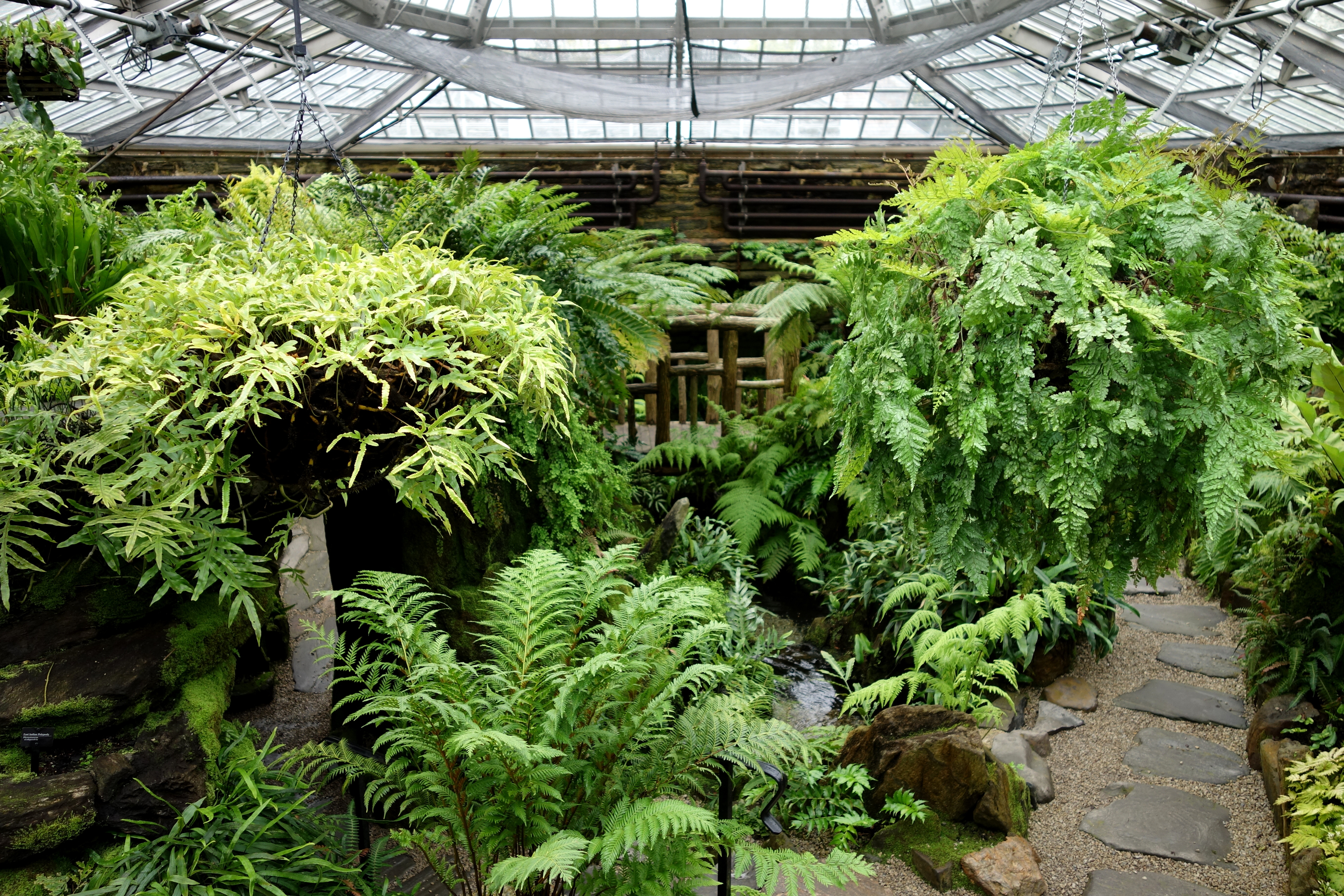
Morris Arboretum

In addition to their exposition work during this period, Kushibiki and Arai also ran a Japanese tea garden and nursery in Atlantic City.

And they took on private landscaping commissions. In 1899 they were hired to construct a fernery (now part of the Morris Arboretum) for wealthy Philadelphia siblings John and Lydia Morris. "To create the distinctive subterranean grotto ambiance, Morris hired Japanese garden makers Kushibiki and Arai to arrange one hundred tons of local Wissahickon schist into rockery formations resembling a cave or mountain cliff accented by delicate waterfalls, a flowing stream bed, and a goldfish pond. Once the plants took hold on the rocky surfaces, entering the fernery felt like a journey through a personal terrarium." The garden contained "about one thousand ferns, representing 523 different varieties," and was considered "one of the finest displays of filmy ferns (Hymenophyllaceae) in cultivation."

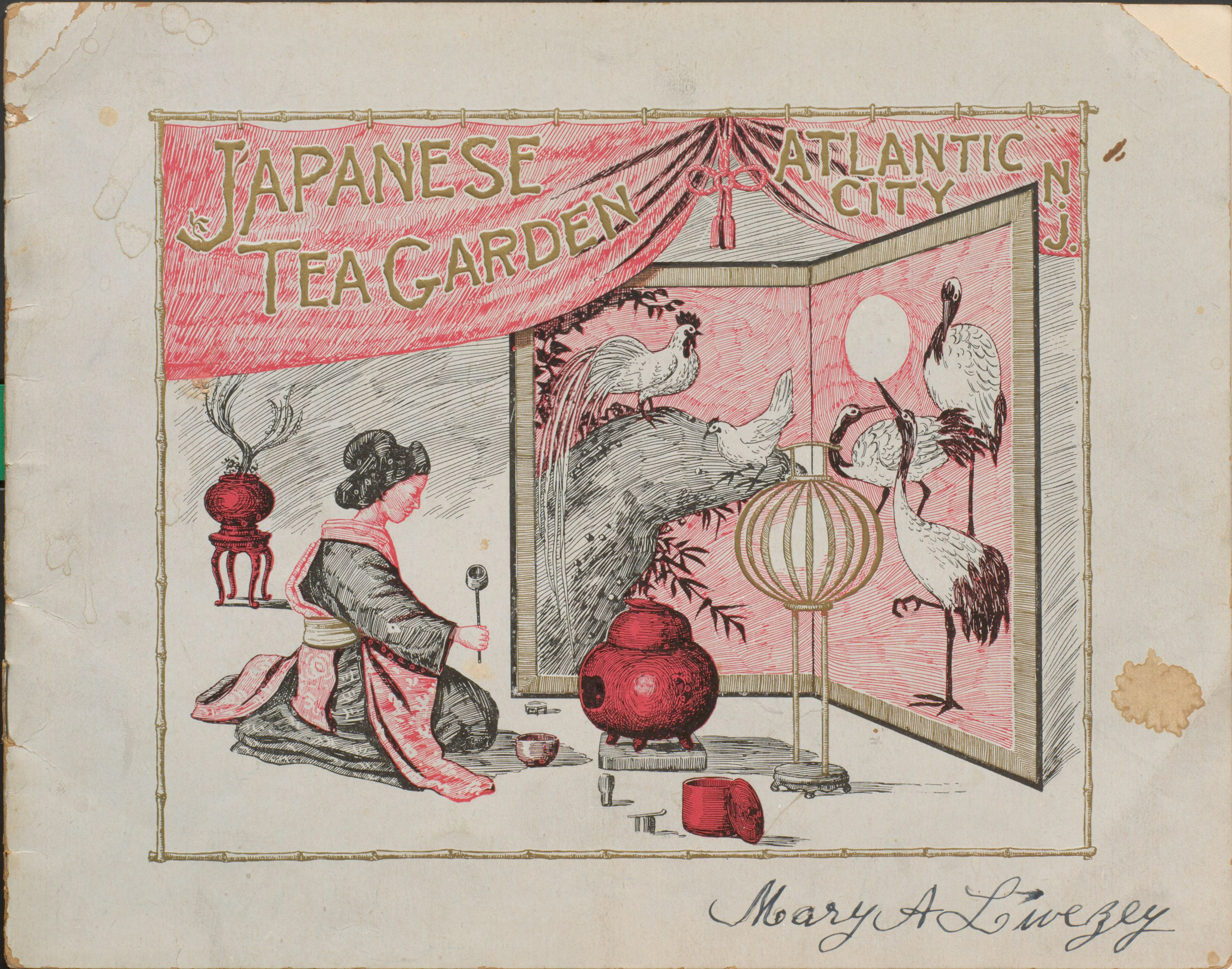
Japanese Tea Garden Atlantic City, N.J Booklet

Japanese Tea Garden Atlantic City, N.J

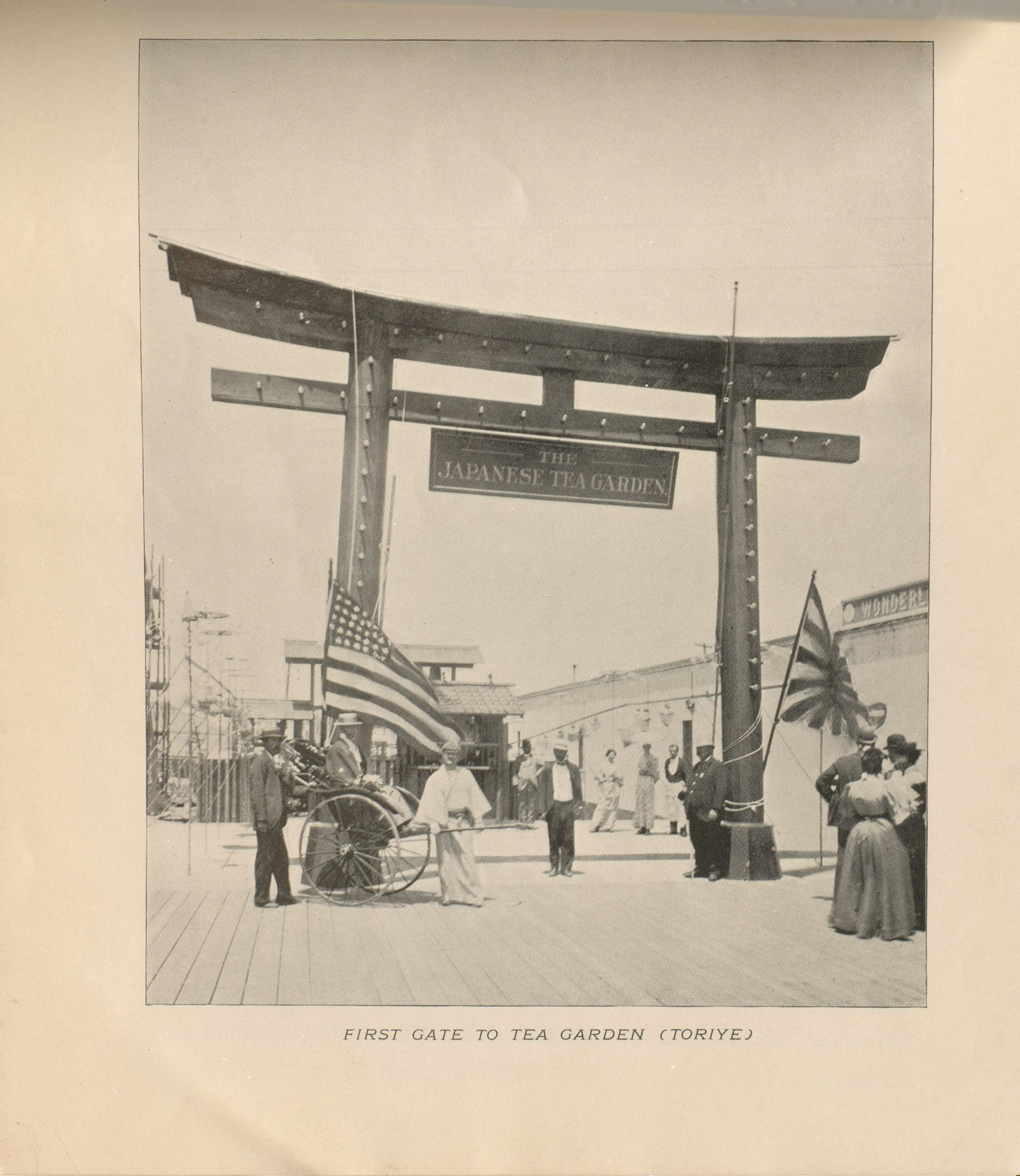

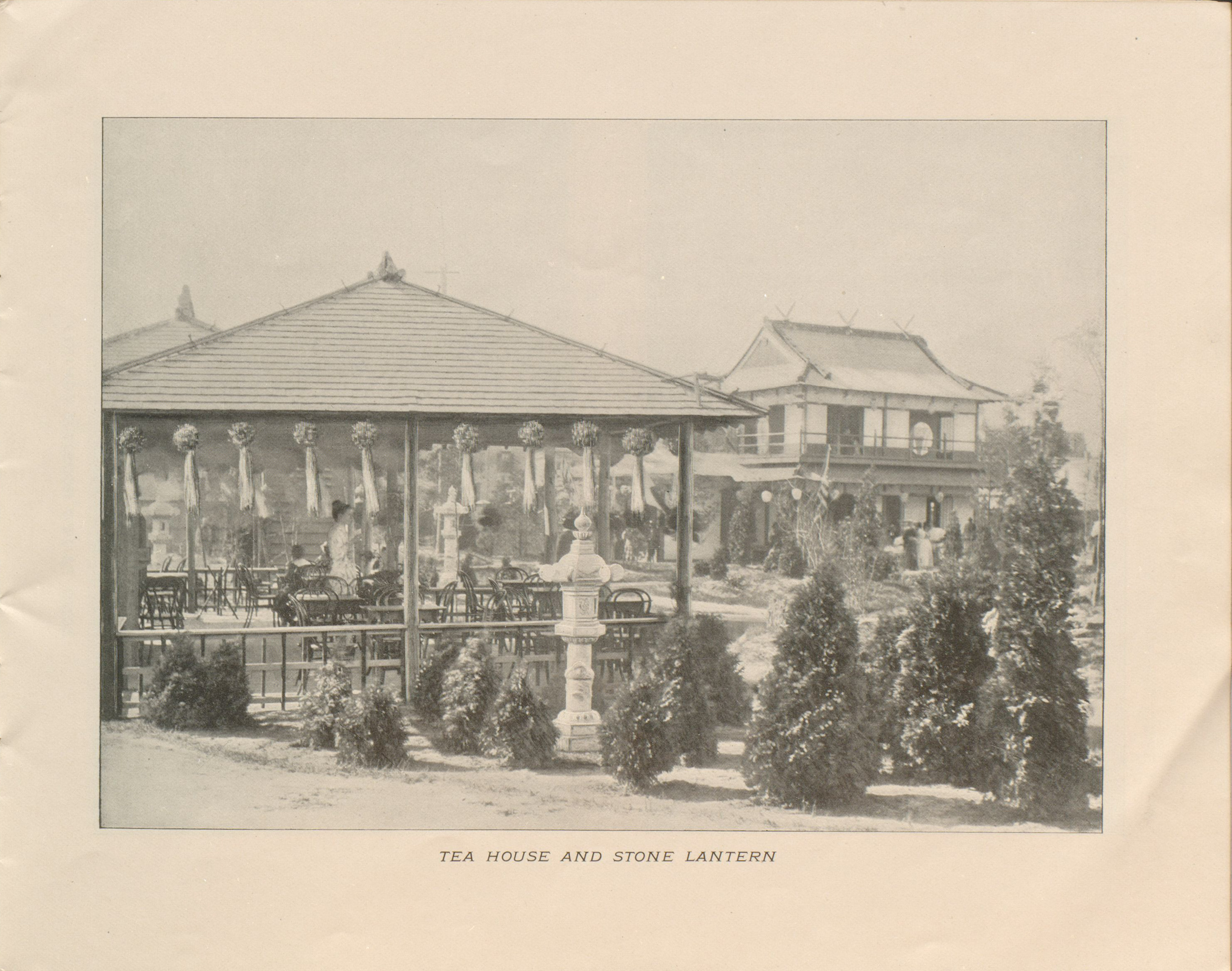

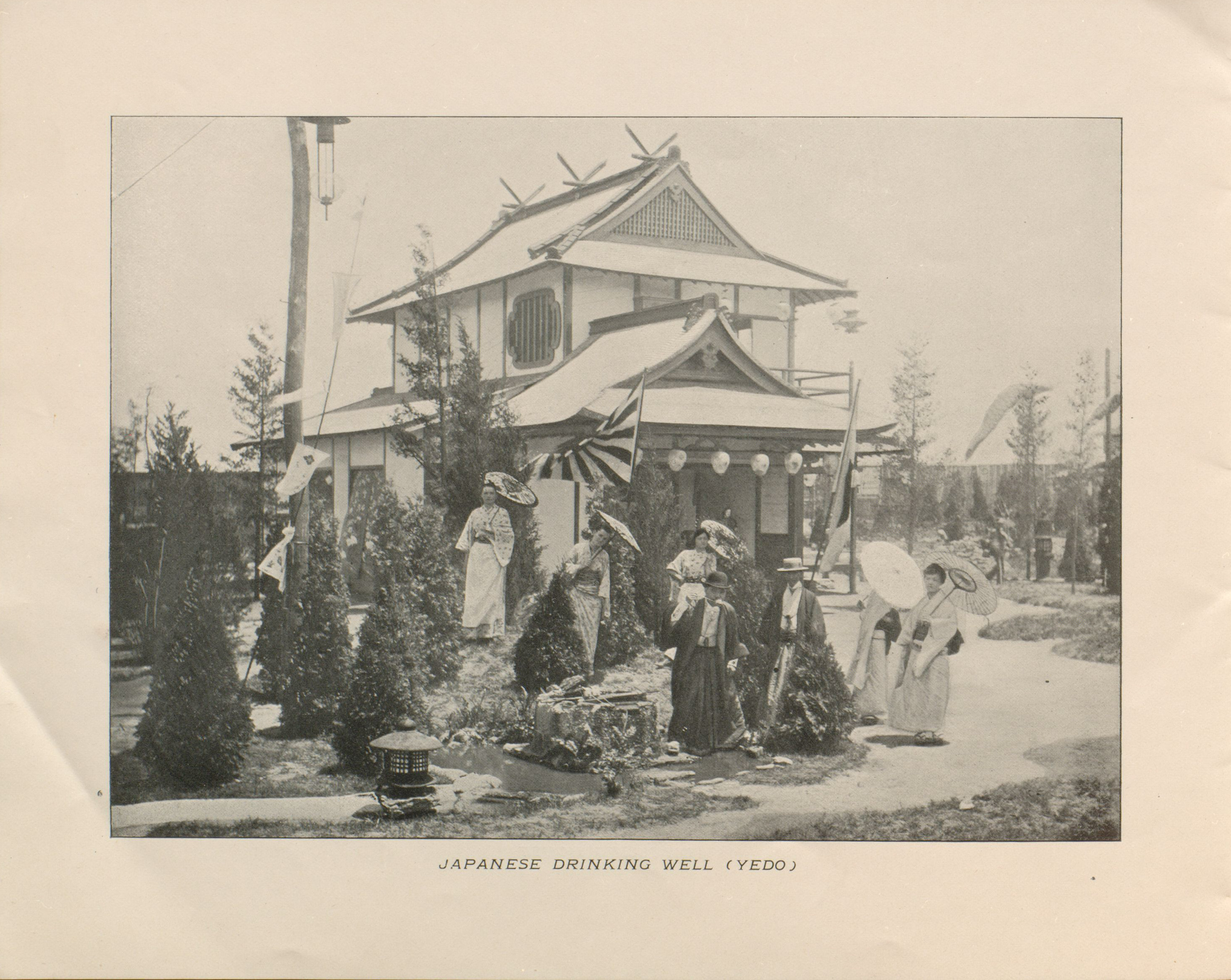

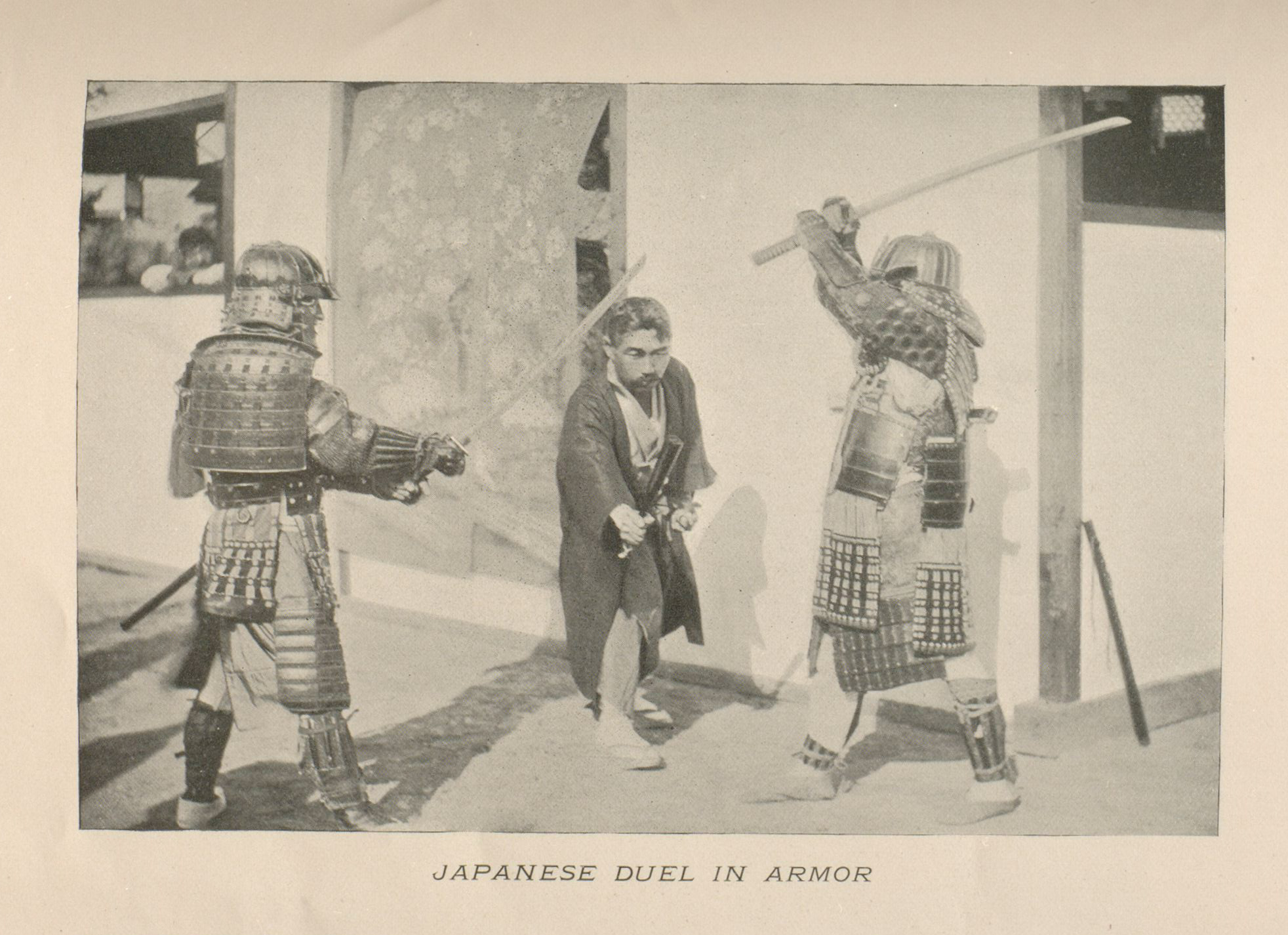

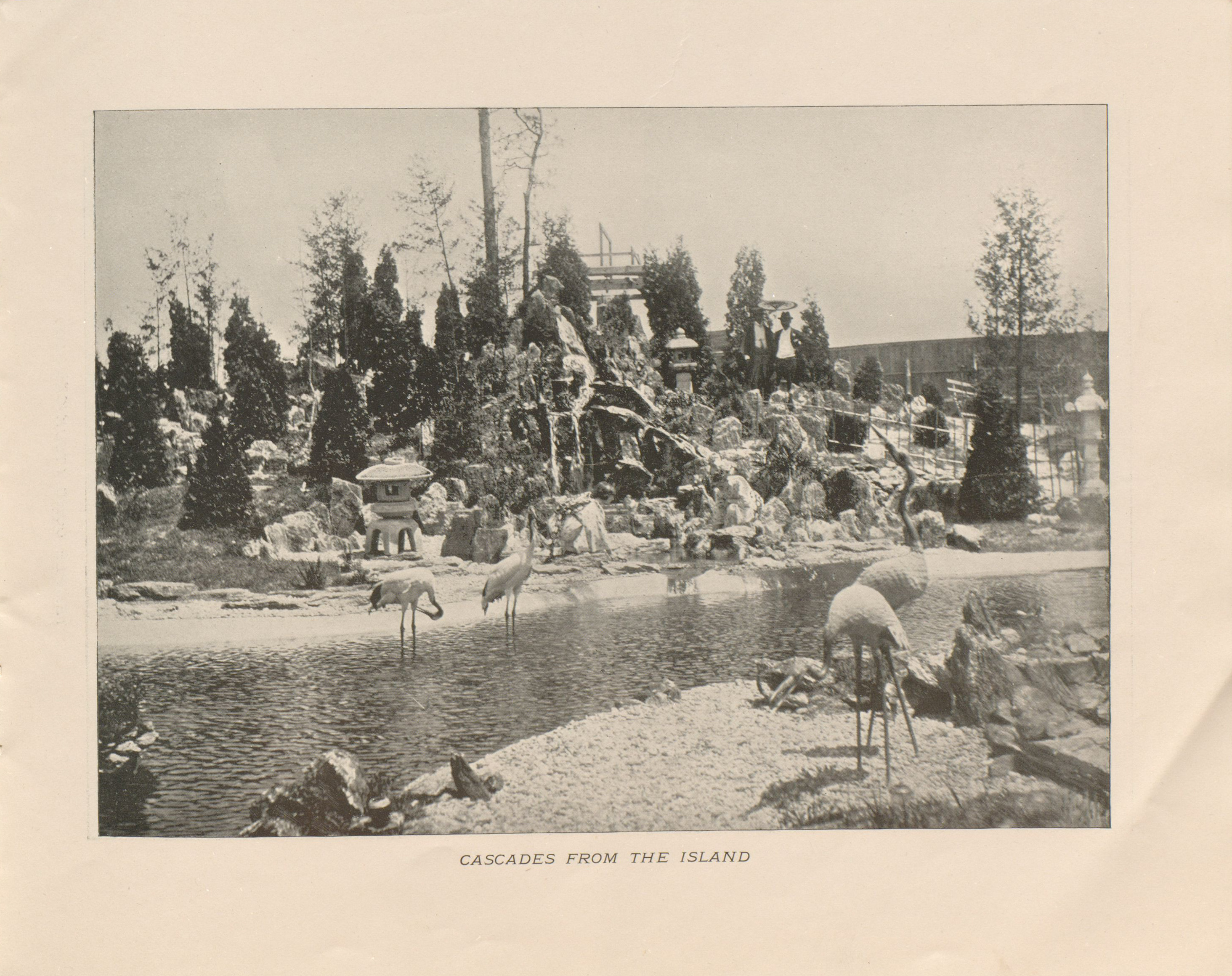

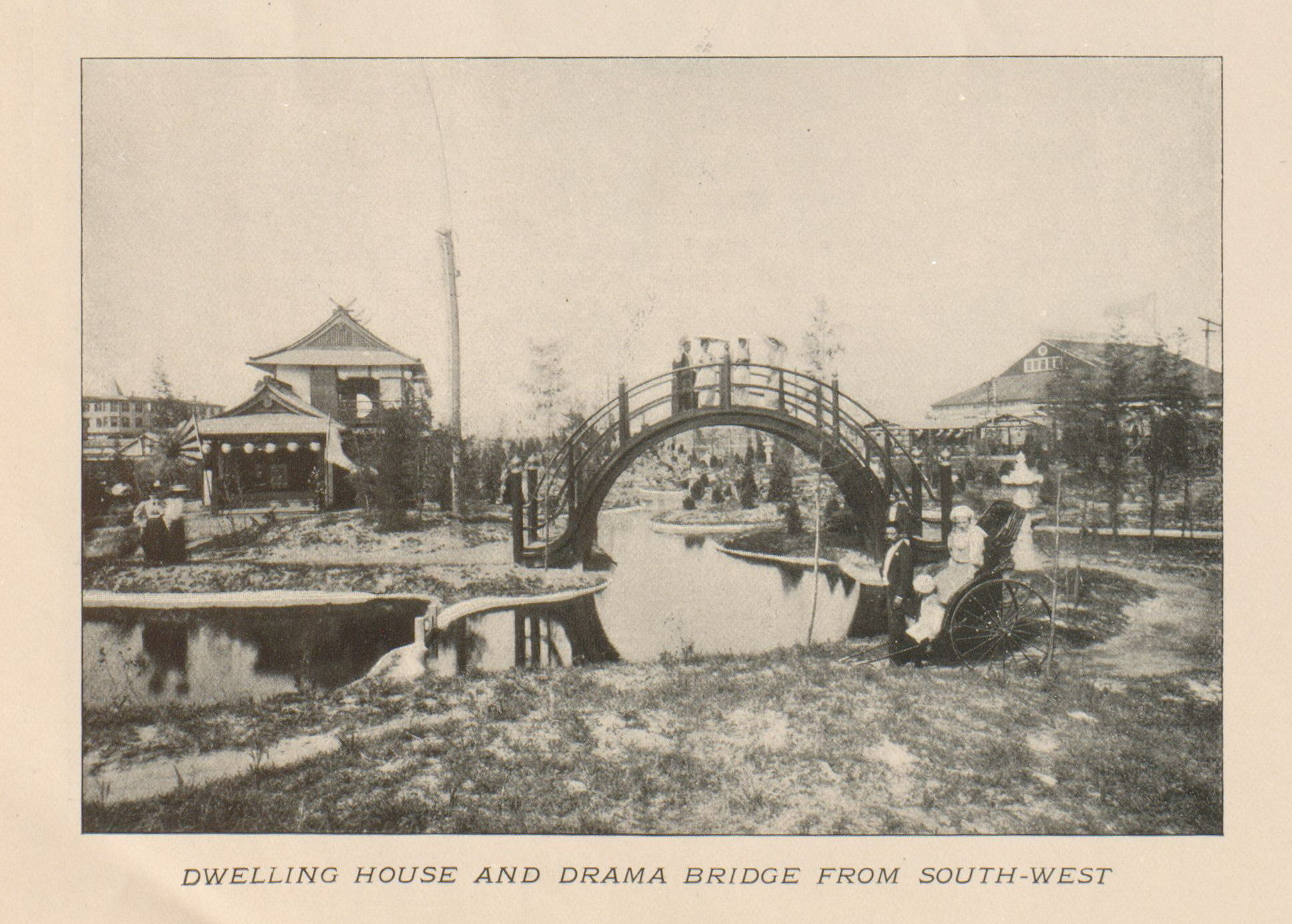

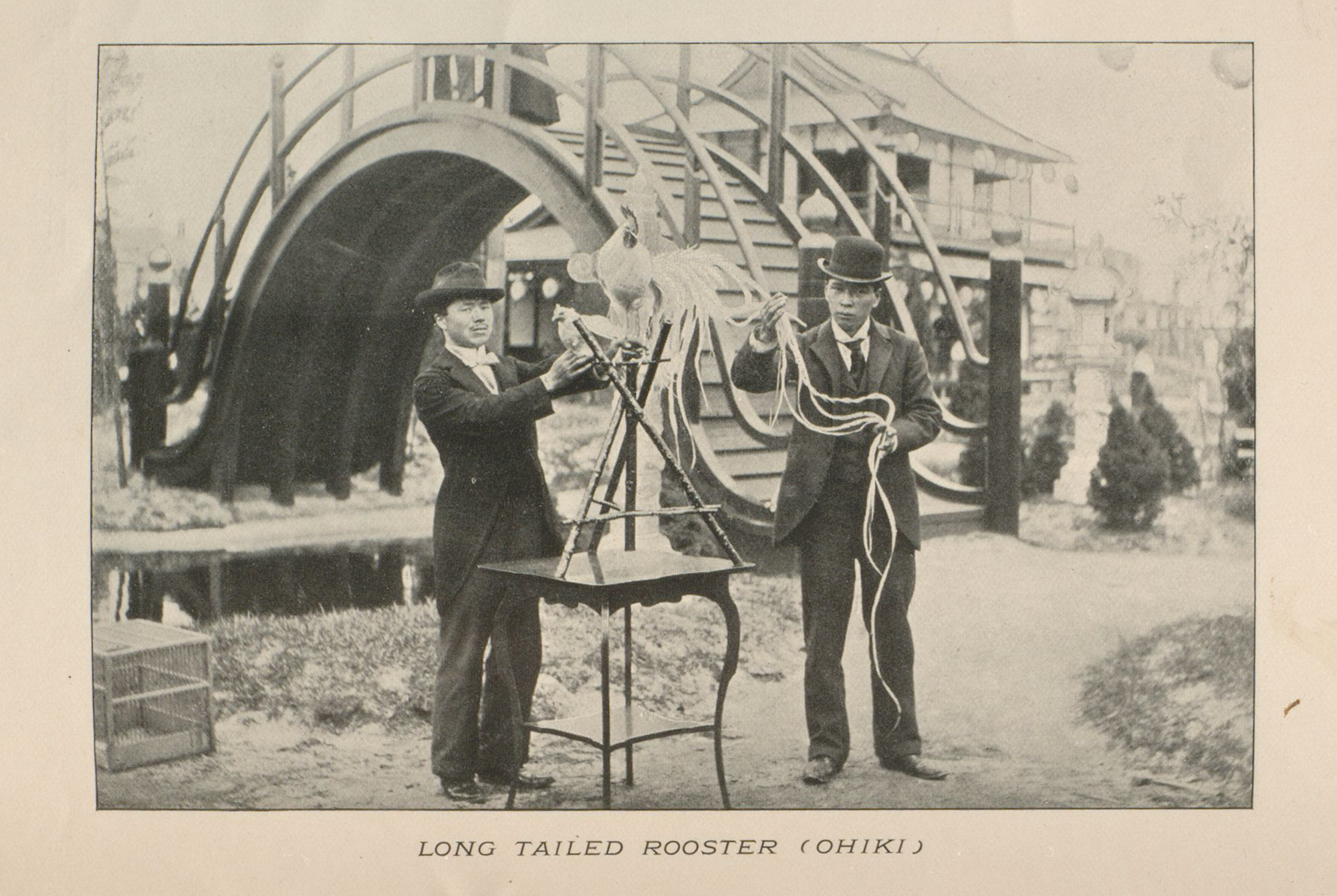

== Arai's films and the Kawakami tour ==
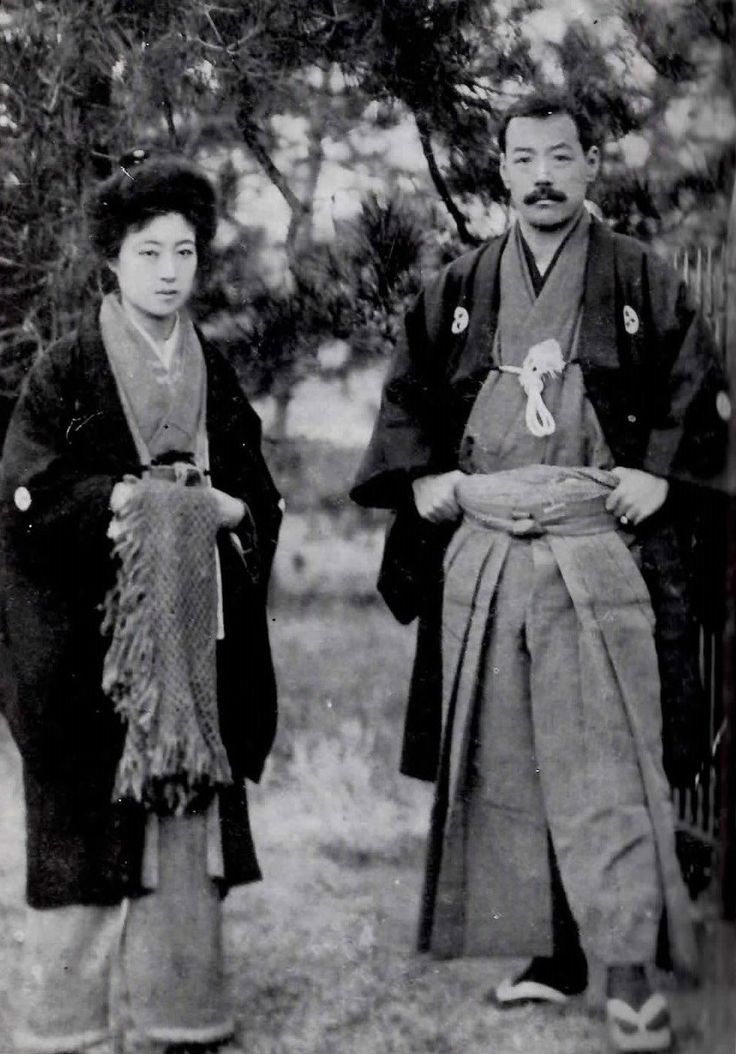
Kawakami Otojiro and Sadayakko

In 1896 Kushibiki and Arai returned to Japan, to recruit talent for current and future projects, and bringing along two of what would be Japan's first motion picture projectors. Arai had "bought two Vitascopes and a dozen films" from the Edison Company and began screening in early February in Asakusa. In March Arai arranged screenings at the Kawakami-za in Kanda, a modern Western-style theater opened the previous year by actor-playwright Kawakami Otojirō. Kawakami's meeting with Kushibiki at the event would have far-reaching effects.

"Kushibiki," according to Joseph Anderson, "had been looking for his next Japanese novelty. He proposed a tour to Kawakami that would 'introduce the New Theatre to American ladies and gentlemen.'" Kawakami hoped to travel to Paris to perform with his troupe at the 1900 Paris Exposition. "At the very least, such a trip could help pay Kawakami's expenses for getting to the exhibition in Paris."

In February 1899, Kushibiki visited the Kobe hospital where Kawakami was convalescing after an illness. On March 1, the Miyako Shimbun, a Kyoto newspaper, reported that Kawakami planned to leave in 20 days with his wife Sadayakko, niece Tsuru, and an 18-member troupe. Before their departure, Kushibiki "left suddenly for San Francisco ahead of the Kawakami company with the explanation that he was called back early because his Atlantic City enterprise was in trouble and he was not feeling well."

The Kawakami troupe arrived in San Francisco on May 21 to find that "Kushibiki was not there to take care of them as he promised. He had had a major loss in his business and could no longer afford to sponsor them. So he handed them over to a Japanese lawyer named Kosaku Mitsuse, who became their manager." They were also surprised to find that Kushibiki had featured Sadayakko as the troupe's main attraction. "There was no getting out of it, concluded Yakko. She was going to have to be an actress." Kushibiki's choice of manager proved disastrous: within weeks Mitsuse had driven the troupe into bankruptcy through mismanagement and outright theft. But their eventual success was largely the result of Kushibiki's promotion of Sadayakko as actress. By the time they returned to Japan she was recognized as a major international star.

== New York ==
In 1901, Kushibiki organized "Fair Japan" at the Buffalo, New York Pan-American Exposition that ran from May to November. On the morning of July 27, running to catch a moving trolley car to the Exposition grounds, he had a tragic mishap. Slipping, his left leg caught under the wheels, and had to be amputated just below the knee. The Buffalo Evening News, reporting the story, described Kushibiki as "one of the best known among the Pan-American concessionaires." When gangrene set in, a second operation was performed. "At first it was thought he stood but small chance of recovery," but "a strong constitution pulled him through." At the end of August he was still hospitalized; "his partner, Mr. Arai, has had charge of the Japanese village, and a monster benefit has been prepared in behalf of Kushibiki." Finally, on September 26, Kushibiki, making his first appearance at the Exposition since the accident, "hobbled through the Midway on crutches. In spite of his misfortune he was as philosophic and debonnaire as ever."

Pan-American Exposition, Buffalo (1901)

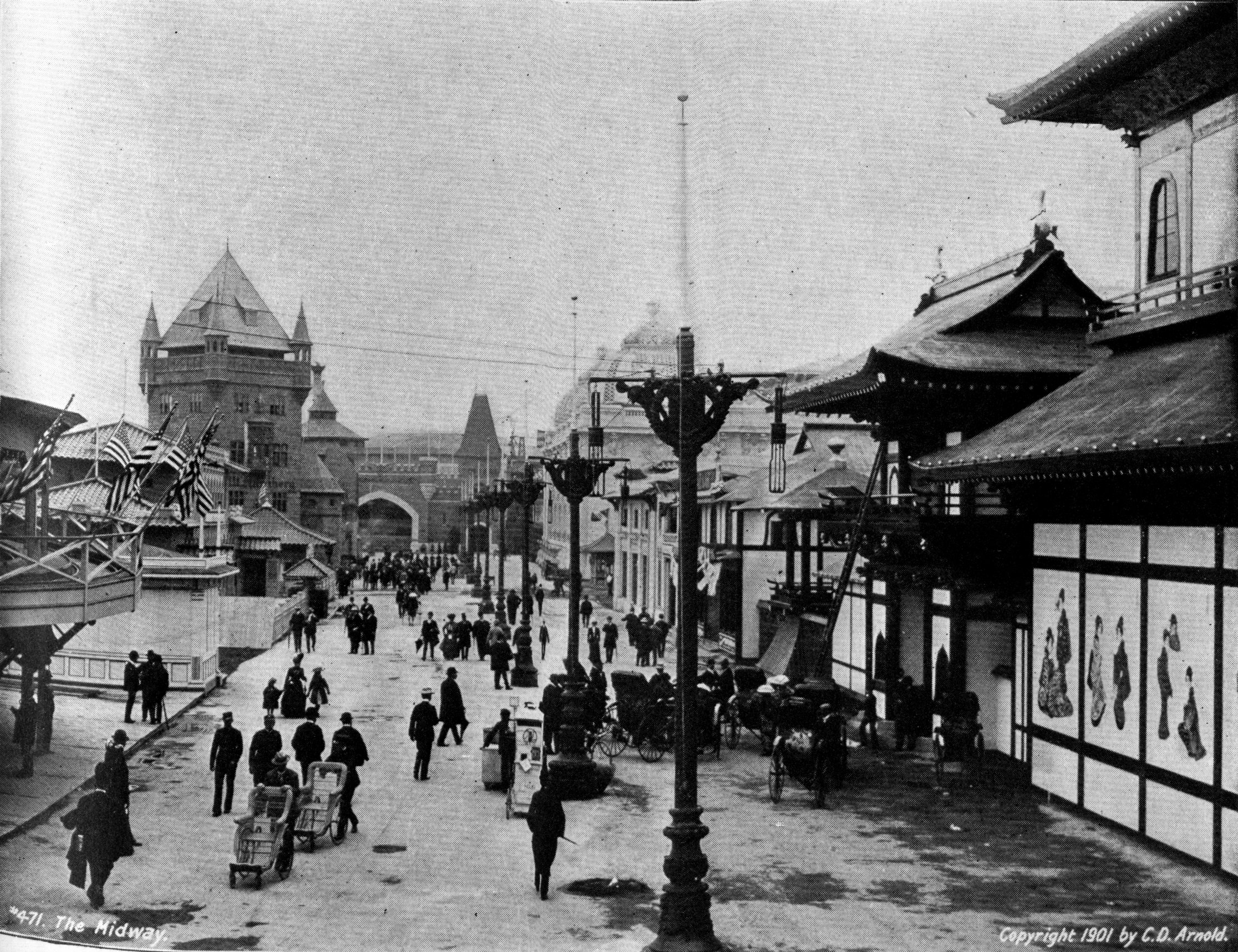

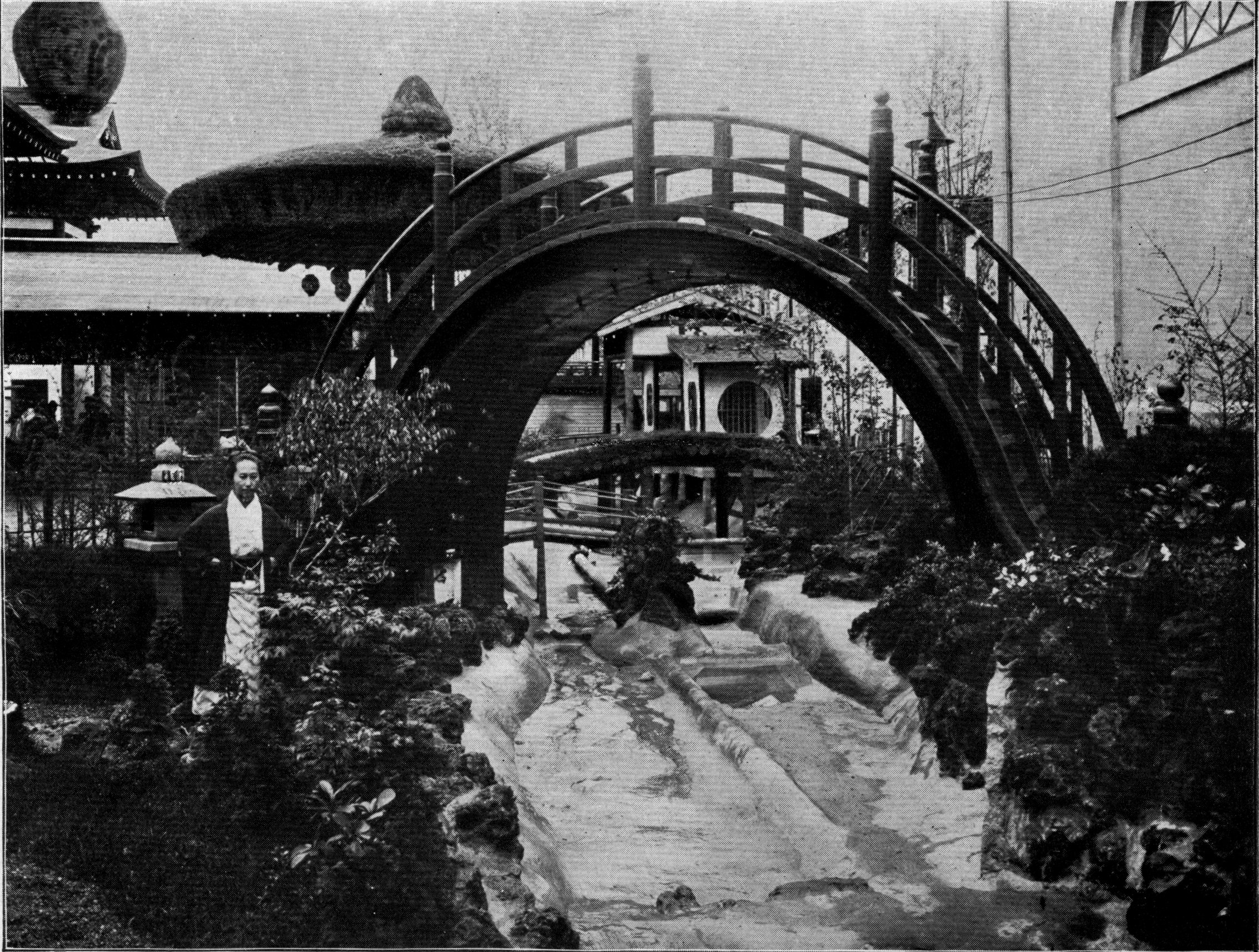

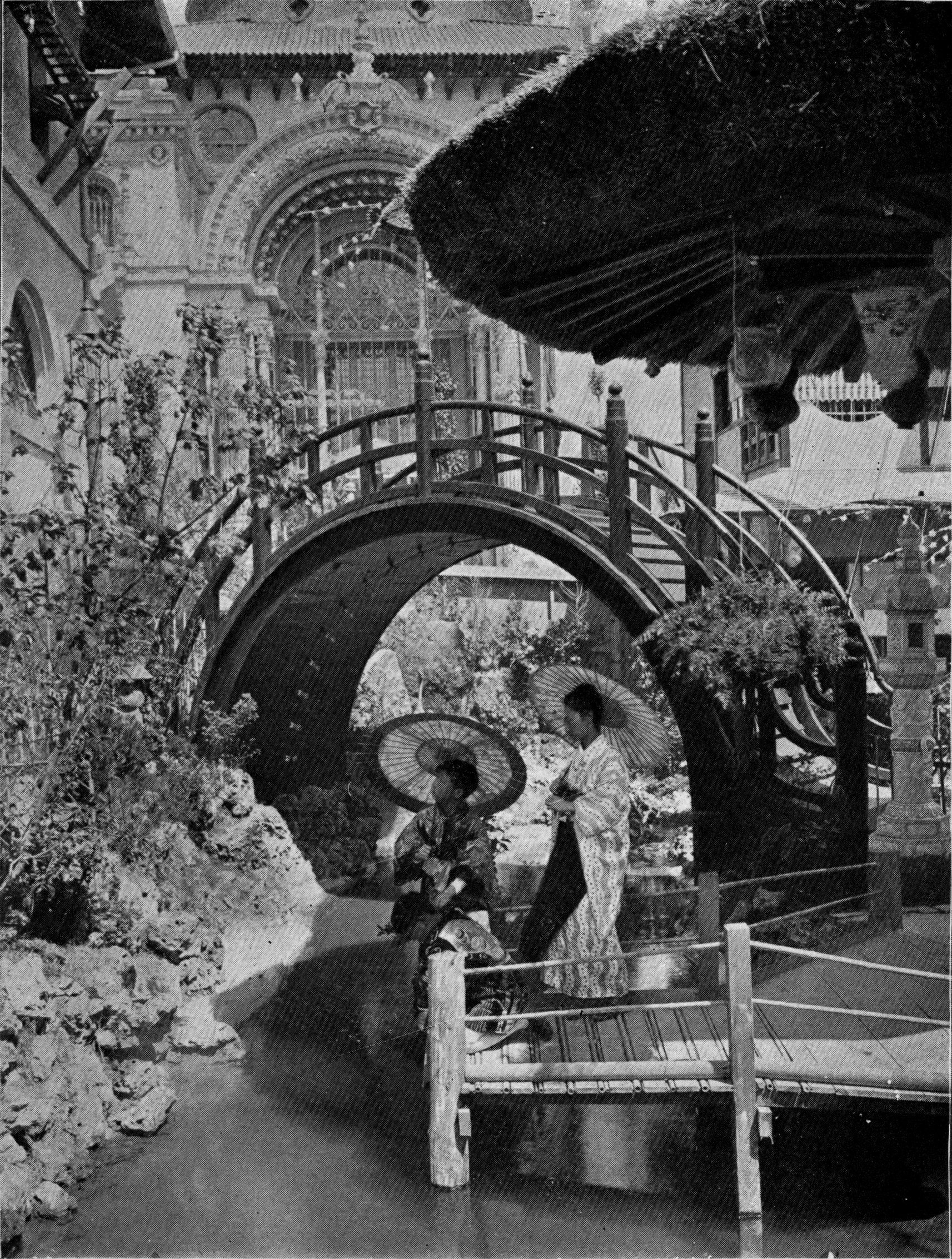

Kushibiki had little time to lose in organizing his next "Fair Japan" in Charleston for the South Carolina Inter-State and West Indian Exposition, set to open on December 1, 1901. "A Japanese rock garden, complete with Bonsai trees, waterfalls, and bridges, was recreated inside the Fair Japan concession. A typical tea house with quaint booths was attended by geisha girls. There was also a theatre where actors, jugglers, and tumblers entertained fairgoers. Price of admission was 15¢; admission to the theatre was 15¢ extra." The exposition continued until June 20, 1902.

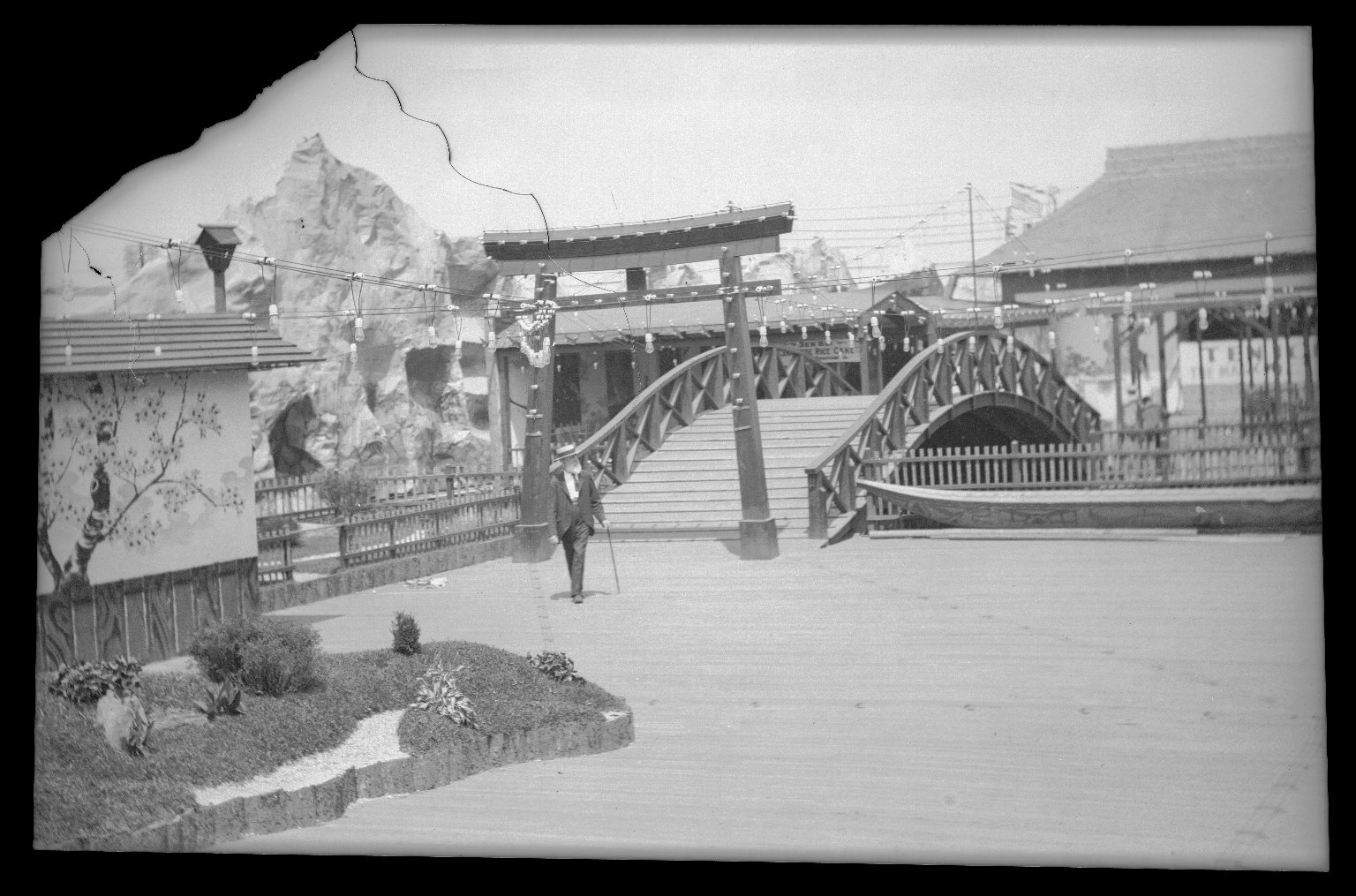
Luna Park, Coney Island, 1903

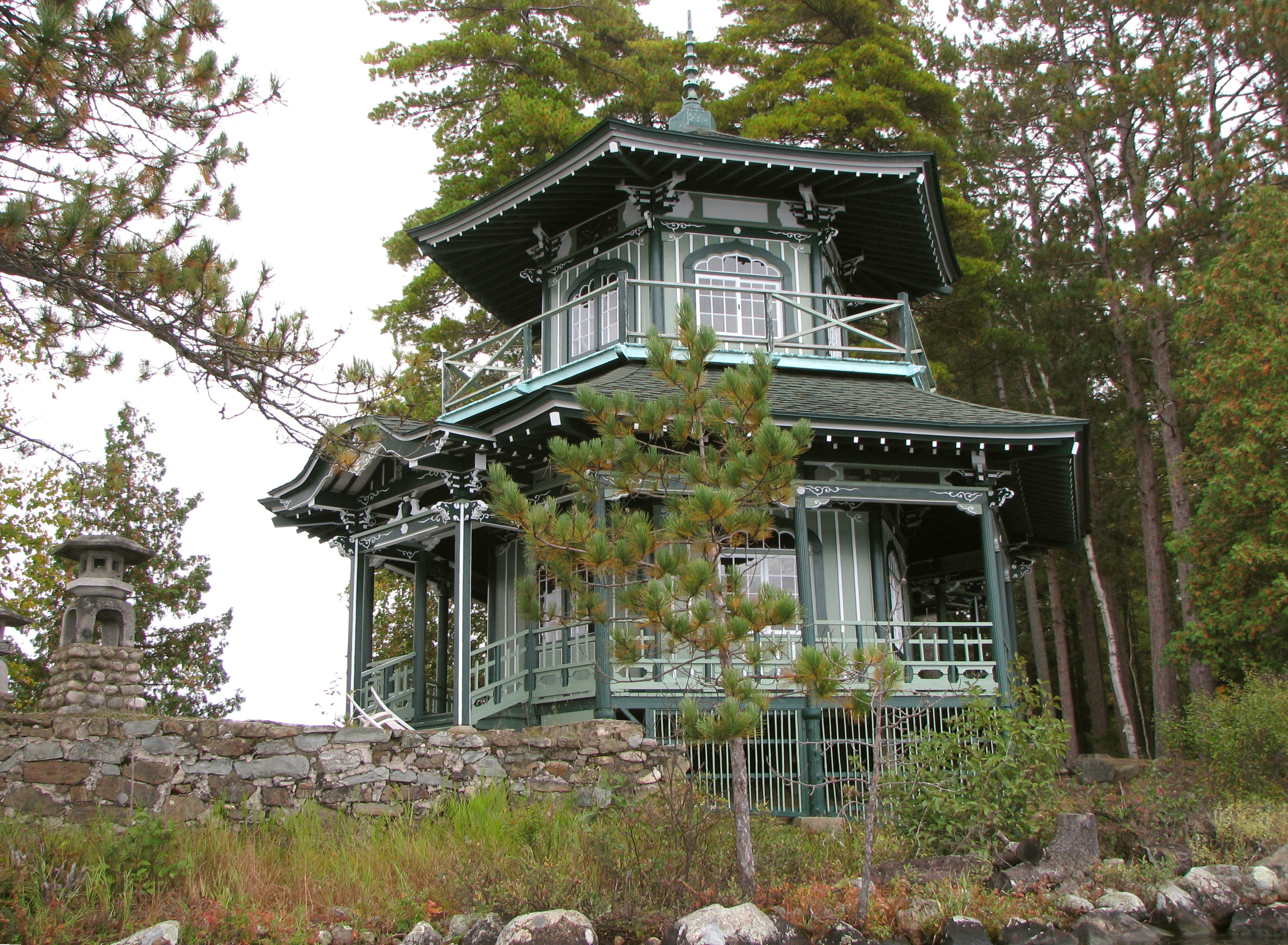
F.W. Vanderbilt's Tea Room

Kushibiki had at least three New York projects underway in the summer of 1903. The first was a Japanese Village and Japanese Gardens for Luna Park, an amusement park on Coney Island whose feature attraction was A Trip to the Moon, a popular ride debuted at the Buffalo Exposition two years earlier. The second was a "Japan by Night" installation and concession for the rooftop garden at Madison Square Garden, created to accompany a Japanese-themed play, Otoyo. Japanese writer Yone Noguchi worked as a curio-seller, “doing a pretty good business, selling things between 7 and 12 dollars a night,” and stayed through the summer, as it was “awfully jolly to do such a thing upon the roof full of fresh air and music.” Kushibiki's third New York project was a set of Japanese-style buildings for railroad millionaire Frederick William Vanderbilt's summer camp in the Adirondacks at Upper St. Regis Lake.

== St. Louis and Portland ==
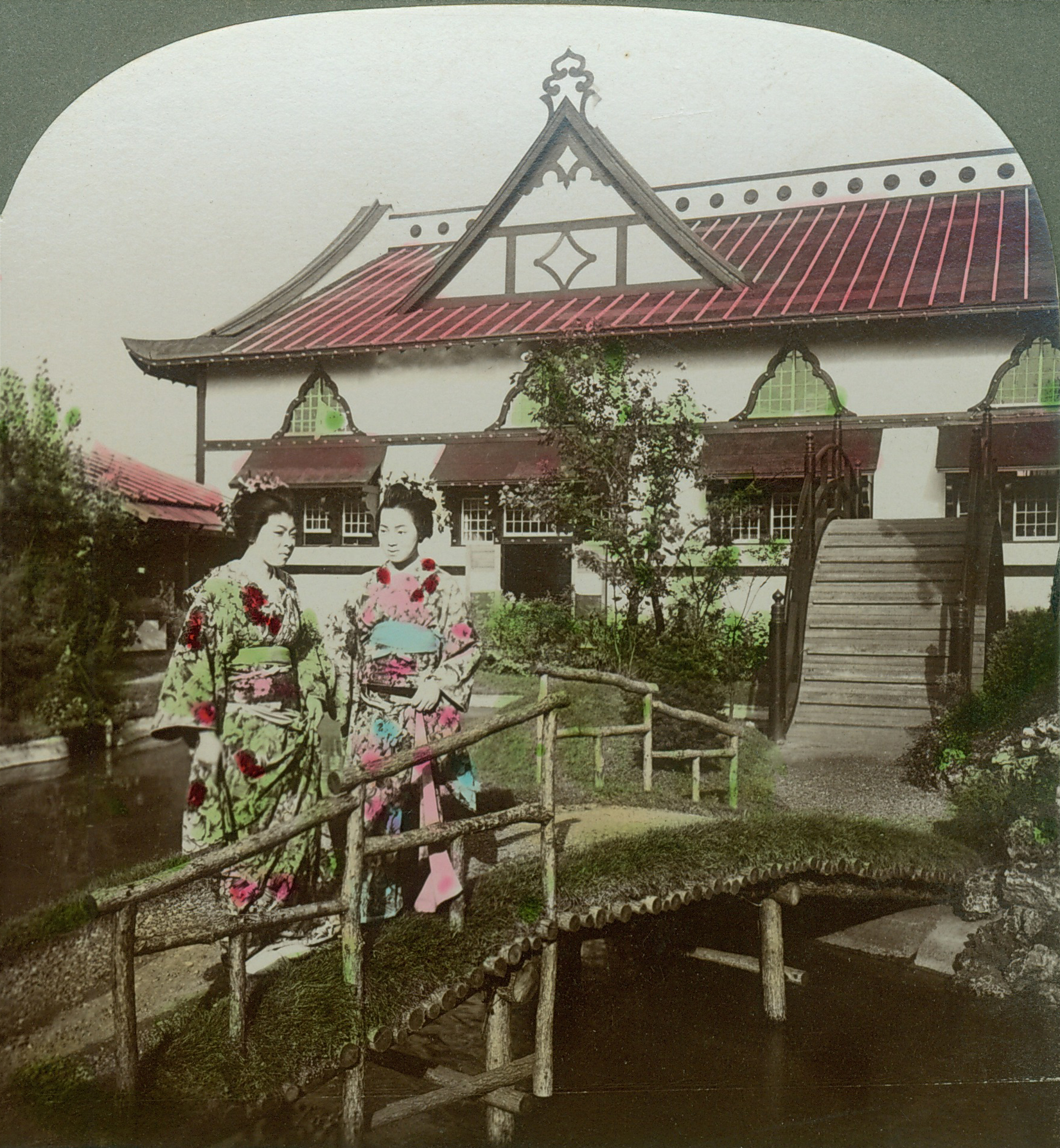
Geisha at St. Louis (1904)

Kushibiki's major project for 1904 was the Louisiana Purchase Exposition held in St. Louis from April 30 to December 1, 1904. The St. Louis Exposition received unprecedented support from the Japanese government: $400,000, plus $50,000 from the Japanese colonial government of Formosa, and over $250,000 in Japanese commercial and regional government investments. A large garden featured a replica of Kyoto's famous Kinkakuji.

In another part of the grounds was "Fair Japan on the 'Pike' ... a private concession controlled by the Fair Japan Company, which was organized by Y. Kushibiki, S. Arai, and several prominent business men of St. Louis." Visitors passed through a large Niōmon-style gate, said to be a "reproduction of the famous portal at Nikko," built at a cost of $25,000.

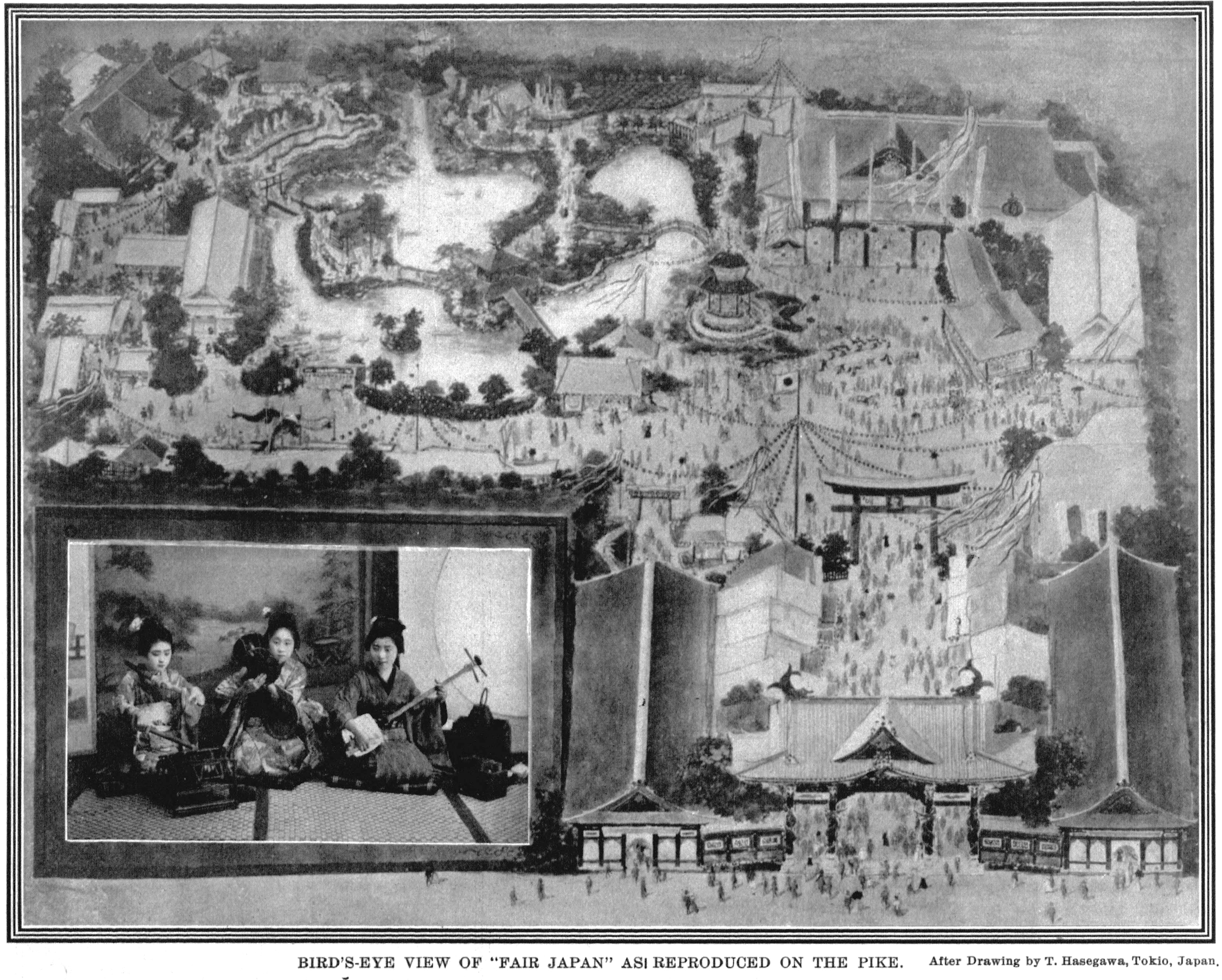
Bird's Eye View of "Fair Japan" as Reproduced on The Pike, After drawing by T. Hasegara, Tokio, Japan

The exposition would prove to be especially important because the Russo-Japanese War, which began on February 8, 1904, remained in progress through the whole of the exposition. In April, Kushibiki announced that thirty geisha had embarked from Yokohama and were expected to arrive about April 25.

St. Louis: Louisiana Purchase Exposition (1904)

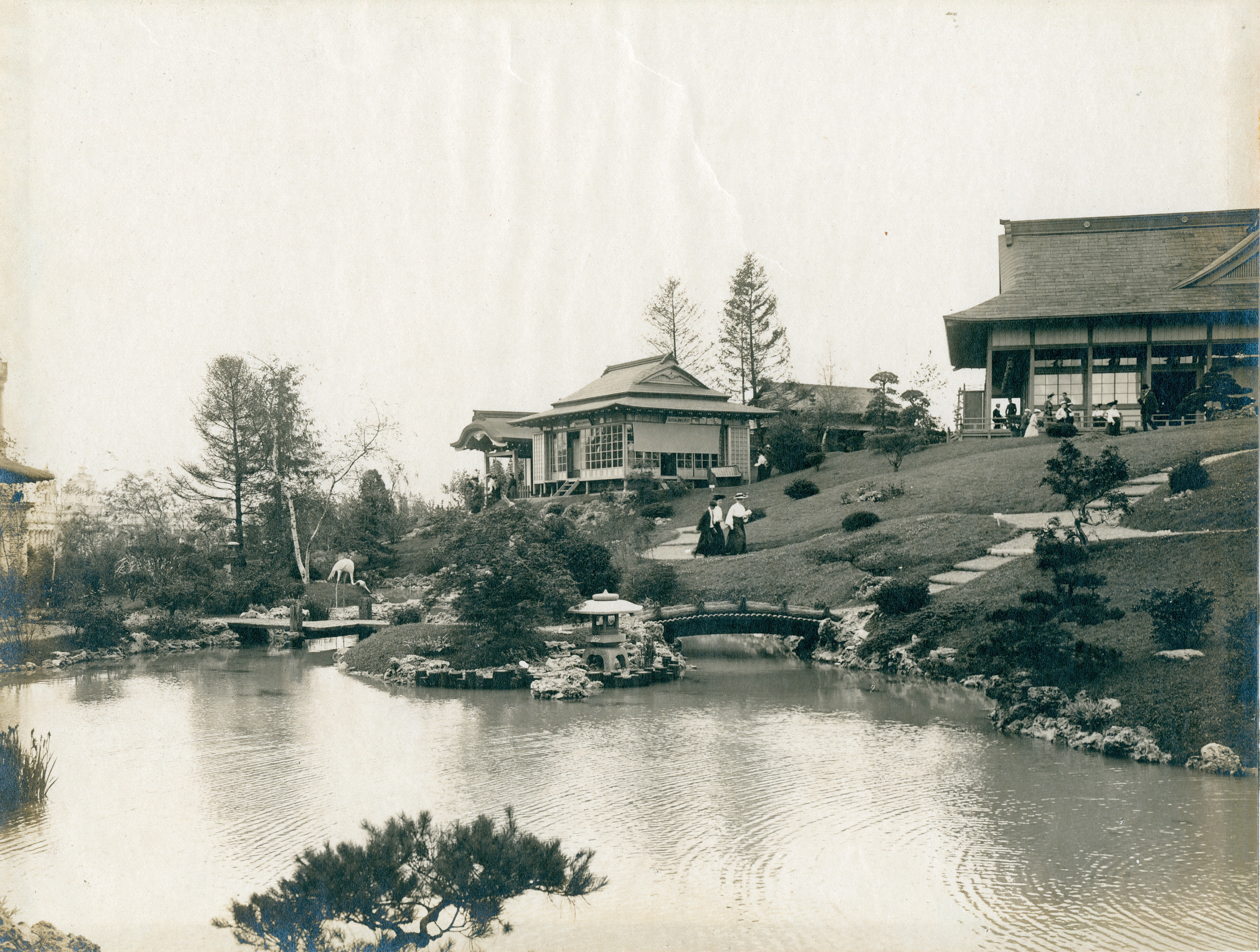

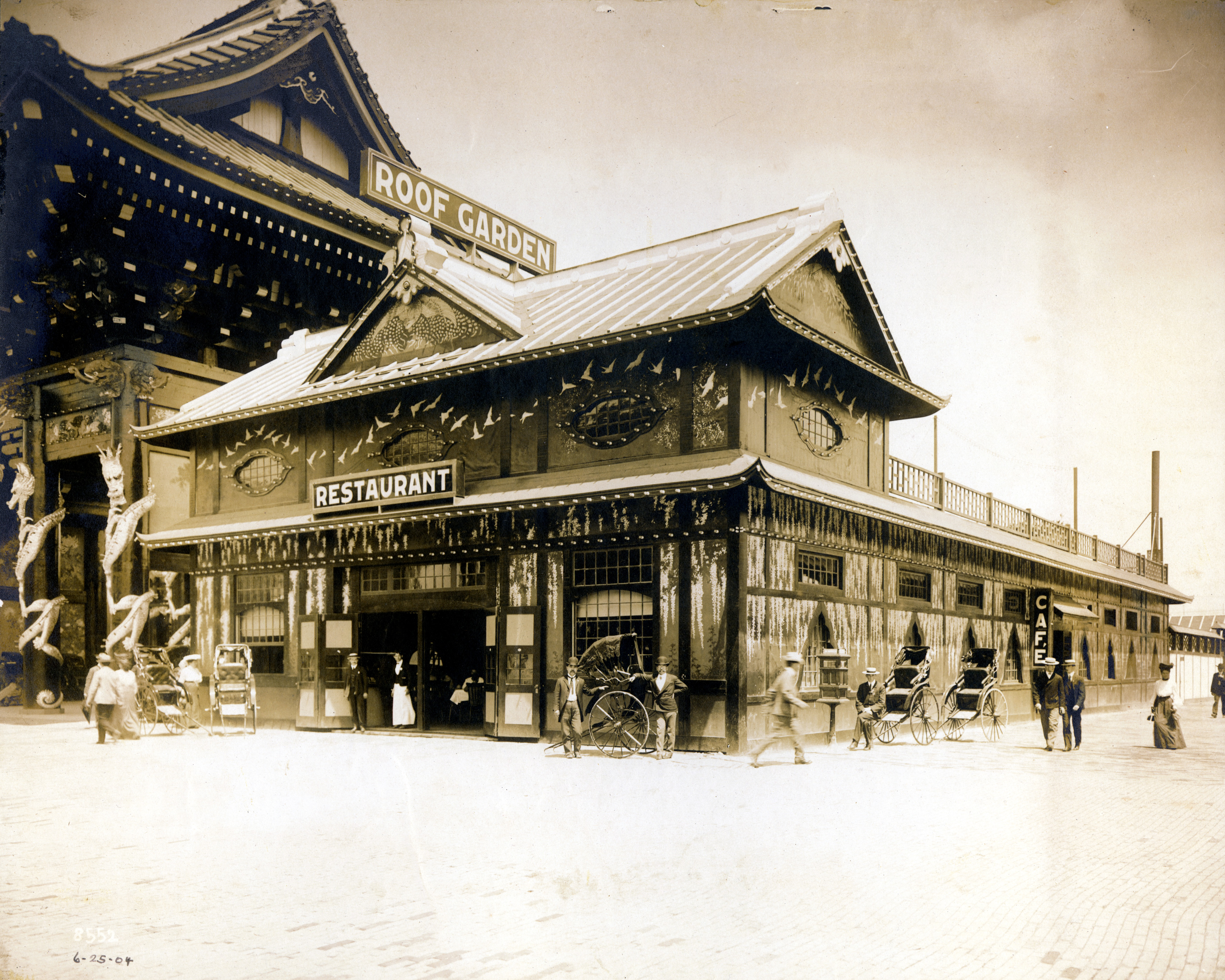

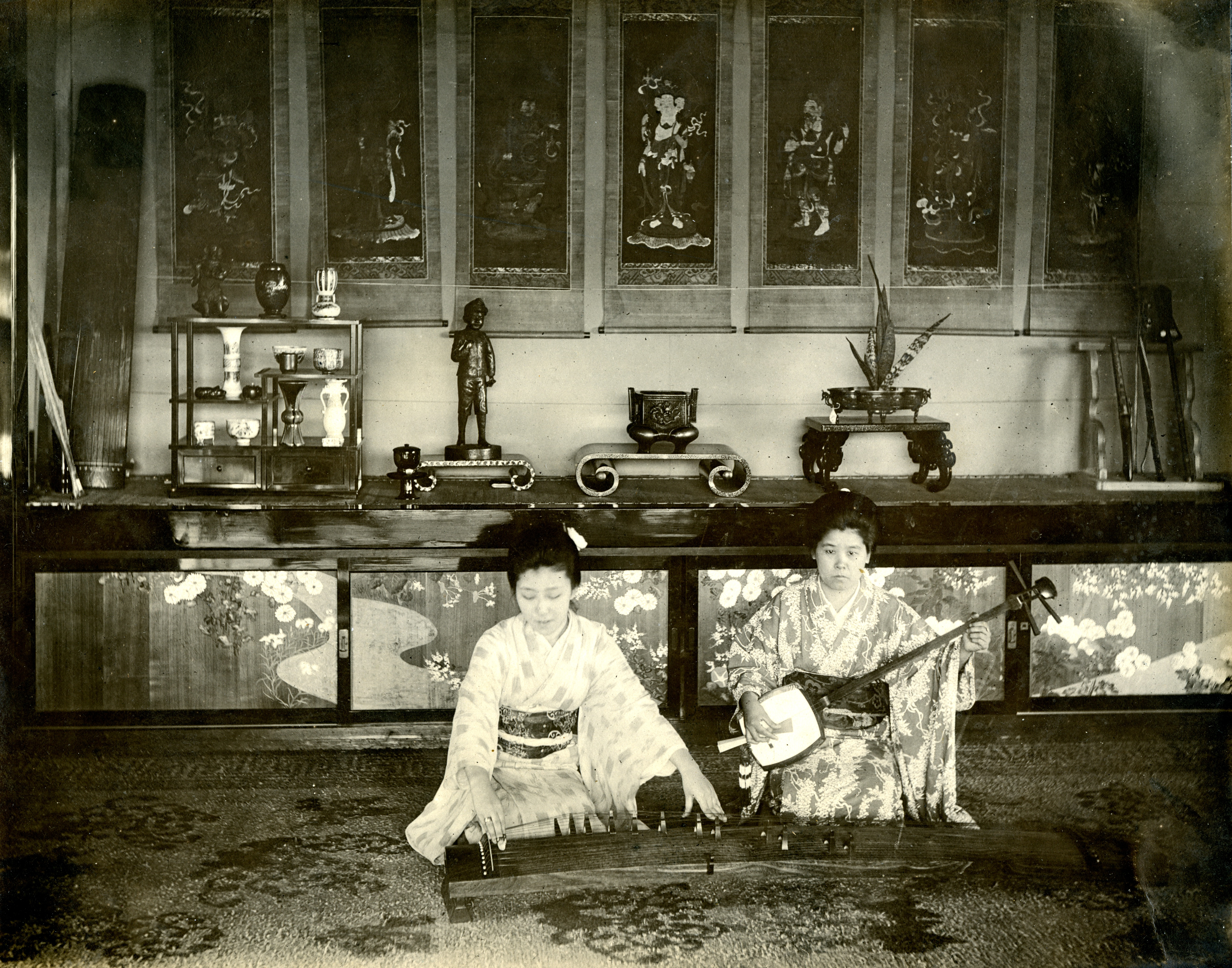

Kushibiki's popularity in St. Louis was mentioned in the local press both before and during the exposition. The St. Louis Republic described him as "an interesting personality," and called him "the Japanese Barnum." "His shrewdness is a tincture of Japanese acumen and very modern business methods of the big Western Republic, which the Japanese as a nation love to emulate." The World's Fair Bulletin described him as "an exceedingly intellectual Japanese, and highly popular among all his brethren of the amusement world. "

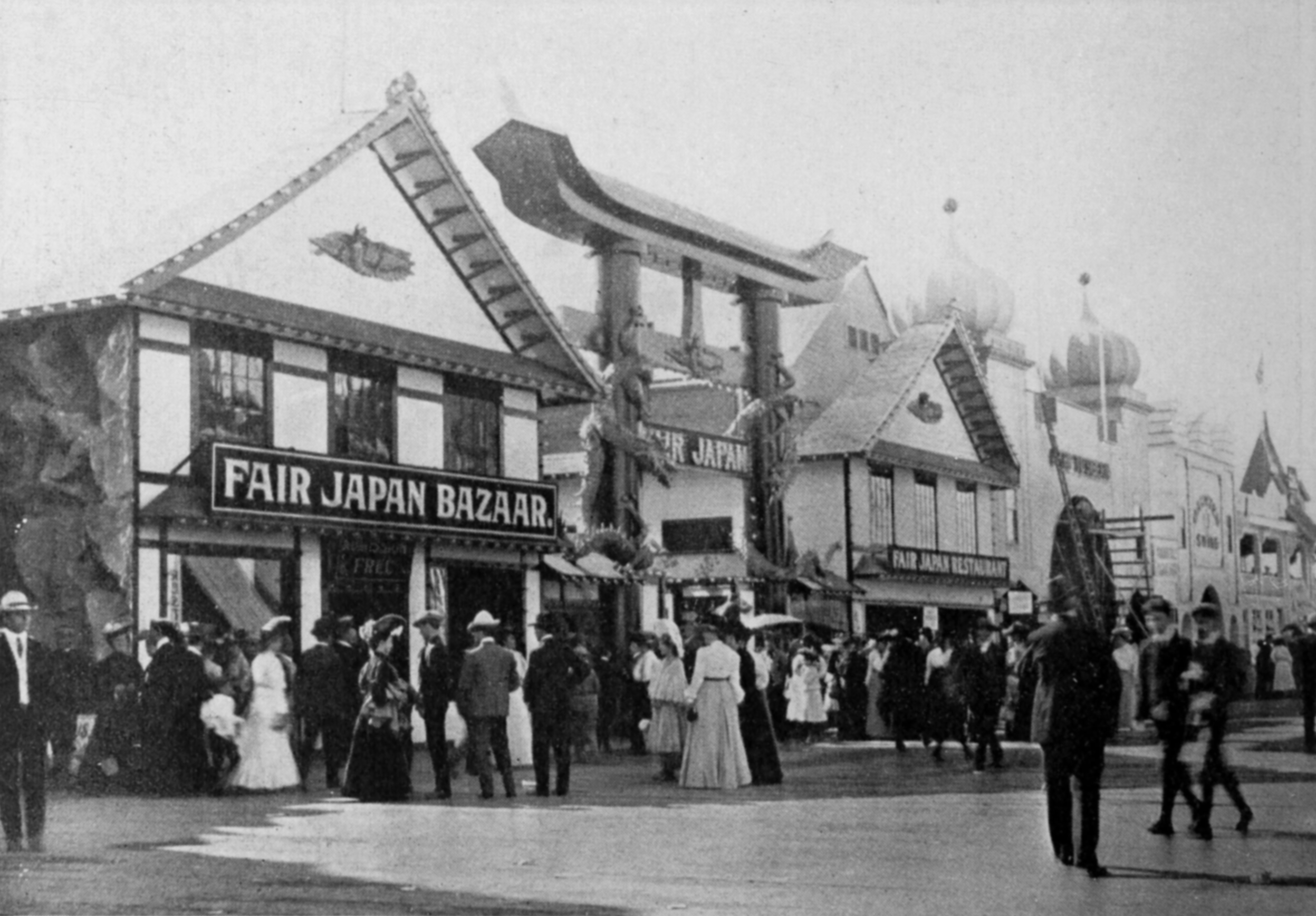
Portland, Oregon (1905)

Kushibiki generally received little official credit for his exposition organizing role. Twenty-six members of the Japan Commission at the St. Louis exposition—a president, vice-president, eleven commissioners, six experts, three secretaries, and four attaches (for the most part, government officials, diplomats, and experts with academic credentials)—are named in the exposition's Official Directory, but Kushibiki and Arai are not among them. But at his next exposition—the Lewis and Clark Centennial Exposition held in Portland, Oregon the following year—Kushibiki was appointed as one of Japan's three Commissioners. In an unusual honor, he was also appointed Second Vice-President of the Executive Commissioners' Association, making him the only non-American member of the exposition's executive committee. By the time the exposition opened on June 1, just days after the Japanese navy destroyed the remains of the Russian fleet in the Tsushima Straits, Japan was celebrating imminent victory in the Russo-Japanese War.

== Jamestown, Jacksonville, and Seattle ==
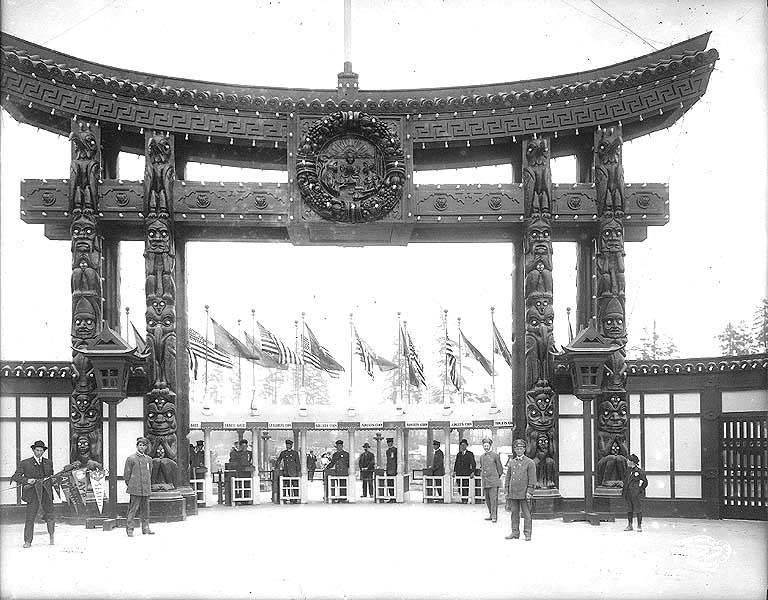
Kushibiki, far left, Seattle (1909)

Arai Saburo was not among the Portland commissioners. In 1904, he had become interested in Texas rice production after the Southern Pacific Railroad and the Houston Chamber of Commerce invited Japanese farmers to the region. During the St. Louis Expo, he visited Houston, the center of the rice industry. "His report was favorable, and there was divided among the Japanese colony at St. Louis a rice plantation in Matagorda county, Tex., covering 8,000 acres." Arai moved to El Campo, grew oranges and figs, and moved again to Alvin and Genoa. His Genoa nursery proved successful, and he remained in the business for decades.

In January 1906 Kushibiki could be found in Venice, California organizing fireworks and "installing an extensive exhibit of the art goods of Japan." The following year, he was in Virginia, serving as Commissioner General of the Japanese exhibit at the Jamestown Exposition. By January 1908 he had moved the Jamestown Japanese exhibits to Jacksonville for the Florida International Exposition, where he held the prestigious position of Director General.

The 1909 Alaska-Yukon-Pacific Exposition in Seattle had been originally planned for 1907 but postponed to avoid conflicting with the Jamestown Exposition. The exposition ran from June 1 to October 16. The extensive Japanese architecture at the Expo included a Japanese torii gate design at the south entrance with totem pole style pillars with illuminated eyes.

Alaska-Yukon-Pacific Exposition, Seattle (1909)

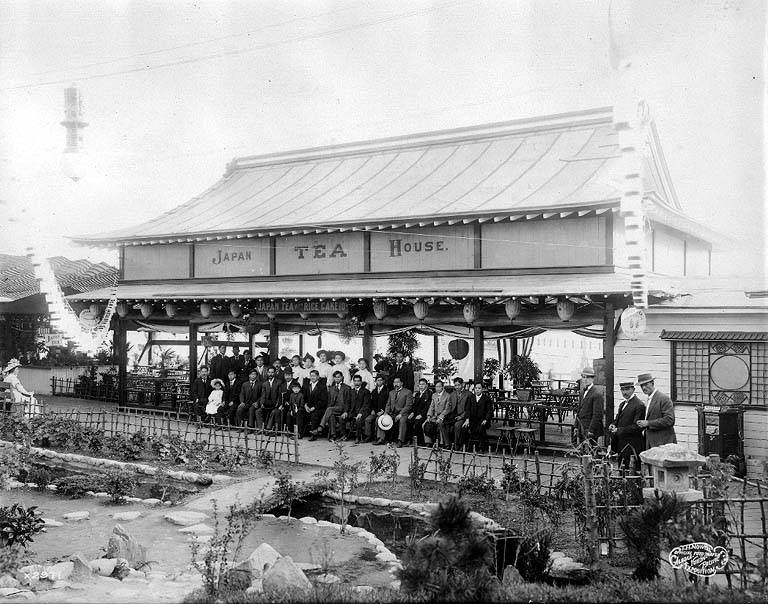

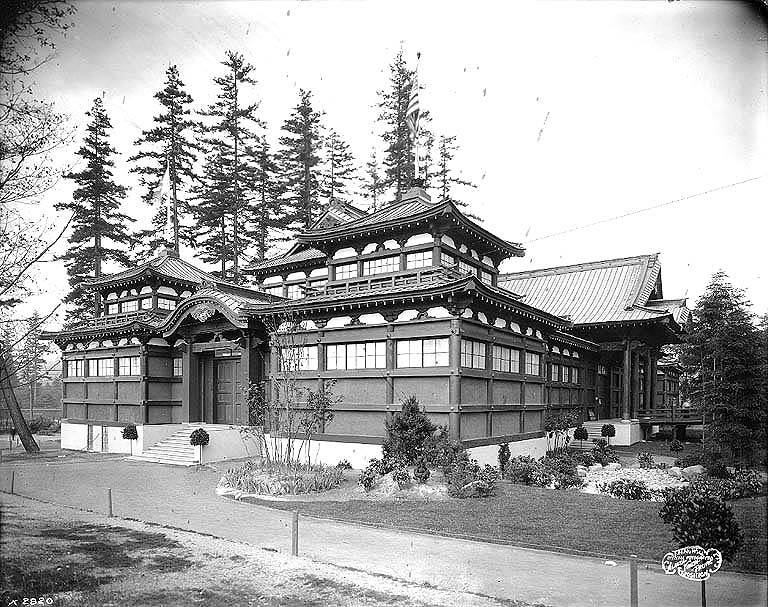

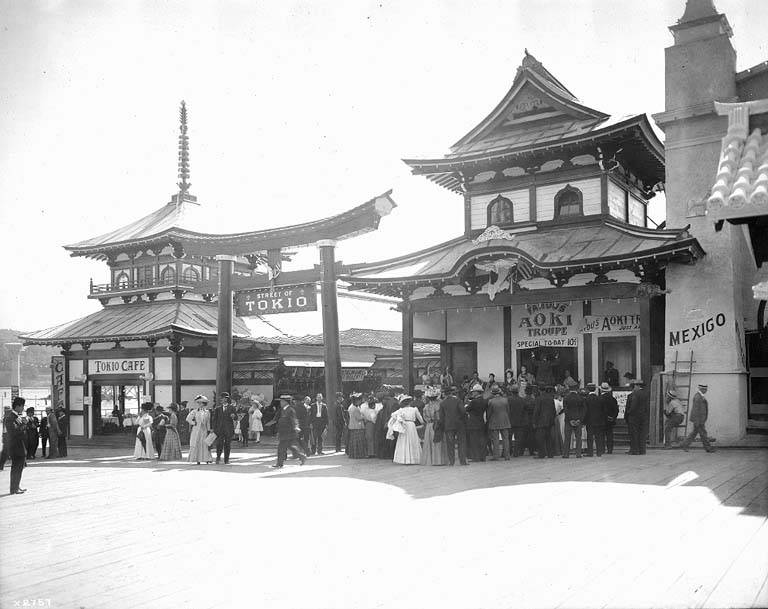

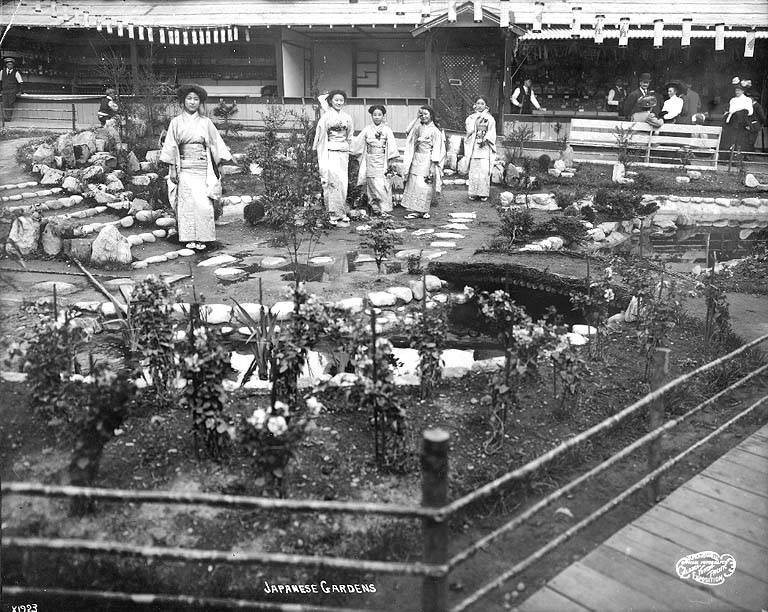

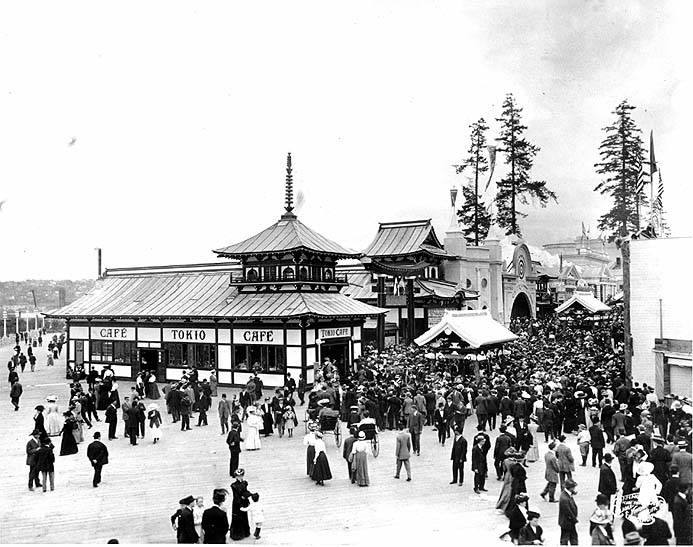

== London and Paris ==
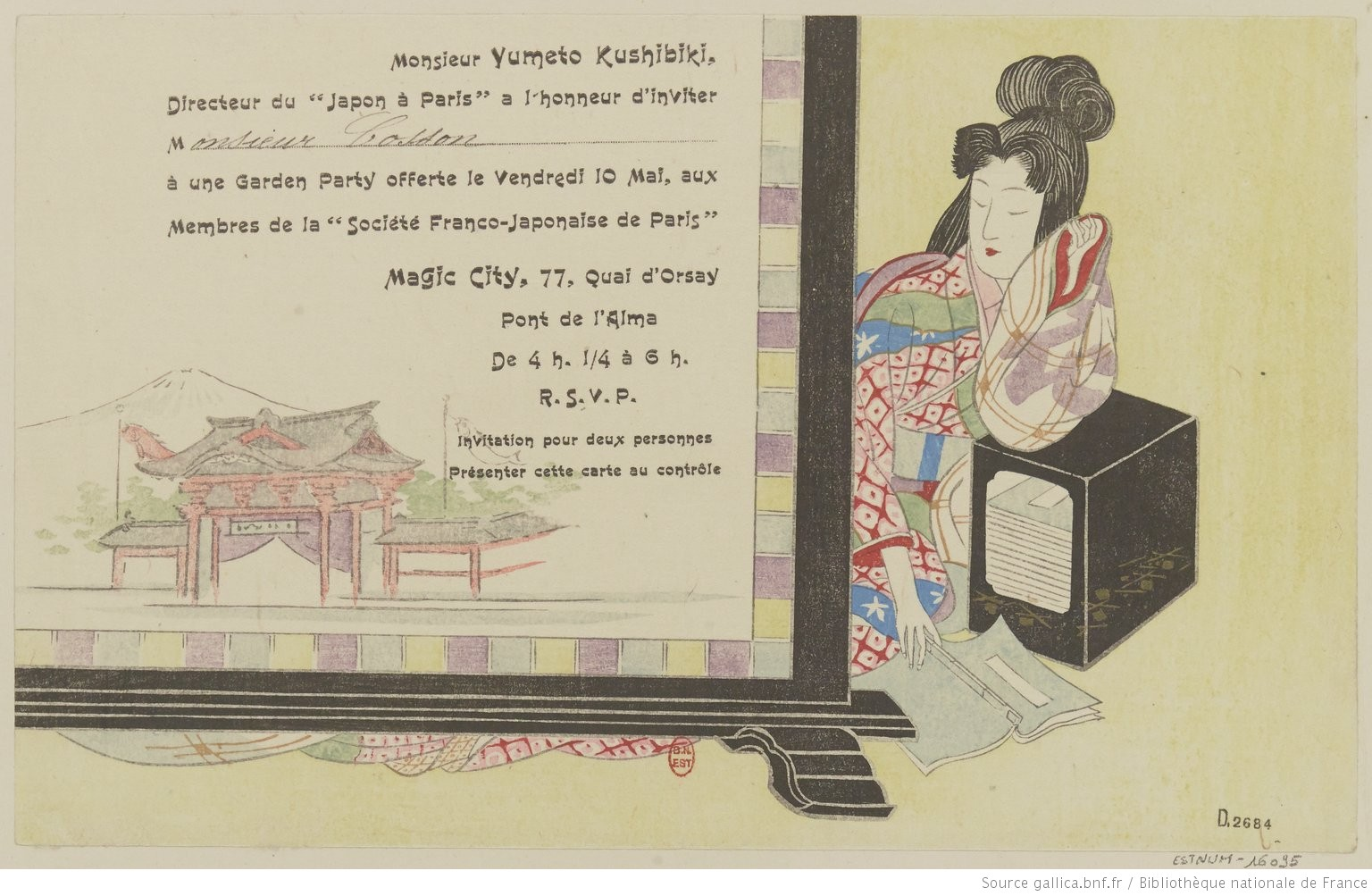
Paris garden party invitation

In 1910 Kushibiki was offered an opportunity to participate in the Japan–British Exhibition. The Exhibition, which ran from 14 May to 29 October 1910, was run by Imre Kiralfy's Exhibition Company, but as Ayako Hotta-Lister writes,

Some members of the Japanese Commission were apprehensive about leaving it entirely in the hands of the Exhibition Company to organize the Japanese entertainments, since they feared that as the Company would be ignorant of Japanese culture and customs there might arise some sort of misconduct which could offend the Japanese entertainers as well as Japanese visitors. They needed, therefore, a Japanese agent to oversee the entertainments section and to liaise between the Company and the entertainers; a Japanese expert on setting up a Japanese Village in international exhibitions, Kushibiki Yumeto, was employed by the Company as a supervisor on the recommendation of the Japanese Commission. Kushibiki was instructed by the Japanese Commission to oversee the general welfare of the entertainers, including the provision of handsome returns after the completion of their services. Although his initial contract ran only until June, the Japanese Commission found his work indispensable and, supported by a plea from the Japanese entertainers themselves, his contract was extended until the end of the Exhibition. Rented houses near the Exhibition site had to be found to accommodate most of the entertainers, except for a few who wished to stay at the site. Although there were some occasions when misunderstandings between the Company and the entertainers occurred, disaster was averted with the help of Kushibiki.

After the exhibition ended, Kushibiki went to Paris. The Bulletin de la Société franco-japonaise de Paris describes one garden party he organized for the Franco-Japanese Society on 10 May 1912, with jujitsu, koto and violin music, art, acrobatics, bonseki and refreshments. (Due to insufficient time, the final tea ceremony had to be omitted).

== San Francisco ==
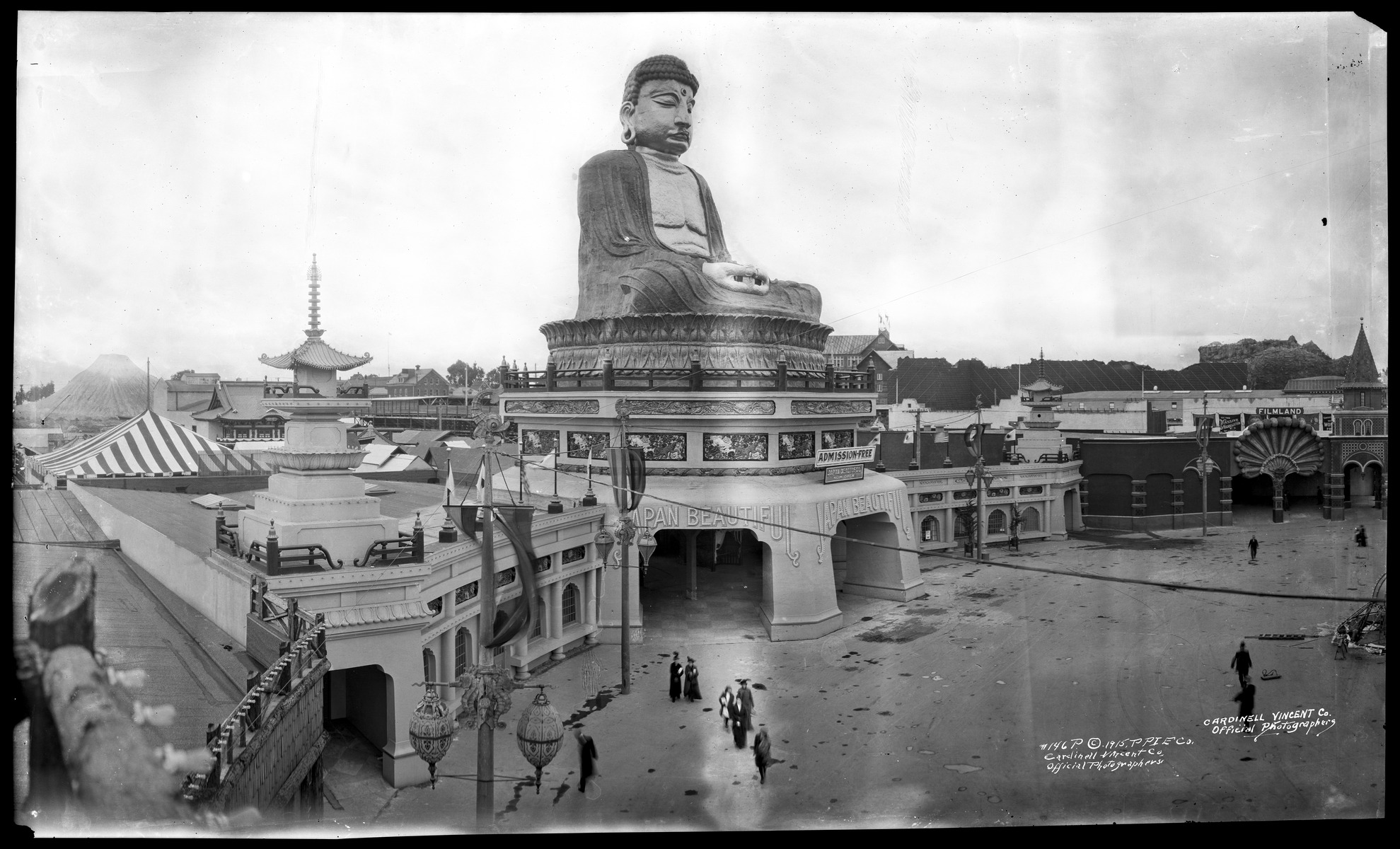
San Francisco (1915)

Two California cities, San Diego and San Francisco, proposed expositions celebrating the 1914 opening of the Panama Canal. San Francisco, a much larger city, won federal and state support, but San Diego pushed on by raising private funding. The resulting similarly-titled Panama–Pacific International Exposition and Panama–California Exposition ran simultaneously for most of 1915. Kushibiki helped organize the San Francisco Exposition, assisted by a $50,000 subsidy from the Japanese Government.

The Panama–Pacific International Exposition took place in what is now San Francisco's Marina District. Most of its buildings and grounds, including Kushibiki's Japanese installations, were subsequently dismantled, among them, replicas of the Great Buddha of Kamakura and the Kinkakuji temple at Kyoto. But several structures, including a pagoda and a temple gate, were moved to the Japanese Tea Garden in Golden Gate Park created for the California Midwinter International Exposition of 1894, which still remains in operation.

== American legacy ==
The impact of the work of Kushibiki and Arai on American perceptions of Japan was enormous. Hundreds of millions of people visited the expositions they organized.

Parts of some of the buildings and gardens organized by Kushibiki and Arai are still in existence, though most have been lost due to age, fire, war, vandalism, and changing tastes. The gardens and tea-houses at Jackson Park, Chicago, Fairmount Park, Philadelphia, Golden Gate Park, San Francisco still bear traces of their work.

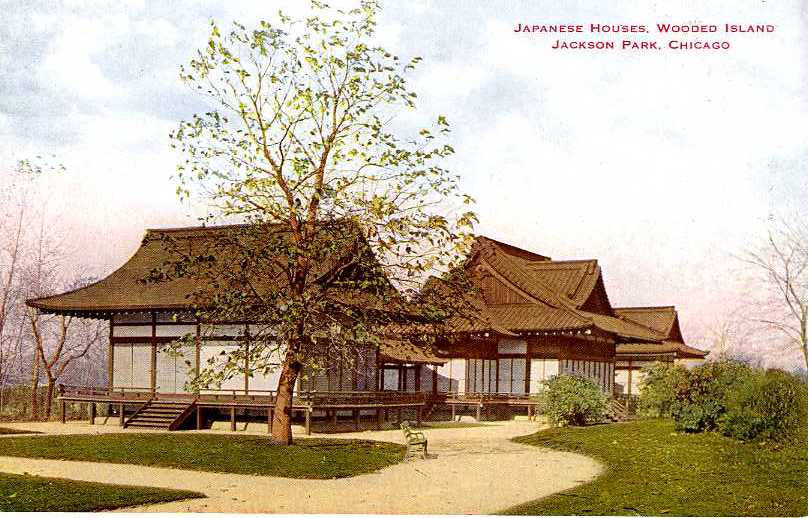
Jackson Park

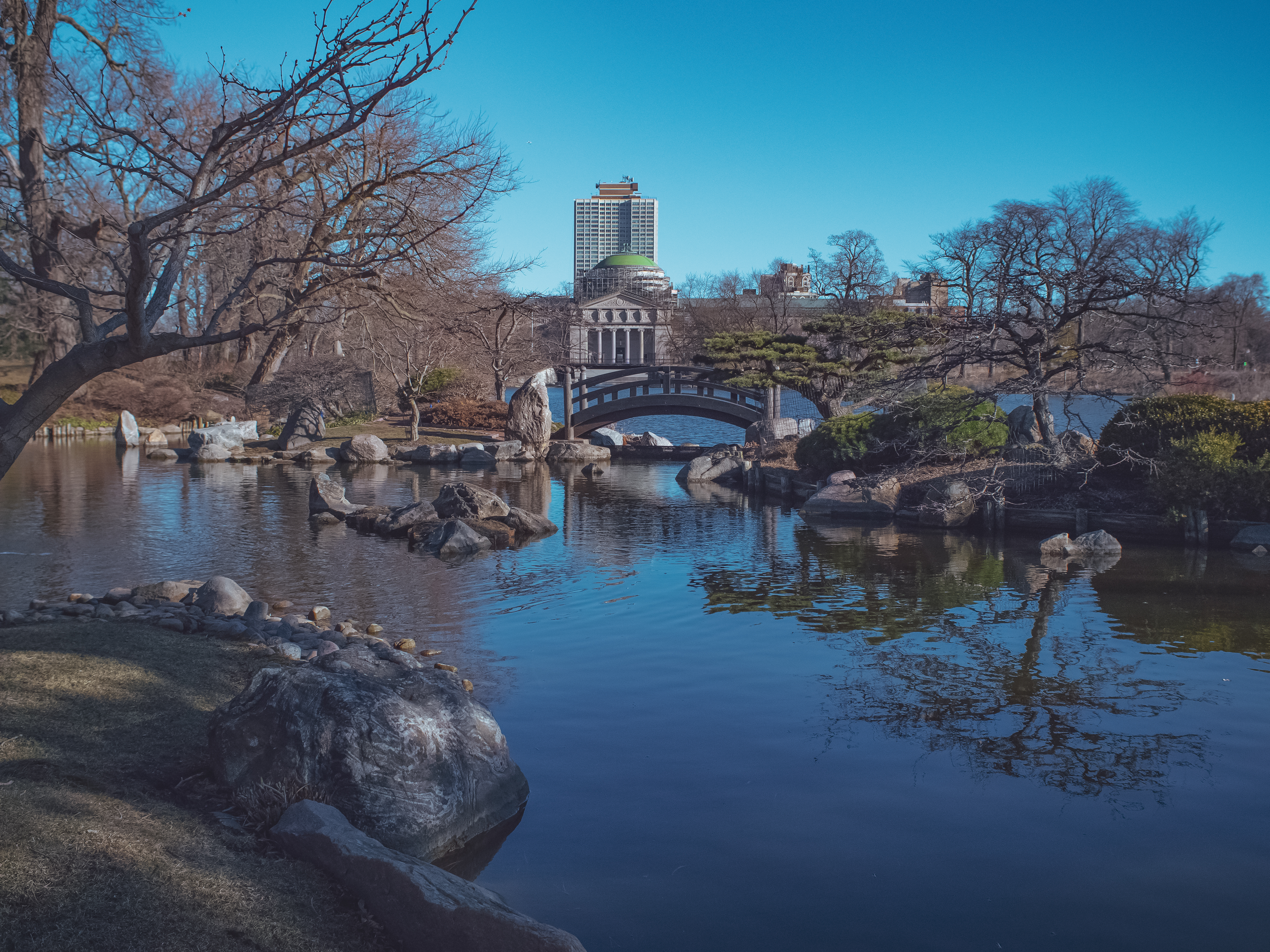
Jackson Park

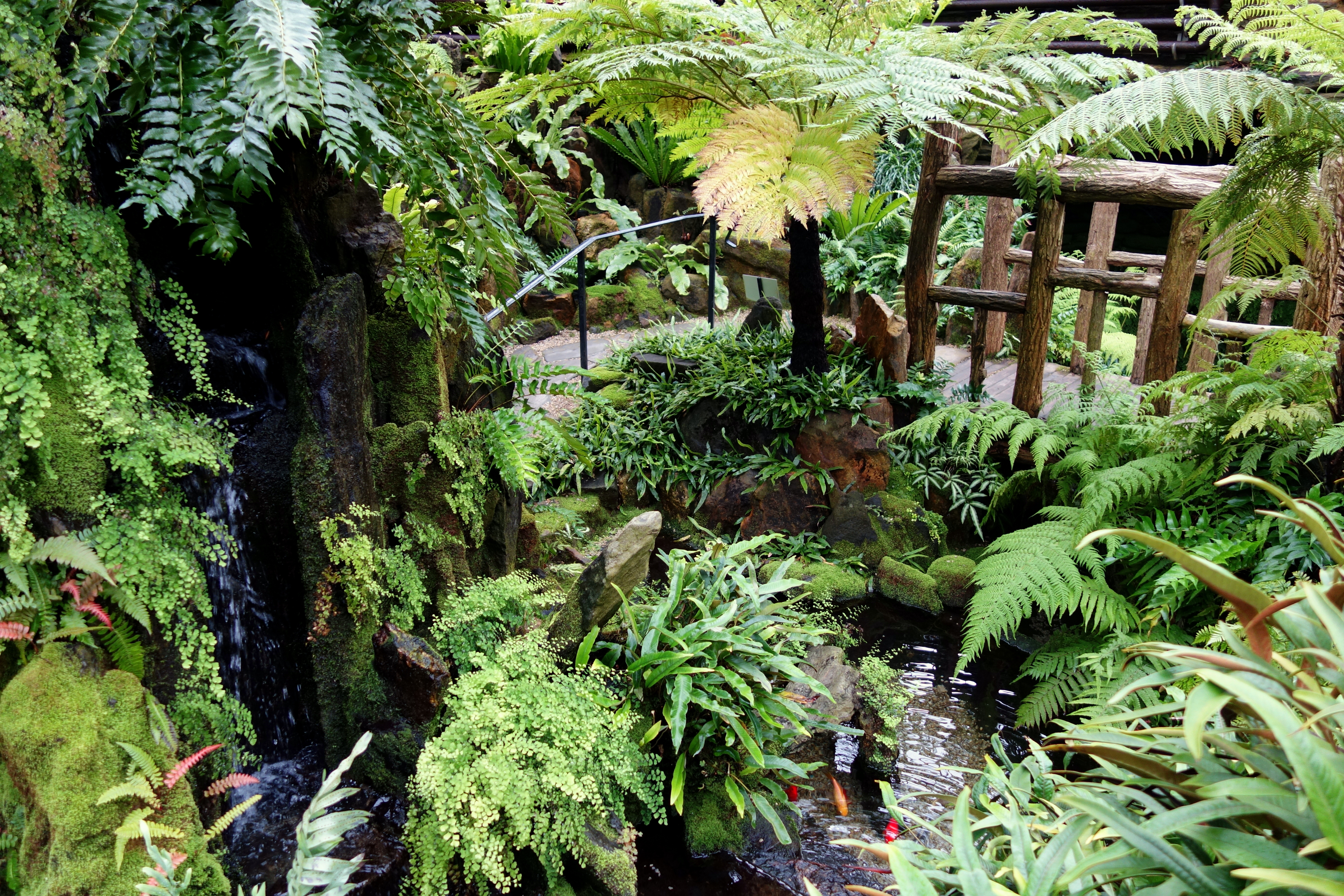
Morris Arboretum

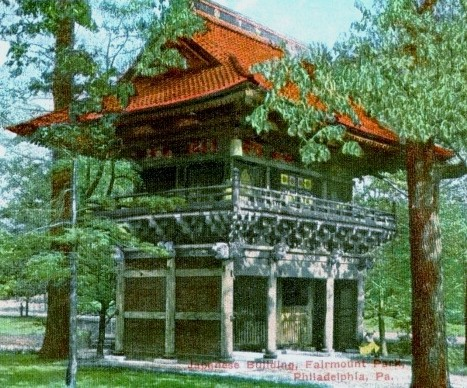
Fairmount Park

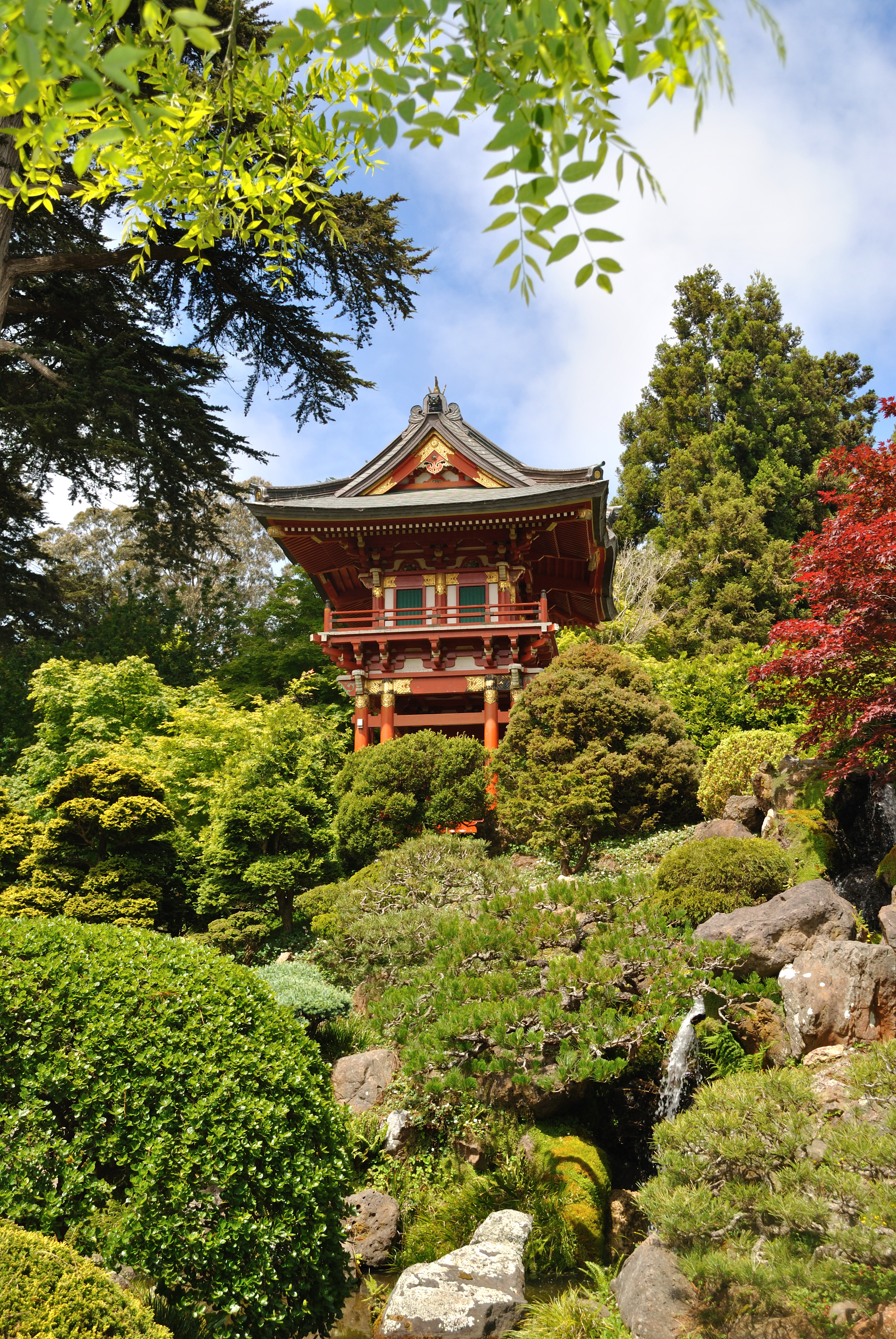
Golden Gate Park

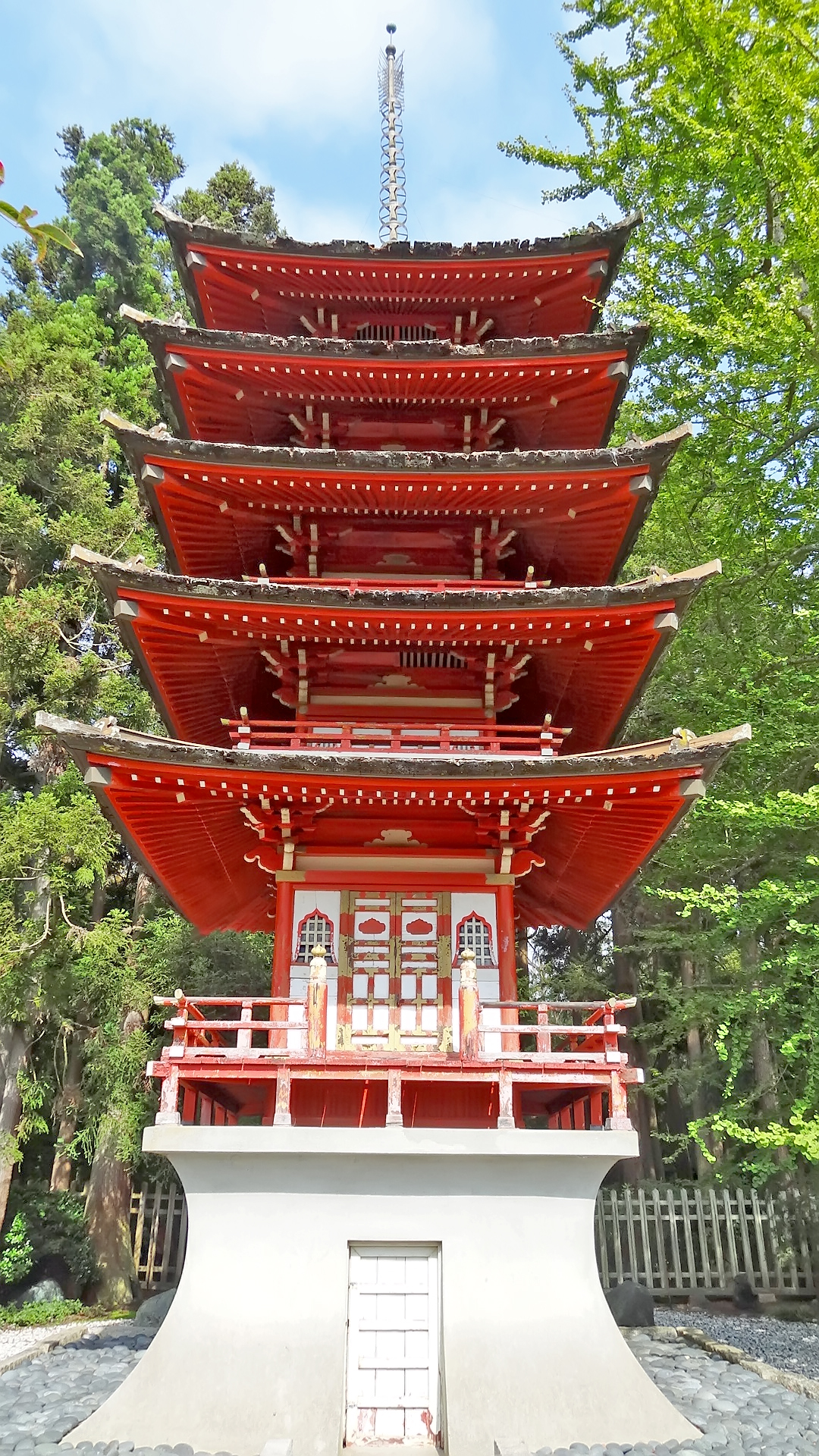
Golden Gate Park

== Last years in Japan ==
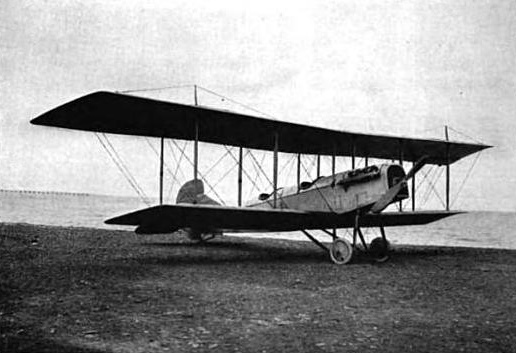
Curtiss 160 hp biplane (1918)

The California expositions marked the end of Kushibiki's American exposition organizing efforts. Returning to Japan, he reversed his usual strategy and sought to bring exotic American attractions such as aviators and famous baseball players to Japan. His success was limited. He served as manager for air shows by aviators Art Smith and Katherine Stinson in 1916-17. But a plan to bring Babe Ruth and the New York Giants to Japan in 1920 did not happen. Nor did a planned American tour for popular naniwabushi singer Yoshida Naramaru in 1917.

In 1920, the Japan Chronicle reported that "a man giving his name as Kushibiki Yumindo" was in talks with the city of Osaka about "a grand pleasure ground to be called the 'American Park.'" The editor concluded that "the report seems rather doubtful so far as its plans are concerned."

On July 28, 1924, the Nippu Jiji reported that "K. [sic] Kushibiki, a show man, well known among Americans and Japanese, died at Kamakura today." According to his obituary in the Japanese American Commercial Weekly, Kushibiki "was known in the United States, France, Italy and England as the 'Japanese Exposition King,' and was one of the first Japanese in America and Europe to introduce Japanese tea gardens and gardens." He was also "the first Japanese to introduce the Curtis aeroplane and the Edison moving picture machine in Japan."
