= Tsukiji-guchi Station =

Metro station in Nagoya, Japan

Coordinates: 35.0995°N 136.8830°E

E06 Tsukiji-guchi Station 築地口駅
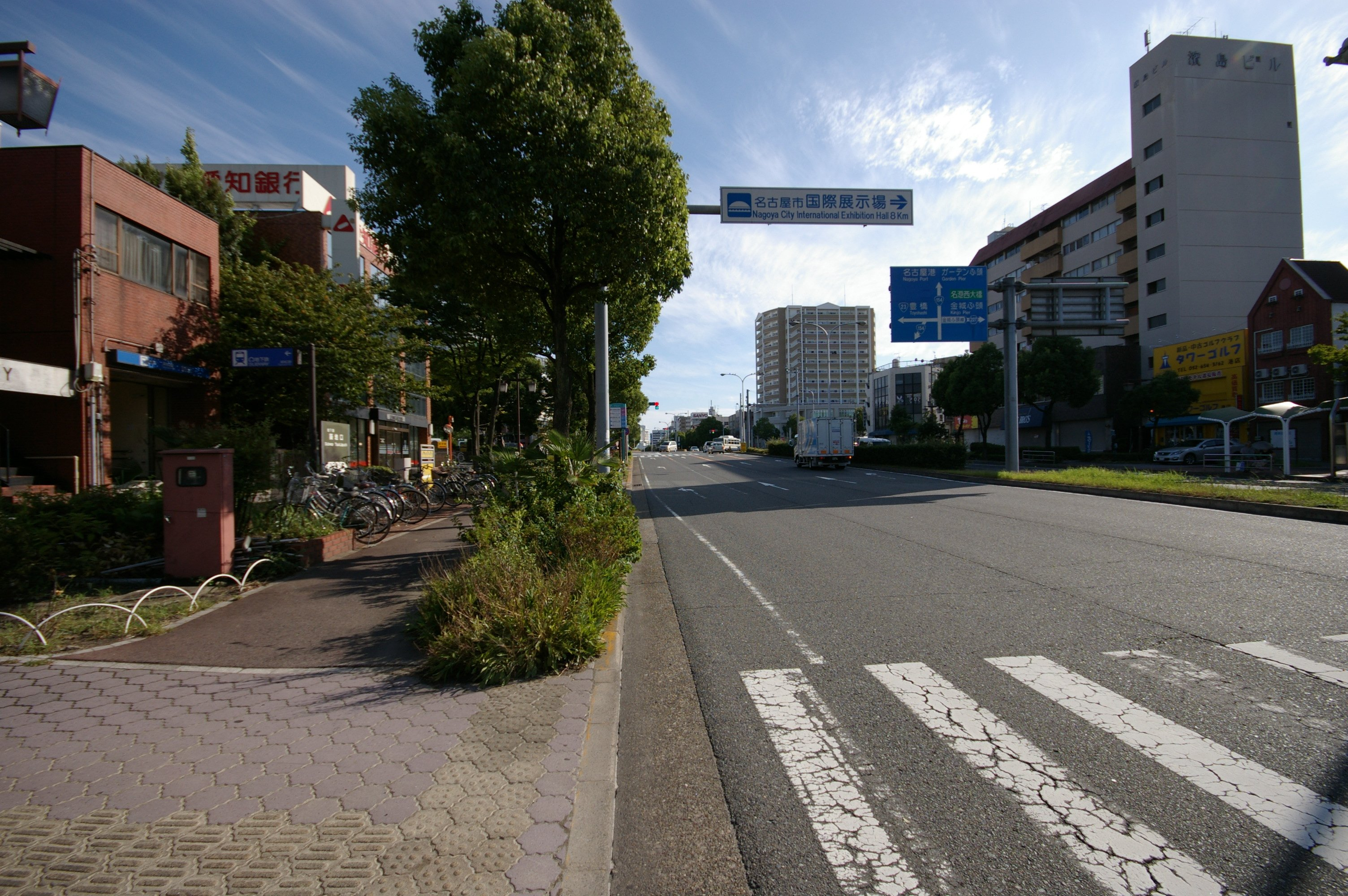
- Entrance number 1 and surrounding area

General information
- Location: 3-4-13 Kōraku, Minato, Nagoya, Aichi （名古屋市港区港楽三丁目4-13） Japan
- System: Nagoya Municipal Subway station
- Operator: Transportation Bureau City of Nagoya
- Line: Meikō Line
- Connections: Bus terminal

Other information
- Station code: E6

History
- Opened: 29 March 1971; 55 years ago

Passengers
- 2008: 2,038,146

Services
Preceding station	Nagoya Municipal Subway	Following station
Nagoyakō E07 Terminus	Meikō Line	Minato Kuyakusho E05 towards Kanayama
Location

Tsukiji-guchi Station (築地口駅, Tsukiji-guchi-eki) is an underground metro station located in Minato-ku, Nagoya, Aichi, Japan operated by the Nagoya Municipal Subway's Meikō Line. It is located 5.4 kilometers from the terminus of the Meikō Line at Kanayama Station.

== History ==
Tsukiji-guchi Station was opened on 29 March 1971.

== Lines ==
- Nagoya Municipal Subway
  - Meikō Line (Station E06)

== Layout ==
Tsukiji-guchi Station has two underground opposed side platforms.

=== Platforms ===
1	■ Meikō Line	For Nagoyakō
2	■ Meikō Line	For Kanayama, Sakae, and Ōzone

There is one set of gates, beyond which there are four exits. Each platform has an up escalator and an elevator. There are coin lockers near Exit 2. There are bathrooms near Exit 1 and Exit 4, and near Exit 2 and Exit 3. The bathroom near Exit 2 and 3, and the gates, is also handicapped-accessible and has a baby changing area. On Platform 1 for Nagoyakō Station, train door 3 is closest to elevator, door 4 is closest to the escalator, and doors 5 and 12 are closest to the stairs. On the opposite platform, Platform 2 for Kanayama Station, train door 14 is closest to the elevator and doors 6 and 13 are closest to the stairs.

== See also ==
- Tsukiji Shrine
