= Port of Nagoya Public Aquarium =

Port of Nagoya Public Aquarium 名古屋港水族館
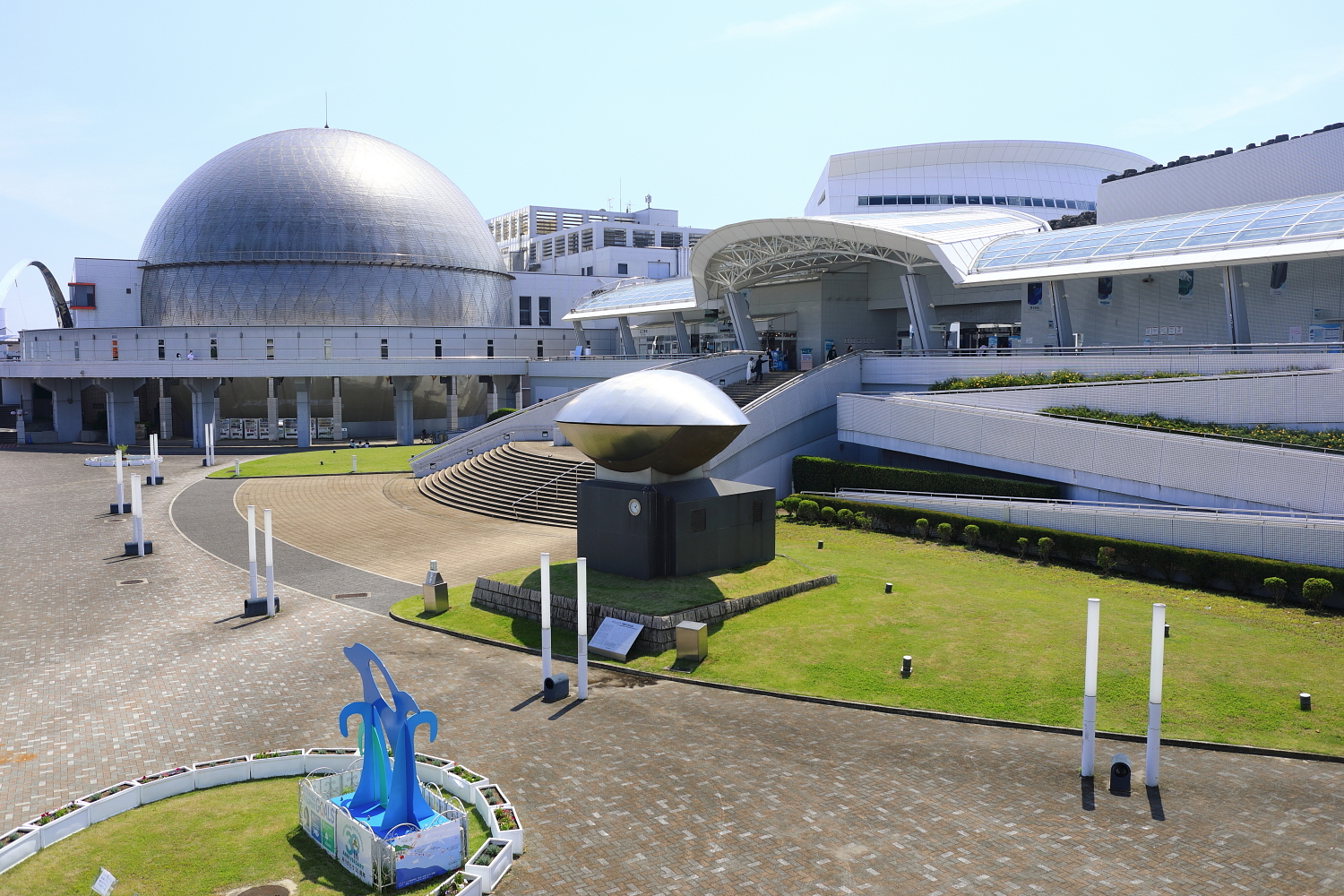
- Exterior in 2022
- Interactive map of Port of Nagoya Public Aquarium 名古屋港水族館
- 35.0906°N 136.8782°E
- Date opened: October 1992
- Location: Minato-ku, Nagoya
- Land area: 41,529 m^{2} (447,010 sq ft)
- No. of animals: 50,000
- No. of species: 500
- Volume of largest tank: 13,400,000 litres (3,540,000 US gal)
- Total volume of tanks: 27,000,000 litres (7,133,000 US gal)
- Annual visitors: 2.2 million (2017)
- Memberships: JAZA
- Major exhibits: Whale (North Building), Equatorial sea tank (South Building)
- Management: Nagoya Minato Promotion Foundation
- Website: English website

The Port of Nagoya Public Aquarium (Japanese: 名古屋港水族館, Hepburn: Nagoyakō Suizokukan) is a public aquarium in Minato-ku, Nagoya, Aichi Prefecture, Japan.

It is a member of the Japanese Association of Zoos and Aquariums (JAZA), and is the public aquarium with the largest tank capacity and total area in Japan. It also contains Japan's largest dolphin show tank. The aquarium is accredited as a museum-equivalent facility under the Museum Act by the Ministry of Education, Culture, Sports, Science and Technology.

== History ==
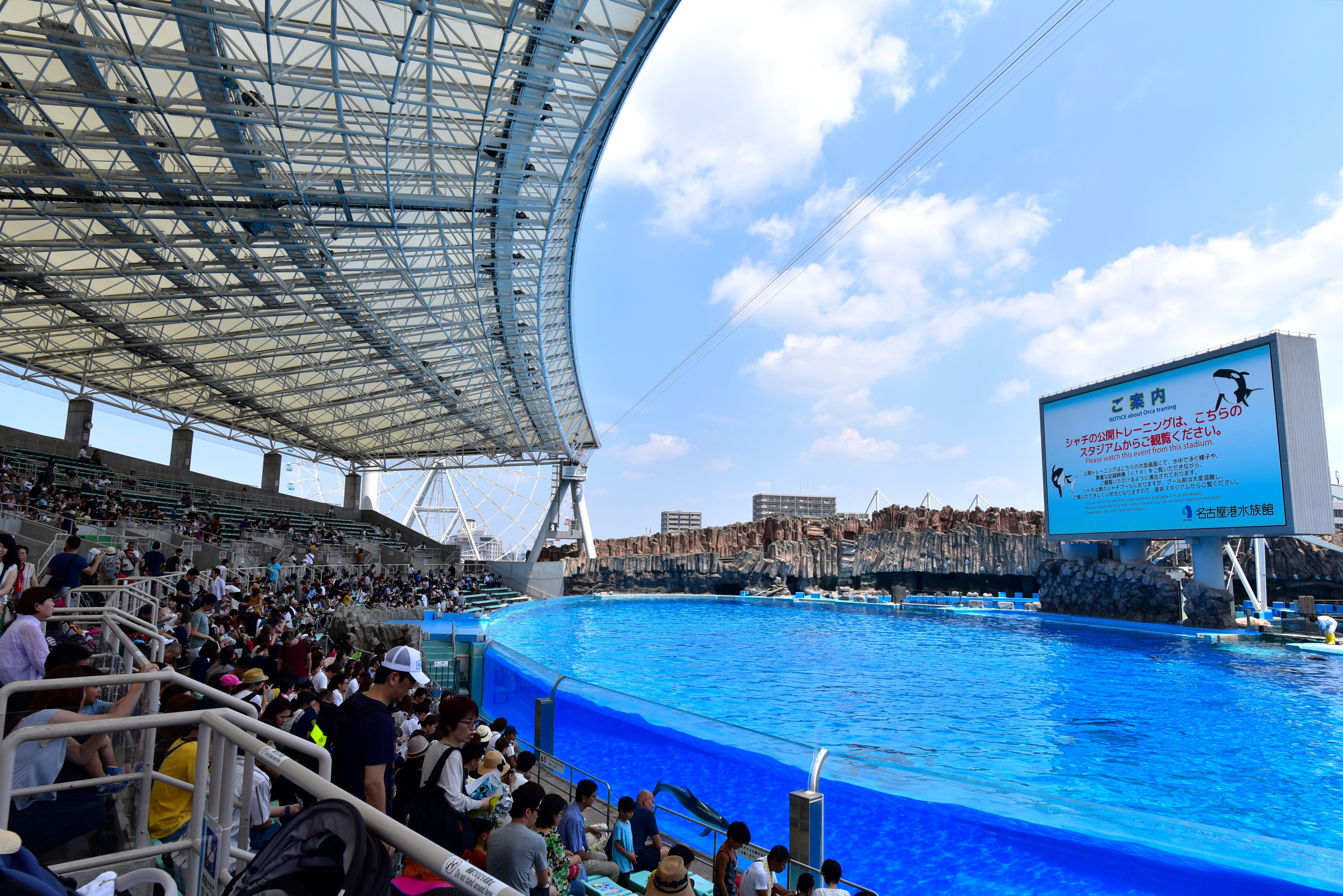
Japan's largest (13,500,000 litres (3,566,000 US gal)) dolphin show tank

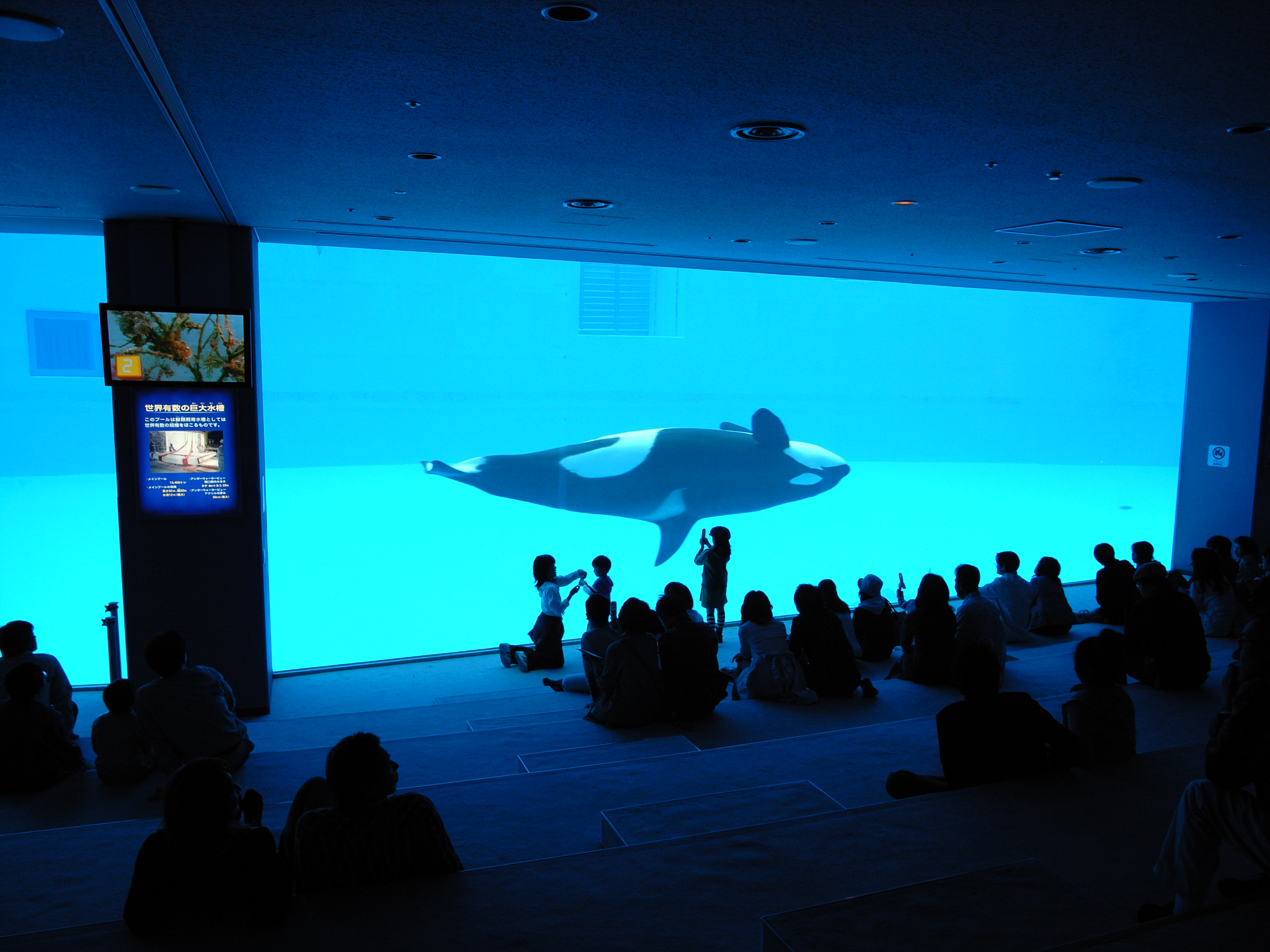
A dolphin show tank seen from the in water. The acrylic glass is 4 metres (13 ft) high and 29 metres (95 ft) wide.

Opened in 1992, the Port of Nagoya Public Aquarium is a public aquarium operated by Nagoya Minato Promotion Foundation.

When the aquarium first opened, the exhibition theme was "Journey from Japan to Antarctica", and the exhibits were themed around five bodies of water in the order of "Japanese Sea", "Japanese Deep Sea", "Equatorial Sea", "Australia", and "Antarctica", following the route once taken by the Antarctic ship Fuji, which is permanently anchored in the Port of Nagoya. Since the opening of the museum, more emphasis has been placed on the protection of turtles, and a "Turtle Breeding Research Center" has been established. 99% of the seawater used in the aquarium is pumped from the sea at the Port of Nagoya.

In 2001, the aquarium built a new facility, including a 60 m (200 ft) wide, 30 m (98 ft) long, 13,500,000 litres (3,566,000 US gal) show pool, with a water depth of 12 m (39 ft). When it opened, it was the largest dolphin show tank in the world.

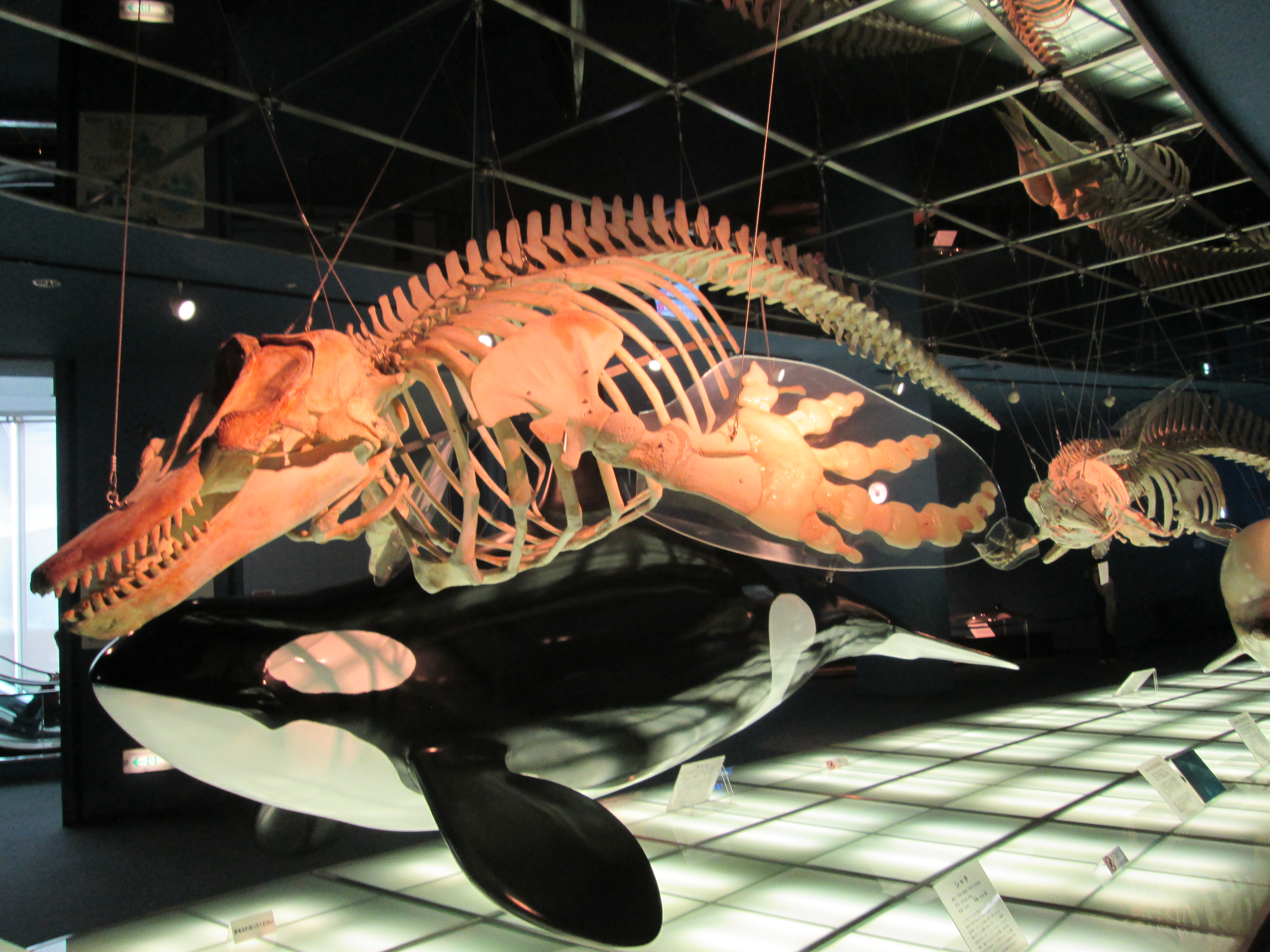
On the second floor of the North Wing is a museum dedicated to the evolution of whales called "Evolutionary Sea".

The exhibition theme of the North Wing is "3.5 Billion Year Journey: Animals Return to the Sea Again". For this reason, the second floor of the North Building houses a museum "Evolutionary Sea" on the evolution of whales, with the largest number of fossil replicas and skeletal specimens of whales in Japan. Fossils of Pakicetus and other whales that existed on land are on display, as well as the skeletons of killer whales and beluga whales that were bred at the Nagoya Port Aquarium in the past.

In 2015, a shark ray that accidentally ate a puffer fish survived and attracted a lot of attention. The aquarium offers tooth brushing for skinship with Grouper.

The total number of visitors to the aquarium was approximately 55 million as of 2021, and the annual number of visitors has remained stable at over 2 million.

Since 2020, an environmental education room with a display of microplastics collected at the Port of Nagoya has been open to the public on the third floor of the South Building.

== Research and conservation ==
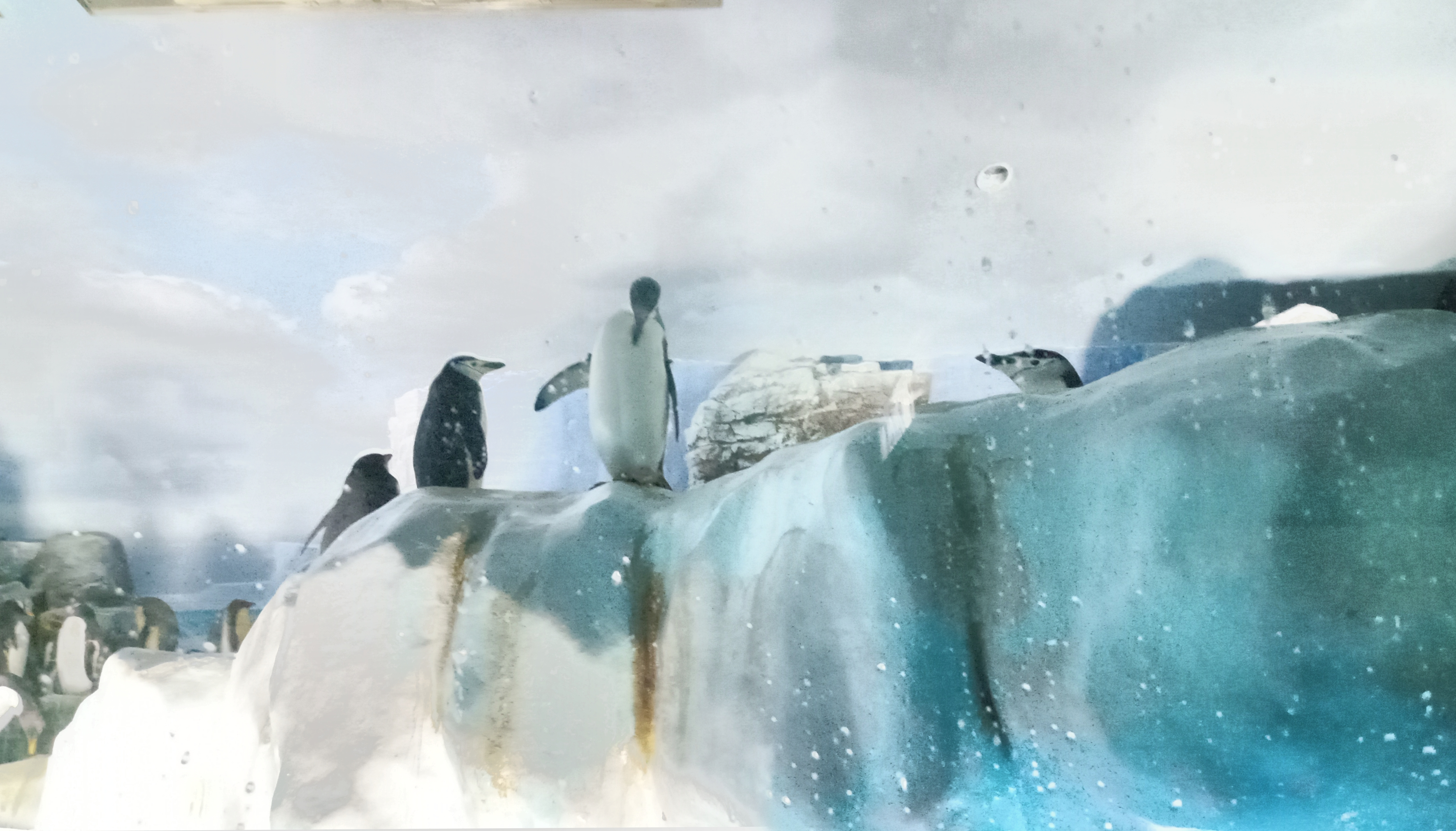
There are 164 penguins, including four species that live around Antarctica Adelie penguins, bearded penguins, gentoo penguins, and emperor penguins.

Since its opening, the Port of Nagoya Aquarium has received multiple breeding and Koga awards from JAZA. The Port of Nagoya Aquarium has been active in breeding Antarctic species, having received awards for total 18 different animals.

- Sea turtles

In 1995, the artificial hatching of loggerhead turtles was successful, and was the first in Japan to be laid at an indoor artificial spawning ground.
Since 2003, in collaboration with the US National Oceanic and Atmospheric Administration (NOAA), young loggerhead turtles have been tagged and released, to research migratory routes in the North Pacific using an artificial satellite tracking system. In addition, loggerhead turtles have been successfully bred for two generations. this won the Koga award from the Japanese Association of Zoos and Aquariums (JAZA).

- Penguins

There is also a breeding research facility for penguins. Gentoo penguins, chinstrap penguins and Adelie penguins have been successfully bred. This won an award from JAZA. The aquarium has also successfully hatched emperor penguins.

- Beluga whales

On July 17, 2004, the beluga whale named Mama gave birth. This was the first beluga whale born in captivity in Japan. Further births, by various whales, happened in 2007, 2010, and 2012.

- Finless porpoise

Although the Port of Nagoya Aquarium does not breed finless porpoise, many wild finless porpoises visit the Port of Nagoya every winter and spring. The aquarium is collaborating with several universities, including Kyoto University and Tokai University, to study the behavior patterns of the finless porpoise and how the Port of Nagoya is used by them.

- Orca reproductive physiology research and environmental enrichment

On November 13, 2012, the orca named Stella gave birth to a female, the first orca born at the Port of Nagoya Public Aquarium.

=== Killer Whales ===
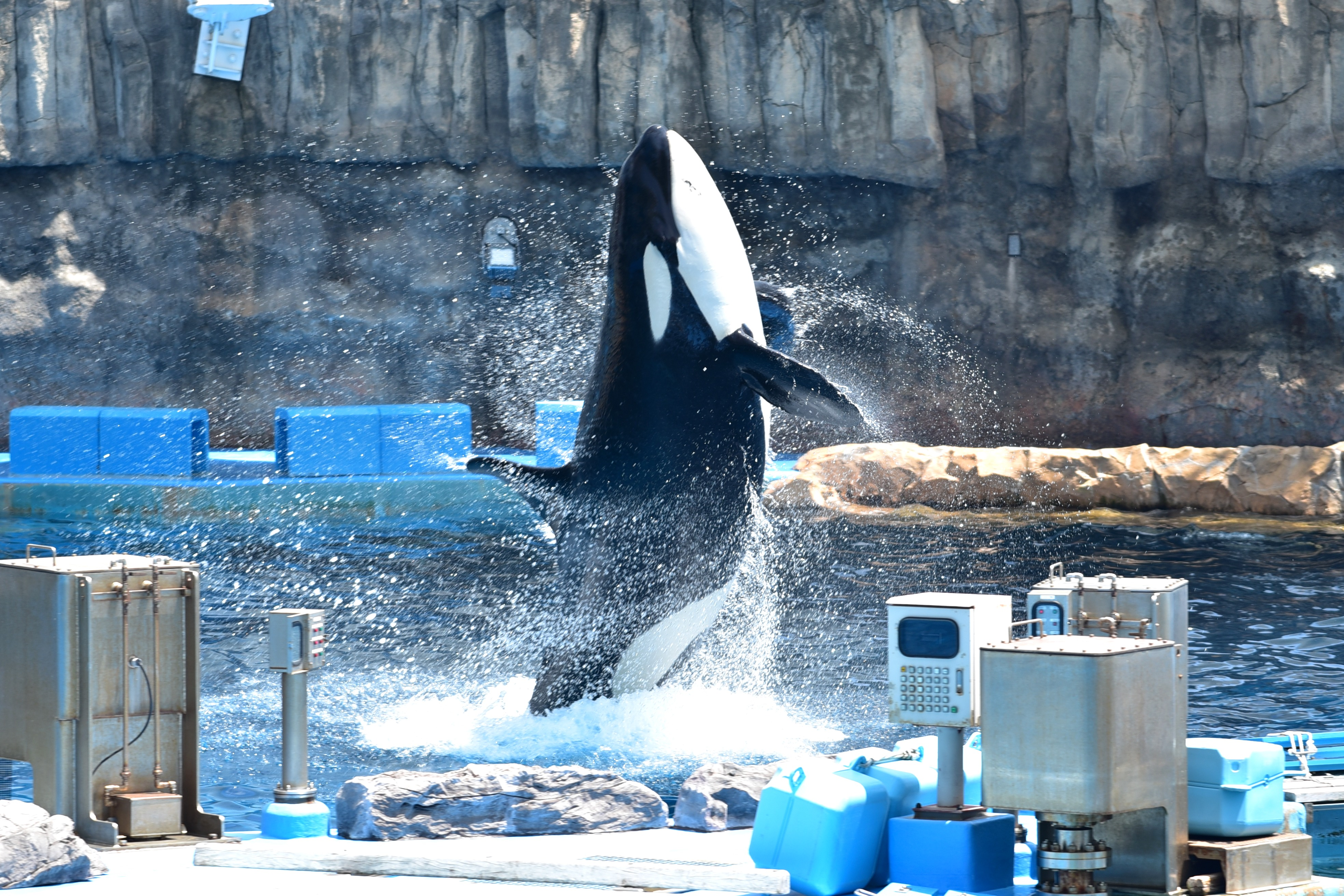
A killer whale training. The curriculum is designed to prevent physical inactivity and takes place 4 times a day.

Killer whale captivity began in October 2003 with Kū, followed by Nami, Stella, Bingo and Ran, and on November 13, 2012, Stella's calves were born.

Since December 2015, three orcas, Stella, Lynn and Earth are being kept at the aquarium. All killer whales kept in Japan have been made up of relatives since the death of Nami in January 2011, and only Stella and her grandchildren since the death of Bingo in August 2014. Bingo is the largest killer whale in Japan that has ever been kept in captivity with a total length of over 6.5 m (21 ft). Earth is 5.7 m (19 ft) long and weighs 2,600 kg (5,700 lb) as of 2021, making him the largest living killer whale in Japan in captivity. The aquarium weighs the orcas four times a month and adjusts the amount of food they receive.

The aquarium is collaborating with the Primate Research Institute of Kyoto University to conduct comparative cognitive science research on killer whales.

- Kū

Since 2003, the aquarium kept a killer whale named Kū (クー) on loan from another aquarium; she lived at the aquarium until her death on September 19, 2008.

- Nami

In 2010, the aquarium acquired a killer whale named Nami (ナミちゃん, nami-chan), who was to live at the aquarium permanently and feature in its Orca Show. Nami died shortly after her arrival and public debut at this aquarium, dying on January 14, 2011.

- Bingo and Stella

Plans were made in January or February 2011 for the aquarium to receive two killer whales, a male, Bingo, and a female, Stella, on a five-year loan from Kamogawa Sea World in Chiba Prefecture.

The two adult killer whales arrived on December 16, 2011, by ship. Their daughter, Ran 2, arrived by truck the day before, on December 15, 2011. On November 13, 2012, Stella gave birth to a female calf, Lynn.

Bingo died on August 2, 2014, after suffering an illness. Stella is still alive and currently lives at Kobe Suma Sea World while her daughter Lynn and her grandson Earth lives in Port of Nagoya Public Aquarium.

=== Family structure ===
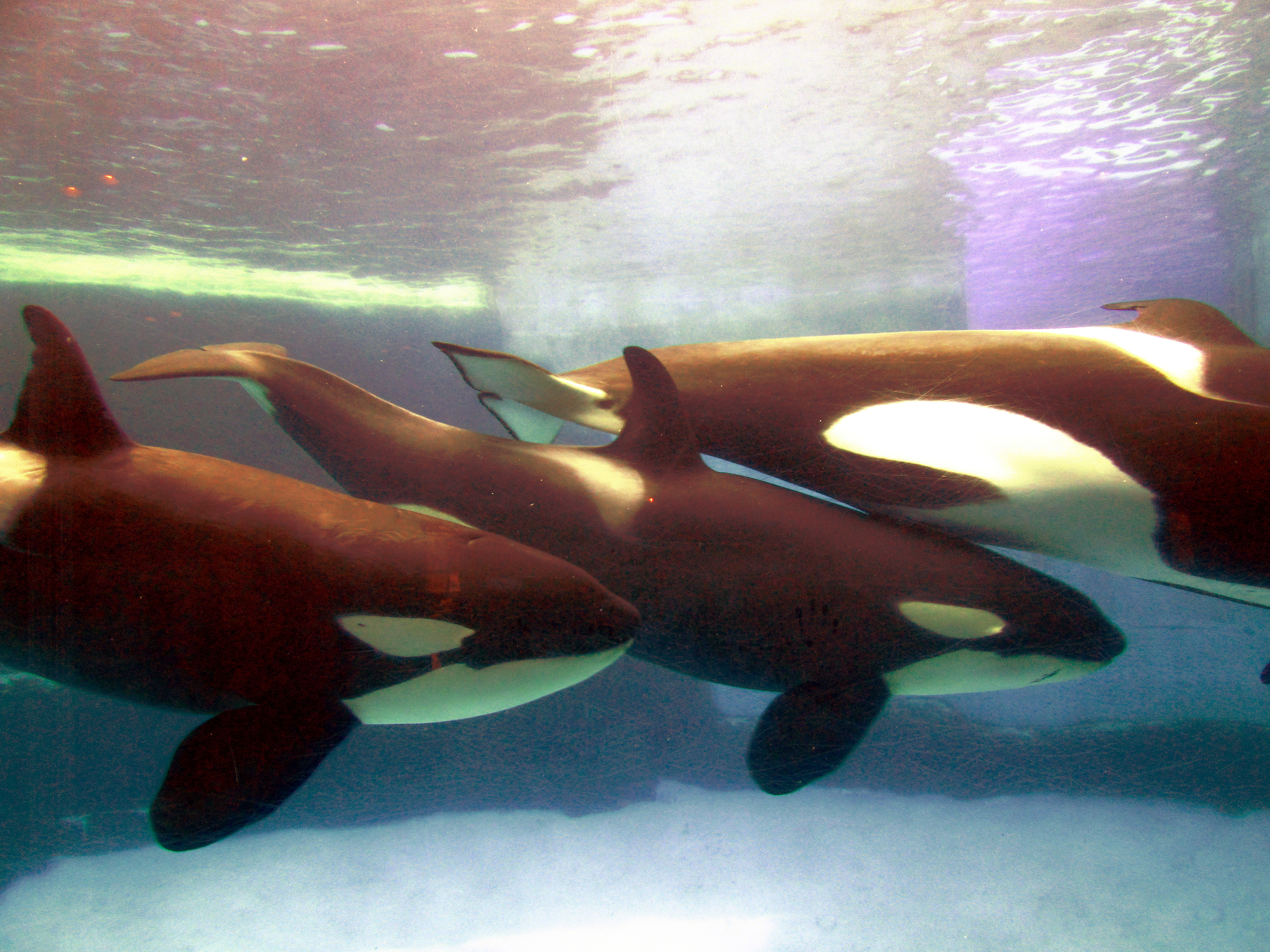
Killer whale family "Earth", "Lynn", and "Stella" living in the Port of Nagoya Public Aquarium

- Father Bingo – Captured in Iceland in 1984 – Died at the Port of Nagoya Public Aquarium on August 2, 2014 (estimated 32 years old)
- Mother Stella – Captured in Iceland in 1987 and formerly Rearing in the Port of Nagoya Public Aquarium Now living in Kobe Suma Sea World from 29 March 2024
  - Eldest daughter Rabbie – January 11, 1998 – Born at Kamogawa Sea World
  - Lovey's husband Oscar – Captured in Iceland in 1987 – Died at Kamogawa Sea World on December 20, 2012 (estimated 27 years old)
    - Lovey's eldest son Earth – October 13, 2008 – Born at the Port of Nagoya Public Aquarium
    - Lovey's eldest daughter Luna – July 19, 2012 – Born at Kamogawa Sea World
  - Second daughter Lara – February 8, 2001– Born at Kamogawa Sea World
  - Sarah, the third daughter – May 31, 2003 - Died at Kamogawa Sea World on April 26, 2006 (2 years and 10 months)
  - Ran 2, fourth daughter – February 25, 2006 - Born at Kamogawa Sea World
  - Lynn, fifth daughter – November 13, 2012 – Born at the Port of Nagoya Public Aquarium

== Facilities ==
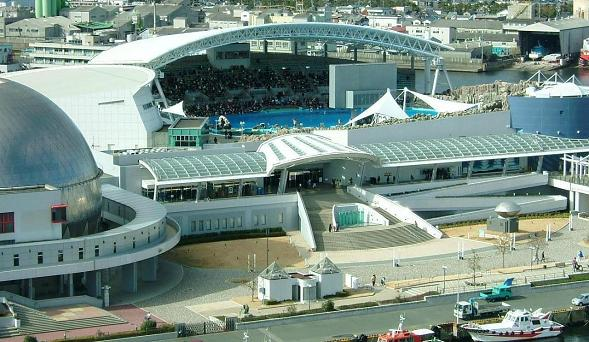
North Building from the sky

=== North building ===
- Japanese sea
- Aurora sea
- Sea of evolution
- Underwater bleachers
- Main pool
- Aurora sea

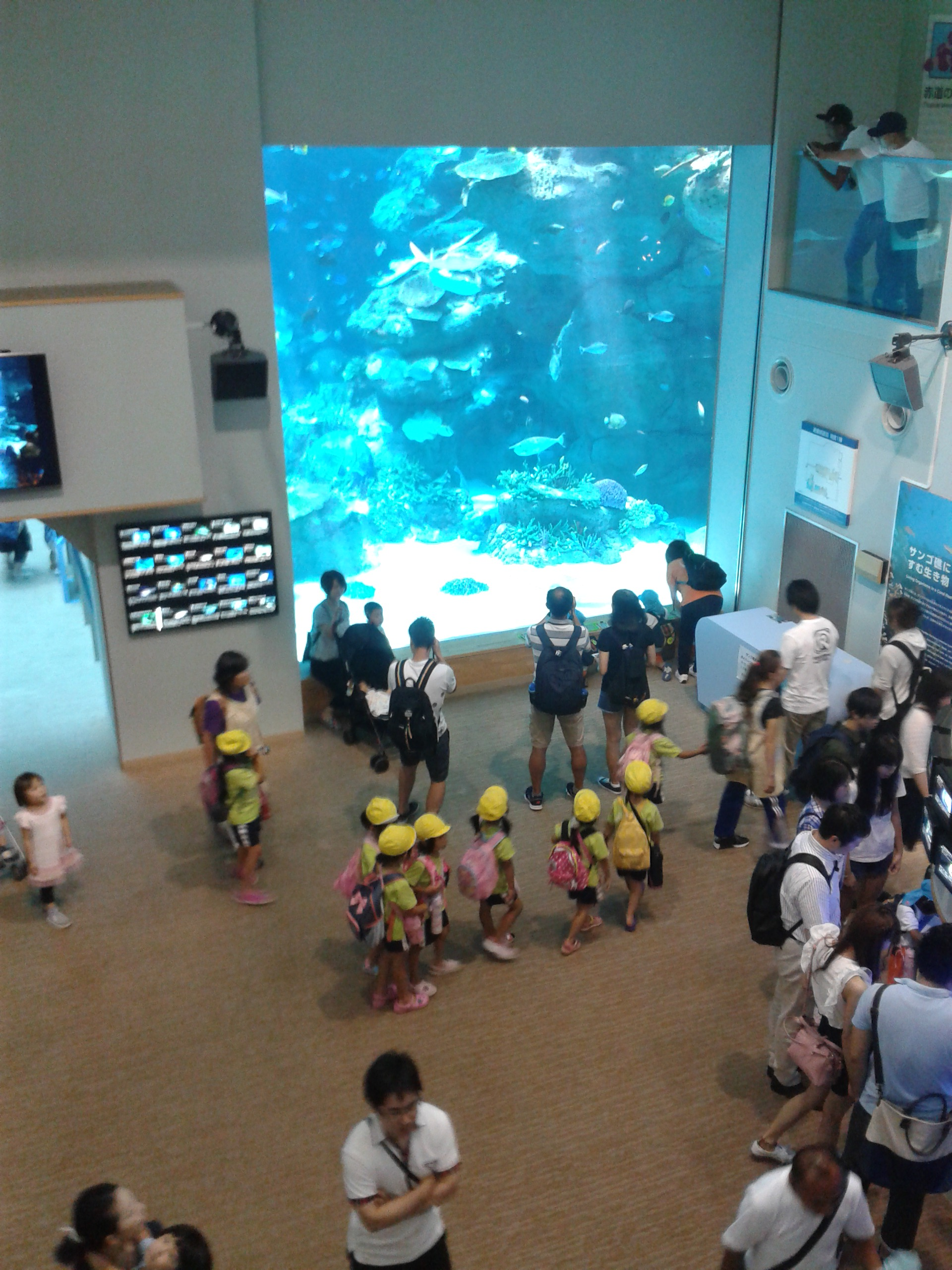
Water tanks in the South Building, which is an atrium

=== South building ===
- Japanese sea
- Large Kuroshio Tank
- Deep sea gallery
- Equatorial sea
- Sea turtle migration tank
- Australian waterside
- Antarctic ocean
- Jerry Fish Nagori Umu
- Touch tank

There is also a cinema and a turtle breeding research facility.

== Gallery ==
Exterior

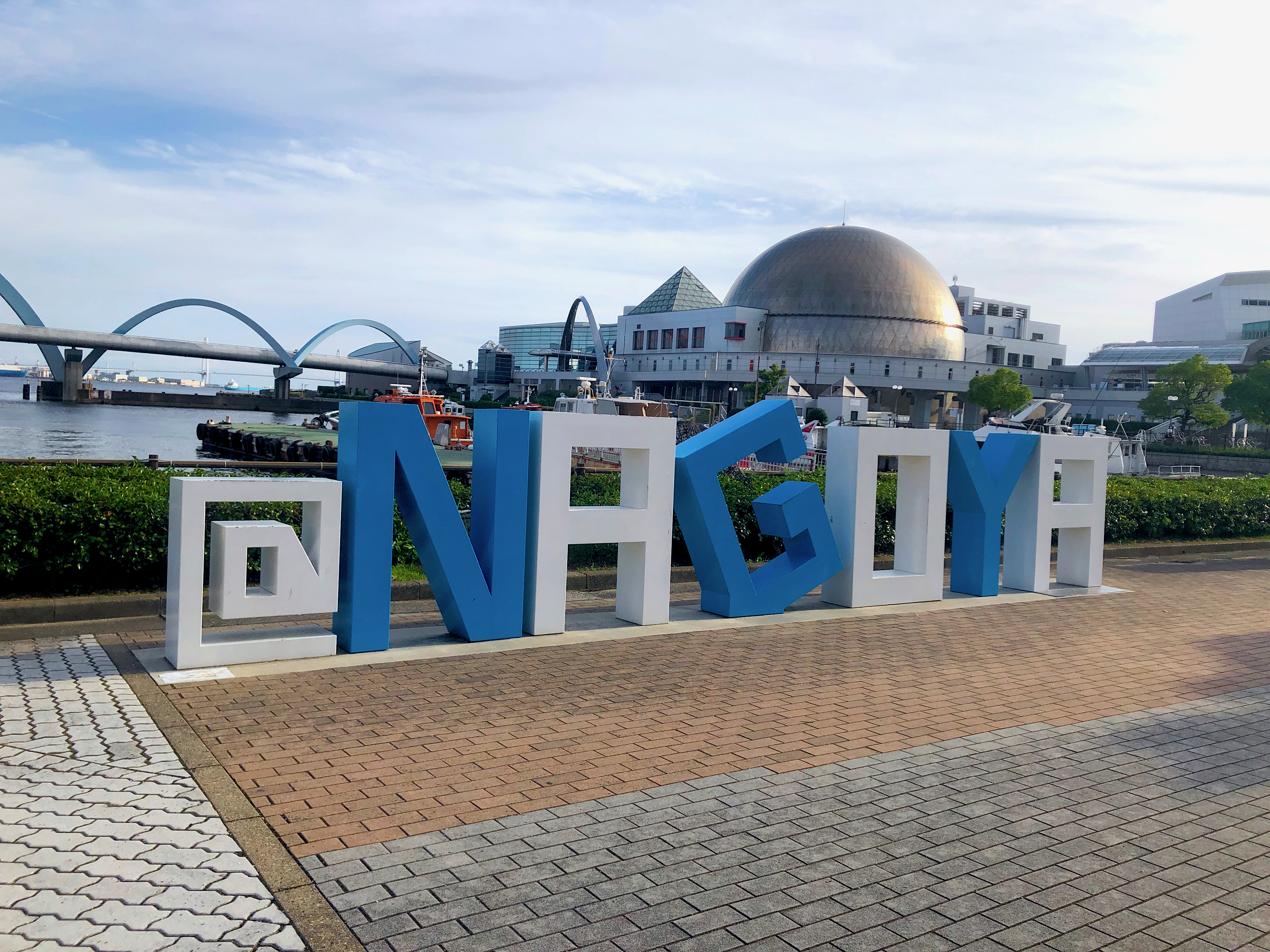

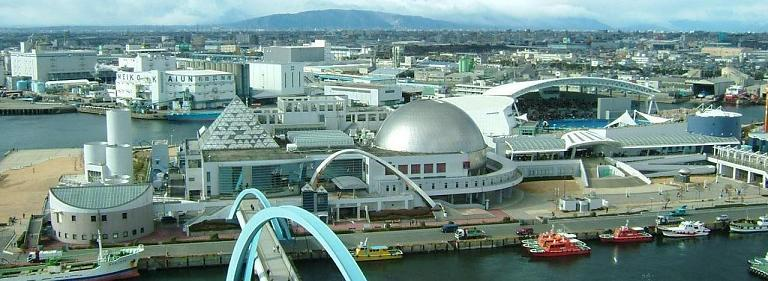

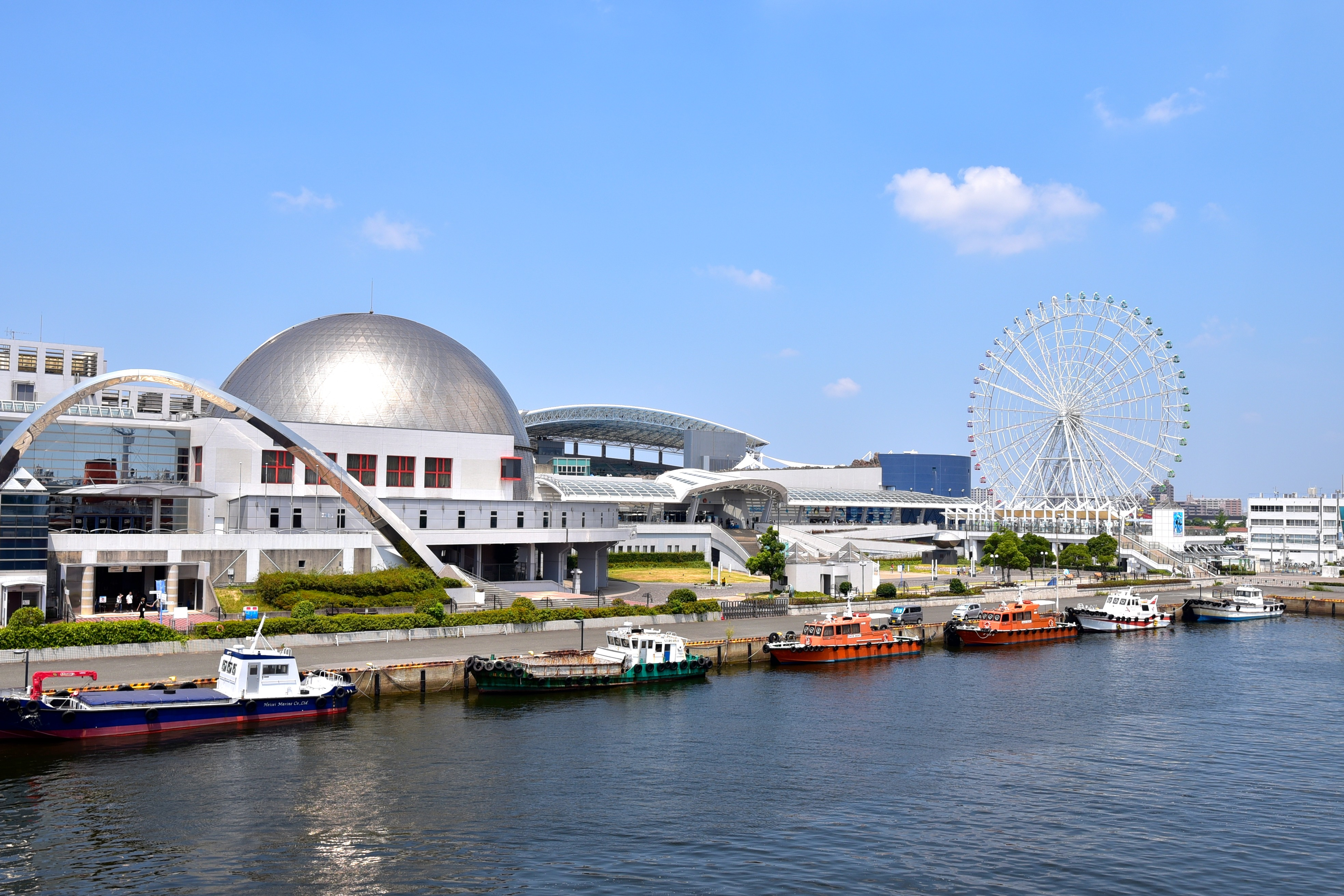

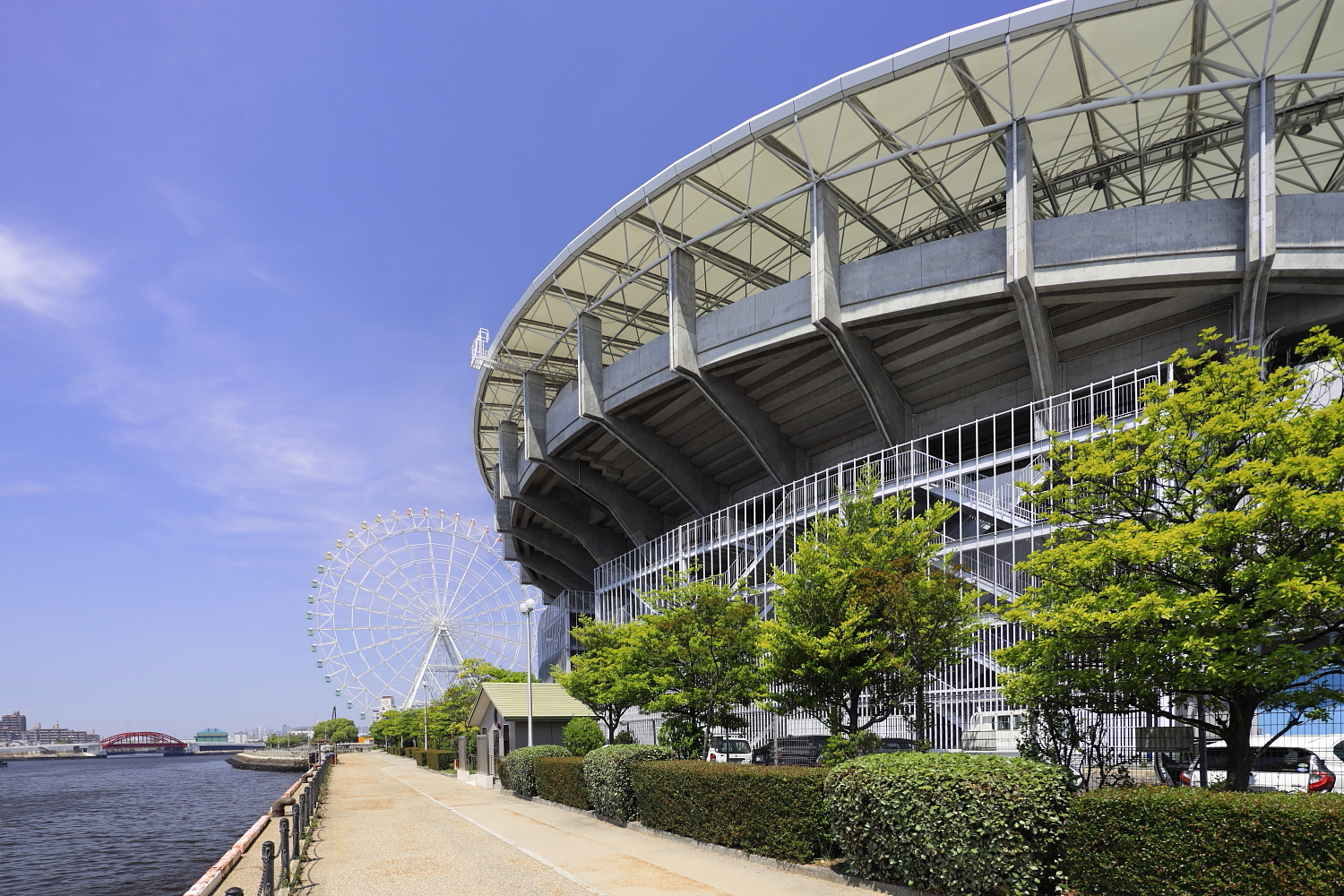

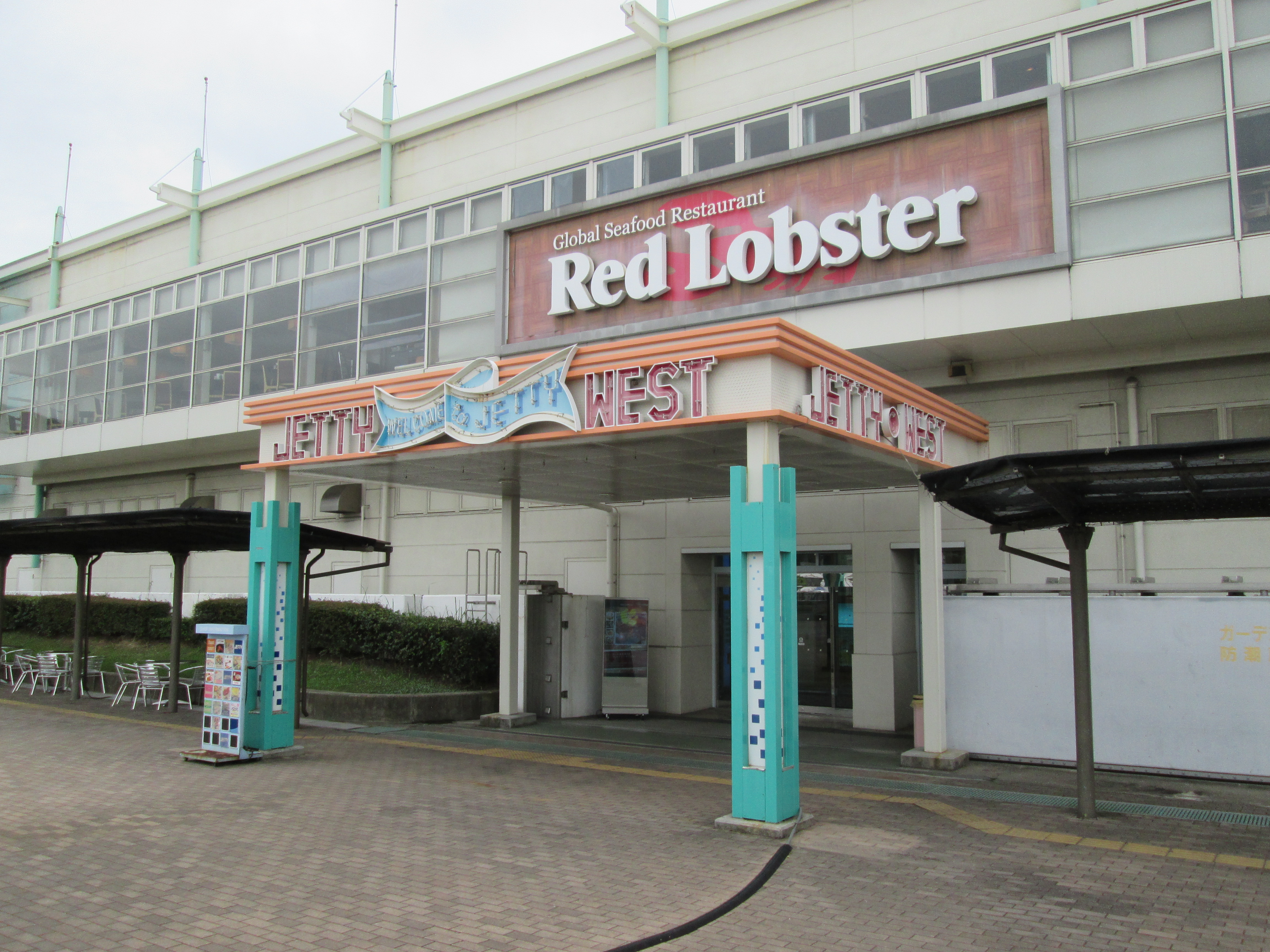

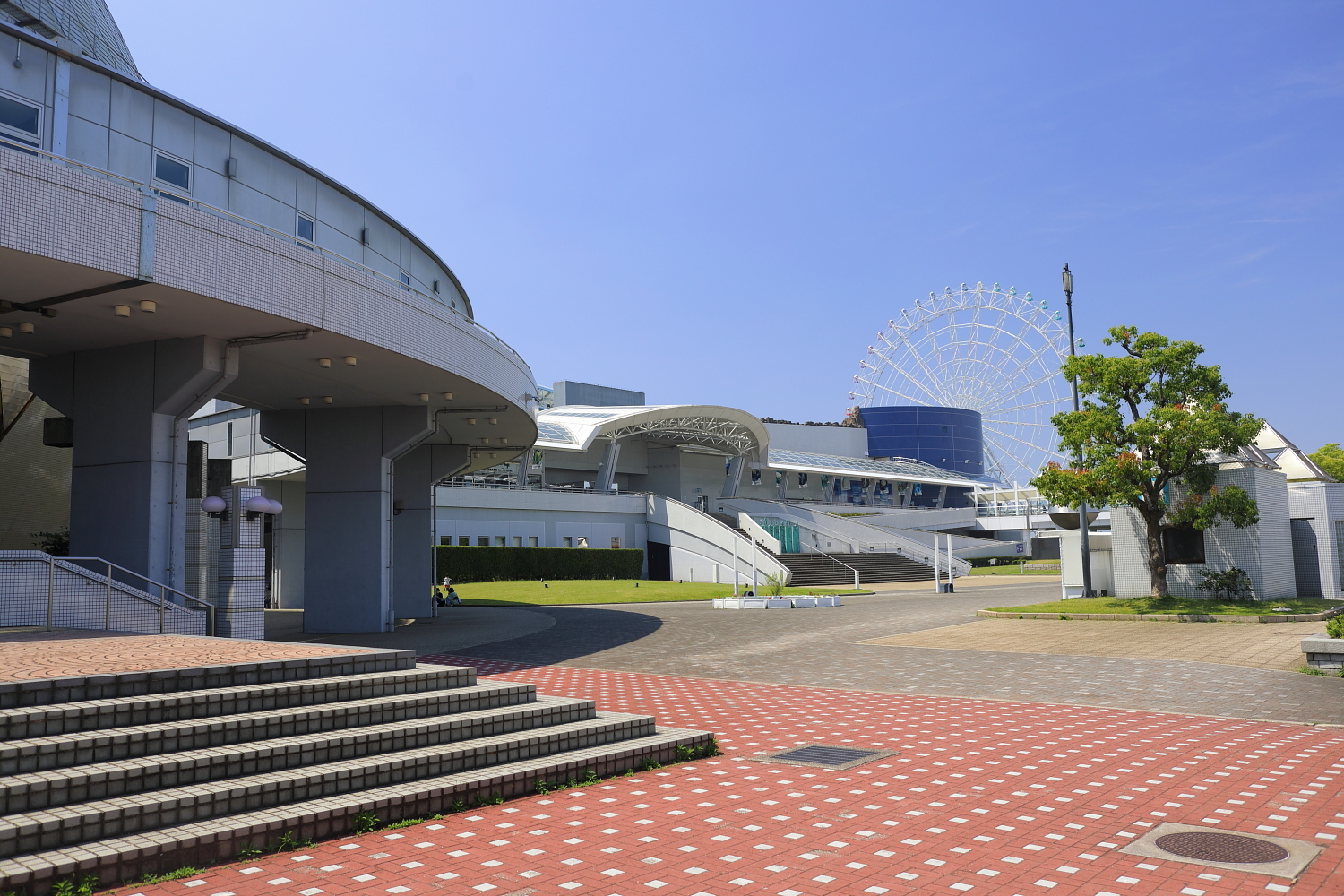

Animals

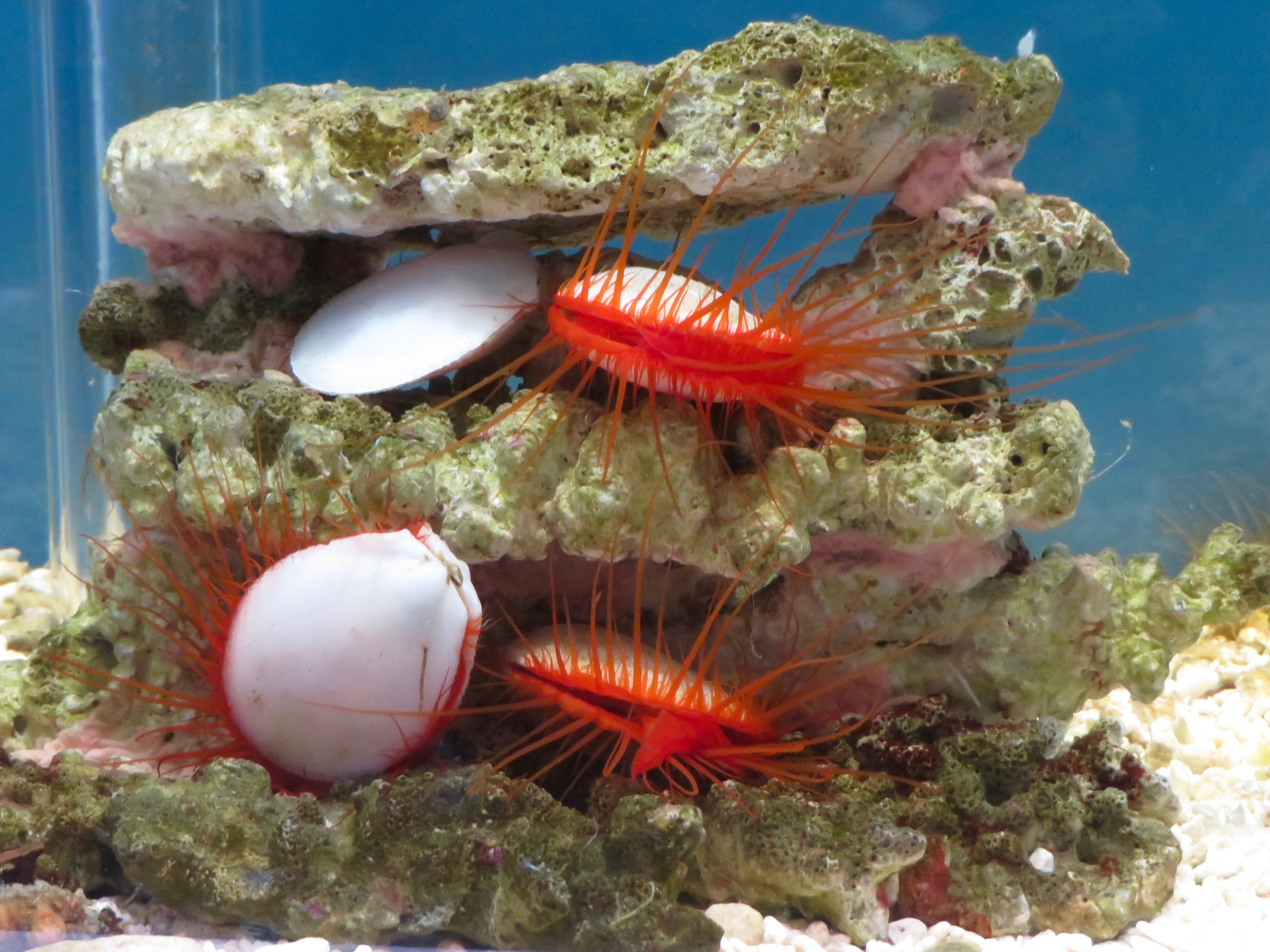

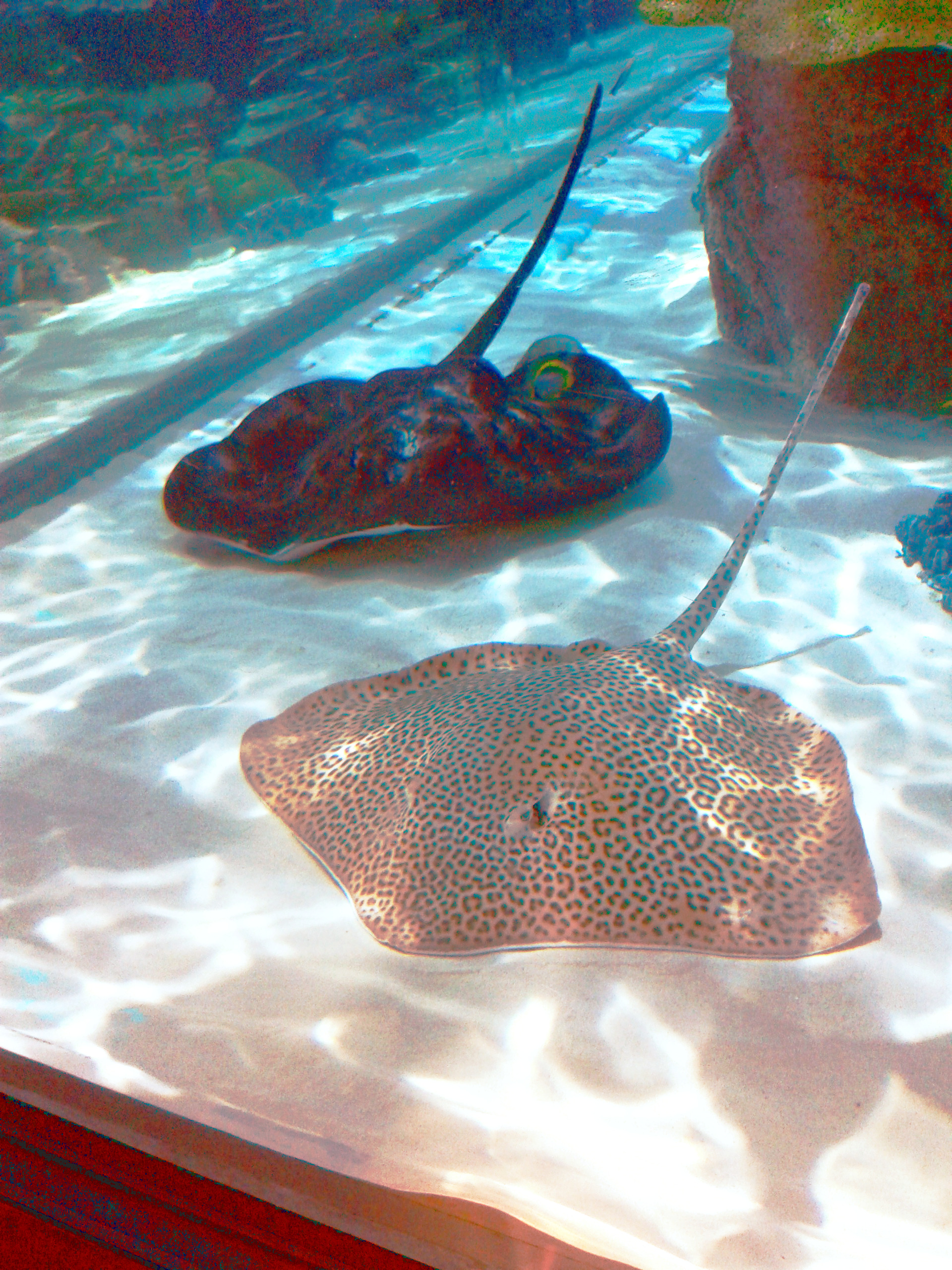

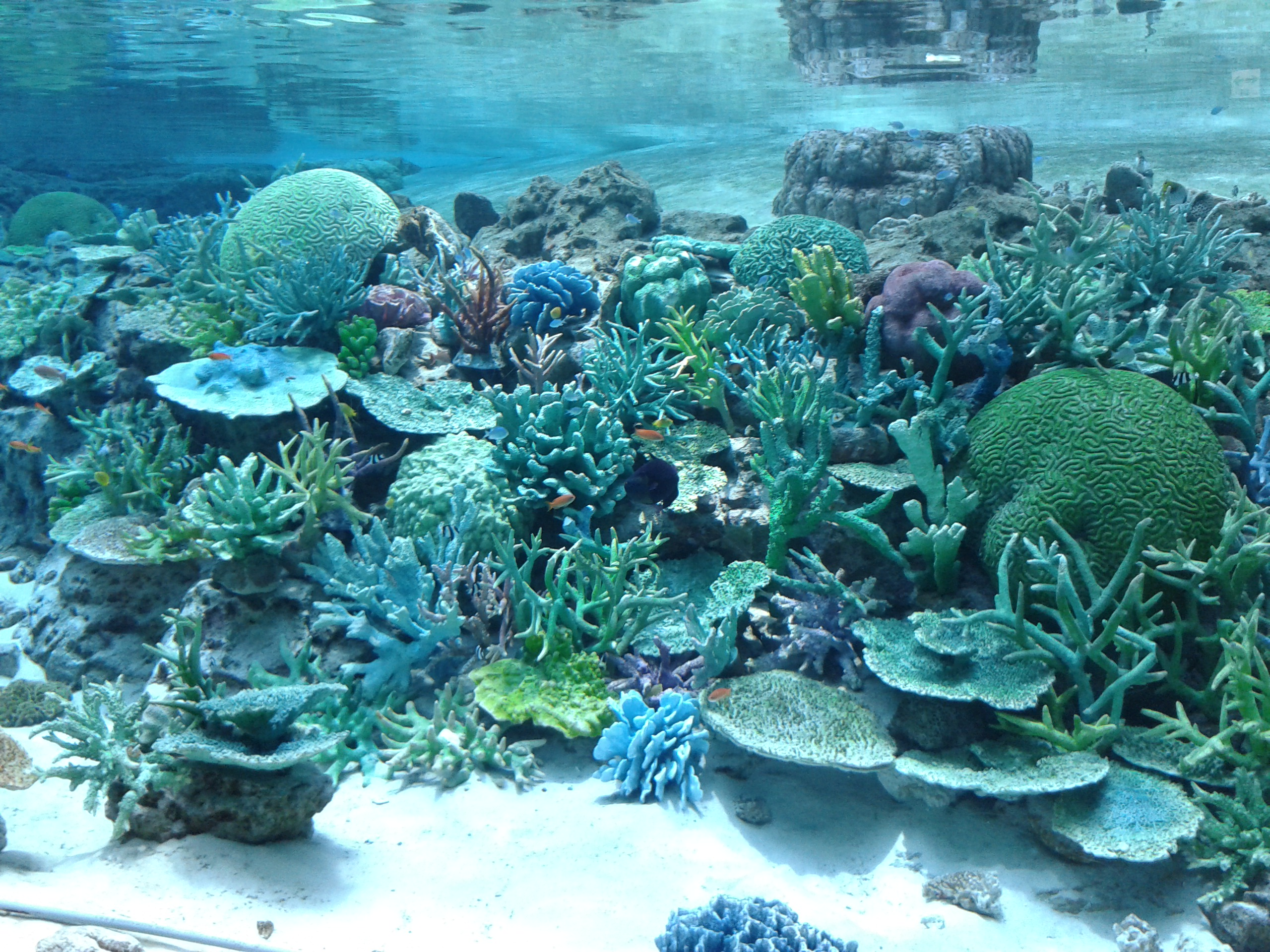

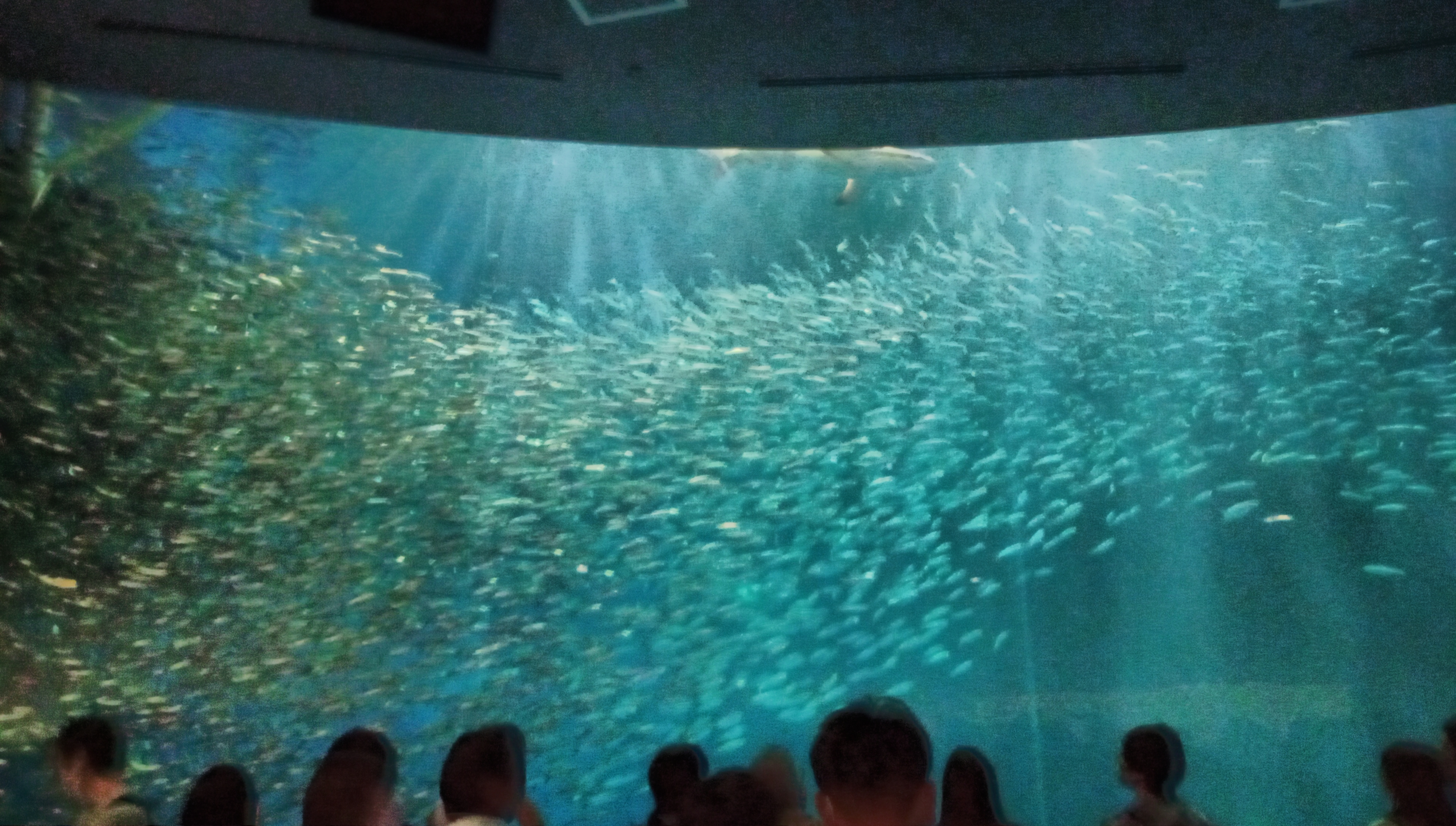

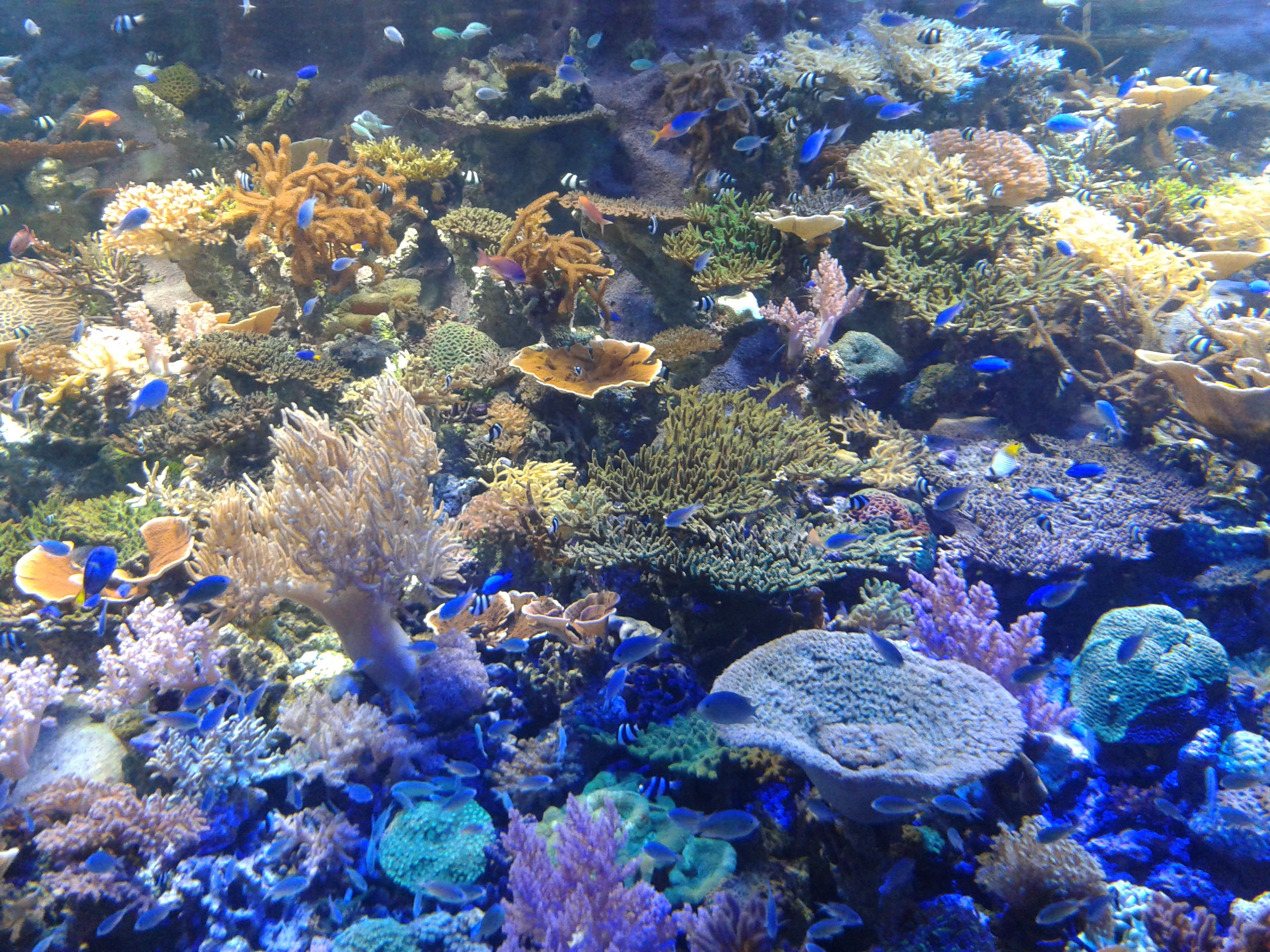

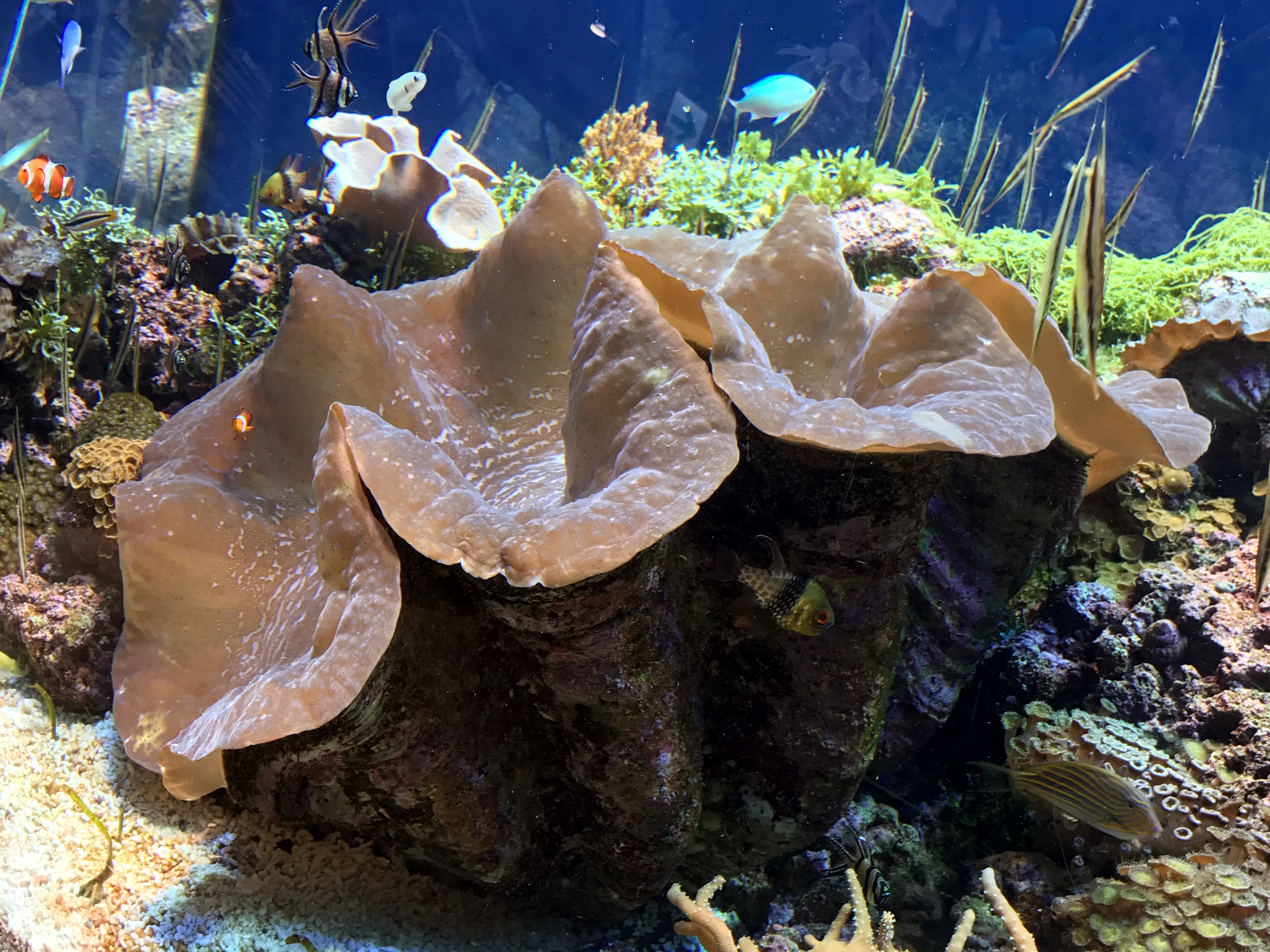

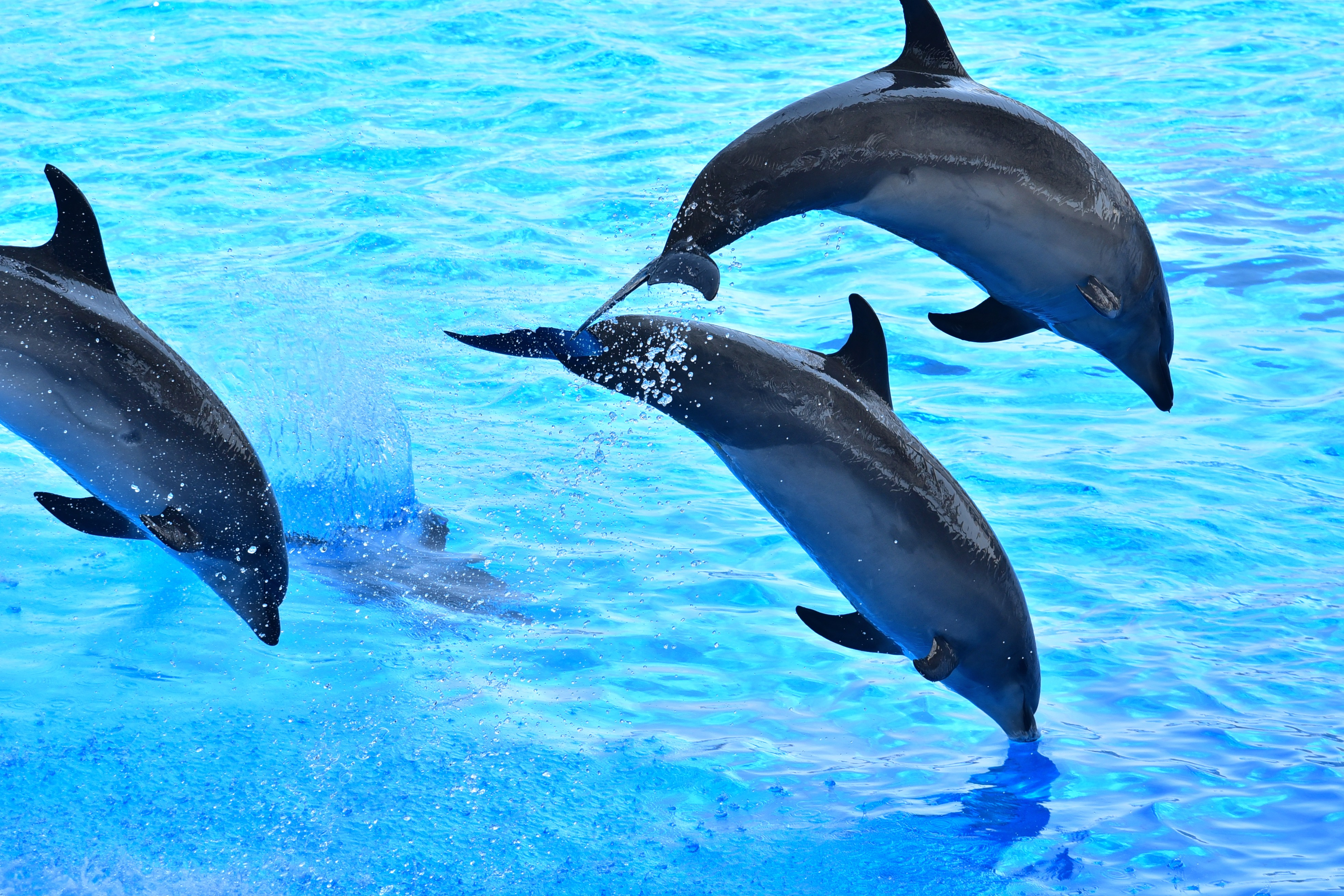

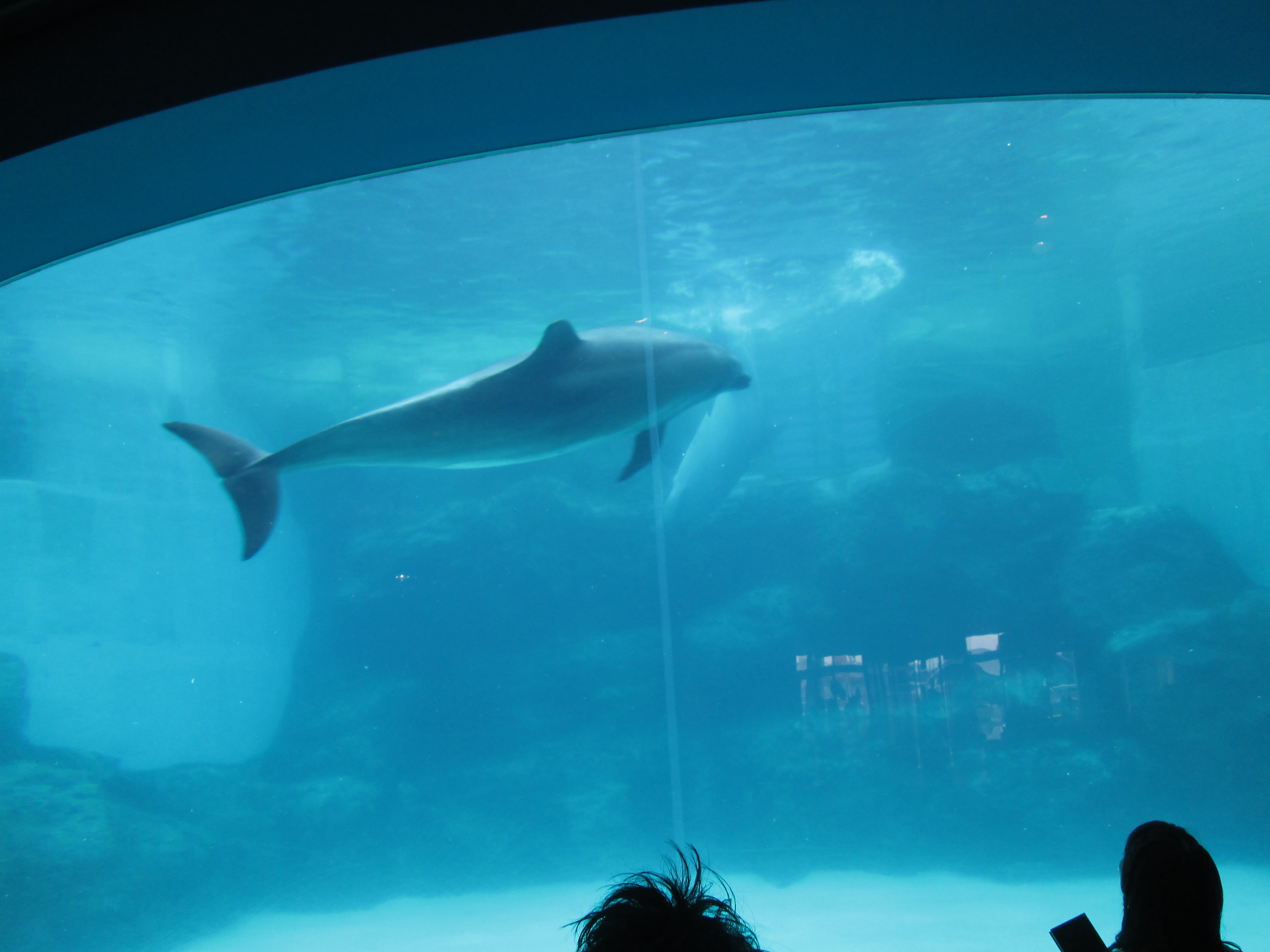

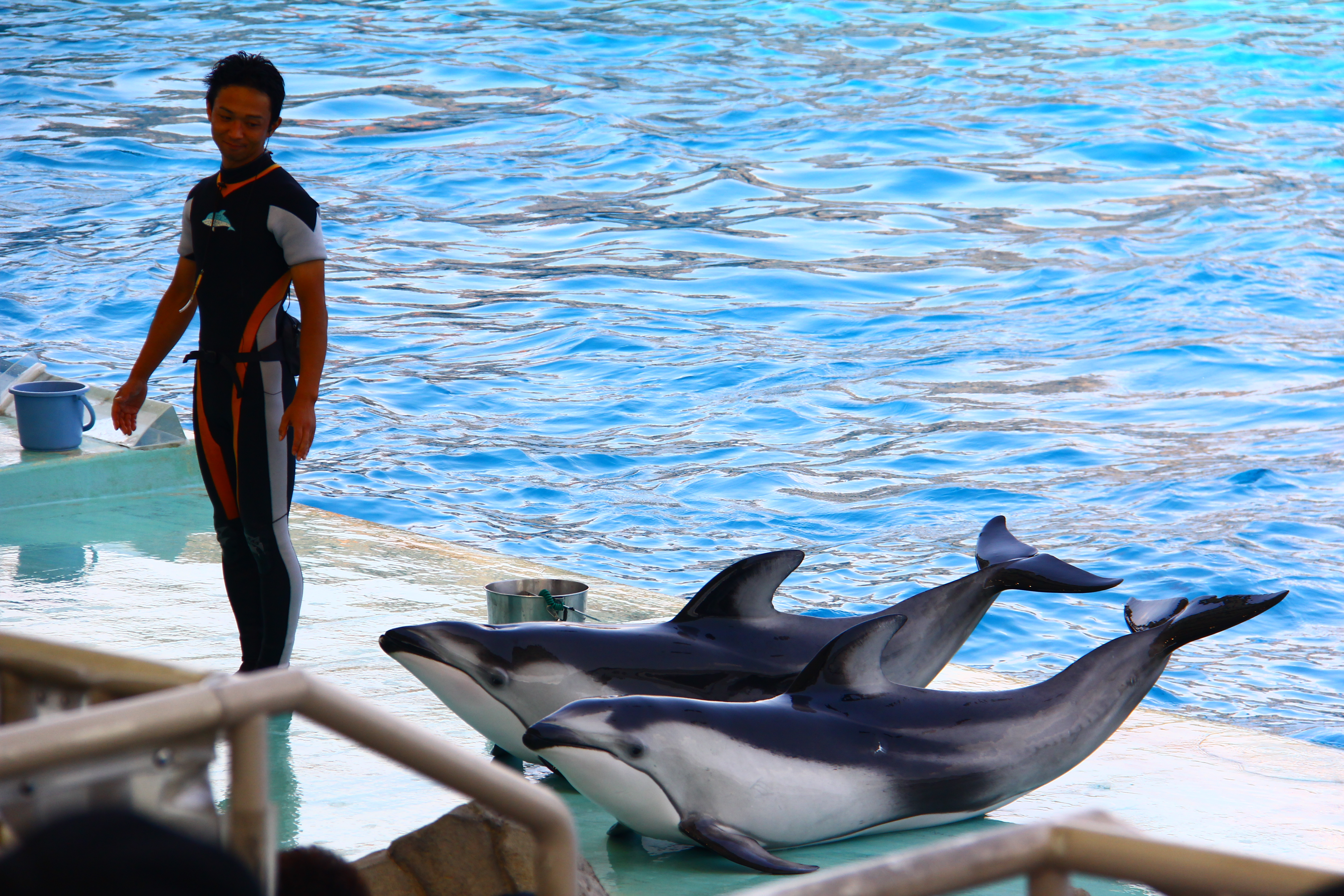

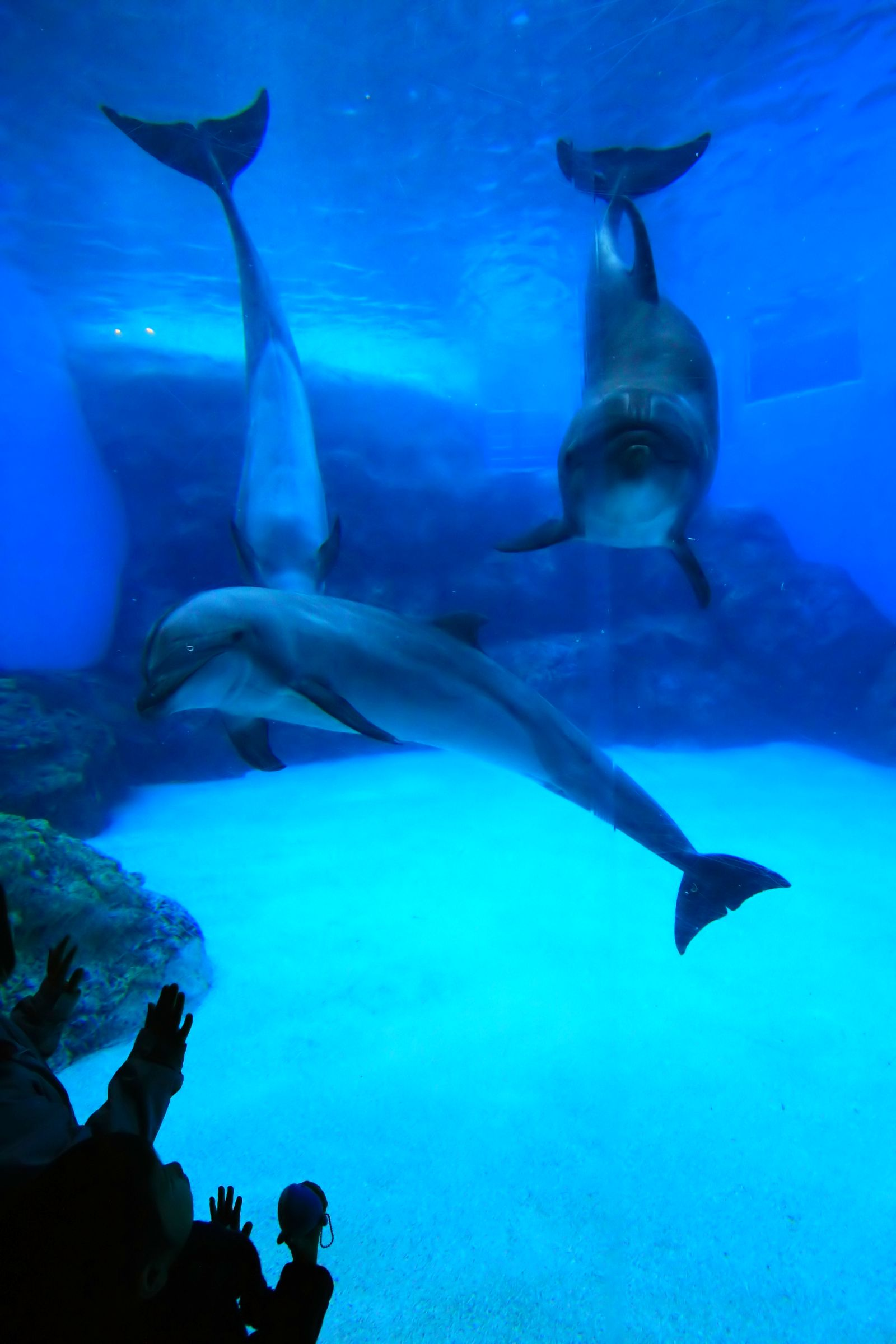

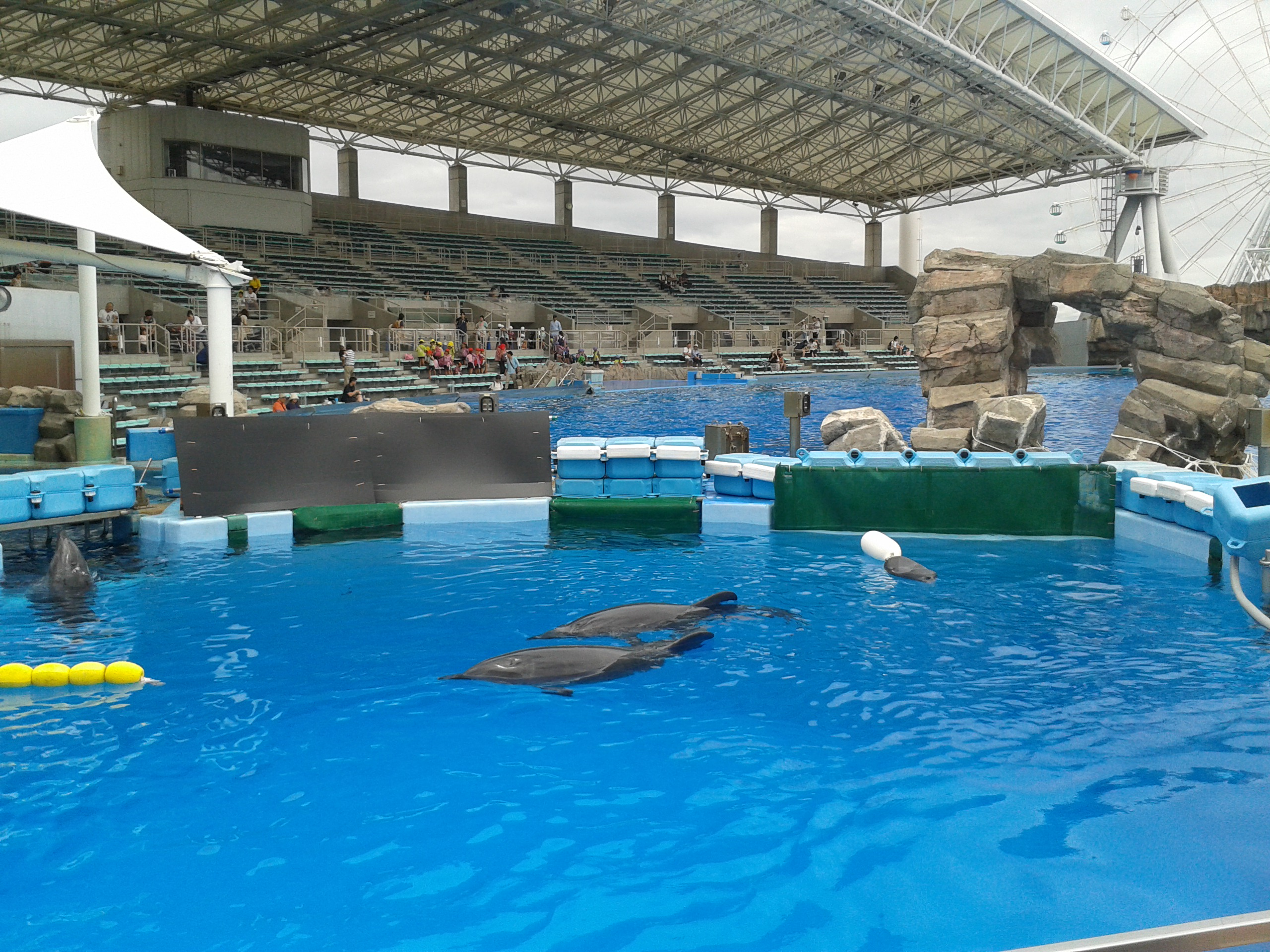

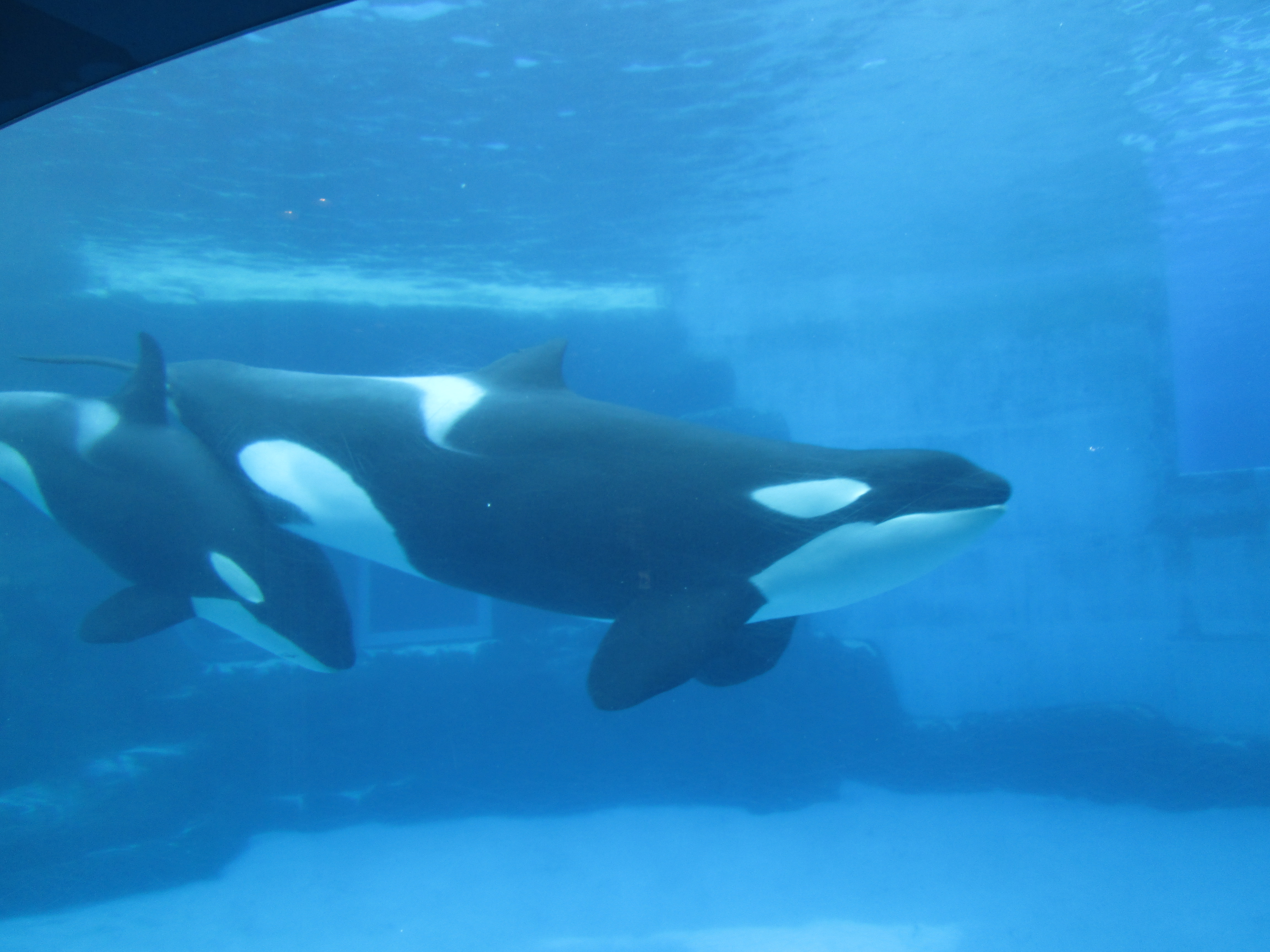

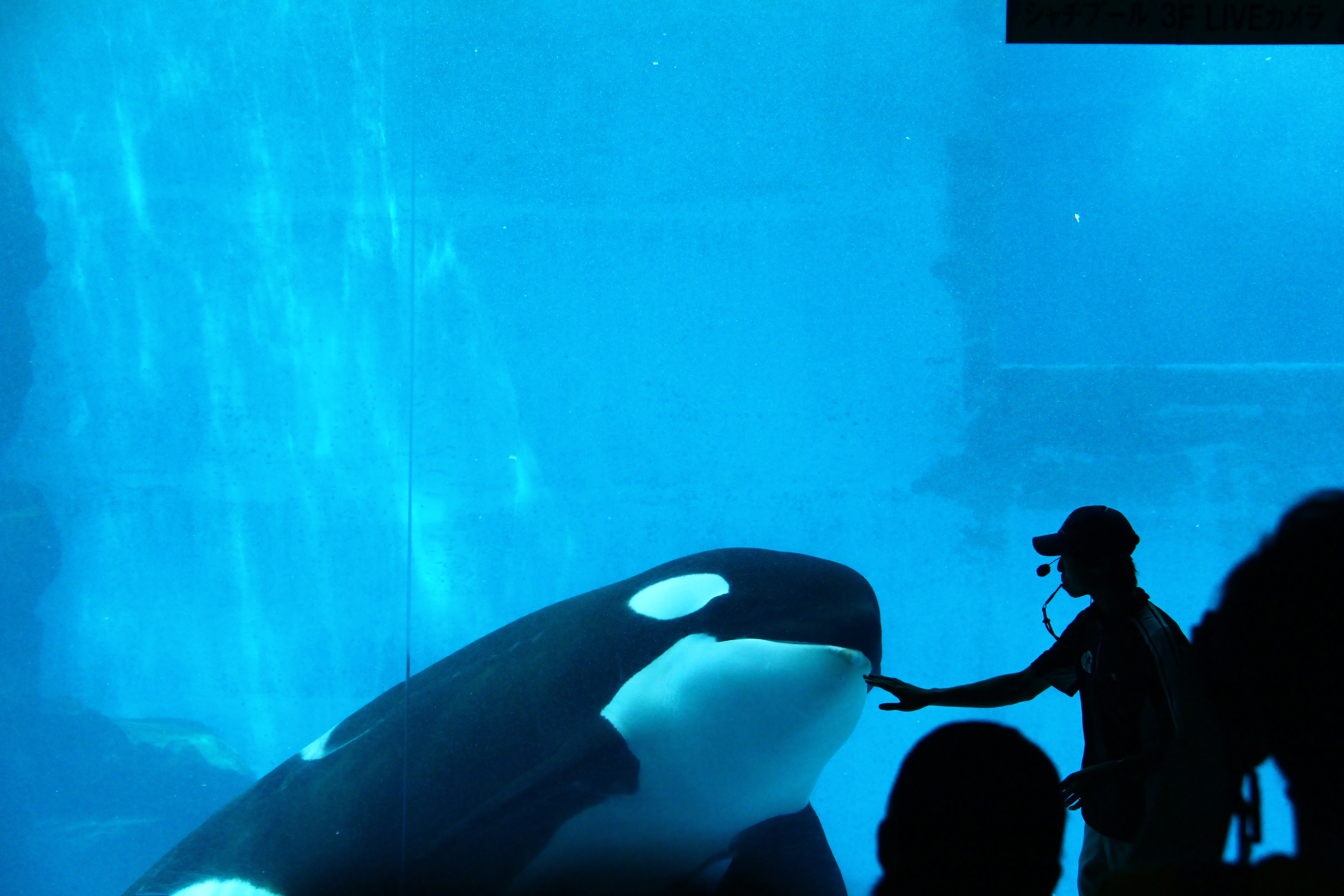

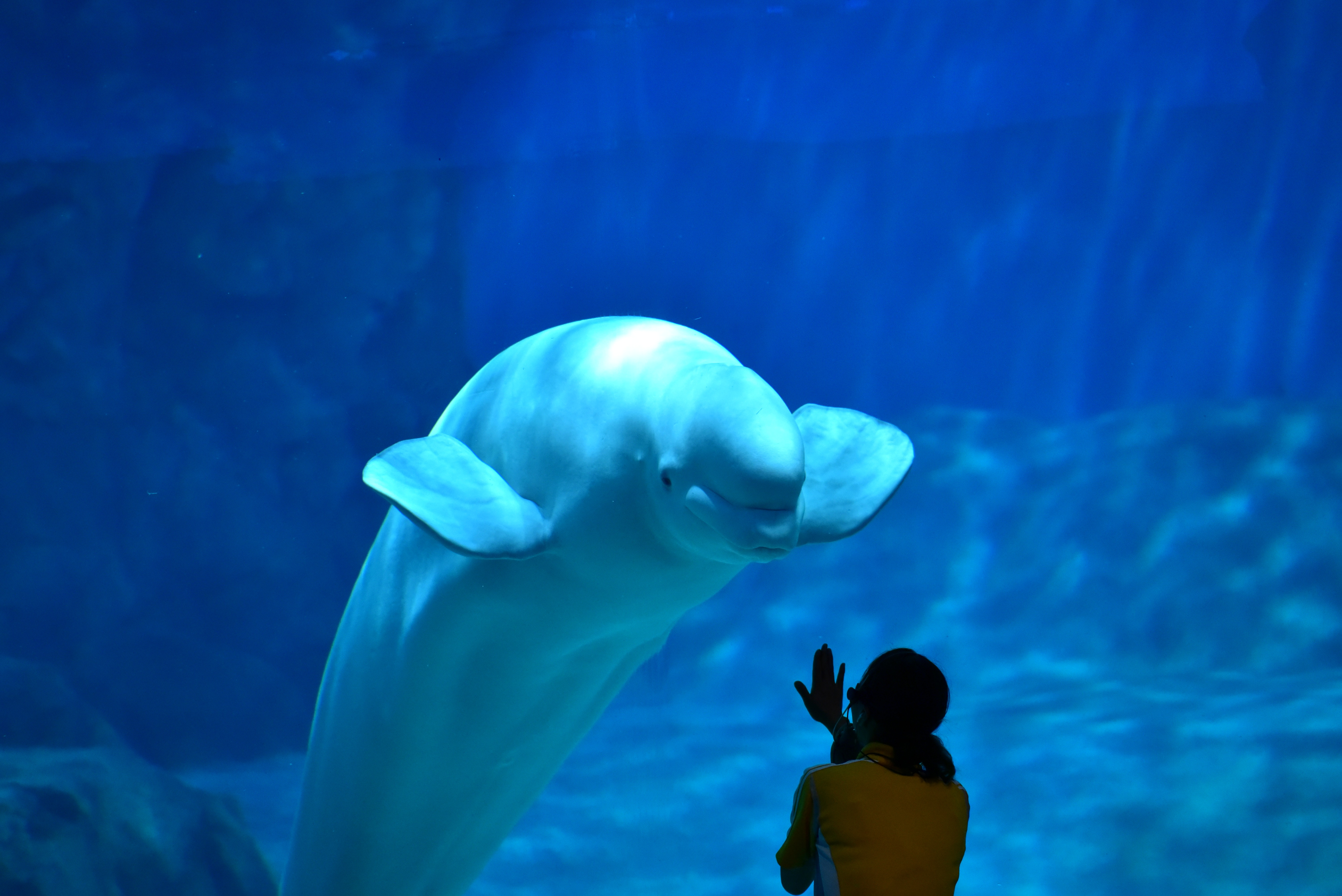

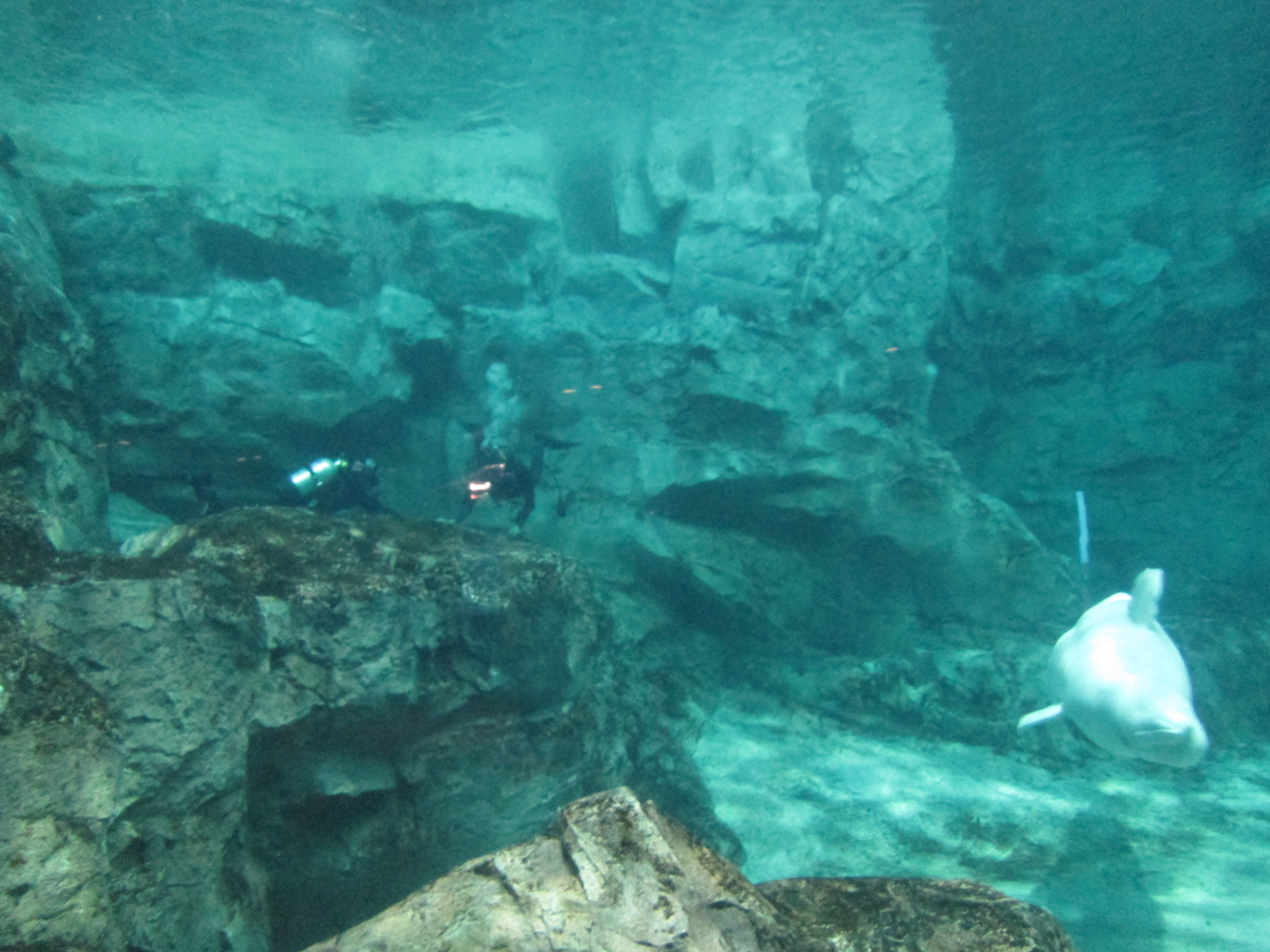

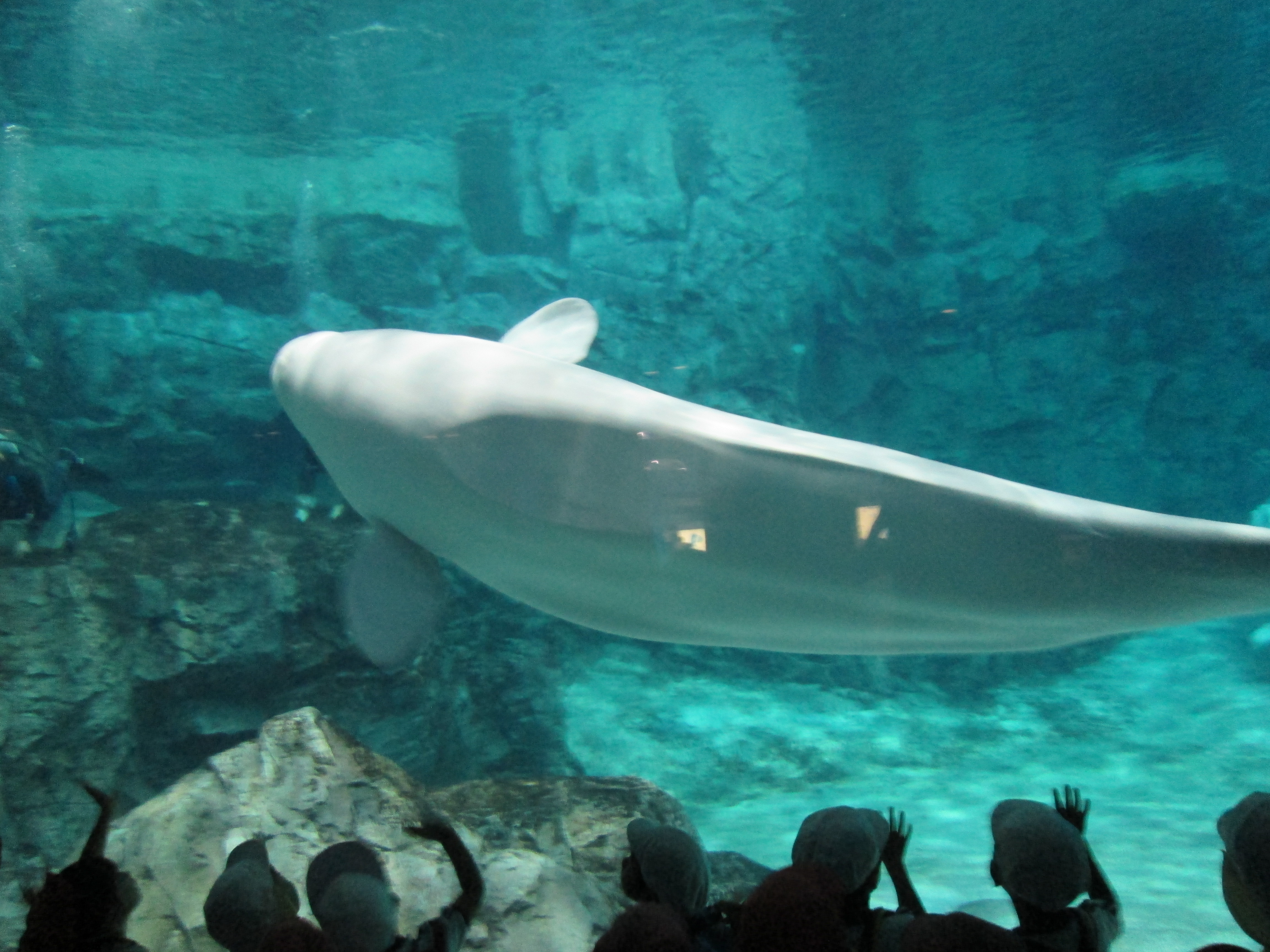

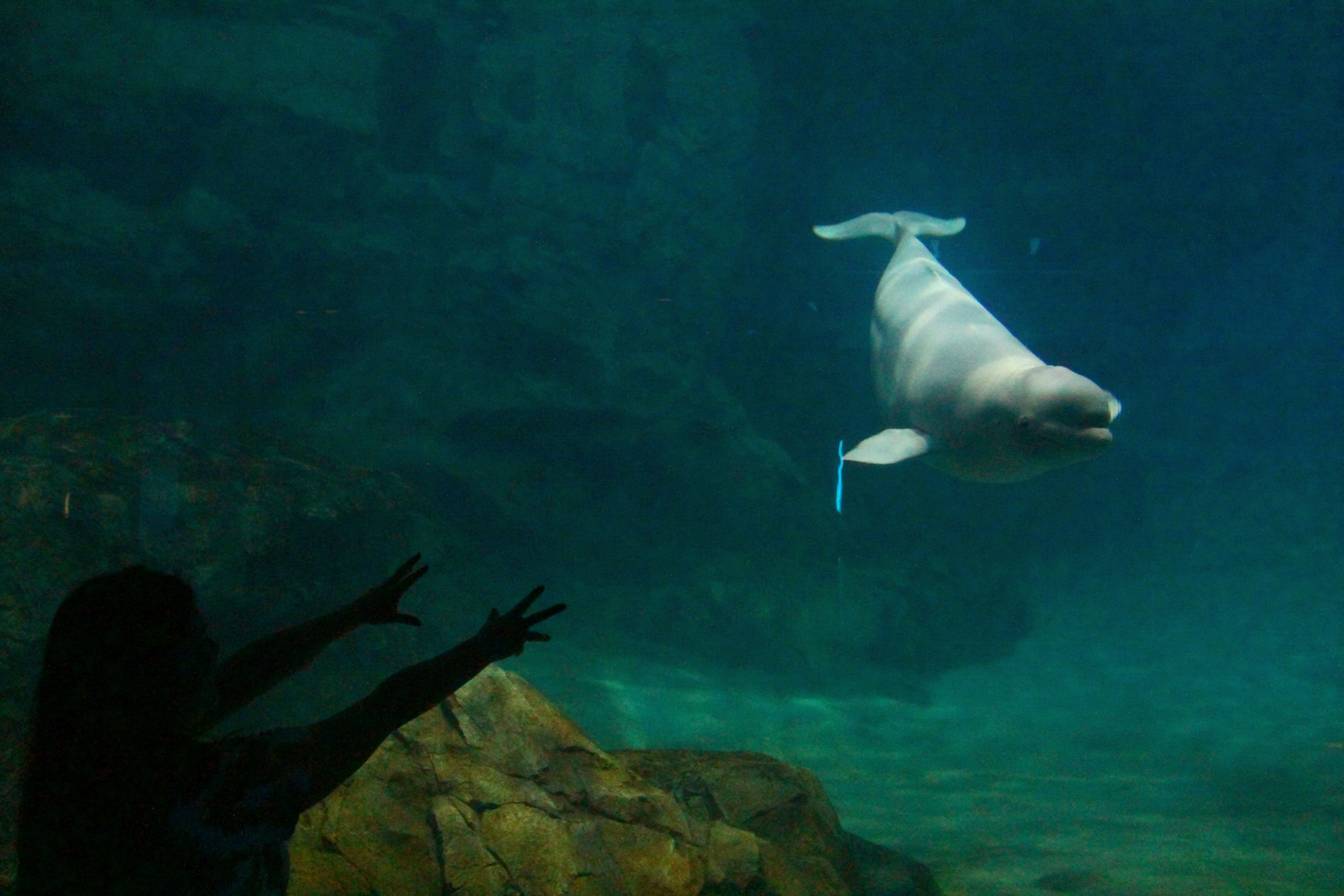

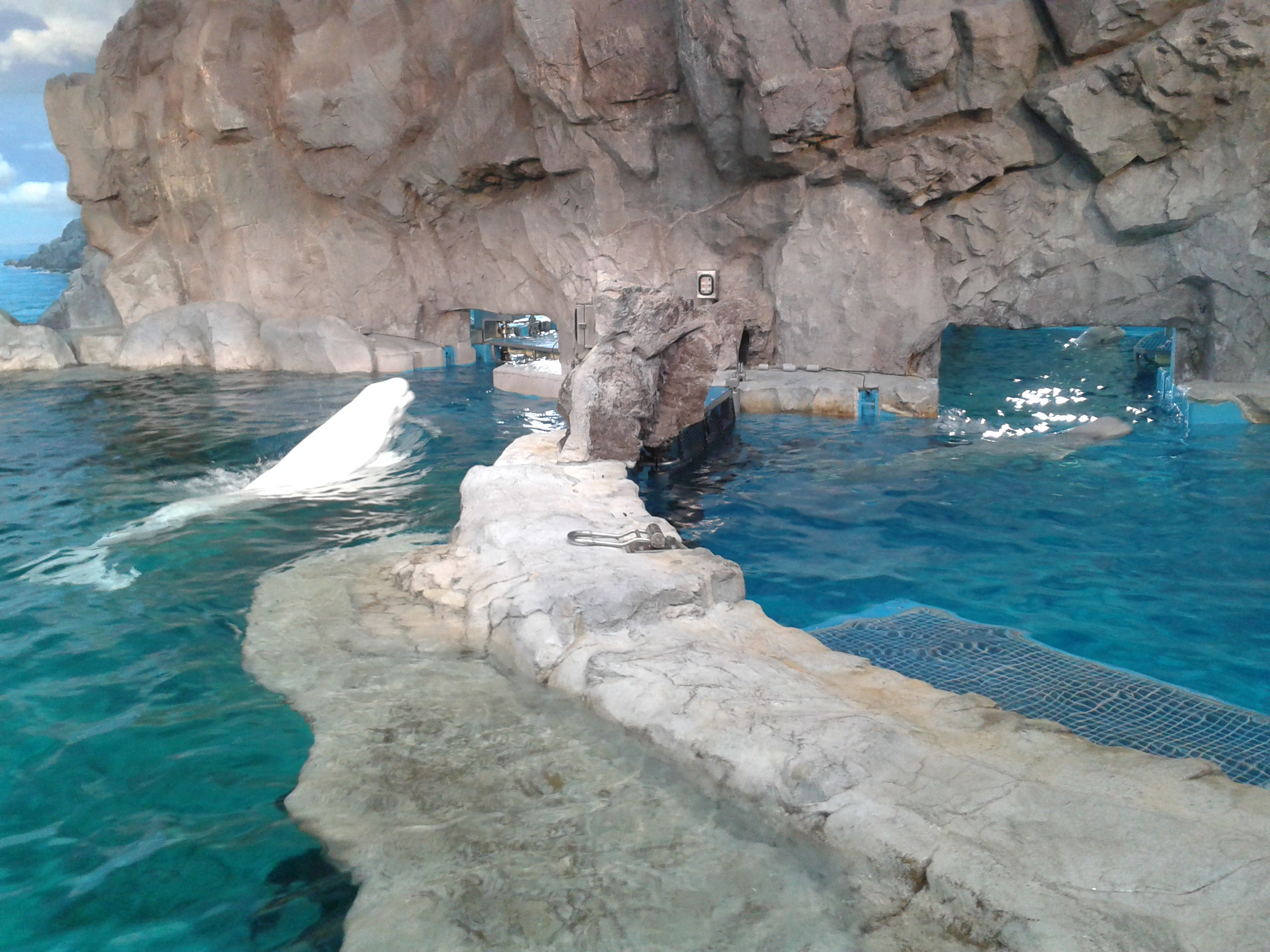

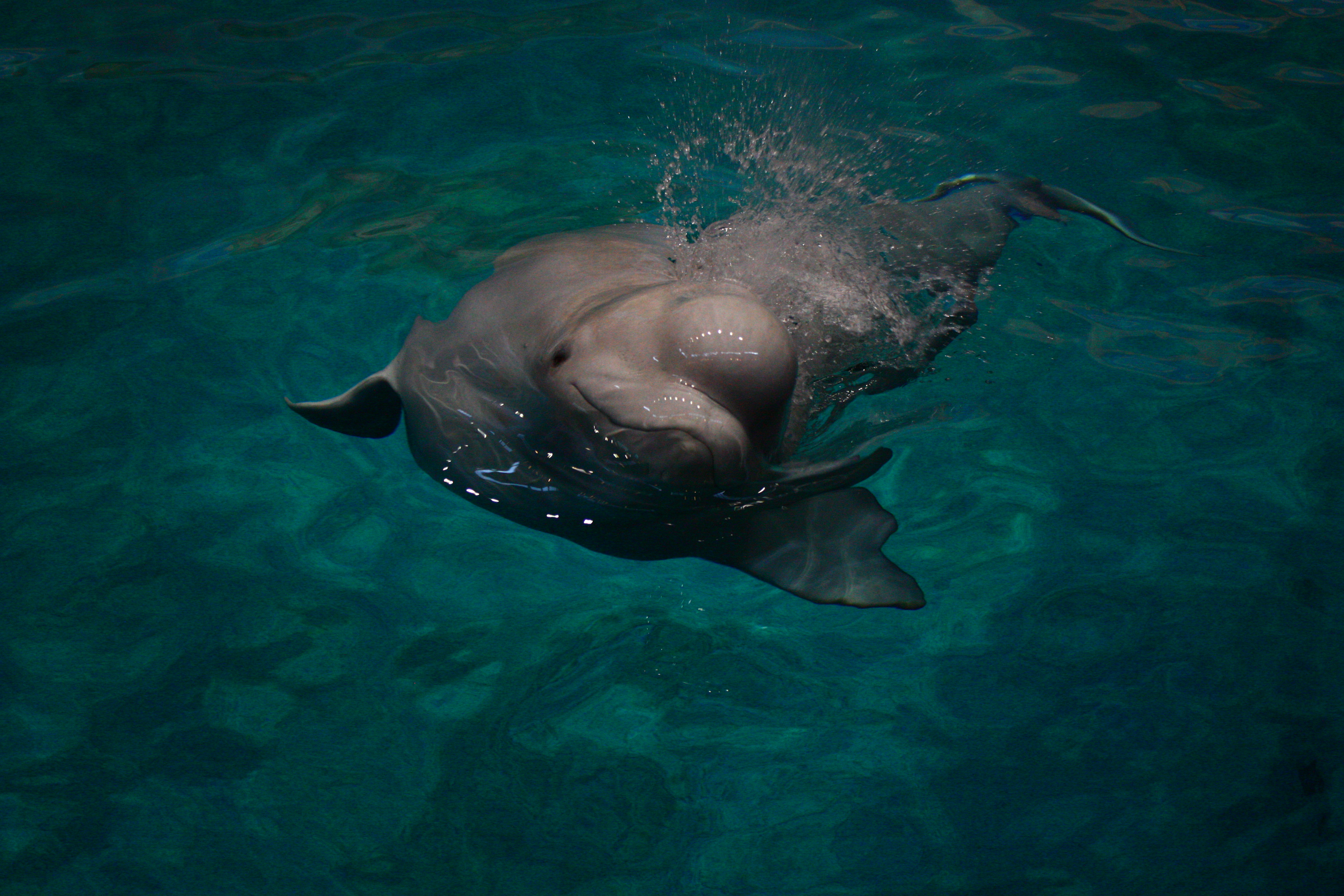

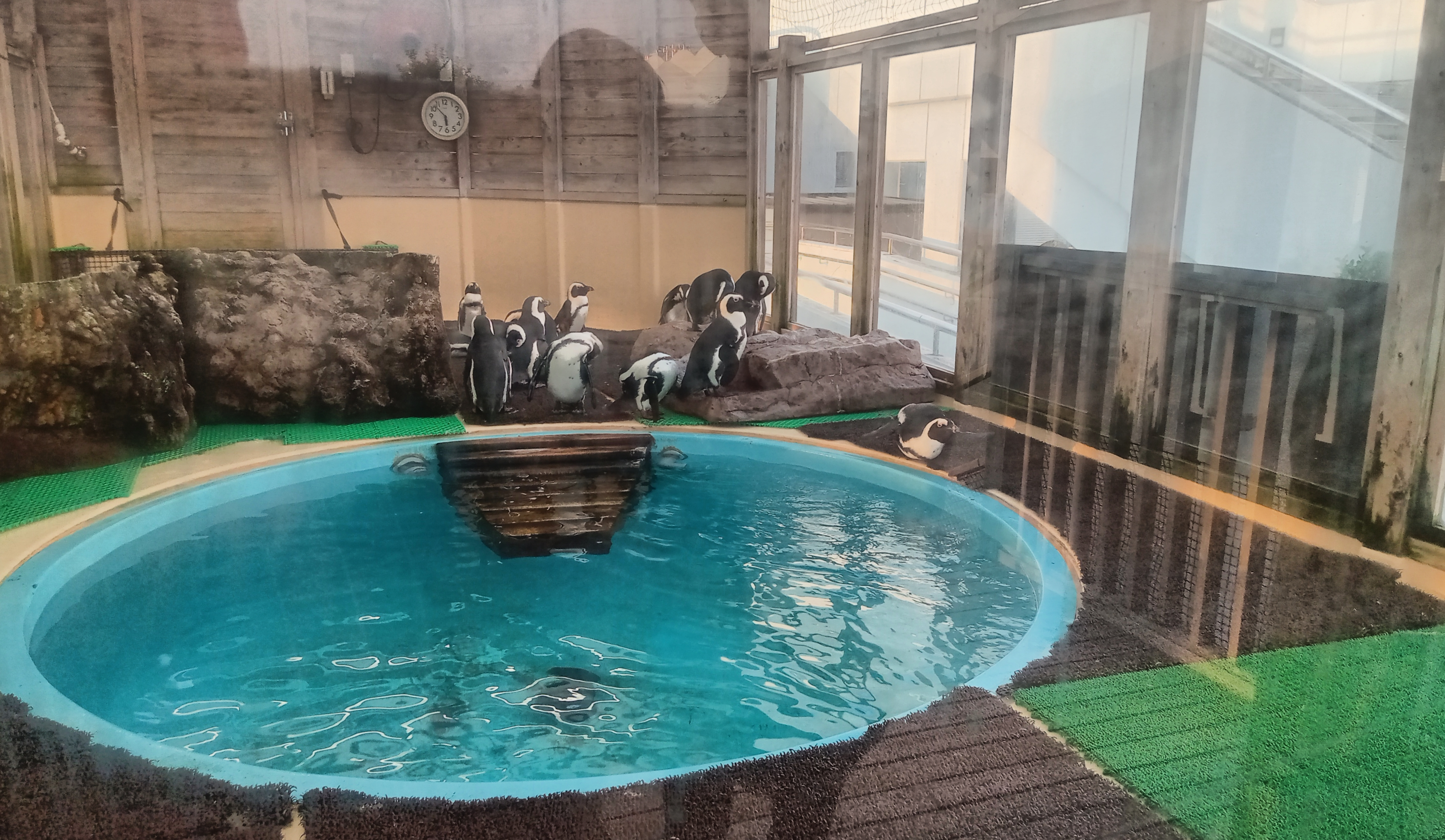

== Access ==
The aquarium is close to Nagoyakō Station on the subway's Meikō Line.

== See also ==
- Nagoya Port
- List of captive orcas
- Captive killer whales
- Italia Mura
- Japanese icebreaker Fuji (AGB-5001)
