= Tsukiji Shrine =

Shinto shrine in Aichi Prefecture, Japan

- 築地神社
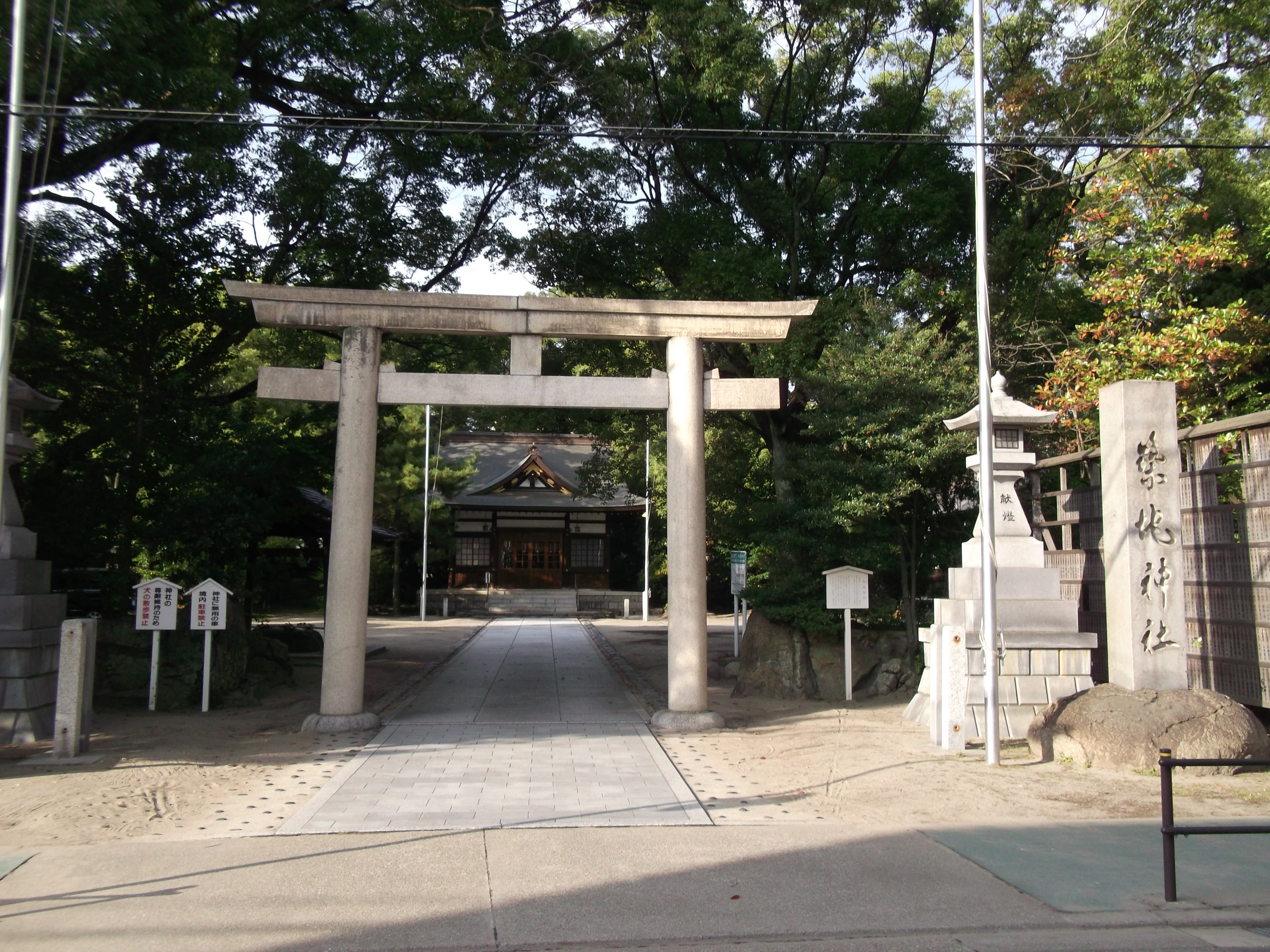

- Location within Japan

Religion
- Affiliation: Shinto
- Deity: Susanō

Location
- Location: 1-9-14 Chidori, Minato-ku, Nagoya, Aichi Prefecture
- Interactive map of Tsukiji Shrine
- Coordinates: 35°5′49″N 136°53′11″E

Architecture
- Established: 23 January 1938

Tsukiji Shrine (築地神社, Tsukiji-jinja) is a Shinto shrine in Minato-ku, Nagoya, Aichi Prefecture, Japan.

== Services ==
=== Annual Services ===
- January 1: New Year's Celebration
- Setsubun (in February): Setsubun Festival
- Vernal equinox: Ceremony for the spirits of the deceased of Tsukiji
- Around the Vernal Equinox: Service to comfort the spirits of people who have died working at Nagoya Port
- July 18: Nagoya Port's Summer Festival
- July 30: Chi-no-wakaguri, a Shinto purification ritual involving walking through a large ring of rope
- October 10: Kotohira-gū Festival and Izumo-taisha Festival
- October 23: this shrine's annual festival
- November 23: ceremonial offering by the Emperor of newly harvested rice to the deities
- Akihasan Hongū Akiha Jinja Festival
- December 31: New Year's Eve Festival and Purification Ceremony

=== Monthly Services ===
- Every month on the 1st, 15th, and 23rd: a monthly festival
