= Minato-ku, Nagoya =

Minato 港区
- Ward
- Minato Ward
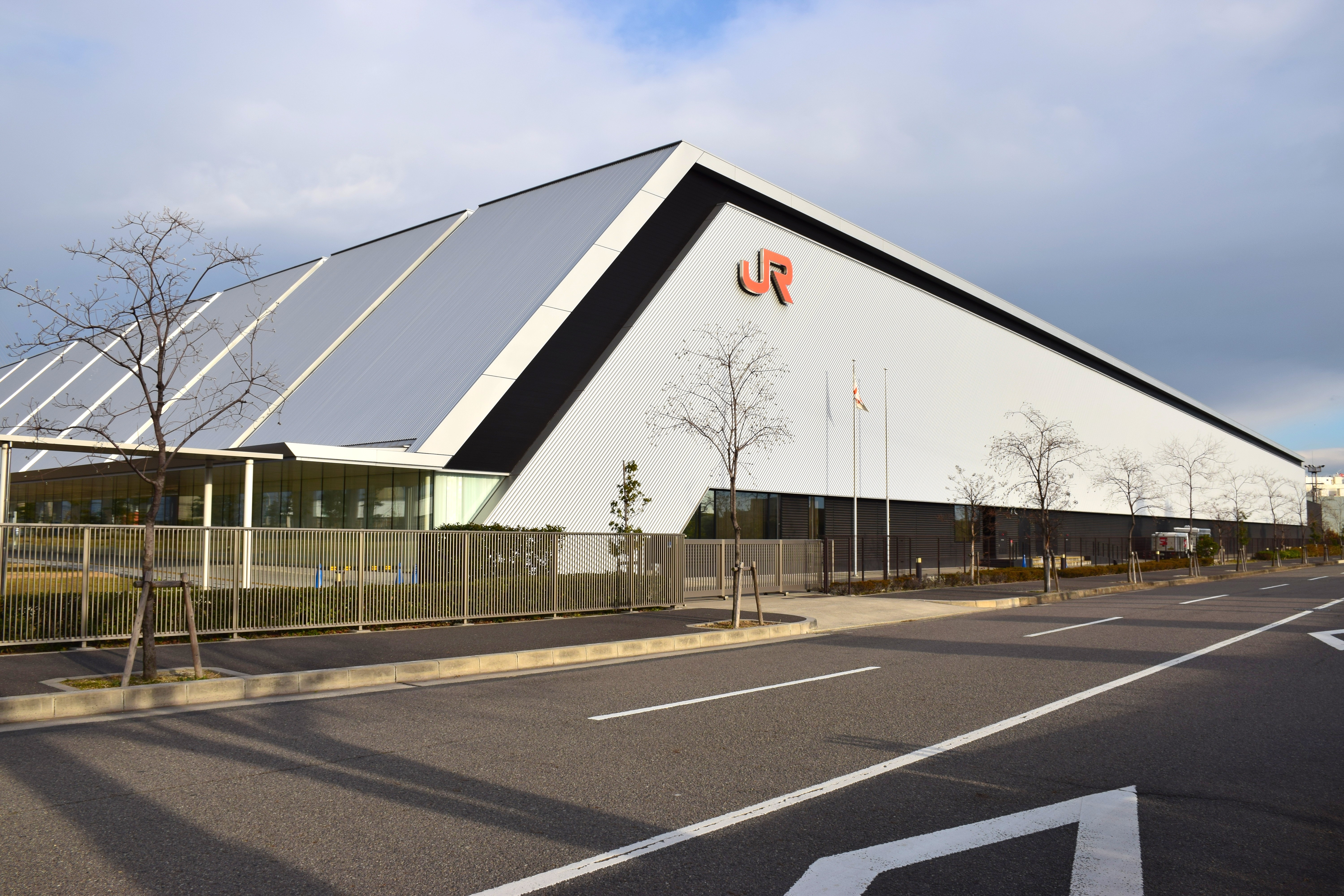
- SCMaglev and Railway Park

- Flag Seal

- Location of Minato-ku in Nagoya

- Coordinates: 35°06′28″N 136°53′08″E
- Country: Japan
- Region: Tōkai region Chūbu region
- Prefecture: Aichi

Area
  - Total: 45.64 km^{2} (17.62 sq mi)

Population (October 1, 2019)
  - Total: 143,913
  - Density: 3,153/km^{2} (8,167/sq mi)
- Time zone: UTC+9 (Japan Standard Time)
- Tree: Cinnamomum camphora; Camellia sasanqua
- Flower: Hibiscus
- Phone number: 052-651-3251
- Address: 1-12-20, Komei, Minato-ku, Nagoya-shi, Aichi-ken 455-8520
- Website: www.city.nagoya.jp/minato/ (in Japanese)

Minato-ku (港区, Minato-ku) is one of the 16 wards of the city of Nagoya in Aichi Prefecture, Japan. As of 1 October 2019, the ward had an estimated population of 143,913 and a population density of 3,153 persons per km^{2}. The total area was 45.64 km^{2}. It is geographically the largest of the wards of Nagoya in terms of land area.

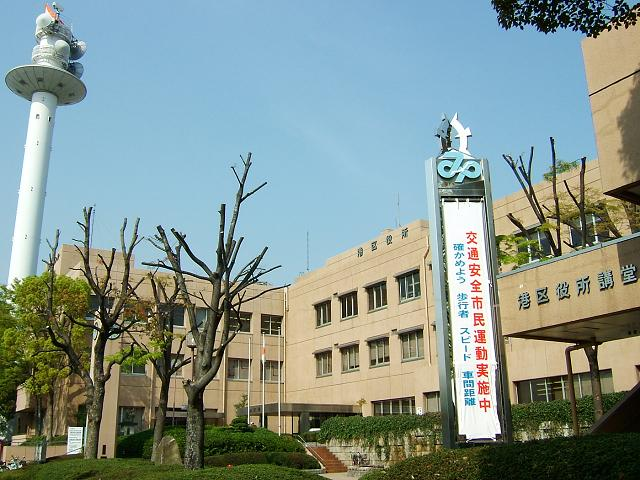
Minato-ku Ward Office

== Geography ==
Minato Ward is the southern portion of the city of Nagoya, in the coastal flatlands and river estuaries along the shore of Ise Bay. Due to land reclamation much of the coastline is no longer natural.

=== Surrounding municipalities ===
- Atsuta Ward
- Nakagawa Ward
- Minami Ward
- Tōkai
- Kanie
- Tobishima

== History ==
All of what is now Minato Ward was part of the holdings of Owari Domain during the Edo period. After the Meiji Restoration, the area was transferred to the new Nagoya Prefecture, which later became part of Aichi Prefecture. Nagoya was divided into wards on April 1, 1908. In 1922, Ousu village in Aichi District was annexed by the city of Nagoya becoming part of Minami Ward. The Nagoya Port Drawbridge was completed in 1926. On October 1, 1937, the city of Nagoya was re-divided into ten wards, with the original Minami Ward divided into the new Minami Ward, plus Atsuta Ward, Nakagawa Ward, Minato Ward, and part of Showa Ward. In 1955, the town of Nanyo from Ama District was annexed by Minato Ward. In 1959, the Isewan Typhoon caused severe damage to the area.

== Economy ==
The economy of Minato Ward is dominated by Nagoya Port, one of the busiest in Japan.

== Education ==
International schools:

- Colégio Brasil Japão Prof. Shinoda - Brazilian school

The ward previously hosted Colégio Áureo, another Brazilian school.

== Transportation ==
=== Ports ===
- Nagoya Port

=== Railroads ===
- Nagoya Seaside Rapid Railway - Aonami Line
  - Nagoya Keibajō-mae • Arakogawakōen • Inaei •

Noseki • Kinjō-Futō

- Meitetsu - Chikkō Line
  - Ōe - Higashi-Nagoyakō
- Nagoya Municipal Subway – Meikō Line
  - Tōkai-dōri • Minato Kuyakusho • Tsukiji-guchi • Nagoyakō

=== Highways ===
- Isewangan Expressway
- Japan National Route 23
- Japan National Route 154
- Japan National Route 302

== Local attractions ==
- Port of Nagoya Public Aquarium
- SCMaglev and Railway Park
- Legoland Japan
- Nagoya Port Building
- Nagoya Port Sea Train Land
- Nagoya Racecourse (Relocated to Yatomi in 2022)
- Nagoya City Wilde Bird Observation Center

== Local events ==
- Marine Day Nagoya Port Festival, held annually at Nagoya Port from 1946, as part of the postwar development plan. The festival is held on Marine Day.
