= Kuwayama =

Kuwayama may refer to:

== People with the surname ==
- George Kuwayama (1925–2022), American museum curator
- Hirokatsu Kuwayama (born 1942), Japanese water polo player
- Shinji Kuwayama, Japanese ichthyologist

== Other uses ==
- Kuwayama (insect), a bug genus in the family Triozidae
- Kuwayama Art Museum, an art museum in Nagoya, Aichi Prefecture, Japan
