= List of Nagoya Municipal Subway stations =

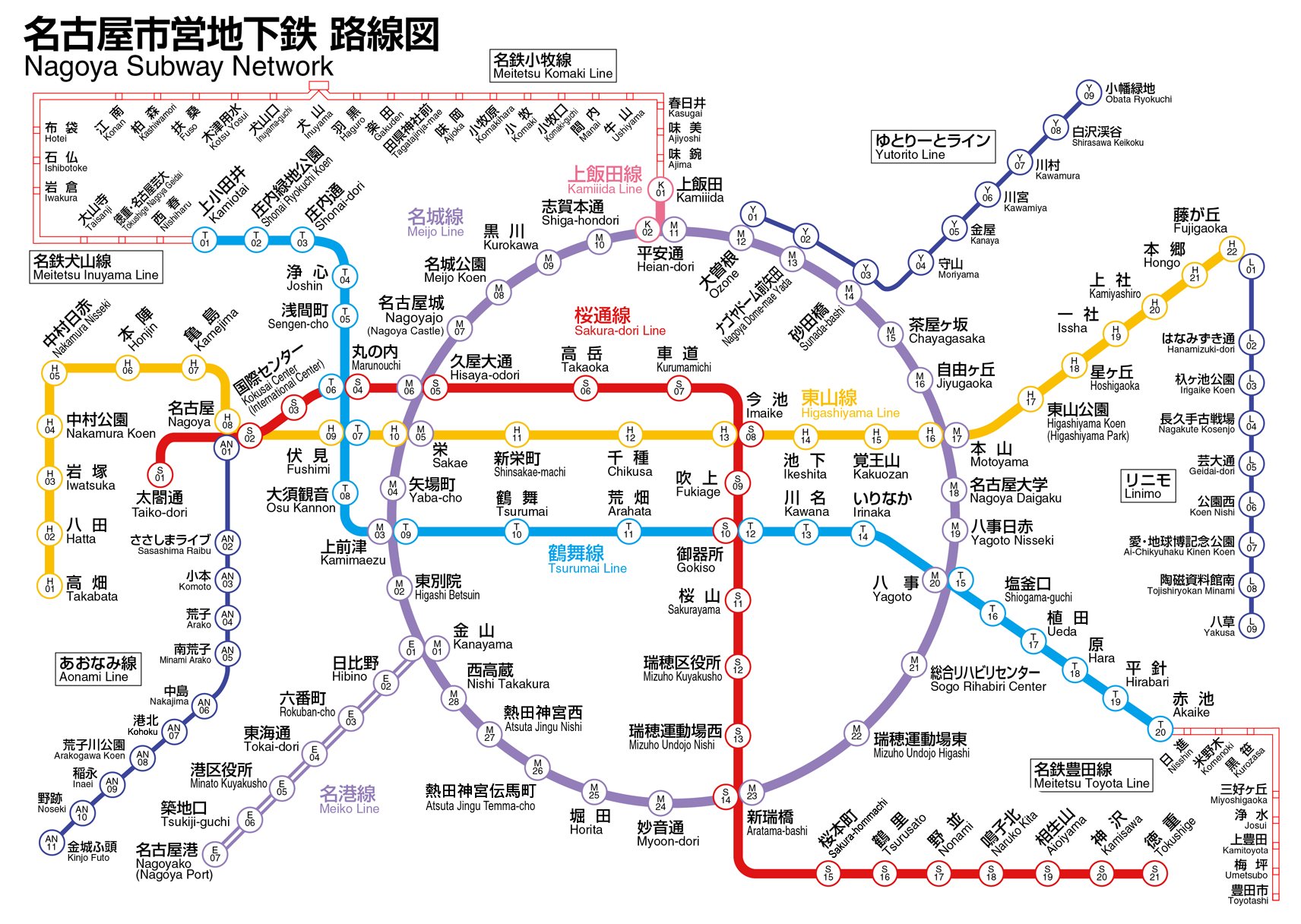
Nagoya Municipal Subway network map

There are currently 87 stations on the Nagoya Municipal Subway network with the first station being Sakae Station and Fushimi Station on the section on the Higashiyama Line, opened on November 15, 1957.

As of 2022, the subway network is currently at the length of 93.3 km (58.0 mi), and was used approximately 418,995,000 times. The network serves all 16 wards in the city of Nagoya with an exception of Moriyama-ku. The Akaike Station, located in Nisshin is the only station belonging in the network outside of Nagoya.

== Stations ==
=== Higashiyama Line ===
No.	Station name		Photo	Transfers	Opened	Notes	Ward or City
No.	English	Japanese	Photo	Transfers	Opened	Notes	Ward or City
H01	Takabata	高畑			September 21, 1982		Nakagawa-ku
H02	Hatta	八田		Kansai Main Line; Kintetsu Nagoya Line (Kintetsu Hatta)	September 21, 1982		Nakagawa-ku
H03	Iwatsuka	岩塚			September 21, 1982		Nakamura-ku
H04	Nakamura Kōen	中村公園			April 1, 1969		Nakamura-ku
H05	Nakamura Nisseki	中村日赤			April 1, 1969		Nakamura-ku
H06	Honjin	本陣			April 1, 1969		Nakamura-ku
H07	Kamejima	亀島			April 1, 1969		Nakamura-ku
H08	Nagoya	名古屋		Sakura-dōri Line; Tōkaidō Main Line; Chūō Main Line; Kansai Main Line; Tokaido Shinkansen; Aonami Line; Meitetsu Nagoya Main Line (Meitetsu Nagoya Station); Kintetsu Nagoya Line (Kintetsu Nagoya Station)	November 15, 1957		Nakamura-ku
H09	Fushimi	伏見		Tsurumai Line	November 15, 1957		Naka-ku
H10	Sakae	栄		Meijō Line; Meitetsu Seto Line (Sakaemachi Station)	November 15, 1957		Naka-ku
H11	Shinsakae-machi	新栄町			June 15, 1960		Higashi-ku
H12	Chikusa	千種		Chūō Main Line	June 15, 1960	Unlike the station on the Chuo Main Line, the station is not located in Chikusa-ku.	Higashi-ku
H13	Imaike	今池		Sakura-dōri Line	June 15, 1960		Chikusa-ku
H14	Ikeshita	池下			June 15, 1960		Chikusa-ku
H15	Kakuozan	覚王山			April 1, 1963		Chikusa-ku
H16	Motoyama	本山		Meijō Line	April 1, 1963		Chikusa-ku
H17	Higashiyama Kōen	東山公園			April 1, 1963		Chikusa-ku
H18	Hoshigaoka	星ヶ丘			March 30, 1967		Chikusa-ku
H19	Issha	一社			April 1, 1969		Meitō-ku
H20	Kamiyashiro	上社			December 10, 1970		Meitō-ku
H21	Hongō	本郷			April 1, 1969		Meitō-ku
H22	Fujigaoka	藤が丘		Linimo	April 1, 1969	Formerly named "Fujigaoka (藤ヶ丘)".	Meitō-ku

=== Meikō Line and Meijō Line ===
No.	Station name		Photo	Transfers	Opened	Notes	Ward or City
No.	English	Japanese	Photo	Transfers	Opened	Notes	Ward or City
↑Through service to Meikō Line and loop line towards Nishi Takakura↑
M01	Kanayama	金山		Meikō Line; Tōkaidō Main Line; Chūō Main Line; Meitetsu Nagoya Main Line	March 30, 1967		Naka-ku
M02	Higashi Betsuin	東別院			March 30, 1967		Naka-ku
M03	Kamimaezu	上前津		Tsurumai Line	March 30, 1967		Naka-ku
M04	Yabachō	矢場町			March 30, 1967		Naka-ku
M05	Sakae	栄		Higashiyama Line; Meitetsu Seto Line (Sakaemachi Station)	October 15, 1965		Naka-ku
M06	Hisaya-ōdōri	久屋大通		Sakura-dōri Line	September 10, 1989		Naka-ku
M07	Nagoyajo (Nagoya Castle)	名古屋城			October 15, 1965	Formerly named Shiyakusho (市役所; "City Hall") until January 4, 2023.	Naka-ku
M08	Meijo Koen	名城公園			December 20, 1971		Kita-ku
M09	Kurokawa	黒川			December 20, 1971		Kita-ku
M10	Shiga-hondōri	志賀本通			December 20, 1971		Kita-ku
M11	Heian-dori	平安通		Kamiiida Line	December 20, 1971		Kita-ku
M12	Ōzone	大曽根		Chūō Main Line; Meitetsu Seto Line; Yutorito Line	December 20, 1971		Kita-ku
M13	Nagoya Dome-mae Yada	ナゴヤドーム前矢田		Yutorito Line	January 19, 2000	Planned as Yada (矢田). Changed to include Nagoya Dome in its name.	Higashi-ku
M14	Sunadabashi	砂田橋		Yutorito Line	January 19, 2000		Higashi-ku
M15	Chayagasaka	茶屋ヶ坂			December 13, 2003		Chikusa-ku
M16	Jiyugaoka	自由ヶ丘			December 13, 2003		Chikusa-ku
M17	Motoyama	本山		Higashiyama Line	December 13, 2003		Chikusa-ku
M18	Nagoya Daigaku	名古屋大学			December 13, 2003		Chikusa-ku
M19	Yagoto Nisseki	八事日赤			October 6, 2004		Shōwa-ku
M20	Yagoto	八事		Tsurumai Line	October 6, 2004		Shōwa-ku
M21	Sogo Rihabiri Center	総合リハビリセンター			October 6, 2004	Planned as Shimizugaoka (清水ヶ岡).	Mizuho-ku
M22	Mizuho Undojo Higashi	瑞穂運動場東			October 6, 2004	Planned as Yamashita-dori (山下通).	Mizuho-ku
M23	Aratama-bashi	新瑞橋		Sakura-dōri Line	March 30, 1974		Mizuho-ku
M24	Myoon-dori	妙音通			March 30, 1974		Mizuho-ku
M25	Horita	堀田			March 30, 1974		Mizuho-ku
M26	Atsuta Jingu Tenma-cho	熱田神宮伝馬町			March 30, 1974	Formerly named Tenma-cho (伝馬町) until January 4, 2023.	Atsuta-ku
M27	Atsuta Jingu Nishi	熱田神宮西			March 30, 1974	Formerly named Jingu Nishi (神宮西; "Shrine West") until January 4, 2023.	Atsuta-ku
M28	Nishi Takakura	西高蔵			March 30, 1974		Atsuta-ku
↓Loop line towards Kanayama↓

No.	Station name		Photo	Transfers	Opened	Notes	Ward or City
No.	English	Japanese	Photo	Transfers	Opened	Notes	Ward or City
↑Through service to Meijō Line (Ōzone)↑
E01	Kanayama	金山		Meijō Line; Tōkaidō Main Line; Chūō Main Line; Meitetsu Nagoya Main Line	March 29, 1971		Naka-ku
E02	Hibino	日比野			March 29, 1971		Atsuta-ku
E03	Rokuban-chō Station	六番町			March 29, 1971		Atsuta-ku
E04	Tōkai-dōri	東海通			March 29, 1971		Minato-ku
E05	Minato Kuyakusho	港区役所			March 29, 1971		Minato-ku
E06	Tsukijiguchi	築地口			March 29, 1971		Minato-ku
E07	Nagoyakō	名古屋港			March 29, 1971		Minato-ku

=== Tsurumai Line ===
No.	Station name		Photo	Transfers	Opened	Notes	Ward or City
No.	English	Japanese	Photo	Transfers	Opened	Notes	Ward or City
↑Through service to Meitetsu Inuyama Line (Inuyama)↑
T01	Kami Otai	上小田井		Meitetsu Inuyama Line	August 12, 1993		Nishi-ku
T02	Shonai Ryokuchi Koen	庄内緑地公園			September 6, 1984		Nishi-ku
T03	Shonai-dori	庄内通			September 6, 1984		Nishi-ku
T04	Joshin	浄心			November 27, 1981		Nishi-ku
T05	Sengen-cho	浅間町			November 27, 1981		Nishi-ku
T06	Marunouchi	丸の内		Sakura-dōri Line	November 27, 1981		Naka-ku
T07	Fushimi	伏見		Higashiyama Line	March 18, 1977		Naka-ku
T08	Osu Kannon	大須観音			March 18, 1977		Naka-ku
T09	Kamimaezu	上前津		Meijō Line	March 18, 1977		Naka-ku
T10	Tsurumai	鶴舞		Chūō Main Line	March 18, 1977		
T11	Arahata	荒畑			March 18, 1977		Shōwa-ku
T12	Gokiso	御器所		Sakura-dōri Line	March 18, 1977		Shōwa-ku
T13	Kawana	川名			March 18, 1977		Shōwa-ku
T14	Irinaka	いりなか			March 18, 1977		Shōwa-ku
T15	Yagoto	八事		Meijō Line	March 18, 1977		Shōwa-ku
T16	Shiogama-guchi	塩釜口			October 1, 1978		Tenpaku-ku
T17	Ueda	植田			October 1, 1978		Tenpaku-ku
T18	Hara	原			October 1, 1978		Tenpaku-ku
T19	Hirabari	平針			October 1, 1978		Tenpaku-ku
T20	Akaike	赤池		Meitetsu Toyota Line	October 1, 1978		Nisshin
↓Through service to Meitetsu Toyota Line (Toyotashi)↓

=== Sakura-dōri Line ===
No.	Station name		Photo	Transfers	Opened	Notes	Ward or City
No.	English	Japanese	Photo	Transfers	Opened	Notes	Ward or City
S01	Taiko-dori	太閤通			September 10, 1989	Formerly named Nakamura-Kuyakusho (中村区役所; "Nakamura Ward Office").	Nakamura-ku
S02	Nagoya	名古屋		Higashiyama Line; Tōkaidō Main Line; Chūō Main Line; Kansai Main Line; Tokaido Shinkansen; Aonami Line; Meitetsu Nagoya Main Line (Meitetsu Nagoya Station); Kintetsu Nagoya Line (Kintetsu Nagoya Station)	September 10, 1989		Nakamura-ku
S03	Kokusai Center	国際センター			September 10, 1989		Nakamura-ku
S04	Marunouchi	丸の内		Tsurumai Line	September 10, 1989		Naka-ku
S05	Hisaya-ōdōri	久屋大通		Meijō Line	September 10, 1989		Naka-ku
S06	Takaoka	高岳			September 10, 1989		Higashi-ku
S07	Kurumamichi	車道			September 10, 1989		Higashi-ku
S08	Imaike	今池		Higashiyama Line	September 10, 1989		Chikusa-ku
S09	Fukiage	吹上			March 30, 1994		Chikusa-ku
S10	Gokiso	御器所		Tsurumai Line	March 30, 1994		Showa-ku
S11	Sakurayama	桜山			March 30, 1994		Mizuho-ku
S12	Mizuho Kuyakusho	瑞穂区役所			March 30, 1994		Mizuho-ku
S13	Mizuho Undojo Nishi	瑞穂運動所西			March 30, 1994		Mizuho-ku
S14	Aratamabashi	新瑞橋		Meijō Line	March 30, 1994		Mizuho-ku
S15	Sakura-hommachi	桜本町			March 30, 1994		Minami-ku
S16	Tsurusato	鶴里			March 30, 1994		Minami-ku
S17	Nonami	野並			March 30, 1994		Tenpaku-ku

=== Kamiiida Line ===
No.	Station name		Photo	Transfers	Opened	Notes	Ward or City
No.	English	Japanese	Photo	Transfers	Opened	Notes	Ward or City
↑Through service to Meitetsu Komaki Line↑
K01	Kamiiida	上飯田		Meitetsu Komaki Line	March 27, 2003		Kita-ku
K02	Heian-dori	平安通		Meijō Line	March 27, 2003		Kita-ku
