= Motoyama, Nagoya =

District in Chikusa-ku, Nagoya, Nagoya Prefecture, Japan

Coordinates: 35°9′50.5″N 136°57′49″E

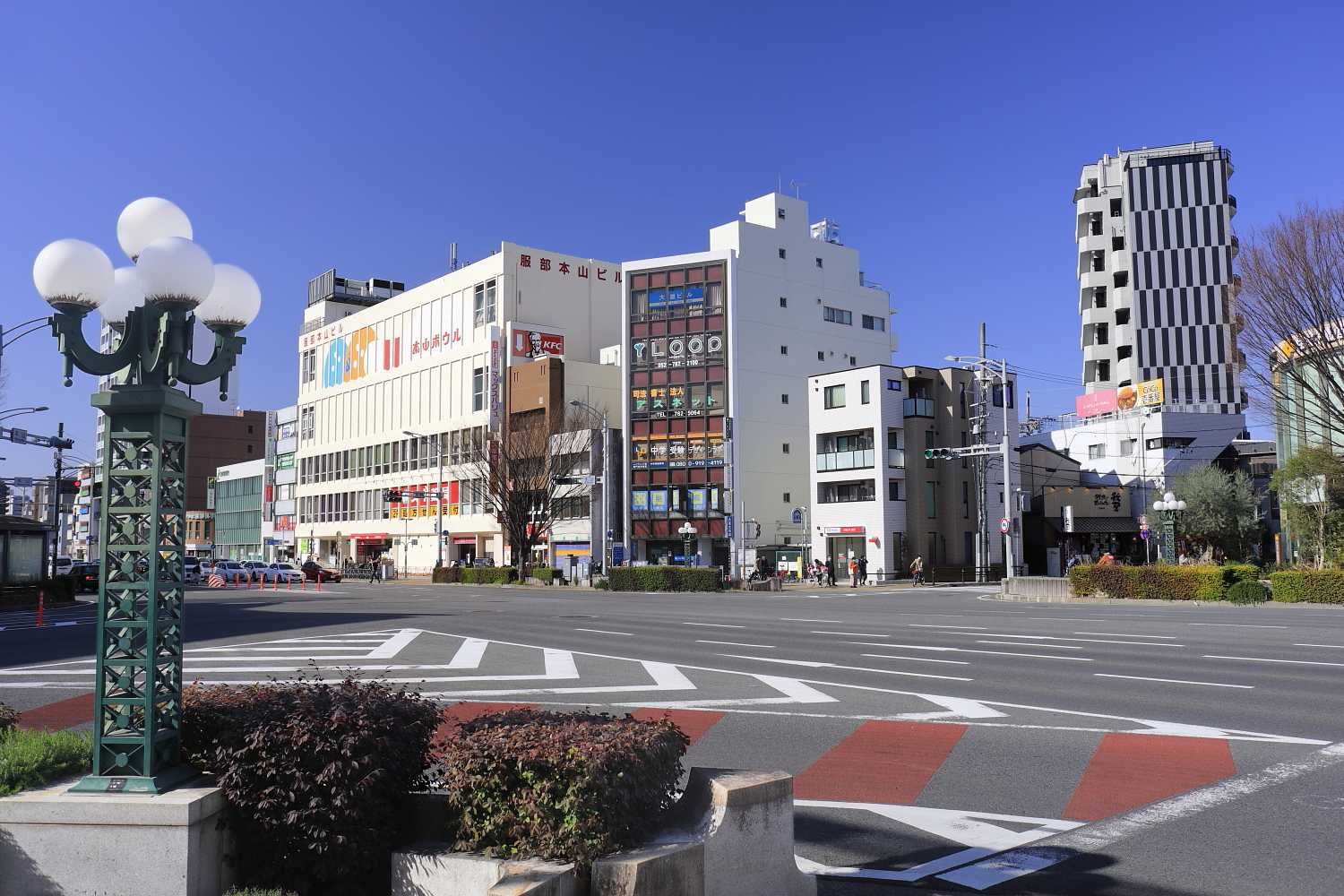
Motoyama Intersection

Motoyama (本山) is a district in Chikusa-ku (千種区), a ward in the east of Nagoya City. It is located between Higashiyama and Kakuozan, and is close to both Nagoya University and Higashiyama-Koen Park (東山公園).

== Transportation ==
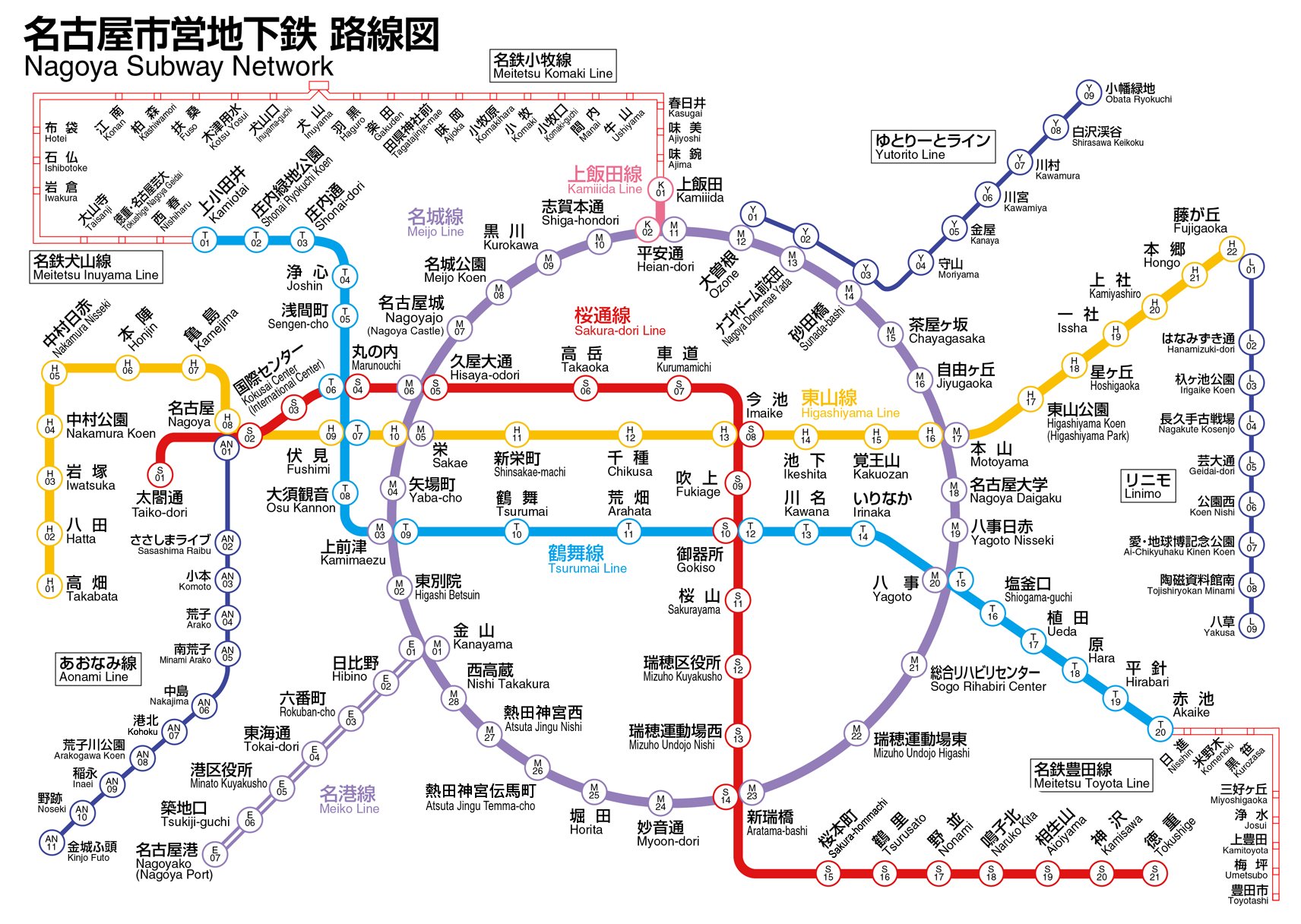
Nagoya subway map (does not include JR Central lines)

At the heart of Motoyama is a traffic intersection, underneath which the Higashiyama and Meijo Lines of the Nagoya City Subway (地下鉄) cross each other.

There are six entrances/exits to the subway station at Motoyama station.

Motoyama Station (本山駅) has 4 floors; The Higashiyama Line is located on the third floor, and the Meijo Line is located on the fourth floor of the subway station.

== Culture ==
Motoyama features tourist attractions, English friendly cuisine, and foreigner-friendly temples.

=== Sight Seeing ===
Higashiyama Zoo is a Botanical Gardens and Zoo combined, within the heart of suburbia, located next to Motoyama and Hoshigaoka. Higashiyama Zoo and Botanical Gardens is a major attraction within Japan, as it is the only place in Japan that is home to Koalas.

=== Temples ===
Togan-ji Temple is located one street from the main intersection of Motoyama. It is considered the "hidden gem" of nagoya. Togan-ji Temple boasts a 100 ft high Green statue of buddha, that is known as "the great buddha.

In the Motoyama area there is a Matsuzakaya department store (松坂屋), various restaurants and fast food outlets, karaoke and an interesting and tourist-free Buddhist temple (Tōgan-ji), home to Nagoya's largest seated Buddha statue.

Yotsuya-dori (四谷通) stretches from Motoyama station in the direction of the university, and houses a number of clothing outlets, as well as a large branch of Mujirushi Ryohin (Muji - 無印良品)

Motoyama is also famous for many so called zakka stores. On the Yotsuya-dori side of Motoyama are Plus and Mizuiro. On the opposite side around nekogahora-dori there are Hulot, Sahan, and the cafe Millou. Recently the zakka stores Moka, Ming Ming, and the zakka cafe Myshica have closed.

Motoyama is around 8 minutes by subway from the downtown Sakae area (栄), and around 15 minutes from Nagoya Station, popularly abbreviated to Meieki (名駅), with JR, Meitetsu, Kintetsu and shinkansen services to all of Central Japan and beyond
