= Shōwa =

Shōwa most commonly refers to:

- Hirohito (1901–1989), the 124th Emperor of Japan, known posthumously as Emperor Shōwa
  - Shōwa era (昭和), the era of Hirohito from 1926 to 1989
- Showa Corporation, a Japanese suspension and shock manufacturer, affiliated with the Honda keiretsu

Shōwa may also refer to:

== Japanese eras ==
- Jōwa (Heian period) (承和), alternatively read as Shōwa, from 834 to 848
- Shōwa (Kamakura period) (正和), from 1312 to 1317

== Japanese places ==
- Shōwa, Akita, a former town in Akita Prefecture
- Shōwa, Yamanashi, a town in Yamanashi Prefecture
- Shōwa, a former town in Tokyo, now part of Akishima, Tokyo
- Shōwa-ku, a ward of Nagoya, Aichi Prefecture
- Shōwa, Fukushima, a village in Fukushima Prefecture
- Shōwa, Gunma, a village in Gunma Prefecture
- Shōwa, Saitama, a dissolved town in Saitama Prefecture
- Showa Station (Antarctica), a Japanese research station located in Antarctica
- Shōwa Station (Kanagawa), a Japanese railway station in Kanagawa Prefecture

== Japanese educational institutions ==
- Showa University, in Tokyo
- Showa Women's University, in Tokyo
- Showa Pharmaceutical University (昭和薬科大学 Shōwa Yakka Daigaku), in Tokyo
- Showa Academia Musicae (昭和音楽大学 Shōwa Ongaku Daigaku), in Atsugi, Kanagawa Prefecture
- Showa Museum of Art (昭和美術館 Shōwa Bijitsukan), in Nagoya

== Japanese companies ==
- Showa Aircraft Industry, a Japanese aircraft company
- Showa Denko, a Japanese chemical company
- Showa Shell Sekiyu, former Japanese subsidiary of the Shell petroleum company
- Showa Steel Works, former Japanese steel mill

== Other uses ==
- Showa (fish), a variety of ornamental koi (carp)
- Showa: A History of Japan, a manga by Shigeru Mizuki
- Shōwa Modan, an art style
- Showa/Nakajima L2D, a model of Japanese aircraft
- Shewa, also spelled Showa, a region of Ethiopia
- Showa Era, the series of Godzilla movies ranging from 1954 to 1975.
- Shōwa, an album by The Gerogerigegege
- Shōwa, an album by Haruko Momoi
