= Nanzan University =

University in Japan

Coordinates: 35.1481°N 136.963°E

- 南山大学
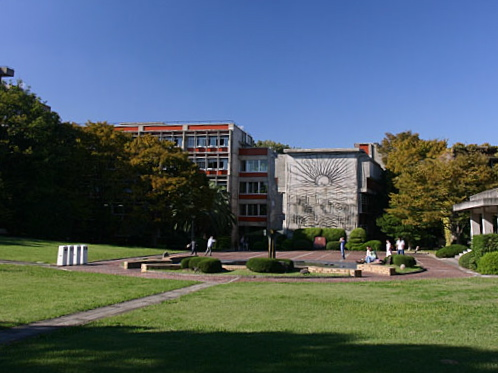
- Former name: Nanzan College of Foreign Languages (1946-1949)
- Motto: Hominis Dignitati (人間の尊厳のために, Ningen no Songen no Tame ni)
- Motto in English: For human dignity
- Type: Private Roman Catholic Research Non-profit Coeducational Basic and Higher education institution
- Established: 1946
- Founders: Fr. Joseph Reiners, SVD
- Affiliations: Nanzan Gakuen
- Religious affiliation: Roman Catholic (Divine Word Missionaries)
- Academic affiliations: ASEACCU ACUCA
- President: Rev.Fr.Robert Kisala, SVD
- Faculty: 348
- Students: 9,199
- Undergraduates: 9,020
- Postgraduates: 179
- Location: Nagoya, Aichi Prefecture, Japan
- Campus: Urban/Suburban
- Website: http://www.nanzan-u.ac.jp/English/index.htm

Nanzan University (南山大学, Nanzan daigaku) is a private, Catholic and coeducational higher education institution run by the Society of the Divine Word (SVD) in the Shōwa Ward of Nagoya City, Aichi Prefecture, Japan. It is considered to be one of the most prestigious private universities in the Chūbu region.

== History ==
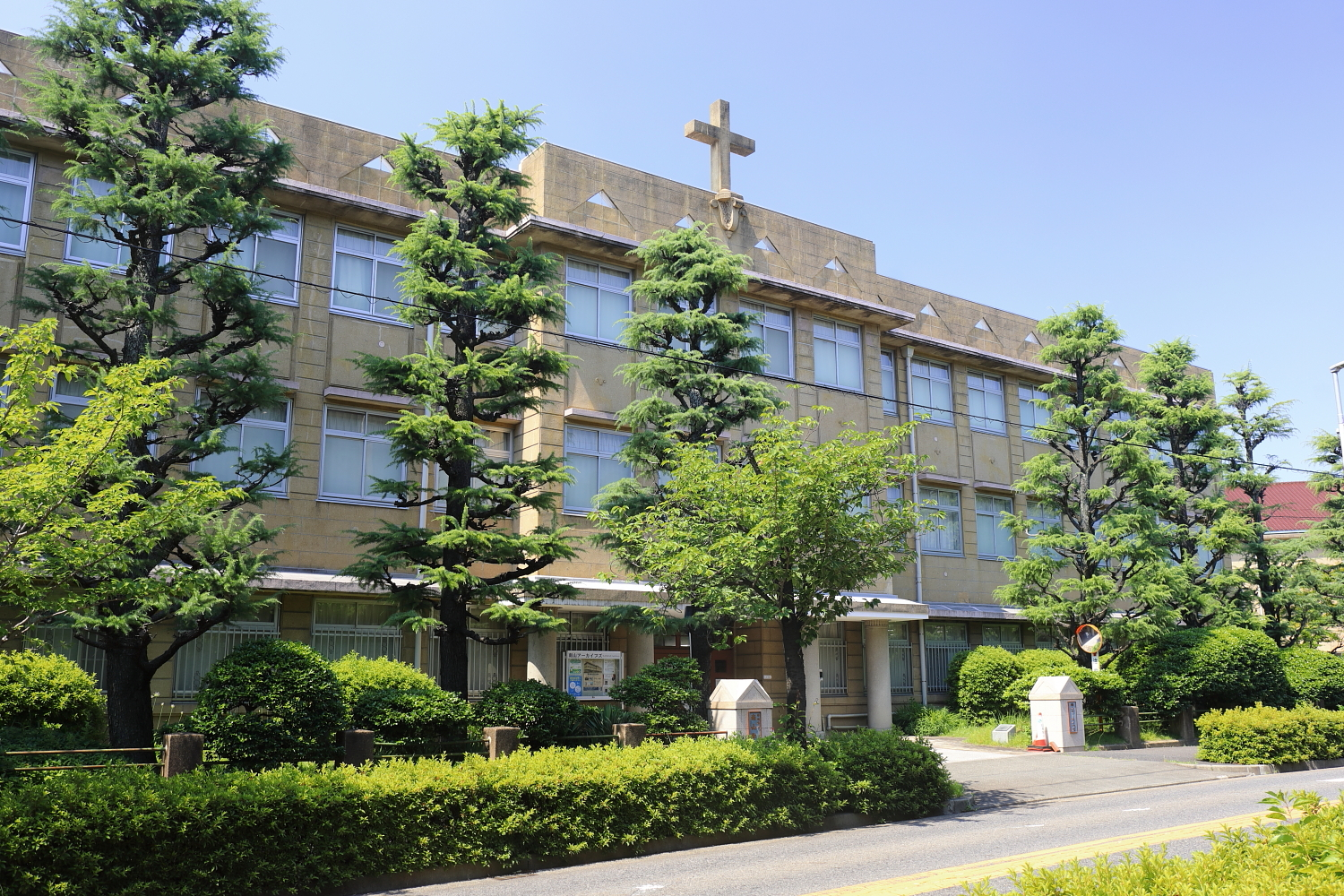
Nanzan Gakuen Reiners Auditorium

Nanzan is named after the forested mountains near Goken'ya-chō (五軒家町), known as Minamiyama (南山), which literally means "southern mountain". The on reading for "南山" is Nanzan. Also, in Chinese poetry "南山" refers to Mount Lushan until the Tang dynasty and Mount Zhongnan thereafter. Notably, the word appears in the classical poetry collection Shi Jing and the works of famous poet Li Bai. Thus, the choice of name is a celebration of longevity, perseverance, and prosperity for both the school and its alumni.

Divine Word Missionary Josef Reiners founded Nanzan Junior High School in 1932. Nanzan Foreign Language School was added to the Nanzan system in 1946. Later, as the Society of the Divine Word appointed Rev. Ralph Thyken, the American representative of Fu Jen Catholic University, to Japan to participate in the establishment of a new Nagoya Catholic University, and Nanzan Foreign Language School was formally renamed Nanzan University in 1949.

Located to the east of the campus is the Divine Word Seminary Chapel, constructed in 1962. This is a building that exploits the plastic capacity of concrete, with two intersecting shells forming a bell tower. These are punctured with vertical slots which allow light to radiate along the curved interior walls.

Nanzan Junior College (南山短期大学, Nanzan Tanki Daigaku) opened in 1968 as a women's junior college affiliated with the university. In 2011 the junior college campus was closed and reorganized as a department on Nanzan University's Nagoya campus offering courses in English language.

In 1995, Nagoya Seirei Junior College was subsumed by Nanzan when the two schools' organizations merged. In 2008, Nanzan planned to open an elementary school, officially named Nanzan University Affiliated Elementary School.

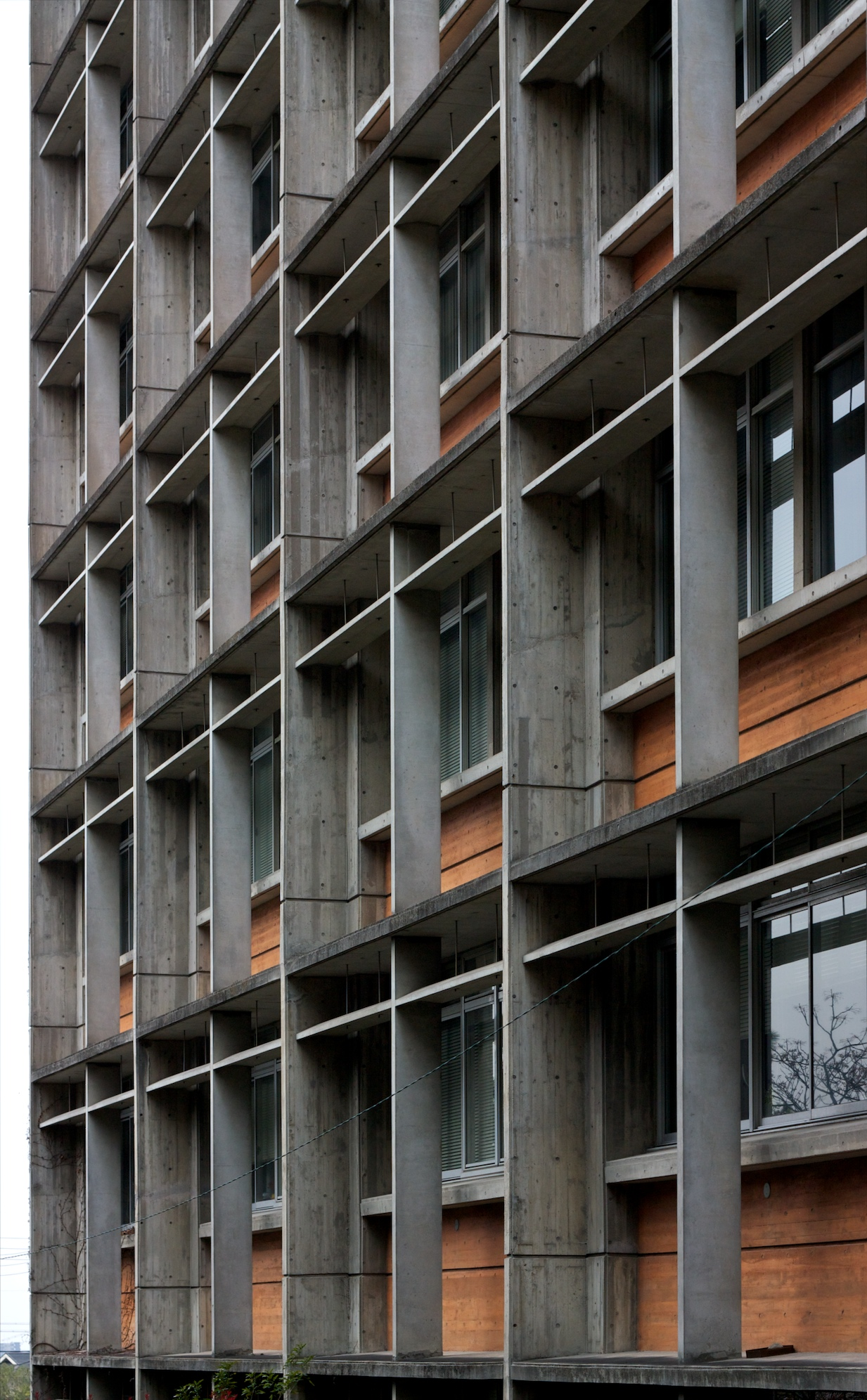
Detail of one of the buildings designed by Raymond

The campus was designed by Antonin Raymond (1988-1976), a Czech-born architect who studied under Frank Lloyd Wright in the United States and was sent to oversee construction of Wright's Tokyo Imperial Hotel; he stayed in the country and became one of the fathers of modern architecture in Japan. In 1961, Raymond was commissioned to design most buildings on the Nagoya campus. It was one of the largest projects that he would undertake. The campus was orientated on a north–south axis across rolling hills and the eight buildings were arranged to suit the typography and harmonise with the landscape. In-situ concrete is used throughout the scheme and each building has its own concrete form, some with pilotis, others with shells.

== Organization ==
Nanzan University is part of Nanzan School Corporation (南山学園, Nanzan gakuen), an educational complex of four high schools, and the university itself. Among coeducational universities, Nanzan is the only Catholic missionary school in the Chūbu region.

Nanzan has an active study abroad program with over 100 partner universities around the world. The Center for Japanese Studies opened in 1974, and is now one of the most prestigious Japanese language programs in Japan, accepting over 300 students a year into its fall, spring and summer programs.

For many years, Nanzan has held an annual competition with its Catholic sister schools Sophia University (上智大学, Jōchi daigaku) primarily focusing on athletics. Combining the first two syllables in Japanese of the respective schools, the Nanzan-Sophia event is known as the Jōnan-sen (上南戦).

The humanities department offers priest training courses through its Christian studies curriculum.

=== Campus ===
Nanzan's campus is in Yagoto, in the eastern part of Nagoya, in Shōwa-ku. The campus is about a 10-minute walk from either Nagoya Daigaku (名古屋大学) or Yagoto Nisseki (八事日赤) station on the Nagoya Municipal Subway's Meijō Line. Alternately, campus is a 15-minute walk from Irinaka (いりなか) on the subway's Tsurumai Line.

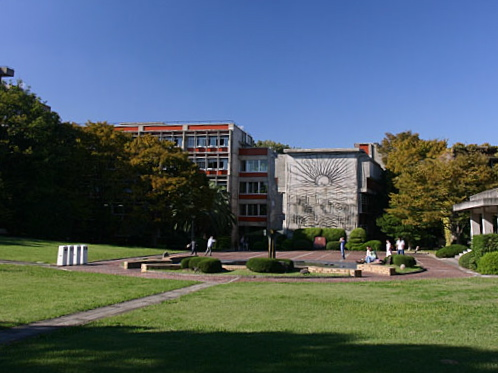
Main campus in Nagoya

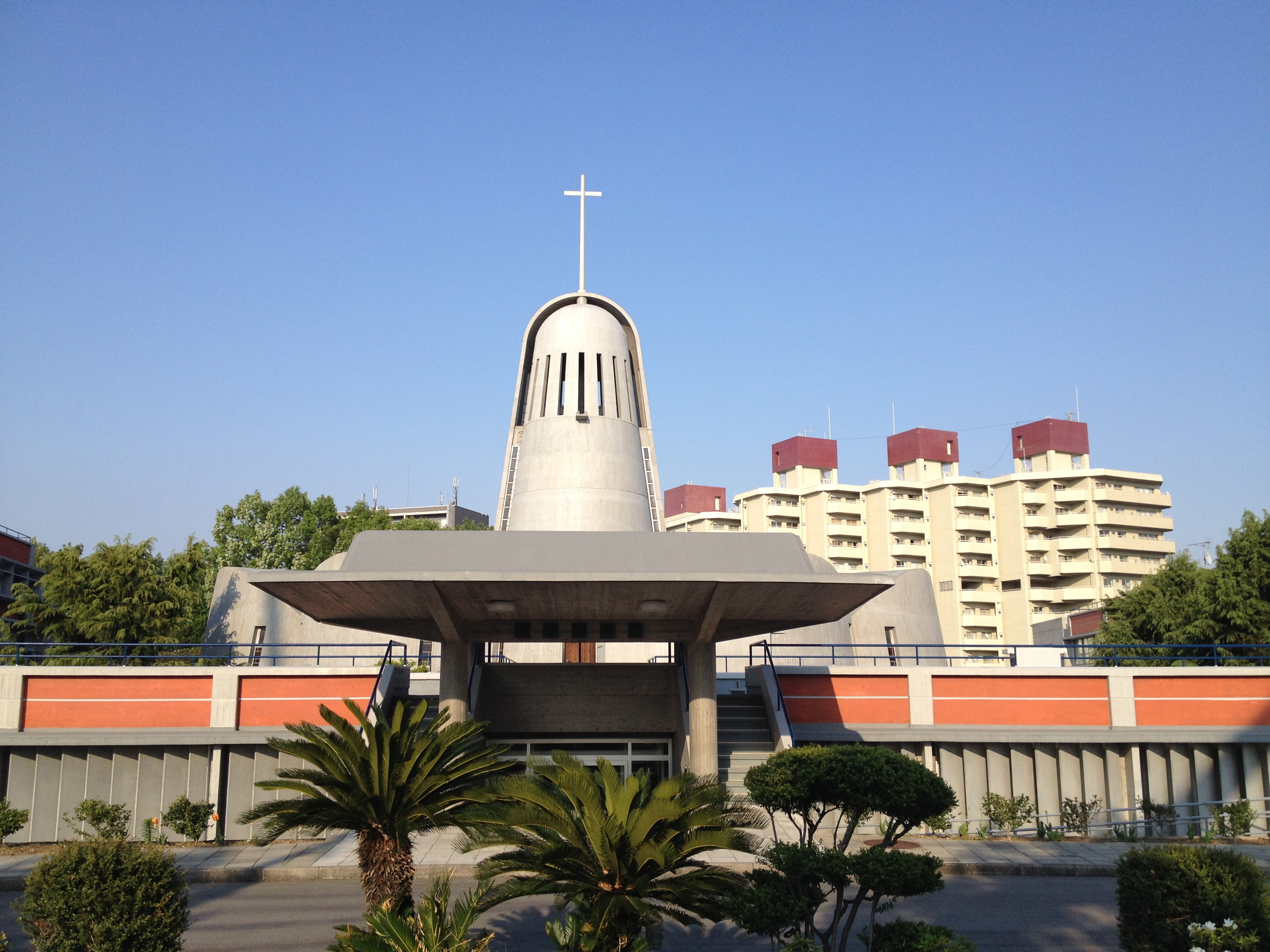
The Divine Word Seminary Chapel, constructed in 1962 by Antonin Raymond

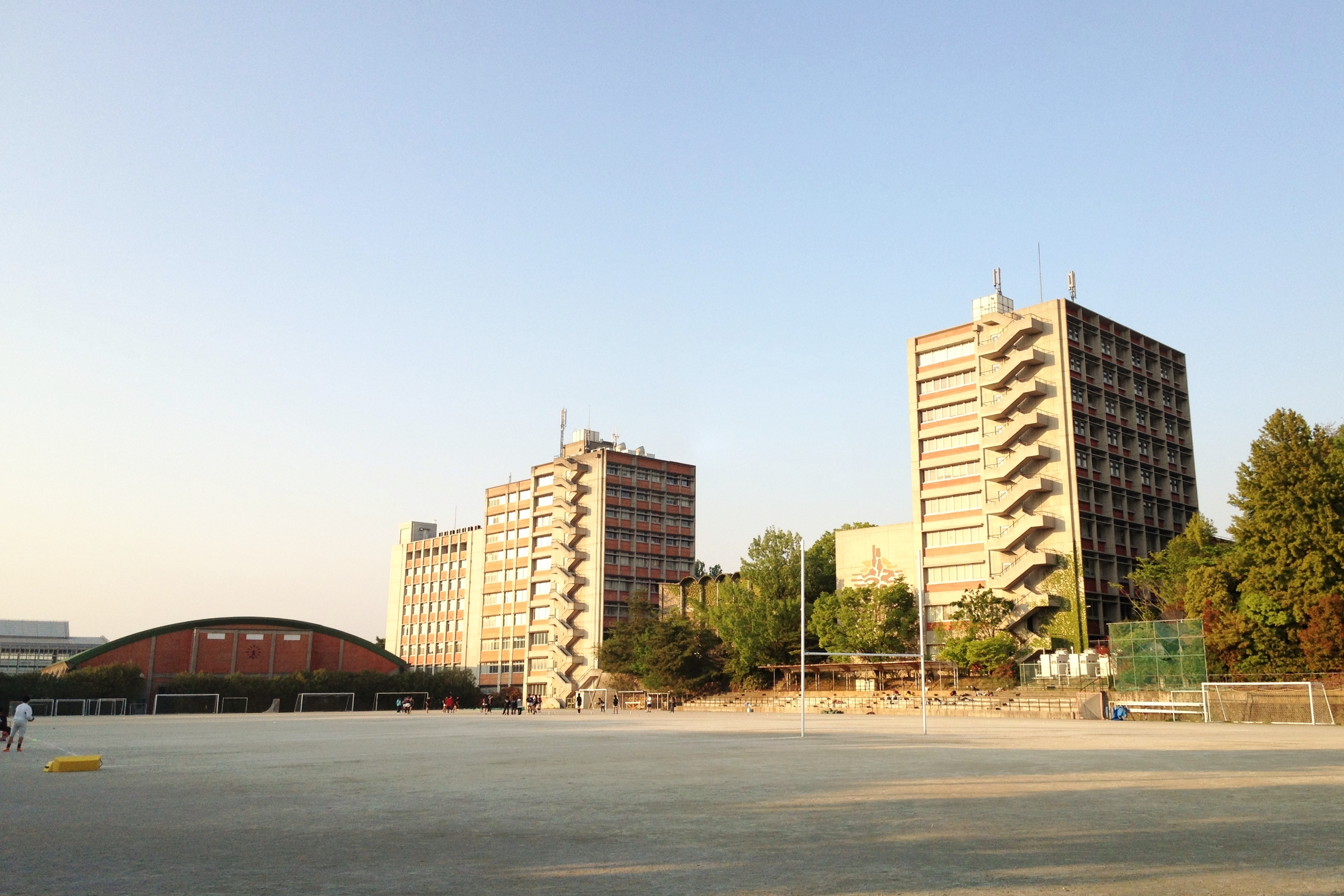
Sports ground on campus

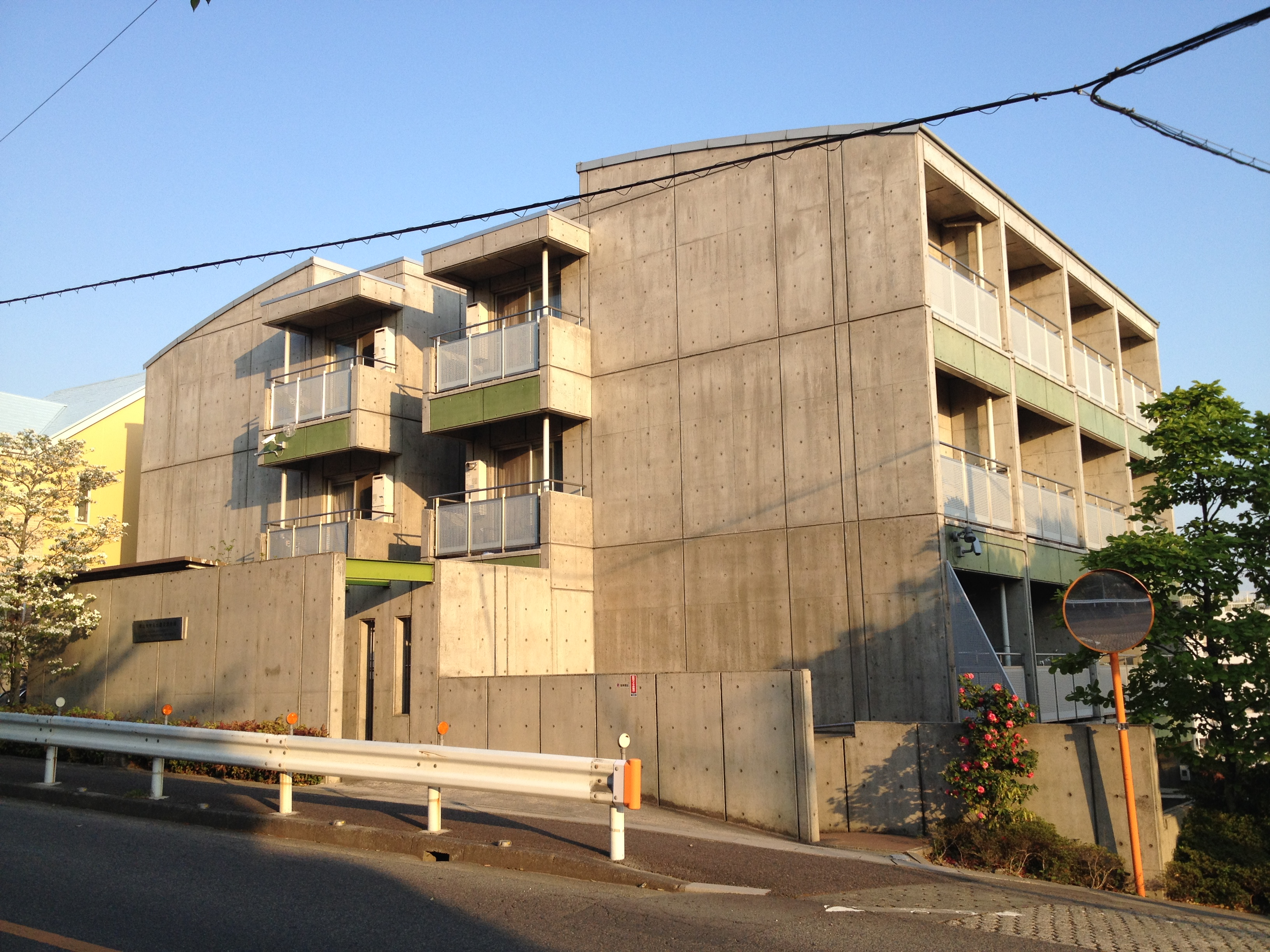
International Student House

=== Faculties and departments ===
- Faculty of Humanities
  - Department of Christian Studies
  - Department of Anthropology and Philosophy
  - Department of Psychology and Human Relations
  - Department of Japanese Studies
- Faculty of Foreign Studies
  - Department of British and American Studies
  - Department of Spanish and Latin American Studies
  - Department of French Studies
  - Department of German Studies
  - Department of Asian Studies
- Faculty of Economics
  - Department of Economics
- Faculty of Business Administration
  - Department of Business Administration
- Faculty of Law
  - Department of Law
- Faculty of Policy Studies
  - Department of Policy Studies
- Faculty of Science and Technology
  - Department of Software Engineering
  - Department of Data Science
  - Department of Electronics and Communication Technology
  - Department of Mechanical Engineering and System Control
- Faculty of Global Liberal Studies
  - Department of Global Liberal Studies

=== Graduate schools and programs ===
- Graduate School of Humanities
  - Graduate Program in Christian Thought
  - Graduate Program in Religious Thought
  - Graduate Program in Anthropology
  - Graduate Program in Educational Facilitation
  - Graduate Program in Linguistic Science
- Graduate School of International Area Studies
  - Graduate Program in International Area Studies
- Graduate School of Social Sciences
  - Graduate Program in Economics
  - Graduate Program in Management
  - Graduate Program in Policy Studies
- Graduate School of Law
  - Graduate Program in Law
- Graduate School of Sciences and Engineering
  - Graduate Program of Software Engineering
  - Graduate Program of Data Science
  - Graduate Program of Electronics and Communication Technology
  - Graduate Program of Mechanical Engineering and System Control
  - Graduate Program of Mechatronics
- Nanzan School of Law
  - Graduate Program in Legal Practice

== Notable alumni and students ==
- Ryohei, R&B singer.
- Masato Hayakawa, frontman of rock band Coldrain.
- Home Made Kazoku, hip hop trio.
- Sakon Yamamoto, racecar driver (currently enrolled).
- Kazuki Nakajima, racecar driver (currently enrolled).

== Affiliations ==
Nanzan is a member of the ASEACCU (Association of Southeast and East Asian Catholic Colleges and Universities), an organization of Catholic institutes of higher learning in the Philippines, Australia, Thailand, Taiwan, South Korea, Indonesia and Japan. In addition to Nanzan, there are seven other Japanese members, including Sophia.

=== Sister schools ===
- Sophia University

=== Associated schools ===
- Nanzan Elementary School
- Nanzan Boys' Junior and Senior High School
- Nanzan Girls' Junior and Senior High School
- Seirei Girls' Junior and Senior High School
- Misono Jogakuin Junior and Senior High School
- Misono Kindergarten
- Misono Maria Kindergarten

== See also ==
Close by to the main campus is the Showa Museum of Art.
