= Kuwayama Art Museum =

Museum in Nagoya, Aichi, Japan

Coordinates: 35.1484°N 136.9535°E

- 桑山美術館
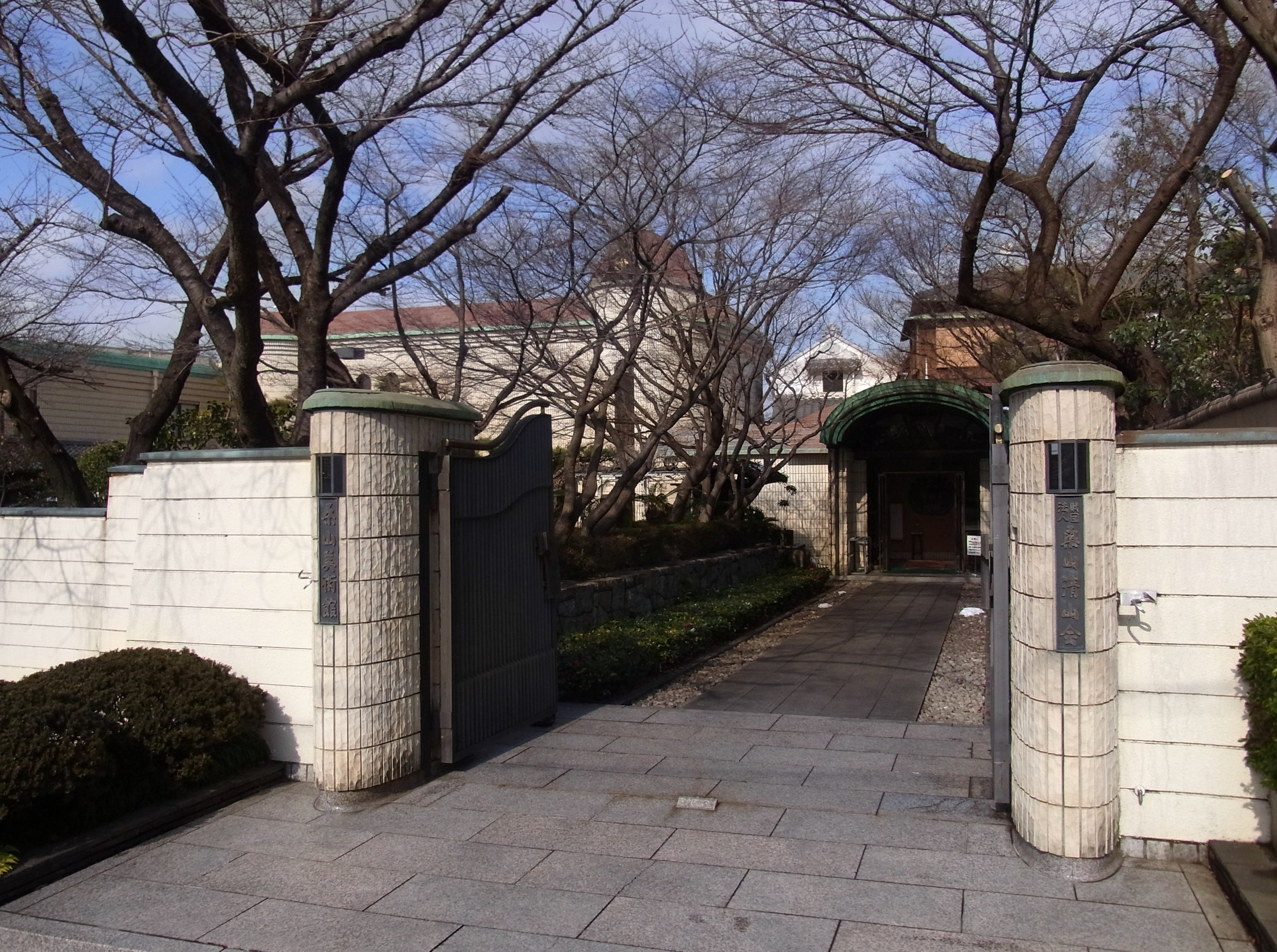
- Location: Shōwa-ku, Nagoya, Aichi, Japan
- Type: Museum

The Kuwayama Art Museum (桑山美術館 Kuwayama Bijitsukan) is a private art museum located in Yamanaka district, Shōwa-ku, Nagoya, Aichi Prefecture, Japan.

It exhibits Japanese ceramics and paintings which were collected by the gallery's first director, Kuwayama Kiyokazu. The museum also has a multipurpose hall, a small garden and a chashitsu indoors and also outside.

Nearby is the Showa Museum of Art and the Nanzan University.
