= Gokiso Station =

Metro station in Nagoya, Japan

Coordinates: 35.1494°N 136.9344°E

S10 T12 Gokiso Station 御器所駅
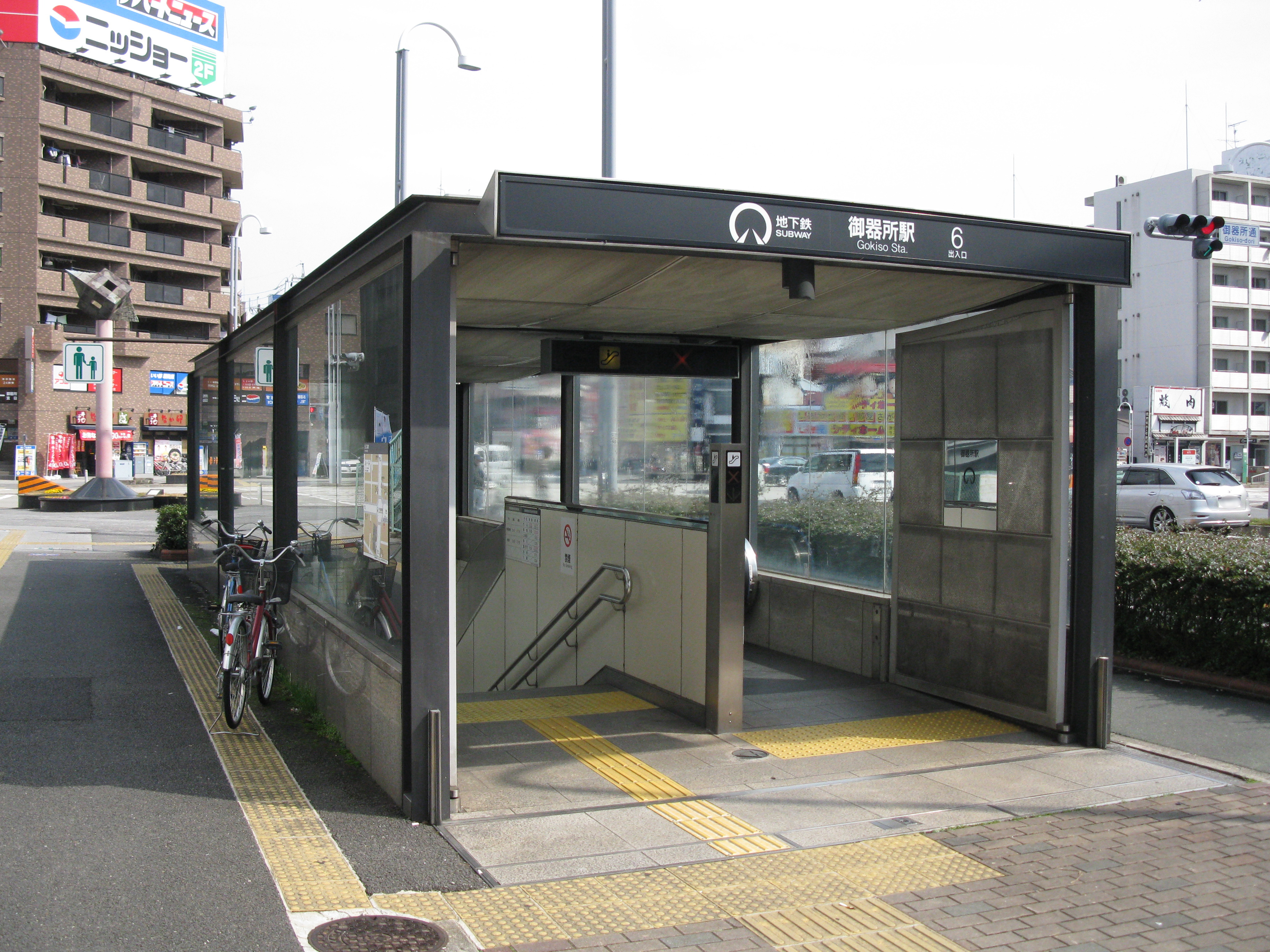
- Gokiso Station, 6th Entrance

General information
- Location: Gokisotōri 3–7, Shōwa, Nagoya, Aichi （名古屋市昭和区御器所通三丁目7） Japan
- System: Nagoya Municipal Subway station
- Operator: Transportation Bureau City of Nagoya
- Lines: Sakura-dōri Line; Tsurumai Line
- Connections: Bus terminal

Other information
- Station code: T12; S10

History
- Opened: 18 March 1977; 49 years ago

Passengers
- 2009: 10,329 daily

Services
Preceding station	Nagoya Municipal Subway	Following station
Fukiage S09 towards Taiko-dori	Sakura-dōri Line	Sakurayama S11 towards Tokushige
Arahata T11 towards Kami-Otai	Tsurumai Line	Kawana T13 towards Akaike
Location

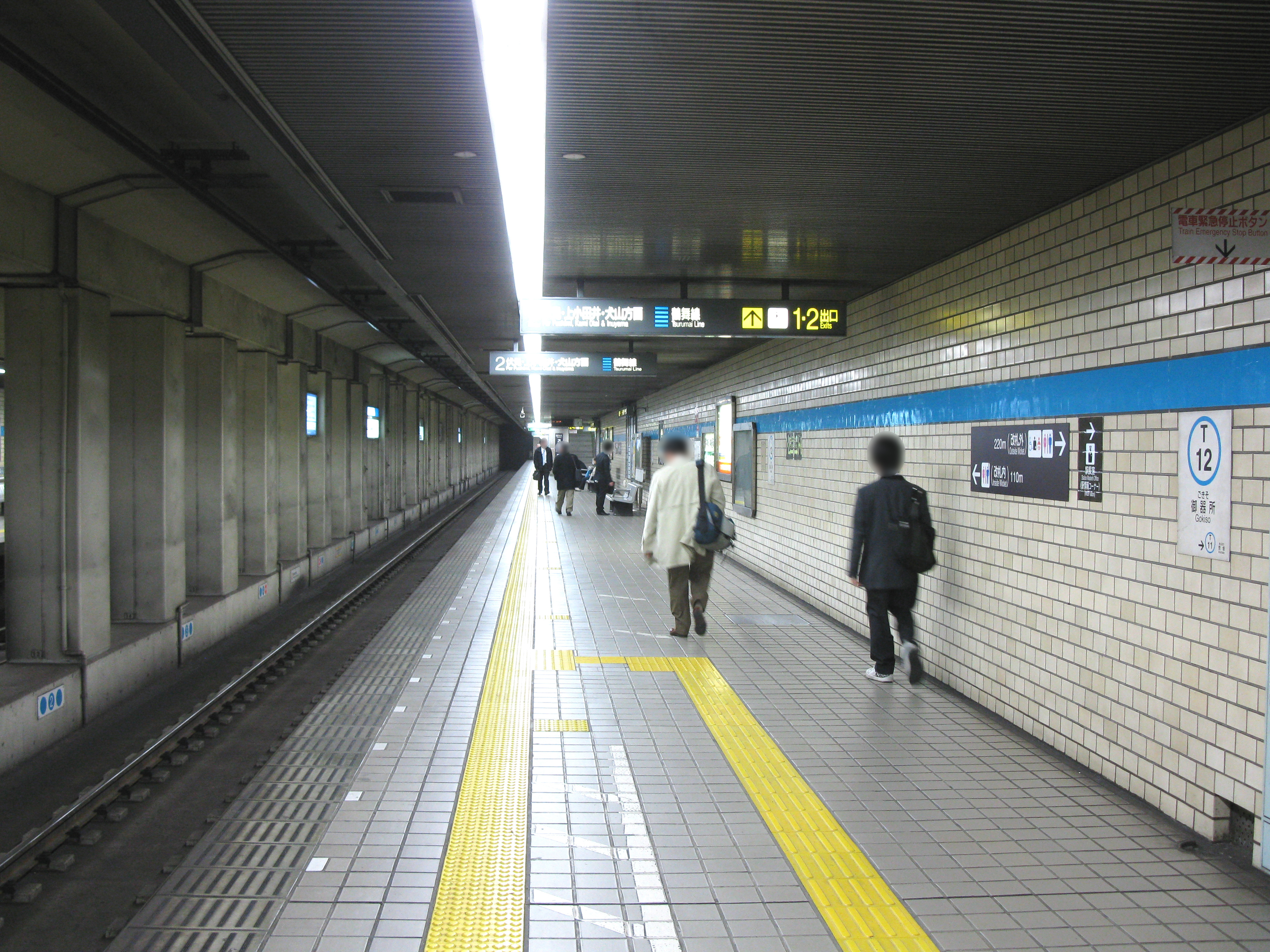
Station platform 2 of the Tsurumai Line towards Kami-Otai and Inuyama (2010)

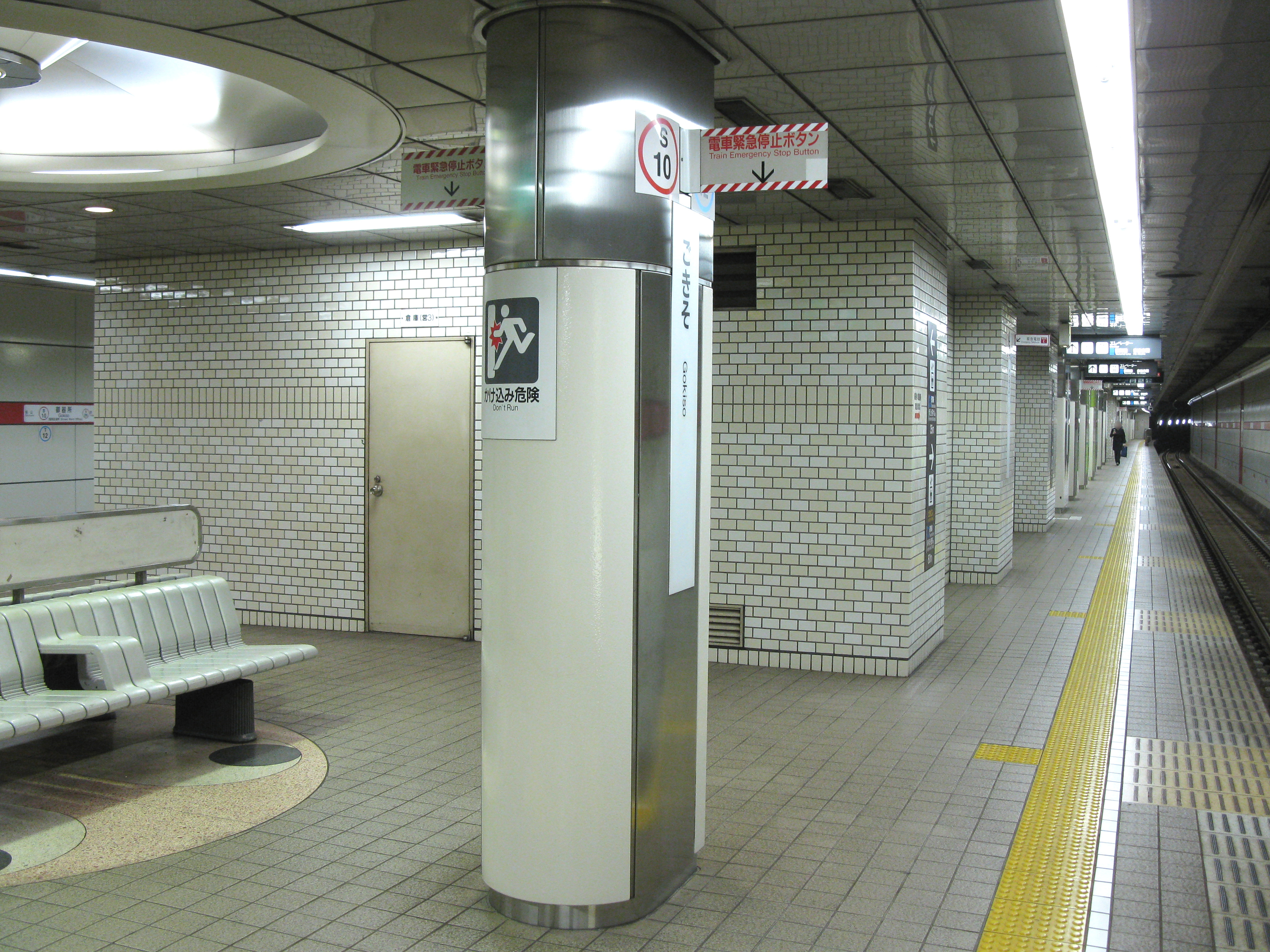
Station platform of the Sakura-dōri Line (2010)

Gokiso Station (御器所駅, Gokiso-eki) is an underground metro station located in Shōwa-ku, Nagoya, Aichi Prefecture, Japan operated by the Nagoya Municipal Subway's Tsurumai Line. The station is an interchange station between the Tsurumai Line and the Sakura-dōri Line and is located 11.9 km (7.4 mi) from the terminus of the Tsurumai Line at Kami-Otai Station and 8.4 km (5.2 mi) from the terminus of the Sakura-dōri Line at Taiko-dori Station.

== History ==
Gokiso Station was opened on 18 March 1977. The Sakura-dōri Line began operations to this station from 30 March 1994. Platform screen doors were installed on the Sakura-dōri Line platform from 28 May 2011.

== Lines ==
- Nagoya Municipal Subway
  - Tsurumai Line (Station number: T12)
  - Sakura-dōri Line (Station number: S10)

== Layout ==
Gokiso Station has two underground opposed side platforms for the Tsrumai Line and one underground island platform for the Sakura-dōri Line.

=== Platforms ===
1	■ Tsurumai Line	For Yagoto, Akaike, and Toyotashi
2	■ Tsurumai Line	For Fushimi, Kami-Otai, and Inuyama
3	■ Sakura-dōri Line	For Aratama-bashi and Tokushige
4	■ Sakura-dōri Line	For Imaike, Nagoya, and Taiko-dori
