= Shoa =

Shoa may refer to:

- The Holocaust, also known as "the Shoah" or Ha-Shoah in Hebrew
- Shewa, a region of Ethiopia, sometimes spelled Shoa
- Shoah (film), 1985 French documentary film about the Holocaust
- Amata shoa, a moth of the family Erebidae
- SHOA, Hydrographic and Oceanographic Service of the Chilean Navy

== See also ==
- Shuwa Arabic, also known as the Chaddian Arabic dialect or referred to the Baggara Arabs
- Shōwa, topics related to Japanese history and culture
