= Showa Museum of Art =

Museum in Nagoya, Aichi, Japan

Coordinates: 35.1403°N 136.9484°E

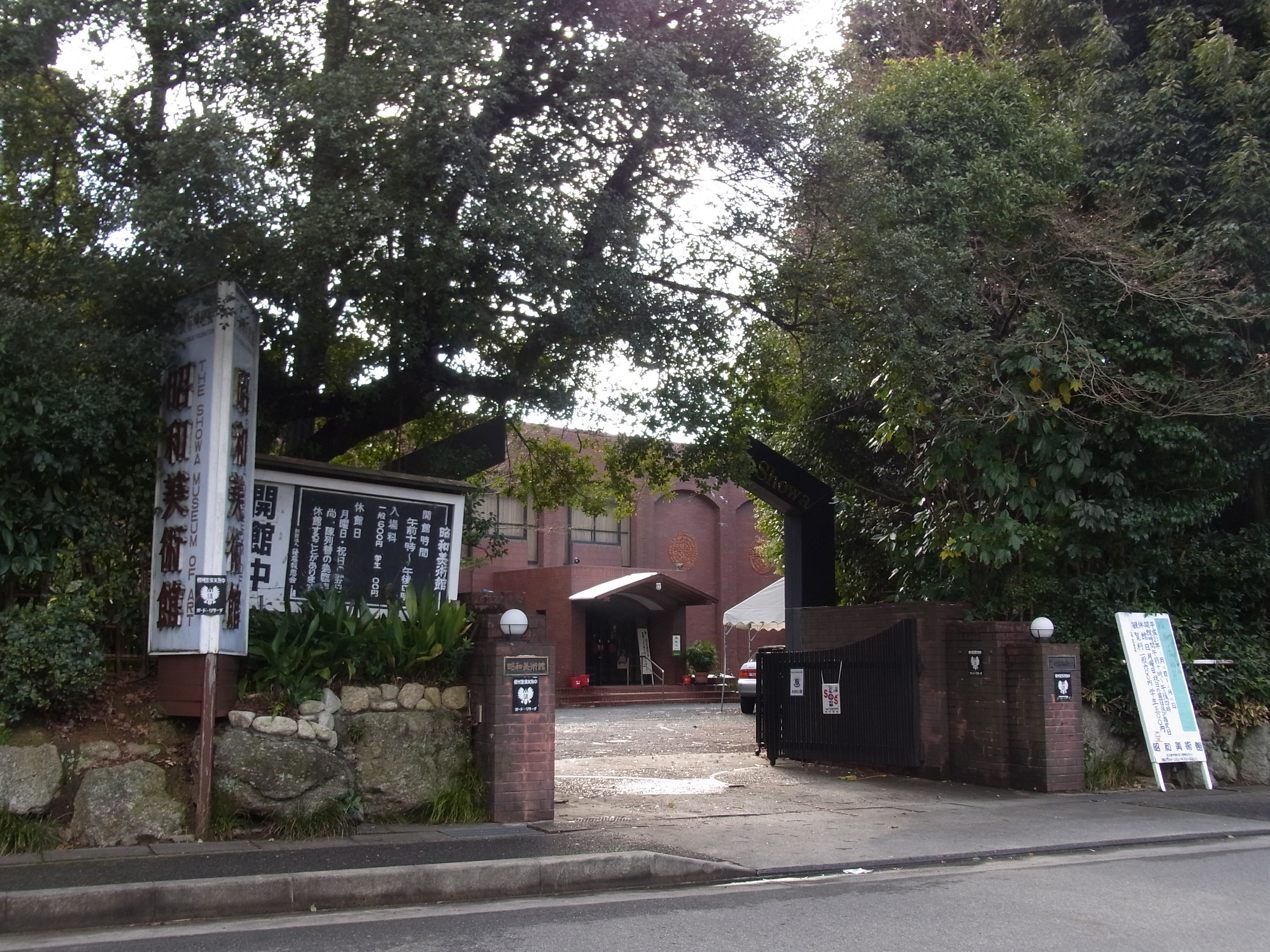
Showa Museum of Art in Nagoya

The Showa Museum of Art (昭和美術館 Shōwa Bijitsukan) is a private art museum located in the Shiomi district of Shōwa-ku, Nagoya, Aichi Prefecture, Japan.

== History ==
The collection is by the local Gifu-born businessman Kozo Goto (1881-1977). The museum was founded in 1978. It consists of many items of Japanese ceramics also used for Japanese tea ceremony, including three works designated as Important Cultural Properties and four works designated as Important Art Objects.

It is housed in his former residence and garden.

Nearby the museum is Nanzan University and the Kuwayama Art Museum.

== Accessibility ==
The nearest subway station is Irinaka Station.
