= Nagoya International Center =

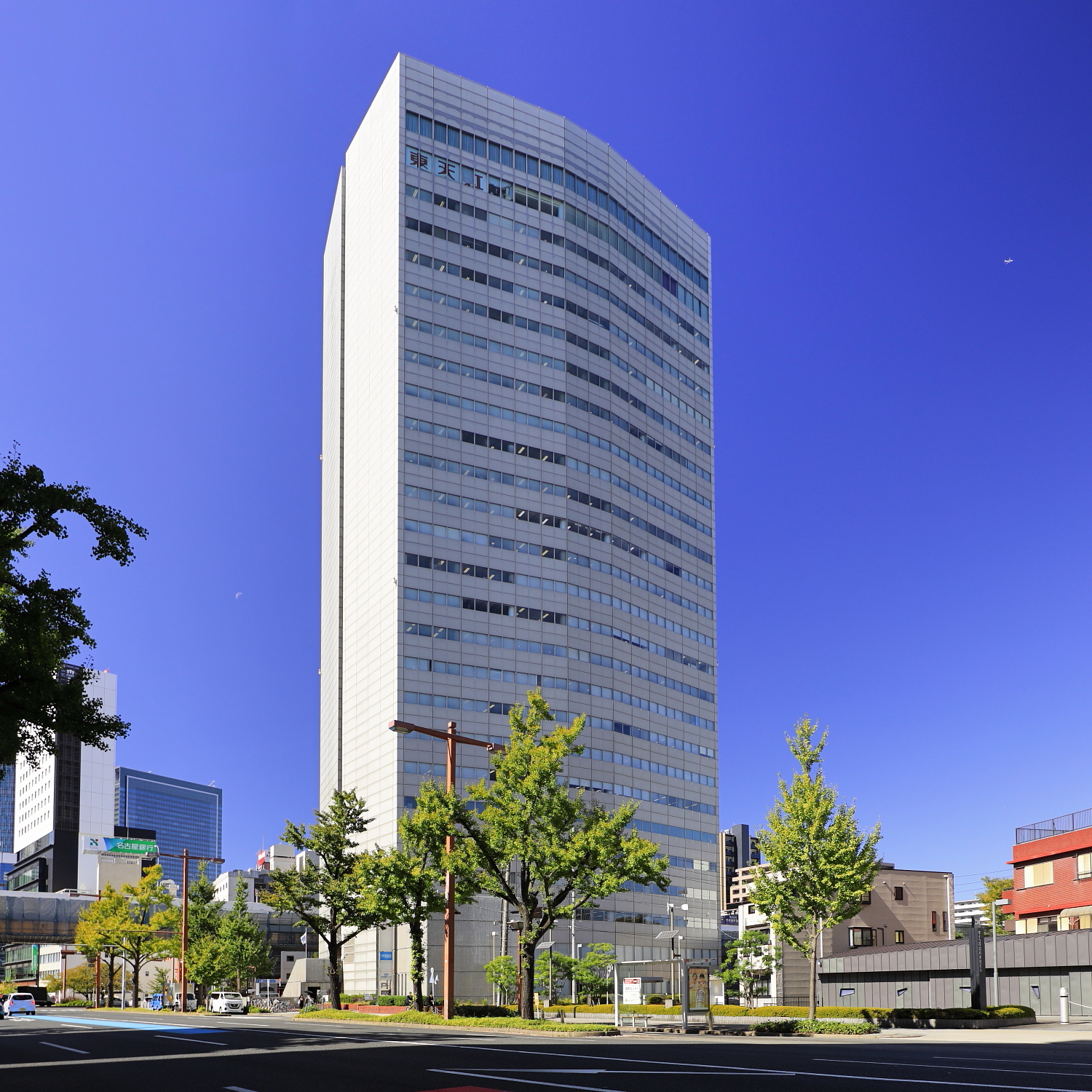
Nagoya International Center Building

The Nagoya International Center (Japanese: 名古屋国際センター Nagoya Kokusai Sentaa) is a non-profit organization based in Nakamura-ku, Nagoya, Japan. The center was established in 1984 and is known locally as the "NIC."

== Description ==
The center's facilities are located on the third to fifth floors of the Nagoya International Center Building, a 7-minute walk or a 2-minute subway ride from Nagoya Station. Kokusai Center Station, on the Nagoya City Subway, is linked to the Nagoya International Center at the basement level. The facilities that are open to the public free-of-charge include an information corner and a library with an extensive collection of foreign books--including over 10,000 English language books. There is a limited internet service in the 3F Information Counter, as well as a billboard where ads may be posted. Here, there are ads from people seeking a roommate/flatmate to live with, and people simply seeking to dispose of their accumulated possessions (a.k.a. sayonara sale) before they leave the country. Prior to January 2009, the board was also used to post individual ads by people seeking partners for language exchange as well as foreign exchange students seeking part-time employment, but these services are no longer offered. It is also possible to rent other facilities in the building itself.

The center organizes activities that promote multi-cultural exchange between the local communities and the somewhat transient foreigner population of the area. It also provides information and hosts free consultations services for foreign residents in 8 languages.

It publishes monthly newsletters in English and Portuguese (The Nagoya Calendar); content includes event listings, classifieds section, advice column, and daily living information. The Center also runs Japanese language classes for foreign residents, a home-stay program, a taiko drumming class, a children's soccer school, and a school visit program. It is an ideal information hub for first-time foreign visitors to Nagoya as it is possible to avail of information regarding the must-see, must-visit attractions in the region.
