= Nagoya Daigaku Station =

Metro station in Nagoya, Japan

Coordinates: 35.1544°N 136.9664°E

M18 Nagoya Daigaku Station 名古屋大学駅
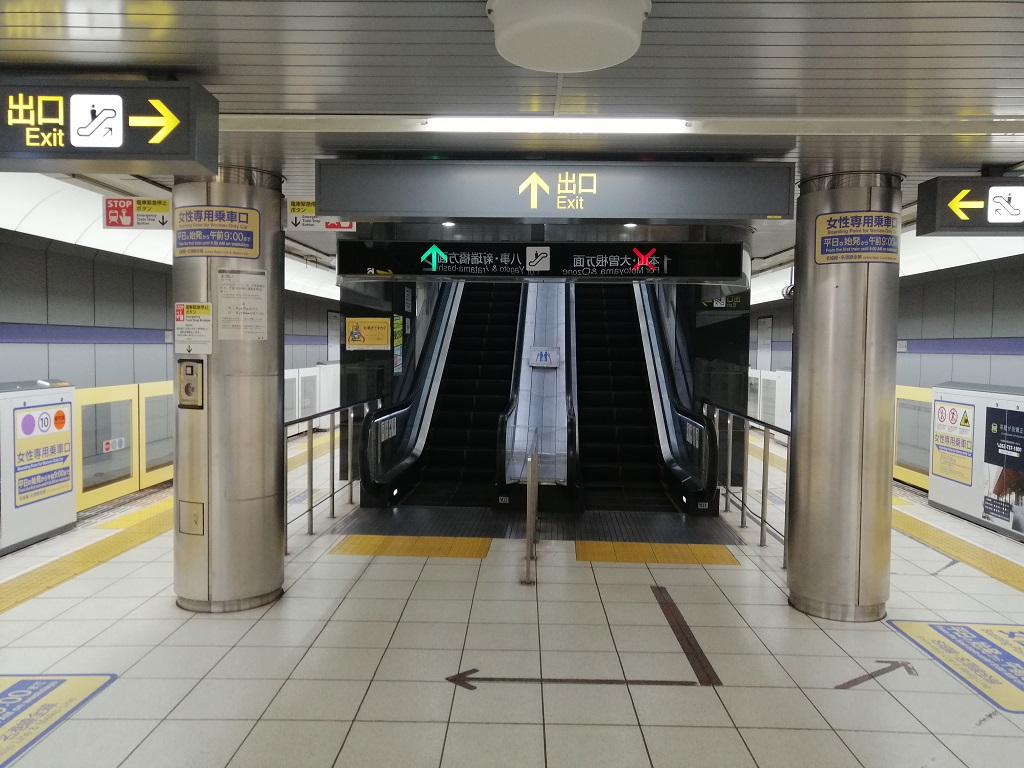

General information
- Location: Yotsuyadōri 20, Chikusa, Nagoya, Aichi （名古屋市千種区四谷通20） Japan
- System: Nagoya Municipal Subway station
- Operator: Transportation Bureau City of Nagoya
- Line: Meijō Line
- Connections: Bus stop

Other information
- Station code: M18

History
- Opened: 13 December 2003; 22 years ago

Passengers
- 2008: 9,583 daily

Services
Preceding station	Nagoya Municipal Subway	Following station
Motoyama M17 anticlockwise	Meijō Line	Yagoto Nisseki M19 clockwise
Location

Nagoya Daigaku Station (名古屋大学駅, Nagoya Daigaku-eki, lit. "Nagoya University") is a railway station in Chikusa-ku, Nagoya, Aichi Prefecture, Japan.

It was opened on 13 December 2003; 22 years ago.

This station provides access to the Higashiyama campus of Nagoya University, which is the station's namesake, and the Nagoya campus of Nanzan University.

== Lines ==
- Nagoya Municipal Subway
  - Meijō Line (Station number: M18)

== Layout ==
=== Platforms ===
1	■ Meijō Line	For Motoyama and Ōzone
2	■ Meijō Line	For Yagoto and Aratama-bashi
