= Kakuōzan Station =

Metro station in Nagoya, Japan

Coordinates: 35.1666°N 136.9535°E

H15 Kakuōzan Station 覚王山駅
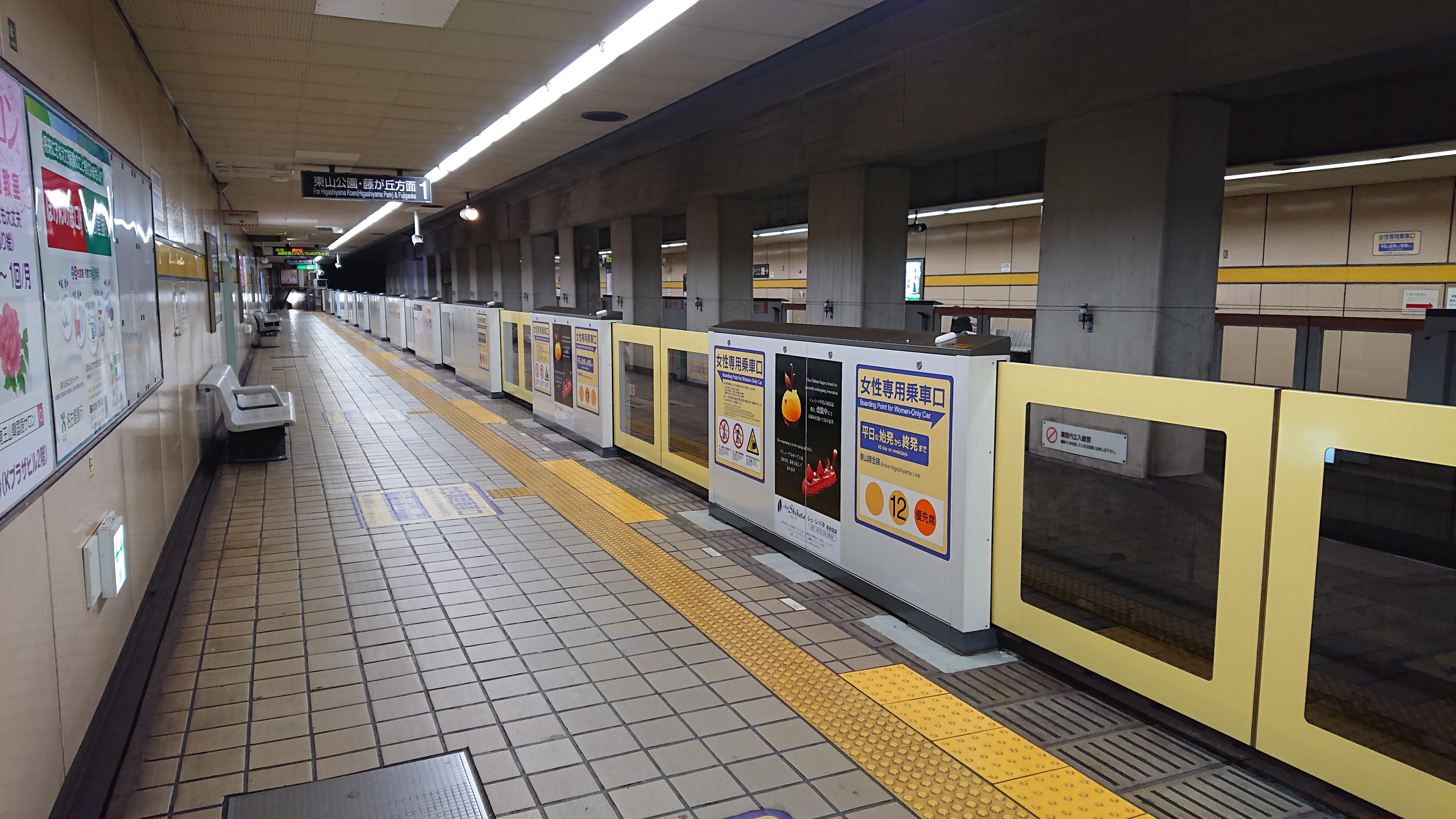

General information
- Location: Suemoritōri 1-7, Chikusa, Nagoya, Aichi （名古屋市千種区末盛通一丁目7） Japan
- System: Nagoya Municipal Subway station
- Operator: Transportation Bureau City of Nagoya
- Line: Higashiyama Line
- Connections: Bus stop

Other information
- Station code: H15

History
- Opened: 1 April 1963; 63 years ago

Passengers
- 2009: 8,838 daily

Services
Preceding station	Nagoya Municipal Subway	Following station
Ikeshita H14 towards Takabata	Higashiyama Line	Motoyama H16 towards Fujigaoka
Location

Kakuōzan Station (覚王山駅, Kakuōzan-eki) is an underground metro station located in Chikusa-ku, Nagoya, Aichi Prefecture, Japan operated by the Nagoya Municipal Subway's Higashiyama Line. It is located 13.2 rail kilometers from the terminus of the Higashiyama Line at Takabata Station.

== History ==
Kakuōzan Station was opened on 1 April 1963. The wicket gates were automated to use the Manaca smart card system from 11 February 2011.

This station serves part of the upper class district of Nagoya and is near Kakuōzan Nittai-ji Buddhist temple.

== Lines ==
- Nagoya Municipal Subway
  - Higashiyama Line (Station number: H15)

== Layout ==
Kakuōzan Station has two underground opposed side platforms.

=== Platforms ===
1	■ Higashiyama Line	For Higashiyama Kōen and Fujigaoka
2	■ Higashiyama Line	For Sakae, Nagoya, and Takabata
