= Marunouchi Station (Nagoya) =

Metro station in Nagoya, Japan

Coordinates: 35.1733°N 136.897°E

S04 T06 Marunouchi Station 丸の内駅
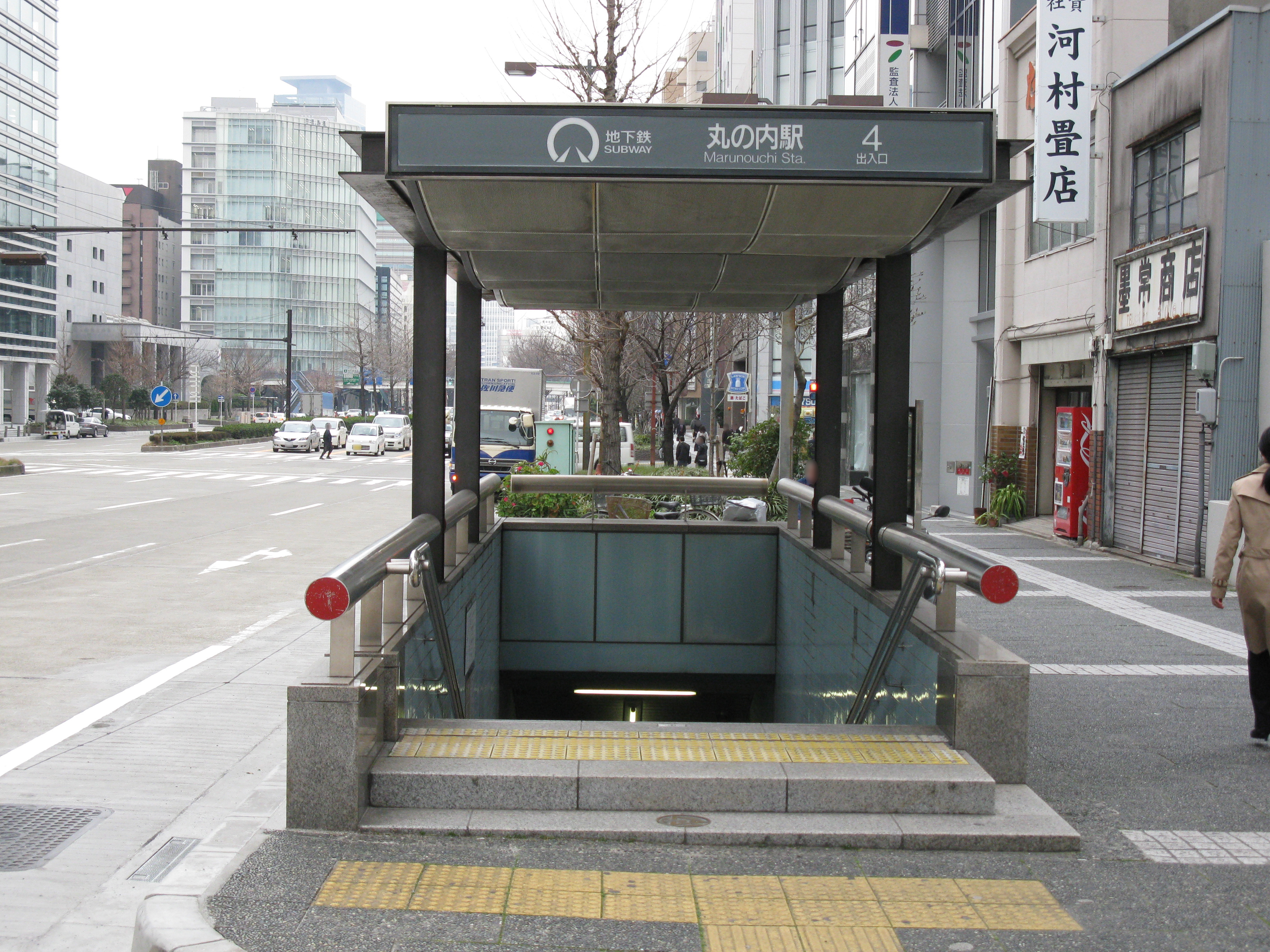
- Marunouchi Station, 4th Entrance

General information
- Location: Marunouchi 2-16-1, Naka, Nagoya, Aichi （名古屋市中区丸の内二丁目16-1） Japan
- System: Nagoya Municipal Subway station
- Operator: Transportation Bureau City of Nagoya
- Lines: Sakura-dōri Line; Tsurumai Line

Other information
- Station code: T06; S04

History
- Opened: 27 November 1981; 44 years ago

Passengers
- 2000: 14,792 daily

Services
Preceding station	Nagoya Municipal Subway	Following station
Kokusai Center S03 towards Taiko-dori	Sakura-dōri Line	Hisaya-ōdōri S05 towards Tokushige
Sengen-chō T05 towards Kami-Otai	Tsurumai Line	Fushimi T07 towards Akaike
Location

Rail tracks map of the station

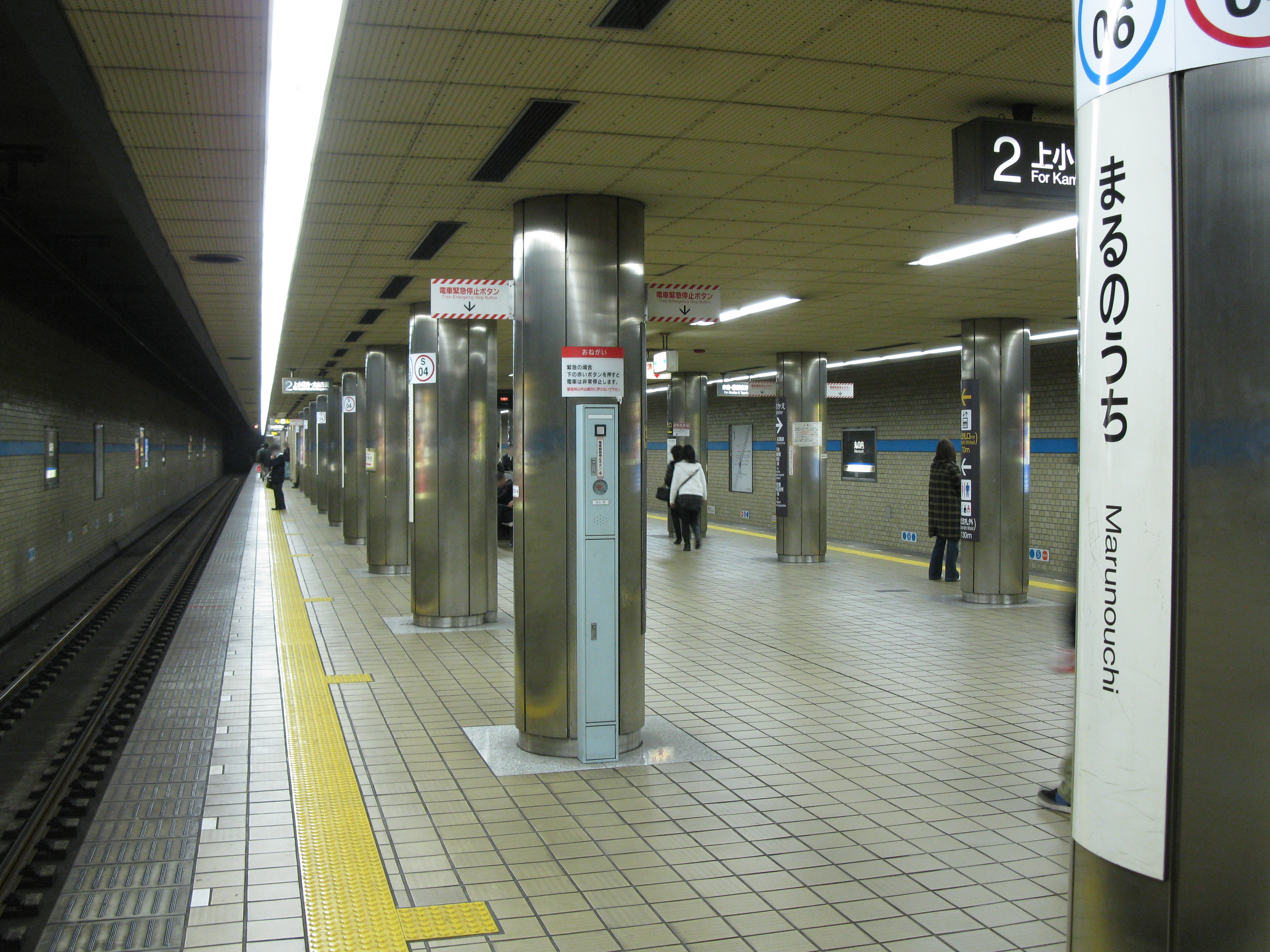
Station platform 1 and 2 of the Tsurumai Line (2010)

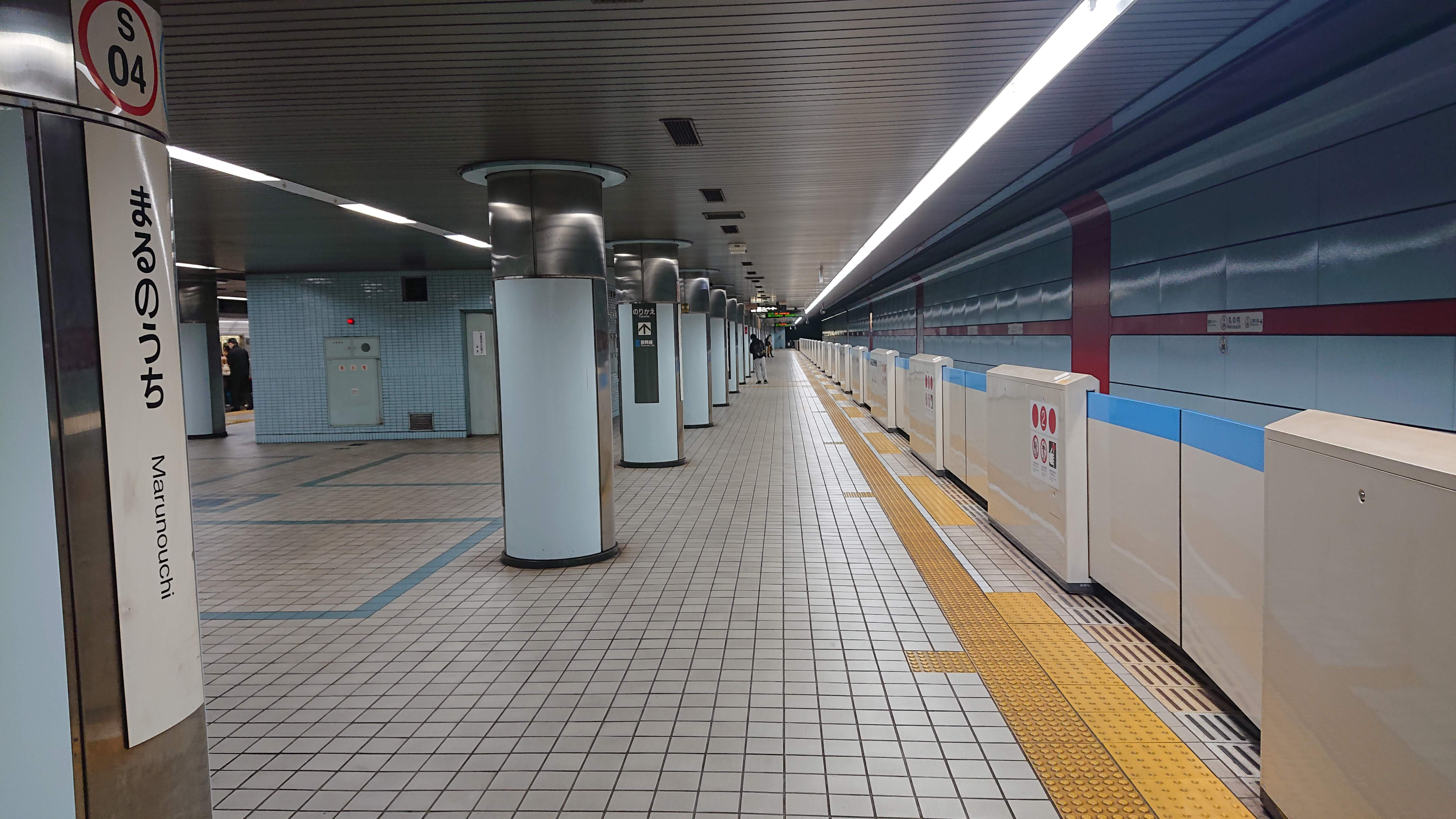
Station platform of the Sakura-dōri Line (2019)

Marunouchi Station (丸の内駅, Marunouchi-eki) is an underground metro station located in Naka-ku, Nagoya, Aichi Prefecture, Japan operated by the Nagoya Municipal Subway. The station is an interchange station between the Tsurumai Line and the Sakura-dōri Line, and is located 6.3 rail kilometers from the terminus of the Tsurumai Line at Kami-Otai Station and 2.4 rail kilometers from the terminus of the Sakuradōri Line at Taiko-dori Station.

This station provides access to Aichi Prefectural Library, the headquarters of Chunichi Shimbun, and the Brazilian consulate in Nagoya. It is the deepest station in the city's subway system, with the Sakura-dōri Line platform located 23.9 meters below ground.

== History ==
Marunouchi Station was opened on 27 November 1981 as a station on the Tsurumai Line. The Sakura-dōri Line connected to the station on 10 September 1989. Platform screen doors were installed on the Sakura-dōri Line platform on 5 March 2011.

== Lines ==
- Nagoya Municipal Subway
  - Tsurumai Line (Station number: T06)
  - Sakura-dōri Line (Station number: S04)

== Layout ==
Marunouchi Station has two underground island platforms. The Sakura-dōri Line platform, at a depth of 24 meters, is the deepest subway platform in Nagoya.

=== Platforms ===
1	■ Tsurumai Line	For Akaike and Toyotashi
2	■ Tsurumai Line	For Kami-Otai and Inuyama
3	■ Sakura-dōri Line	For Imaike and Tokushige
4	■ Sakura-dōri Line	For Nagoya and Taiko-dori

On Platform 1, door 1 is closest to the connecting passage to the Sakuradōri Line platform and door 16 is closest to the elevator, and on Platform 2, door 9 is closest to the elevator and door 24 is closest to the connecting passage. On the platforms for the Sakuradōri Line, on Platform 3 for Akaike door 8 is closest to the elevator and the connecting passage is behind the train, beyond door 20, and on Platform 4 for Nagoya, door 17 is closest to the elevator and door 1 is closest to the connecting passage. There are two wickets, the East Wicket for the Sakuradōri Line portion of the station and the North Wicket for the Tsurumai Line portion.
