= Kokusai Center Station =

Metro station in Nagoya, Japan

Coordinates: 35.1721°N 136.8894°E

S03 Kokusai Center Station 国際センター駅
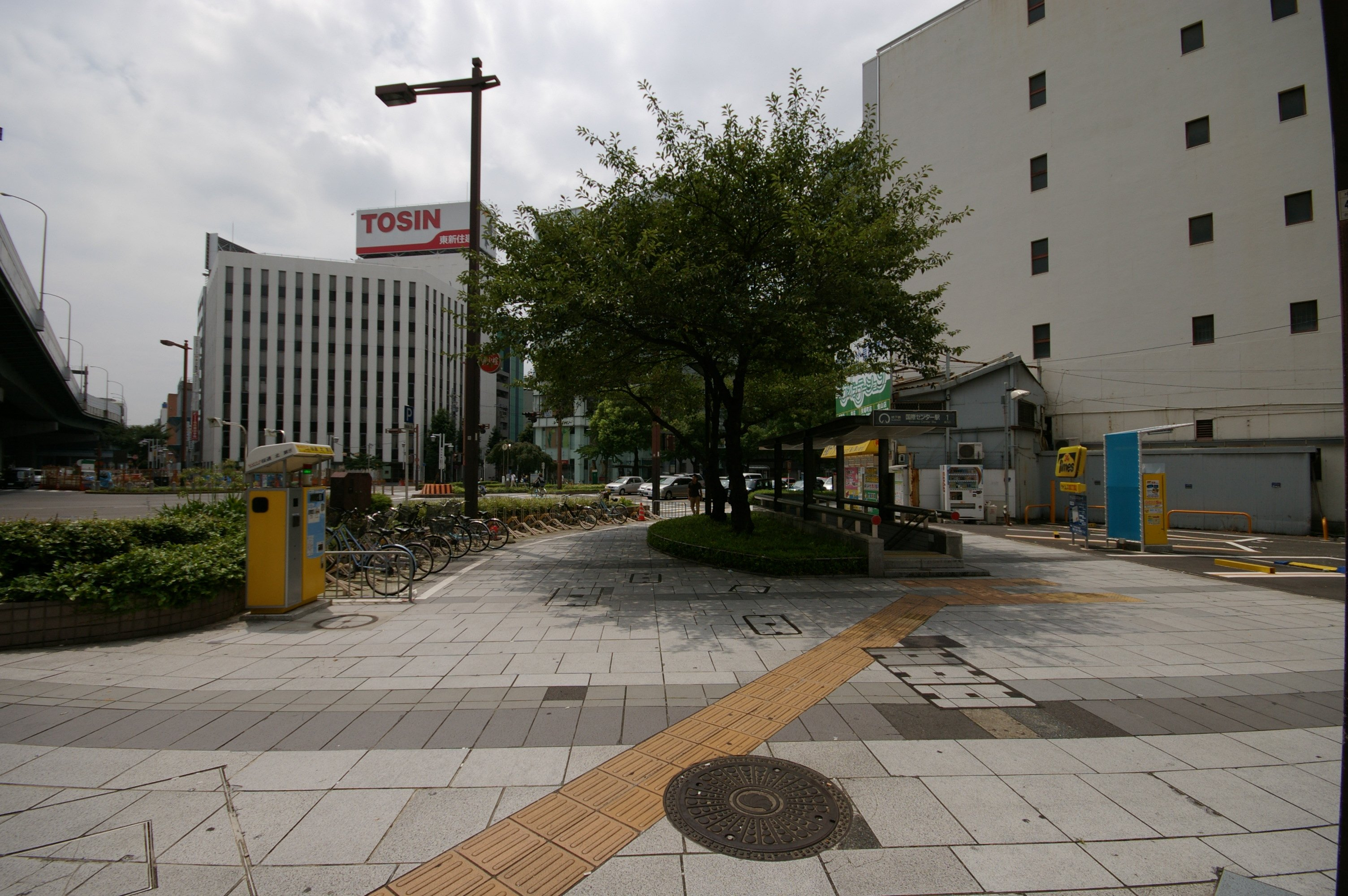

General information
- Location: Meieki 4-13, Nakamura, Nagoya, Aichi （名古屋市中村区名駅四丁目13） Japan
- System: Nagoya Municipal Subway station
- Operator: Transportation Bureau City of Nagoya
- Line: Sakura-dōri Line
- Connections: Bus stop

Other information
- Station code: S03

History
- Opened: 10 September 1989; 37 years ago

Passengers
- FY2007: 4,251 daily

Services
Preceding station	Nagoya Municipal Subway	Following station
Nagoya S02 towards Taiko-dori	Sakura-dōri Line	Marunouchi S04 towards Tokushige
Location

Kokusai Center Station (国際センター駅, Kokusai Sentaa-eki) is a train station in Nakamura-ku, Nagoya, Aichi Prefecture, Japan.

The station is linked to Nagoya International Center, after which the station is named. A long underground passage links this station directly to Nagoya Station; that is, the network of underground shopping malls and passages extends to this station and includes it.

It opened on 10 September 1989.

== Lines ==
- Nagoya Municipal Subway Sakura-dōri Line (Station number: S03)

== Layout ==
=== Platforms ===
1	■ Sakura-dōri Line	For Imaike, Aratama-bashi and Tokushige
2	■ Sakura-dōri Line	For Nagoya and Taiko-dori
