= Yagoto Nisseki Station =

Metro station in Nagoya, Japan

Coordinates: 35.1447°N 136.9649°E

M19 Yagoto Nisseki Station 八事日赤駅
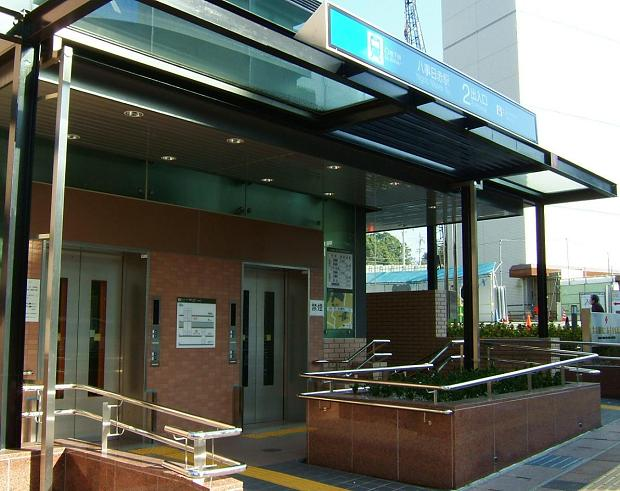

General information
- Location: Yamanotedōri 3-17, Shōwa, Nagoya, Aichi （名古屋市昭和区山手通三丁目17） Japan
- System: Nagoya Municipal Subway station
- Operator: Transportation Bureau City of Nagoya
- Line: Meijō Line
- Connections: Bus stop

Other information
- Station code: M19

History
- Opened: 6 October 2004; 21 years ago

Passengers
- 2008: 5,526 daily

Services
Preceding station	Nagoya Municipal Subway	Following station
Nagoya Daigaku M18 anticlockwise	Meijō Line	Yagoto M20 clockwise
Location

Yagoto Nisseki Station (八事日赤駅, Yagoto Nisseki-eki) is an underground metro station located in Shōwa-ku, Nagoya, Aichi Prefecture, Japan operated by the Nagoya Municipal Subway. It is located 16.2 rail kilometers from the terminus of the Meijō Line at Kanayama Station. This station serves Nagoya Daini Red Cross Hospital.

== History ==
Yagoto Nisseki Station was opened on 6 October 2004 and serves the area of Yagoto.

== Lines ==
- Nagoya Municipal Subway
  - Meijō Line (Station number: M19)

== Layout ==
Yagoto Nisseki Station has two underground opposed side platforms.

=== Platforms ===
1	■ Meijō Line	For Motoyama and Ōzone
2	■ Meijō Line	For Yagoto and Aratama-bashi
