= George Kuwayama =

American art curator (1925–2022)

- Born: February 25, 1925; New York City, New York, U.S.
- Died: December 7, 2022 (aged 97); Los Angeles, California, U.S.
- Occupations: Museum curator, author
- Writing career
- Genre: Asian art
- Subject: Ceramics

George Kuwayama (February 25, 1925 – December 7, 2022) was an American art curator who spent most of his career at the Los Angeles County Museum of Art.

== Early life ==
Kuwayama was born on February 25, 1925, in New York City, where he was also raised. After earned his undergraduate degree at Williams College, he earned graduate degrees from New York University Institute of Fine Arts and University of Michigan.

== Professional life ==
After completing his graduate degrees, Kuwayama worked at the Freer Gallery of Art in Washington, D.C., and then at the National Palace Museum in Taiwan. While in Taiwan, Kuwayama was recruited for employment at the L.A. Museum of History, Science and Art in and joined them at their Exposition Park facility in 1959. Sources differ slightly in their descriptions of the position Kuwayama held when joining the museum in 1959. One source states that he was in charge of all non-Western art. Another states he was the new curator of Oriental Art, and another records that he was the curator of Asian art. In 1965, the museum was reorganized which resulted in the establishing of the Los Angeles County Museum of Art on Wilshire Boulevard which Kuwayama transferred to. He retired in 1996 and was later awarded the first Senior Conservator Emeritus from the Los Angeles County Museum.

Kuwayama had a reputation of exceptional judgment for tangible, three dimensional objects, and a preferential, personal affinity for the simple artistic expressions of early Japanese wares. This was an important influence on the Los Angeles County Museum's collection. At the end of Kuwayama's tenure, the museum had collected a significant amount of Tang and Song dynasty pieces as their elegant shapes and glazed in monochromatic tones reflected his tastes. This resulted in a collection that reflects far fewer Ming and Qing pieces, pieces with elaborate designs from a later period, than the older Tang and Song pieces.

== Post-professional life ==
After he retired, Kuwayama continued his involvement with Asian ceramics. Kuwayama knew amateurs who had acquired Ming porcelains which were from a suspected Manila galleon wreck in Baja California. At his own home, Kuwayama brought them together with archaeologist Edward Von der Porten to facilitate a professional level inquiry into the site. Acting on their information, Von der Porten studied the site for years and later identified the shipwreck as the San Juanillo.

Kuwayama was also involved in the controversy regarding ceramic pieces donated to California State University, Northridge by Roland Tseng. In 2004, this collection of objects was the highest valued donation ever made to a California State University. Kuwayama wrote to Jolene Koester, CSUN president, in which he disputed the authenticity of the donated objects and offered to examine the collection. Koester declined his offer.

George Kuwayama died in Los Angeles on December 7, 2022, at the age of 97.

== Selected bibliography of Kuwayama’s works ==
- Chinese Ceramics: The Heeramaneck Collection. Los Angeles County Museum, 1973. ISBN 9780875870571
- Far Eastern Lacquer. Princeton University Press, 1982. ISBN 0875871089
- Quest For Eternity. Chronicle Books, 1987. ISBN 9780877014287
- Shippo: The Art of Enameling in Japan. Los Angeles County Museum, 1987. ISBN 9780875871363
- Chinese Ceramics In Colonial America. University of Hawaii Press, 1997. ISBN 0875871798
