= Tōgan-ji =

Coordinates: 35.1613°N 136.965°E

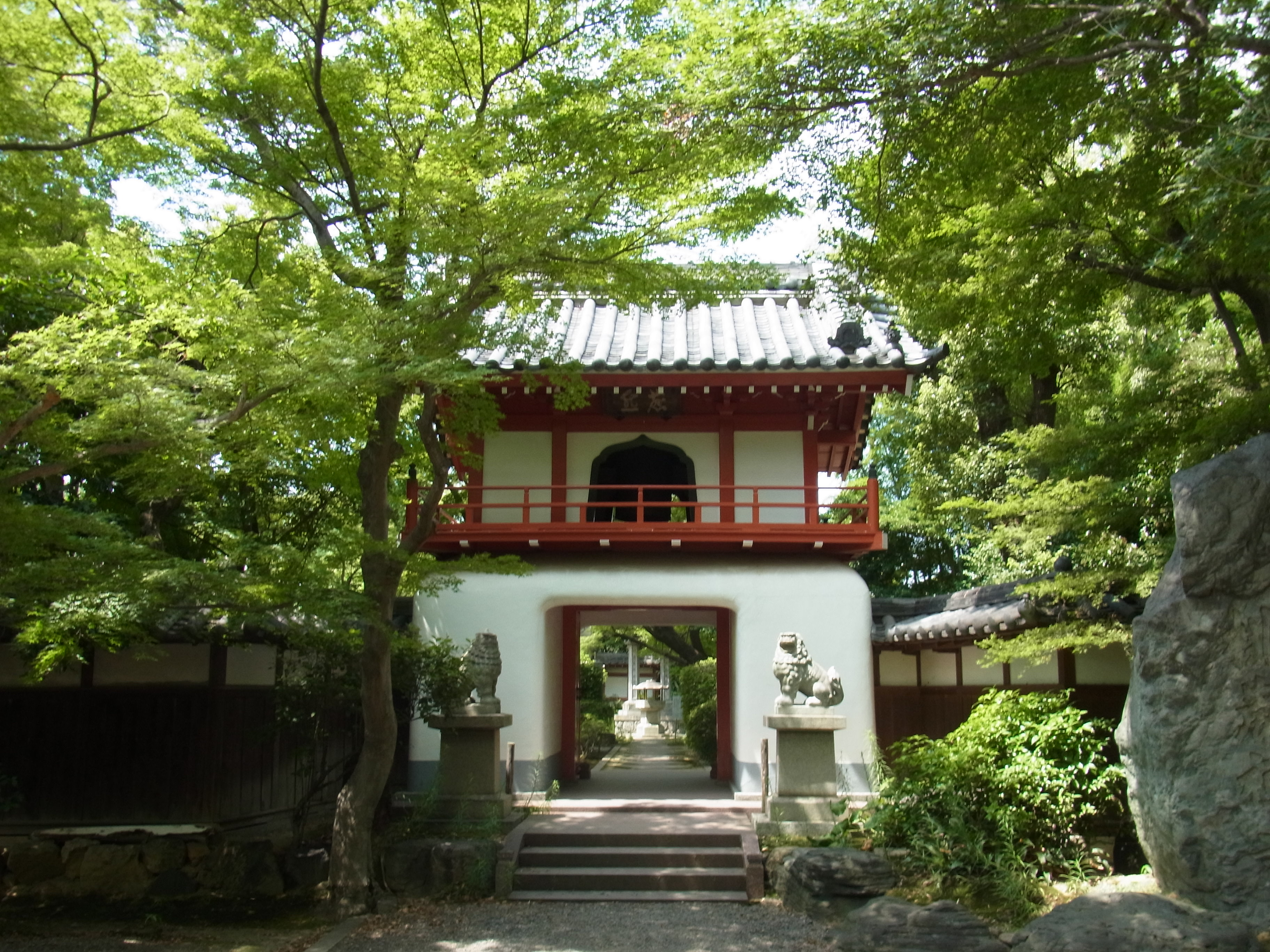
Tōgan-ji belfry gate (2013)

The Great Buddha of Nagoya statue in Tōgan-ji

Tōgan-ji (桃巌寺) is a Buddhist temple of the Sōtō Zen sect located in Nagoya, central Japan. In 16th Century Toganji Temple has a Shiva-Lingam from 16th century.

== History ==
Originally built in 1502 by Oda Nobuyuki in memory of his father, Oda Nobuhide, it was moved to its current location in 1714. The temple grounds have a turtle pond and a grove of giant bamboo. A 10-meter tall Buddha statue known as "The Great Buddha of Nagoya" was erected in 1987.

The closest subway is Motoyama Station on the Higashiyama Subway Line and Nagoya University.
