= Fukiage Station (Nagoya) =

Subway station in Nagaya, Japan

Coordinates: 35.1589°N 136.935°E

S09 Fukiage Station 吹上駅
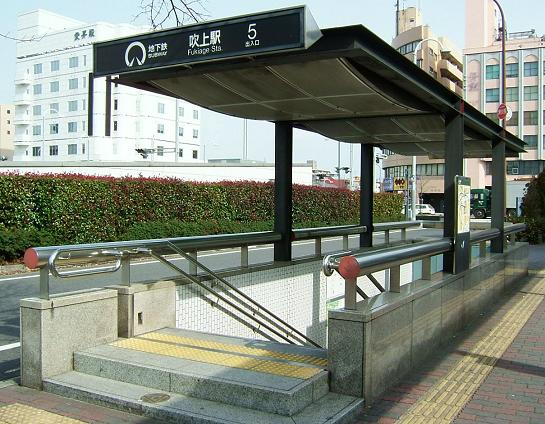
- Entrance 5 of the station (February 2005)

General information
- Location: Chikusatōri 7-24-2, Chikusa, Nagoya, Aichi （名古屋市千種区千種通七丁目24-2） Japan
- System: Nagoya Municipal Subway station
- Operator: Transportation Bureau City of Nagoya
- Line: Sakura-dōri Line
- Connections: Bus stop

Other information
- Station code: S09

History
- Opened: 30 March 1994; 32 years ago

Passengers
- 2022: 13,028 daily

Services
Preceding station	Nagoya Municipal Subway	Following station
Imaike S08 towards Taiko-dori	Sakura-dōri Line	Gokiso S10 towards Tokushige
Location

Fukiage Station (吹上駅, Fukiage-eki) is a train station in Chikusa-ku, Nagoya, Aichi Prefecture, Japan

It was opened on 30 March 1994; 32 years ago.

== Lines ==
- Nagoya Municipal Subway
  - Sakura-dōri Line (Station number: S09)

== Layout ==
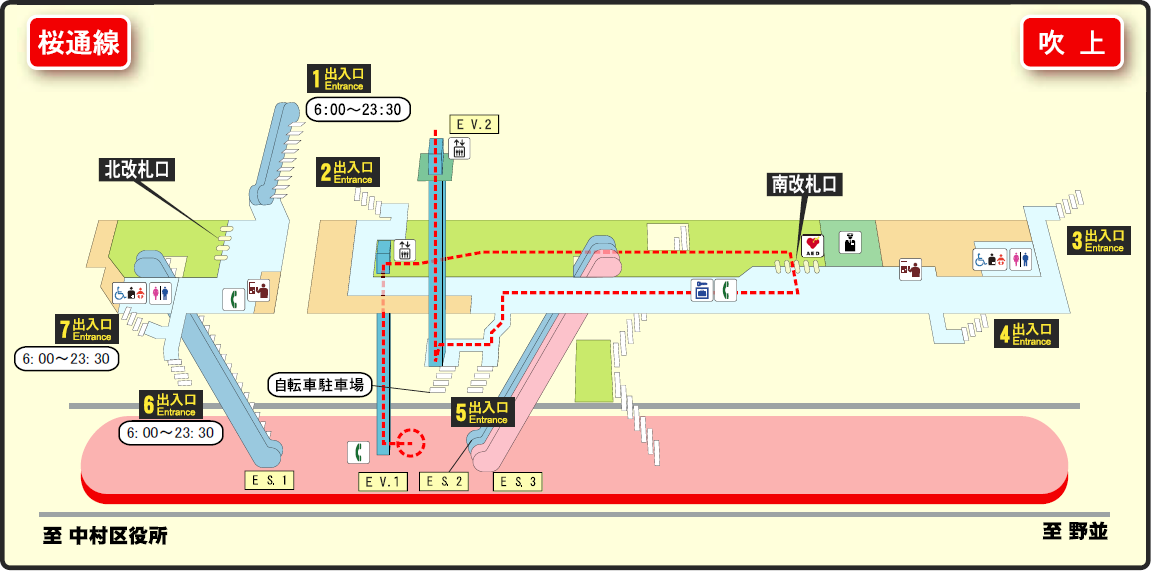
Layout of the station

The station has a single island platform with two tracks on the side. The concourse is split in two.

=== Platforms ===
1	■ Sakura-dōri Line	For Aratama-bashi and Tokushige
2	■ Sakura-dōri Line	For Imaike, Nagoya, and Taiko-dori

== See also ==
- Nagoya Institute of Technology
