= Shōwa-ku =

Ward of Nagoya in Chūbu, Japan

Shōwa 昭和区
- Ward
- Shōwa Ward
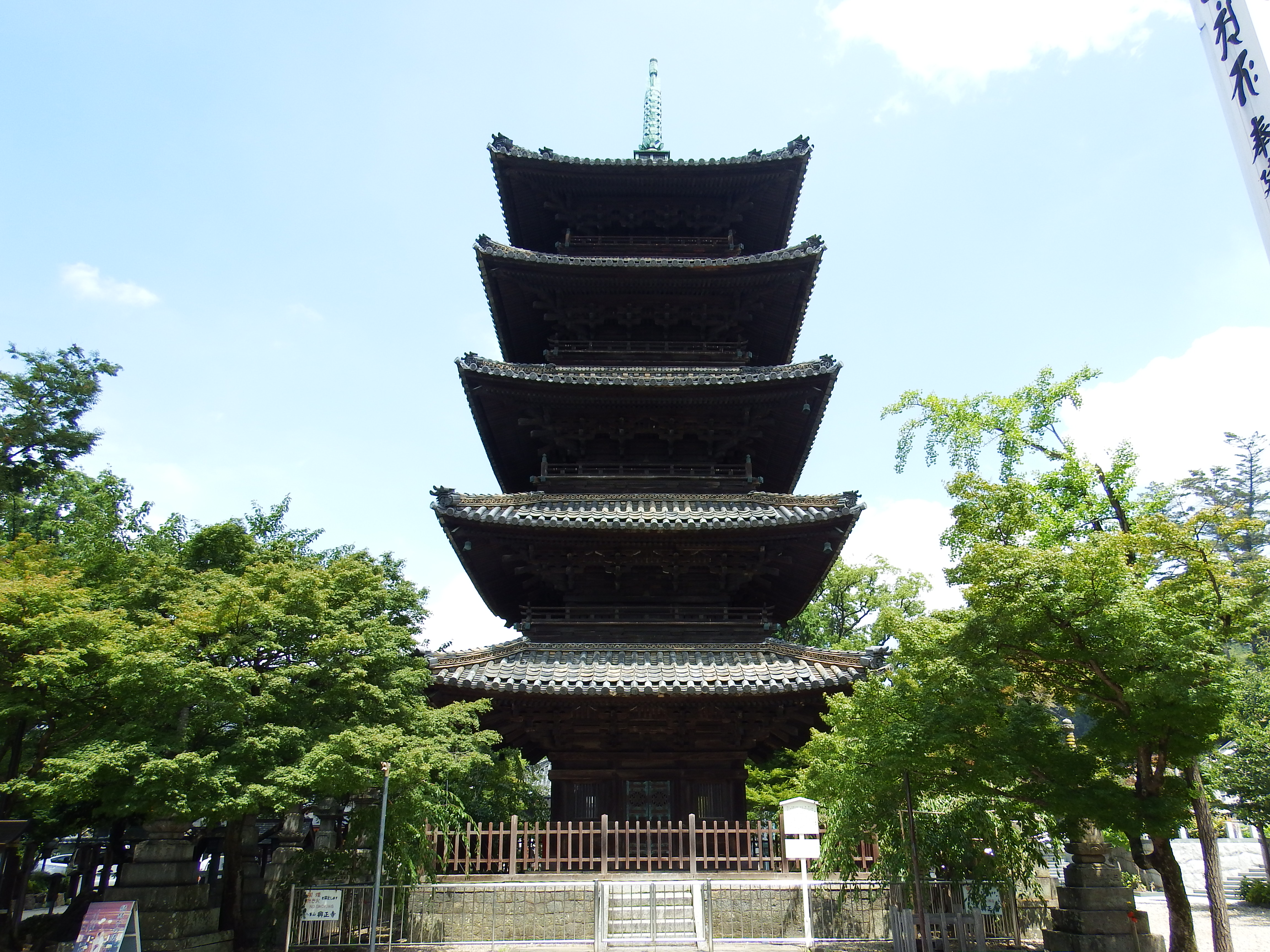
- Kōshō-ji

- Flag

- Location of Shōwa-ku in Nagoya

- Coordinates: 35°09′01″N 136°56′03″E
- Country: Japan
- Region: Tōkai region Chūbu region
- Prefecture: Aichi

Area
  - Total: 10.94 km^{2} (4.22 sq mi)

Population (October 1, 2019)
  - Total: 110,436
  - Density: 10,090/km^{2} (26,150/sq mi)
- Time zone: UTC+9 (Japan Standard Time)
- Tree: Flowering Dogwood
- Flower: Japanese iris
- Phone number: 052-731-1511
- Address: 3-19, Yuwa-dori, Showa-ku, Nagoya-shi, Aichi-ken 466-8585
- Website: www.city.nagoya.jp/showa/ (in Japanese)

Shōwa-ku (昭和区, Shōwa-ku) is one of the 16 wards of the city of Nagoya in Aichi Prefecture, Japan. As of 1 October 2019, the ward had an estimated population of 110,436 and a population density of 10,095 persons per km². The total area was 10.94 km².

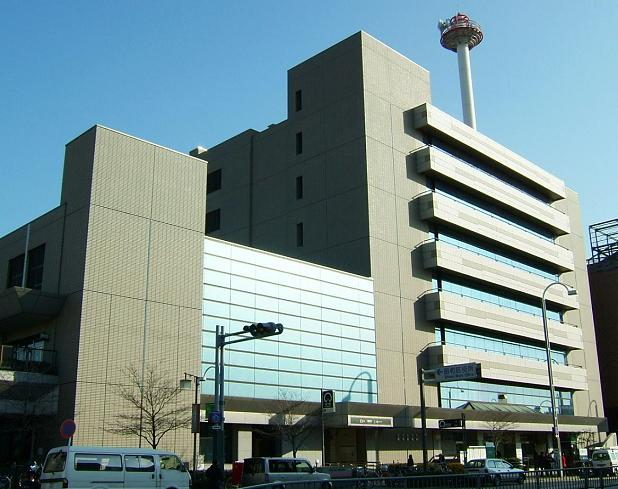
Shōwa-ku Ward Office

== Geography ==
Shōwa Ward is located near the geographic center of Nagoya.

=== Surrounding municipalities ===
- Mizuho Ward
- Atsuta Ward
- Naka Ward
- Tenpaku Ward
- Chikusa Ward

== History ==
Kawanayama-chō is a historic, formerly separate area. Kawana ware was produced at the Kōjaku-in (香積院) during the Edo period.

Gokiso Village in Aichi District was annexed by Nagoya on August 22, 1921, becoming part of Naka District. Shōwa District was established on October 1, 1937 out of a portion of former Naka District and Minami District. On Feb 11, 1944, a portion of Shōwa District joined with a portion of Atsuta District to form Mizuho District. On April 5, 1955 the district annexed neighboring Tempaku village, which became the separate Tempaku District on February 1, 1977.

Parts of Yagoto are located in the Shōwa ward.

== Education ==
- Chukyo University
- Nagoya University – Medical School
- Nagoya Institute of Technology
- Nanzan University
- St. Mary's College, Nagoya
- Kuwayama Art Museum
- Mandolin Melodies Museum
- Showa Museum of Art
- Tsuruma Central Library

== Transportation ==
=== Railroads ===
- Nagoya Municipal Subway – Tsurumai Line
  - Arahata - Gokiso - Kawana - Irinaka - Yagoto
- Nagoya Municipal Subway – Sakura-dōri Line
  - Gokiso
- Nagoya Municipal Subway – Meijō Line
  - Yagoto Nisseki- Yagoto

=== Highways ===
- Ring Route (Nagoya Expressway)
- Route 3 (Nagoya Expressway)

== Local attractions ==
- Tsuruma Park
- Kōshō-ji
- Nagoya Civic Assembly Hall

== Noted people from Shōwa Ward ==
- Sakuma Morimasa – samurai
- Karina Nose – actress, model
