= Motoyama Station (Nagoya) =

Metro station in Nagoya, Japan

Coordinates: 35.1639°N 136.964°E

M17 H16 Motoyama Station 本山駅
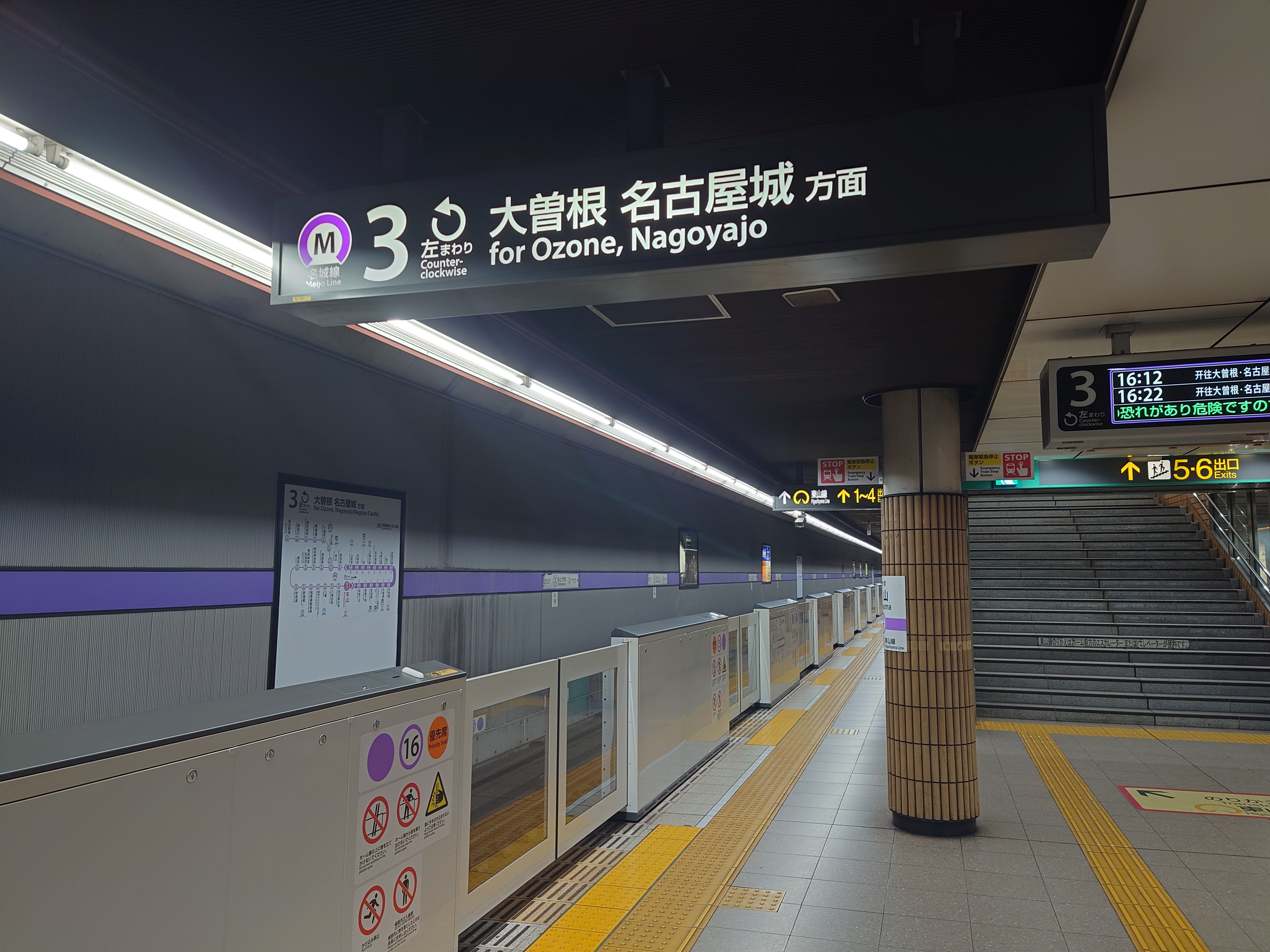
- Meijō Line platform, 1 April 2023

General information
- Location: Yotsuyadōri 1-18-1, Chikusa, Nagoya, Aichi （名古屋市千種区四谷通一丁目18-1） Japan
- System: Nagoya Municipal Subway station
- Operator: Transportation Bureau City of Nagoya
- Lines: Meijō Line; Higashiyama Line
- Connections: Bus terminal

Other information
- Station code: H16; M17

History
- Opened: 1 April 1963

Passengers
- 2008: 14,034 daily

Services
Preceding station	Nagoya Municipal Subway	Following station
Jiyūgaoka M16 anticlockwise	Meijō Line	Nagoya Daigaku M18 clockwise
Kakuōzan H15 towards Takabata	Higashiyama Line	Higashiyama Kōen H17 towards Fujigaoka
Location

Motoyama Station (本山駅, Motoyama-eki) is a railway station in Chikusa-ku, Nagoya, Aichi Prefecture, Japan

It was opened on 1 April 1963.

The station provides access to Tōgan-ji which includes the Nagoya Daibutsu, Nagoya's large statue of Buddha. The area near this station also includes the Nagoya-area weather station.

== Lines ==
- Nagoya Municipal Subway
  - Higashiyama Line (Station number: H16)
  - Meijō Line (Station number: M17)

== Layout ==
=== Platforms ===
1	■ Higashiyama Line	For Higashiyama Kōen and Fujigaoka
2	■ Higashiyama Line	For Sakae, Nagoya, and Takabata
3	■ Meijō Line	For Nagoyajo and Ōzone
4	■ Meijō Line	For Yagoto and Aratama-bashi
