= Yagoto Station =

Metro station in Nagoya, Japan

Coordinates: 35.1367°N 136.9640°E

M20 T15 Yagoto Station 八事駅
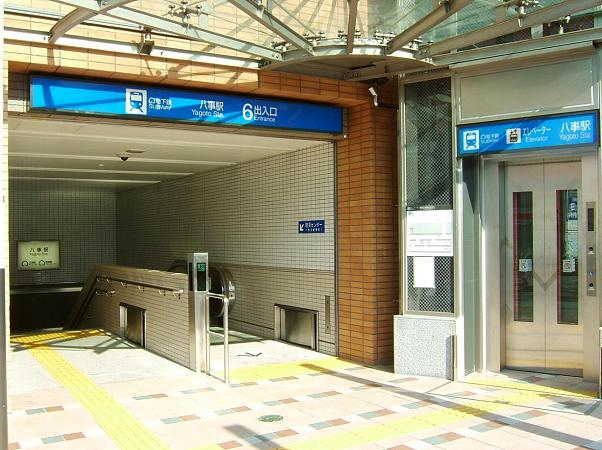
- Yagoto Station No. 6 entrance

General information
- Location: 102 Hiroji Kitaishizaka, Shōwa, Nagoya, Aichi （名古屋市昭和区広路町字北石坂102） Japan
- System: Nagoya Municipal Subway station
- Operator: Transportation Bureau City of Nagoya
- Lines: Meijō Line; Tsurumai Line
- Connections: Bus terminal

Other information
- Station code: T15, M20

History
- Opened: 18 March 1977; 49 years ago

Passengers
- FY2008: 15,840 daily

Services
Preceding station	Nagoya Municipal Subway	Following station
Yagoto Nisseki M19 anticlockwise	Meijō Line	Sōgō Rihabiri Center M21 clockwise
Irinaka T14 towards Kami-Otai	Tsurumai Line	Shiogama-guchi T16 towards Akaike
Location

Yagoto Station (八事駅, Yagoto-eki) is an underground metro station on the Nagoya Municipal Subway in Shōwa-ku, Nagoya, Aichi Prefecture, Japan, operated by the Transportation Bureau City of Nagoya. The station is located in part of the district of Yagoto.

== Lines ==
Yagoto Station is served by the following Nagoya Municipal Subway lines:

- Tsurumai Line (Station number: T15)
- Meijō Line (Station number: M20)

It is an interchange station between the Tsurumai Line and the Meijō Line, and is located 15.0 kilometers from the terminus of the Tsurumai Line at Kami-Otai Station, and 17.2 kilometers from the terminus of the Meijō Line at Kanayama Station.

== Layout ==
Yagoto Station has one underground island platform for use by the Tsurumai Line and two underground opposed side platforms for use by the Meijō Line.

=== Platforms ===
1	■ Tsurumai Line	for Akaike and Toyotashi
2	■ Tsurumai Line	for Fushimi, Kami-Otai, and Inuyama
3	■ Meijō Line	for Motoyama and Ōzone
4	■ Meijō Line	for Aratama-bashi, Kanayama, and Nagoyakō

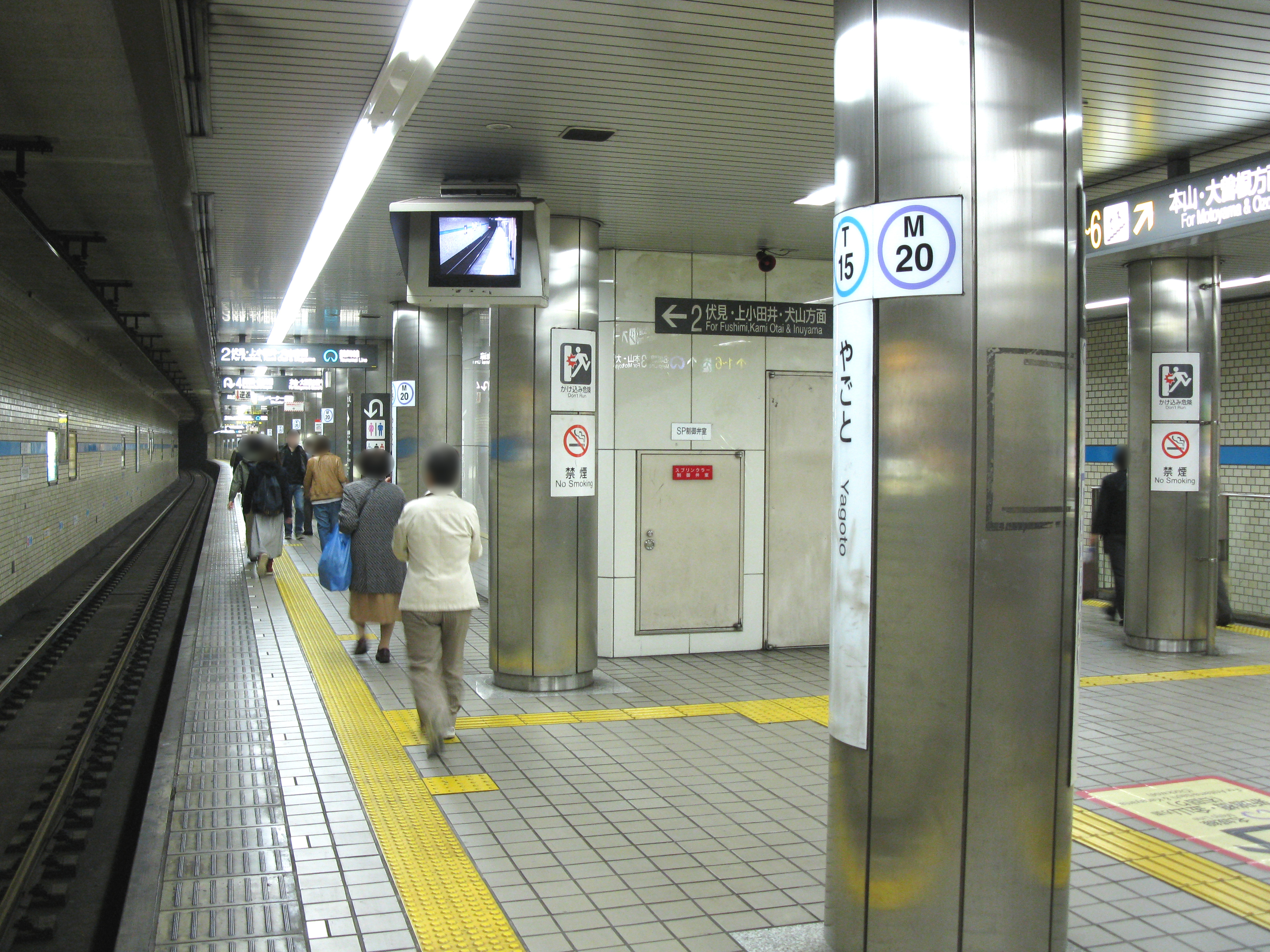
Platform 2 of the Tsurumai Line in 2010

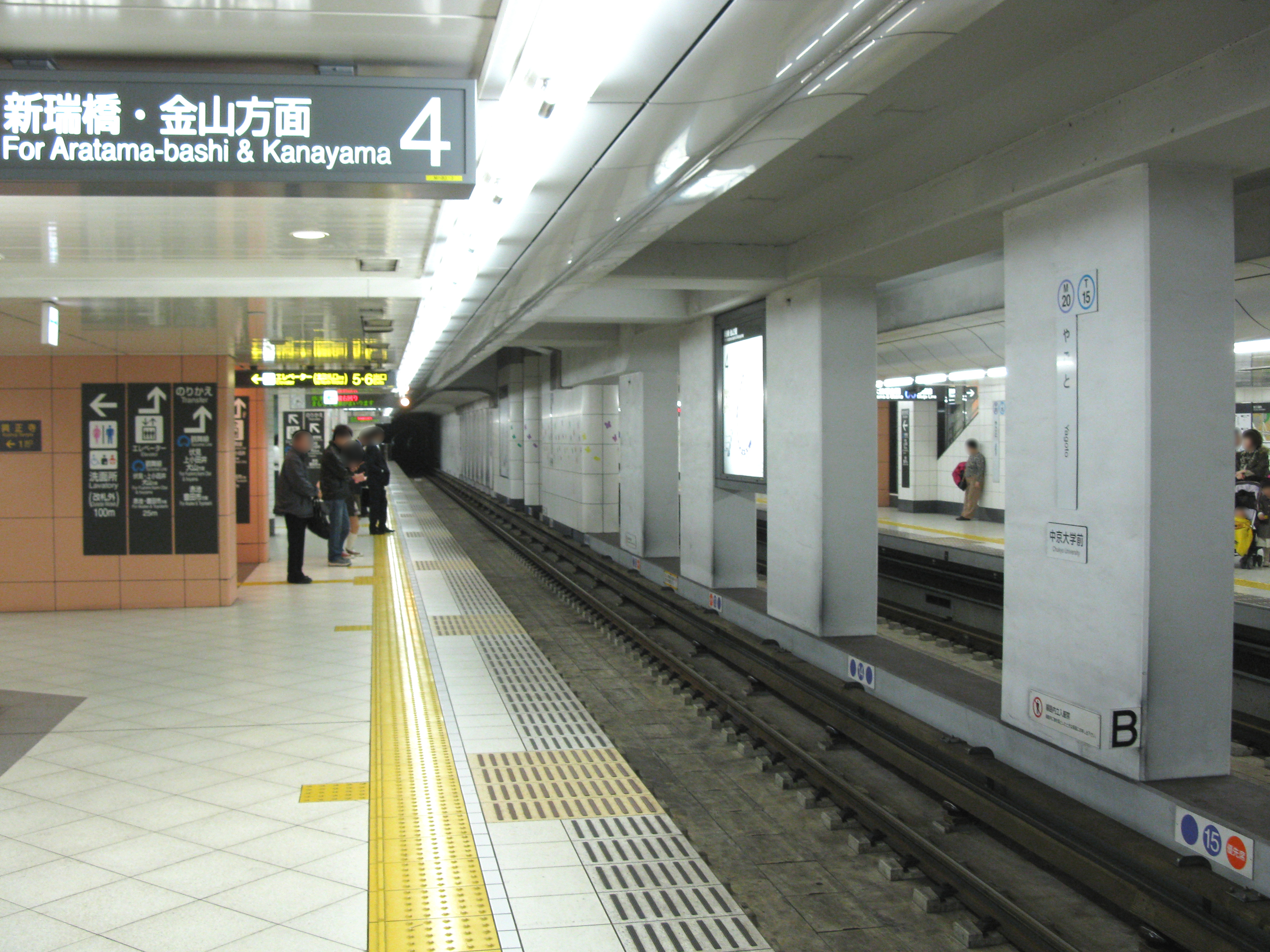
Platform 4 of the Meijō Line towards Aratama-bashi and Kanayama in 210

== History ==
Yagoto Station was opened on 18 March 1977 as the initial terminal station for the Tsurumai Line. The Tsurumai Line was extended to Akaike Station on 1 October 1978. The Meijō Line connected to this station from 6 October 2004.

== Notable Locations ==
Locations nearby include the Shingon Buddhist temple of Kōshō-ji, the Nagoya campus of Chukyo University, and the Yagoto branch of AEON Mall.
