= Minato Kuyakusho Station =

Metro station in Nagoya, Japan

Coordinates: 35.1056°N 136.8845°E

E05 Minato Kuyakusho Station 港区役所駅
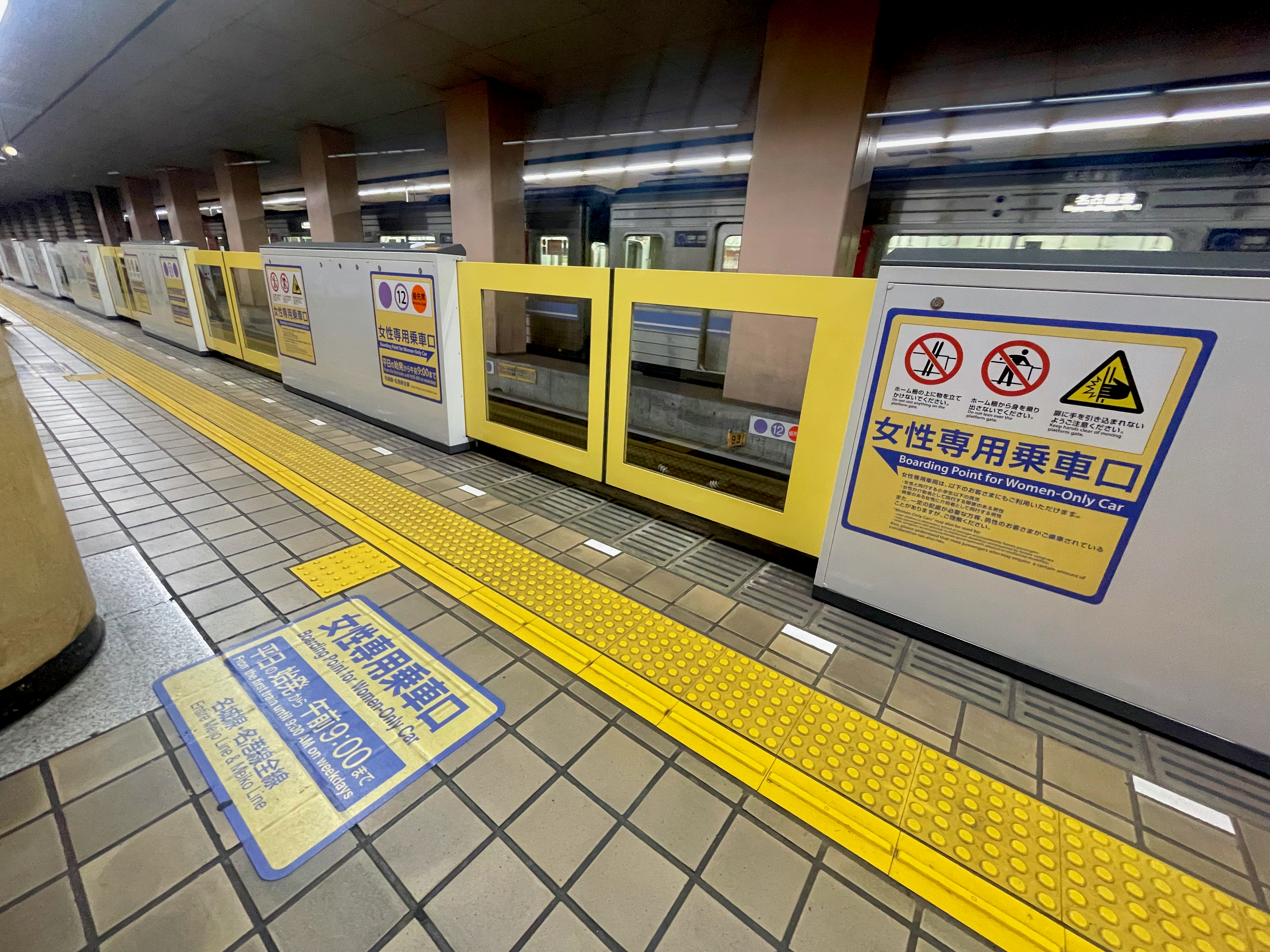
- Platforms

General information
- Location: 1-14-20 Kōraku, Minato, Nagoya, Aichi （名古屋市港区港楽一丁目14-20） Japan
- System: Nagoya Municipal Subway station
- Operator: Transportation Bureau City of Nagoya
- Line: Meikō Line
- Connections: Bus stop

Other information
- Station code: E5

History
- Opened: 29 March 1971; 55 years ago

Passengers
- FY2008: 1,235,690

Services
Preceding station	Nagoya Municipal Subway	Following station
Tsukiji-guchi E06 towards Nagoyakō	Meikō Line	Tōkai-dōri E04 towards Kanayama
Location

Minato Kuyakusho Station (港区役所駅, Minato Kuyakusho-eki) is an underground railway station on the Meikō Line in Minato-ku, Nagoya, Aichi Prefecture, Japan, operated by Nagoya Municipal Subway. It is numbered "E05".

== Lines ==
Minato Kuyakusho Station is served by the Meikō Line, and lies 4.6 km from the terminus of the Meikō Line at Kanayama Station.

== Layout ==
Minato Kuyakusho Station has two underground opposed side platforms. There is one set of ticket barriers, beyond which there are two exits. Each platform has an elevator, and Platform 1 for Nagoyakō Station has an up escalator and Platform 2 for Kanayama Station has a down escalator. Beyond the gates are two exits, Exit 1 and Exit 2. Near Exit 2 is a public telephone. There are universal access toilets with a baby changing area.

=== Platforms ===
1	■ Meikō Line	for Nagoyakō
2	■ Meikō Line	for Kanayama, Sakae, and Ōzone

On Platform 1 for Nagoyakō Station, train door 13 is closest to the elevator, door 12 is closest to the escalator, and doors 5 and 12 are closest to the stairs. On the opposite platform, Platform 2 for Kanayama Station, train door 14 is closest to the elevator and doors 7 and 14 are closest to the stairs.

== History ==
Minato Kuyakusho Station was opened on 29 March 1971.

== Surrounding area ==
This station provides access to its namesake, Minato-ku Ward Office, as well as a local library and a 24-hour post office.
