= Shiga-hondōri Station =

Metro station in Nagoya, Japan

Coordinates: 35.1963°N 136.9212°E

M10 Shiga-hondōri Station 志賀本通駅
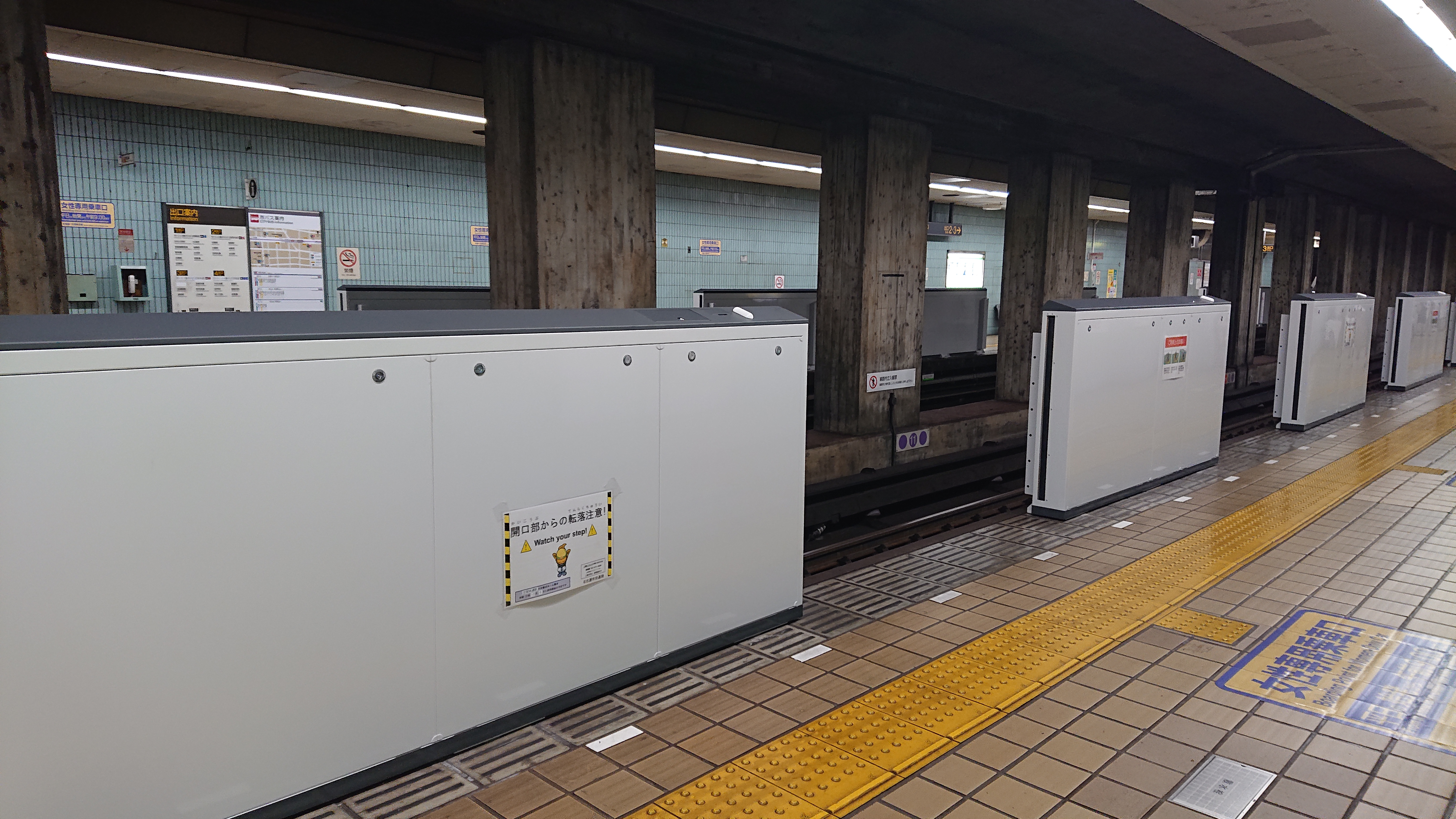

General information
- Location: Shiga-hondōri 2-47, Kita, Nagoya, Aichi （名古屋市北区志賀本通二丁目47） Japan
- System: Nagoya Municipal Subway station
- Operator: Transportation Bureau City of Nagoya
- Line: Meijō Line
- Connections: Bus terminal

Other information
- Station code: M10

History
- Opened: 20 December 1971; 54 years ago

Passengers
- 2007: 6,100 daily

Services
Preceding station	Nagoya Municipal Subway	Following station
Kurokawa M09 anticlockwise	Meijō Line	Heian-dōri M11 clockwise
Location

Shiga-hondōri Station (志賀本通駅, Shiga-hondōri-eki) is a railway station in Kita-ku, Nagoya, Aichi Prefecture, Japan.

It was opened on 20 December 1971; 54 years ago.

== Lines ==
- Nagoya Municipal Subway
  - Meijō Line (Station number: M10)

== Layout ==
=== Platforms ===
1	■ Meijō Line	For Sakae, Kanayama, Aratama-bashi, and Nagoyakō
2	■ Meijō Line	For Ōzone and Motoyama

=== Platform Map ===
The following is a map of the platform and the car placement.

Platform of Shigahondori Station

=== Internal Station Map ===
(map to come)
Blue denotes upward moving escalators.
Pink denotes downward moving escalators.

=== External Exit Placement ===
(map to come)

== Disabled or Injured Route Information ==
From either platform, there are elevators to the east wicket (exit 1 & 4). From the east wicket, there is an elevator to ground level off exit 1.
Both escalators from the platform for Ozone are upward moving. Both escalators from the platform for Sakae are upward moving.
All exits are stairwells.
