= Rokuban-chō Station =

Metro station in Nagoya, Japan

Coordinates: 35.1247°N 136.8890°E

E03 Rokuban-chō Station 六番町駅
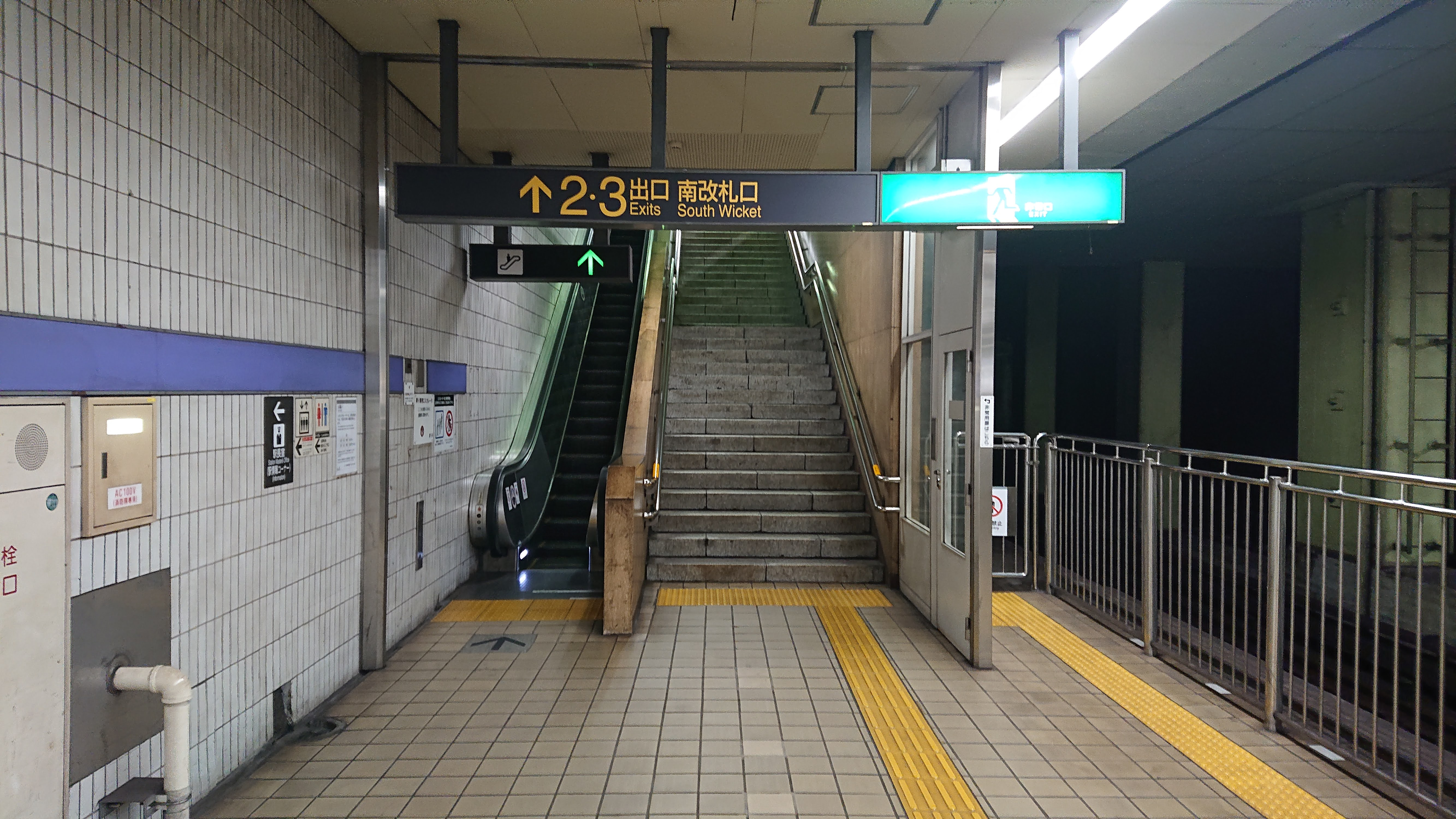
- Platforms

General information
- Location: Yonban 1-10-12, Atsuta, Nagoya, Aichi （名古屋市熱田区四番一丁目10-12） Japan
- System: Nagoya Municipal Subway station
- Operator: Transportation Bureau City of Nagoya
- Line: Meikō Line
- Connections: Bus terminal

Other information
- Station code: E3

History
- Opened: 29 March 1971; 55 years ago

Passengers
- 2008: 2,424,660

Services
Preceding station	Nagoya Municipal Subway	Following station
Tōkai-dōri E04 towards Nagoyakō	Meikō Line	Hibino E02 towards Kanayama
Location

Rokuban-chō Station (六番町駅, Rokuban-chō-eki) is an underground metro station located in Atsuta-ku, Nagoya, Aichi Prefecture, Japan operated by the Nagoya Municipal Subway's Meikō Line. It is located 2.6 kilometers from the terminus of the Meikō Line at Kanayama Station.

== History ==
Rokuban-chō Station opened on 29 March 1971.

== Lines ==
- Nagoya Municipal Subway
  - Meikō Line (Station E03)

== Layout ==
Rokuban-chō Station

=== Platforms ===
1	■ Meikō Line	For Nagoyakō
2	■ Meikō Line	For Kanayama, Sakae, and Ōzone

There are two wickets, the North Wicket, beyond which are Exit 1 and Exit 4, and the South Wicket, beyond which are Exit 2 and Exit 3. On Platform 1, train door 18 is closest to the elevator, door 1 is closest to the escalator, and doors 1 and 18 are closest to the stairs. On Platform 2, door 1 is closest to the elevator and doors 1 and 18 are closest to the stairs. There are public phones near the elevators on the platforms, near the wicket, and near Exit 4. There is a handicapped-accessible bathroom with a baby changing outside the North Wicket. Near Exit 4, there is a rest area. Exit 1 has another elevator to the ground, and Exit 1 leads to a city bus terminal.
