= Nagoya Gakuin University =

Private university in Japan

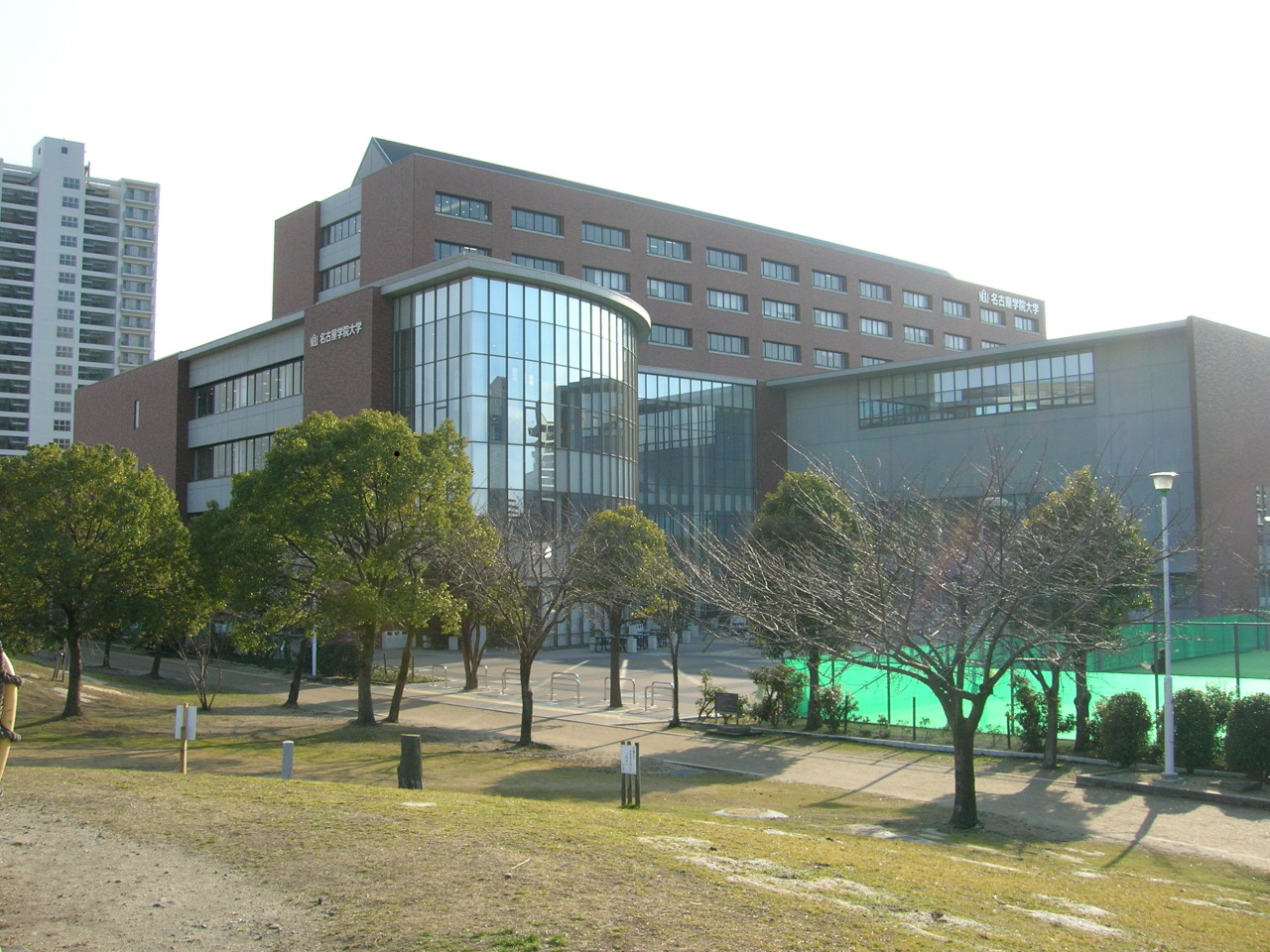
- Former names: Aichi English School Nagoya College
- Type: Private
- Established: 1964
- President: Hiroshi Kojima
- Academic staff: 292
- Undergraduates: 4,556
- Postgraduates: 187
- Location: Nagoya, Japan
- Campus: Hibino Seto
- Nickname: NGU
- Website: www.ngu.jp

Nagoya Gakuin University (名古屋学院大学, Nagoya Gakuin Daigaku) is a private university located in Nagoya, Japan (名古屋市). Founded in 1887 by Dr. Frederick C. Klein, an American Methodist minister, as Aichi English School; the present-day university was established in 1964 with the Faculty of Economics. Nagoya Gakuin University follows the spirit of the school's motto “Fear God, Love People.”.

With a curriculum focusing on Business and Economics, as well as Foreign Studies and Human Health, Nagoya Gakuin University awards degrees at the bachelor's, master's, and Doctor of Philosophy levels.

Additionally, NGU has exchange agreements with universities around the world in 8 different countries: Australia, New Zealand, The Philippines, China, Taiwan, Thailand, The United States of America, Indonesia and Canada. Approximately 30 exchange students come to Nagoya Gakuin University every semester, and around 200 Japanese students participate in the university's study abroad programs each year.

== Campus ==
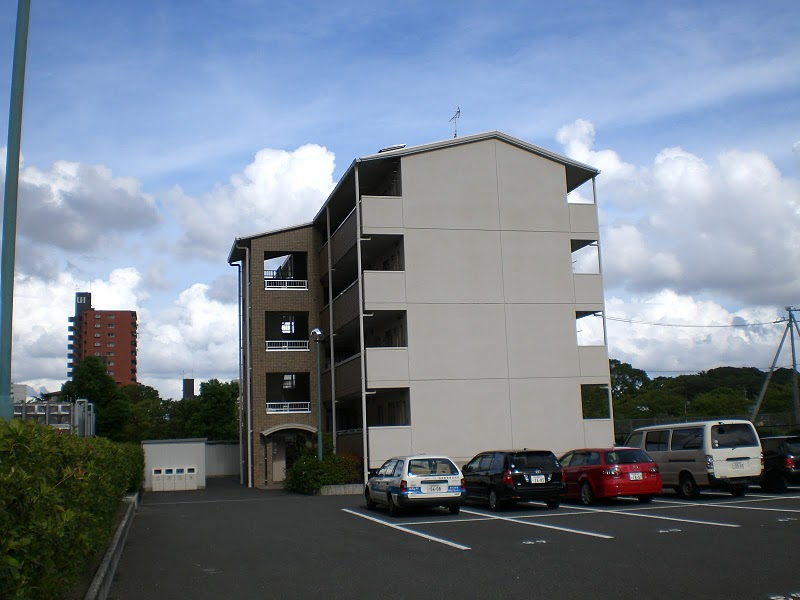
Nagoya Gakuin University, International Seminar House

Currently, the main campus is located near the Hibino subway station (日比野駅) in Atsuta-ku, Nagoya, Aichi Prefecture.

Adjacent to Shirotori Park (白鳥公園), and walking distance from Nagoya Congress Center (名古屋国際会議場), the Hibino campus houses dormitories, tennis courts, and an on-campus church. Exchange students coming from abroad to study at NGU also reside on-campus in the International Seminar House.

Prior to April 2007, the campus was located in Seto, perched upon a mountainside looking over the greater Nagoya region.

Geographically, Nagoya Gakuin University is located at 35.128559°N 136.899087°E

== Student Activities ==
Nagoya Gakuin University has over fifty athletic, cultural and social organizations available for students to participate in. Additionally, martial arts such as Karate, Judo, Kendo and Shorinji Kempo are available.

Each autumn, NGU holds its annual school festival, featuring events and activities organized by both the Japanese and international students.

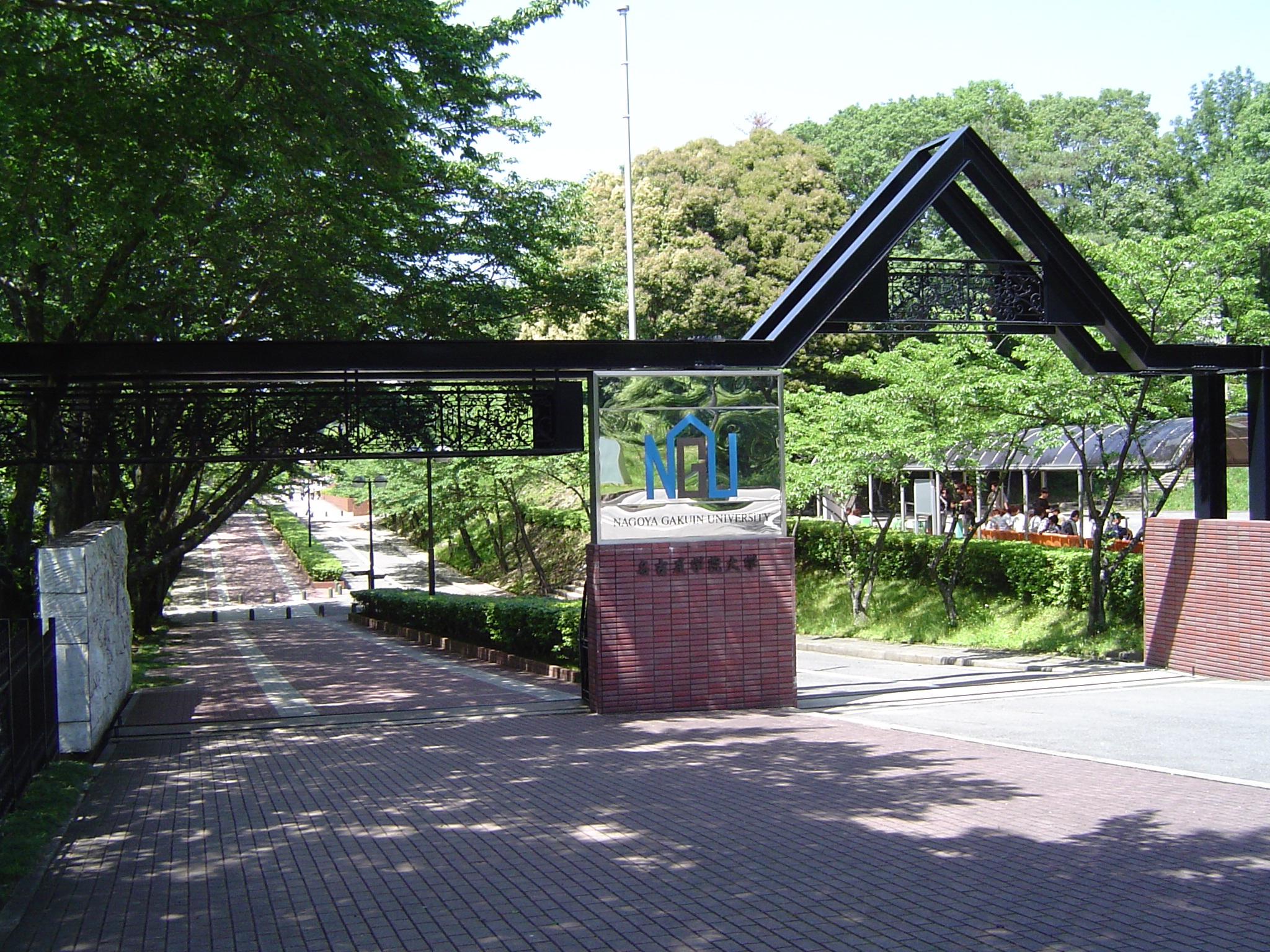
Nagoya Gakuin University, Former Seto Campus

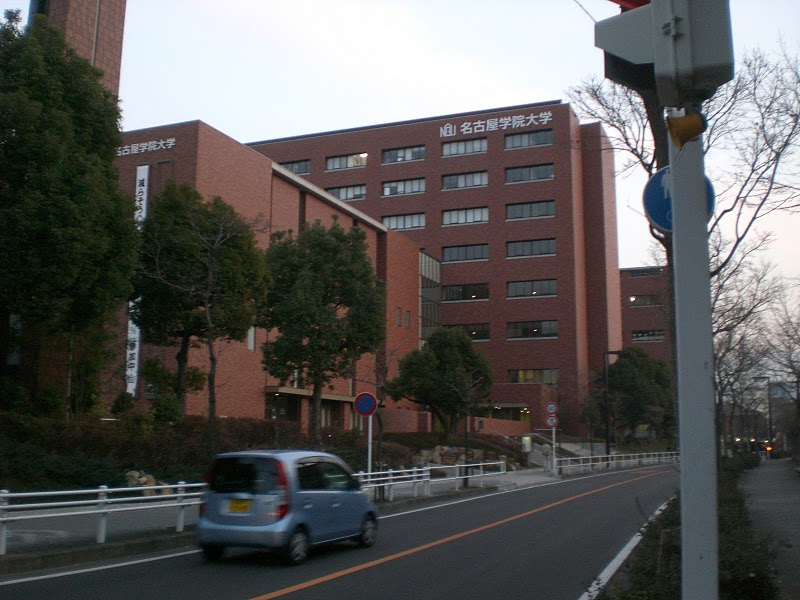
Nagoya Gakuin University, Hibino Campus

== Departments ==
- CIEP - Center for International Exchange Programs
  - IJS - Institute for Japanese Studies
- Faculty of Commerce
  - Department of Commerce
  - Department of Information Business and Communication
- Faculty of Economics
  - Department of Economics
  - Department of Policy Studies
- Faculty of Foreign Studies
  - Department of English
  - Department of Chinese Communication
  - Department of International Culture and Cooperation
- Faculty of Health and Sports
  - Department of Health Science
  - Department of Rehabilitation Science
- Faculty of Law
- Graduate School of Economics and Business Administration
