= Atsuta Jingu Temma-cho Station =

Metro station in Nagoya, Japan

Coordinates: 35.1208°N 136.9102°E

M26 Atsuta Jingu Temma-cho Station 熱田神宮伝馬町駅
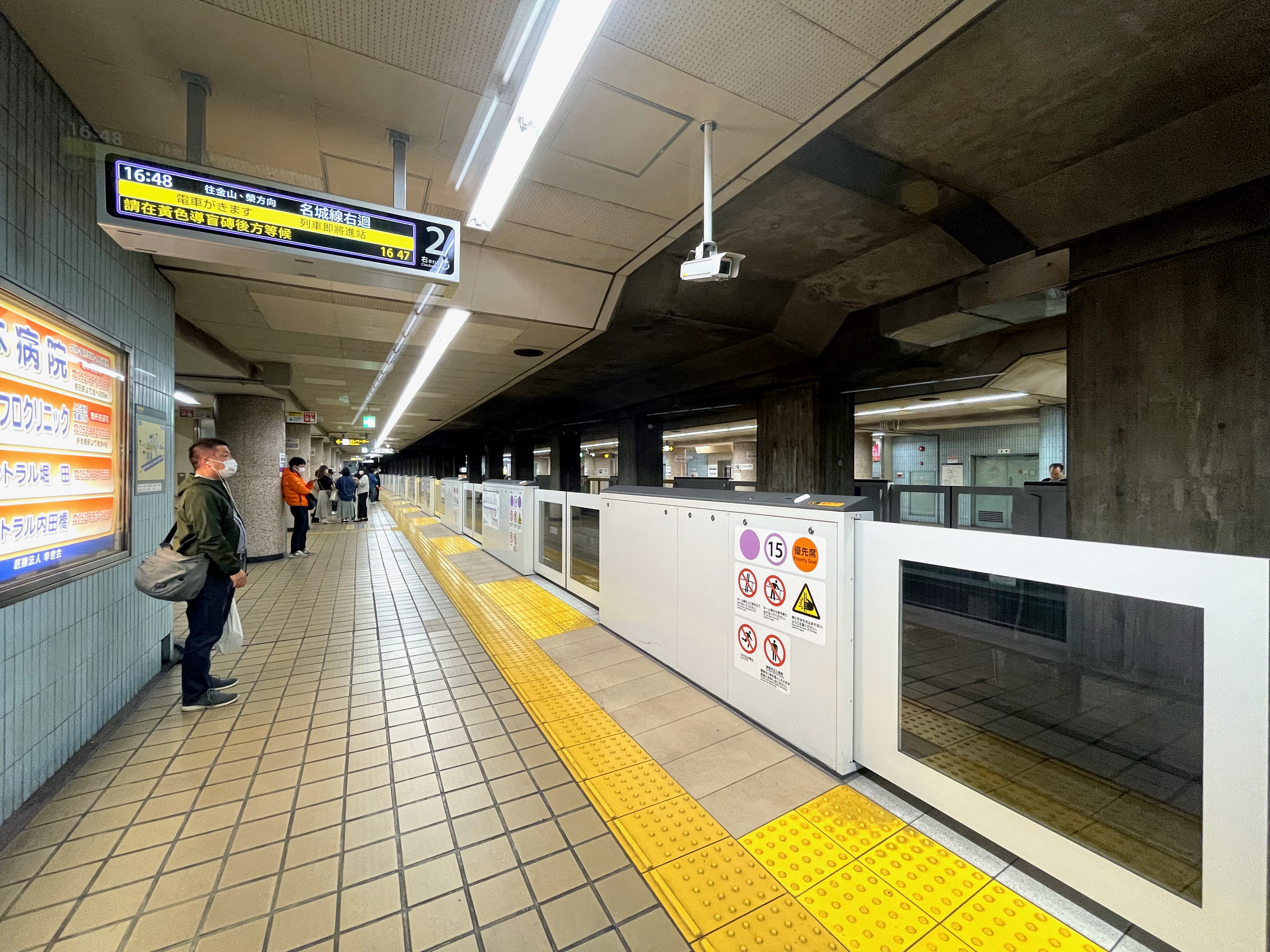

General information
- Location: Temma 2-1-1, Atsuta, Nagoya, Aichi （名古屋市熱田区伝馬二丁目1-1） Japan
- System: Nagoya Municipal Subway station
- Operator: Transportation Bureau City of Nagoya
- Line: Meijō Line
- Connections: Bus stop

Other information
- Station code: M26

History
- Opened: 30 March 1974; 52 years ago

Passengers
- 2009: 6,420 daily

Services
| Preceding station | Nagoya Municipal Subway | Following station |
|---|---|---|
| Horita M25 anticlockwise | Meijō Line | Atsuta Jingu Nishi M27 clockwise |
Location

Atsuta Jingu Temma-cho Station (熱田神宮伝馬町駅, Atsuta-Jingū-Tenmachō-eki) is an underground metro station located in Atsuta-ku, Nagoya, Aichi Prefecture, Japan operated by the Nagoya Municipal Subway's Meijō Line. It is located 23.4 kilometers from the terminus of the Meijō Line at Kanayama Station. This station provides access to Atsuta Shrine.

== History ==
The station was opened on 30 March 1974. The station was originally called Temma-cho Station (伝馬町駅, Tenmachō-eki) and its name was changed on 4 January 2023.

== Lines ==
- Nagoya Municipal Subway
  - Meijō Line (Station number: M26)

== Layout ==
Atsuta Jingu Temma-cho Station has two underground opposed side platforms.

=== Platforms ===
| 1 | ■ Meijō Line | For Aratama-bashi and Yagoto |
| 2 | ■ Meijō Line | For Kanayama and Sakae |
