= Atsuta-ku =

Atsuta 熱田区
- Ward
- Atsuta Ward
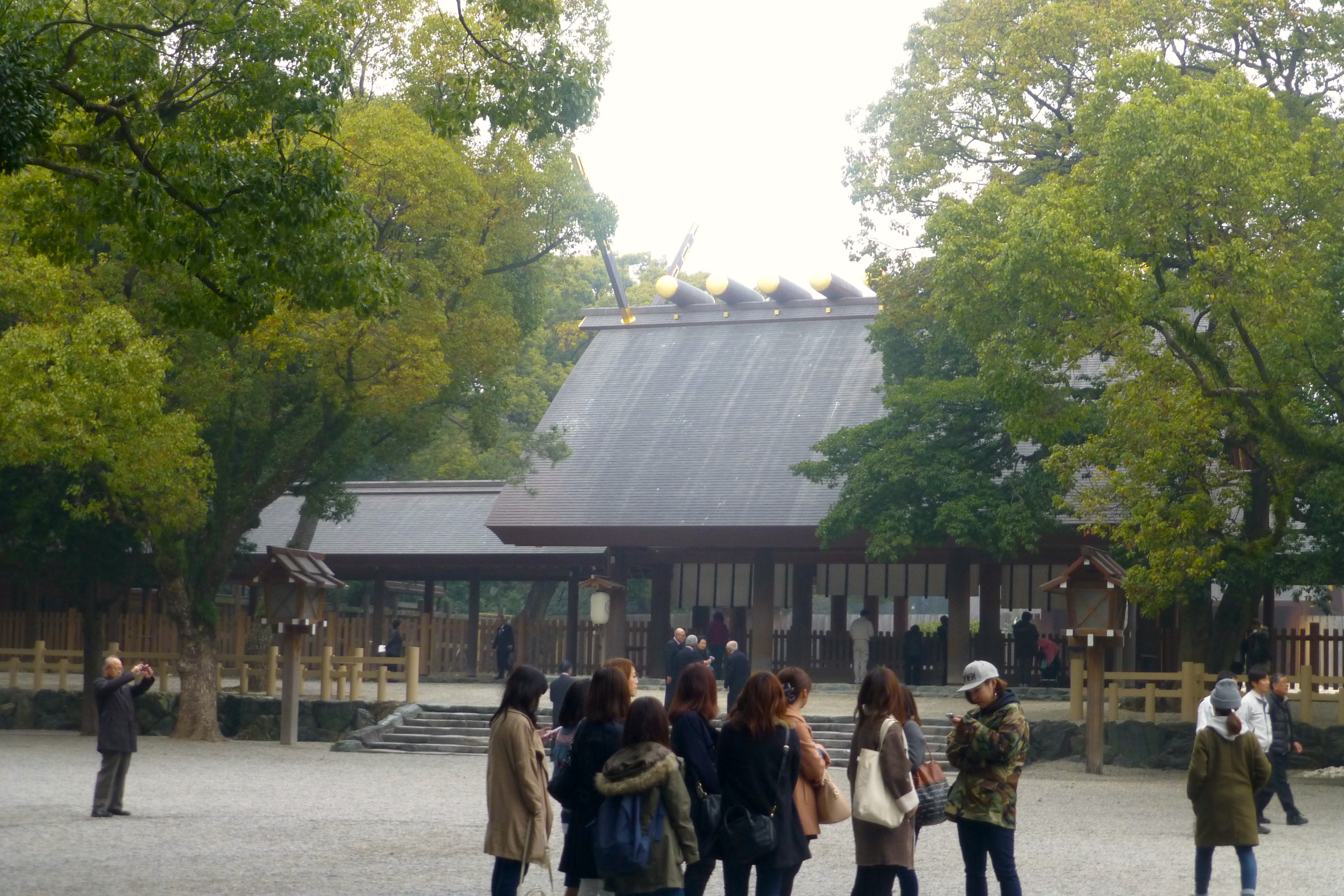
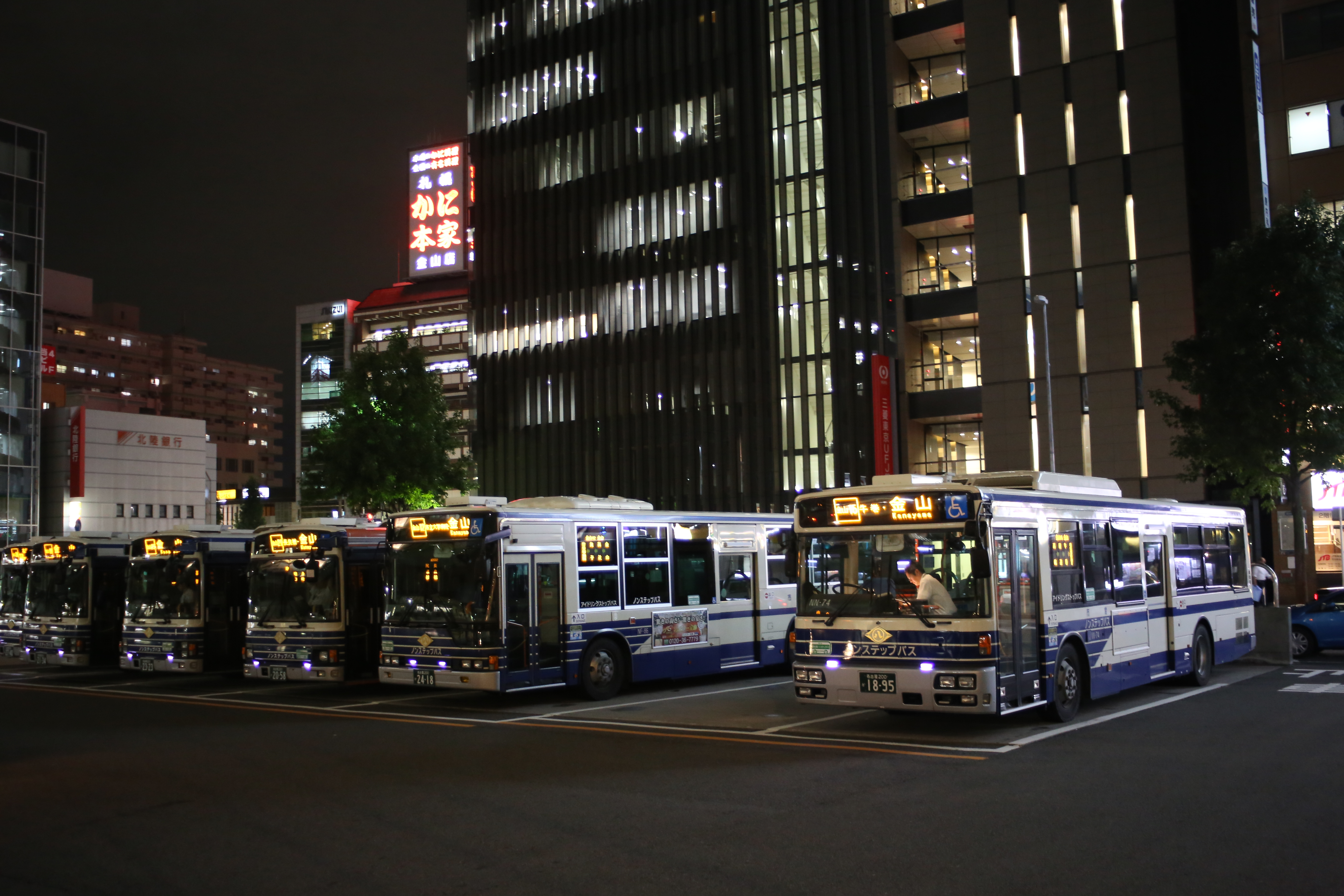
- Atsuta Shrine; Kanayama Bus Terminal night view

- Location of Atsuta-ku in Nagoya

- Coordinates: 35°07′41″N 136°54′40″E
- Country: Japan
- Region: Tōkai region Chūbu region
- Prefecture: Aichi

Area
  - Total: 8.20 km^{2} (3.17 sq mi)

Population (1 October 2019)
  - Total: 66,318
  - Density: 8,090/km^{2} (20,900/sq mi)
- Time zone: UTC+9 (Japan Standard Time)
  - Tree: Round Leaf Holly (Ilex rotunda)
  - Flower: Japanese iris
- Phone number: 052-961-1111
- Address: 3-1-15 Jingu, Atsuta-ku, Nagoya-shi, Aichi-ken 460-8508
- Website: www.city.nagoya.jp/atsuta/ (in Japanese)

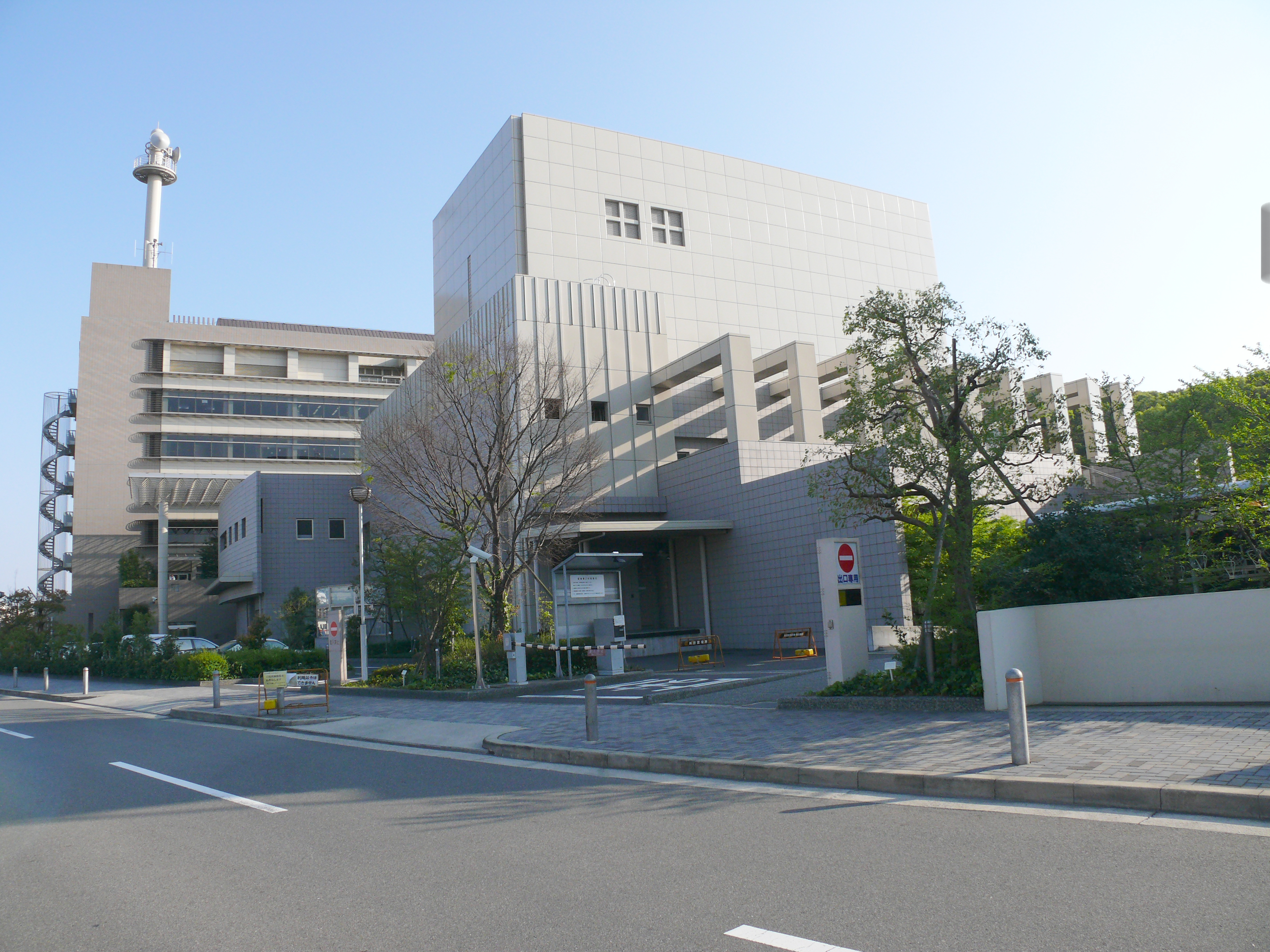
Atsuta-ku Ward Office

Atsuta (熱田区, Atsuta-ku) is one of the 16 wards of the city of Nagoya in Aichi Prefecture, Japan. As of 1 October 2019, the ward had an estimated population of 66,318 and a population density of 8,088 persons per km^{2}. The total area was 8.20 km^{2}.

== Geography ==
Atsuta Ward is located near the geographic center of Nagoya city.

=== Surrounding municipalities ===
- Showa Ward
- Naka Ward
- Nakagawa Ward
- Mizuho Ward
- Minato Ward
- Minami Ward

== History ==
The area of present-day Atsuta Ward was known since ancient times for its association with Atsuta Shrine. Atsuta Town in Aichi District was incorporated with the establishment of the municipality system in the early Meiji period. It was annexed to the city of Nagoya, initially as part of Minami Ward, and became Atsuta Ward in 1937.

== Economy ==
Atsuta Ward is a major commercial center due to its proximity to the center of Nagoya metropolis. The rolling stock manufacturer Nippon Sharyo has its headquarters in the ward.

== Education ==
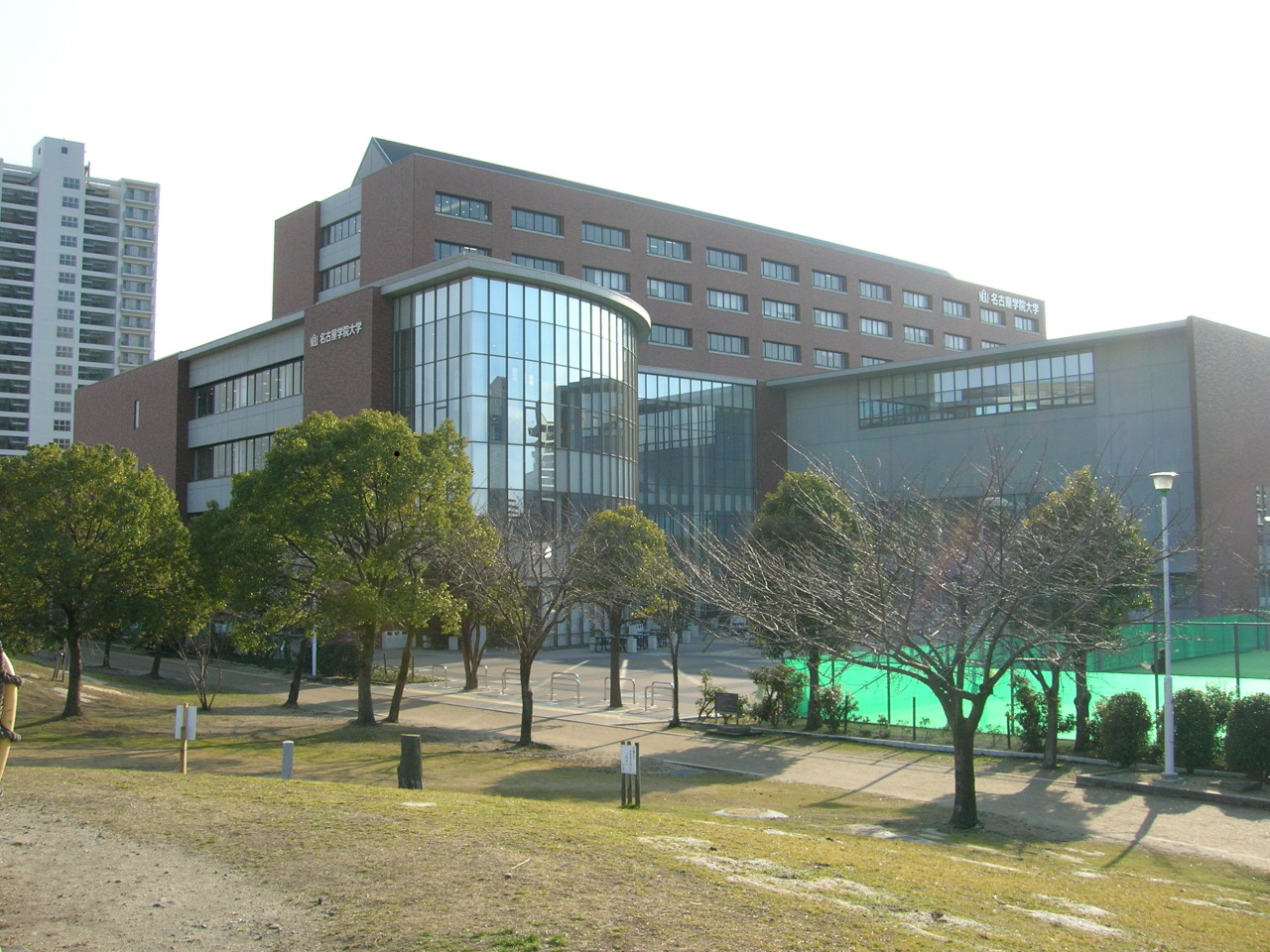
Nagoya Gakuin University

- Nagoya Gakuin University

== Transportation ==
=== Railroads ===
- Central Japan Railway Company – Tōkaidō Main Line
  - Atsuta
- Meitetsu – Nagoya Main Line – Tokoname Line
  - Kanayama -Jingū-mae
- Nagoya Municipal Subway – Meijō Line
  - Temma-chō -Jingū-Nishi -Nishi Takakura
- Nagoya Municipal Subway – Meikō Line
  - Hibino -Rokuban-chō

=== Highways ===
- Japan National Route 1
- Japan National Route 19
- Japan National Route 22
- Japan National Route 154
- Japan National Route 19
- Japan National Route 247

== Local attractions ==
- Atsuta Shrine – well known Shinto shrine

== Noted people ==
- Minamoto no Yoritomo – first shōgun of the Kamakura period, born at Seigan-ji
- Noriyuki Haga –motorcycle racer
- Yukiko Okada – Idol Singer
- Tamaasuka Daisuke – Sumo wrestler
