= Tōkai-dōri Station =

Metro station in Nagoya, Japan

Coordinates: 35.1136°N 136.8873°E

E04 Tōkai-dōri Station 東海通駅
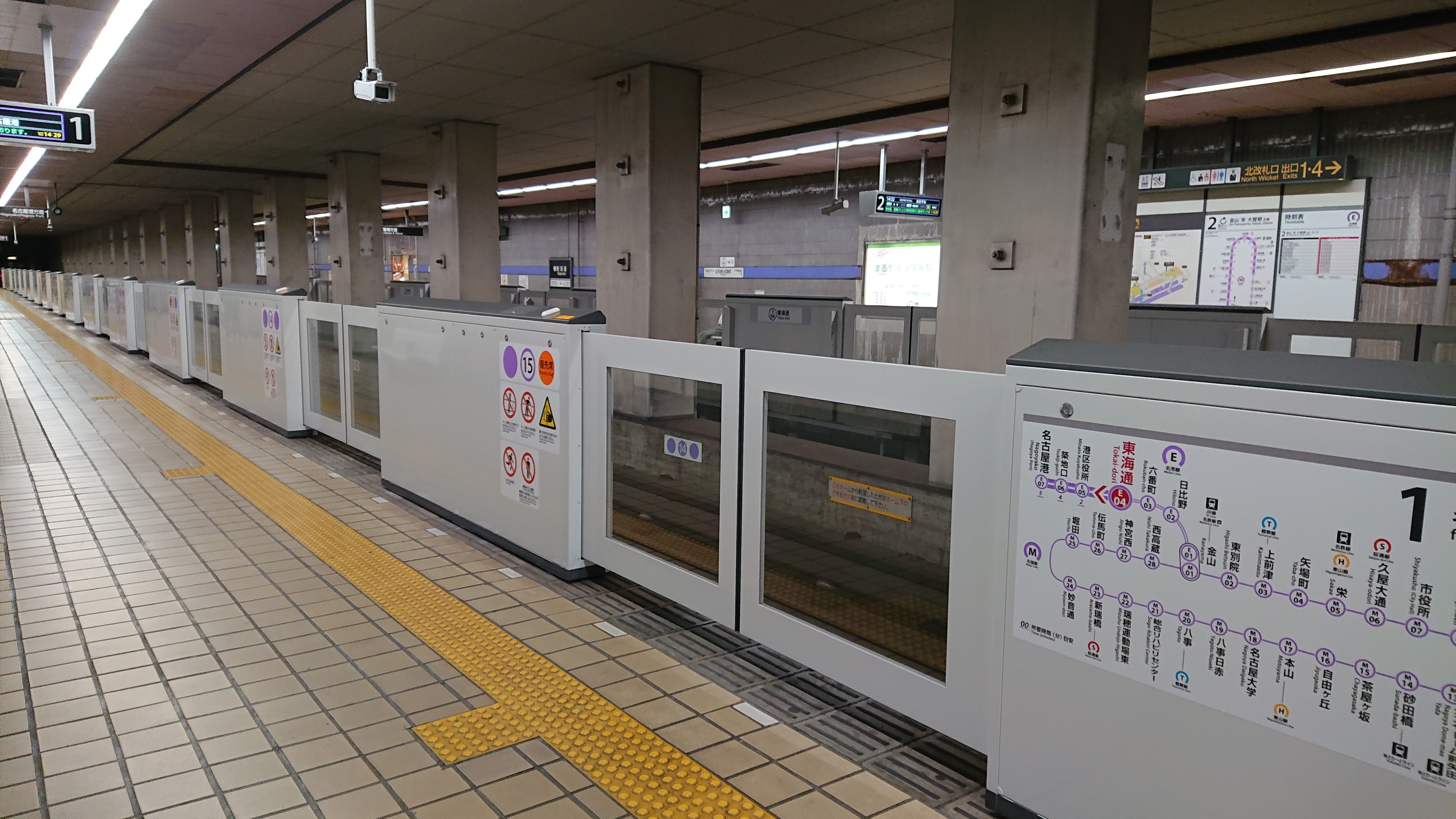

General information
- Location: Tōkai-dōri 3-177, Minato, Nagoya, Aichi （名古屋市港区東海通三丁目177） Japan
- System: Nagoya Municipal Subway station
- Operator: Transportation Bureau City of Nagoya
- Line: Meikō Line
- Connections: Bus terminal

Other information
- Station code: E4

History
- Opened: 29 March 1971; 55 years ago

Passengers
- 2008: 2,560,618

Services
Preceding station	Nagoya Municipal Subway	Following station
Minato Kuyakusho E05 towards Nagoyakō	Meikō Line	Rokuban-chō E03 towards Kanayama
Location

Tōkai-dōri Station (東海通駅, Tōkai-dōri-eki) is an underground metro station located in Minato-ku, Nagoya, Aichi, Japan operated by the Nagoya Municipal Subway's Meikō Line. It is located 3.8 kilometers from the terminus of the Meikō Line at Kanayama Station.

== History ==
Tōkai-dōri Station opened on March 29, 1971.

== Lines ==
- Nagoya Municipal Subway
  - Meikō Line (Station number: E4)

== Layout ==
Tōkai-dōri Station has two underground opposed side platforms.

=== Platforms ===
1	■ Meikō Line	For Nagoyakō
2	■ Meikō Line	For Kanayama, Sakae, and Ōzone

There are two sets of automatic ticket gates, the North Gates, beyond which are Exit 1 and Exit 4, and the South Gates, beyond which are Exit 2 and Exit 3. Each platform has an elevator and an up escalator. Near Exit 4 is a public telephone. There are handicapped-accessible bathrooms with a baby changing area inside the North Wicket. On Platform 1 for Nagoyakō Station, train door 1 is closest to the elevator, and train doors 1 and 18 are closest to the stairs and the escalators. On the opposite platform, Platform 2 for Kanayama Station, train door 18 is closest to the elevator and escalator, and doors 1 and 18 are closest to the stairs.

== Lines ==
- Nagoya Municipal Subway
  - Meikō Line (Station E04)
