= Higashi Betsuin Station =

Metro station in Nagoya, Japan

Coordinates: 35.1504°N 136.9050°E

M02 Higashi Betsuin Station 東別院駅
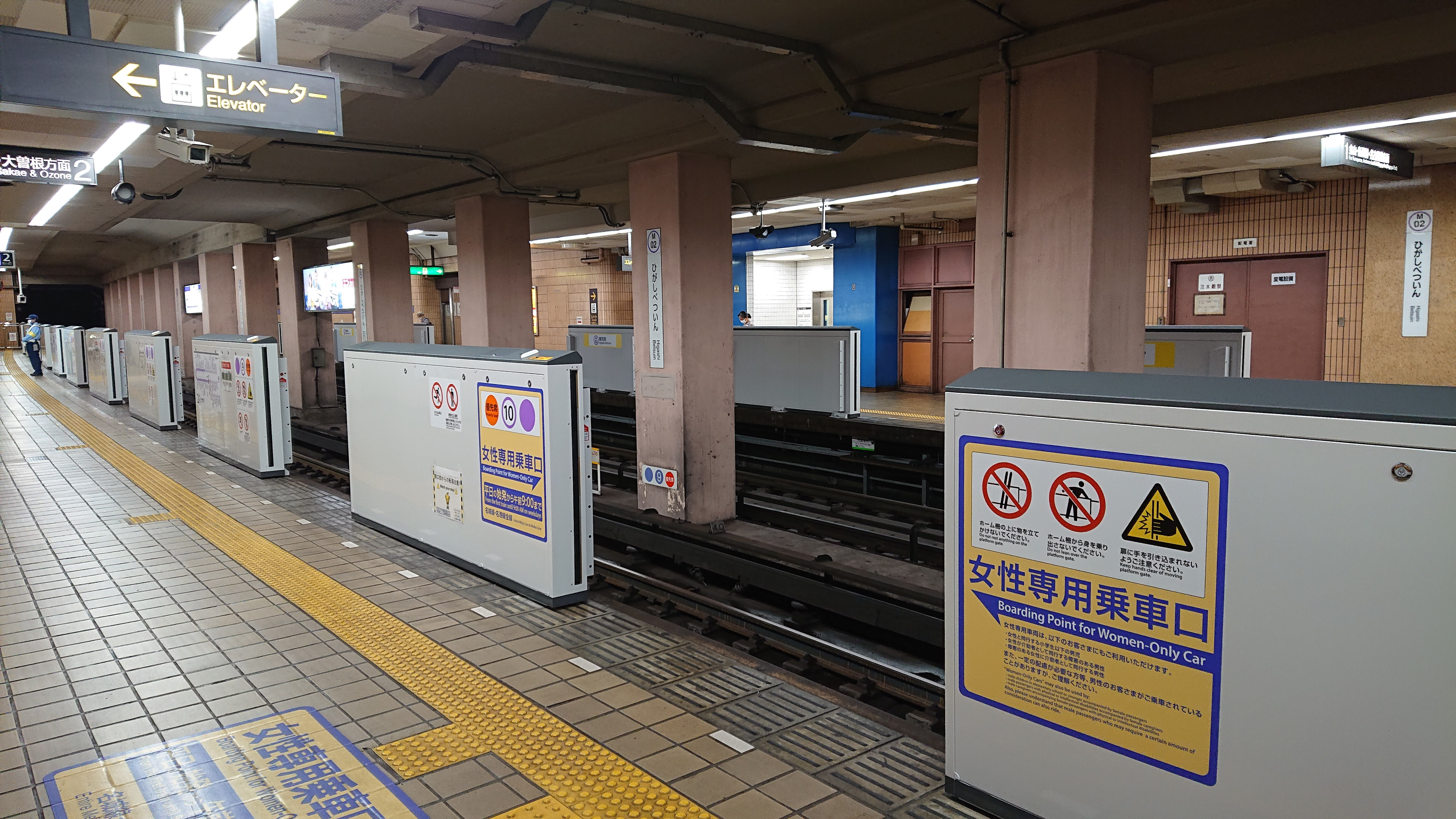

General information
- Location: 3-24 Ōimachi, Naka, Nagoya, Aichi （名古屋市中区大井町3-24） Japan
- System: Nagoya Municipal Subway station
- Operator: Transportation Bureau City of Nagoya
- Line: Meijō Line
- Connections: Bus terminal

Other information
- Station code: M02

History
- Opened: 30 March 1967; 59 years ago

Passengers
- 2008: 6,098 daily

Services
Preceding station	Nagoya Municipal Subway	Following station
Kanayama M01 anticlockwise	Meijō Line	Kamimaezu M03 clockwise
Location

Higashi Betsuin Station (東別院駅, Higashi Betsuin-eki) is an underground metro station located in Naka-ku, Nagoya, Aichi Prefecture, Japan operated by the Nagoya Municipal Subway. It is located 0.7 rail kilometers from the terminus of the Meijō Line at Kanayama Station. It is close to Nagoya Broadcasting Network and Higashi Betsuin Temple, after which it is named. Higashi Betsuin is an abbreviation of the name Higashi Hongan-ji Nagoya Betsuin, a Buddhist temple known formally as Shinshuōtaniha Nagoya Betsuin, which is a temple associated with the temple in Kyoto called Higashi Hongan-ji.

== History ==
Higashi Betsuin Station was opened on 30 March 1967.

== Lines ==
- Nagoya Municipal Subway
  - Meijō Line (Station number: M02)

== Layout ==
Higashi Betsuin Station has two underground opposed side platforms. The platforms are as follows:

=== Platforms ===
1	■ Meijō Line	For Kanayama, Aratamabashi, and Nagoyakō (counterclockwise)
2	■ Meijō Line	For Sakae and Ōzone (clockwise)

Because the station is next to Nagoya Broadcasting Network, the network's common name, Mētere, and mascot, Wandaho, are displayed on the platforms' walls. There are two wickets. There are four exits in two pairs, namely Exit 1 and Exit 2, and Exit 3 and Exit 4. The station is equipped with elevators, so it is handicapped-accessible, as is the station's bathroom.

== See also ==
- ja:真宗大谷派名古屋別院 Shinshuōtaniha Nagoya Betsuin (真宗大谷派名古屋別院, Shinshuōtani-ha Nagoya Betsuin) (in Japanese)
- Nagoya Broadcasting Network
