= Hibino Station =

Hibino Station is the name of two train stations in Japan:

- Hibino Station (Aisai, Aichi)
- Hibino Station (Nagoya, Aichi)
