= Nishi Takakura Station =

Metro station in Nagoya, Japan

Coordinates: 35.1347°N 136.9019°E

M28 Nishi Takakura Station 西高蔵駅
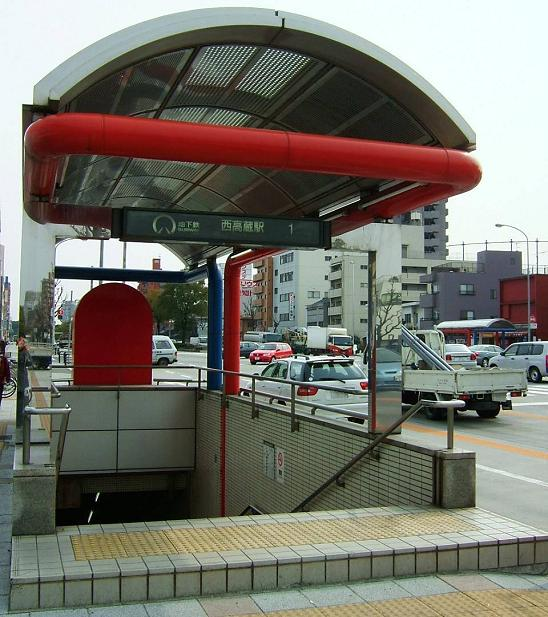

General information
- Location: 9-34 Gohonmatsu, Atsuta, Nagoya, Aichi （名古屋市熱田区五本松町9-34） Japan
- System: Nagoya Municipal Subway station
- Operator: Transportation Bureau City of Nagoya
- Line: Meijō Line
- Connections: Bus stop

Other information
- Station code: M28

History
- Opened: 30 March 1974; 52 years ago

Passengers
- 2007 (Daily): 2,561

Services
Preceding station	Nagoya Municipal Subway	Following station
Atsuta Jingu Nishi M27 anticlockwise	Meijō Line	Kanayama M01 clockwise
Location

Nishi Takakura Station (西高蔵駅, Nishi Takakura-eki) is an underground metro station located in Atsuta-ku, Nagoya, Aichi Prefecture, Japan operated by the Nagoya Municipal Subway's Meijō Line. It is located 25.3 kilometers from the terminus of the Meijō Line at Kanayama Station. This station provides access to Shirotori Park, Atsuta Shrine Park, and Takakura Park.

== History ==
Nishi Takakura Station was opened on 30 March 1974.

== Lines ==
- Nagoya Municipal Subway
  - Meijō Line (Station number: M28)

== Layout ==
Nishi Takakura Station has two underground opposed side platforms.

=== Platforms ===
1	■ Meijō Line	For Aratama-bashi and Yagoto
2	■ Meijō Line	For Kanayama and Sakae
