= Meijō Line =

Subway line in Nagoya, Japan

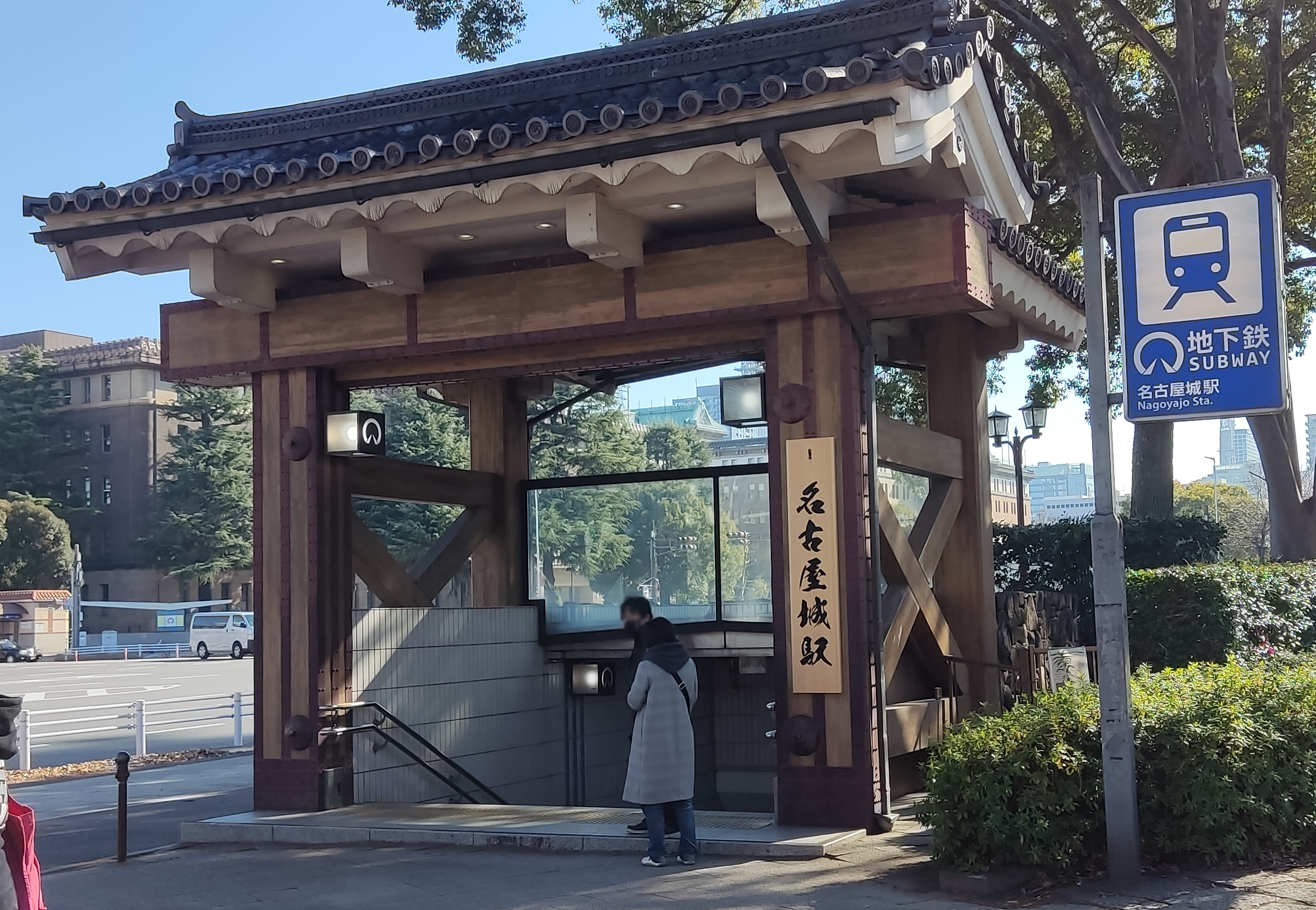
- Entrance to Nagoyajo (Nagoya Castle) Station

Overview
- Native name: 名城線
- Locale: Nagoya, Aichi
- Stations: 28

Service
- Type: Rapid transit
- System: Nagoya Municipal Subway
- Operator: Nagoya City Transportation Bureau
- Depot(s): Daiko (between Nagoya Dome-mae Yada and Sunadabashi)
- Rolling stock: 2000 series
- Daily ridership: 197,082 (2008) (including Meikō Line)

History
- Opened: 15 October 1965; 61 years ago
- Last extension: 2004

Technical
- Track length: 26.4 km (16.4 mi)
- Track gauge: 1,435 mm (4 ft 8 1/2 in) standard gauge
- Electrification: Third rail 600 V DC
- Operating speed: 65 km/h (40 mph)

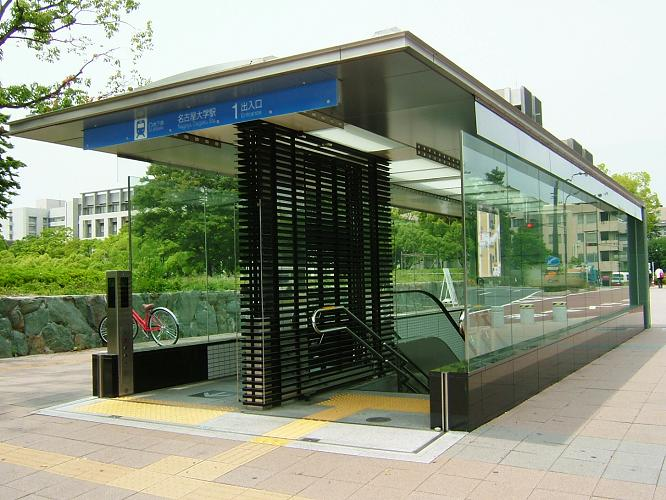
Nagoya Daigaku Station

The Meijō Line (名城線, Meijō-sen) is a subway line in Nagoya, Japan, part of the Nagoya Municipal Subway system. It is a loop line that runs from Kanayama, via Sakae, Ōzone, Nagoya Daigaku, and back to Kanayama, all within Nagoya. The Meijō Line's color on maps is wisteria purple and stations are labeled with the prefix "M". Officially, the line consists of the Nagoya City Rapid Railway Line 2 (名古屋市高速度鉄道第2号線, Nagoya-shi Kōsokudo Tetsudō Dai-ni-gō-sen), the western part, and Line 4 (第4号線, Dai-yon-gō-sen), the eastern part. All stations accept manaca, a rechargeable contactless smart card, and other major Japanese IC cards.

The Meijō Line, upon its completion, became the second loop subway line built in Japan, after the Toei Ōedo Line. The Ōedo Line, however, is not a true loop line as it is operated like a figure 6, with trains from the western Hikarigaoka terminus running counterclockwise around the loop and terminating at Tochōmae, returning around the loop to Hikarigaoka. Thus the Meijō Line is the first (and currently only) true subway loop line in the country. The line is longer than the JR Ōsaka Loop Line (21.7 km or 13.5 mi), but shorter than the JR Yamanote Line (34.5 km or 21.4 mi). It takes 48 minutes to complete the loop.

The name Meijō is derived from the abbreviated kanji of Nagoya Castle (名古屋城, Nagoya-jō).

== Stations ==
The line is entirely underground, including the Meikō Line.

Stations listed clockwise
No.	Station name	Japanese	Distance (km)		Transfers	Location
No.	Station name	Japanese	Between stations	Total	Transfers	Location
M01	Kanayama	金山	-	0.0	Nagoya Municipal Subway: Kanayama Line ^{1} Meikō Line (E-01) ^{2} Chūō Main Line; Tōkaidō Main Line; Meitetsu Nagoya Line	Naka
M02	Higashi Betsuin	東別院	0.7	0.7		Naka
M03	Kamimaezu	上前津	0.9	1.6	Tsurumai Line (T-09)	Naka
M04	Yabachō	矢場町	0.7	2.3	Nagoya Municipal Subway: Tōbu Line ^{1}	Naka
M05	Sakae	栄	0.7	3.0	Meitetsu Seto Line (Sakaemachi); Higashiyama Line (H-10)	Naka
M06	Hisaya-ōdōri	久屋大通	0.4	3.4	Sakura-dōri Line (S-05)	Naka
M07	Nagoyajo (Nagoya Castle)	名古屋城	0.9	4.3		Naka
M08	Meijō Kōen	名城公園	1.1	5.4		Kita
M09	Kurokawa	黒川	1.0	6.4	Nagoya Municipal Subway: Kanayama Line ^{1}	Kita
M10	Shiga-hondōri	志賀本通	1.0	7.4		Kita
M11	Heian-dōri	平安通	0.8	8.2	Kamiiida Line (K-02)	Kita
M12	Ōzone	大曽根	0.7	8.9	Chūō Main Line; Meitetsu Seto Line; Yutorito Line (Y01)	Kita
M13	Nagoya Dome-mae Yada	ナゴヤドーム前矢田	0.8	9.7	Yutorito Line (Y02)	Higashi
M14	Sunadabashi	砂田橋	0.9	10.6	Yutorito Line (Y03)	Higashi
M15	Chayagasaka	茶屋ヶ坂	0.9	11.5		Chikusa
M16	Jiyūgaoka	自由ヶ丘	1.2	12.7		Chikusa
M17	Motoyama	本山	1.4	14.1	Higashiyama Line (H-16)	Chikusa
M18	Nagoya Daigaku	名古屋大学	1.0	15.1	Nagoya Municipal Subway: Tōbu Line ^{1}	Chikusa
M19	Yagoto Nisseki	八事日赤	1.1	16.2		Shōwa
M20	Yagoto	八事	1.0	17.2	Tsurumai Line (T-15)	Shōwa
M21	Sōgō Rihabiri Center	総合リハビリセンター	1.3	18.5		Mizuho
M22	Mizuho Undōjō Higashi	瑞穂運動場東	1.0	19.5		Mizuho
M23	Aratama-bashi	新瑞橋	1.2	20.7	Sakura-dōri Line (S-14)	Mizuho
M24	Myōon-dōri	妙音通	0.7	21.4		Mizuho
M25	Horita	堀田	0.8	22.2		Mizuho
M26	Atsuta Jingu Temma-cho	熱田神宮伝馬町	1.2	23.4		Atsuta
M27	Atsuta Jingu Nishi	熱田神宮西	1.0	24.4		Atsuta
M28	Nishi Takakura	西高蔵	0.9	25.3		Atsuta
M01	Kanayama	金山	1.1	26.4		Naka

^{1}: Planned lines.
^{2}: Through service to/from Meijō Line.

== Meikō Line ==
Meikō Line

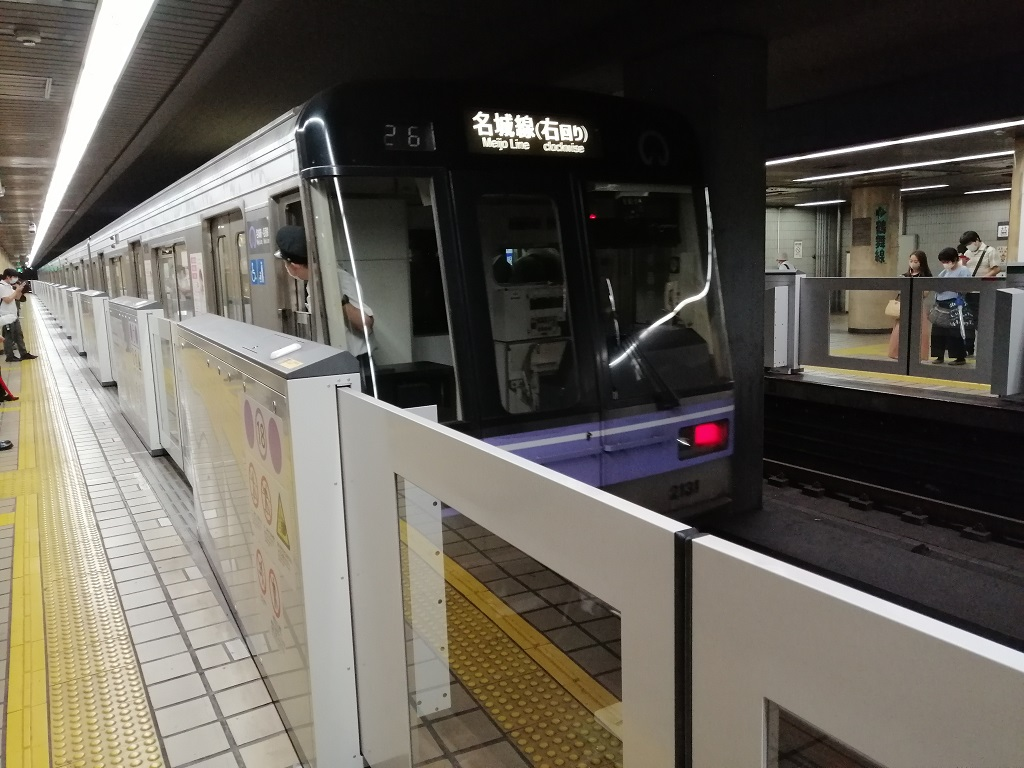

Overview
- Native name: 名港線
- Locale: Nagoya
- Termini: Kanayama; Nagoyakō
- Stations: 7

Service
- Type: Rapid transit
- System: Nagoya Municipal Subway
- Operator: Nagoya City Transportation Bureau
- Depot: Nagoyakō
- Rolling stock: 2000 series

History
- Opened: 29 March 1971; 55 years ago

Technical
- Track length: 6.0 km (3.7 mi)
- Num of tracks: 2
- Track gauge: 1,435 mm (4 ft 8 1/2 in) standard gauge
- Electrification: 600V DC Third rail

The Meikō Line (名港線, Meikō-sen) acts as a branch line from the Meijō line, with roughly every other anticlockwise train running toward Nagoyakō instead of Nagoya Daigaku. The Meikō Line's color on maps is a stripe of wisteria purple and white, and stations are labeled with the prefix "E". Officially, the line is part of Nagoya City Rapid Railway Line 2. The line provides through service to the Meijō Line.

=== Stations ===
No.	Station name	Japanese	Distance (km)		Transfers	Location
No.	Station name	Japanese	Between stations	Total	Transfers	Location
↑ Through-services to/from Ōzone, Nagoya Dome-mae Yada via the Meijō Line ↑
E01	Kanayama	金山	-	0.0	Nagoya Municipal Subway: Kanayama Line ^{1} Meijō Line (M-01) ^{2} Chūō Main Line; Tōkaidō Main Line; Meitetsu Nagoya Line	Naka
E02	Hibino	日比野	1.5	1.5		Atsuta
E03	Rokuban-chō	六番町	1.1	2.6		Atsuta
E04	Tōkai-dōri	東海通	1.2	3.8		Minato
E05	Minato Kuyakusho	港区役所	0.8	4.6		Minato
E06	Tsukiji-guchi	築地口	0.8	5.4		Minato
E07	Nagoyakō (Nagoya Port)	名古屋港	0.6	6.0		Minato

=== History ===
The line was originally part of the Meijō Line. When the eastern part ("Line 4") of the current loop line was completed in 2004, the entire loop was renamed the Meijō Line, with the remaining section (between Kanayama and Nagoyakō, outside the loop) being renamed to the Meikō Line.

The name Meikō is derived from the abbreviated kanji of Nagoya Port (名古屋港, Nagoya-kō).

== Rolling stock ==
=== Current ===
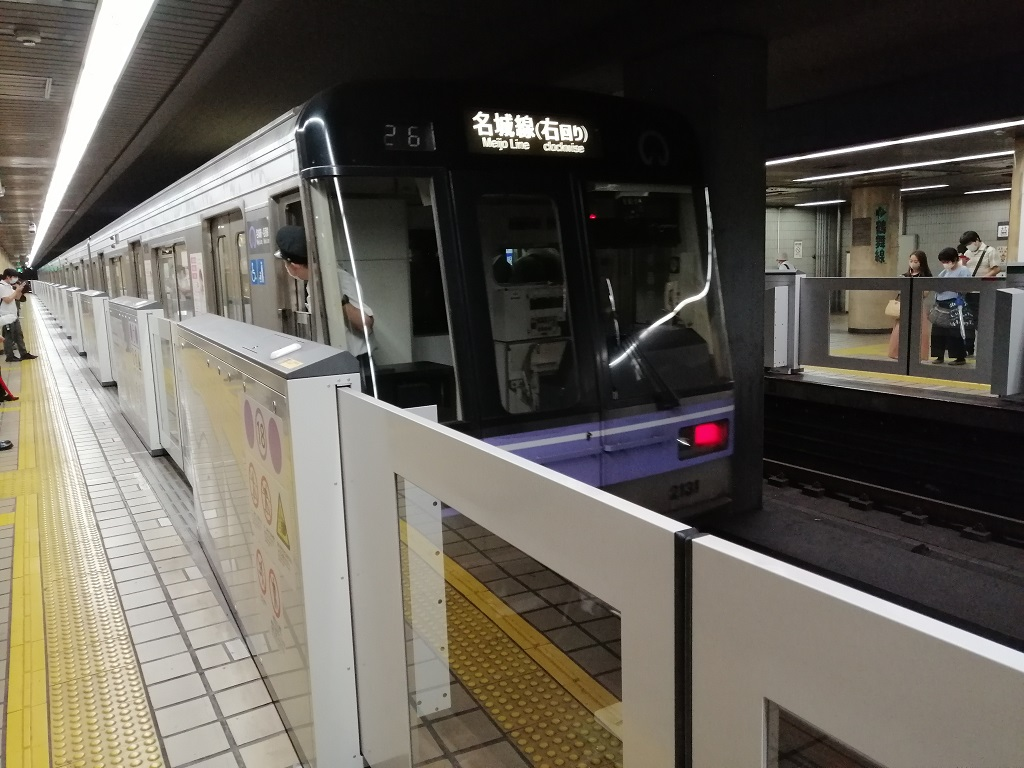
A 2000 series train in August 2020

- 2000 series (since 1989)

=== Former ===
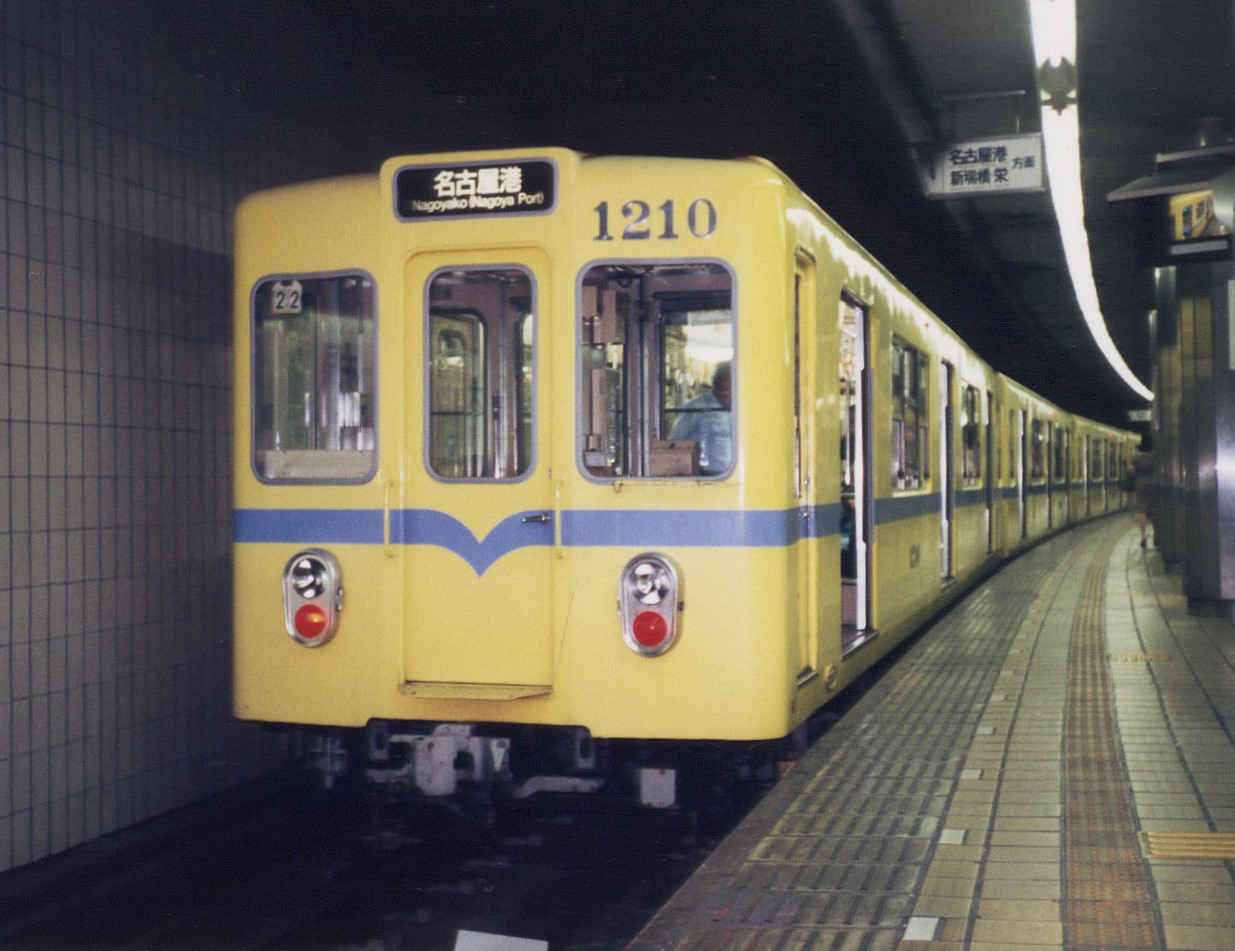
A 1200 series train in September 1999

- 1000/1100/1200 series (from 1965 until 2000)

== History ==
The first section of Line 2, between Sakae-machi (now named Sakae) and Shiyakusho (now named Nagoyajo), opened in 1965. The line was named the Meijō Line in 1969, and the extension was completed in 1971. Line 4 opened its first section between Aratama-bashi and Kanayama in 1974. The extension project was completed in 2004, making a loop line together with Line 2.

Women-only cars were introduced on the line on 4 July 2016, operating in the mornings until 09:00.

== See also ==
- List of railway lines in Japan
