= Japan National Route 154 =

Road in Japan

National Route 154
- 国道154号
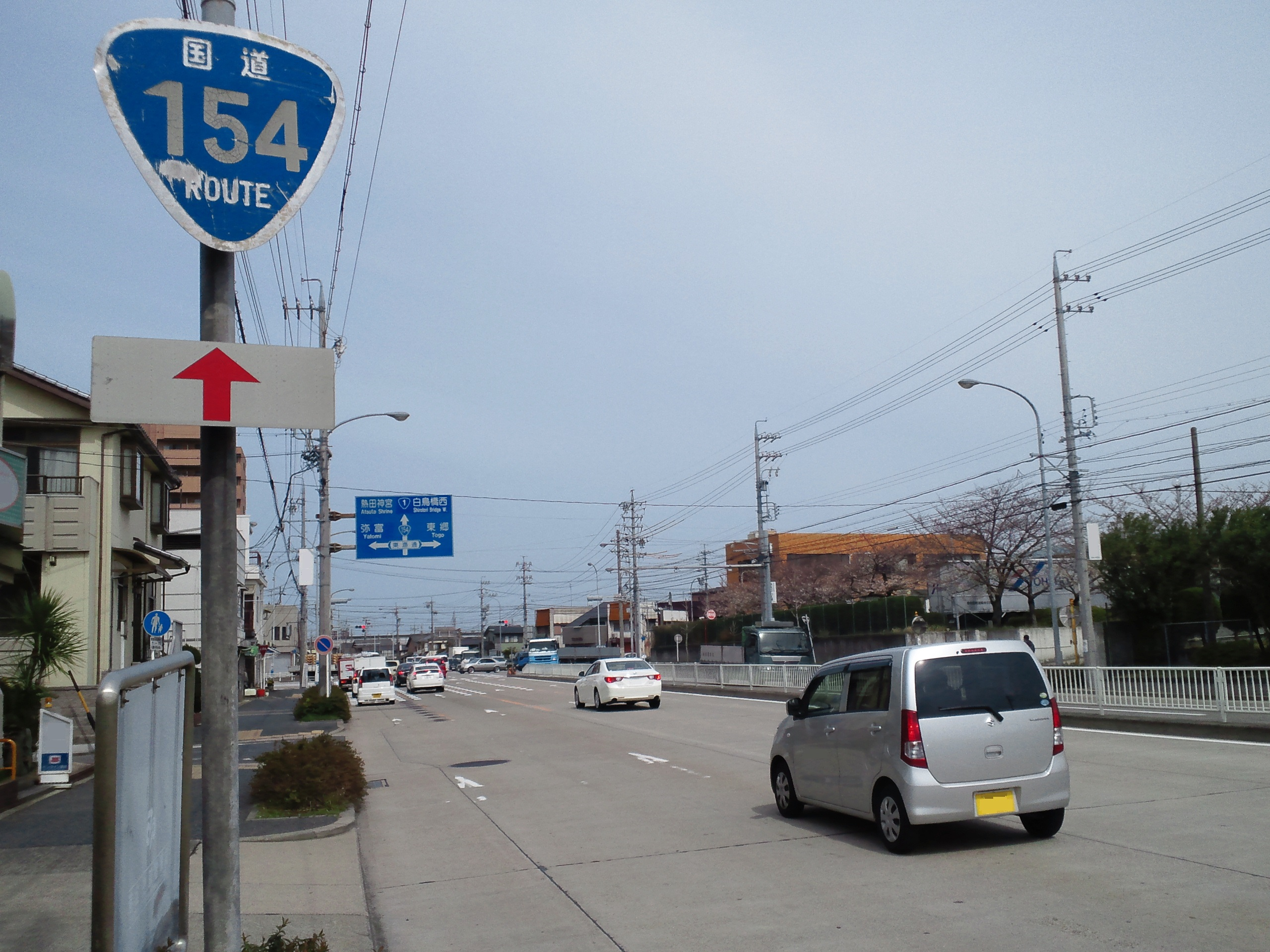

Route information
- Length: 4.0 km (2.5 mi)

Major junctions
- South end: Port of Nagoya, Minato-ku, Nagoya
- National Route 23
- North end: National Route 1 in Atsuta-ku, Nagoya

Location
- Country: Japan

Highway system
- National highways of Japan; Expressways of Japan
← National Route 153	→ National Route 155

National Route 154 is a national highway of Japan connecting Minato-ku, Nagoya and Atsuta-ku, Nagoya in Japan, with a total length of 4 km (2.49 mi).
