= Otōbashi Station =

Railway station in Nagoya, Japan

CA67 Otōbashi Station 尾頭橋駅
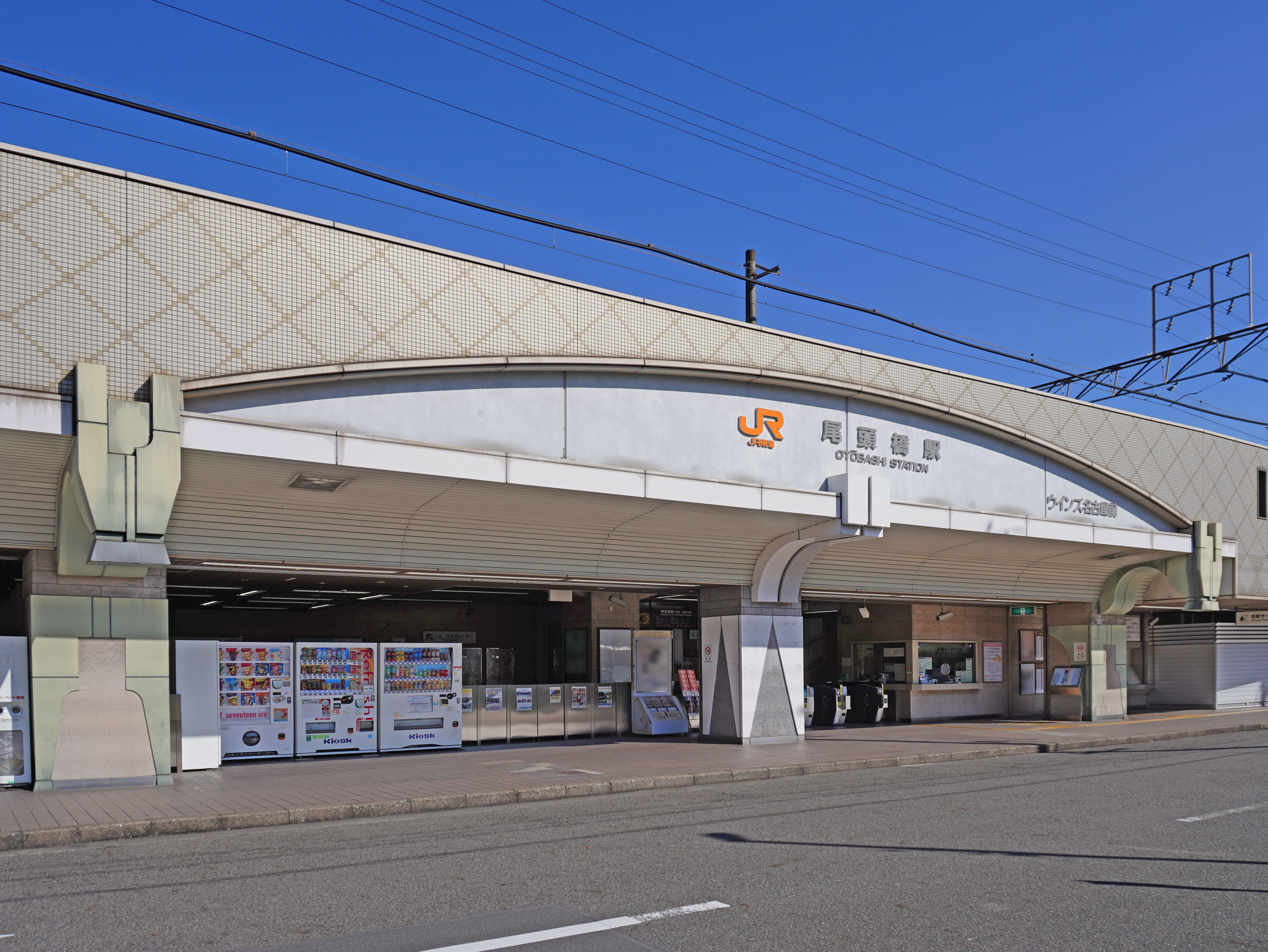
- Otōbashi Station in November 2022

General information
- Location: 4-14-1 Otōbashi, Nakagawa-ku, Nagoya-shi, Aichi-ken 454-0012; Japan
- Coordinates: 35°08′49″N 136°53′28″E
- Operator: JR Central
- Line: Tokaido Main Line
- Distance: 363.6 kilometers from Tokyo
- Platforms: 1 island platform
- Tracks: 2

Construction
- Structure type: Elevated
- Accessible: Yes

Other information
- Status: Staffed
- Station code: CA67
- Website: Official website

History
- Opened: March 16, 1995

Passengers
- 2023–2024: 7,756 daily

Services
Preceding station	JR Central	Following station
Nagoya towards Maibara	Tōkaidō Main Line Local	Kanayama towards Atami
Location
- Location within Aichi Prefecture Location within Japan

Otōbashi Station (尾頭橋駅, Otōbashi-eki) is an infill railway station in Nakagawa-ku, Nagoya, Japan, operated by Central Japan Railway Company (JR Tōkai). Otōbashi Station is served by the Tōkaidō Main Line, and is located 363.6 kilometers from the starting point of the line at Tokyo Station.

== History ==
Otōbashi Station was opened on 16 March 1995 on the site of a former freight terminal operated by the Japan Freight Railway Company.

Station numbering was introduced to the section of the Tōkaidō Line operated JR Central in March 2018; Otōbashi Station was assigned station number CA67.

== Station layout ==
The station has one curved island platform with the station building underneath. The station building has automated ticket machines, TOICA automated turnstiles and a staffed ticket office.

=== Platforms ===
1	■ Tōkaidō Main Line	for Taketoyo and Toyohashi
2	■ Tōkaidō Main Line	for Nagoya and Ōgaki

== Passenger statistics ==
In fiscal 2017, the station was used by an average of 3,504 passengers daily.

== See also ==
- List of railway stations in Japan
