= Nagoya Municipal Subway 2000 series =

Japanese train type

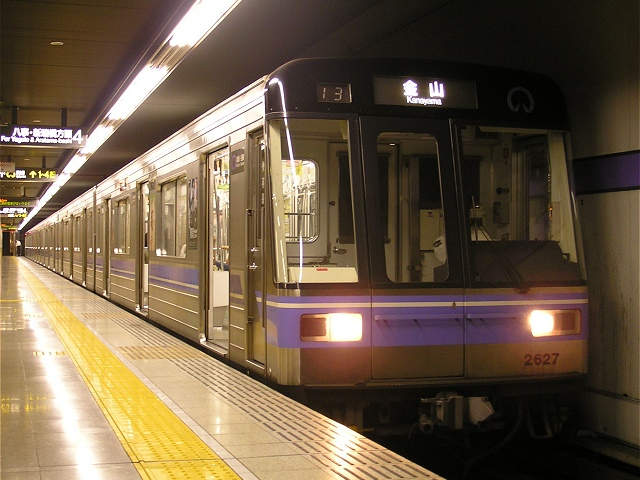
- Nagoya Municipal Subway 2000 series, May 2009
- In service: 1989–Present
- Manufacturer: Hitachi Rail Japan, Nippon Sharyo
- Built at: Hitachi Kasado Works, Kudamatsu, Japan
- Constructed: 1989–2004
- Entered service: 10 June 1989
- Refurbished: 2012–2023
- Number built: 216 vehicles (36 sets)
- Number in service: 216 vehicles (36 sets)
- Formation: 6 cars per trainset
- Capacity: 620
- Operators: Transportation Bureau City of Nagoya
- Depots: Daiko, Nagoyakō
- Lines served: Meijō Line, Meikō Line

Specifications
- Car body construction: Stainless steel
- Car length: 15,580 mm (51 ft 1 in)
- Width: 2,546 mm (8 ft 4.2 in)
- Height: 3,440 mm (11 ft 3 in)
- Maximum speed: 65 km/h (40 mph)
- Traction system: Variable frequency (GTO)
- Acceleration: 3.3 km/(h⋅s) (2.1 mph/s)
- Deceleration: 4.0 km/(h⋅s) (2.5 mph/s) (emergency)
- Electric system(s): 600 V DC (third rail)
- Current collection: Contact shoe
- Bogies: Bolsterless
- Braking system(s): Brake-by-wire regenerative brakes
- Safety system(s): ATC-4 (CS-ATC), ATO
- Track gauge: 1,435 mm (4 ft 8 1/2 in)

The Nagoya Municipal Subway 2000 series (名古屋市交通局2000形) is a rapid transit electric multiple unit operated by the Transportation Bureau City of Nagoya on the Nagoya Subway Meijō Line and Meikō Line in Japan since 1989.

== Specifications ==
This model controls the amount of current applied to the motors with a variable frequency drive inverter. All units have also been retrofitted with Automatic train operation (ATO) concurrent with half-height platform screen door retrofits on the Meijō Line and Meikō Line.

== Formation ==
The trainsets are formed as follows.

Car No.	1	2	3	4	5	6
Designation	TC1	M1	M2	M2'	M1'	TC2
Numbering	2100	2200	2300	2400	2500	2600
Weight (t)	22.0	25.2	24.2	24.2	25.2	22.0
Capacity Total/seated	97/34	107/40	107/40	107/40	107/40	97/34
