= Hibino Station (Nagoya) =

Metro station in Nagoya, Japan

Coordinates: 35.1328°N 136.893°E

E02 Hibino Station 日比野駅
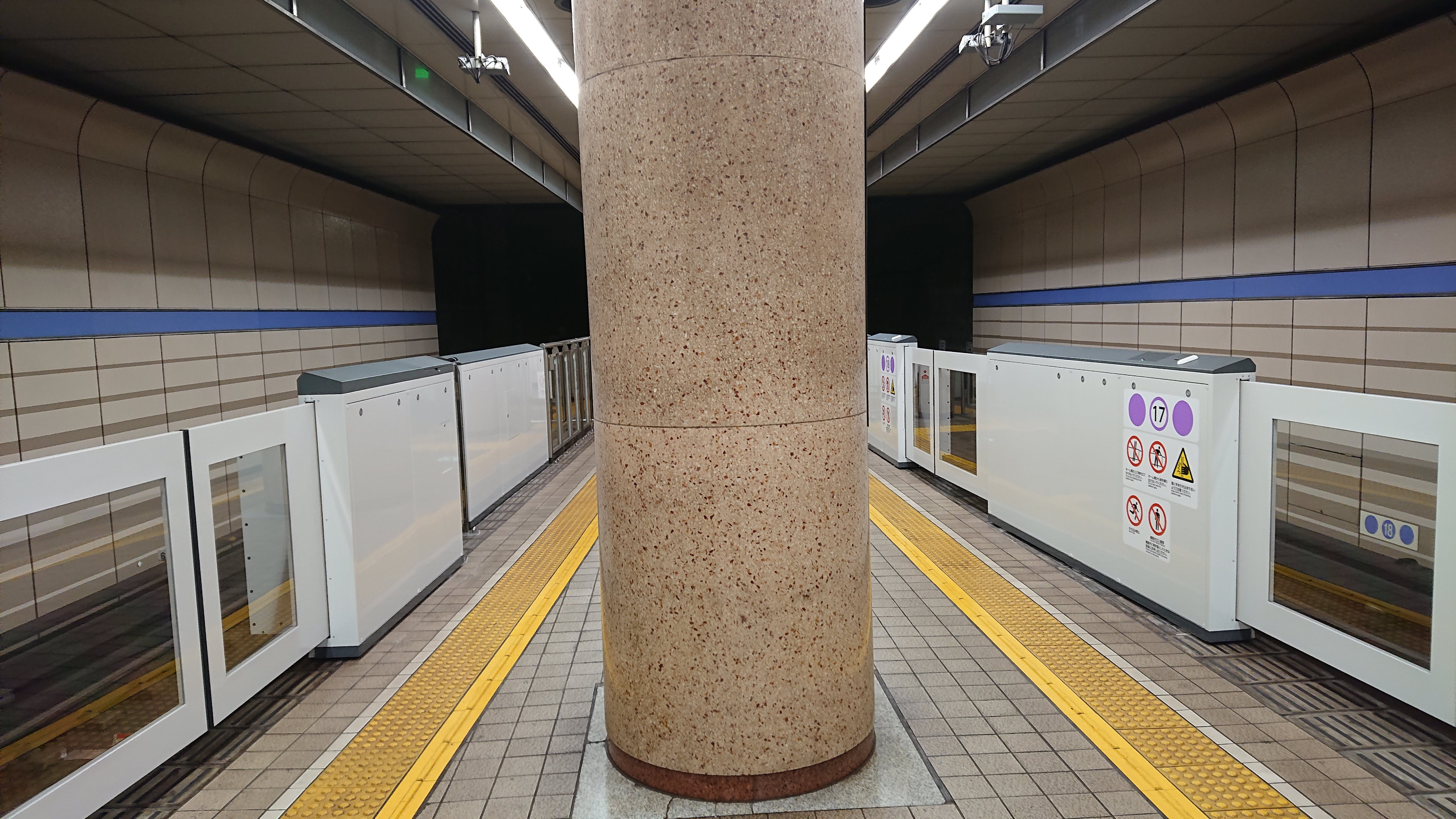
- Platforms

General information
- Location: Taihō 1-3-18, Atsuta, Nagoya, Aichi （名古屋市熱田区大宝一丁目3-18） Japan
- System: Nagoya Municipal Subway station
- Operator: Transportation Bureau City of Nagoya
- Line: Meikō Line
- Connections: Bus terminal

Other information
- Station code: E2

History
- Opened: 29 March 1971; 55 years ago

Passengers
- 2008: 3,017,778

Services
Preceding station	Nagoya Municipal Subway	Following station
Rokuban-chō E03 towards Nagoyakō	Meikō Line	Kanayama E01 Terminus
Location

Hibino Station (日比野駅, Hibino-eki) is an underground metro station located in Atsuta-ku, Nagoya, Aichi Prefecture, Japan operated by the Nagoya Municipal Subway's Meikō Line. It is located 1.5 kilometers from the terminus of the Meikō Line at Kanayama Station. This station provides access to Nagoya Congress Center.

== History ==
Hibino Station was opened on 29 March 1971.

== Lines ==
- Nagoya Municipal Subway
  - Meikō Line (Station E02)

== Layout ==
Hibino Station has a single underground island platform.

=== Platforms ===
1	■ Meikō Line	For Nagoyakō
2	■ Meikō Line	For Kanayama, Sakae, and Ōzone

The station has two tracks and, unusually for this line, one physical platform, which is divided into Platform 1 for Nagoyakō Station, and Platform 2 for Kanayama Station. There is one wicket, beyond which are five exits. On Platform 1 to Nagoya Port, train door 13 is closest to the elevator, doors 13 and 9 are closest to the escalators, and door 16 is closest to the stairs. On Platform 2, door 5 is closest to the elevator and escalator and door 2 is closest to the stairs. There are public phones near the elevators on the platforms, near the wicket, and near Exit 4. There is a handicapped-accessible bathroom with a baby changing area, and a second baby changing area, outside wicket. The station has coin lockers. There is a minor bus rotary outside the station.
