= Kanayama Station (Aichi) =

Railway and metro station in Nagoya, Japan

Kanayama Station 金山駅
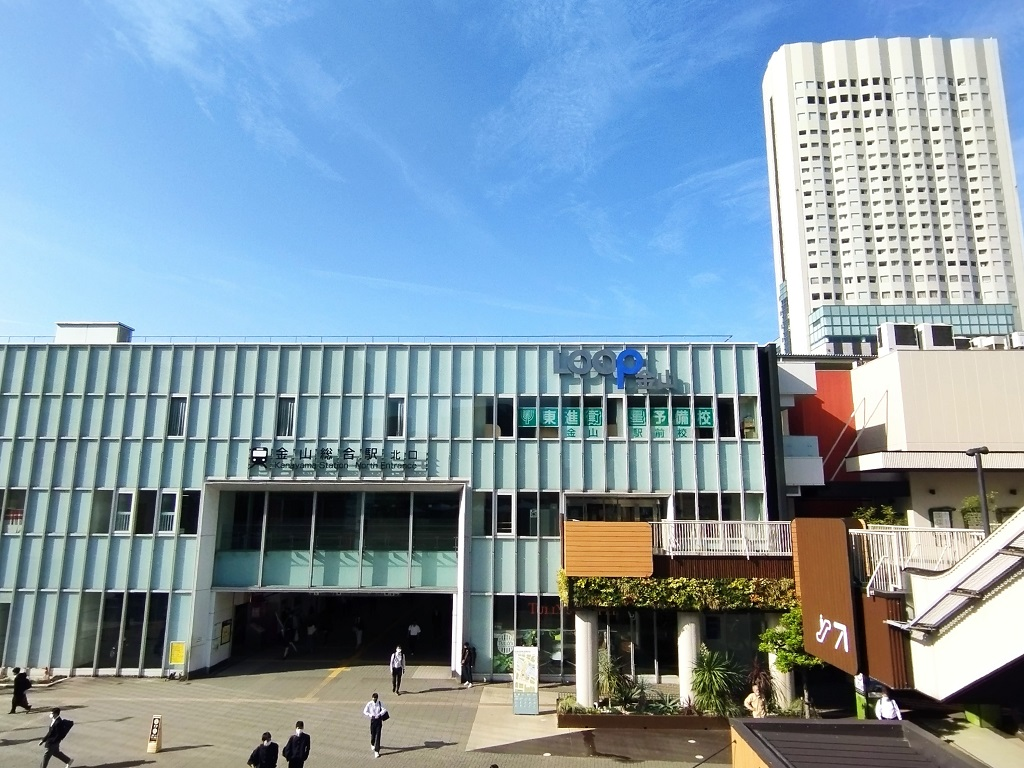

General information
- Location: Nagoya City, Aichi Prefecture; Japan
- Coordinates: 35.1432528°N 136.9009513°E
- Operator: JR Central; Meitetsu; Nagoya City Transportation Bureau
- Connections: Bus terminal

History
- Opened: 1944; 82 years ago
Location
- Location within Aichi Prefecture Location within Central Japan Location within Japan

Kanayama Station (金山駅, Kanayama-eki) is a railway station in Nagoya, Aichi Prefecture, Japan. The station is a concentrated terminal operated by Central Japan Railway Company (JR Central), Nagoya Railroad (Meitetsu), and Nagoya Municipal Subway, and is the main access terminal to Chūbu Centrair International Airport.

Kanayama Station 金山駅

General information
- Location: 1-1-18 Kanayama-cho, Atsuta-ku, Nagoya-shi, Aichi-ken; Japan
- System: Meitetsu station
- Operator: Meitetsu
- Line: ■ Meitetsu Nagoya Main Line
- Platforms: 2 island platforms
- Tracks: 4

Other information
- Station code: NH34

History
- Opened: 1 September 1944; 82 years ago
- Former names: Kanayamabashi (until 1989)

Passengers
- 2023–2024: 162,483 daily
Location

== Meitetsu Kanayama Station ==
Meitetsu Kanayama station is the oldest of the three stations that make up Kanayama Station, having been operating since 1 September 1944. Originally it was known as Kanayamabashi Station.

=== Layout ===
There are three wickets, namely the West Wicket, Central Wicket, and East Wicket. There is also a special wicket that allows transfers between JR and Meitetsu Lines.

Track diagram of Meitetsu Kanayama Station

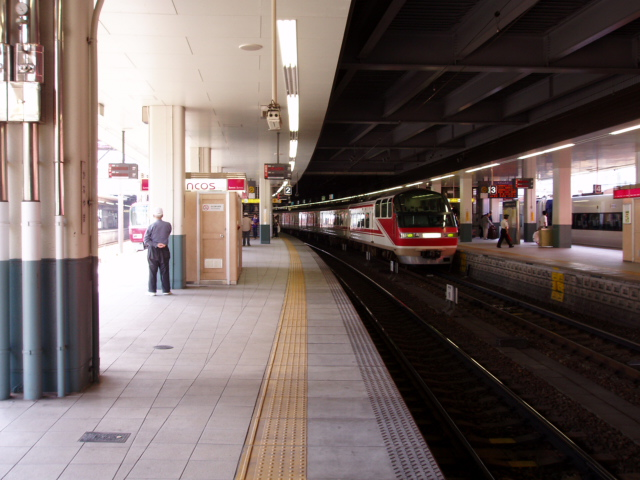
The Meitetsu platforms

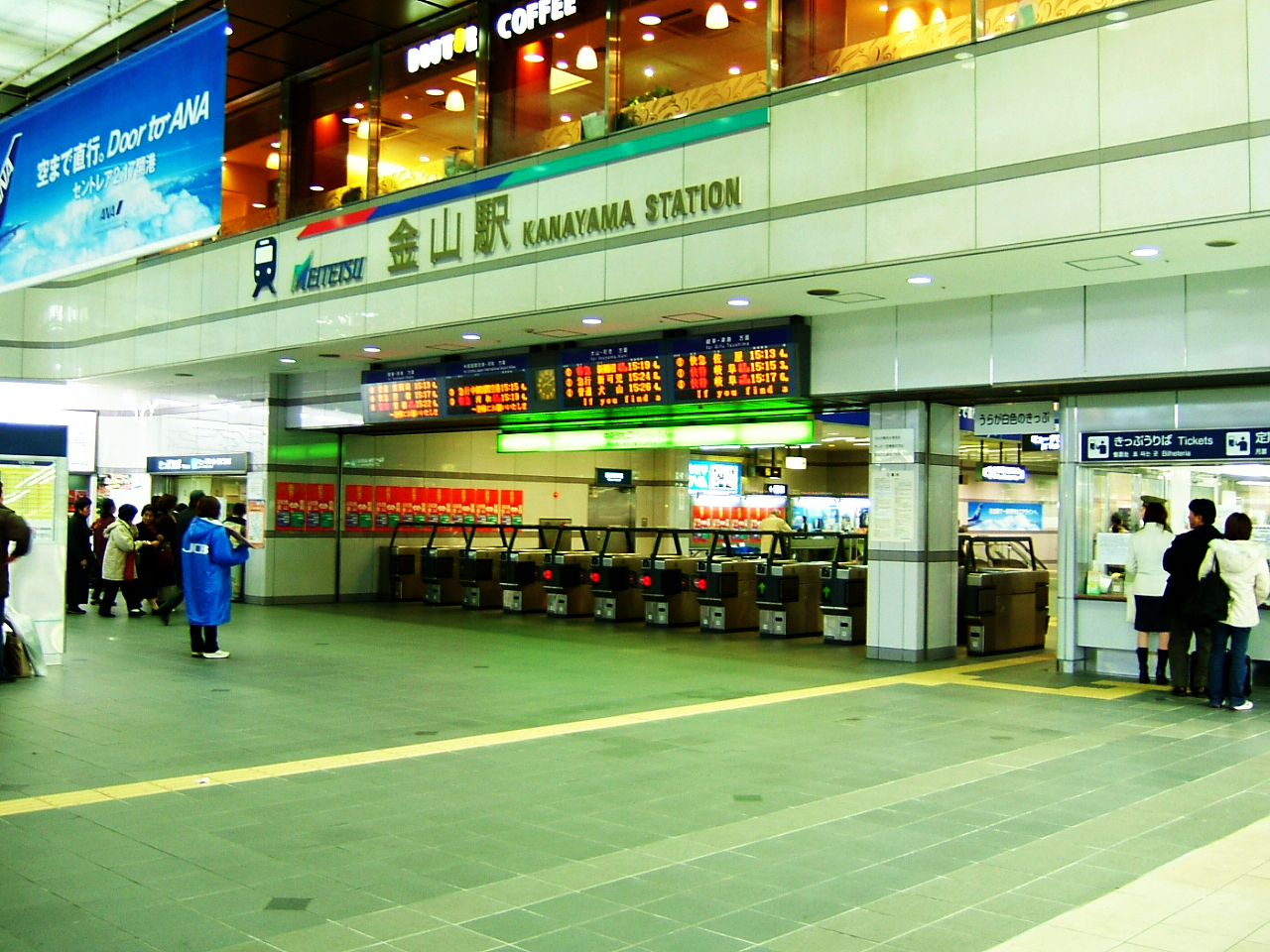
The Meitetsu ticket barriers

=== Platforms ===
There are two island platforms serving four tracks.

1, 2	■ Meitetsu Nagoya Main Line	for Meitetsu Nagoya, Meitetsu Ichinomiya, and Meitetsu Gifu
1, 2	■ Meitetsu Inuyama Line; Meitetsu Hiromi Line	for Iwakura, Inuyama, Shin Unuma, and Shin Kani
1, 2	■ Meitetsu Tsushima Line; Meitetsu Bisai Line	for Tsushima
3, 4	■ Meitetsu Nagoya Line; Meitetsu Toyokawa Line	for Narumi, Higashi Okazaki, and Toyohashi
3, 4	■ Meitetsu Nishio Line	for Nishio and Kira Yoshida
3, 4	■ Meitetsu Tokoname Line; Meitetsu Airport Line	for Ōtagawa and Central Japan International Airport
3, 4	■ Meitetsu Kowa Line; Meitetsu Chita New Line	for Kōwa, and Utsumi

== JR Central Kanayama Station ==
CA66 CF01 Kanayama Station 金山駅
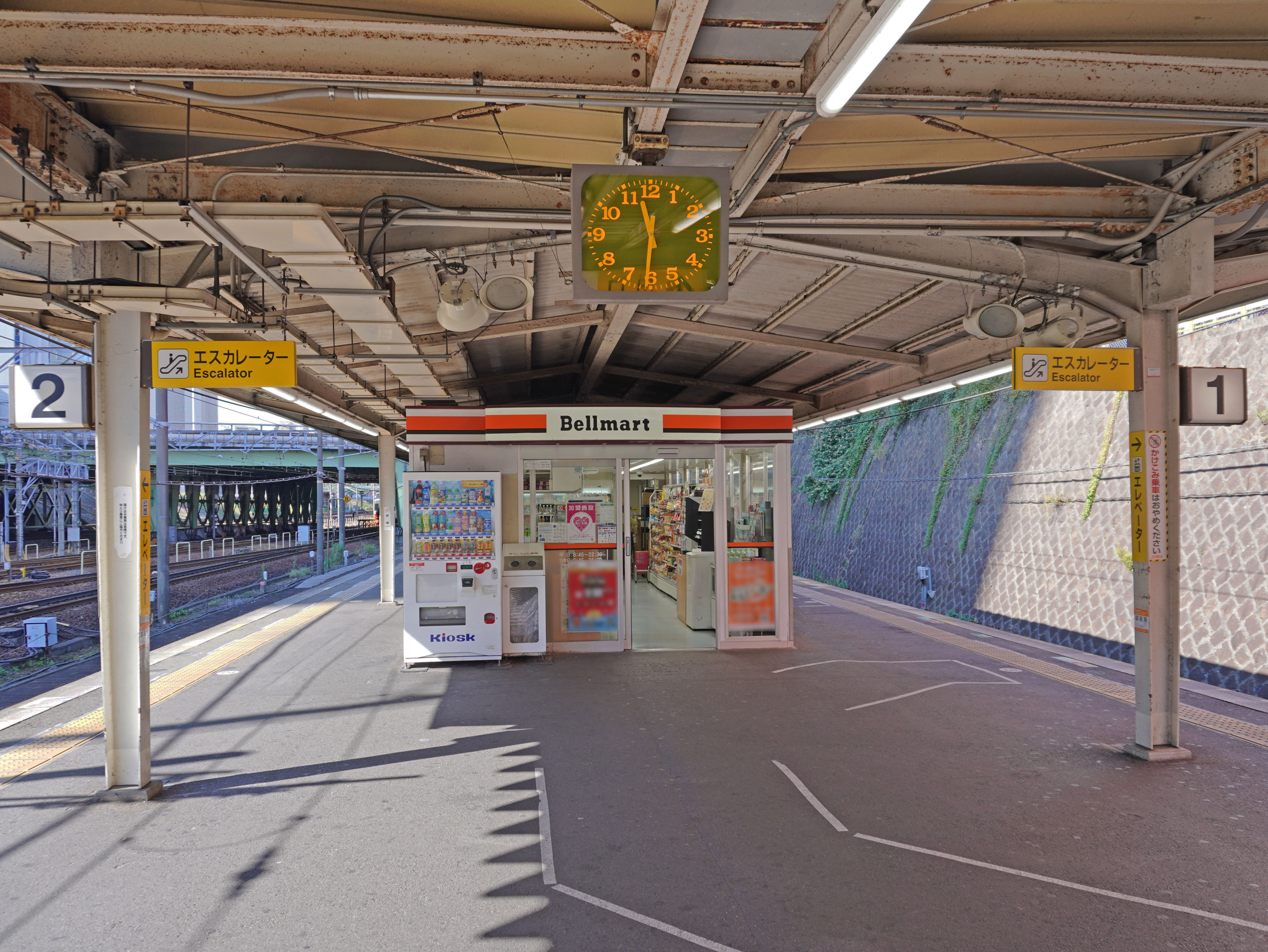
- Platforms 1 and 2

General information
- Location: 1-17-18 Kanayama, Naka Ward, Nagoya City, Aichi Prefecture; Japan
- Operator: JR Central
- Lines: Tōkaidō Main Line; Chūō Main Line
- Platforms: 2 island platforms
- Tracks: 4

Construction
- Structure type: Ground Level
- Accessible: Yes

Other information
- Station code: CA66; CF01

History
- Opened: 25 January 1962; 64 years ago

Passengers
- 2023–2024: 137,001 daily
Services
Preceding station	JR Central	Following station
Nagoya CA68 towards Maibara	Tōkaidō Main Line Special Rapid	Kariya CA58 towards Atami
Nagoya CA68 towards Maibara	Tōkaidō Main Line New Rapid Rapid Semi Rapid	Ōbu CA60 towards Atami
Otōbashi CA67 towards Maibara	Tōkaidō Main Line Local	Atsuta CA65 towards Atami
Nagoya CF00 Terminus	Chūō Main Line Home liner Shinano	Chikusa CF03 towards Shiojiri
Nagoya CF00 Terminus	Chūō Main Line Rapid Semi Rapid Local	Tsurumai CF02 towards Shiojiri
Location

JR Central Kanayama Station is one of the stations within Kanayama Station, and the second one to have been opened, on 25 January 1962, after Meitetsu Kanayama. It is a main stop on the Chūō Main Line and the Tōkaidō Main Line. On the Tōkaidō Main Line, there is a rapid train known as the Home Liner, and on the Chūō Main Line, there is a rapid train known as the Central Liner. There is a special wicket that allows passengers to transfer from JR lines to Meitetsu lines, which is possible because the Meitetsu tracks are within the JR tracks. There is also a staffed ticket office.

Station numbering was introduced to the sections of the Tōkaidō and Chuo Lines operated JR Central in March 2018; Kanayama Station was assigned station number CA66 for the Tōkaidō Line and CF01 for the Chuo Line.

=== Lines ===
- Tōkaidō Main Line
  - for Nagoya, Gifu, and Ōgaki
  - for Ōbu, Kariya, Okazaki, Gamagōri, Toyohashi, and Hamamatsu
- Chūō Main Line
  - for Nagoya
  - for Kōzōji, Tajimi, and Nakatsugawa

=== Layout ===
==== Platforms ====
1	■ Chūō Main Line	for Kōzōji, Tajimi, Mizunami and Nakatsugawa
2	■ Chūō Main Line	for Nagoya
3	■ Tōkaidō Main Line	for Kariya, Okazaki and Toyohashi
4	■ Tōkaidō Main Line	for Owari-Ichinomiya and Gifu

There are two physical platforms for four lines. The two physical platforms straddle the platforms of Meitetsu Kanayama, which are sandwiched in the middle. Platforms 1 and 2 are for the Chūō Line, with Platform 1 serving trains bound for Tajimi Station and Platform 2 serving trains bound for Nagoya Station. Platforms 3 and 4 are for the Tōkaidō Line, with Platform 3 serving trains bound for Toyohashi Station and Platform 4 serving trains bound for Nagoya Station.

The station is completely accessible inside the gates for passengers with disabilities.

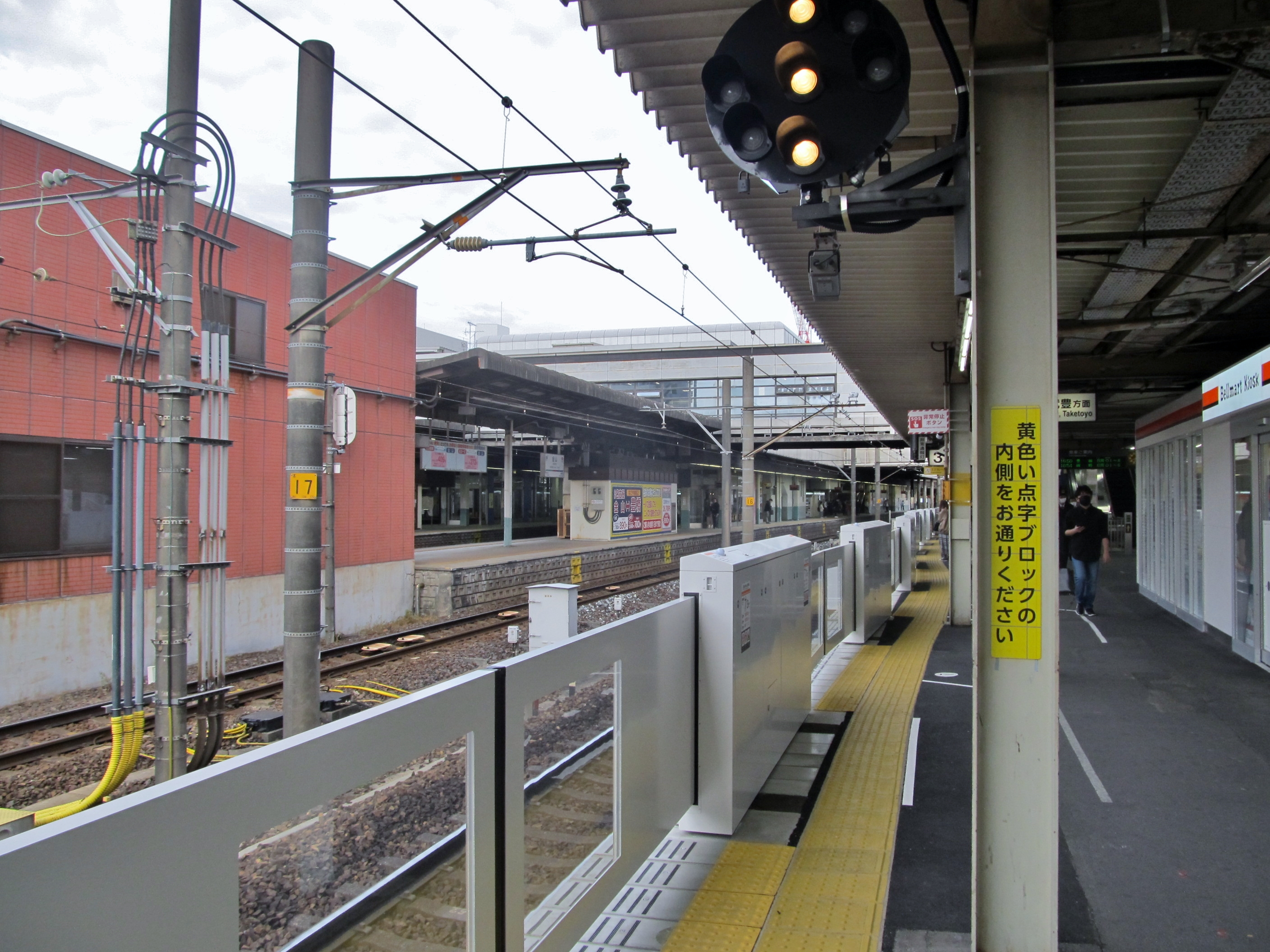
Platform 3 in Tōkaidō Main Line

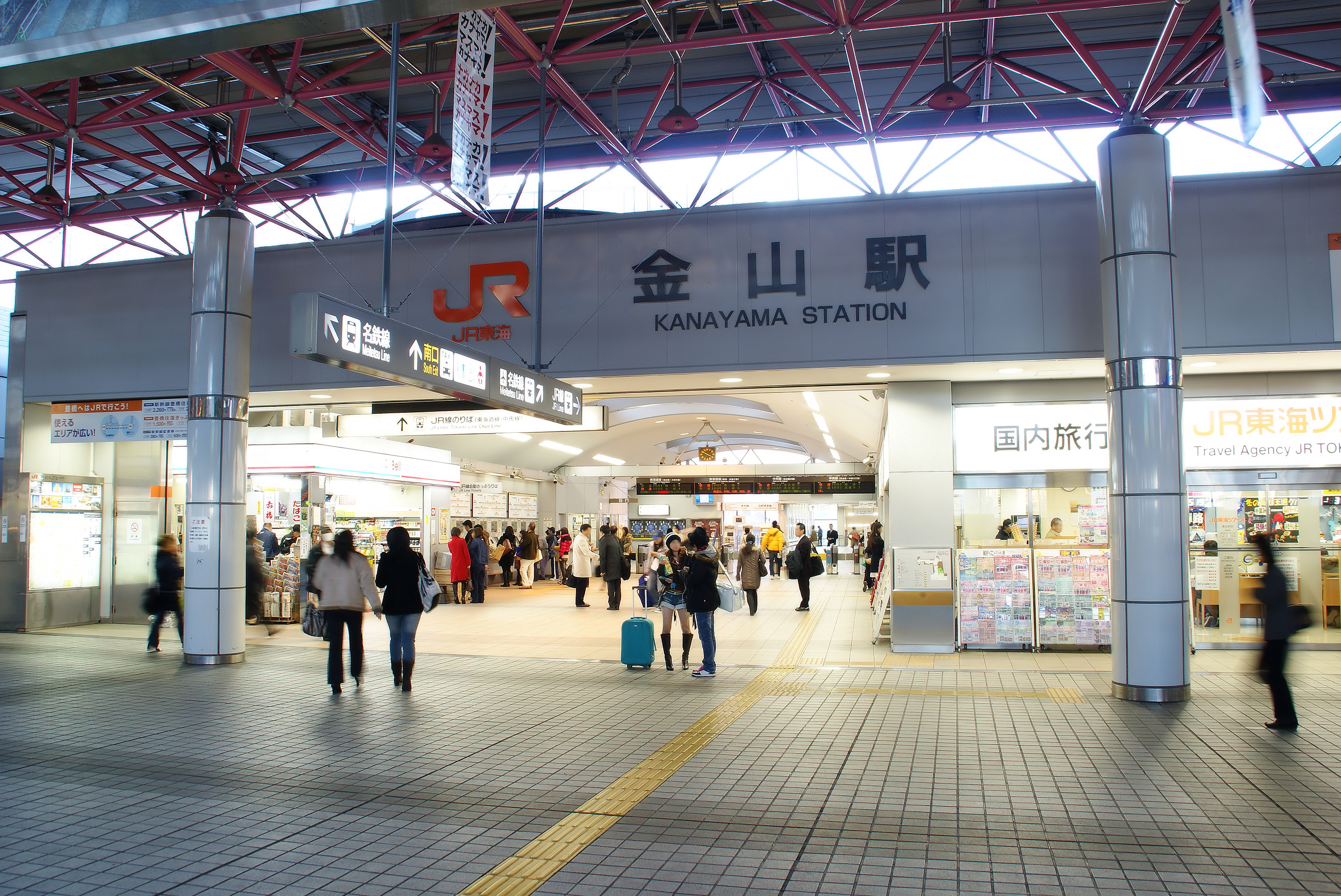
The JR Central ticket barriers

== Nagoya Municipal Subway Kanayama Station ==
M01 E01 Kanayama Station 金山駅
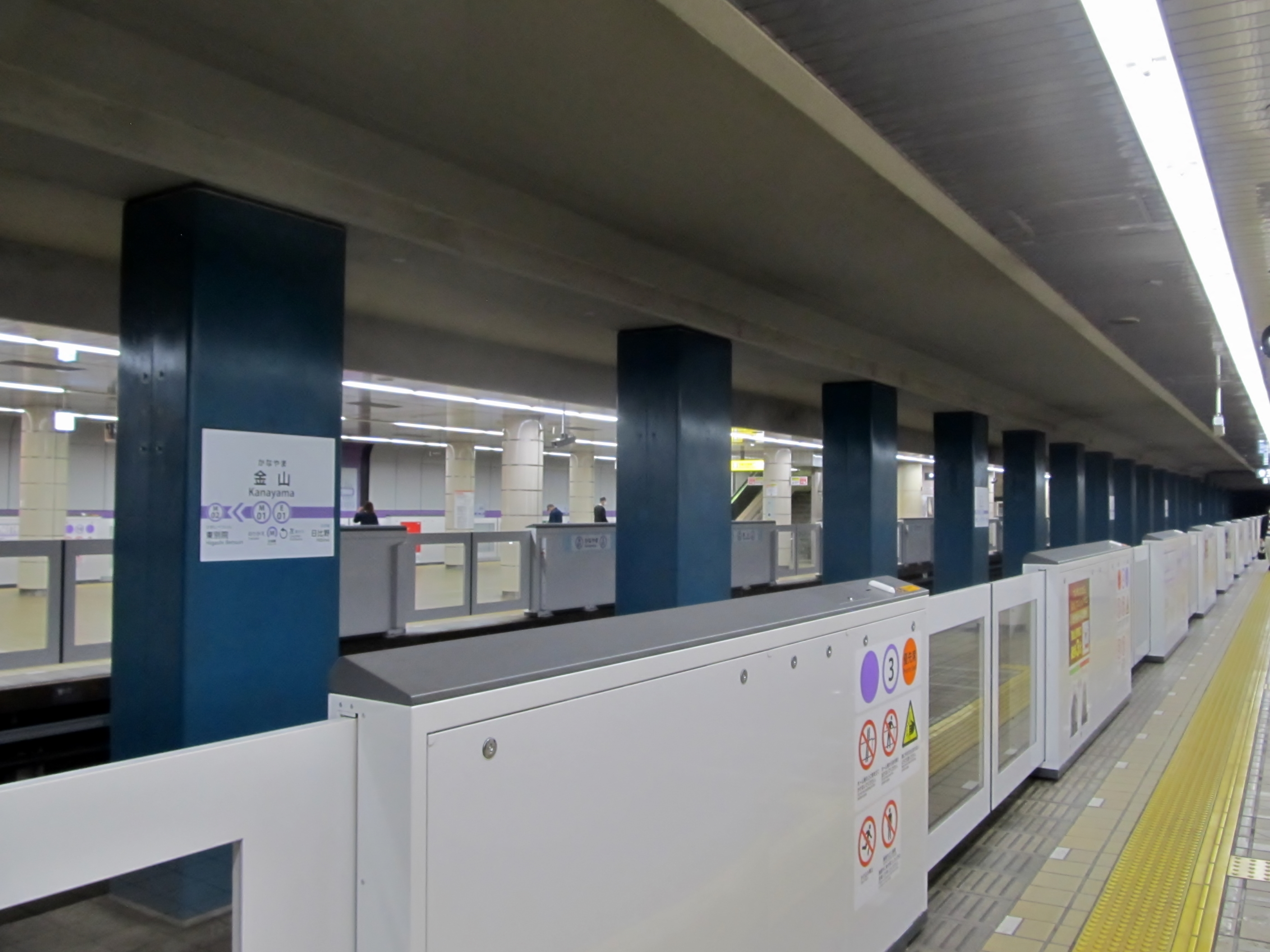
- Station platforms

General information
- Location: 1-13-11 Kanayama, Naka Ward, Nagoya City, Aichi Prefecture; Japan
- System: Nagoya Municipal Subway station
- Operator: Nagoya City Transportation Bureau
- Lines: Meijō Line; Meikō Line

Other information
- Station code: M01; E01

History
- Opened: 30 March 1967; 59 years ago

Passengers
- 2023–2024: 151,460 daily

Services
Preceding station	Nagoya Municipal Subway	Following station
Nishi Takakura M28 anticlockwise	Meijō Line	Higashi Betsuin M02 clockwise
Hibino E02 towards Nagoyakō	Meikō Line	Terminus
Location

The subway portion of Kanayama Station opened on 30 March 1967 as a stop on the Meijō Line and Meikō Line.

=== Lines ===
- Meijō Line (Station Number: M01)
  - for Sakae and Ōzone
  - for Aratama-bashi and Nagoya Daigaku (Nagoya University)
- Meikō Line (Station Number: E01)
  - for Nagoyakō (Nagoya Port)

=== Layout ===
==== Platforms ====
1	■ Meijō Line	for Aratama-bashi, Yagoto, and Motoyama
2	■ Meikō Line	for Tōkai-dōri and Nagoyakō
3	■ Meijō Line	from Nagoyako for Kamimaezu, Sakae, and Ōzone
4	■ Meijō Line	from Aratama-bashi for Kamimaezu, Sakae, and Ōzone

There are four platforms. Platforms 3 and 4, on one physical platform, both serve trains bound for Sakae Station and Ōzone Station. The other physical platform has trains bound for Nagoyakō Station on Platform 2 and trains bound for Aratama-bashi Station on Platform 1.

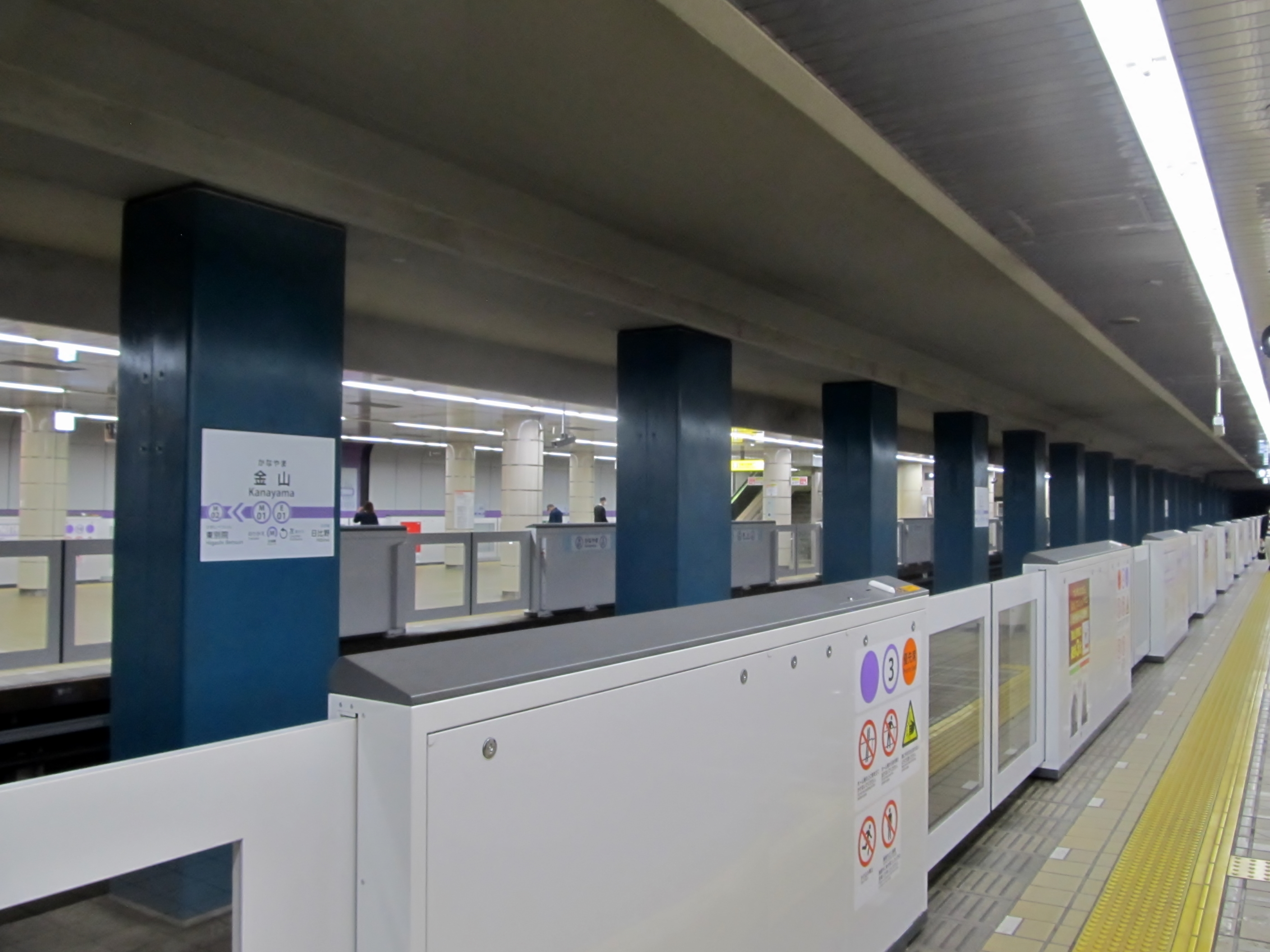
Platforms

== See also ==
- List of railway stations in Japan
