= Nagoyakō Station =

Metro station in Nagoya, Japan

Coordinates: 35.0931°N 136.882°E

E07 Nagoyakō Station 名古屋港駅
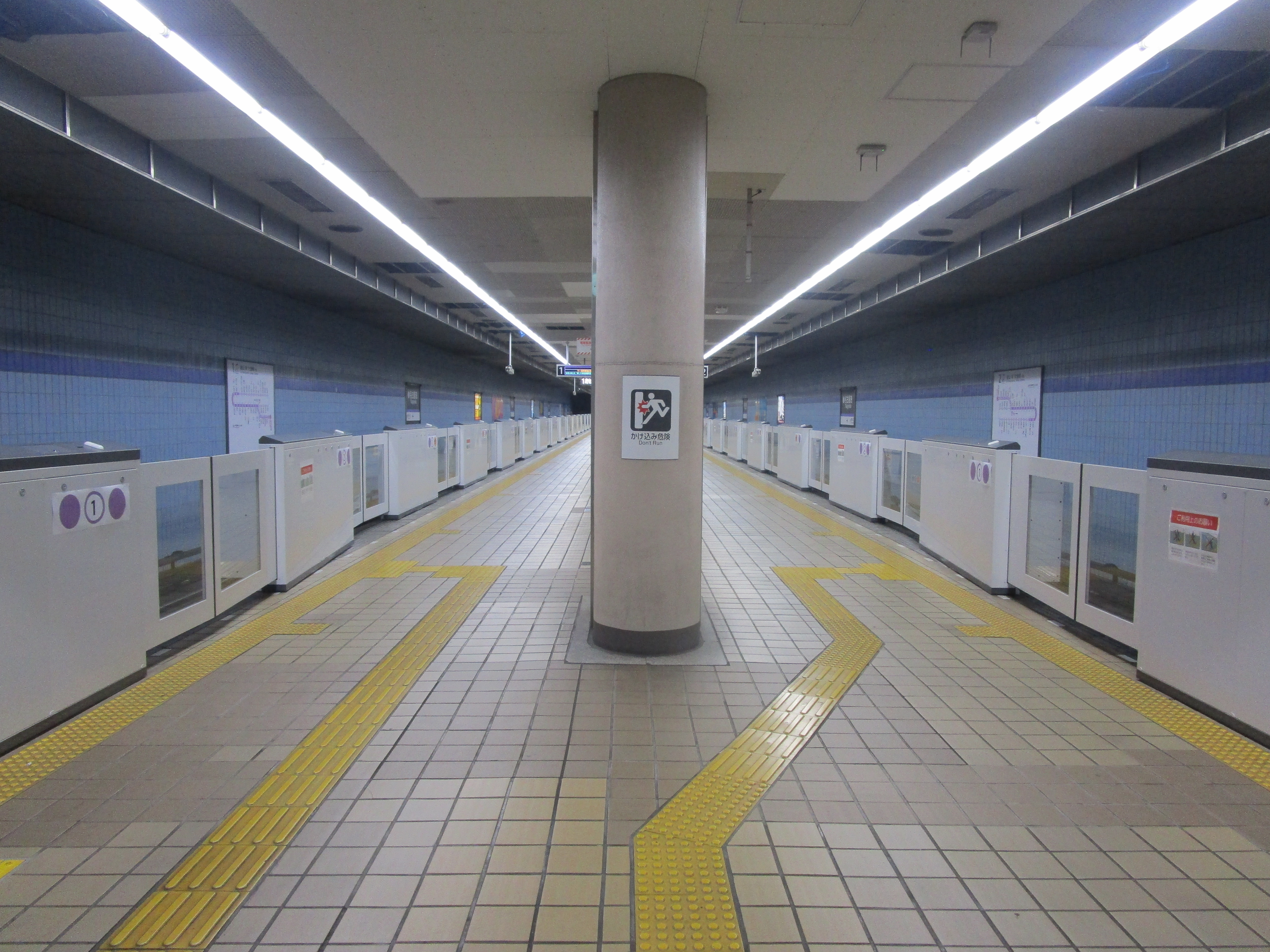
- Platforms

General information
- Location: 1-8-23 Irifune, Minato, Nagoya, Aichi （名古屋市港区入船一丁目8-23） Japan
- System: Nagoya Municipal Subway station
- Operator: Transportation Bureau City of Nagoya
- Line: Meikō Line
- Connections: Bus terminal

Other information
- Station code: E07

History
- Opened: 29 March 1971; 55 years ago

Passengers
- 2008: 1,852,687

Services
Preceding station	Nagoya Municipal Subway	Following station
Terminus	Meikō Line	Tsukiji-guchi E06 towards Kanayama
Location

Nagoyakō Station (名古屋港駅, Nagoyakō-eki) is an underground metro station located in Minato-ku, Nagoya, Aichi, Japan operated by the Nagoya Municipal Subway’s Meikō Line. It is currently a terminal station on the line, and is located 6.0 kilometers from the opposing terminus of the Meikō Line at Kanayama Station. This station provides access to the Port of Nagoya Public Aquarium and Nagoya Port.

== History ==
Nagoyakō Station was opened on 29 March 1971.

== Lines ==
- Nagoya Municipal Subway
  - Meikō Line (Station E07)

== Station layout ==
Nagoyakō Station has a single underground island platform.

=== Platforms ===
1	■ Meikō Line	for Kanayama, Sakae, and Ōzone
2	■ Meikō Line	for Kanayama, Sakae, and Ōzone

There are three exits: Exit 1 and Exit 2 on the South Exit facing the port, and Exit 3 on the North Exit facing the Meikō Line. Correspondingly, there are also two rows of gates. The North Exit has bathrooms, a telephone, and down escalator. The South Exit has an up escalator, lockers, and an elevator. Exit 2 of the North Exit provides closest access to the bus rotary.
