= Kurokawa Station (Nagoya) =

Metro station in Nagoya, Japan

Coordinates: 35.1972°N 136.91°E

M09 Kurokawa Station 黒川駅
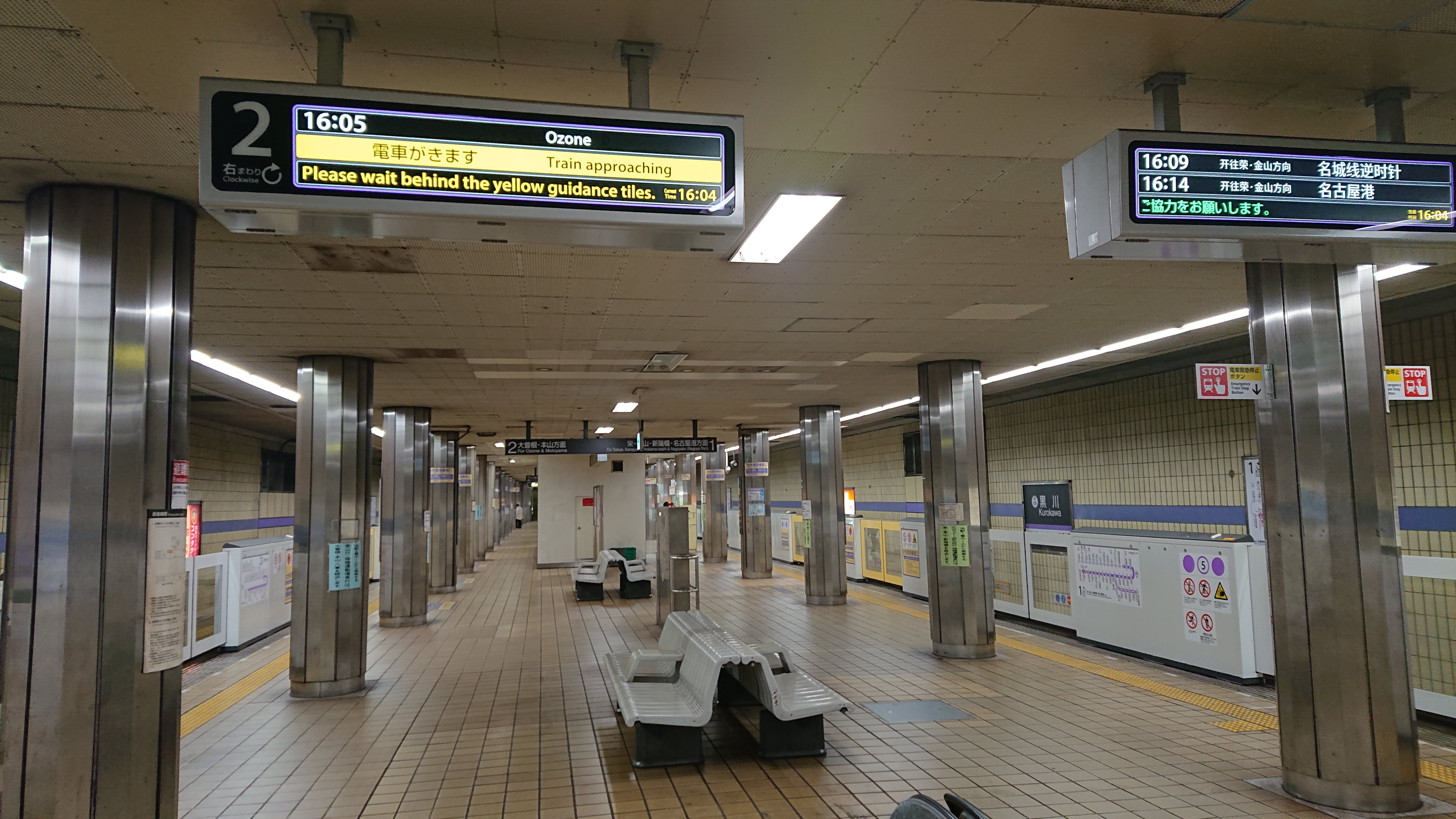

General information
- Location: Shiromitōri 3-13, Kita, Nagoya, Aichi （名古屋市北区城見通三丁目13） Japan
- System: Nagoya Municipal Subway station
- Operator: Transportation Bureau City of Nagoya
- Line: Meijō Line
- Connections: Bus terminal

Other information
- Station code: M09

History
- Opened: 20 December 1971; 54 years ago

Passengers
- 2007: 13,324 daily

Services
Preceding station	Nagoya Municipal Subway	Following station
Meijō Kōen M08 anticlockwise	Meijō Line	Shiga-hondōri M10 clockwise
Location

Kurokawa Station (黒川駅, Kurokawa-eki) is a railway station in Kita-ku, Nagoya, Aichi Prefecture, Japan.

It was opened on 20 December 1971; 54 years ago.

== Lines ==
- Nagoya Municipal Subway
  - Meijō Line (Station number: M09)

== Layout ==
=== Platforms ===
1	■ Meijō Line	For Sakae, Kanayama, Aratama-bashi, and Nagoyakō
2	■ Meijō Line	For Ōzone and Motoyama

=== Car Placement ===
(map to come)

=== Internal Station Map ===
(map to come)
Blue denotes upward moving escalators.
Pink denotes downward moving escalators.

=== External Exit Placement ===
(map to come)

== Disabled or Injured Route Information ==
There is an elevator from the platform to the west wicket (exit 2 & 3). To the left of the wicket is an elevator to the ground floor.
There are both stairs and upward moving escalators at both the east and west wickets.
All exits are stairs.

== See also ==
- Media related to Kurokawa Station (Aichi) at Wikimedia Commons
