= Meijō Kōen Station =

Metro station in Nagoya, Japan

Coordinates: 35.1906°N 136.9047°E

M08 Meijō Kōen Station 名城公園駅
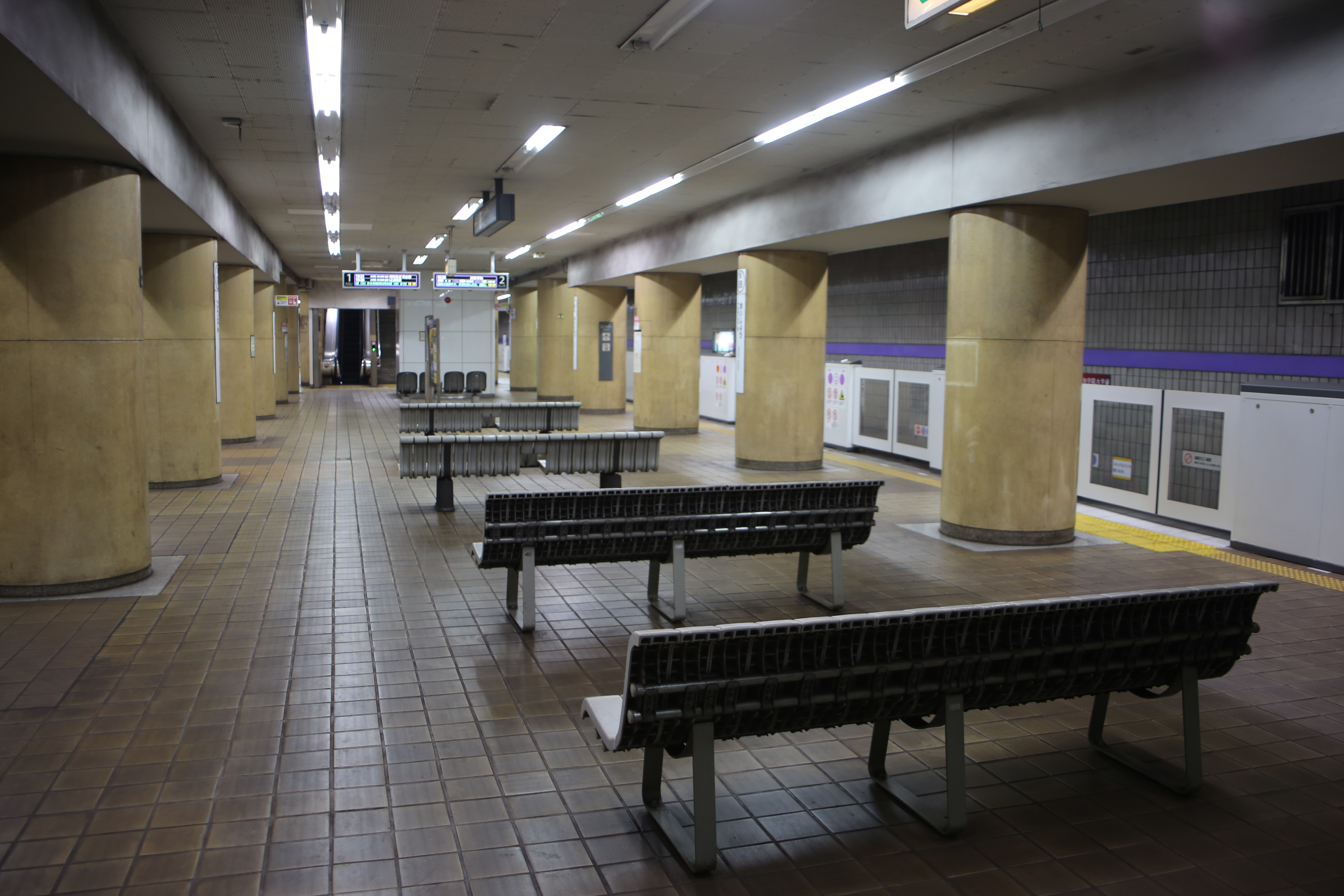

General information
- Location: Meijō 2-1-26, Kita, Nagoya, Aichi （名古屋市北区名城二丁目1-26） Japan
- System: Nagoya Municipal Subway station
- Operator: Transportation Bureau City of Nagoya
- Line: Meijō Line
- Connections: Bus stop

Other information
- Station code: M08

History
- Opened: 20 December 1971; 54 years ago

Passengers
- 2007: 4,513 daily

Services
| Preceding station | Nagoya Municipal Subway | Following station |
|---|---|---|
| Nagoyajo M07 anticlockwise | Meijō Line | Kurokawa M09 clockwise |
Location

Meijō Kōen Station (名城公園駅, Meijō Kōen-eki) is a railway station in Kita-ku, Nagoya, Aichi Prefecture, Japan.

This station provides access to Meijō Park. It was also used as a drop-off point by mistake by some visitors heading to Nagoya Castle, as its name contained the kanji character for the castle. This led to the Nagoya city government renaming Shiyakusho Station into Nagoyajo Station in 2023.

It was opened on 20 December 1971; 54 years ago.

== Lines ==
- Nagoya Municipal Subway
  - Meijō Line (Station number: M08)

== Layout ==
=== Platforms ===
| 1 | ■ Meijō Line | For Sakae, Kanayama, Aratama-bashi, and Nagoyakō |
| 2 | ■ Meijō Line | For Ōzone and Motoyama |
