= Kita-ku, Nagoya =

Kita 北区
- Ward
- Kita Ward
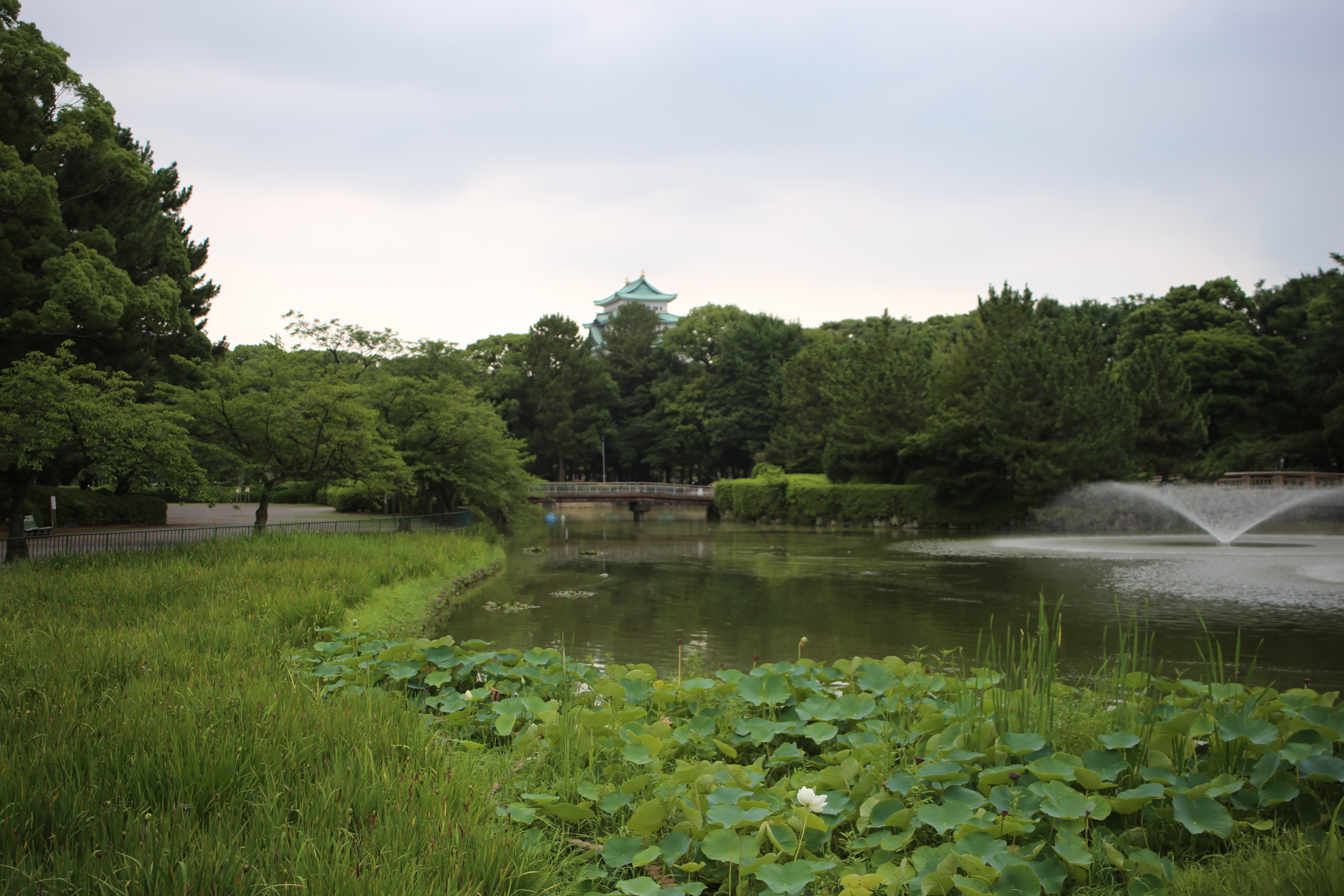
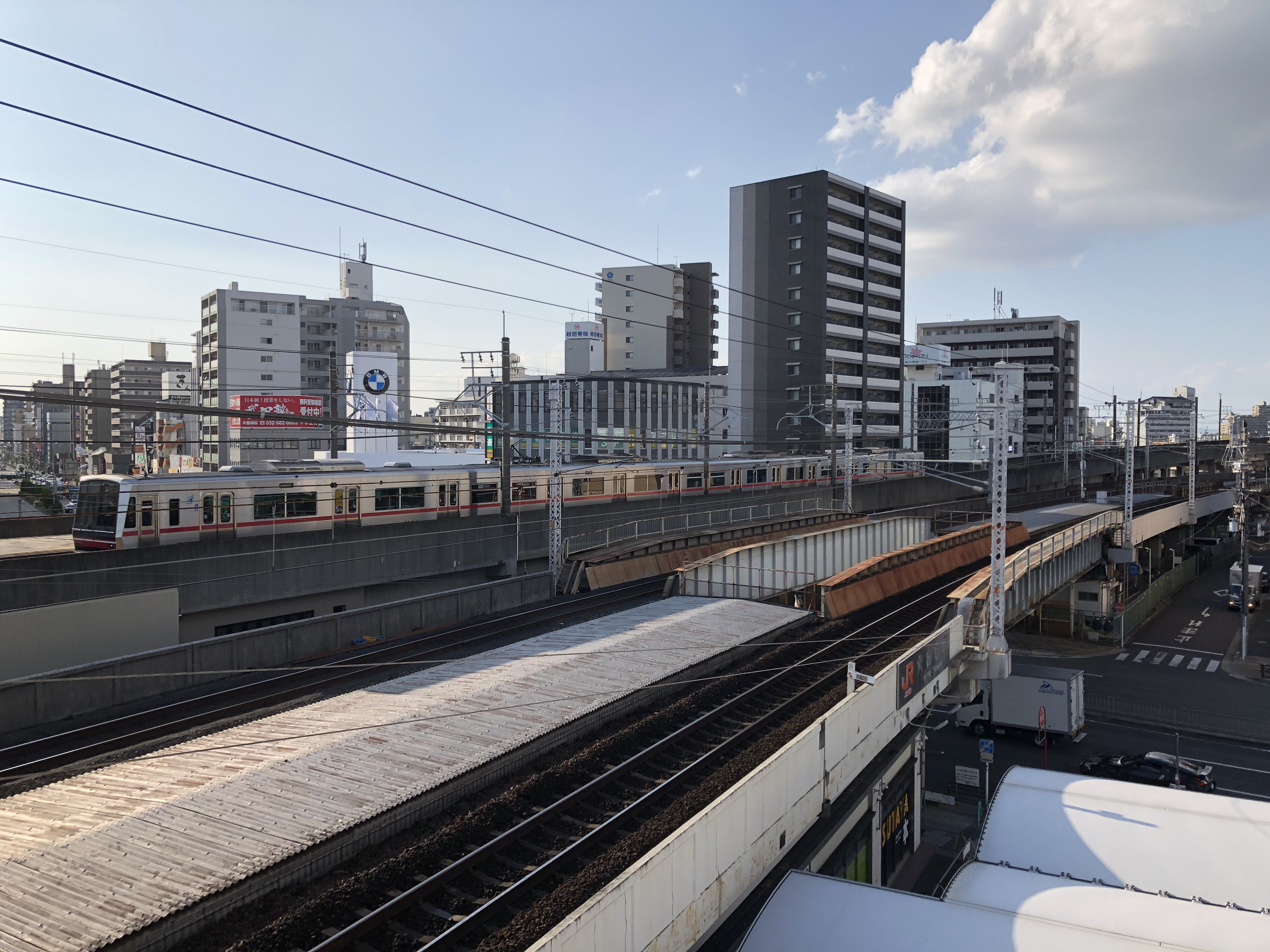
- Meijō Park; Ōzone

- Flag Seal

- Location of Kita-ku in Nagoya

- Coordinates: 35°11′39″N 136°54′42″E
- Country: Japan
- Region: Chūbu region Tōkai region
- Prefecture: Aichi

Area
  - Total: 17.53 km^{2} (6.77 sq mi)

Population (October 1, 2019)
  - Total: 163,555
  - Density: 9,330/km^{2} (24,160/sq mi)
- Time zone: UTC+9 (Japan Standard Time)
- Tree: Sakura
- Flower: Cosmos (flower)
- Phone number: 052-911-3131
- Address: 17-1, Shimizu 4-chome, Kita-ku, Nagoya-shi, Aichi-ken 462-8511
- Website: www.city.nagoya.jp/kita/ (in Japanese)

Kita Ward (北区, Kita-ku) is one of the 16 wards of the city of Nagoya in Aichi Prefecture, Japan. As of 1 October 2019, the ward had an estimated population of 163,555 and a population density of 9,330 persons per km^{2}. The total area was 17.53 km^{2}.

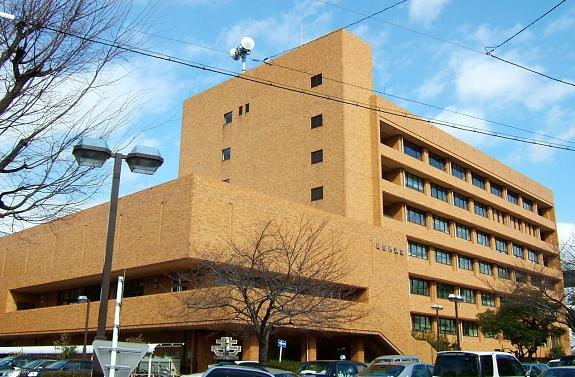
Kita-ku Ward Office

== Geography ==
Kita Ward is the north of the center of the city of Nagoya.

=== Surrounding municipalities ===
- Nishi Ward
- Moriyama Ward
- Naka Ward
- Higashi Ward
- Kasugai
- Kitanagoya
- Toyoyama

== History ==
Kita Ward was founded in 1944. Its area was expanded in 1946 with an addition from Higashi-ku and again in 1951 with an addition from Naka-ku. In 1955, the village of Kusunoki, formerly part of Nishikasugai District was annexed by Nagoya city, and joined to Kita Ward.

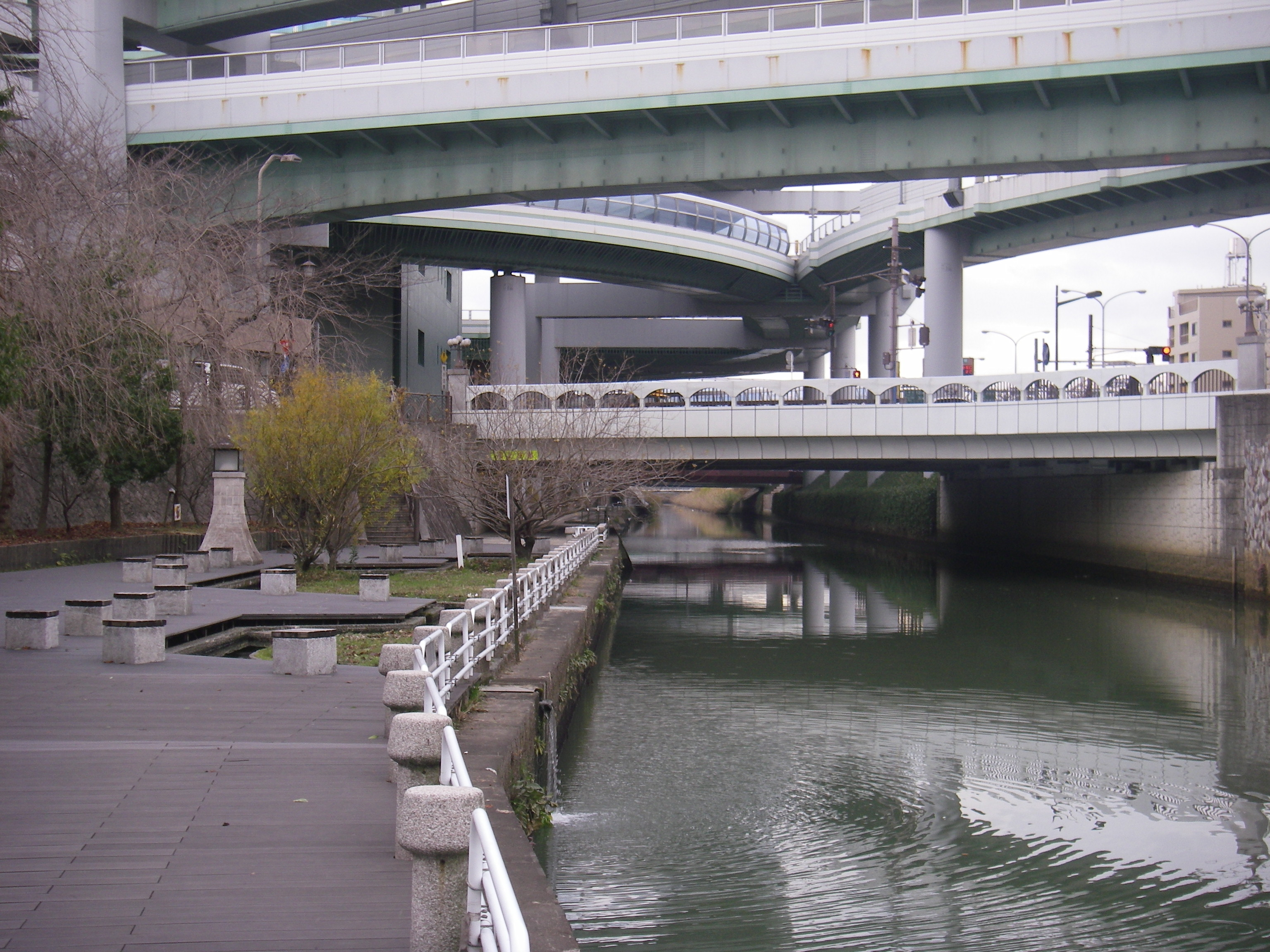
Hori River

== Economy ==
Kita Ward is largely a regional commercial center and bedroom community for central Nagoya.

Ōzone Sub CBD

- Mets Ōzone (Higashi-ku)
- Mitsubishi Electric Corporation Nagoya Factory (Higashi-ku)
- OZ Garden
- OZ Mall
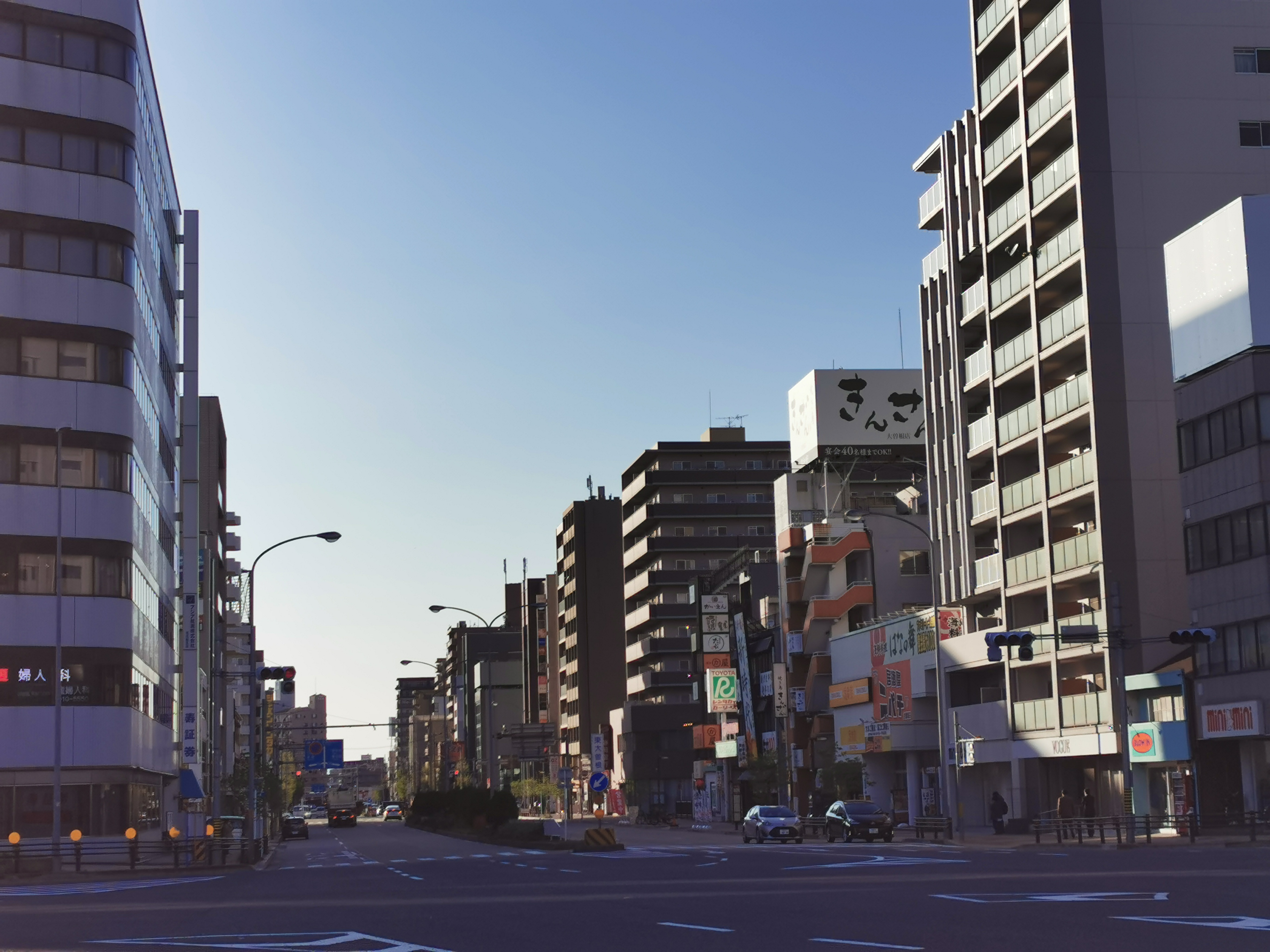
Ōzone

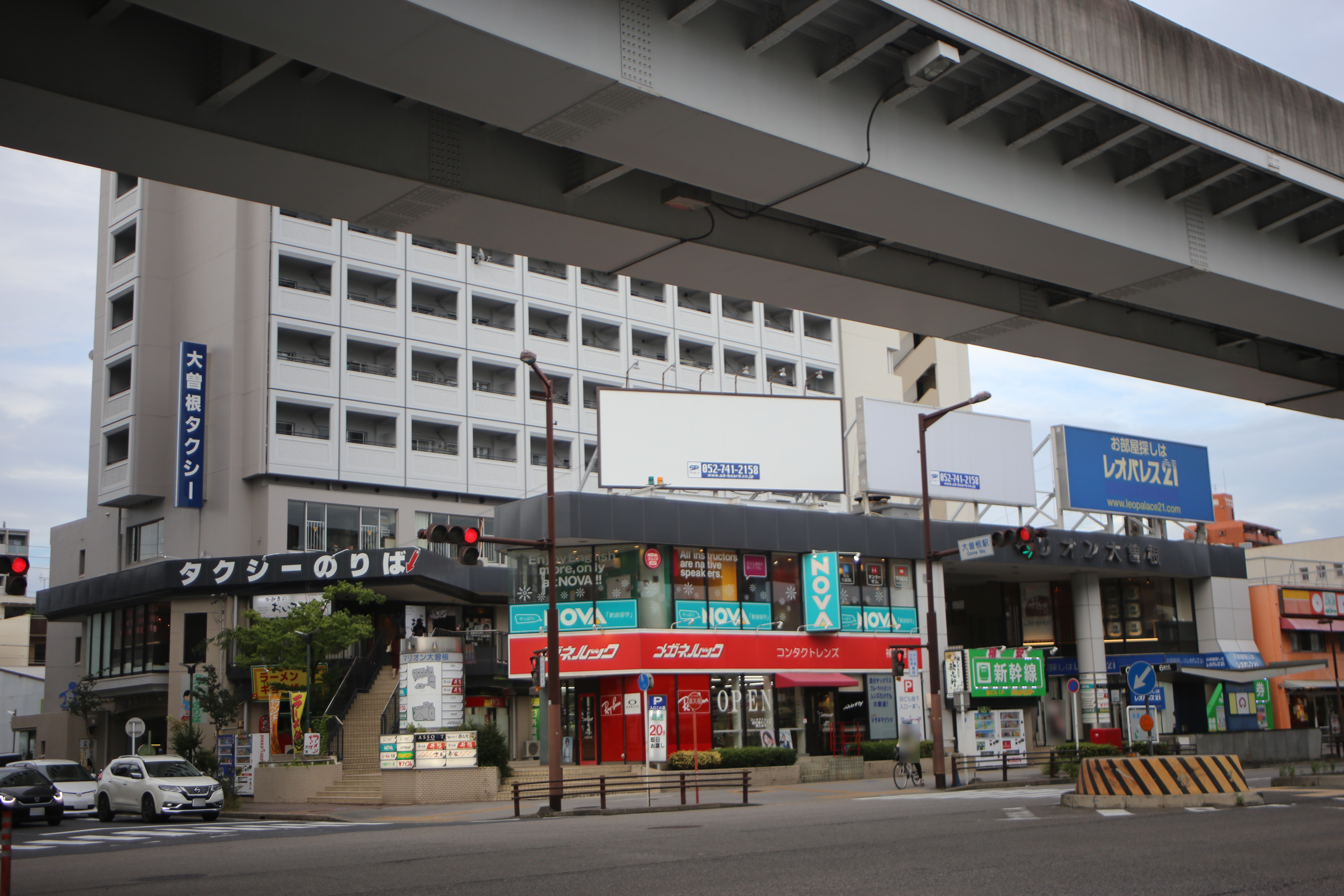
Marion Ōzone

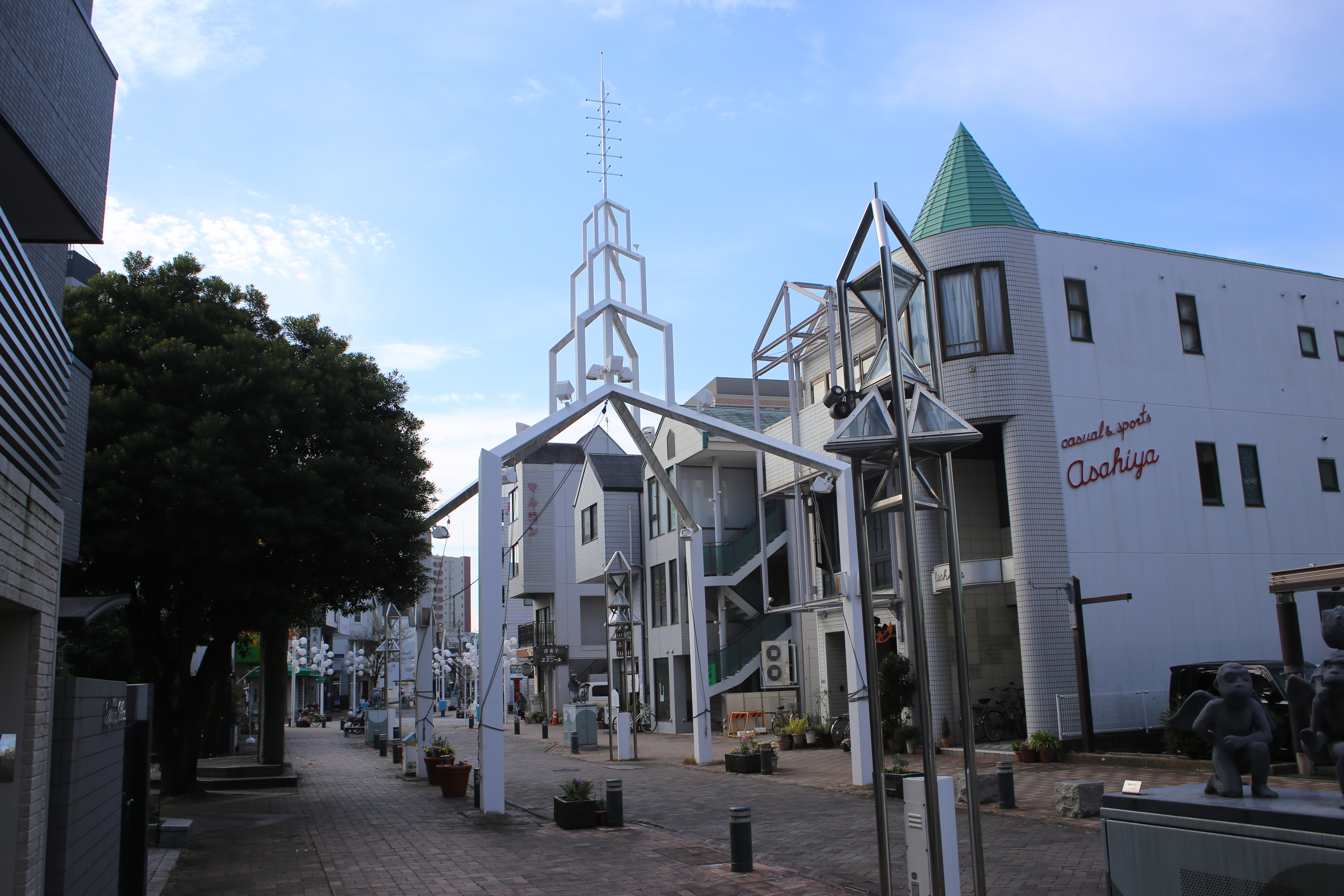
OZ Mall

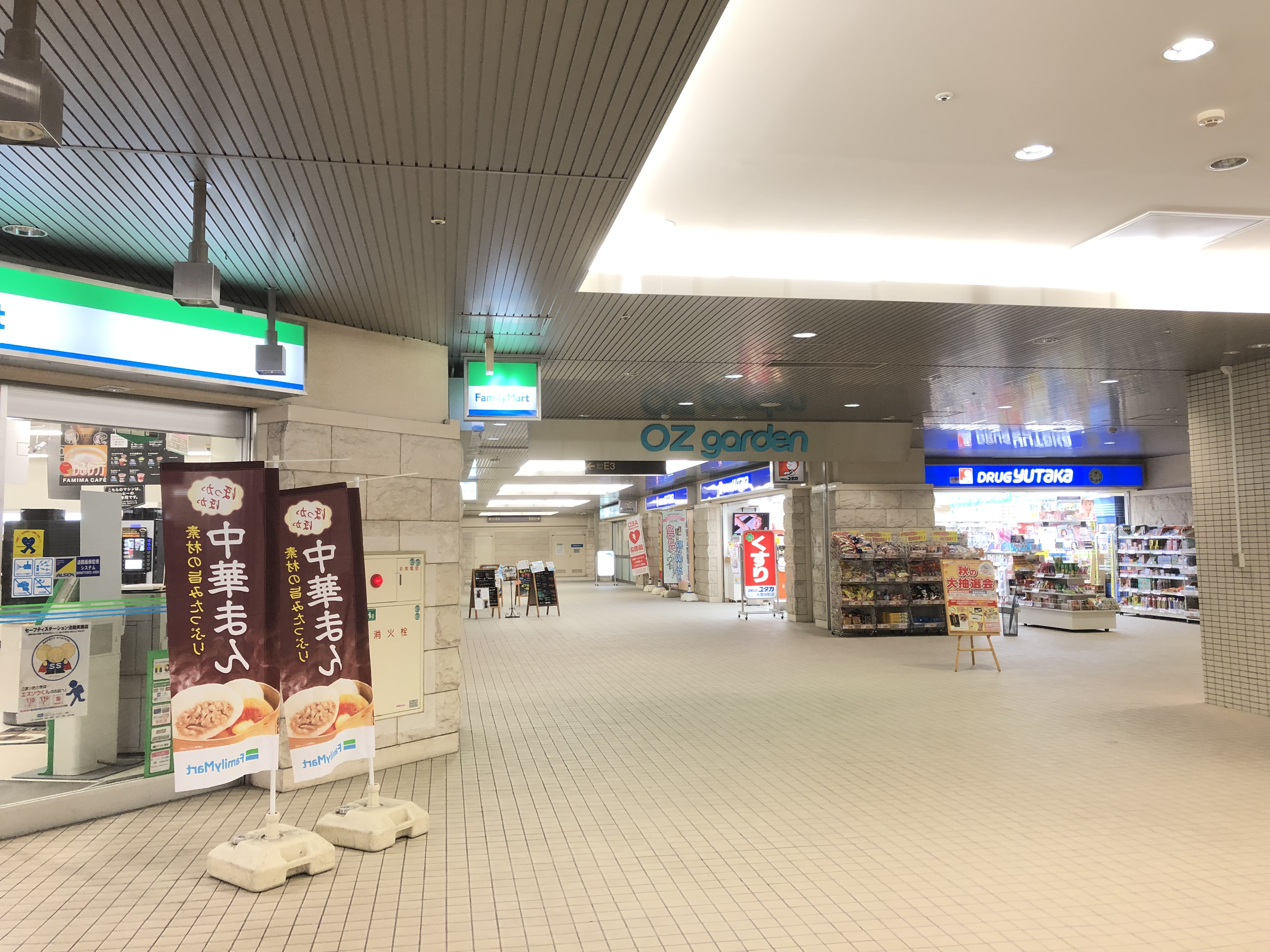
OZ Garden

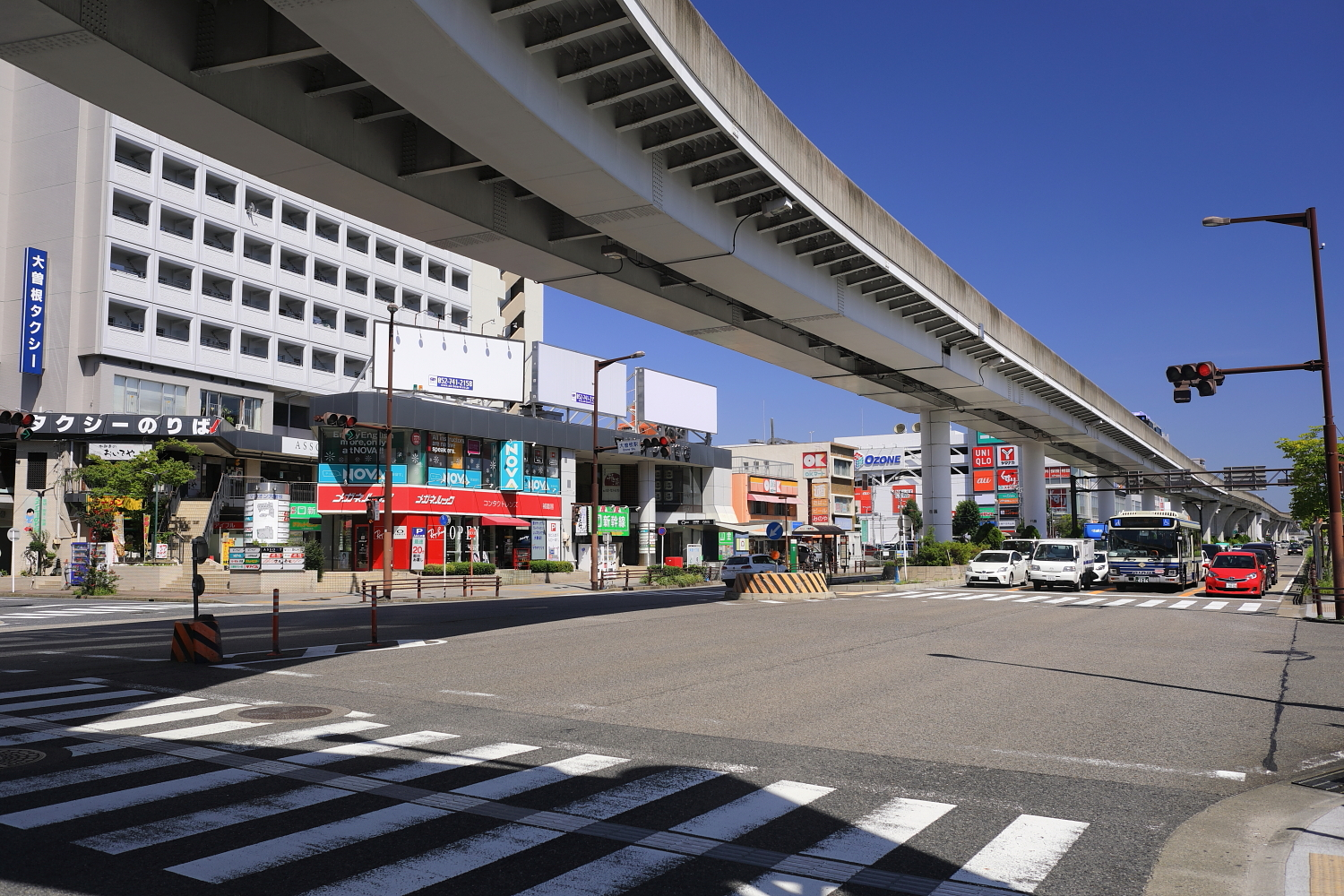
Ōzone Station Intersection

== Education ==
=== University ===
- Aichi Gakuin University
- Nagoya Sangyo University Satellite campus
- Nagoya Zokei University
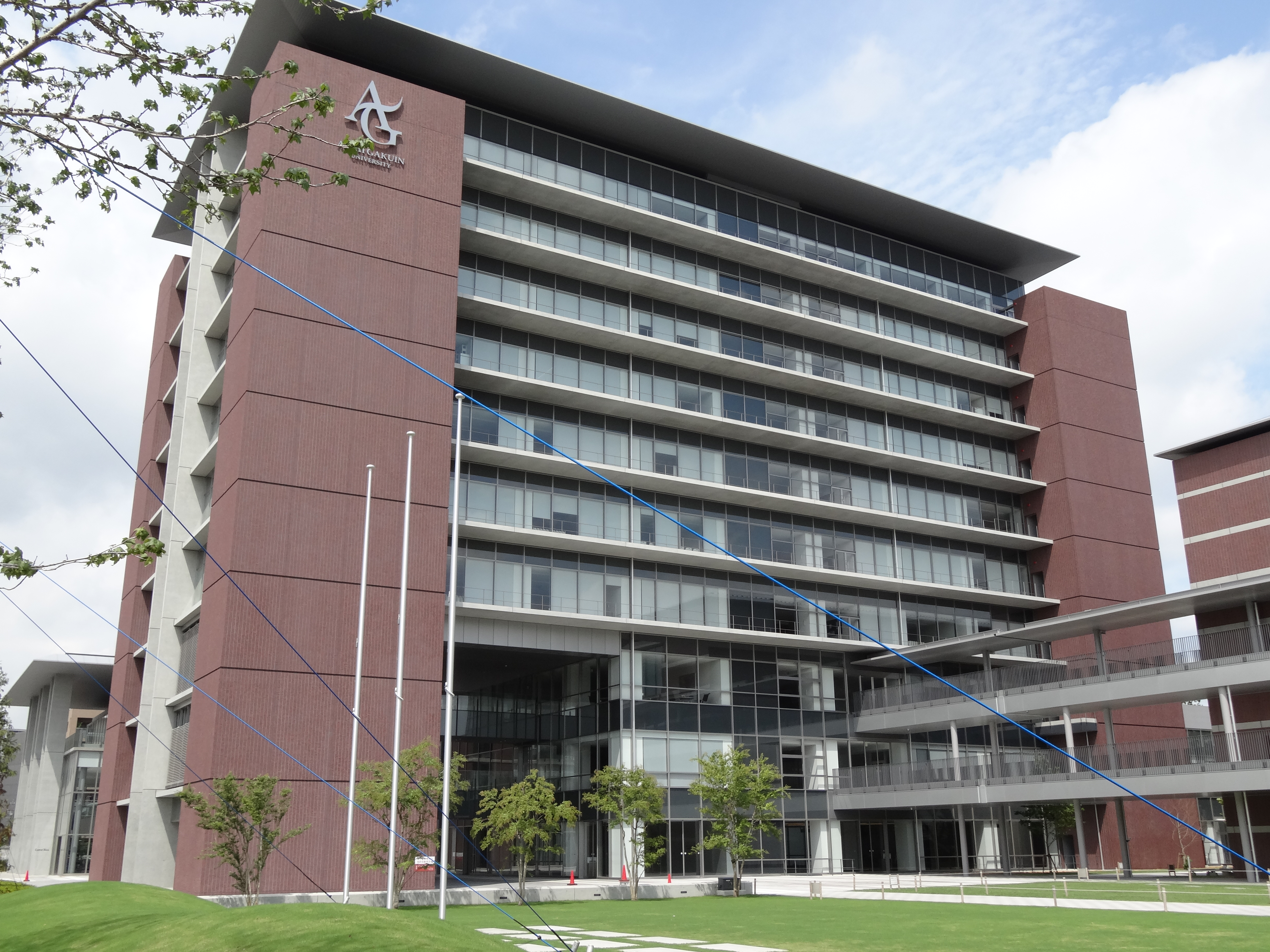
Aichi Gakuin University

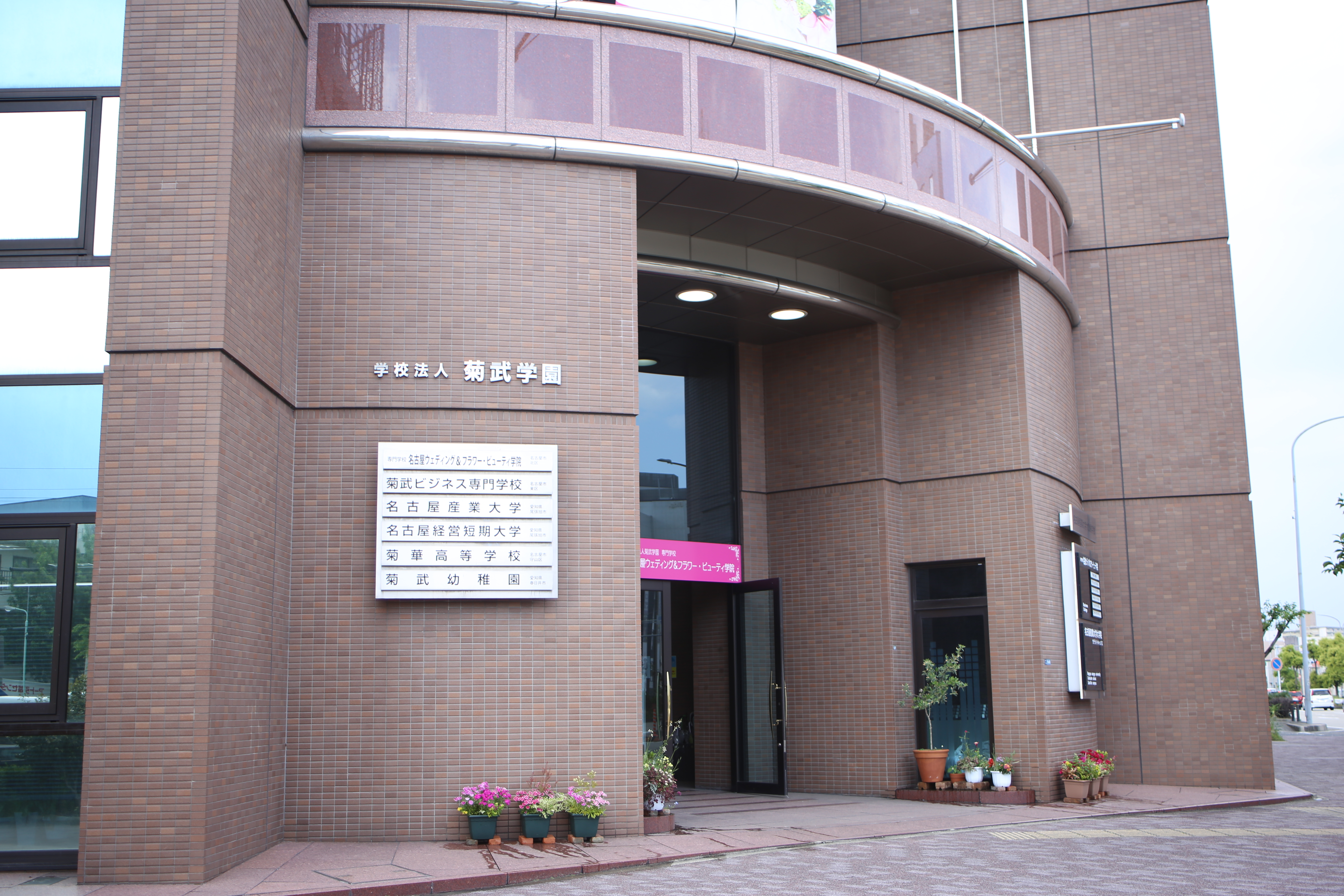
Nagoya Sangyo University Satellite campus

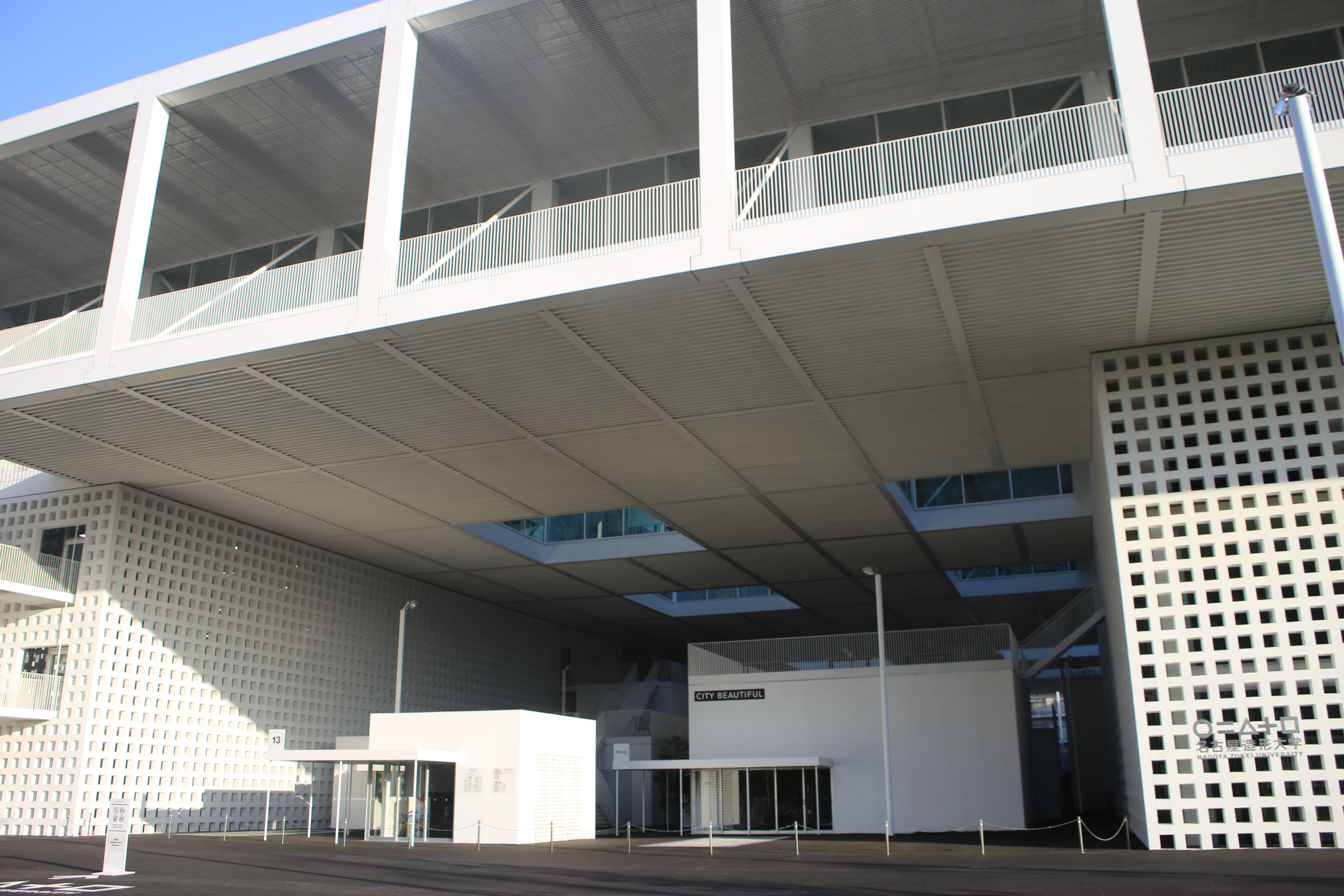
Nagoya Zokei University

== Transportation ==
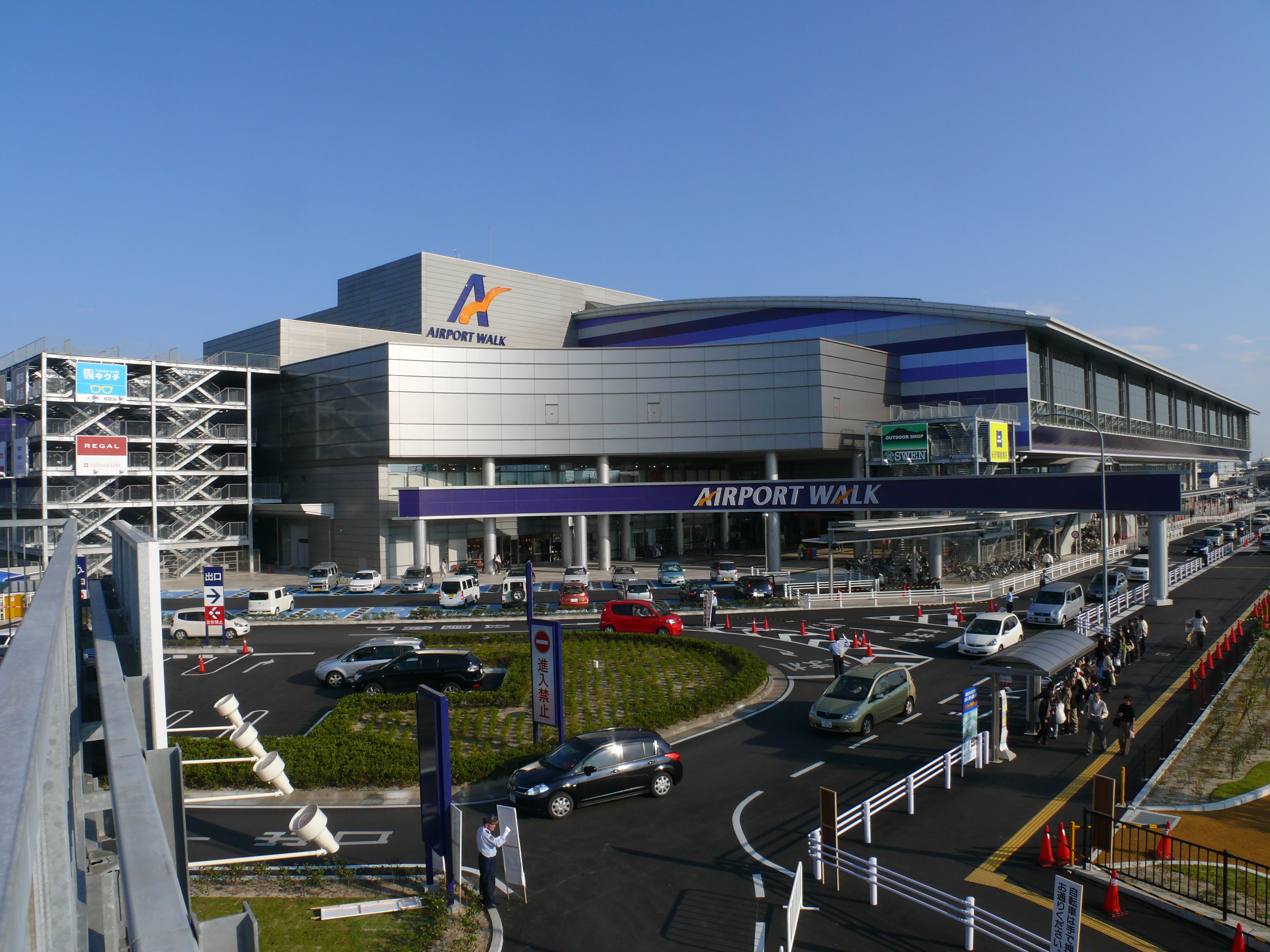
Nagoya Airfield

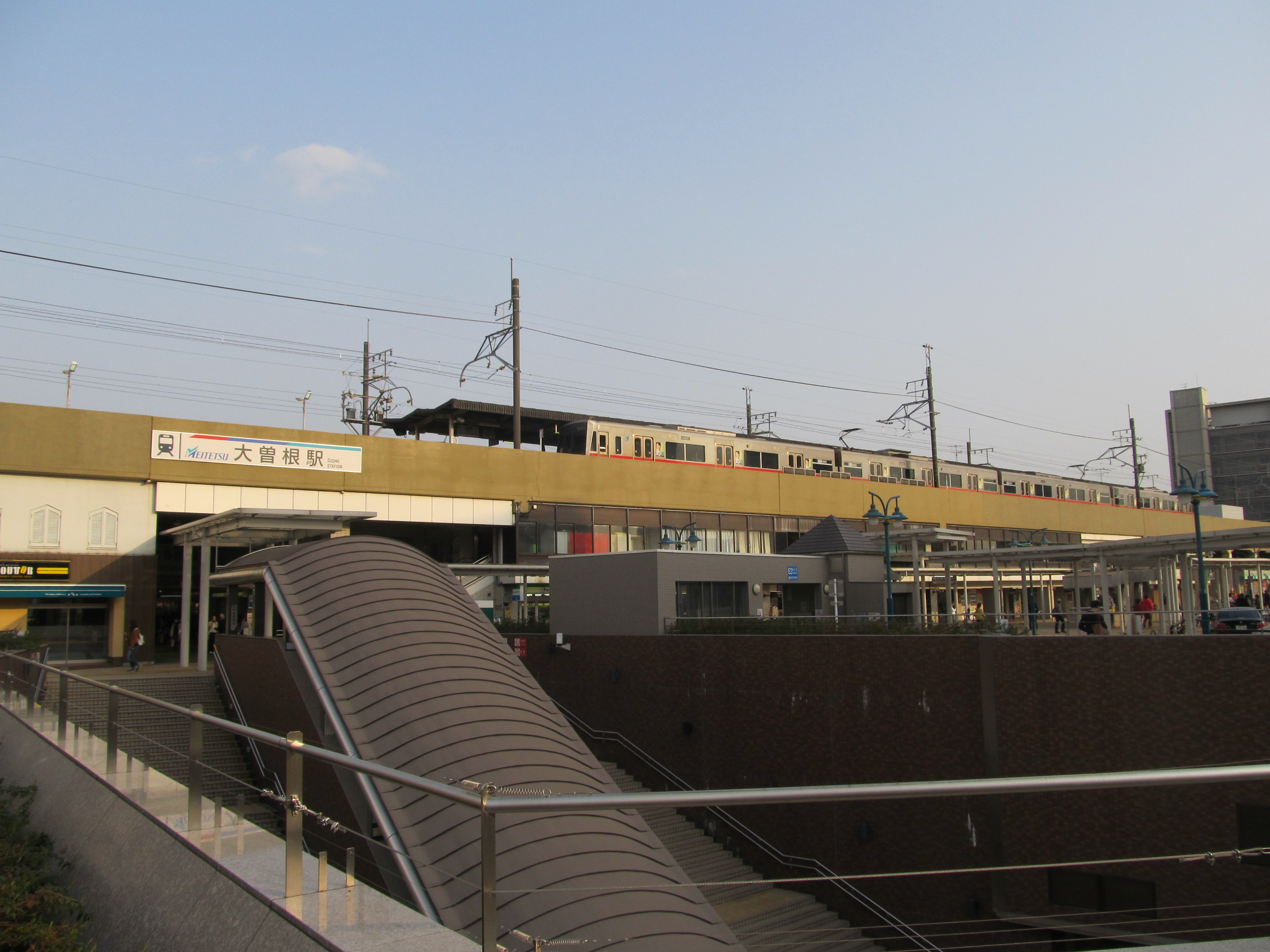
Ōzone Station

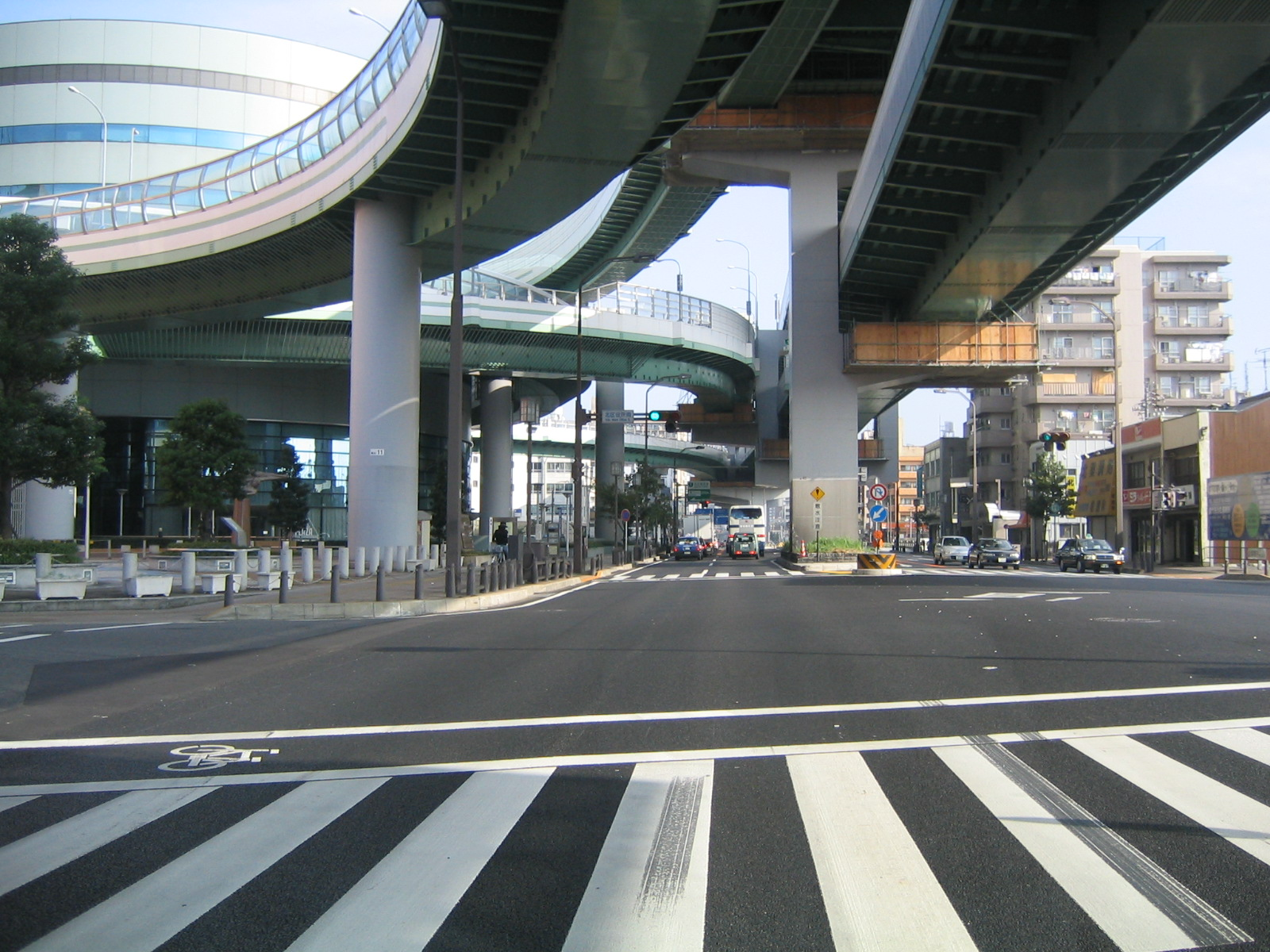
Kurokawa Cross

=== Railroads ===
- Meitetsu - Meitetsu Seto Line
  - Shimizu - Amagasaka
- Meitetsu - Meitetsu Komaki Line
  - Kamiiida - Ajima
- Nagoya Municipal Subway – Meijō Line
  - Meijō Kōen –Kurokawa –Shiga-hondōri –Heian-dōri -Ōzone
- Nagoya Municipal Subway – Kamiiida Line
  - Kamiiida ––Heian-dōri

=== Highways ===
- Nagoya Expressway
- Japan National Route 19
- Japan National Route 41
- Japan National Route 302

== Local attractions ==
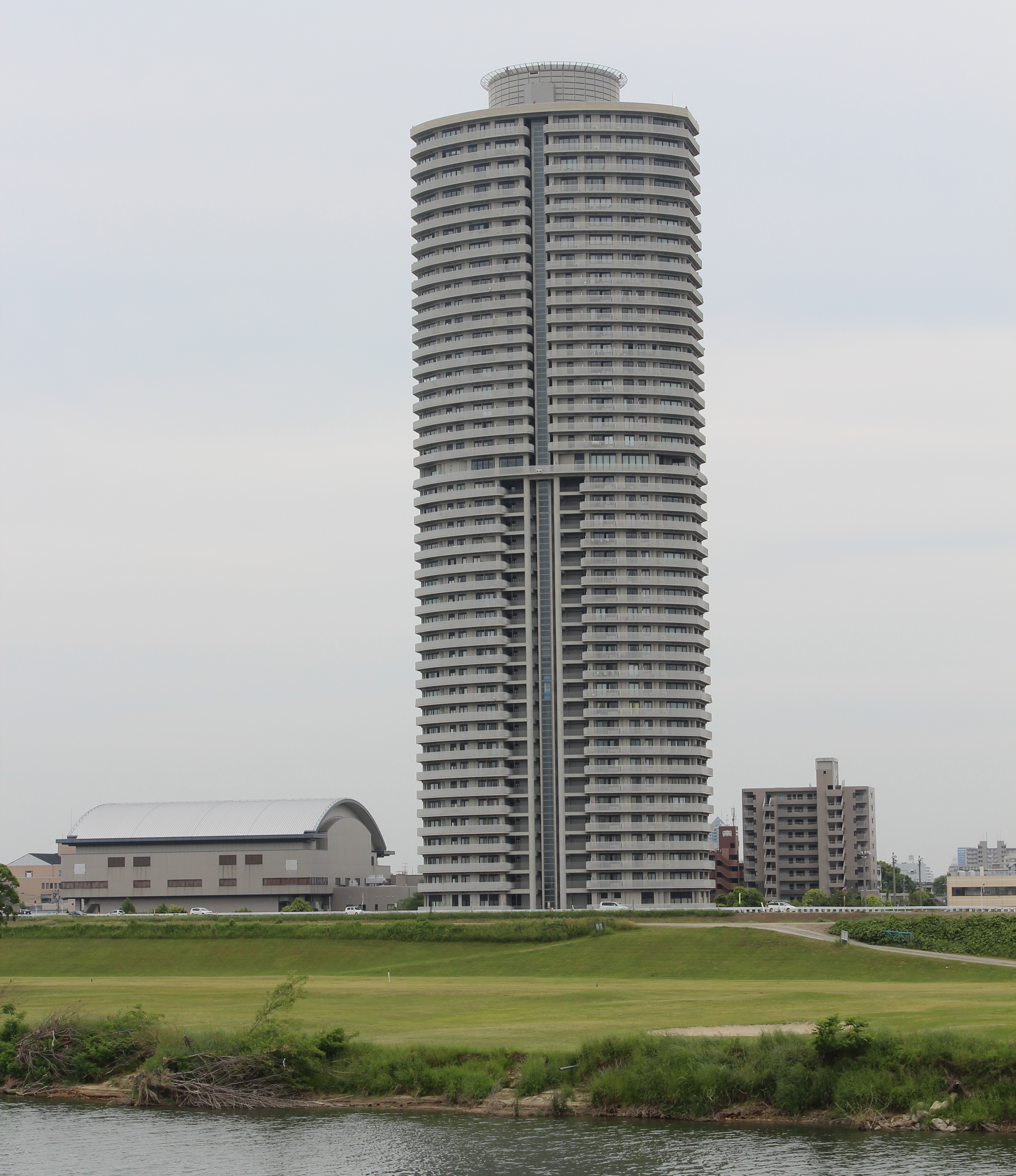
ASTRO Tower

- Meijō Park
  - Tonarino
- Nagoya Airfield
- Ozmall
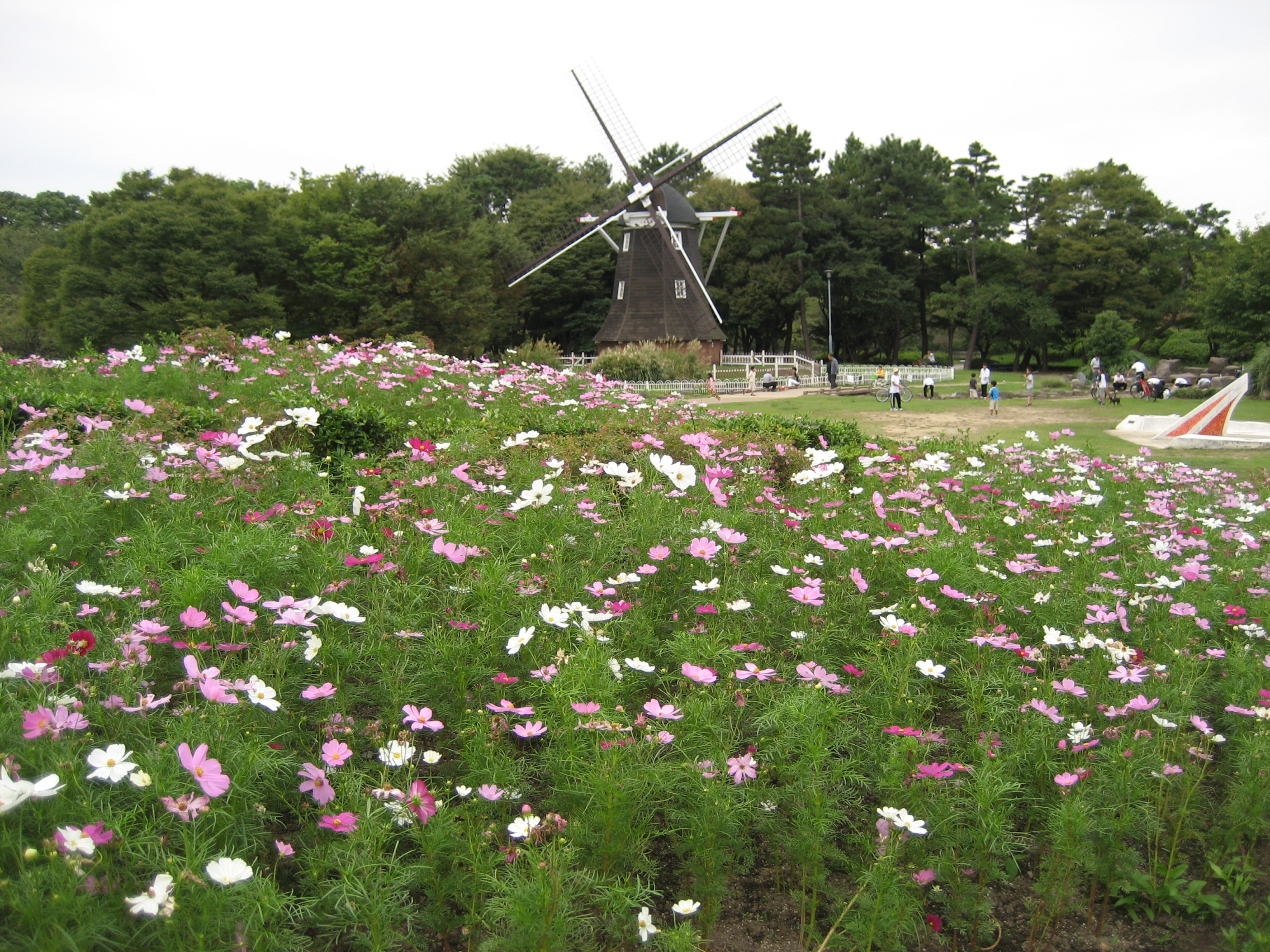
Meijō Park

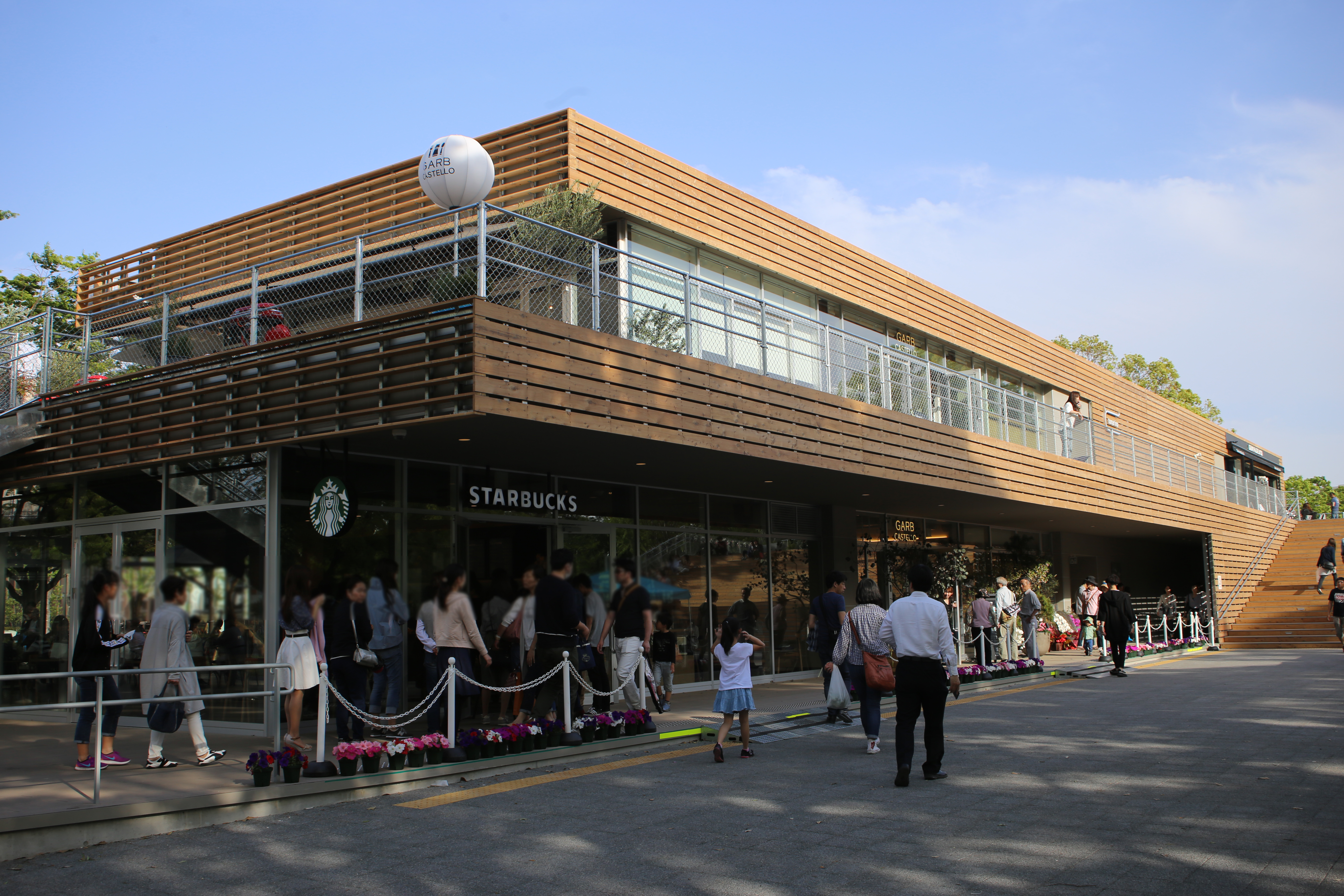
Tonarino

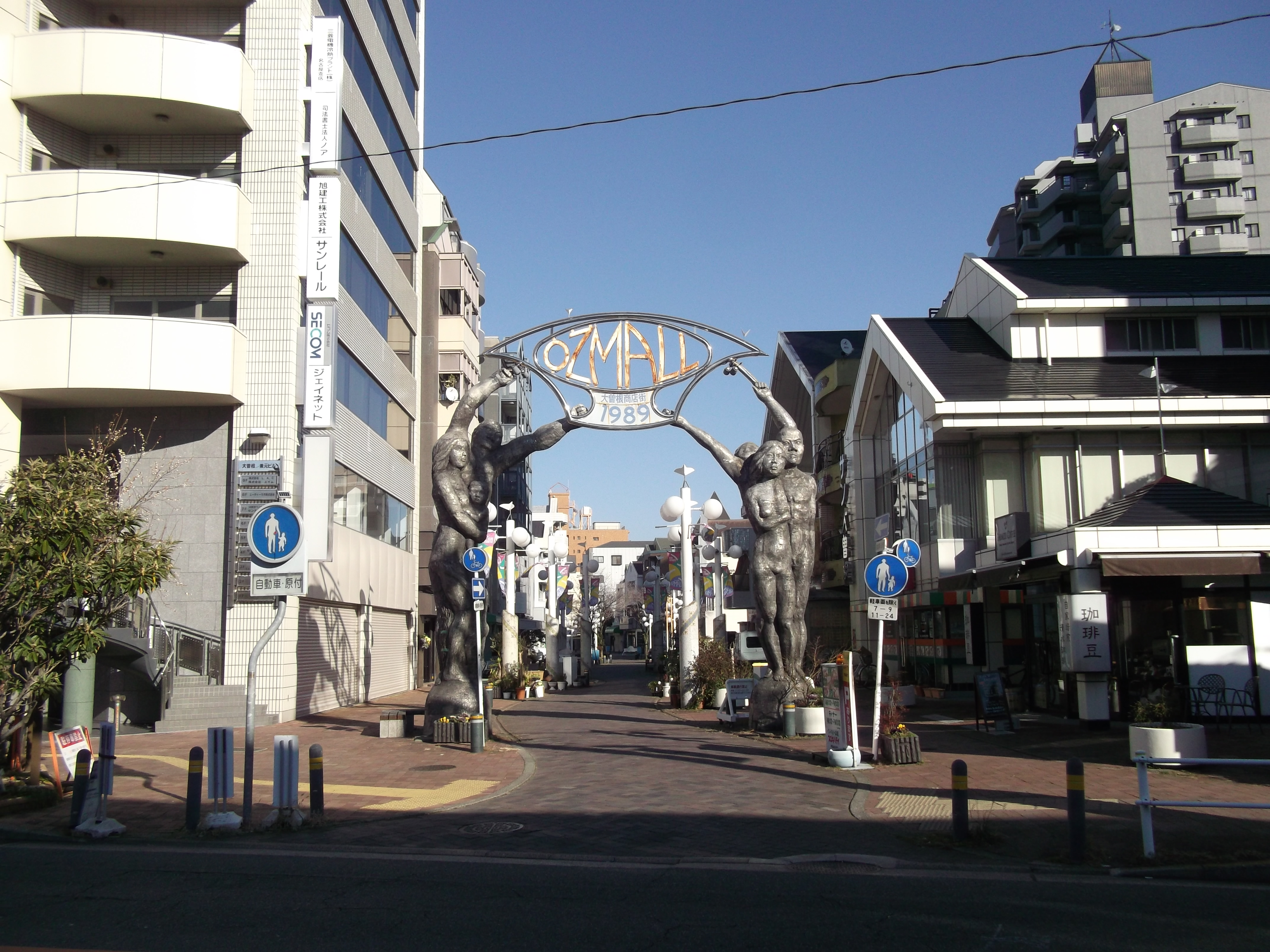
Ozmall
