= Hisaya-ōdōri Station =

Metro station in Nagoya, Japan

Coordinates: 35.1735°N 136.9081°E

M06 S05 Hisaya-ōdōri Station 久屋大通駅
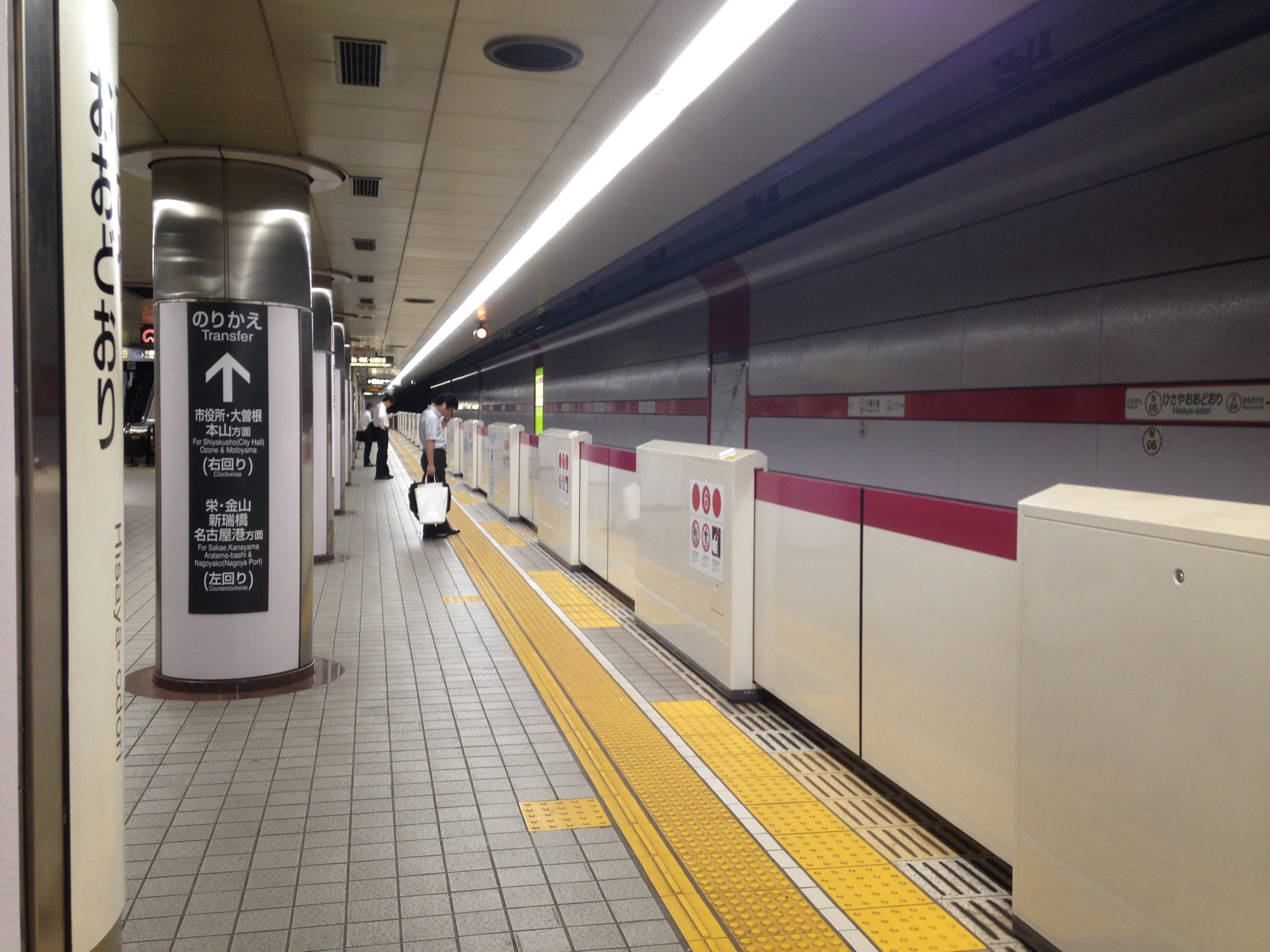

General information
- Location: Nishiki 3-48, Naka, Nagoya, Aichi （名古屋市中区錦三丁目48） Japan
- System: Nagoya Municipal Subway station
- Operator: Transportation Bureau City of Nagoya
- Lines: Meijō Line; Sakura-dōri Line
- Connections: Bus stop

Other information
- Station code: M06; S05

History
- Opened: 9 October 1989; 36 years ago

Passengers
- 2008: 3,238,787

Services
| Preceding station | Nagoya Municipal Subway | Following station |
|---|---|---|
| Sakae M05 anticlockwise | Meijō Line | Nagoyajo M07 clockwise |
| Marunouchi S04 towards Taiko-dori | Sakura-dōri Line | Takaoka S06 towards Tokushige |
Location

Hisaya-ōdōri Station (久屋大通駅, Hisaya-ōdōri-eki; lit. Hisaya Avenue) is an underground metro station located in Naka-ku, Nagoya, Aichi Prefecture, Japan operated by the Nagoya Municipal Subway. It is an interchange station between the Sakura-dōri Line and the Meijō Line and is located 3.3 rail kilometers from the terminus of the Sakura-dōri Line at Taiko-dori Station and 3.4 rail kilometers from the terminus of the Meijō Line at Kanayama Station.

The station is connected underground with Sakae Station (on the subway Meijō Line and Higashiyama Line) and with Sakaemachi Station (the terminus of the Meitetsu Seto Line).

== History ==
Yagoto Station was opened on 9 October 1989 for both the Sakura-dōri Line and the Meijō Line. Platform screen doors were installed on the Sakura-dōri Line platforms from March 2011.

== Lines ==
- Nagoya Municipal Subway
  - Meijō Line (Station number: M06)
  - Sakura-dōri Line (Station number: S05)

== Layout ==
Yagoto Station has one underground island platform for use by the Sakura-dōri Line and two underground opposed side platforms for use by the Meijō Line.

=== Platforms ===
| 1 | ■ Meijō Line | For Sakae, Kanayama, Aratama-bashi, and Nagoyakō |
| 2 | ■ Meijō Line | For Nagoyajo and Ōzone |
| 3 | ■ Sakura-dōri Line | For Imaike, Aratama-bashi and Tokushige |
| 4 | ■ Sakura-dōri Line | For Nagoya and Taiko-dori |
