= Kamiiida Line =

Subway line in Nagoya, Japan

Coordinates: 35°12′00″N 136°55′47″E

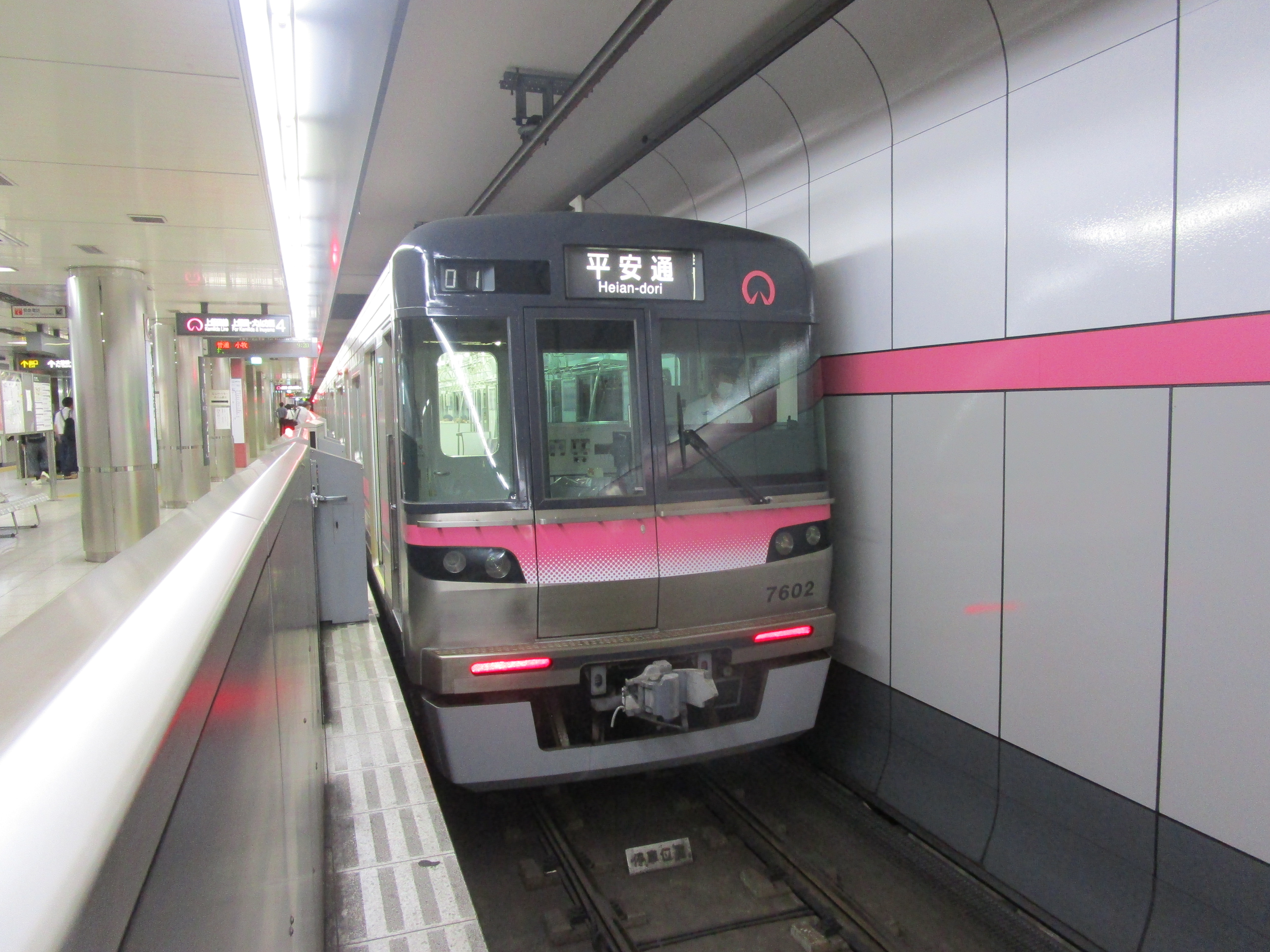
- A 7000 series trainset at Heian-dōri Station

Overview
- Native name: 上飯田線
- Owner: Kami-iida Link Line Co., Ltd. Category 3 owner
- Locale: Nagoya, Aichi
- Termini: Kamiiida; Heian-dori
- Stations: 2

Service
- Type: Rapid transit
- Operator: Nagoya City Subway Category 2 operator
- Rolling stock: Meitetsu 300 series (through service); Nagoya Municipal Subway 7000 series

History
- Opened: 27 March 2003; 23 years ago

Technical
- Line length: 0.8 km (0.50 mi)
- Number of tracks: 2
- Track gauge: 1,067 mm (3 ft 6 in)
- Electrification: 1,500 V DC from overhead catenary
- Operating speed: 75 km/h (47 mph)
- Signalling: CS-ATC

The Kamiiida Line (上飯田線, Kamiiida-sen) is a subway line in Nagoya, Japan, part of the Nagoya Municipal Subway system. It runs between Kamiiida and Heian-dōri, both in Kita Ward, Nagoya, and operates, with through service, as an extension to connect the Meitetsu Komaki Line to the City's Meijō Line. The Kamiiida Line's color on maps is pink and stations are labeled with the prefix "K". Officially, the line is called the Nagoya City Rapid Railway Line 7 (名古屋市高速度鉄道第7号線, Nagoya-shi Kōsokudo Tetsudō Dai-nana-gō-sen).

After the abolishment of Nagoya Municipal Tramway on 31 March 1974, Kamiiida Station, the terminus of Meitetsu's Komaki Line, lost its connection to Nagoya's other railway lines. The Kamiiida Line, serving as link with only two stops officially on the line, was opened in 2003.

== Stations ==
All stations are in Nagoya, Aichi Prefecture.

Number	Station name	Japanese	Total distance	Transfers	Location
↑ Through-services to/from Komaki, Inuyama via the Komaki Line ↑
K01	Kamiiida	上飯田	0 km	Meitetsu: Komaki Line	Kita
K02	Heian-dōri	平安通	0.8 km	Meijō Line (M-11)	Kita

== Rolling stock ==
The Kamiiida Line uses the following train types:

- Nagoya Municipal Subway 7000 series 4-car EMUs
- Meitetsu 300 series 4-car EMUs
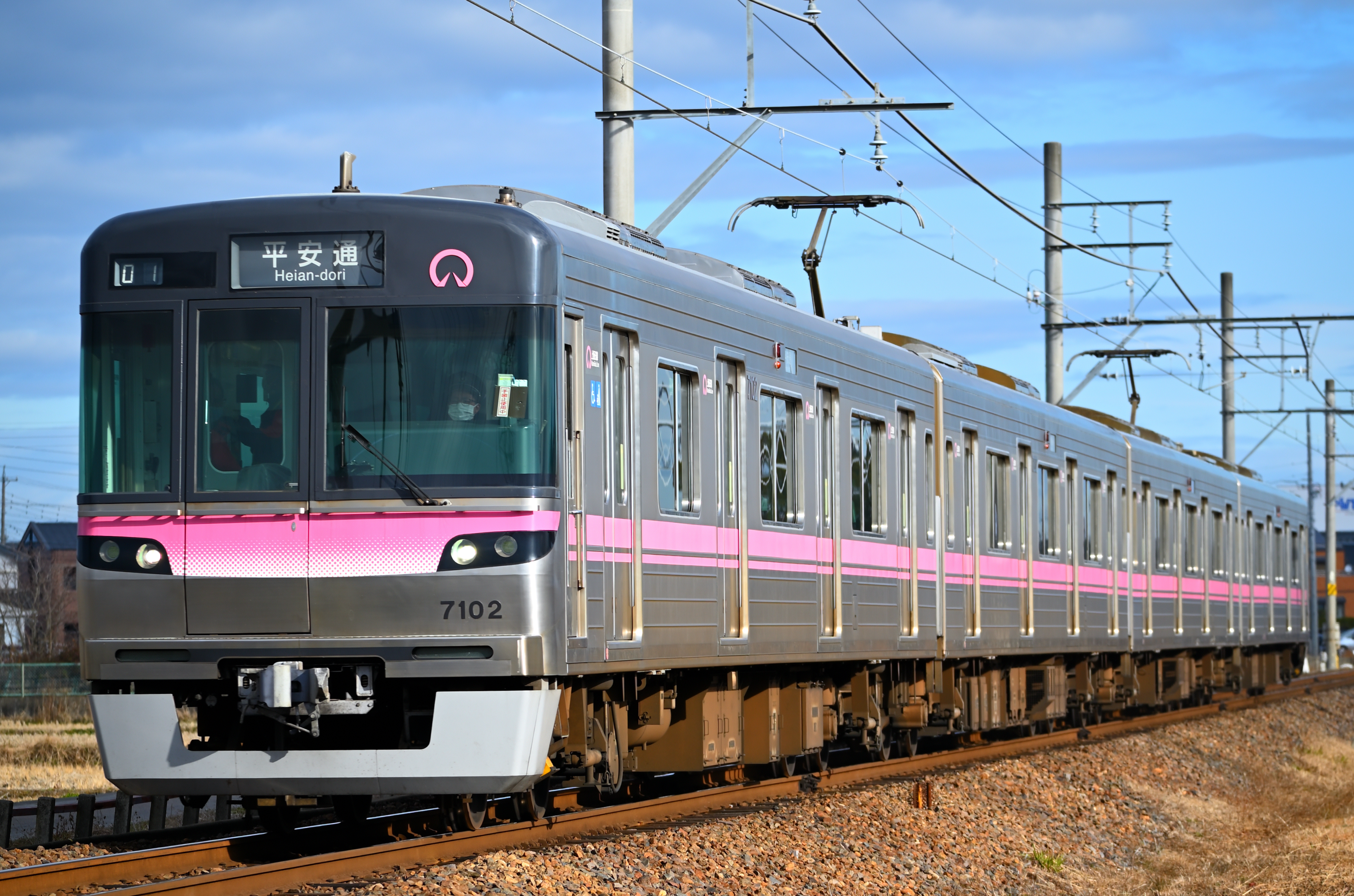
Nagoya Municipal Subway 7000 series

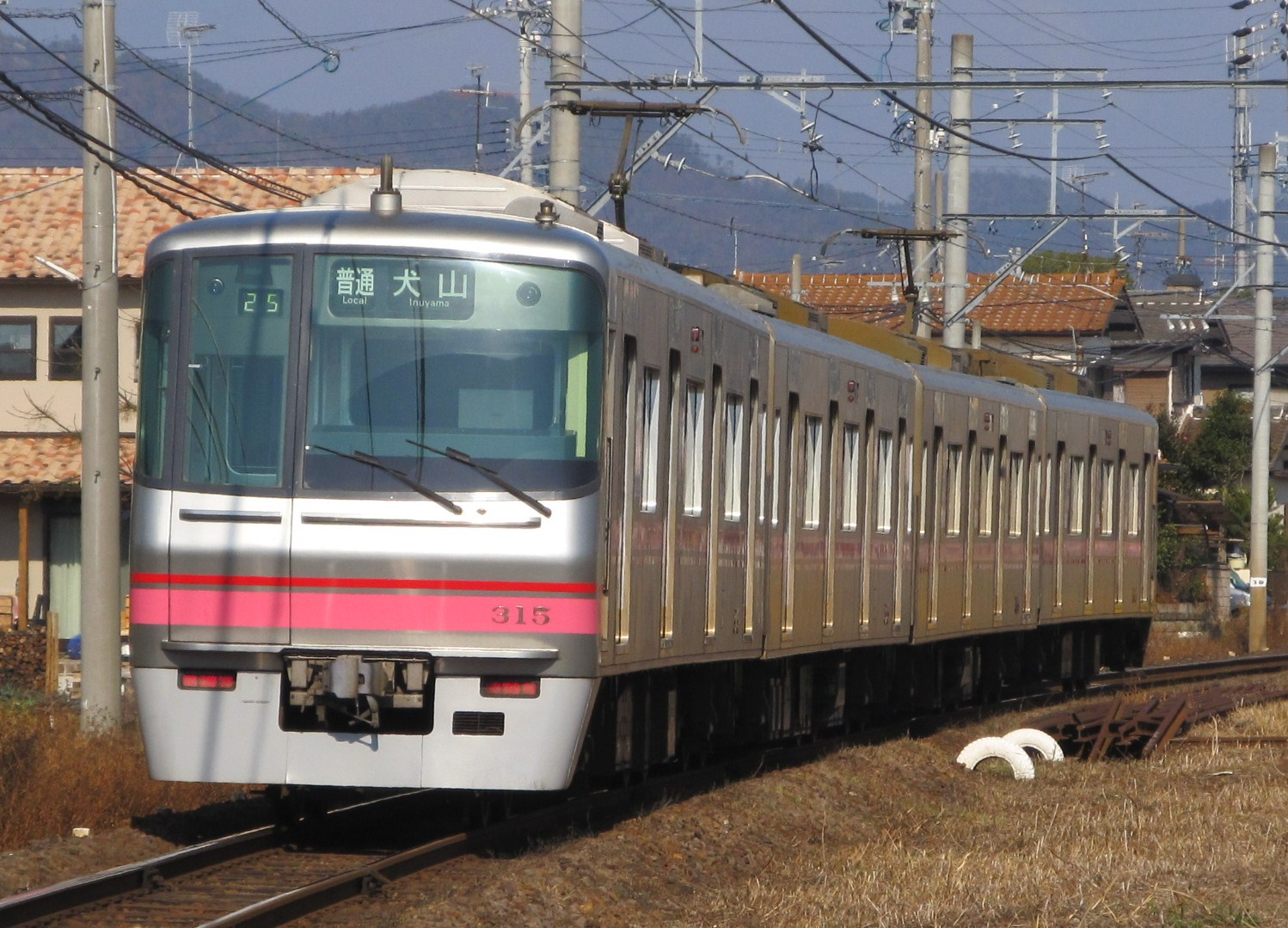
Meitetsu 300 series

== See also ==
- List of railway lines in Japan
