= Meitetsu 300 series =

Japanese train type

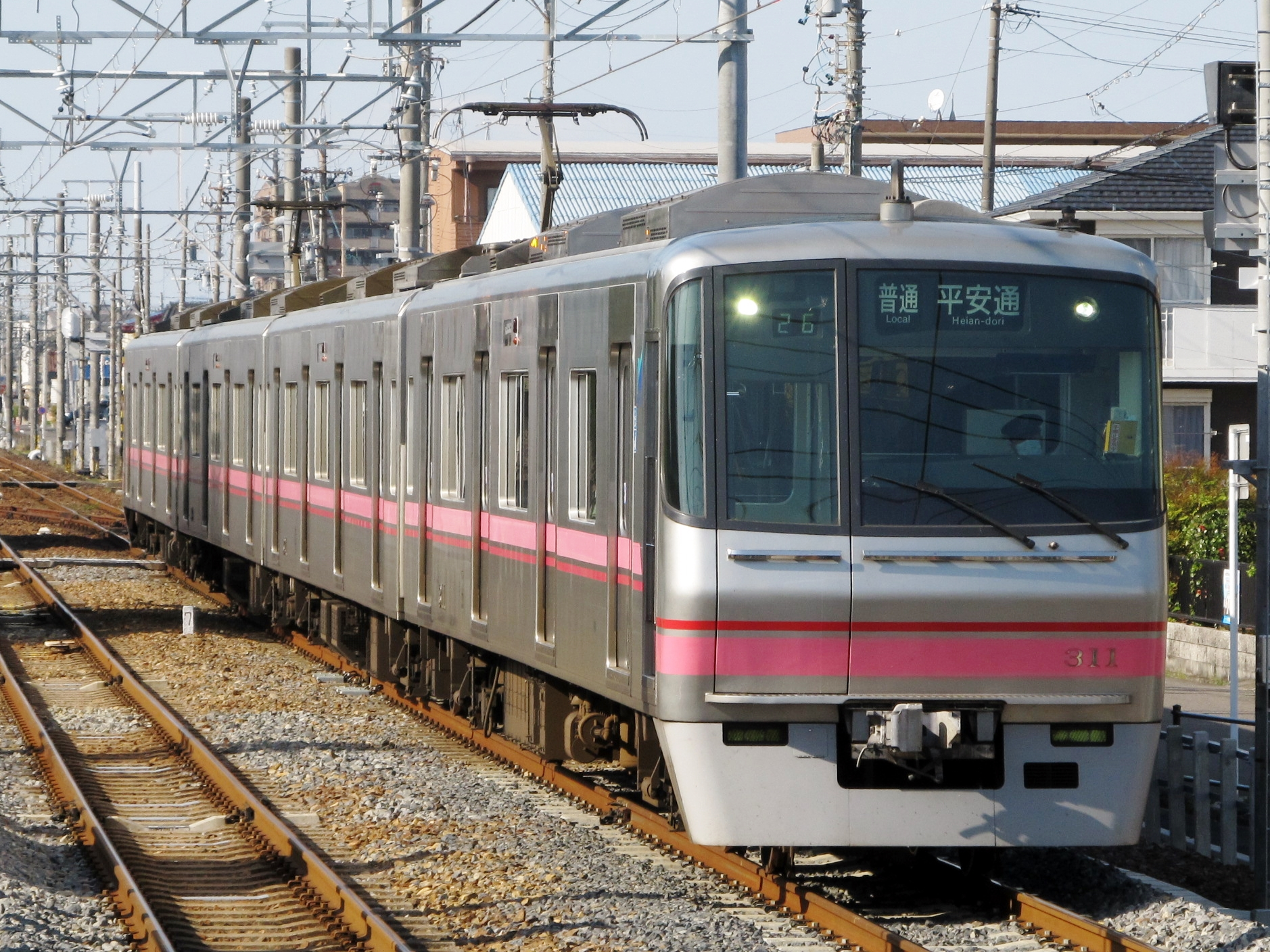
- 301 in April 2021
- In service: 2002–present
- Manufacturer: Nippon Sharyo
- Constructed: 2002
- Entered service: 1 April 2002
- Number built: 32 vehicles (8 sets)
- Number in service: 32 vehicles (8 sets)
- Formation: 4 cars per trainset
- Fleet numbers: 301 - 308
- Capacity: 530
- Operator: Meitetsu
- Lines served: Komaki Line; Kamiiida Line

Specifications
- Car body construction: Stainless steel
- Car length: 19,400 mm (63 ft 8 in) (end cars); 19,300 mm (63 ft 4 in) (intermediate cars)
- Width: 2,746 mm (9 ft 0.1 in)
- Height: 3.62 m (11 ft 11 in)
- Doors: 4 pairs per side
- Maximum speed: 100 km/h (62 mph)
- Traction system: 2-level IGBT–VVVF
- Traction motors: 4 × 170 kW (228 hp) 3-phase AC induction motor
- Power output: 1.36 MW (1,824 hp)
- Acceleration: 3.0 km/(h⋅s) (1.9 mph/s)
- Deceleration: 3.5 km/(h⋅s) (2.2 mph/s) (service); 4.0 km/(h⋅s) (2.5 mph/s) (emergency)
- Electric systems: 1,500 V DC (overhead catenary)
- Current collection: Pantograph
- Bogies: bolsterless
- Safety systems: ATC (Heian-dōri – Ajima); Meitetsu ATS (Ajima – Inuyama)
- Track gauge: 1,067 mm (3 ft 6 in)

The Meitetsu 300 series (名鉄300系) is a commuter electric multiple unit operated by Nagoya Railroad (Meitetsu) on the Meitetsu Komaki Line and inter-running services through the Nagoya Subway Kamiiida Line in Japan since 2002. They operate alongside the Nagoya Municipal Subway 7000 series introduced in 2003.

== Design ==
The 300 series is Meitetsu's first train type to use stainless steel construction. Its design served as a basis for the 3300 and 3150 series introduced in 2004.

Internally, the trains are equipped with a mixture of longitudinal and transverse seating, with transverse seats at the ends of each car. Priority seating and wheelchair spaces are provided.

Interior

== Formation ==
The trainsets are formed as follows.

	← Heian-dōri Inuyama →			
Car No.	1	2	3	4
Designation	Ku 310 (Tc1)	Mo 320 (M2)	Mo 330 (M1)	Ku 340 (Tc2)
Weight (t)	30.4	37.0	34.6	30.4
Capacity Total/seated	130/39	135/46	135/46	130/39

The M1 and M2 cars are each fitted with one single-arm pantograph.

== History ==
The first cars were delivered in 2002, entering service from April 2002.
