= Meijō Park =

Park in Nagoya, Japan

- 名城公園
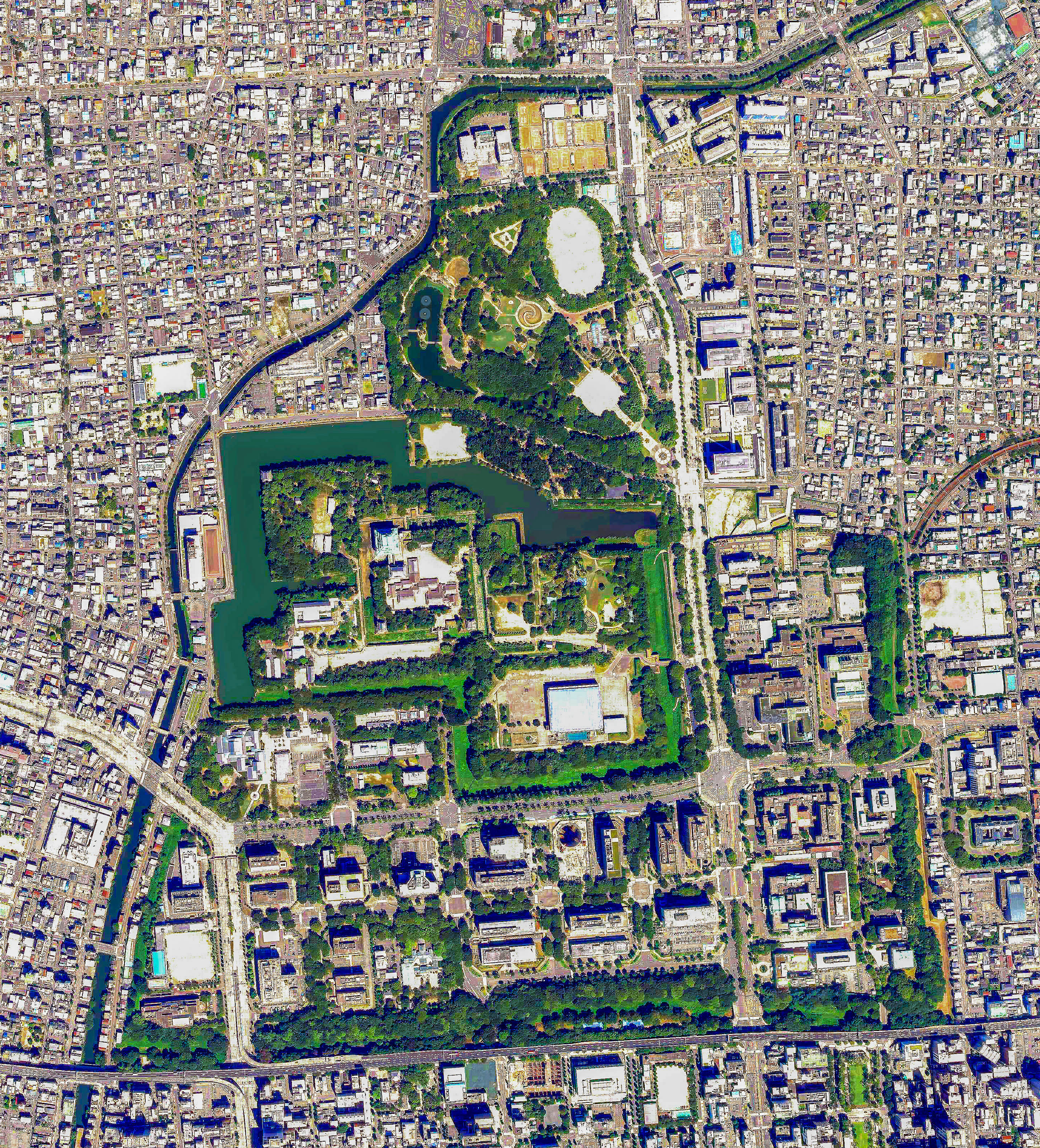
- Satellite view of Meijō Park (located in the north) in 2020
- Interactive map of Meijō Park
- Type: Urban park
- Location: Kita-ku, Nagoya, Japan
- Coordinates: 35.186°N 136.900°E
- Area: 76 hectares (190 acres)
- Created: 1931
- Operator: Nagoya City, Parks Department

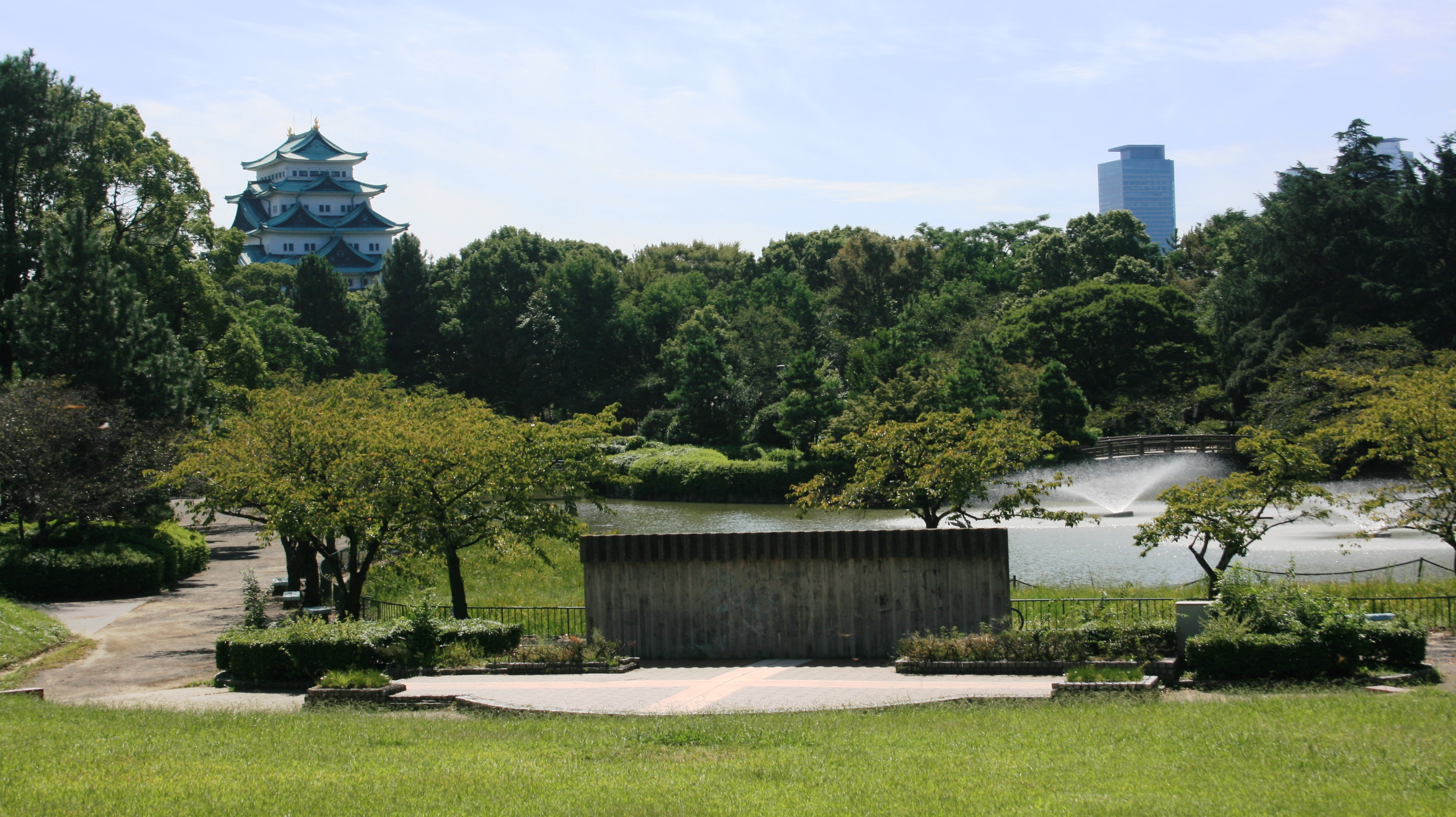
Ofuke Pond in Meijō Park with Nagoya Castle in the back

Meijō Park (名城公園, Meijō Kōen) is a public park surrounding Nagoya Castle in Kita-ku, Nagoya, Japan.

== History ==
The name Meijō derives itself from the abbreviated kanji form of Nagoya Castle (名古屋城, Nagoya-jō). In effect, the park's name translated means "Nagoya Castle Park", since it lies to the north of the castle and used to be a part of its wider compound.

The park is located on the site of the former Shimo Ofuke-oniwa (下御深井御庭), also known as Ofuke-niwa (御深井庭), of the Edo period. The Ofuke Garden was a large garden centering on a pond that was left over from the low marshland that existed on the north side of the castle when Nagoya Castle was built, and served as a defense for the north side of the castle. The pond had a number of small islands and the area was cultivated as a Japanese garden. It is said that the third shōgun Tokugawa Iemitsu admired this garden when he visited and used it as a model for the Fukiage part of Edo Castle. The area was used a secret garden. In 1820 at least three different tea houses were located around the pond. One was the Takenaga tea house (竹長押御茶屋) located to the south close to Benten Island, the Seto tea house (瀬戸御茶屋) next to the Seto Mount to the east, and the Matsuyama tea house (松山御茶屋) to the north. Located west of the Ofuke Garden was lord Tokugawa Naritomo's Shin Goten (新御殿 New Palace) in what is today Horibata-chō (堀端町).

The area was originally larger, incorporating land to the east of today's park across Otsu-dori where Aichi Gakuin University - Meijo Koen Campus is located.

During the Kan'ei era (1624-44), the first lord of Owari, Tokugawa Yoshinao (1600-50) had a noborigama kiln constructed at the eastern corner of the Ofuke garden and invited potters from Seto. Pottery was made at the kiln until the Meiji era.

After the Meiji era, the land was reclaimed and used as a military drill ground. The area was converted into a public park in 1931.

== Facilities ==
The park includes Aichi Prefectural Gymnasium and Nagoya City Archives, as well as other facilities. Periodically, flower exhibits are held in this park. In addition, the park itself has many flowers being cultivated inside, including famously its wisteria, which usually bloom at the end of April and beginning of May, and especially its cherry blossoms, which usually bloom at the beginning of April.

== Access ==
Meijō Kōen Station provide access to the park. Meijō Kōen Station is named after this park, and the subway line it is on, namely the Meijō Line, is named after Nagoya Castle.

== See also ==
- Nagoya Castle
