= Nagoya Municipal Subway 7000 series =

Japanese train type

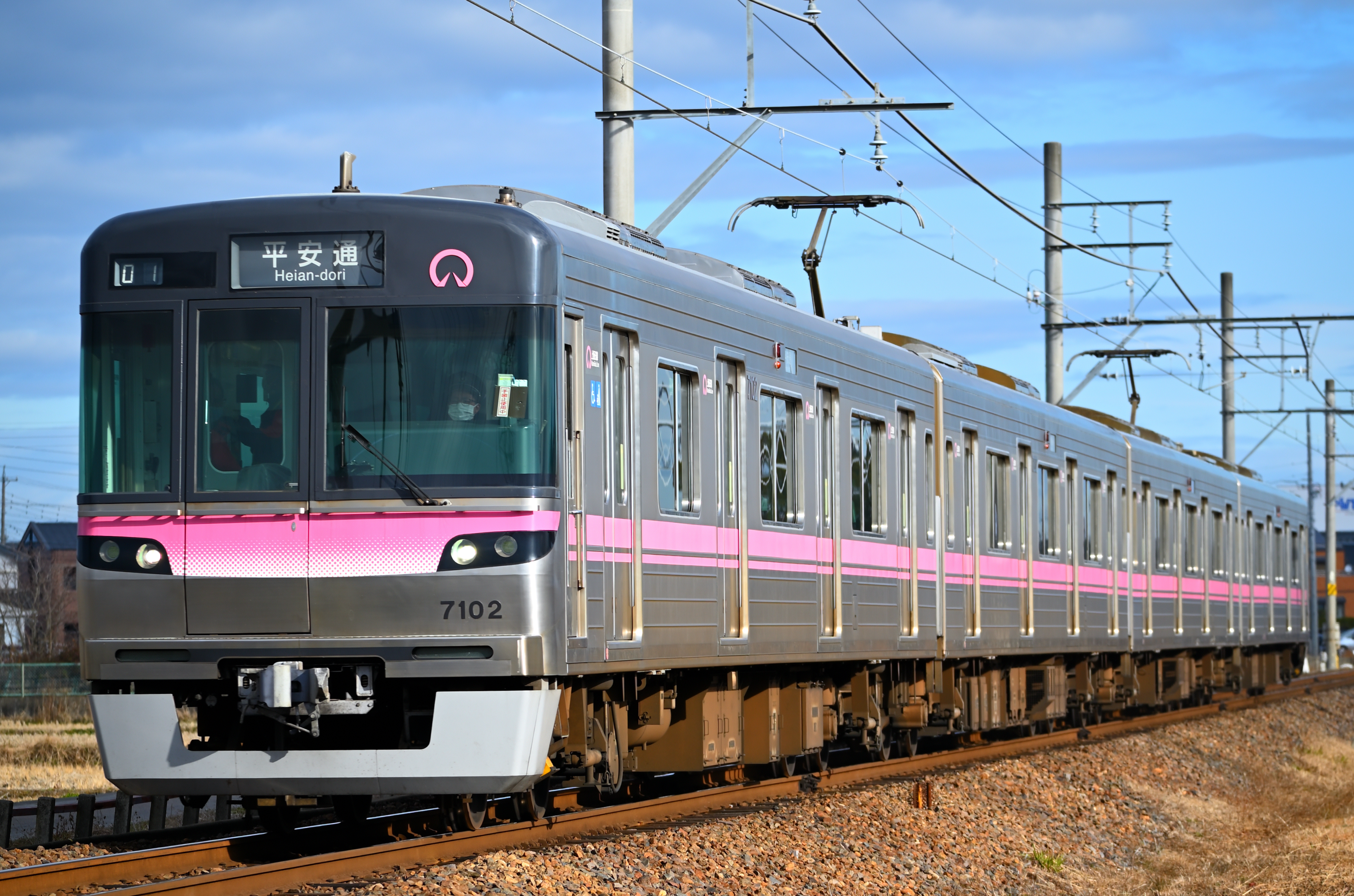
- 7002 in December 2022
- In service: 2003–present
- Manufacturer: Nippon Sharyo
- Constructed: 2003
- Entered service: 27 March 2003
- Number built: 8 vehicles (2 sets)
- Number in service: 8 vehicles (2 sets)
- Formation: 4 cars per trainset
- Fleet numbers: 7001, 7002
- Capacity: 526
- Operators: Transportation Bureau City of Nagoya
- Lines served: Kamiiida Line, Meitetsu Komaki Line

Specifications
- Car body construction: Stainless steel
- Car length: 19.4 m (63 ft 8 in) (end cars); 19.3 m (63 ft 4 in) (intermediate cars)
- Width: 2,746 mm (9 ft 0.1 in)
- Height: 4.01 m (13 ft 2 in)
- Floor height: 1.11 m (3 ft 8 in)
- Doors: 4 pairs per side
- Maximum speed: 100 km/h (62 mph)
- Traction system: IGBT–VVVF inverter vector control
- Traction motors: 4 × 170 kW (228 hp) 3-phase AC induction motor
- Power output: 1.36 MW (1,824 hp)
- Acceleration: 0.83 m/s^{2} (1.9 mph/s)
- Deceleration: 0.97 m/s^{2} (2.2 mph/s) (service); 1.1 m/s^{2} (2.5 mph/s) (emergency)
- Electric system(s): 1,500 V DC (nominal) from overhead catenary
- Current collector(s): Pantograph
- Track gauge: 1,067 mm (3 ft 6 in)

The Nagoya Municipal Subway 7000 series (名古屋市交通局7000形) is a rapid transit electric multiple unit (EMU) operated by the Transportation Bureau City of Nagoya on the Nagoya Subway Kamiiida Line and inter-running services through to the Meitetsu Komaki Line in Japan since 2003. They operate alongside the Meitetsu 300 series EMUs.

== Formation ==
The trainsets are formed as follows. (Left is toward Heian-dōri Station and right is toward Inuyama Station)

Car No.	1	2	3	4
Designation	Tc1	M2	M1	Tc2
Numbering	7100	7200	7300	7600
Weight (t)	29.7	37.0	34.8	29.8
Capacity Total/seated	128/39	135/46		128/39

The M1 and M2 cars are each fitted with one single-arm pantograph.

== History ==
The first trains entered service on 27 March 2003.
