= Nagoyajo Station =

Metro station in Nagoya, Japan

Coordinates: 35°10′53.5259″N 136°54′19.36″E

M07 Nagoyajo Station 名古屋城駅
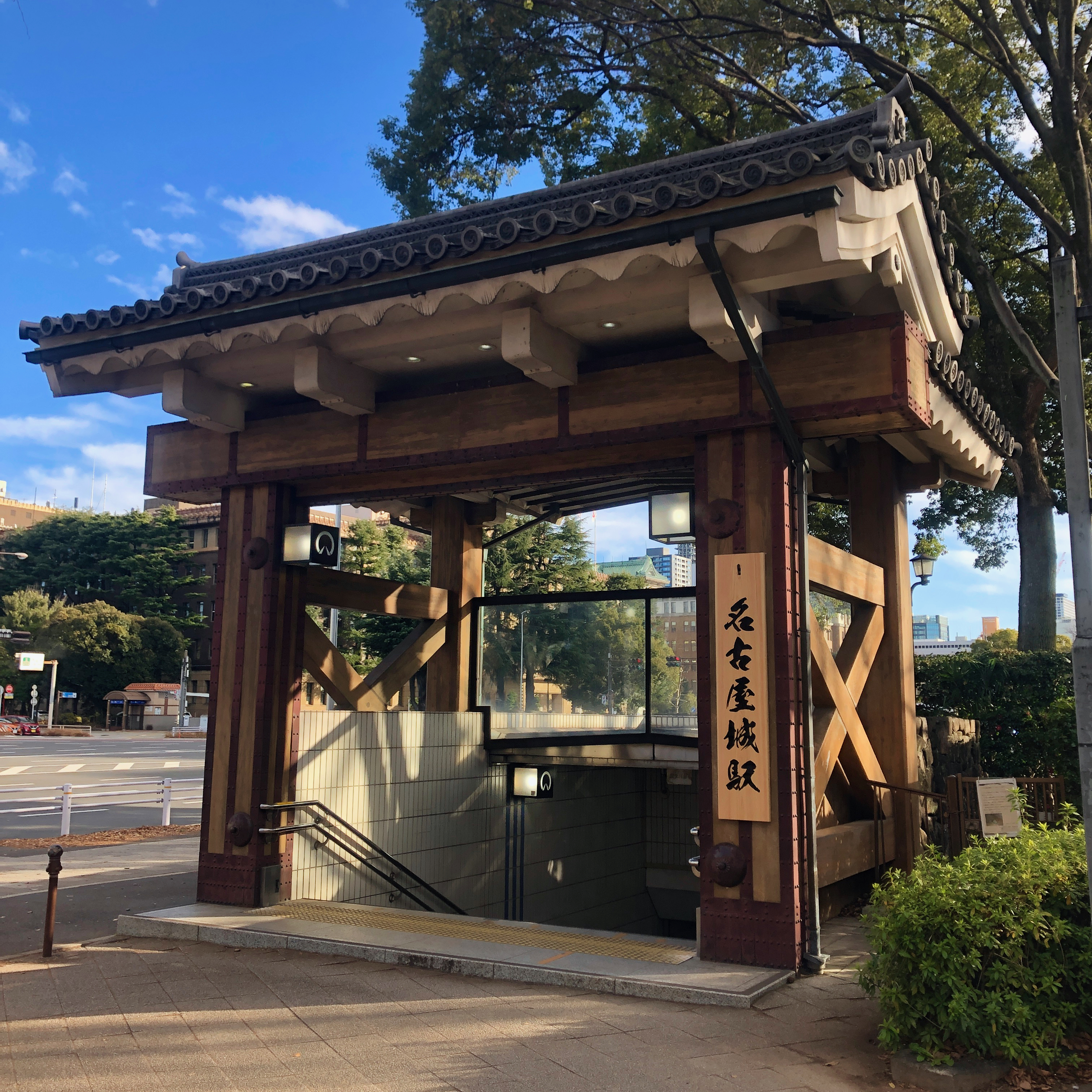
- Exit 7 built as a traditional Kōrai-mon with the wooden name sign in calligraphy

General information
- Location: Sannomaru 3-1-1, Naka, Nagoya, Aichi （名古屋市中区三の丸三丁目1-1） Japan
- System: Nagoya Municipal Subway station
- Operator: Transportation Bureau City of Nagoya
- Line: Meijō Line
- Connections: Bus terminal

Other information
- Station code: M07

History
- Opened: 15 October 1965; 60 years ago
- Former names: Shiyakusho (市役所) (lit. City Hall) - Until 2023

Passengers
- 2008: 7,076,285

Services
Preceding station	Nagoya Municipal Subway	Following station
Hisaya-ōdōri M06 anticlockwise	Meijō Line	Meijō Kōen M08 clockwise
Location

Nagoyajo Station (名古屋城駅, Nagoyajō-eki; lit. "Nagoya Castle Station") is an underground metro station located in Naka-ku, Nagoya, Aichi Prefecture, Japan operated by the Nagoya Municipal Subway. It is located 4.3 rail kilometers from the terminus of the Meijō Line at Kanayama Station. This station provides access to its namesake, Nagoya Castle, as well as Nagoya City Hall, the Aichi Prefectural Government Office, the Nagoya City Archives, and the Nagoya Noh Theatre.

== History ==
The station was opened on 15 October 1965.

The station was originally called Shiyakusho Station (市役所駅, Shiyakusho-eki; City Hall Station). It was renamed on 4 January 2023 as part of efforts by the Nagoya city government to help visitors seeking access to Nagoya Castle, and following complaints that would-be visitors were mistakenly stopping at Meijō Kōen Station due to its name having the kanji character for the castle.

== Lines ==
- Nagoya Municipal Subway
  - Meijō Line (Station number: M07)

== Layout ==
The station has one underground island platform.

Entrance No. 7 is built as a wooden traditional Kōrai-mon (高麗門 "Goryeo") gate.

At the end of the northern exits is a large painting of a bird-eye view of Nagoya Castle during the Edo period. This painting was produced by the Institute for Cultural Environment Planning Co., Ltd. by Naitō Akira (内藤昌) and Suzuki Norio (鈴木 規夫).

=== Platforms ===
1	■ Meijō Line	For Sakae, Kanayama, Aratama-bashi, and Nagoyakō
2	■ Meijō Line	For Ōzone and Motoyama
