= Nagoya Noh Theater =

Noh drama theatre in Nagoya, Japan

Coordinates: 35°11′25.88″N 136°54′13.35″E

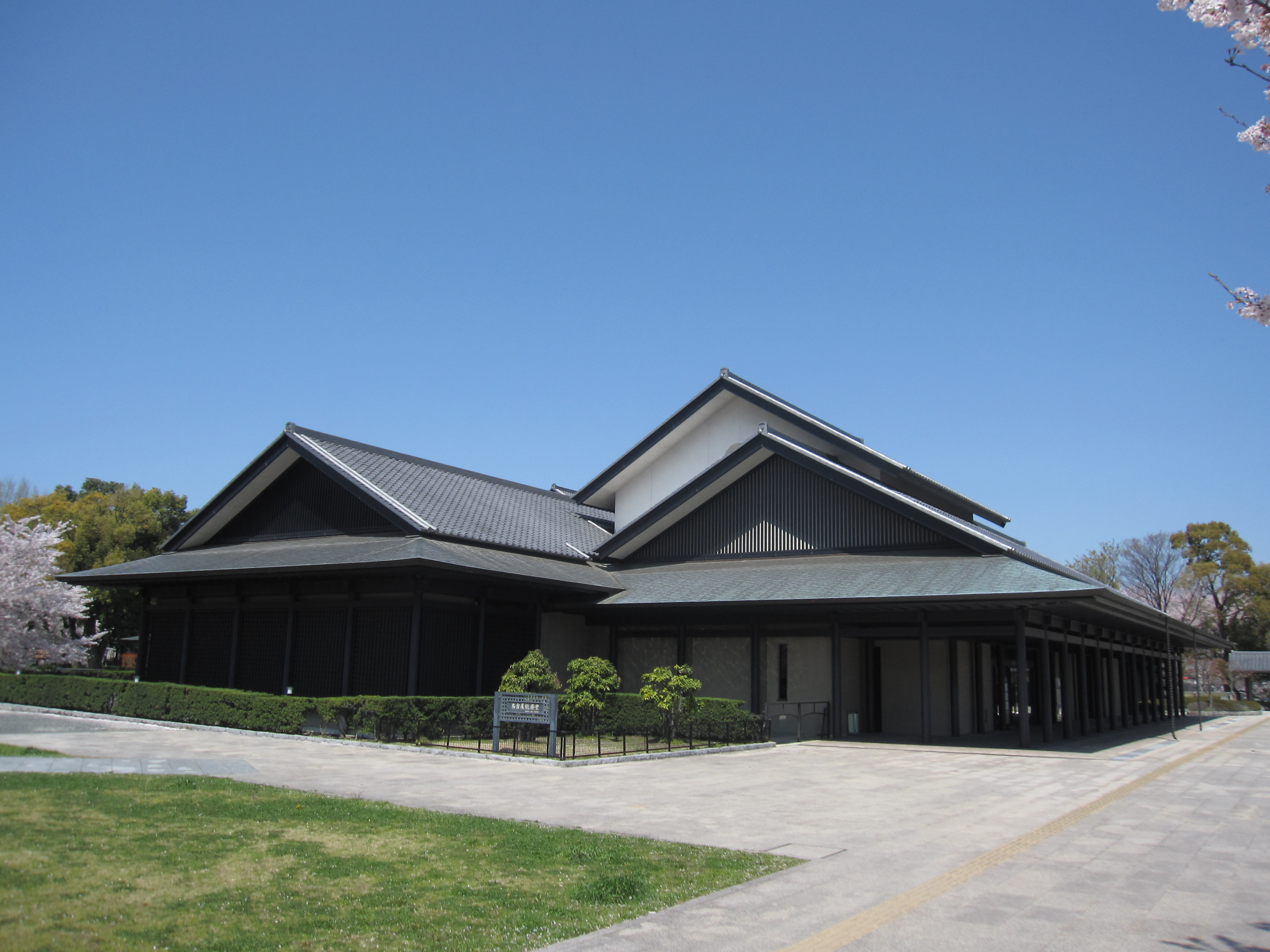
Nagoya Noh Theater

The Nagoya Noh Theater (名古屋能楽堂) is a Noh drama theatre building located in the city of Nagoya, central Japan.

== History ==
The history of Noh in Owari Province dates back to the heyday of feudal rule, when performances were shown at the Ninomaru Palace of Nagoya Castle. The palace had two stages for performances of Noh: the omote-butai, or front stage, and oku-butai, the rear stage. Noh was performed to commemorate a lord's succession to a fiefdom and to celebrate the birth of an heir. The Owari branch of the ruling Tokugawa clan were patrons of many Noh actors. A reconstruction of one of the Noh stages of the Ninomaru can be seen in the Tokugawa Art Museum. The city also has an association for Noh and for mask makers.

The modern Nagoya Noh Theatre was commissioned by the city government and opened in April 1997 and is situated just south of today's visitors' main gate of Nagoya Castle in the outer San-no-maru enceinte.

== Architecture ==
Its outer architecture evokes the traditional roofs and structures of the Noh theatre, the interior is equipped with modern technology, but features a traditional wooden stage constructed out of Hinoki cypress from the Kiso area. The structure is steel-reinforced concrete and has one storey with a basement. The total floor space excluding the mezzanine area is 5,200 m2.

The main stage (hon butai) measures 34.93 meter square (5.91m x5.91m) within the pillars, the angle between the stage passage (hashigakari) and main stage is 102.5 degrees, the length is 11.89 metres and the width within the pillars 2.7 metres.

The theatre has 630 seats. It is a prominent feature in the cultural life of Nagoya and the Noh, as well as Kyōgen performances are played monthly. The building also houses artefacts of Noh theatre.

Access by public transport is Nagoyajo Station on the Meijo Line, or Sengen-chō Station.
