= Sakae Station (Nagoya) =

Metro station in Nagoya, Japan

Coordinates: 35.169989°N 136.908177°E

M05 H10 Sakae Station 栄駅
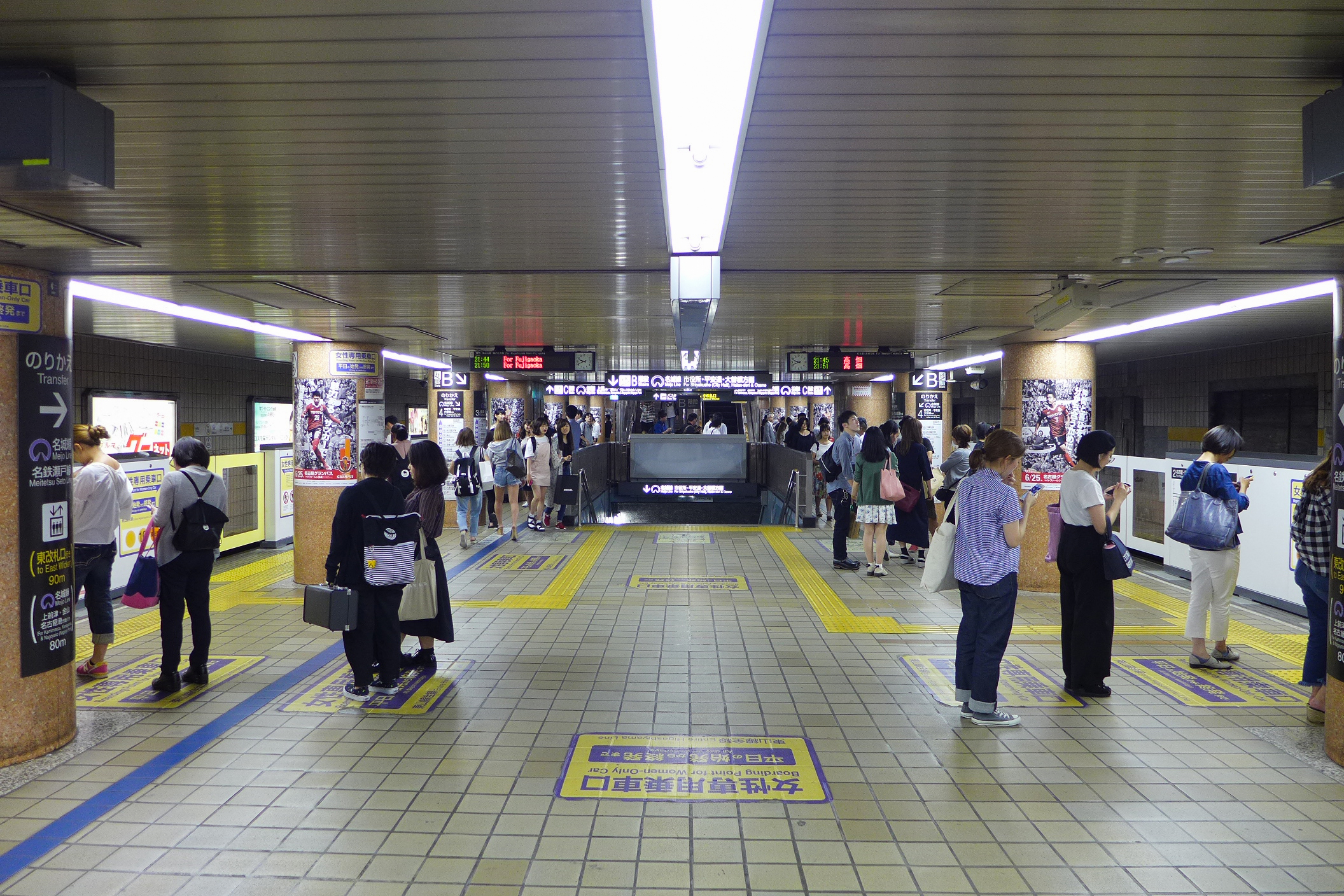
- Sakae Station Higashiyama Line Platform

General information
- Location: Sakae 3-5-12, Naka, Nagoya, Aichi （名古屋市中区栄三丁目5-12） Japan
- System: Nagoya Municipal Subway station
- Operator: Transportation Bureau City of Nagoya
- Lines: Meijō Line; Higashiyama Line
- Connections: Bus terminal

History
- Opened: 15 November 1957; 68 years ago
- Former names: Sakaemachi (until 1966)

Passengers
- 2008: 26,376,104

Services
Preceding station	Nagoya Municipal Subway	Following station
Yabachō M04 anticlockwise	Meijō Line	Hisaya-ōdōri M06 clockwise
Fushimi H09 towards Takabata	Higashiyama Line	Shinsakae-machi H11 towards Fujigaoka
Location

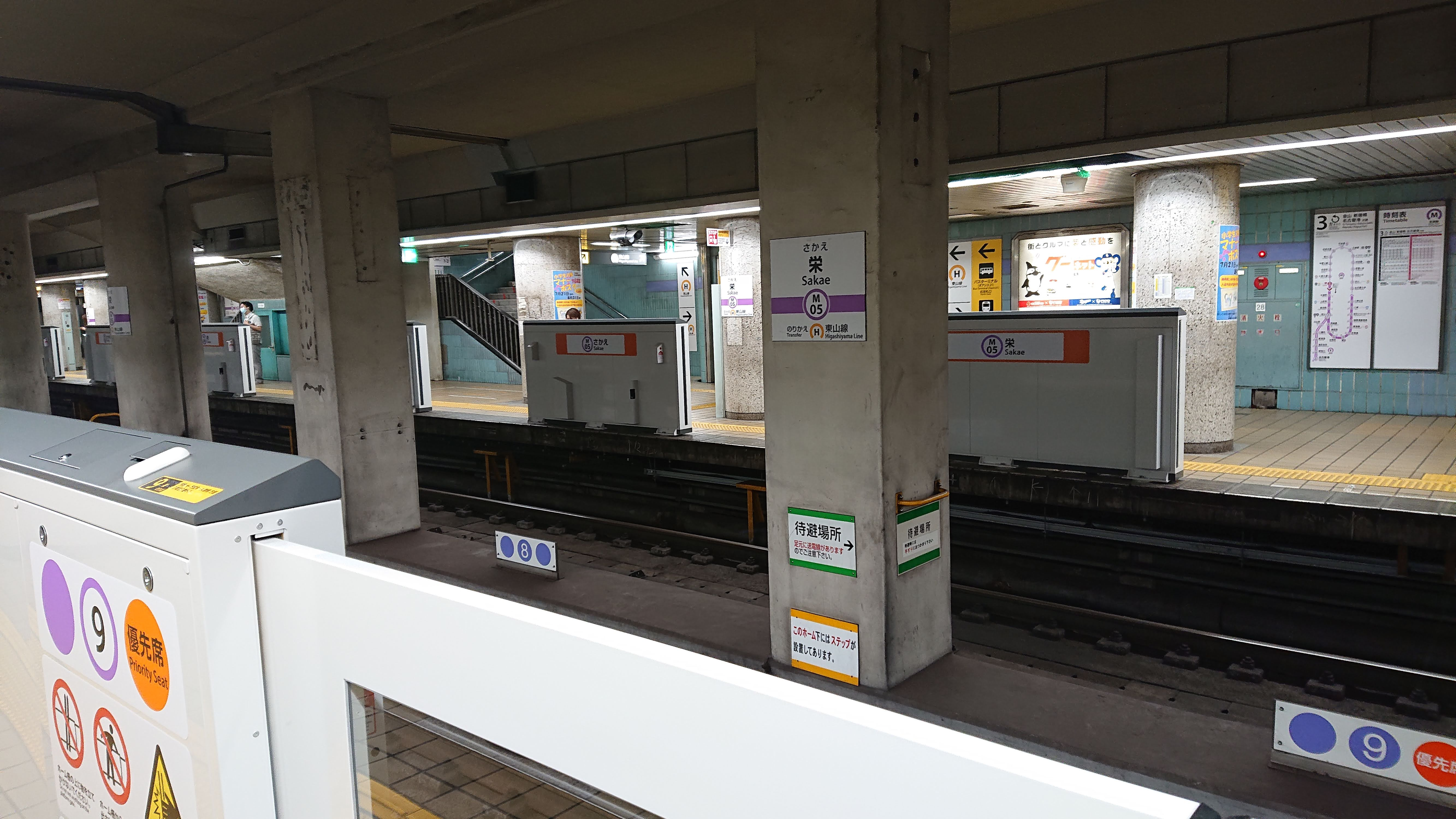
Sakae Station Meijō Line Platform

Sakae Station (栄駅, Sakae-eki) is an underground metro station located in Naka-ku, Nagoya, Aichi Prefecture, Japan operated by the Nagoya Municipal Subway. It is an interchange station between the Higashiyama Line and the Meijō Line and is located 9.0 rail kilometers from the terminus of the Higashiyama Line at Takabata Station and 3.0 rail kilometers from the terminus of the Meijō Line at Kanayama Station.

The station is connected underground with Hisaya-ōdōri Station (on the subway Meijō Line and Sakura-dōri Line) and with Sakaemachi Station (the terminus of the Meitetsu Seto Line).

== History ==
Sakae Station was opened on 15 November 1957 as Sakaemachi Station (栄町駅, Sakaemachi-eki) as a terminal station on the No. 1 Line, later renamed the Higashiyama Line. The new subway system replaced the electric tram which had run above ground. The No. 2 Line (later named the Meijō Line) connected to the station on 15 October 1965. The station was renamed to its present name on 1 June 1966.

== Lines ==
- Nagoya Municipal Subway
  - Higashiyama Line (Station number: H10)
  - Meijō Line (Station number: M05)

== Layout ==
Sakae Station has one underground island platform for use by the Higashiyama Line and two underground opposed side platforms for use by the Meijō Line.

=== Platforms ===
1	■ Higashiyama Line	For Higashiyama Kōen and Fujigaoka
2	■ Higashiyama Line	For Nagoya and Takabata
3	■ Meijō Line	For Kanayama, Aratama-bashi, and Nagoyakō
4	■ Meijō Line	For Nagoyajo and Ōzone

The station is rather large and contains many businesses such as restaurants and shops. There are three sets of gates corresponding to three exits: the Central Exit, the East Exit, and the West Exit. Past the West Exit are exits 1, 2, 7, and 8. Exit 3 and Exit 6 are between the Central Exit and the West Exit. Past the East Exit are exits 4, 4A, and 5.
