= Nishi-ku, Nagoya =

Ward of Nagoya in Chūbu, Japan

Nishi 西区
- Ward
- Nishi Ward
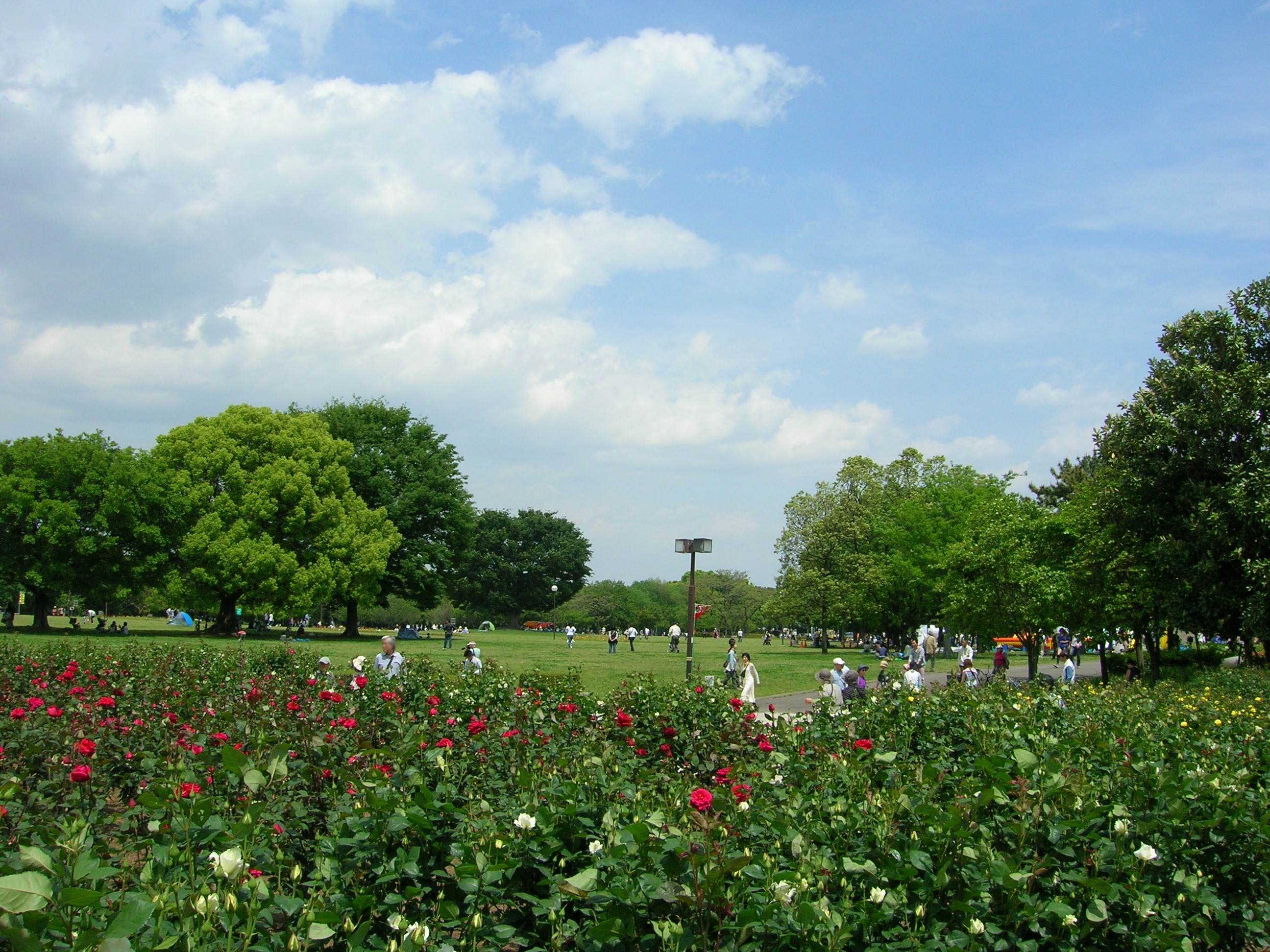
- Shōnai Greens

- Flag

- Location in Aichi Prefecture

- Location in Japan
- Coordinates: 35°11′8″N 136°53′9″E
- Country: Japan
- Region: Chūbu region Tōkai region
- Prefecture: Aichi

Area
  - Total: 17.93 km^{2} (6.92 sq mi)

Population (1 October 2019)
  - Total: 150,480
  - Density: 8,393/km^{2} (21,740/sq mi)
- Time zone: UTC+09:00 (JST)
- City hall address: 愛知県名古屋市西区花の木二丁目18番1号; 451-8508
- Website: city.nagoya.jp/nishi/ (in Japanese)
- Symbols
- Flower: Primrose
- Tree: Willow

Nishi-ku (Japanese: 西区, Hepburn: Nishi-ku; lit. "western ward") is one of the 16 wards of Nagoya, Japan. As of 1 October 2019, it has an estimated population of 150,480 and a population density of 8,393 persons per km^{2}. The total area is 17.93 km^{2}.

== Overview ==
Established in its current form in 1908, Nishi-ku is located in the northwestern part of Nagoya. Its official tree is the willow and its official flower is the primrose. The Hori, Shin, and Shōnai rivers all run through the ward. It is served by the Kami-Otai and Sakō train stations via the Meitetsu Inuyama, Meitetsu Nagoya Main, and Tsurumai railway lines.

The small historical street Shike-michi was used by merchants during the Edo period, and is now registered as a Cultural Property. A fire in 1700 destroyed a large number of the merchants' houses, as well as 15 Buddhist temples and Shinto shrines in Nagoya; as a result, Tokugawa Yoshimichi widened Shike-michi. Warehouses were constructed with plaster walls on the east side as a protection against future fires. It took around 40 years to complete the whole area. Most houses that are standing in Shike-michi date to 1740.

Popular destinations in Nishi-ku include the Noritake Garden and museum, Shōnai Greens park, the Endoji Shopping Arcade (where there are often-vandalized statues of famous warlords), Nagoya Lucent Tower (the sixth-tallest building in Nagoya), the Toyota Commemorative Museum of Industry and Technology, and the chashitsu tea house Fūshin-tei. The latter is part of Nagoya Castle, which can be seen from the five-star Hotel Nagoya Castle, and is registered as a Cultural Property.

Nishi-ku is believed to be the birthplace of pachinko, a gambling game which first emerged in the area as a pastime in 1930 before spreading nationwide. It is also home to the headquarters of ceramic company Noritake and food companies Marukawa and Meito Sangyo. The first KFC in Japan was opened in Nishi-ku in November 1970.

== Notable people ==
- Niwa Nagahide (1535–1585), samurai
- Sassa Narimasa (1536–1588), samurai

== Gallery ==
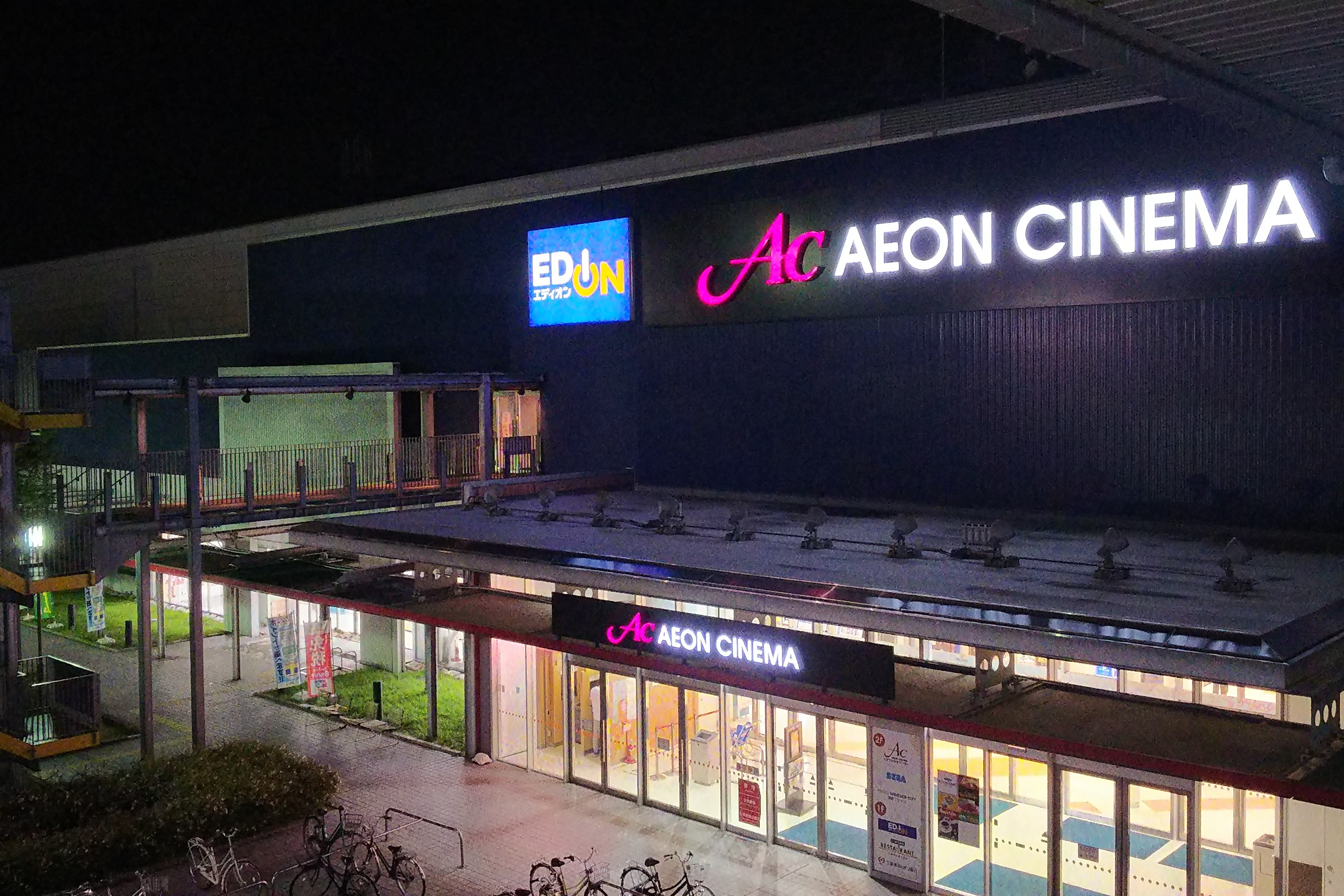
Aeon Cinema

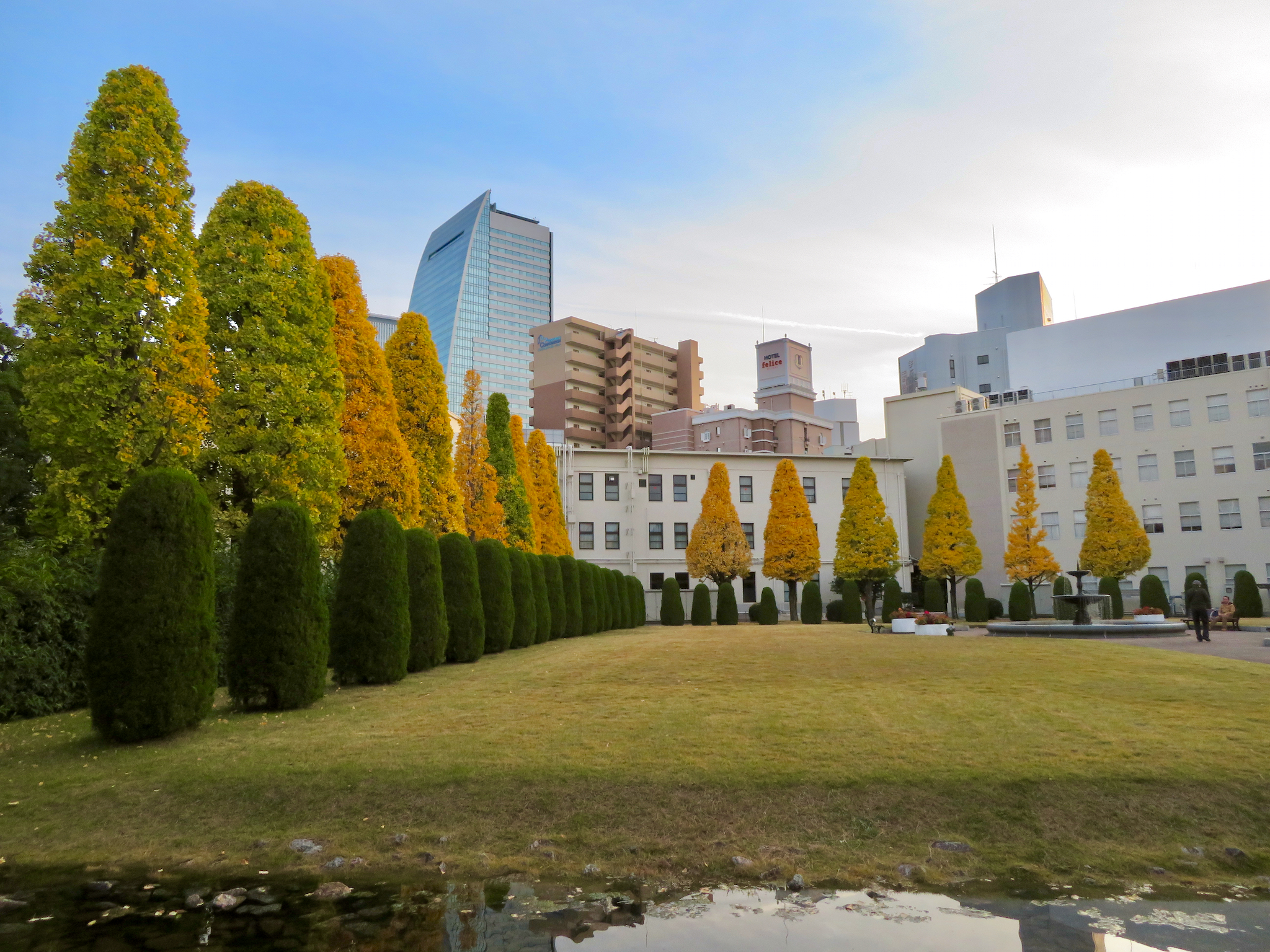
Autumn leaves in Noritake Garden

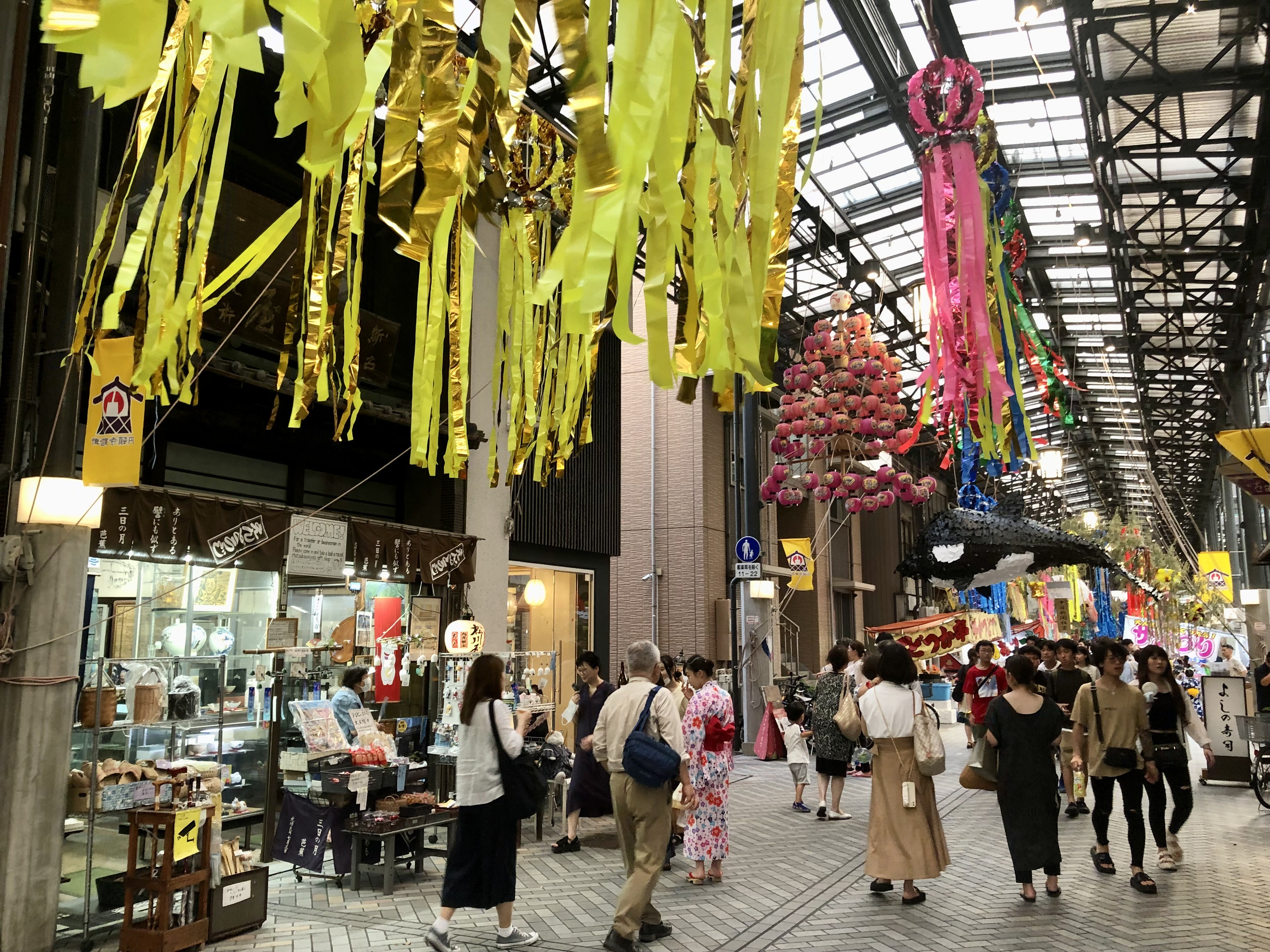
Endo-ji Shopping Arcade

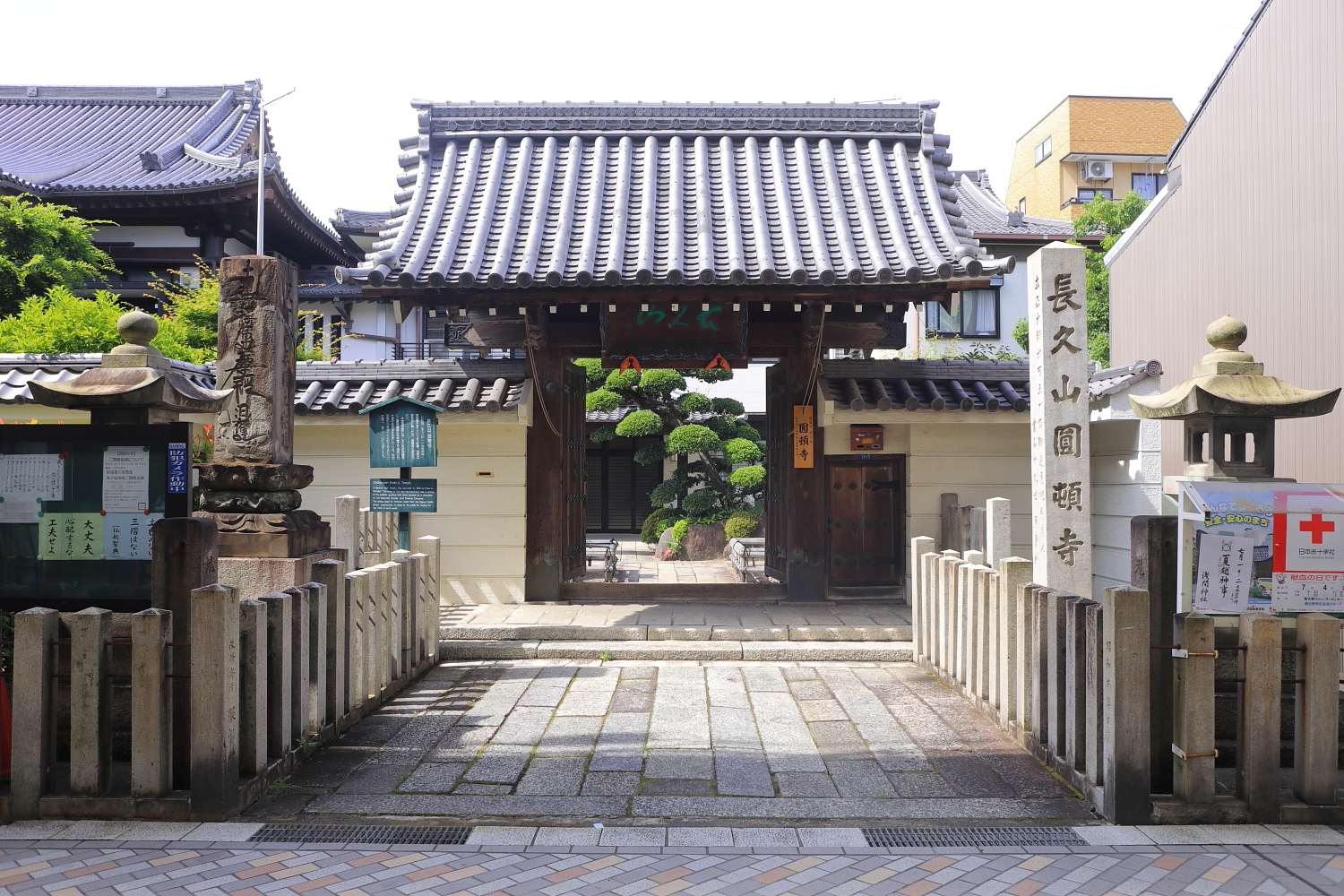
Endon-ji Temple

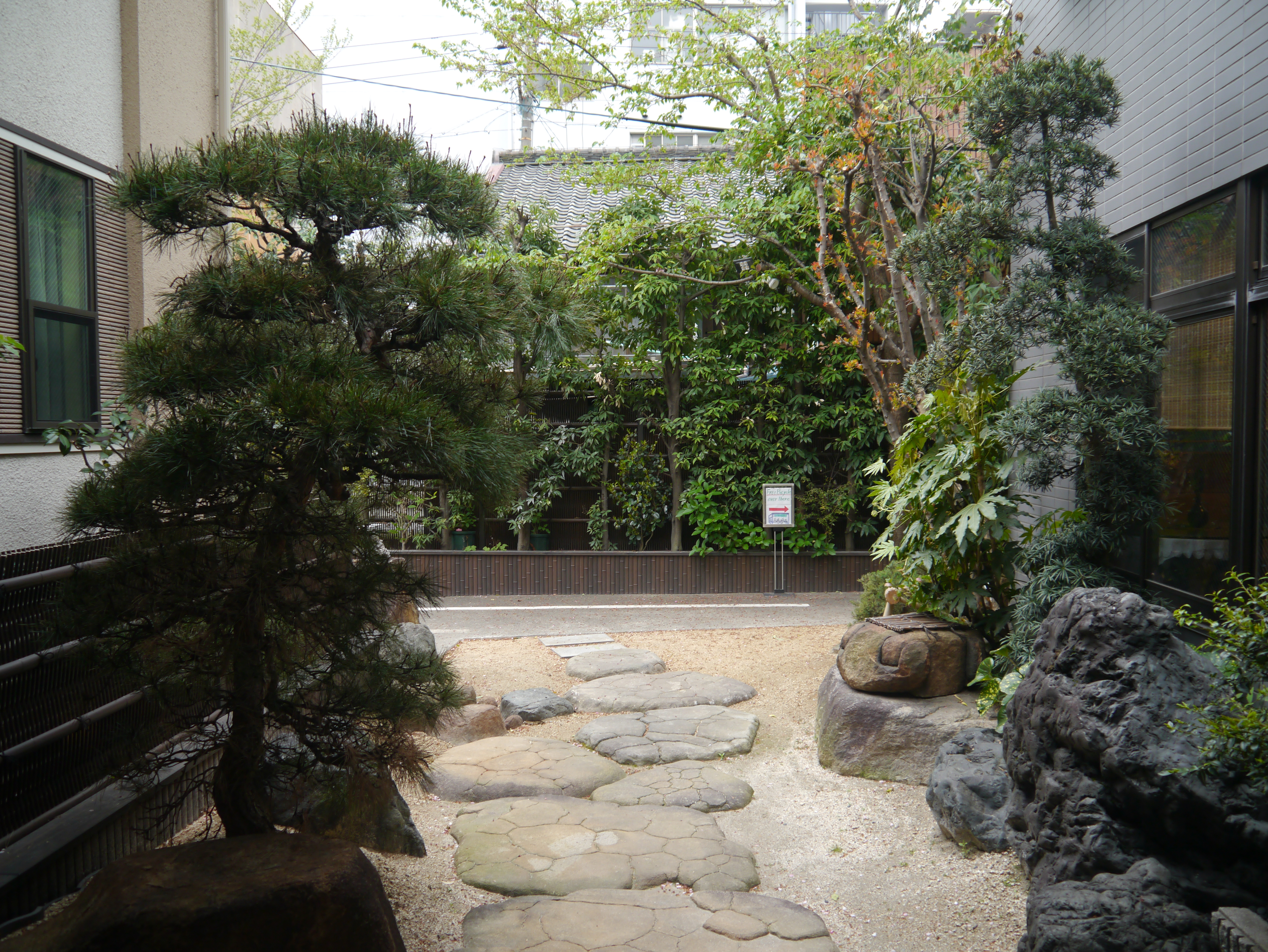
Inside Kyoya ryokan

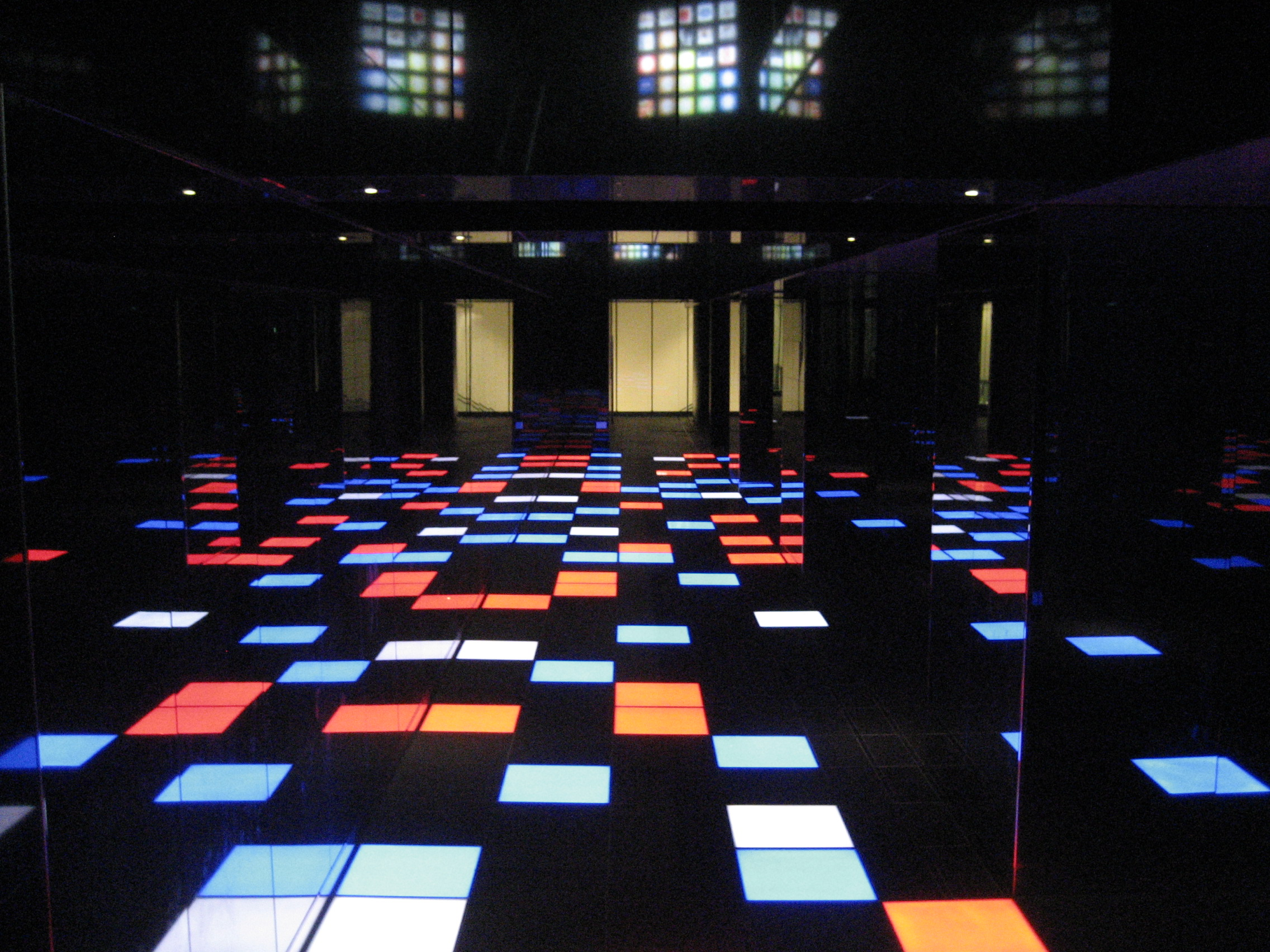
Inside Nagoya Lucent Tower

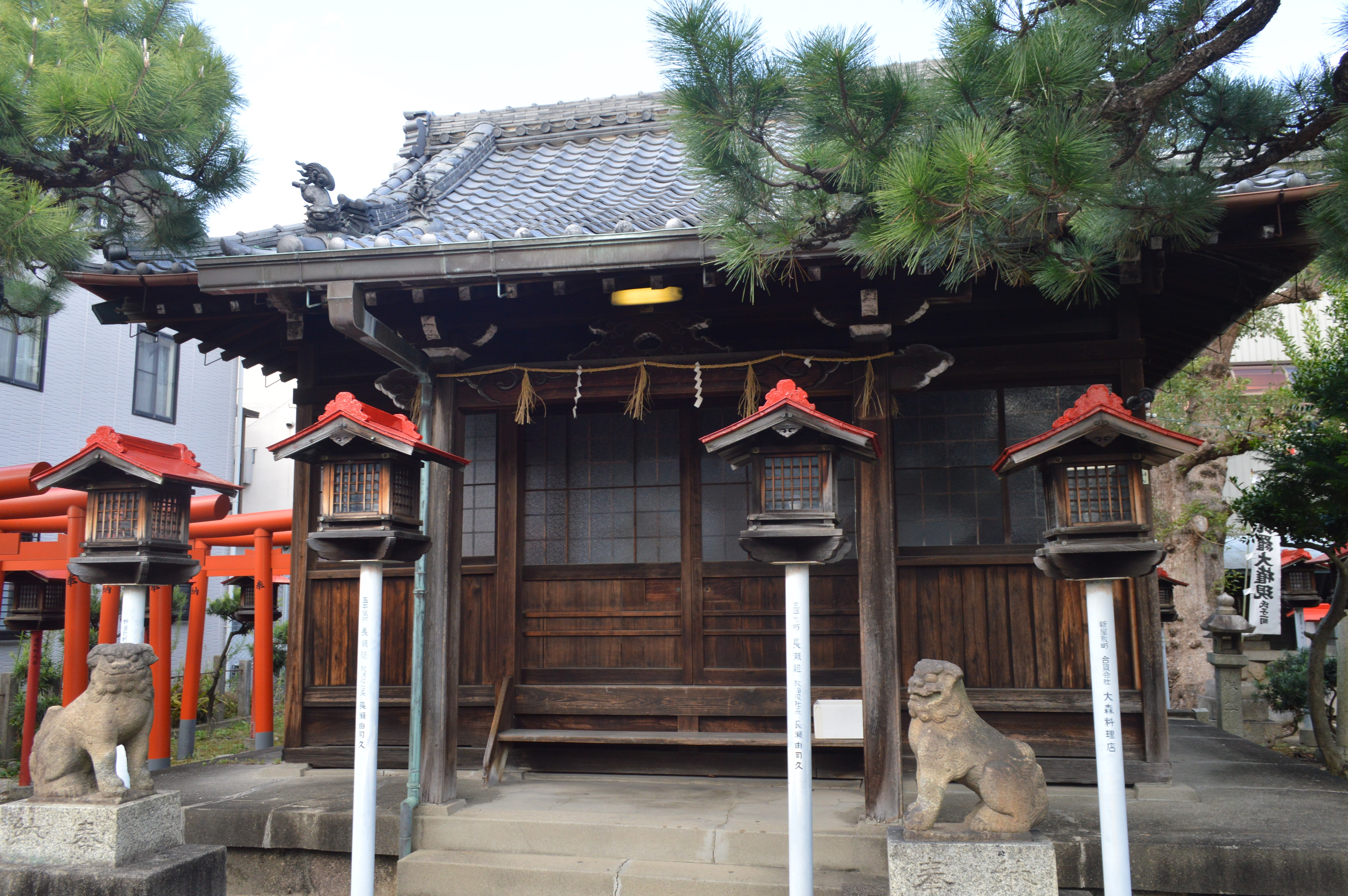
Josai Kamishuku Shrine

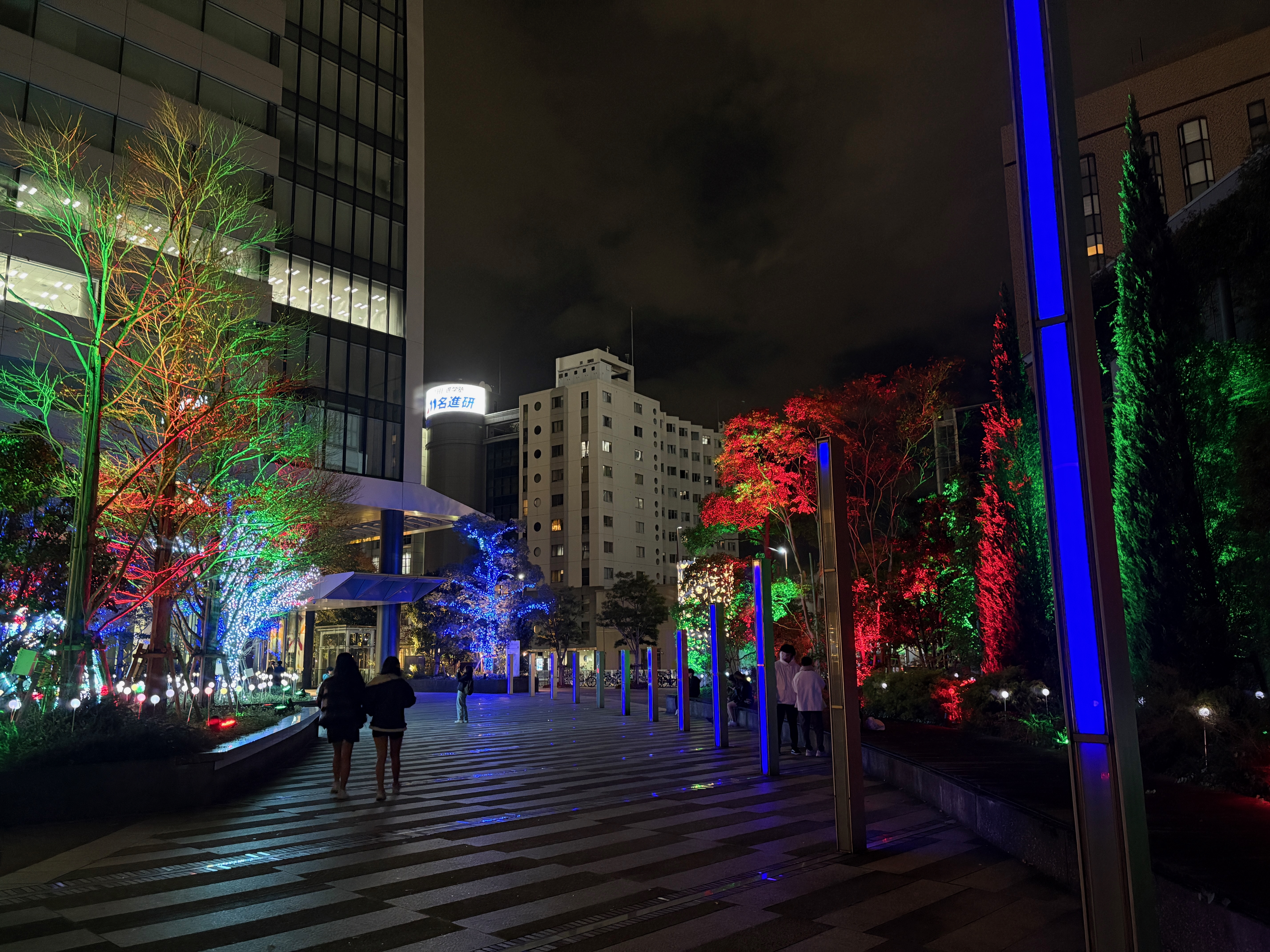
Lights in front of Nagoya Lucent Tower

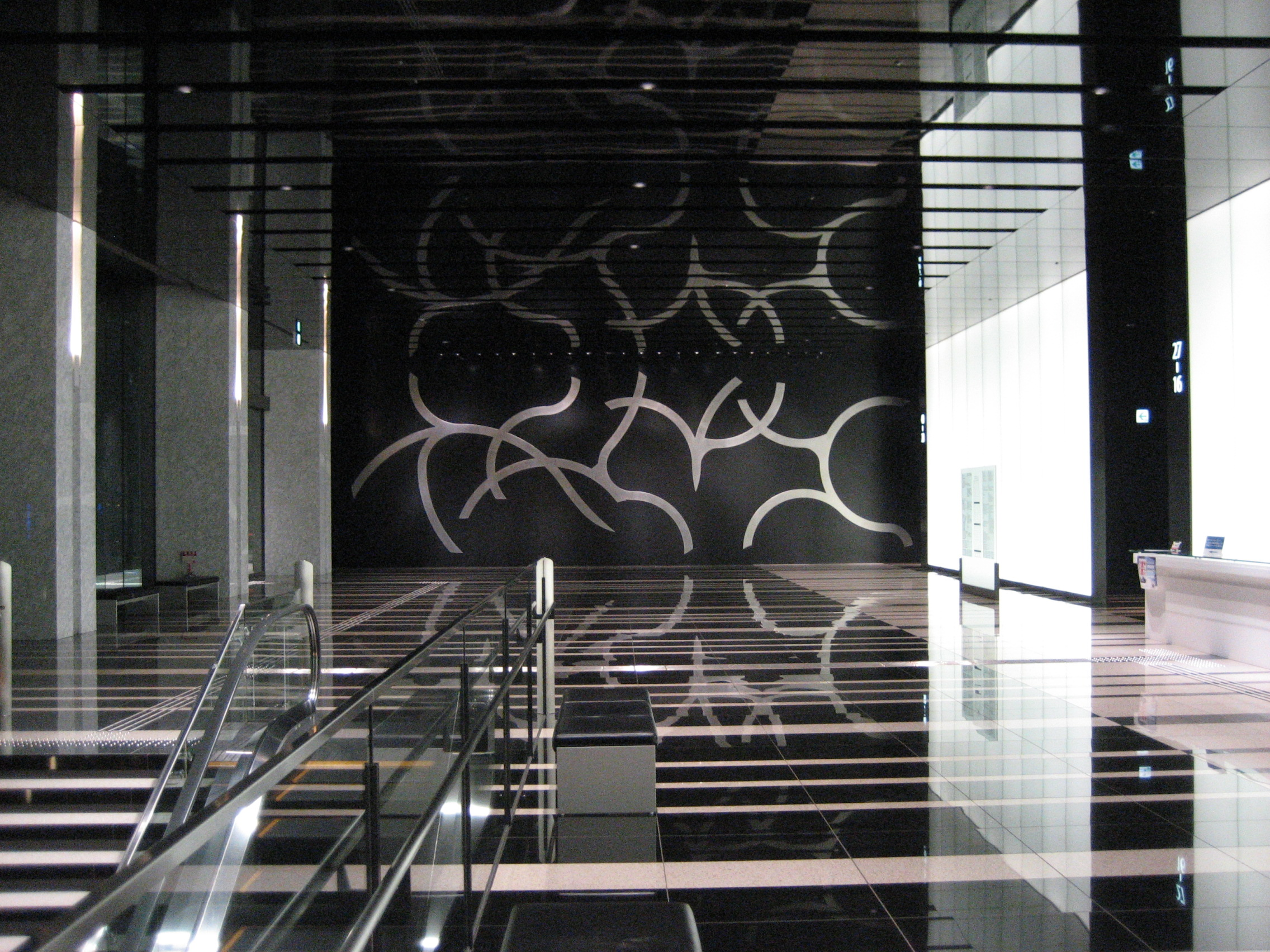
Lobby of Nagoya Lucent Tower

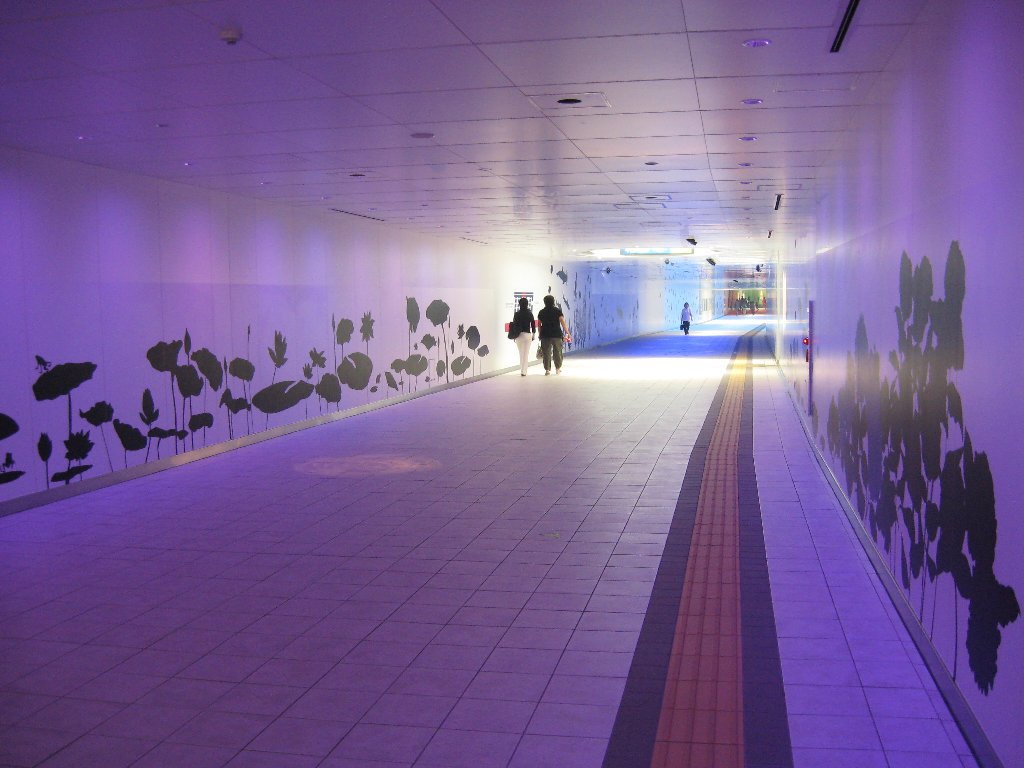
Lucent Avenue underpass

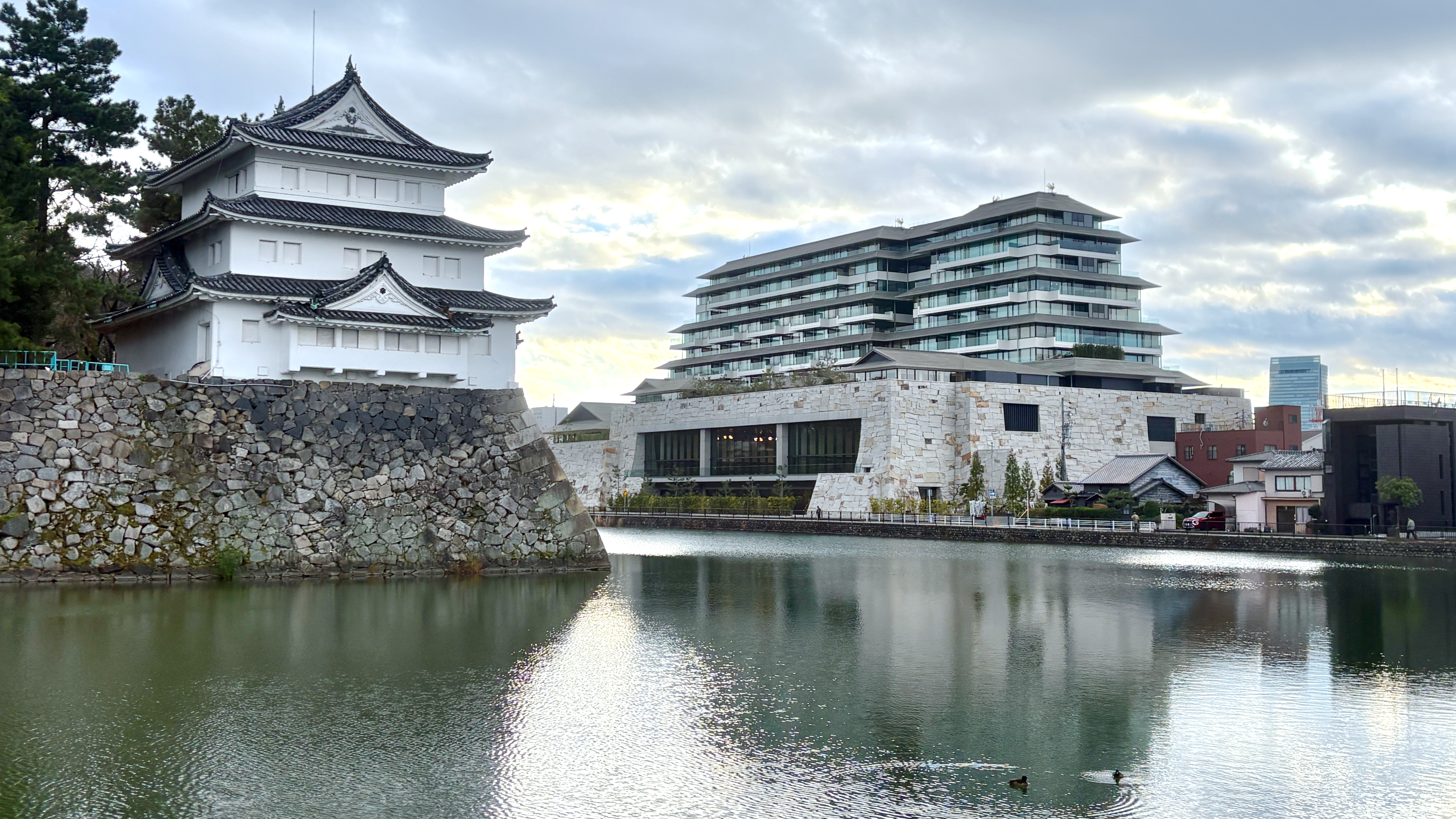
Nagoya Castle (left) and Hotel Nagoya Castle (right)

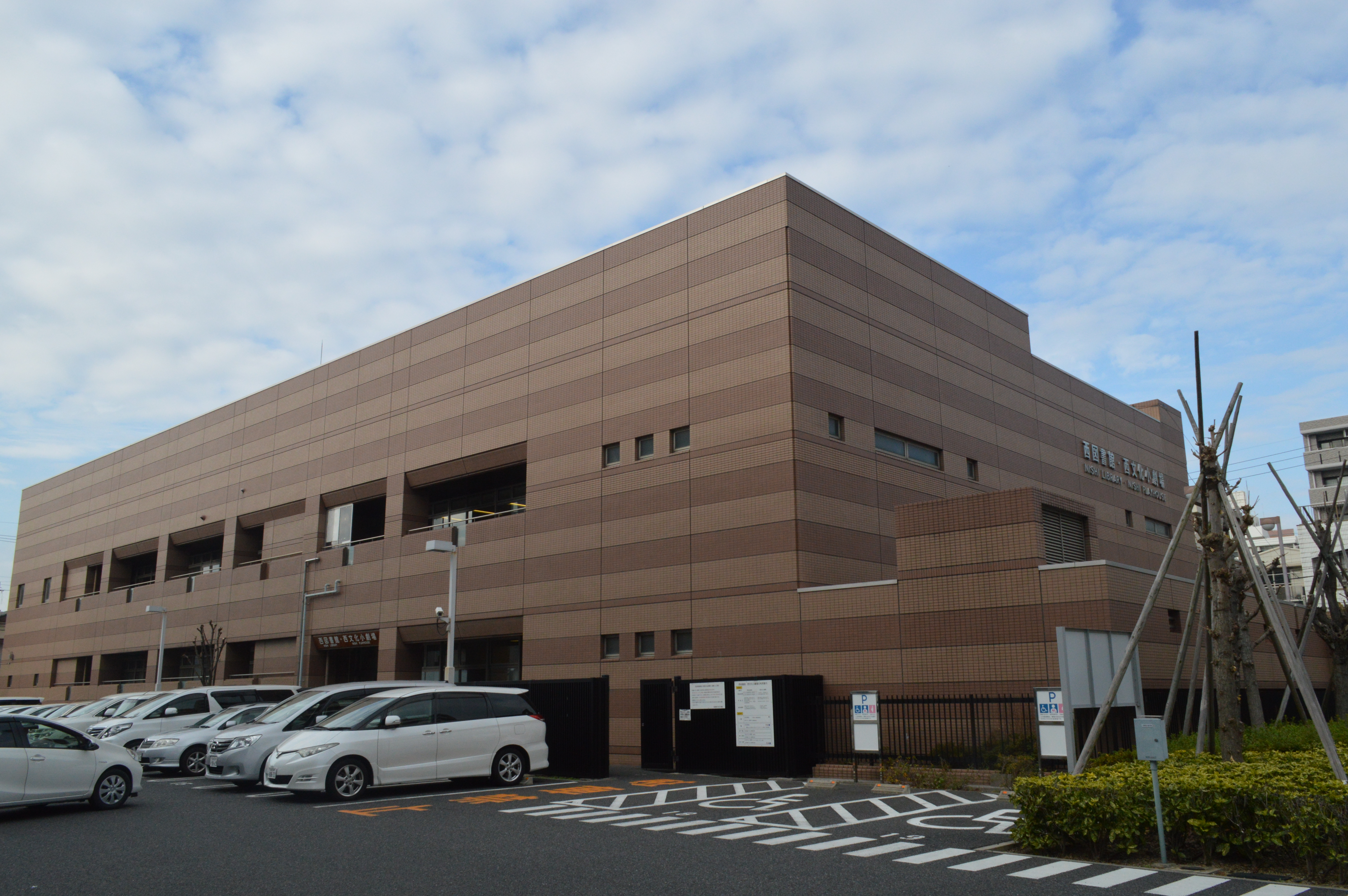
Nagoya Nishi Library

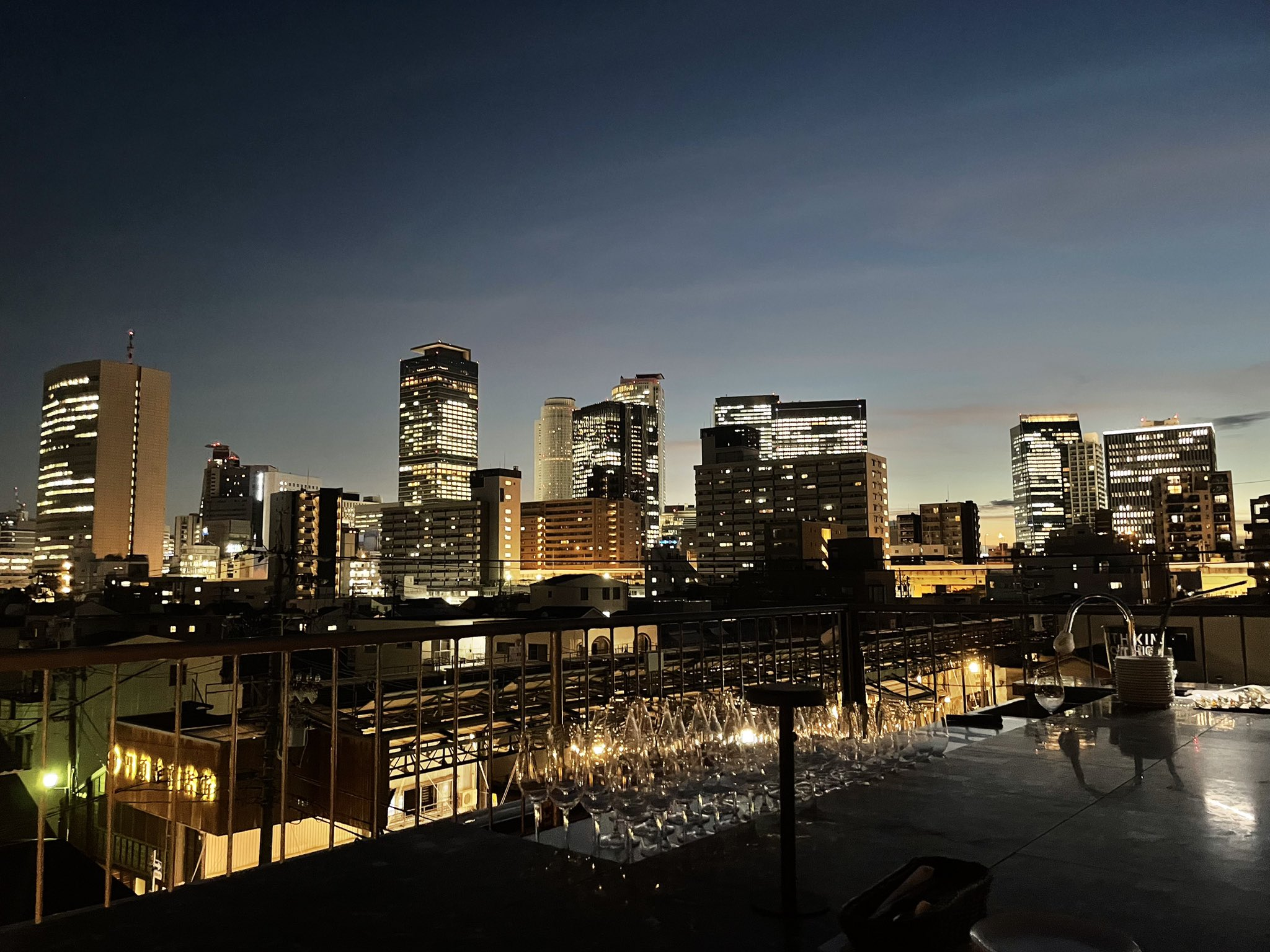
Nagoya skyline viewed from Nishi-ku

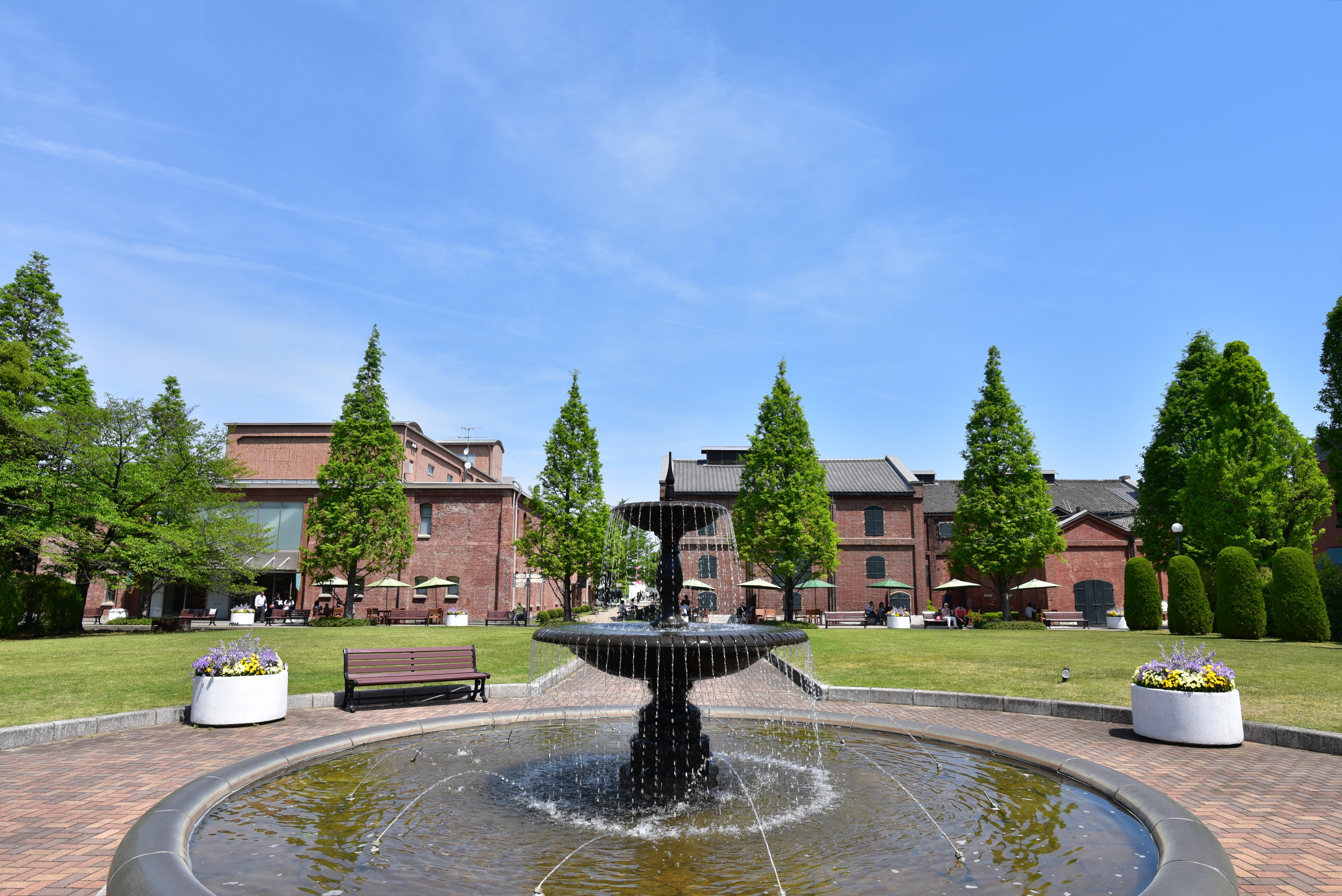
Noritake Garden

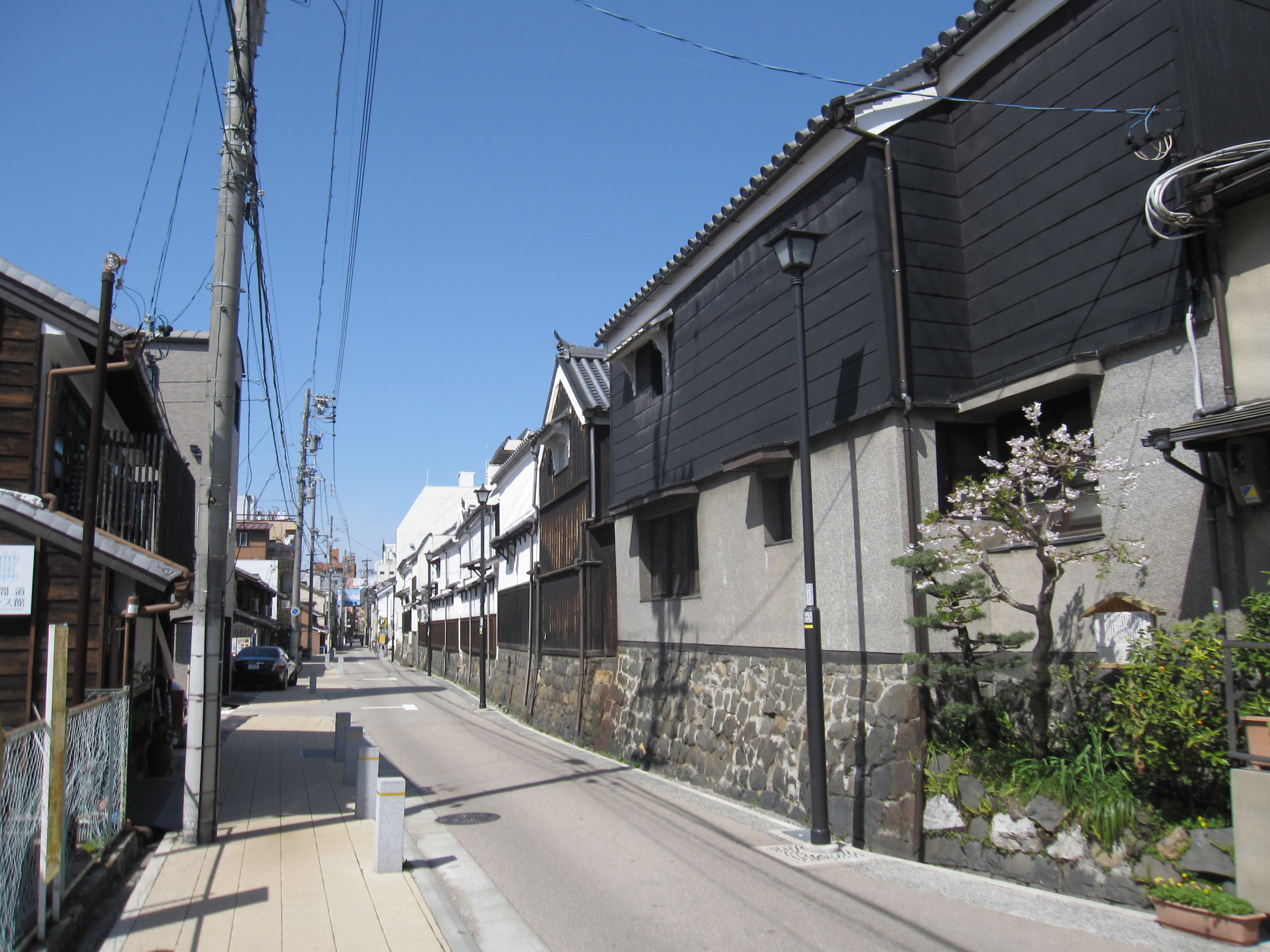
Shike-michi

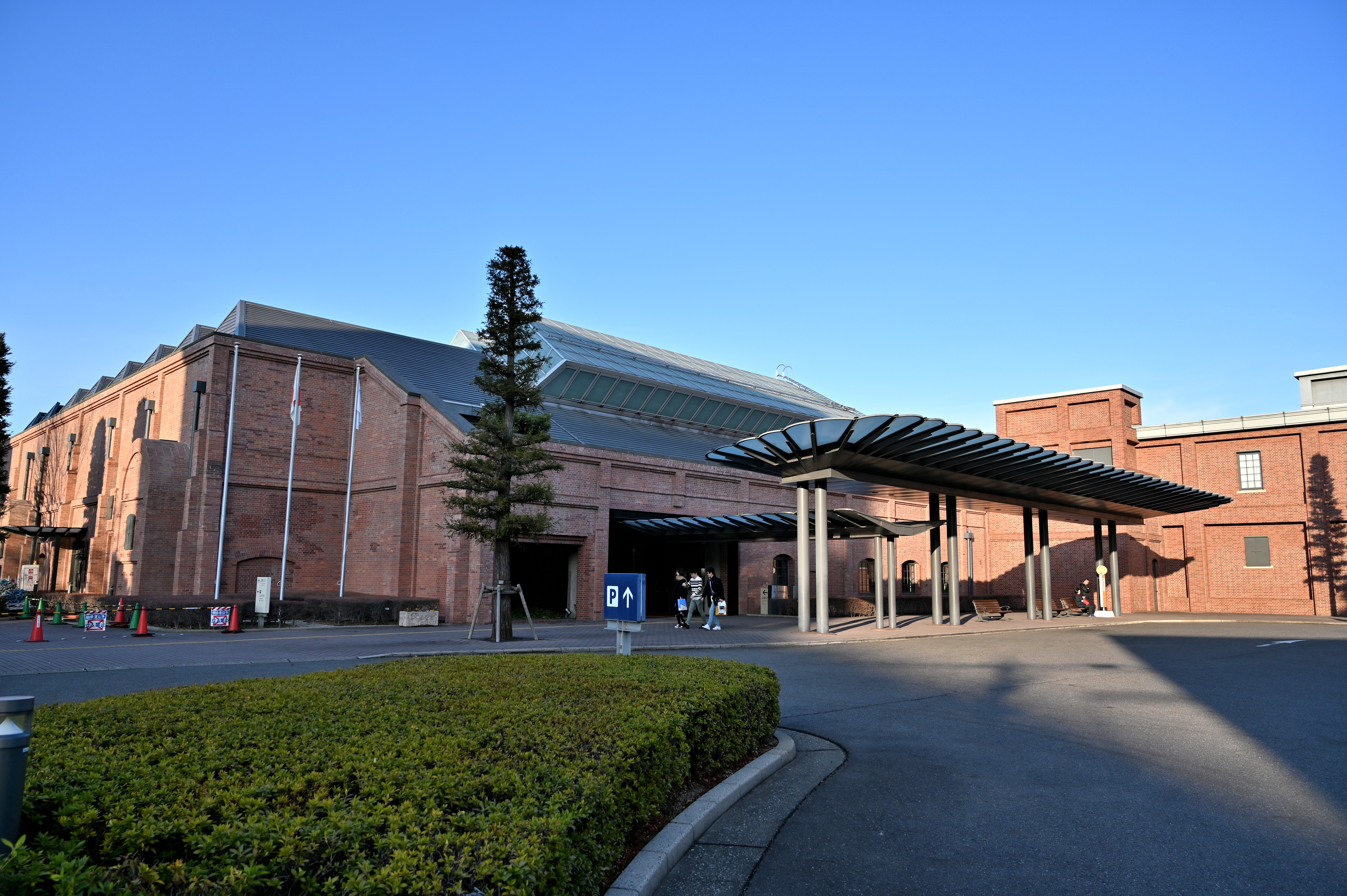
Toyota Commemorative Museum of Industry and Technology
