= Marukawa =

Japanese confectionery manufacturer

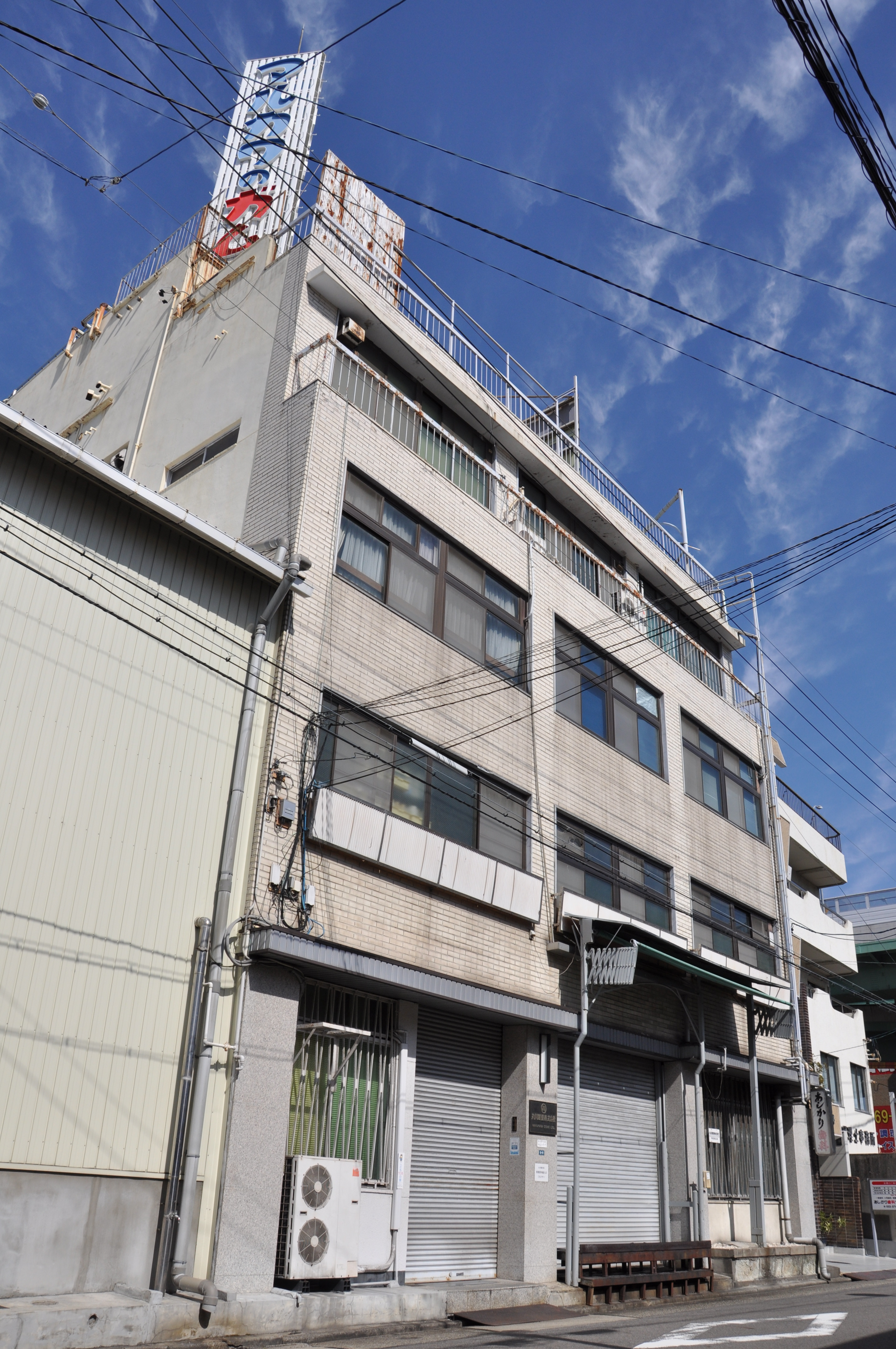
Marukawa head office

Marukawa Confectionery Co., Ltd. (丸川製菓株式会社, Marukawa Seika Kabushiki Kaisha) is a Japanese manufacturer of confectioneries. Its head office is in Nishi-ku, Nagoya.

== About ==
Marukawa was founded in 1888, however, it was established under its current name in 1948. It is a major international company in the field of Bubble Gum.

In addition to manufacturing and selling Marukawa brand bubble gums for over half a century, it also manufactures private brand bubble gums according to the customers' requirements. The company's capital stands at JP¥75,000,000. Its main banks are The Bank of Tokyo-Mitsubishi UFJ,. Ltd., and Mizuho Bank Ltd.

== Timeline ==
- 1888 - Started making confectionery
- 1947 - Started manufacturing Bubble Gum
- 1948 - Established Marukawa Conf. Co., Ltd.
- 1957 - Started trading throughout the world
