= Endoji Shopping Arcade Statues =

Japanese statues

- Endōji Shōtengai-zōi (円頓寺商店街)
- Statue of Tokugawa Mitsukuni, also known as Mito Kōmon

- Location within Nagoya Location within Aichi Prefecture Location within Japan
- Interactive map of Endoji Shopping Arcade Statues
- Location: Nishi-ku, Nagoya, Aichi Prefecture, Japan
- Coordinates: 35.1764°N 136.8900°E
- Designer: Tokita Kazuhiro
- Type: Statues
- Material: Reinforced plastic
- Height: 1.5 metres (4.9 ft) (Note: Only for the statue of Oda Nobunaga)
- Opening date: July 25, 2013
- Dedicated to: Tokugawa Ieyasu; Toyotomi Hideyoshi; Oda Nobunaga; Tokugawa Mitsukuni

The Endoji Shopping Arcade Statues (Japanese: 円頓寺商店街像, Hepburn: Endōji Shōtengai-zōi), or The Three Heroes and Mito Kōmon Monument (三英傑と水戸黄門のモニュメント, San'eiketsu to Mito Kōmon no Monyumento), are statues of the famous Sengoku period warlords Tokugawa Ieyasu, Toyotomi Hideyoshi, and Oda Nobunaga located in Nagoya, Japan. There is also a statue of Tokugawa Mitsukuni, the grandson of Tokugawa Ieyasu. The statues are often subject to vandalism.

== Description ==
Tokugawa Ieyasu, Toyotomi Hideyoshi, and Oda Nobunaga are considered to be "Japan's most famous warlords". They are noted as the ones that unified Japan during the Sengoku period in the 16th century. The three are known as the "Three Heroes" (三英傑, San'eiketsu). They are believed to have been born in now-Nagoya, Aichi Prefecture. Tokugawa Mitsukuni (also known as Mito Kōmon), the grandson of Tokugawa Ieyasu, was born in now Mito, Ibaraki and was the lord of Mito domain.

The statues are located at the Endoji intersection at the entrance of the Endoji Shopping Arcade, Nishi-ku in Nagoya, Aichi Prefecture. It was made of reinforced plastic. It was designed by Tokita Kazuhiro in 2013, who commissioned the Nihonbijutsu Training School to build the monument. It was completed after three months, and an unveiling ceremony was held on July 25, 2013. The statue of Oda Nobunaga is located at the northeast corner of the intersection. It is approximately 1.5 metres (4.9 ft) tall. He is painted gold and is depicted as standing and holding a gun. The statue of Toyotomi Hideyoshi is located at the southeast corner of the intersection. He is painted silver and is depicted as sitting. The statue of Tokugawa Ieyasu is located at the northwest corner of the intersection. He was painted bronze and was depicted as sitting and resting his chin on his hand. The statue of Tokugawa Mitsukuni is located at the southwest corner of the intersection. He is painted in full color. Even though Tokugawa Mitsukuni was not a warlord and was not from Nagoya, he is added as Kazuhiro liked him.

Between 2015 and 2016, the scepter of the Toyotomi Hideyoshi statue was broken. In 2019, the statue of Oda Nobunaga was found without his left arm. In June 2022, the walking stick of Tokugawa Mitsukuni was broken. On October 31, a passerby noticed that the statue of Tokugawa Ieyasu was toppled. It was later removed and was restored in February 2023. On August 25, 2025, the statue of Toyotomi Hideyoshi was found without a head. It was temporarily repaired with duct tape. It was fixed on December 28.
