= Shōnai Greens =

Park in Japan

Coordinates: 35°12′33″N 136°52′56″E

- 庄内緑地 (Shōnai ryokuchi)
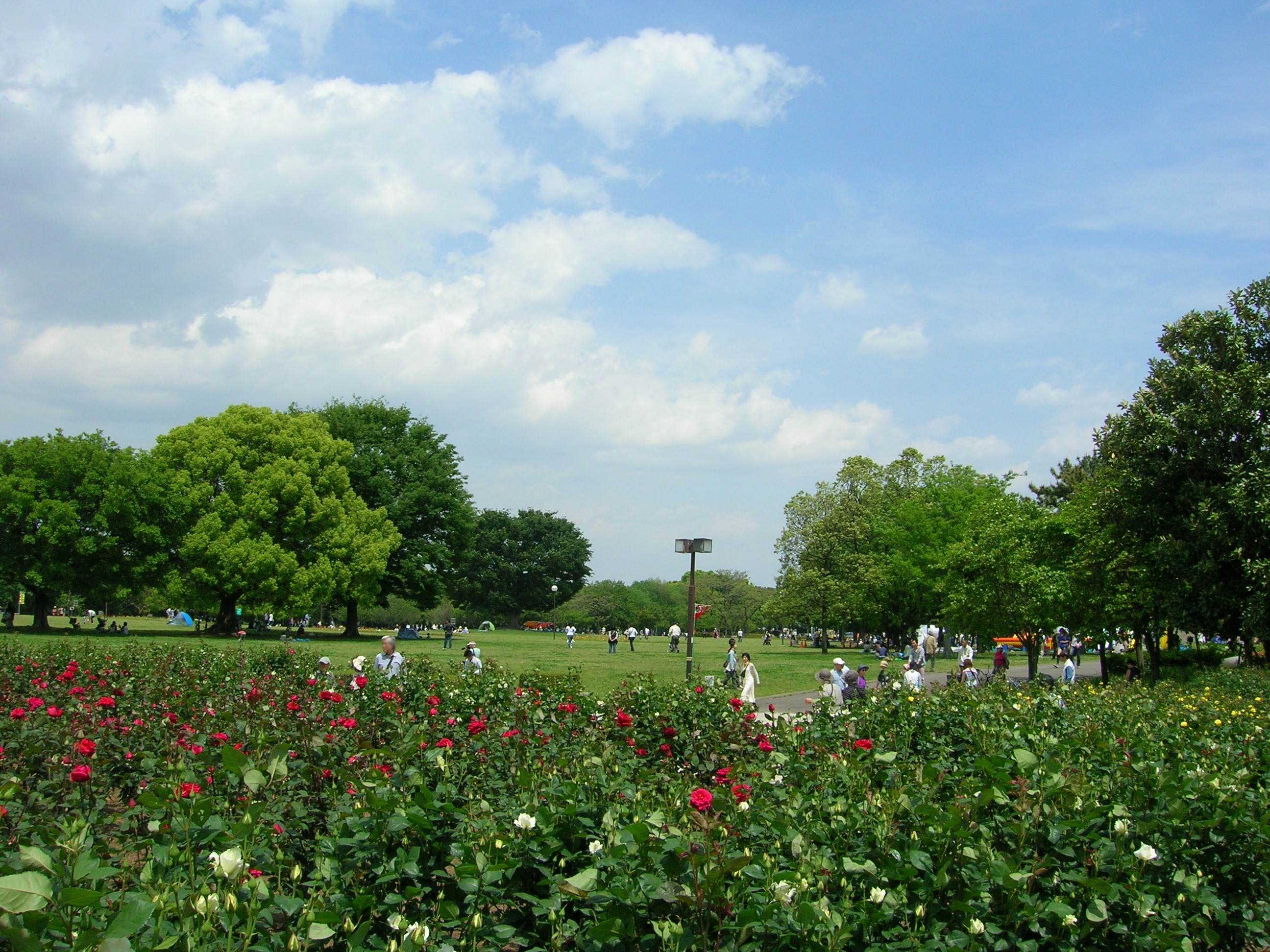
- Shōnai Greens in May 2011
- Interactive map of Shōnai Greens
- Location: Nishi-ku, Nagoya, Aichi, Japan

The Shōnai Greens (庄内 緑地, Shōnai ryokuchi), also known as Shōnai Park, are located in Nishi-ku, Nagoya in central Japan. The park is constructed around the Otai retention basin of the Shōnai River, which passes by south of the park.

Access by public transport is by Shōnai Ryokuchi Kōen Station on the Tsurumai Line.
