= Nagoya Lucent Tower =

Building in Nagoya, Japan

Coordinates: 35°10′31″N 136°52′52″E

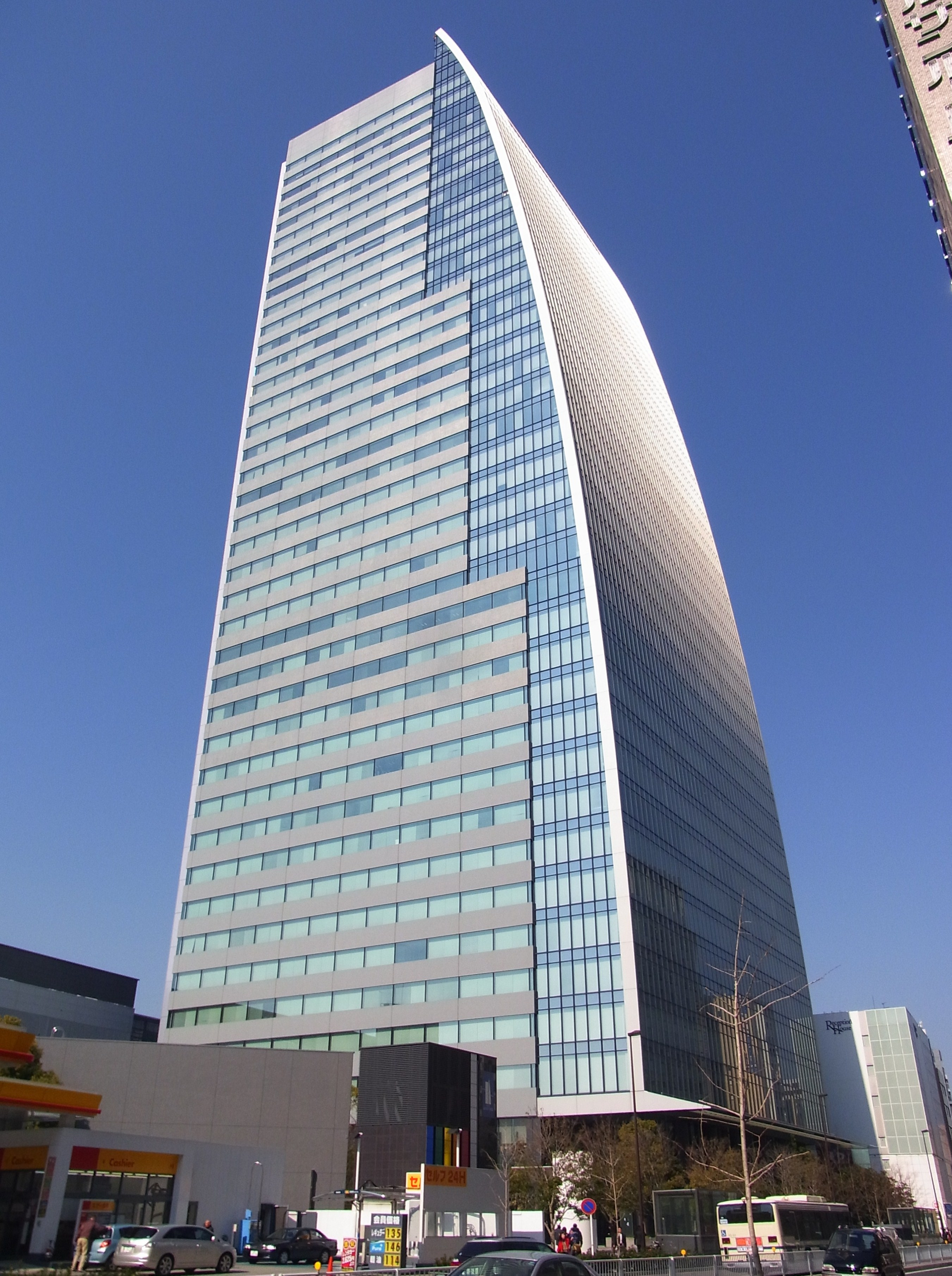
Nagoya Lucent Tower

Nagoya Lucent Tower is a 180-metre, 40-story skyscraper located Nishi-ku, Nagoya, Aichi, Japan. As of 2010, it was Japan's 49th tallest structure.

It is one of the tallest buildings in Nagoya.
