= Noritake =

Japanese tableware and technology company

Noritake Co., Limited

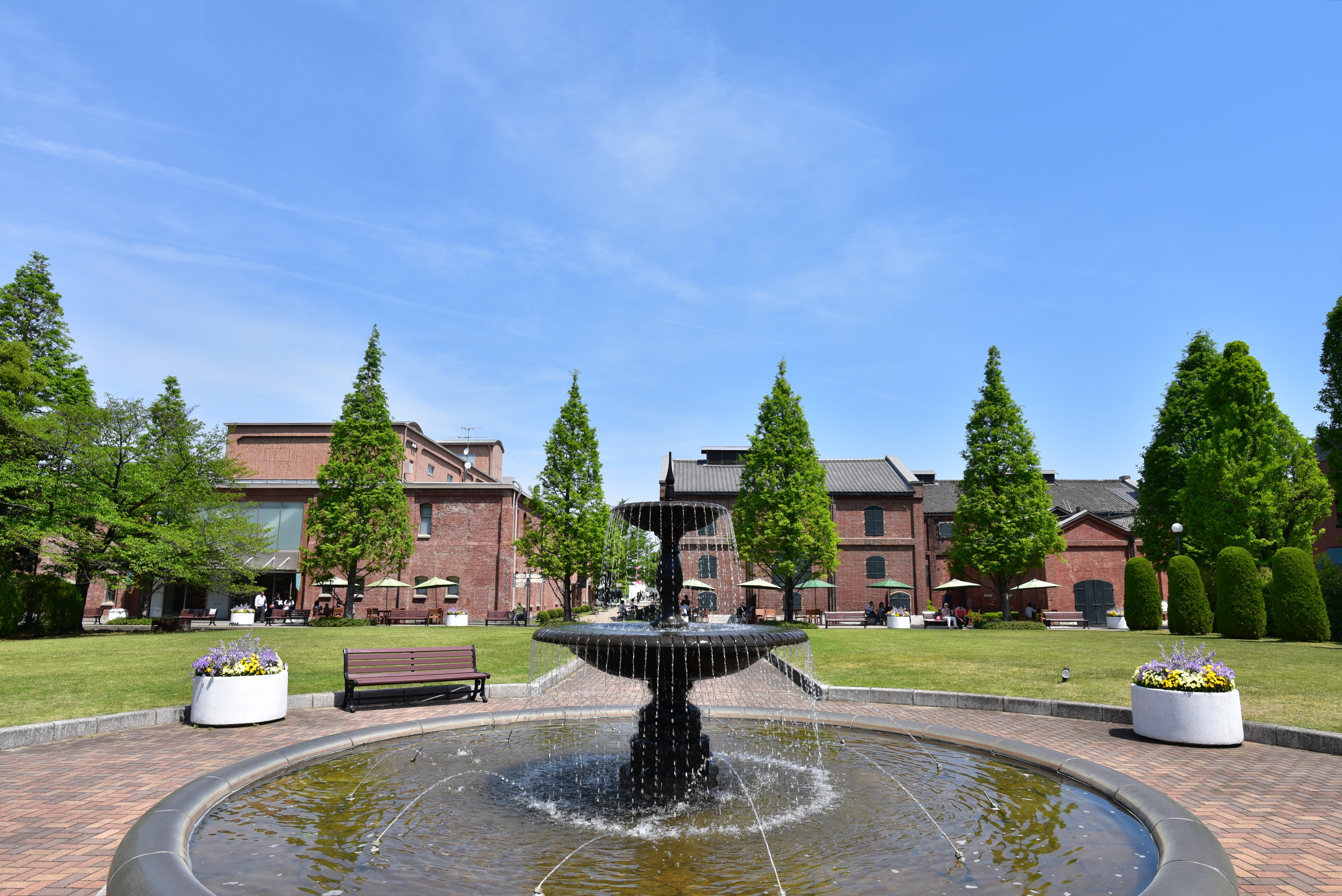
- Noritake factory in Nagoya
- Native name: ノリタケ株式会社
- Formerly: Nippon Toki Gomei Kaisha (1904–1981)
- Type: Public KK
- Traded as: TYO: 5331; NAG: 5331
- ISIN: JP3763000001
- Industry: Glass & ceramics
- Founded: 4 January 1904; 122 years ago as Nippon Toki Gomei Kaisha
- Founder: Ichizaemon Morimura; Toyo Morimura
- Headquarters: Nishi-ku, Nagoya 451-8501, Japan
- Area served: Worldwide
- Key people: Hitoshi Tanemura (Chairman); Tadashi Ogura (President)
- Services: Industrial ceramic products; Ceramic tableware and decorative products; Heating furnaces; Cutting machines
- Revenue: JPY 108.8 billion (FY 2016) (US$ 1 billion) (FY 2016)
- Net income: JPY 4.1 billion (FY 2016) (US$ 37.9 million) (FY 2016)
- Number of employees: 5,097 (consolidated, as of 31 March 2017)
- Parent: Morimura Group
- Website: Official website

Noritake Co., Limited (ノリタケ株式会社, Noritake Kabushiki-gaisha) is a Japanese porcelain, fine ceramics, and sharpening stone manufacturer headquartered in Nagoya, Japan.

== History ==
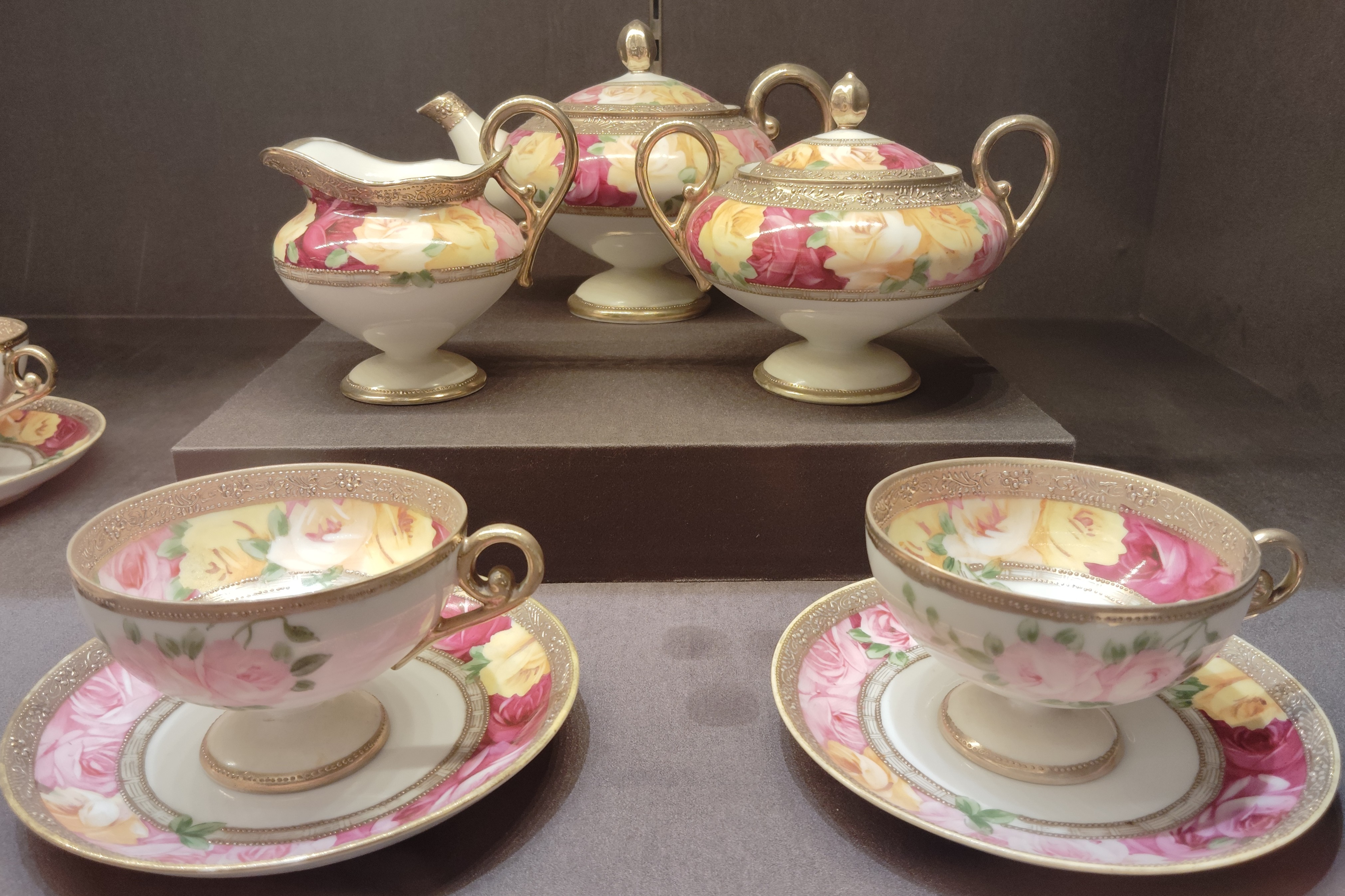
Noritake porcelain, c. 1900

In 1876, Ichizaemon Morimura VI and his brother Toyo founded Morimura Gumi with the intent of establishing overseas trading by a Japanese company. By 1878, Toyo had established a business in New York selling Japanese antiques and other goods, including pottery. The company was renamed Morimura Brothers in 1881. By the 1890s, the company had shifted from retail to wholesale operations and started working on design improvements for the pottery and porcelain ware, which had become one third of its business. By 1899, all of the pottery and porcelain decorating factories in Tokyo and Kyoto had been consolidated in Nagoya, and the company started research on creating European style hard white porcelain in Japan.

In 1904, key members of this trading company created the Nippon Toki Kaisha, Ltd. ("the Company that makes Japan's Finest China") in Japan. A new factory was built in Noritake, near Nagoya (now Noritake-shinmachi, Nishi-ku, Nagoya, Aichi). In 1914 the company succeeded in creating their first Western style dinner set, called "Sedan", to compete with European porcelain companies. Nippon Toki wares were mostly aimed at the European Market. This forerunner of the modern Noritake Company was founded in the village of Noritake, a small suburb near Nagoya, Japan. Most of the company’s early wares carried one of the various “Nippon” back stamps to indicate its country of origin when exported to Western markets. Today, many collectors agree that the best examples of “Nippon-era” (1891–1921) hand painted porcelain carry a back stamp used by "Noritake" during the Nippon era.

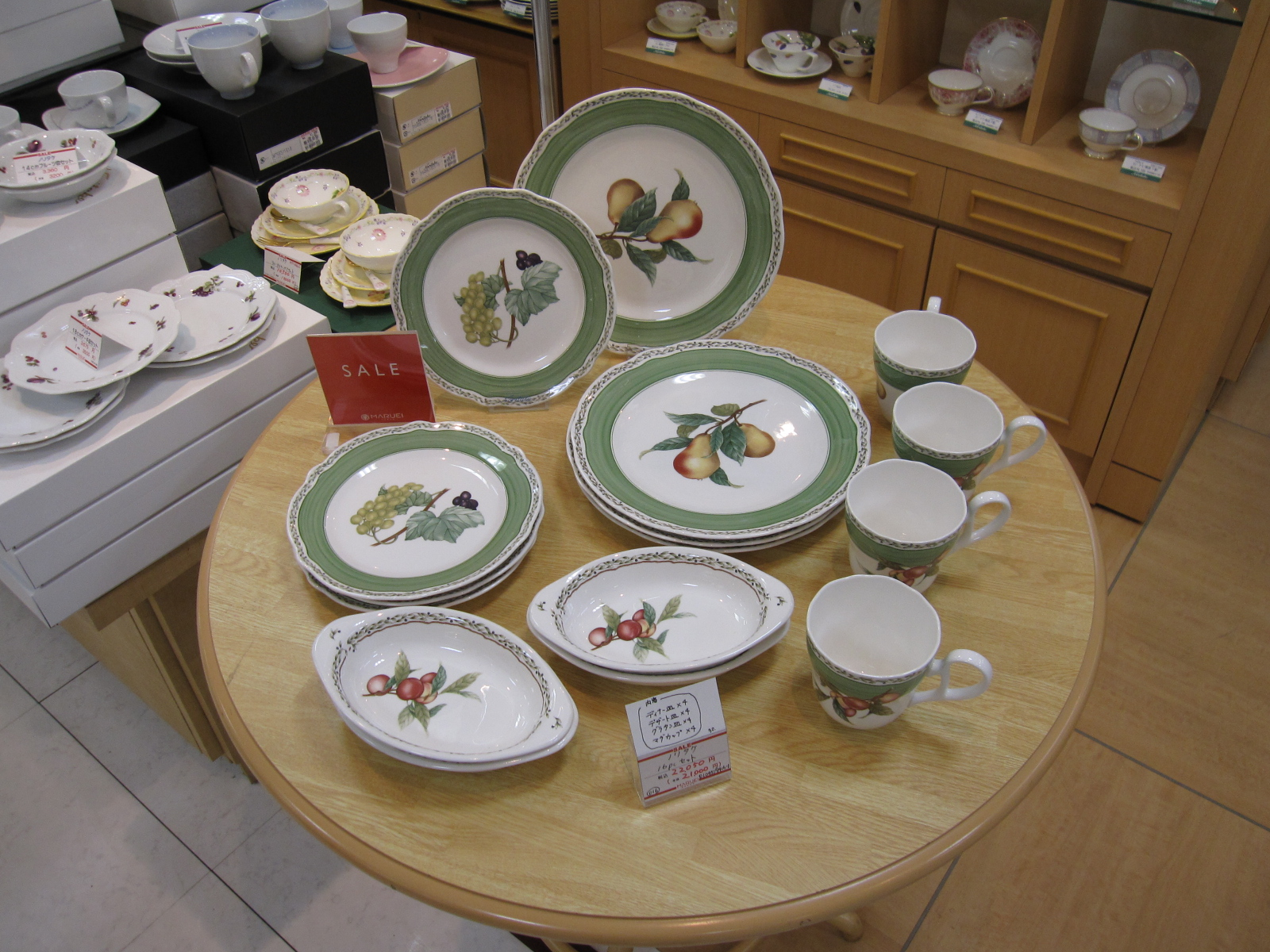
Noritake porcelain (2009)

By 1923, Nippon Toki was looking to streamline its paperwork using machines to handle large orders coming in from the United States and was impressed by the Hollerith tabulating machines manufactured by the Computing-Tabulating-Recording Company (CTR). In May 1925, Morimura-Brothers entered into a sole agency agreement with CTR (which had been renamed IBM in 1924) to import the Hollerith machines into Japan. The first Hollerith tabulator in Japan was installed at Nippon Pottery in September 1925, making Noritake IBM's first customer in Japan.

In 1939, Noritake started selling industrial grinding wheels based on its porcelain finishing technology. It now provides ceramic and diamond grinding and abrasive solutions for many industries. Other products currently manufactured by Noritake, also derived from its core tableware manufacturing technologies, include thick film circuit substrates, engineering ceramics, ceramic powder, and vacuum fluorescent displays, as well as heating furnaces and kilns, mixing technology, filtration systems, and cutting and grinding machines.

Although consumers and collectors alike have called the tableware, "Noritake" (and/or simply, "Nippon") since the late 1920s, the Japanese parent company did not officially change its name to the Noritake Co., Limited until 1981. Evidently, since Noritake is the name of a place, the company was initially prohibited from registering the name as a trade name.

The Noritake Garden in Nagoya features the production of its ceramics.

== Overseas ==
Australia

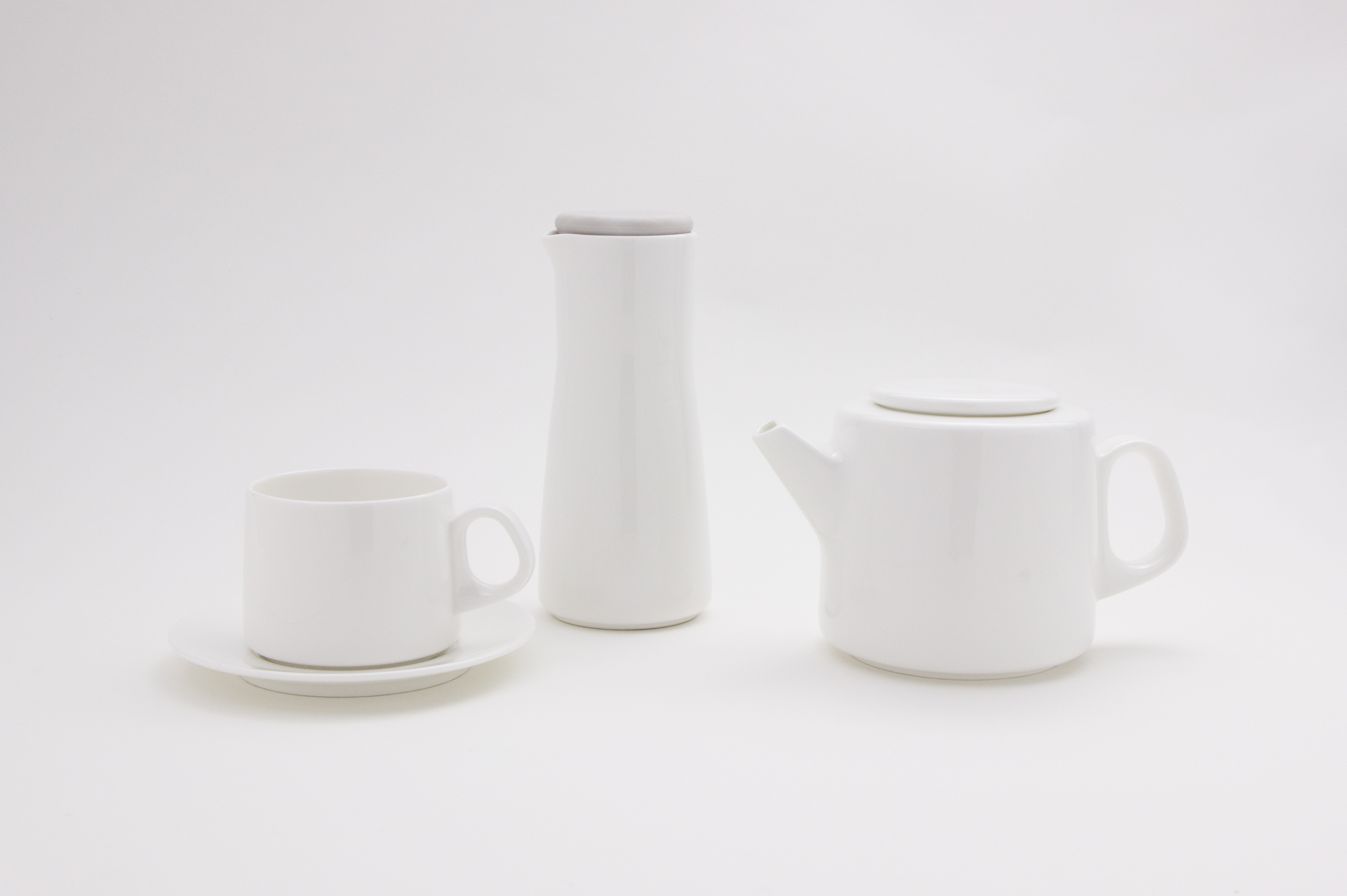
Noritake for Qantas Tableware by David Caon

Noritake Australia Pty Ltd was established in 1958, and it is owned by Noritake Co., Limited. By the late 1960s Noritake brand had become a household name. Noritake is an official supplier to Qantas Airways for in-flight and ground-based operations. The brand has worked together with the airline and Australian designers such as Marc Newson and David Caon to create a crockery range for Qantas International First and Business. A subsequent collaboration with Australian chef Adam Liaw resulted in a crockery line called "Everyday by Adam Liaw".

Noritake Australia also distributes industrial grinding wheels in the Australian market.

Sri Lanka

In 1973 Noritake constructed a factory in Sri Lanka. In 2016 this factory employed 1,200 people and exported 6 million pieces of porcelain annually.

== Literature ==
- Neff Alden, Aimee, Collector Books. Collector's Encyclopedia of Early Noritake. 1995
- Morikawa, Takahir, Maria Shobo Co., Ltd. Masterpieces of Early Noritake. 2003
- Spain, David H., Schiffer Publishing, Ltd. Noritake Collectibles A to Z.. 1995.
- Collecting Noritake A to Z, Art Deco & More, 1999
- Noritake Fancyware A to Z, 2002
- Art Deco Noritake & More, 2004
- Van Patten, Joan, Collector Books. The Collector’s Encyclopedia of Nippon Porcelain, Second Series, 1982.
- The Collector’s Encyclopedia of Noritake, 1984 (2000).
- Van Patten’s ABC’s of Collecting Nippon Porcelain, 2005.
