= Toyota Commemorative Museum of Industry and Technology =

Technology museum in Nagoya, Japan

Coordinates: 35°10′59.68″N 136°52′33.40″E

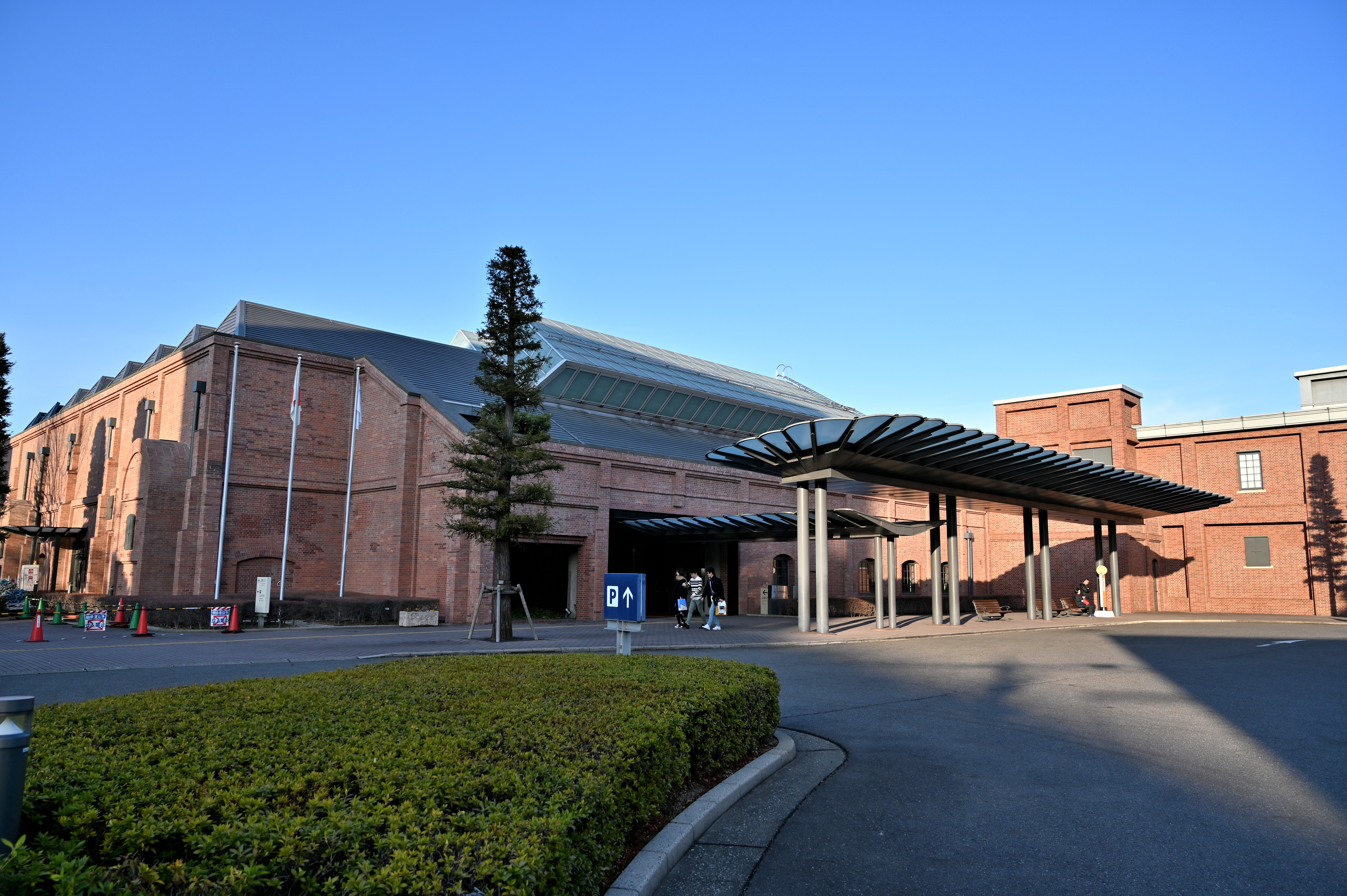
Toyota Commemorative Museum of Industry and Technology

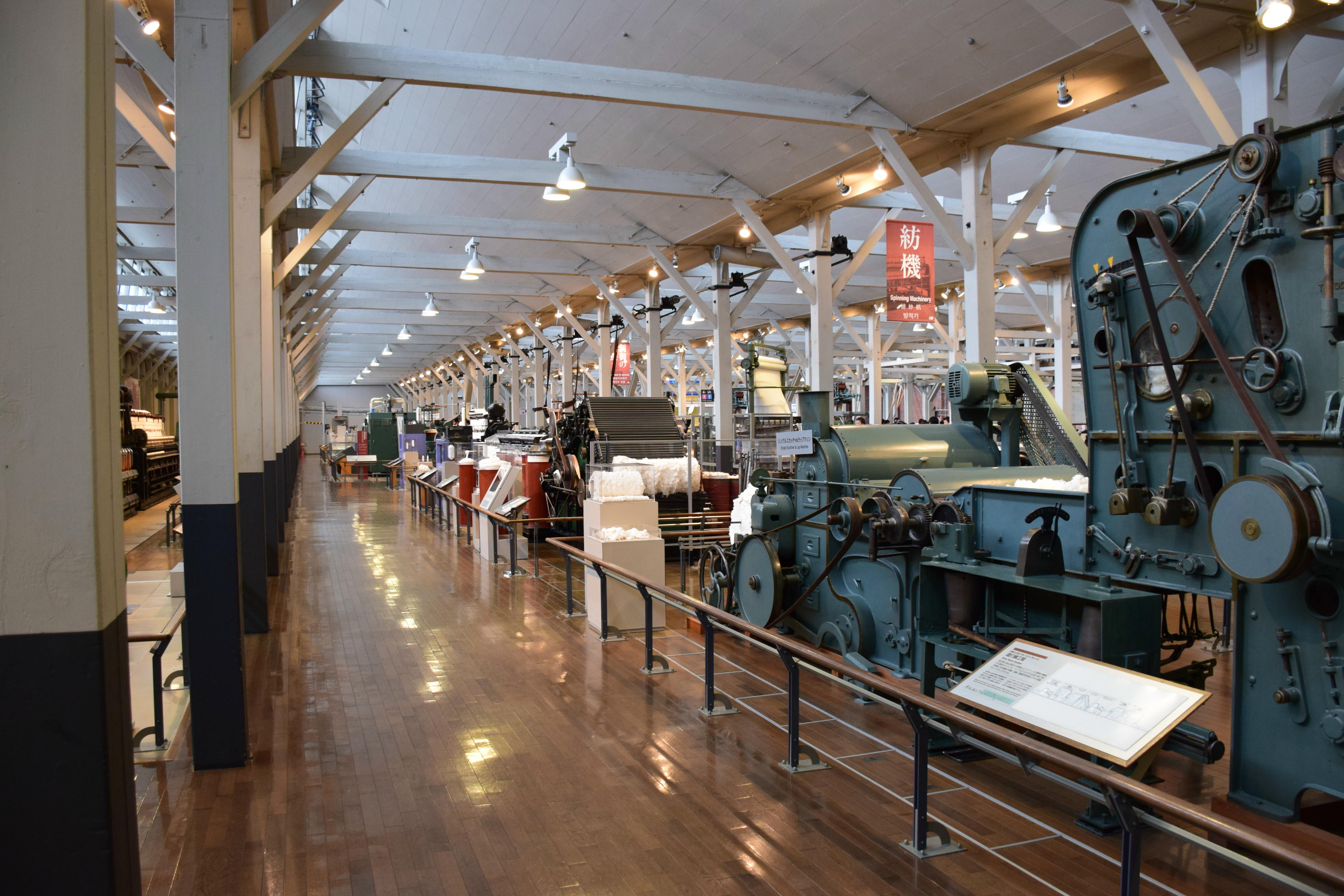
Textile Machinery Pavilion

The Toyota Commemorative Museum of Industry and Technology (産業技術記念館, Sangyo-Gijutsu Kinenkan), also known as Toyota Tecno Museum, is a technology museum located in Nishi-ku in the city of Nagoya, central Japan.

== History ==
Toyota started as a textile firm and evolved over decades into an international automobile producer. The museum was established in June 1994 (32 years ago) and is housed in an old red-brick textile factory. Its display starts with textile looms and then gradually goes over into the history of cars. Also featured are high-tech robots.

Access by public transport is Sako Station on the Meitetsu line or Kamejima Station by the Higashiyama Line.

== Images ==
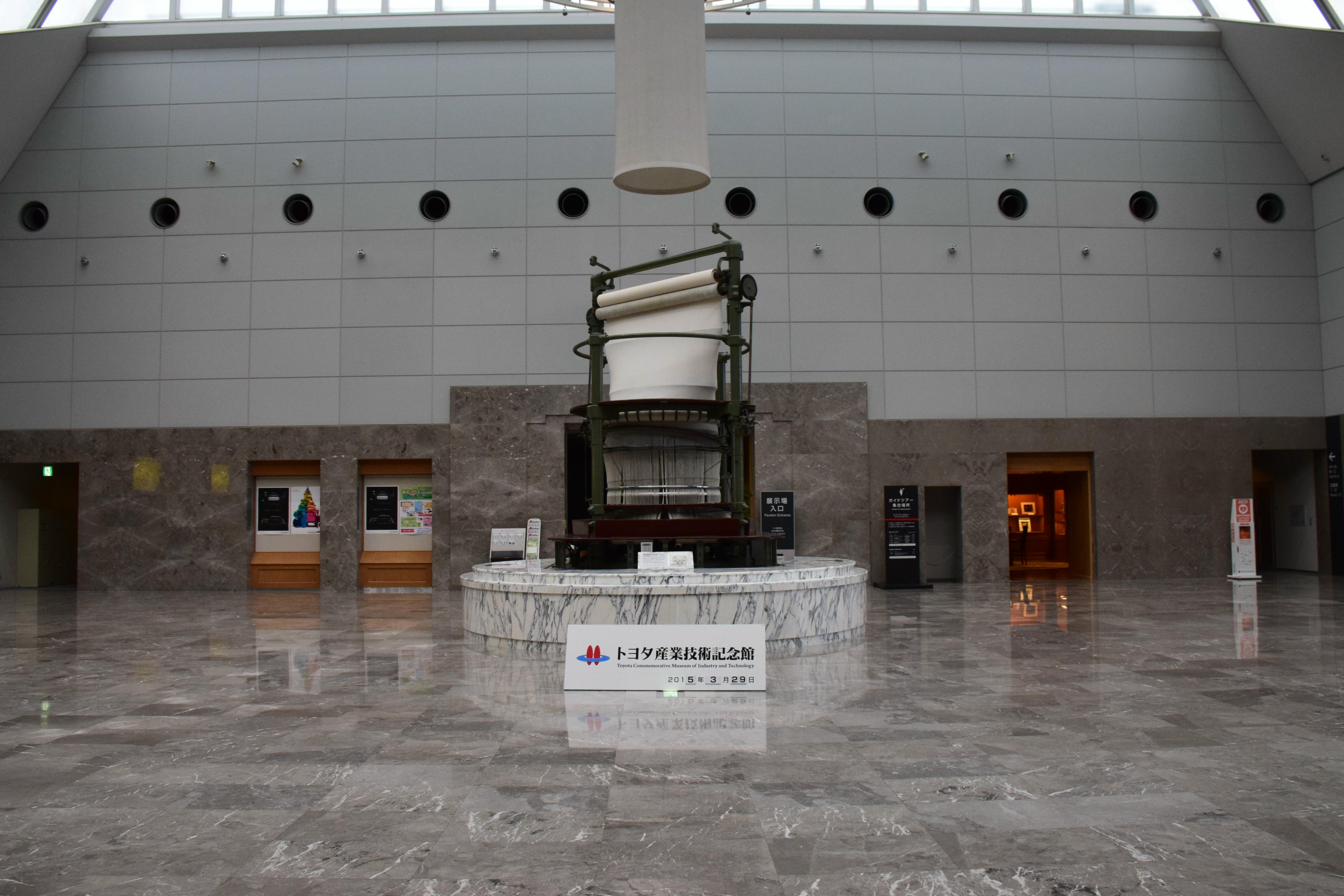

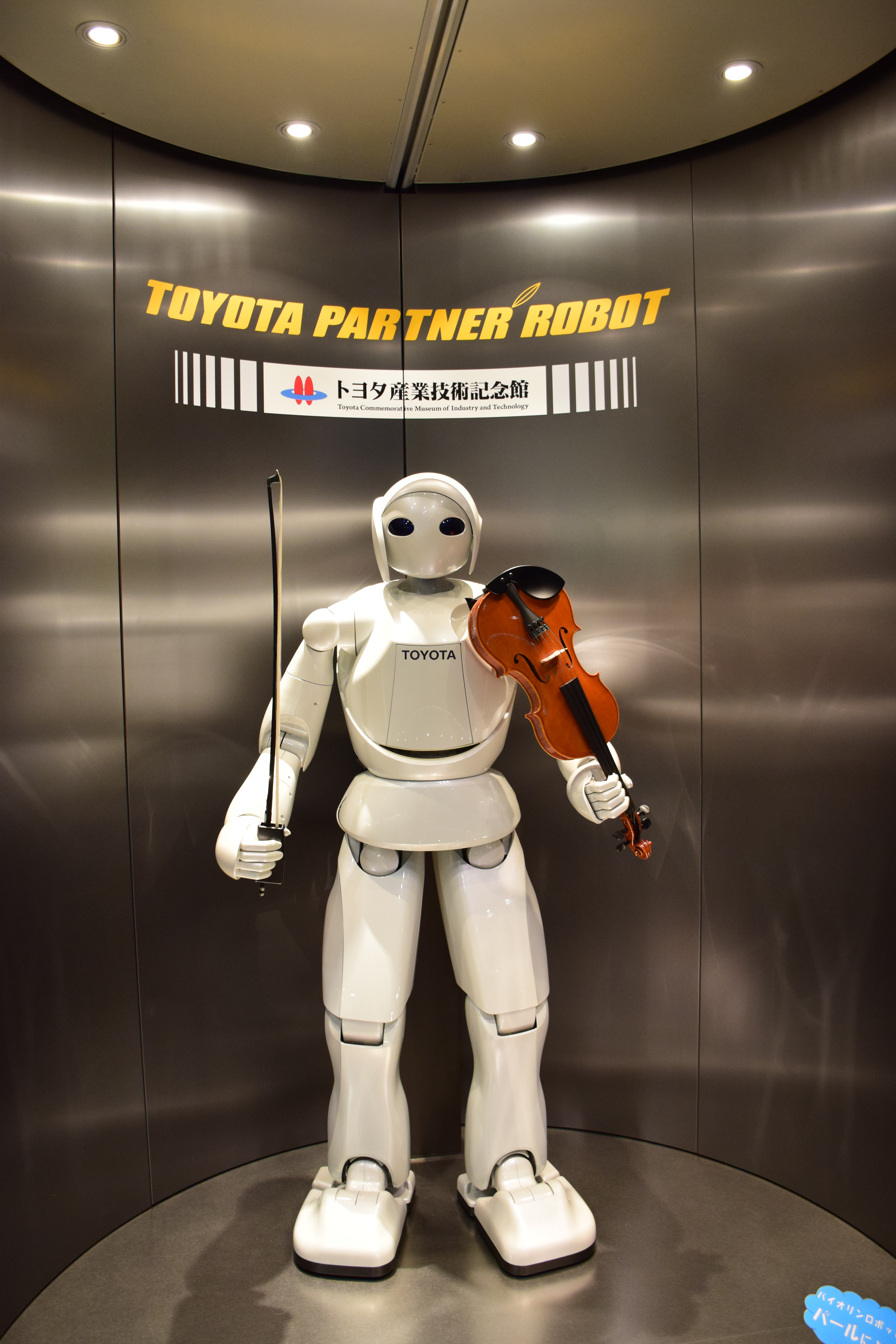

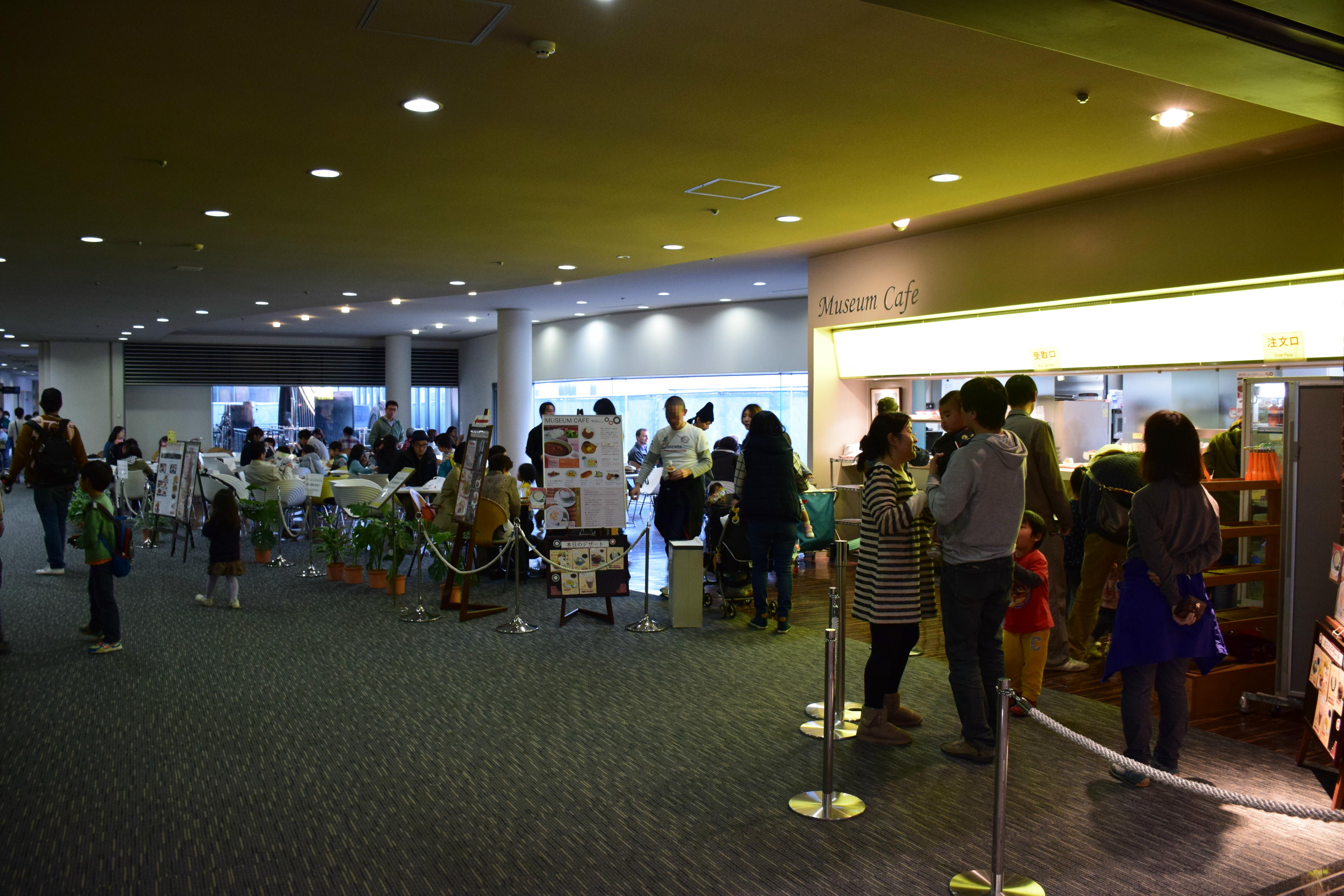

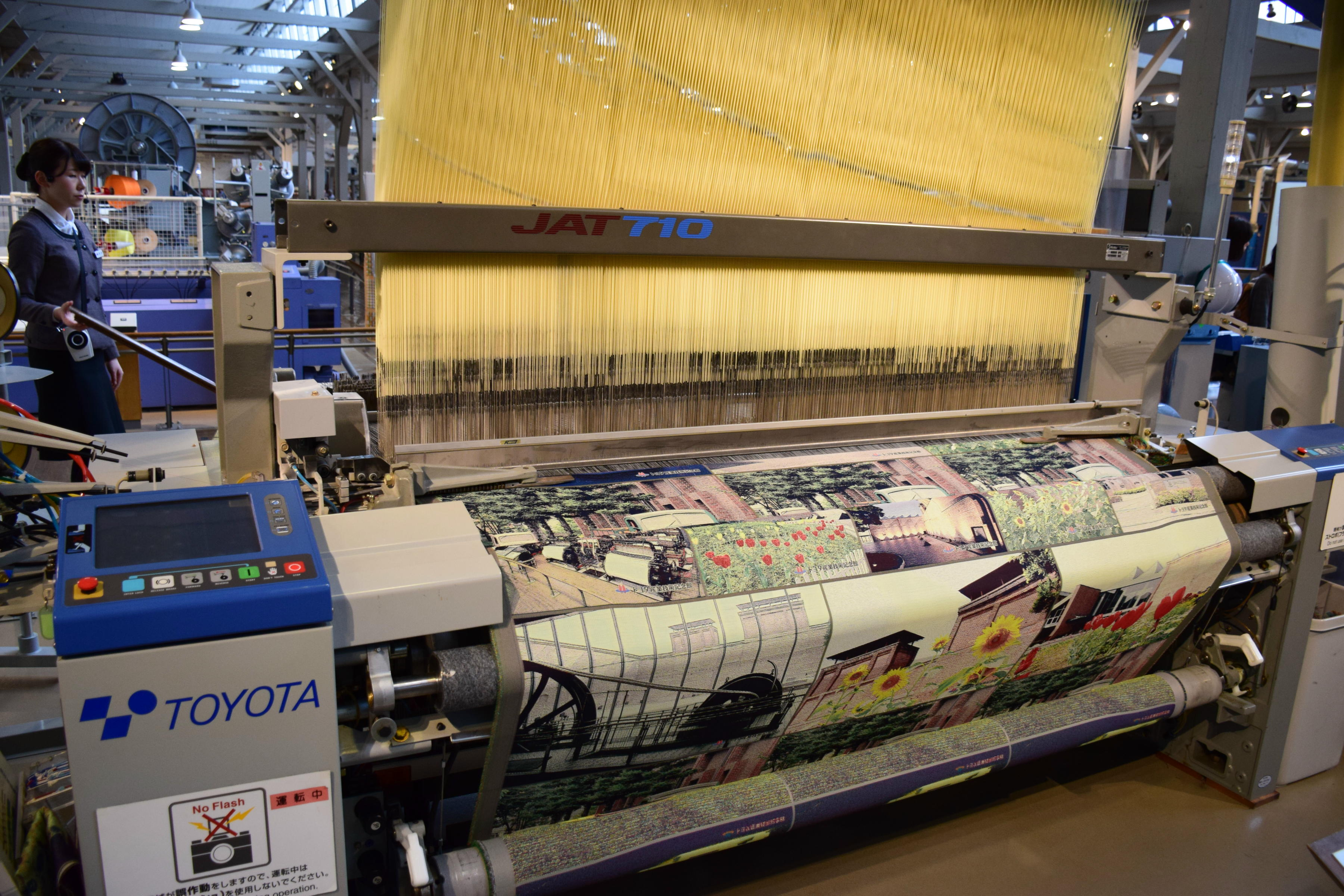

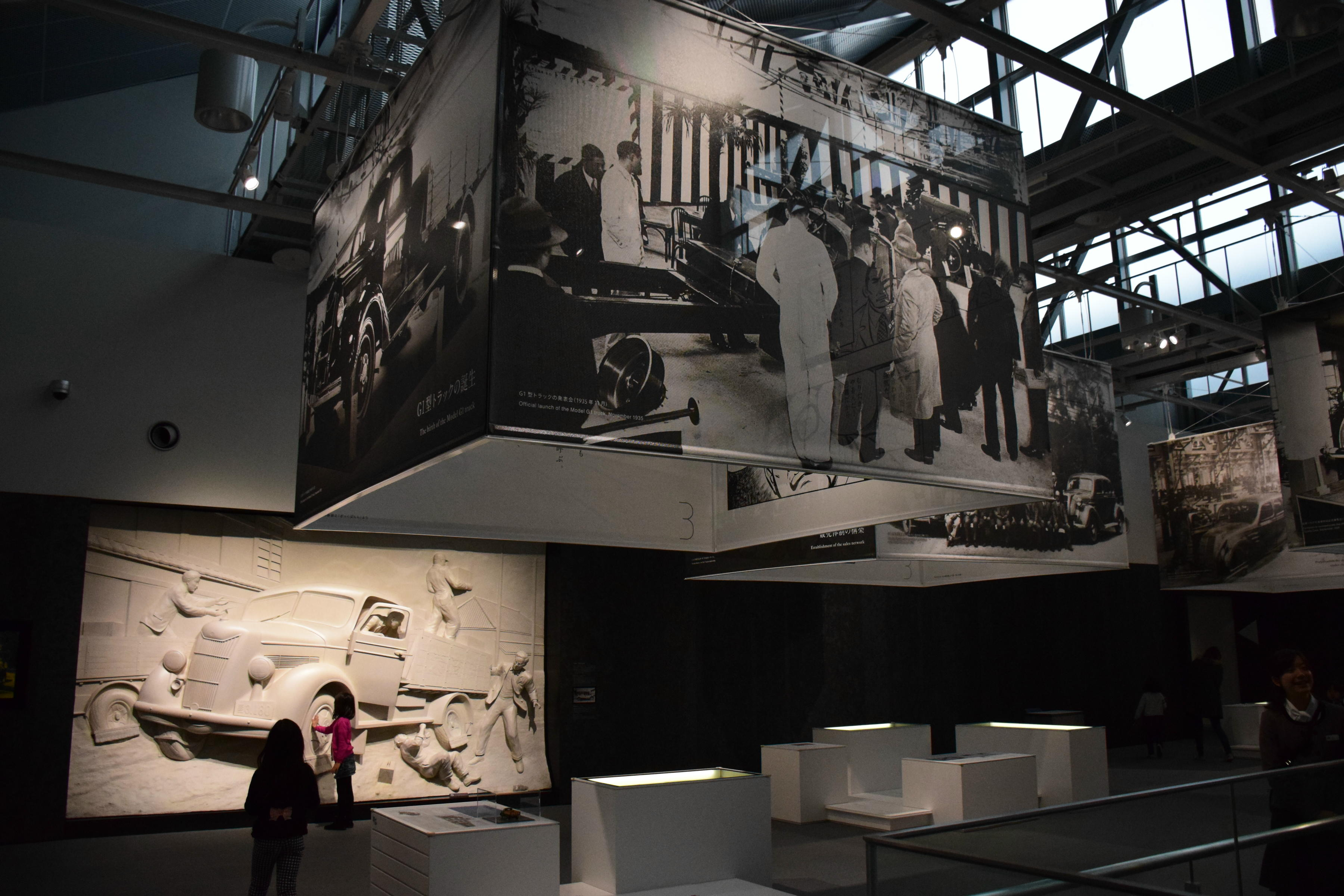

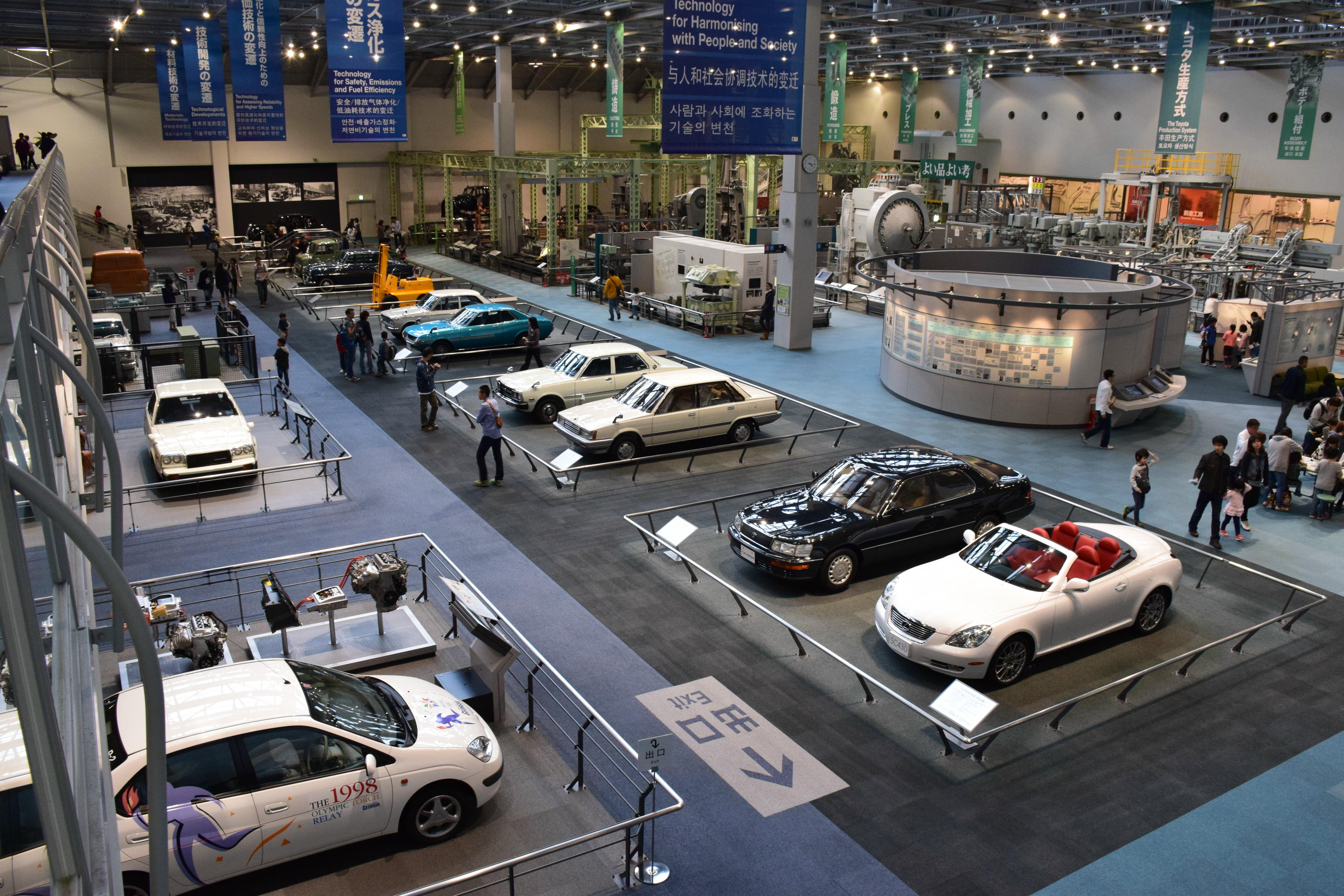

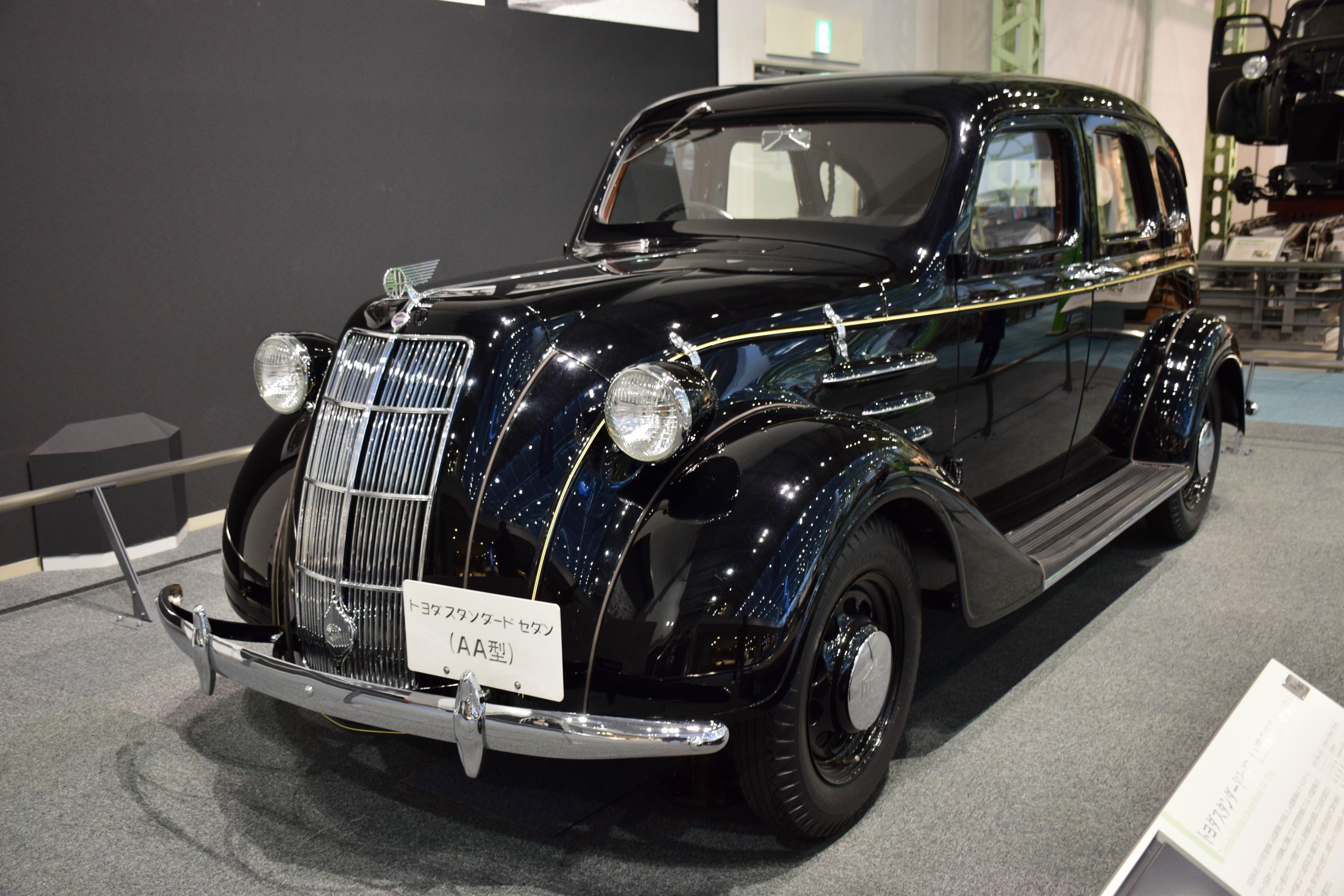

== See also ==
- Toyota Automobile Museum
