= David Caon =

Australian industrial designer

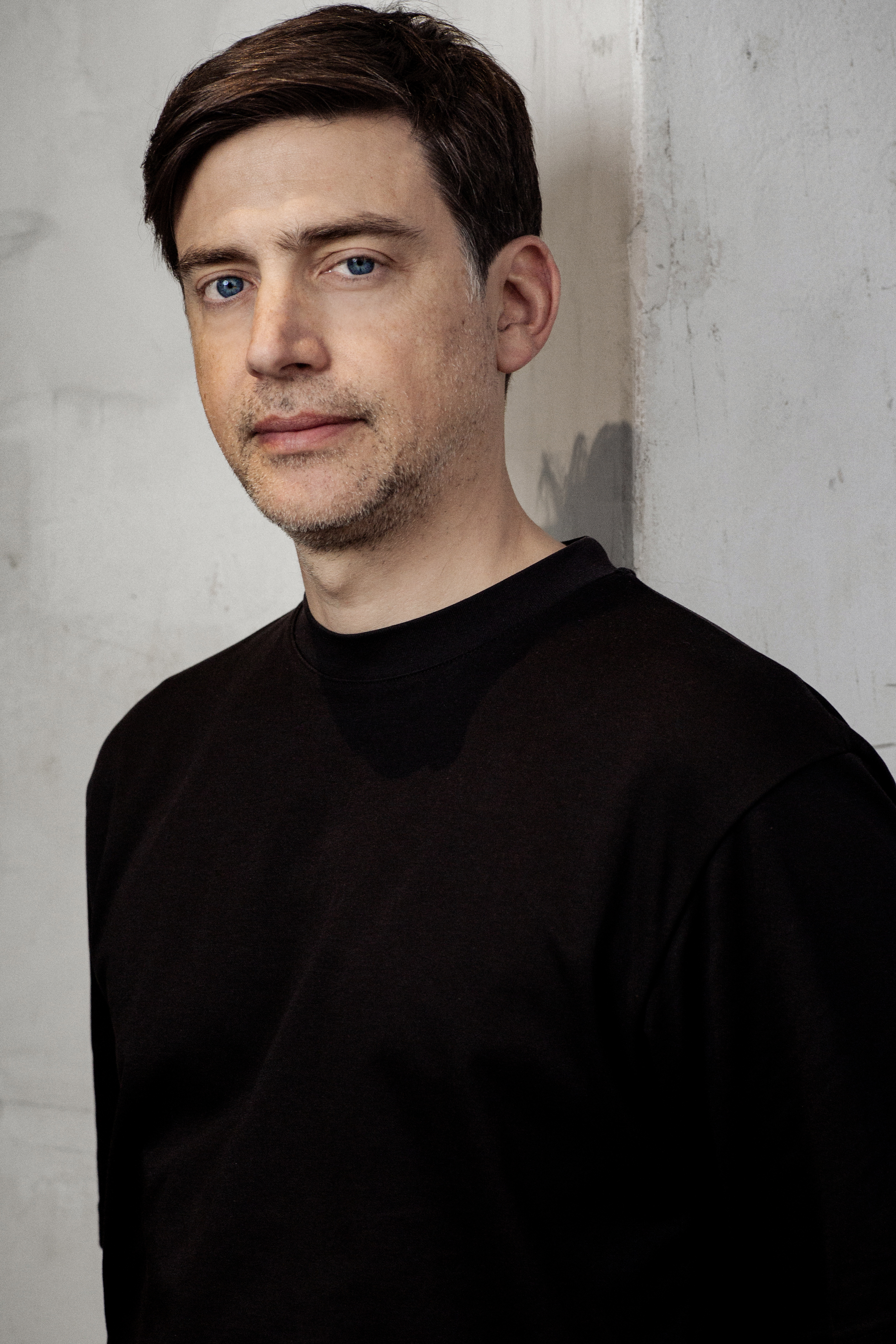
- Born: 1977 (age 48–49); Adelaide
- Education: University of South Australia, Coventry University
- Occupations: Designer, industrial designer, interior designer, creative director
- Spouse: Jeramie Hotz
- Website: caondesignoffice.com

David Caon (born 1977) is an Australian industrial designer and creative director. He is active in the fields of furniture, product, interior, and transportation design.

== Early life and education ==
David Caon was born in Adelaide, Australia to a family of Italian origin. He graduated from the University of South Australia with a Bachelor's degree in Industrial Design and subsequently travelled to Europe to further his studies. In 2000 he enrolled in the Automotive and Transport Design Master's programme at Coventry University, however, he quickly became disillusioned with the course and left after several weeks. He then moved to Milan to work as a graphic designer at Mondadori publishing group, after which he went to work for George Sowden, an English proponent of the Memphis movement. While in Milan, he also collaborated with Jerszy Seymour, a post-punk artist and designer.

== Work and career ==
Following his time in Italy, after a chance meeting with fellow Australian designer Marc Newson in 2003, Caon moved to France to join Newson's Paris studio. He worked on projects for clients such as LVMH, Nike, Samsonite, Magis, and Qantas. In a Sydney Morning Herald profile, Newson recalls that Caon, who was 26 when he joined the studio, was "bright eyed, ambitious, confident and full of energy". In the same article, Caon describes how he went "from working with Jerszy and that kind of blue-sky, idealistic, exhibition-style open thinking, without restrictions, to working on serious projects for serious clients. And Marc Newson has a dream stable." The collaboration lasted over 5 years, with Caon working his way up to become a senior designer and project manager for Newson.

Caon returned to Australia in 2009, and after briefly working with architects Woods Bagot, he established Caon Design Office, a Sydney based design practice. His first major client was Marc Newson Ltd. He has since worked for a wide range of clients across design disciplines including industrial design, product design, furniture design, transportation and aviation design, brand identity, graphic design, packaging, interior architecture and retail design. The studio has worked for companies such as Noritake, Recaro, Schneider Electric, Woolmark, and Qantas. The studio's range of commercial electrical sockets and switches designed for Schneider won an Australian Good Design Award in 2021.

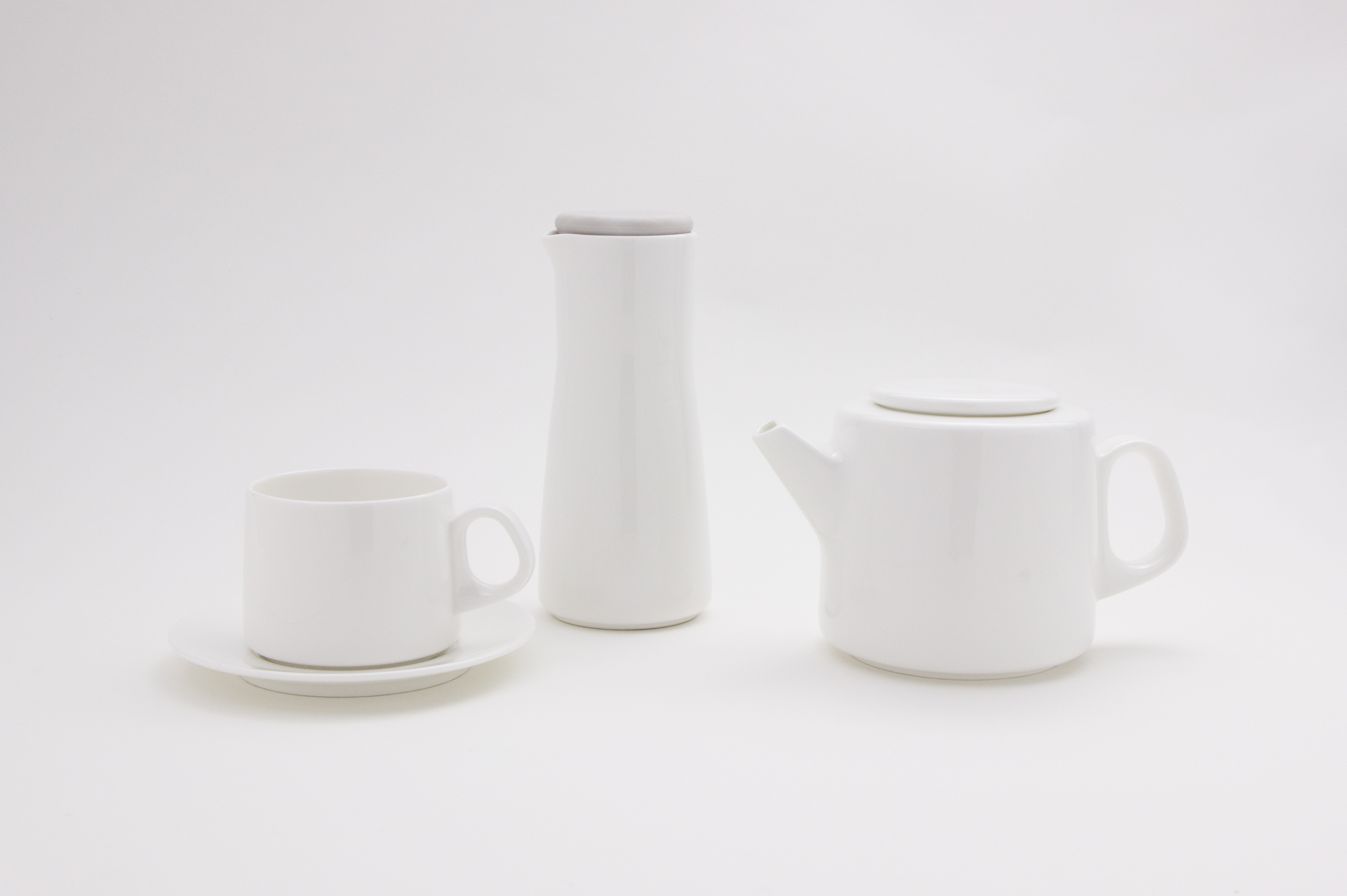
Qantas weight saving crockery manufactured by Noritake (Note: Qantas press release claims an annual fuel savings of over 535,000 kilogrammes.)

He has been a consultant responsible for the creative direction and design of the interiors of the Qantas fleet, including the refurbishment of its Marc Newson designed Airbus A380s, the design of new Boeing 787 Dreamliner aircraft, and Project Sunrise, a fleet of ultra long-range Airbus A350s for direct Australia to New York and London routes, as well as ground based interiors, bespoke furniture and fittings. The Wellbeing Zone from Caon's Project Sunrise design won the passenger comfort category of the 2024 Crystal Cabin Awards. Caon's weight reducing designs for Qantas's in-flight crockery and cutlery resulted in an annual savings of over 500,000 kilograms of fuel.

In collaboration with architects Acme and Akin Atelier, Caon has designed retail and hospitality interiors including restaurants for Australian celebrity chef Neil Perry such as "Margaret" and "Next Door" in Sydney; Qantas's first class, business class, and transit lounges in Australia and abroad; as well as residential interiors for private clients.

In 2020 Caon and business partner Henry Wilson founded Laker, an Australian manufacturer of design editions, furniture, home accessories, and architectural fittings.

Caon and creative director Paulina Paige Ortega founded a graphic design practice called Actuel Studio in 2024.

In 2025 he was invited to Japan to take part in the Tokai Project, the second edition of the Craft x Tech initiative. The programme is an exploration of how traditional "aesthetic sensibilities embedded in Japanese craft can be reimagined through a thoughtful and skillful creative process" reinterpreted through the lens of contemporary design, cultural preservation, and technology. The programme is part of a movement that "explores how inherited knowledge can evolve without losing its soul" and has been described as "one of the most interesting conversations happening today." Caon's contribution was a pair of pieces titled Fushi made with Mino Yaki ceramics, which were unveiled in Tokyo at Kudan House in the summer of 2026, and subsequently exhibited in the Victoria and Albert Museum during the London Design Festival. Other Craft x Tech participants have included artists and designers such as Ini Archibong, Eugene Kangawa, Francesca Lanzavecchia (Lanzavecchia + Wai), Philippe Malouin, Sabine Marcelis, Yoichi Ochiai, Studio SWINE, Atang Tshikare, Bethan Laura Wood, and Hideki Yoshimoto.

In 2026 Caon was commissioned by the Powerhouse Museum to design a 100 year time capsule to be buried at the museum's new Parramatta site. His addition to the tradition will be the third capsule compiled by the museum–the first was buried in 1879 at Garden Palace, and the second at Ultimo in 1981.

Caon was named Vogue Living Creative of the Year for 2026.

== Personal life ==
Caon lives and works in Sydney, Australia. He is married to Jeramie Hotz, an Australian jeweller and entrepreneur. They have two children.

== Publications ==
- Philpott, Alex; Pardo, Benjamin; Didero, Maria Cristina (2026). Philpott, Alex; Pearce, Oscar; Page, Kester; Slatter, Joe (eds.). The Product Design 100. London: Design Burger. pp. 116–117. ISBN 978-1-0369-5572-4.
