= Noritake Garden =

Garden in Nagoya, Japan

Coordinates: 35.179868°N 136.881586°E

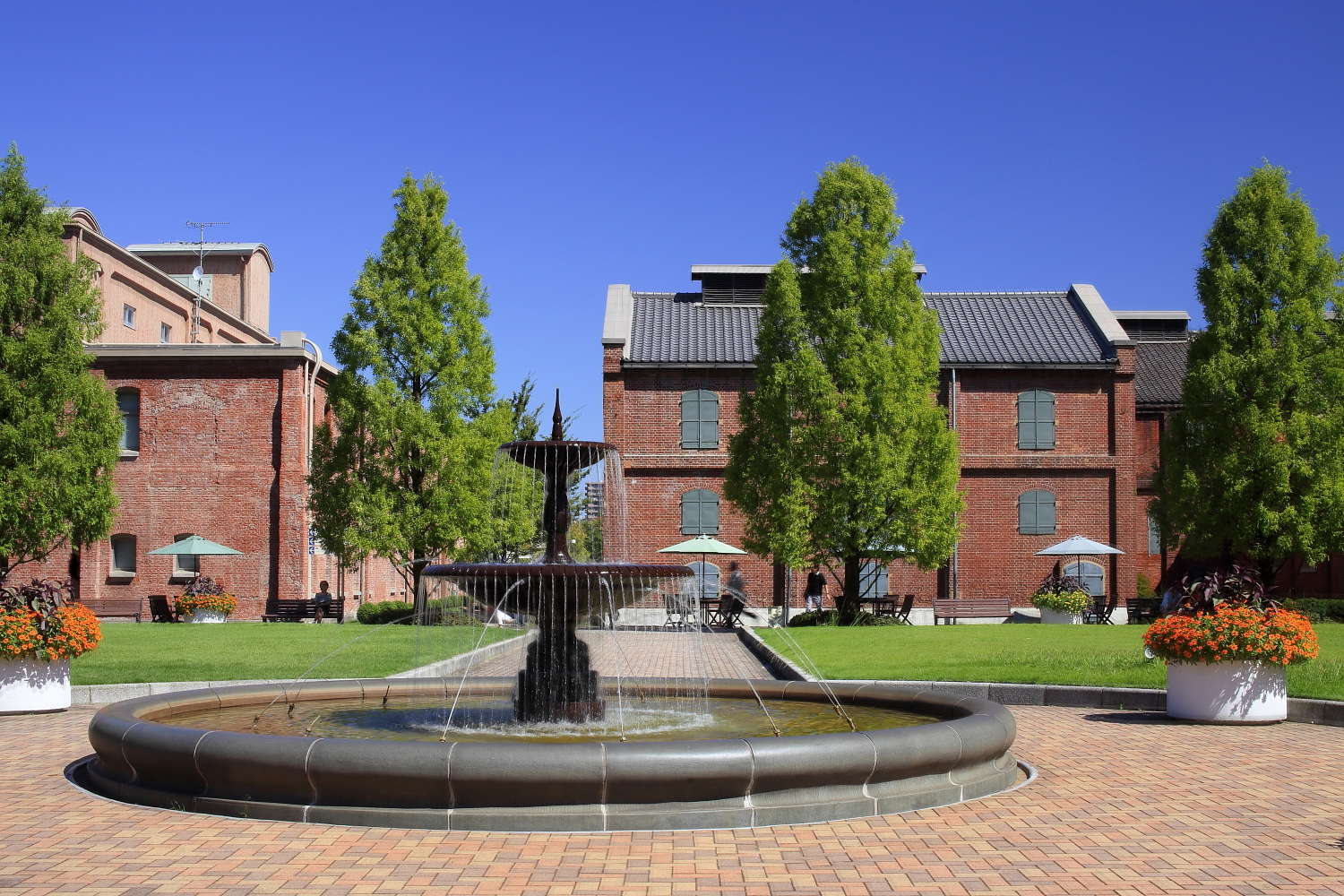
Noritake Garden with its old factory

The Noritake Garden (ノリタケの森) is located in the city of Nagoya in central Japan, founded in 2001.

== History ==
The garden was constructed on the former Noritake factory grounds and exhibits the company, its history and products. In the various showrooms visitors can observe the creation process of porcelain or participate in workshops. The museum exhibits old Noritake pieces, such as vases, jars and dishes from the early 1900s. Also current products are shown. The garden also has several stores and a few restaurants for the visitors.

Access by public transport is a 15-minute walk from Nagoya Station.
