= Naka-ku, Nagoya =

Ward of Nagoya in Chūbu, Japan

Naka 中区
- Ward
- Naka Ward
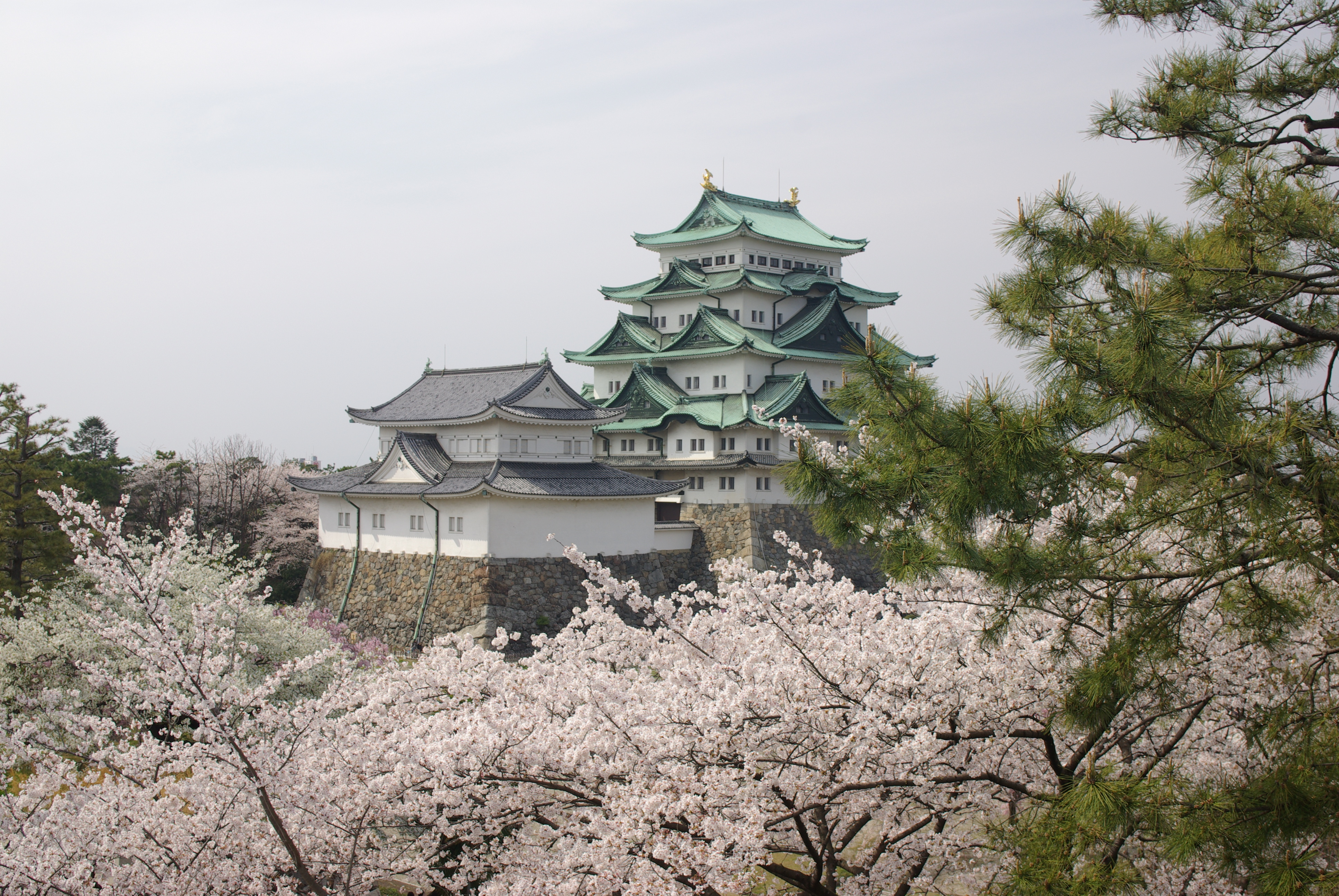
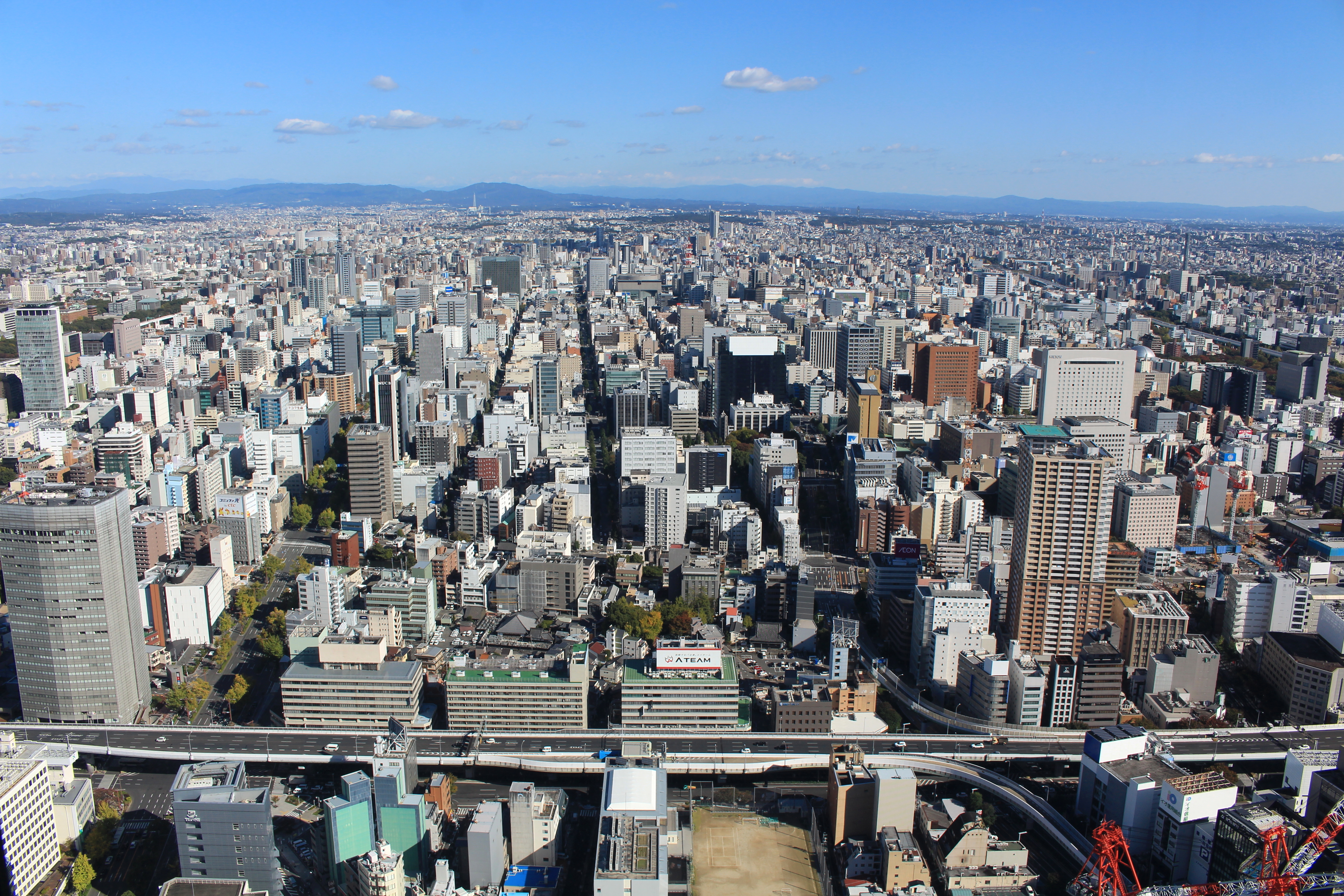
- Nagoya Castle; Sakae area from Midland Square

- Flag Emblem（November 1987- ）

- Location of Naka-ku in Nagoya

- Location within Japan
- Coordinates: 35°10′7″N 136°54′37″E
- Country: Japan
- Region: Tōkai region Chūbu region
- Prefecture: Aichi
- Established: April 1, 1908

Area
  - Total: 9.38 km^{2} (3.62 sq mi)

Population (October 1, 2019)
  - Total: 90,918
  - Density: 9,690/km^{2} (25,100/sq mi)
- Time zone: UTC+9 (Japan Standard Time)
- Tree: Ginkgo biloba
- Flower: Pansy
- Phone number: 052-241-3601
- Address: Sakae 4-chome, Naka-ku, Nagoya-shi, Aichi-ken 464-8644
- Website: www.city.nagoya.jp/naka/ (in Japanese)

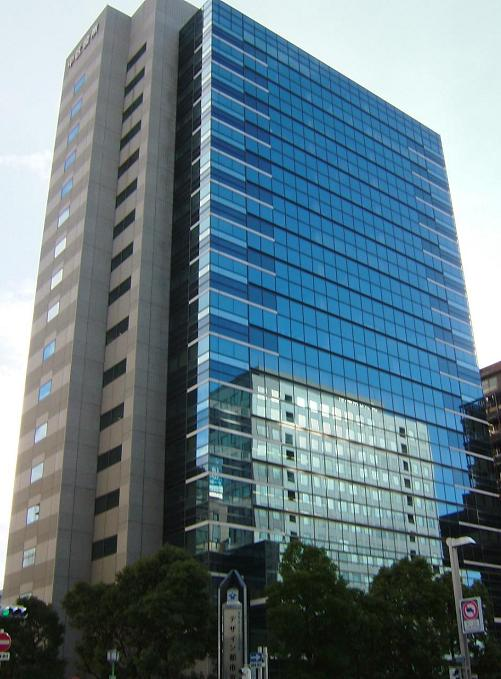
Naka Ward Office

Naka Ward (中区, Naka-ku; "Middle Ward") is one of the 16 wards of the city of Nagoya in Aichi Prefecture, Japan. As of 1 October 2019, the ward has an estimated population of 90,918 and a population density of 9,693 persons per km^{2}. The total area is 9.38 km^{2}.

== Geography ==
Naka Ward is located in the center of Nagoya city. Largely hemmed in by Sakura-dōri (桜通り), Ōtsu-dōri (大津通り), Fushimi-dōri (伏見通り) and Tsurumai-dōri (鶴舞通り), it contains the main shopping area of Sakae which includes a massive air-conditioned 5 square-kilometer underground mall and the 'after-five' semi-red light districts of Nishiki and Shin-sakae.

=== Surrounding municipalities ===
- Chikusa Ward
- Kita Ward
- Higashi Ward
- Nishi Ward
- Nakamura Ward
- Shōwa Ward
- Atsuta Ward
- Nakagawa Ward

== History ==
Naka Ward was one of the original four wards of the city of Nagoya, established on April 1, 1908. On February 1, 1944, a portion of Naka Ward was divided out to become Sakae Ward (栄区, Sakae-ku), but was merged back into Naka Ward on November 3, 1945. Most of the area was completely destroyed during the bombing of Nagoya in World War II. After the war, the layout of the streets was changed to a grid pattern, with wide streets serving as firebreaks. The city is especially proud of Sakae's 100-meter road (100メートル道路) so named because of its width. There are small parks and areas for public performances in the area between two four-lane roads that service the city centre. The road is about 100 m (328 ft) in width, and 1 km (0.6 mi) in length.

Until the 1980s, town-planners were not allowed to build structures more than six stories in height outside of the business districts.

== Economy ==
In addition the Sakae shopping area, there is also Ōsu, a sprawling old-style small-trader shopping area spreading out from the large Ōsu Kannon (大須観音), a Buddhist temple that holds flea markets. The covered streets housing numerous restaurants and stores selling fashion garments, electronics and alternative medicine give a small taste of what Japan might have been like before modernization. Between Ōsu and Sakae in Shirakawa Park are the city's Science and Modern Art museums. South of Ōsu is Kanayama Station (straddling the border with Atsuta-ku and Nakagawa-ku), Nagoya's second-most important rail transportation hub after Nagoya Station and a major access point for the Central Japan International Airport. Many izakayas and pachinko parlors can be found in its vicinity.

Naka-ku is also home to the city's Opera House and the main government offices, including the Nagoya City Hall and the Aichi Prefectural Government Office.

When Matsuzakaya was an independent company, its headquarters were in Naka-ku.

Fushimi is the traditional commercial area.

== Education ==
- Ohkagakuen University
- Tokyo University of Social Welfare

== Transportation ==
=== Railroads ===
- JR Central – Chūō Main Line
  - Kanayama – Tsurumai
- Meitetsu – Seto Line
  - Higashiōte
- Nagoya Municipal Subway – Higashiyama Line
  - Fushimi – Sakae
- Nagoya Municipal Subway – Meijō Line
  - Kanayama – Higashi Betsuin – Kamimaezu – Yabachō – Sakae – Hisaya-ōdōri – Nagoyajo
- Nagoya Municipal Subway – Tsurumai Line
  - Marunouchi – Fushimi – Ōsu Kannon – Kamimaezu – Tsurumai
- Nagoya Municipal Subway – Sakura-dōri Line
  - Marunouchi – Hisaya-ōdōri

=== Highways ===
- Ring Route (Nagoya Expressway)
- Route 2 (Nagoya Expressway)
- Japan National Route 19
- Japan National Route 22
- Japan National Route 41
- Japan National Route 153

== Notable attractions ==
- Nagoya Castle
- Nagoya TV Tower
- Ōsu Kannon
- Banshō-ji
- Shōman-ji, Nagoya
- Nagoya City Science Museum
- Nagoya City Art Museum
- Electricity Museum, Nagoya
- Nagoya/Boston Museum of Fine Arts
- Hisaya Ōdori Park
- Misono-za
- Ran no Yakata
- SKE48
- Kawabun
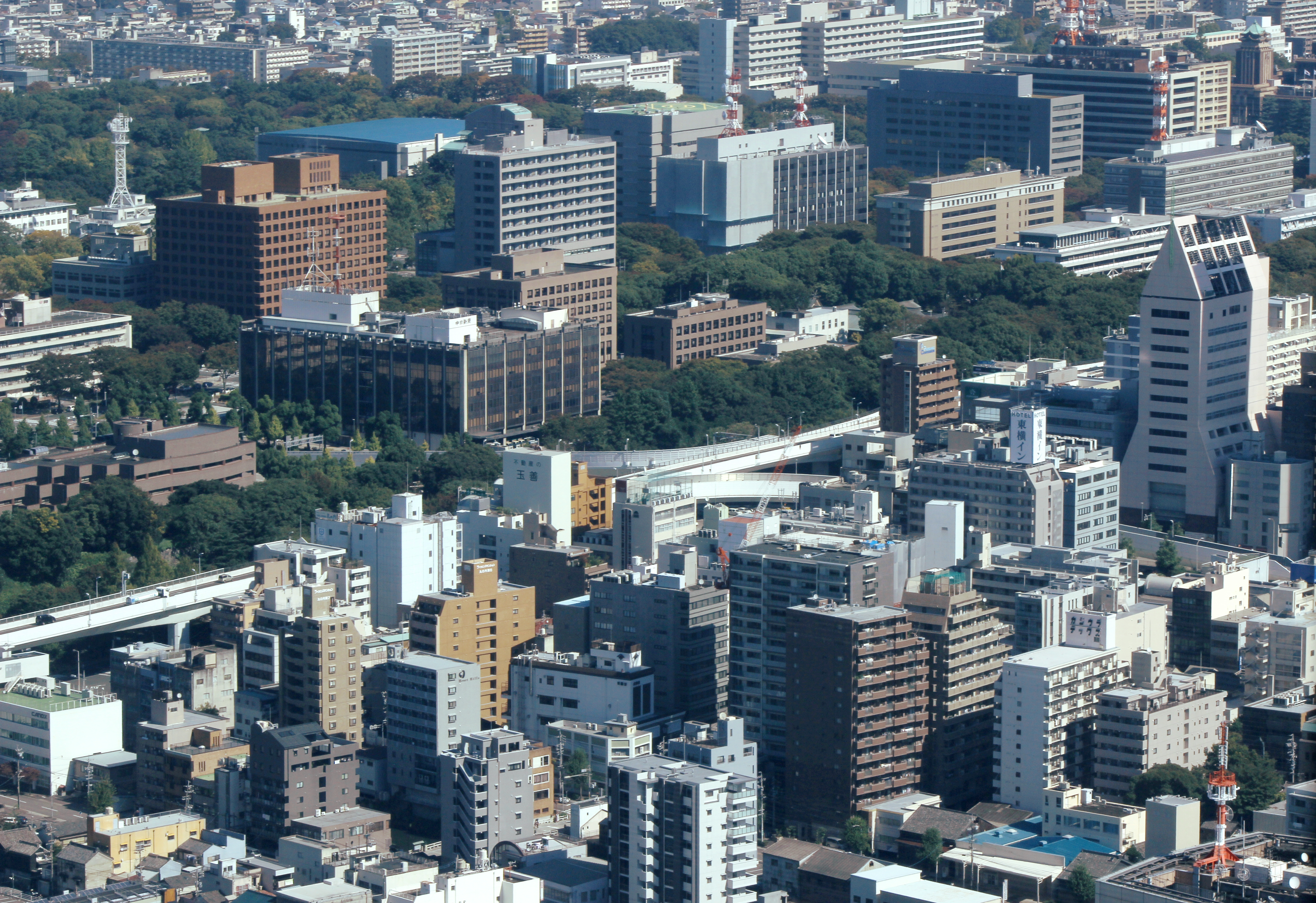
Marunouchi and Sannomaru

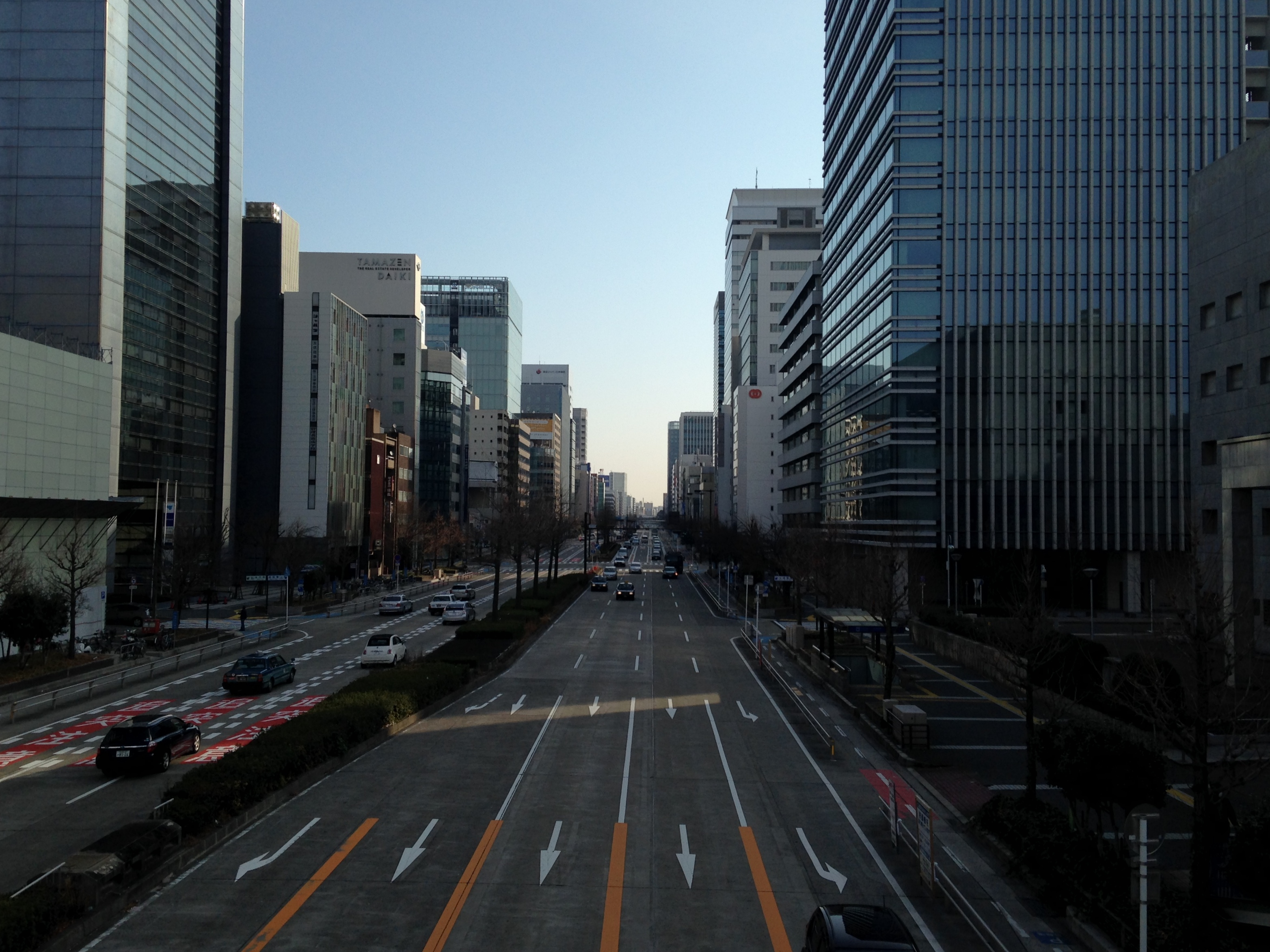
Marunouchi (Business District)

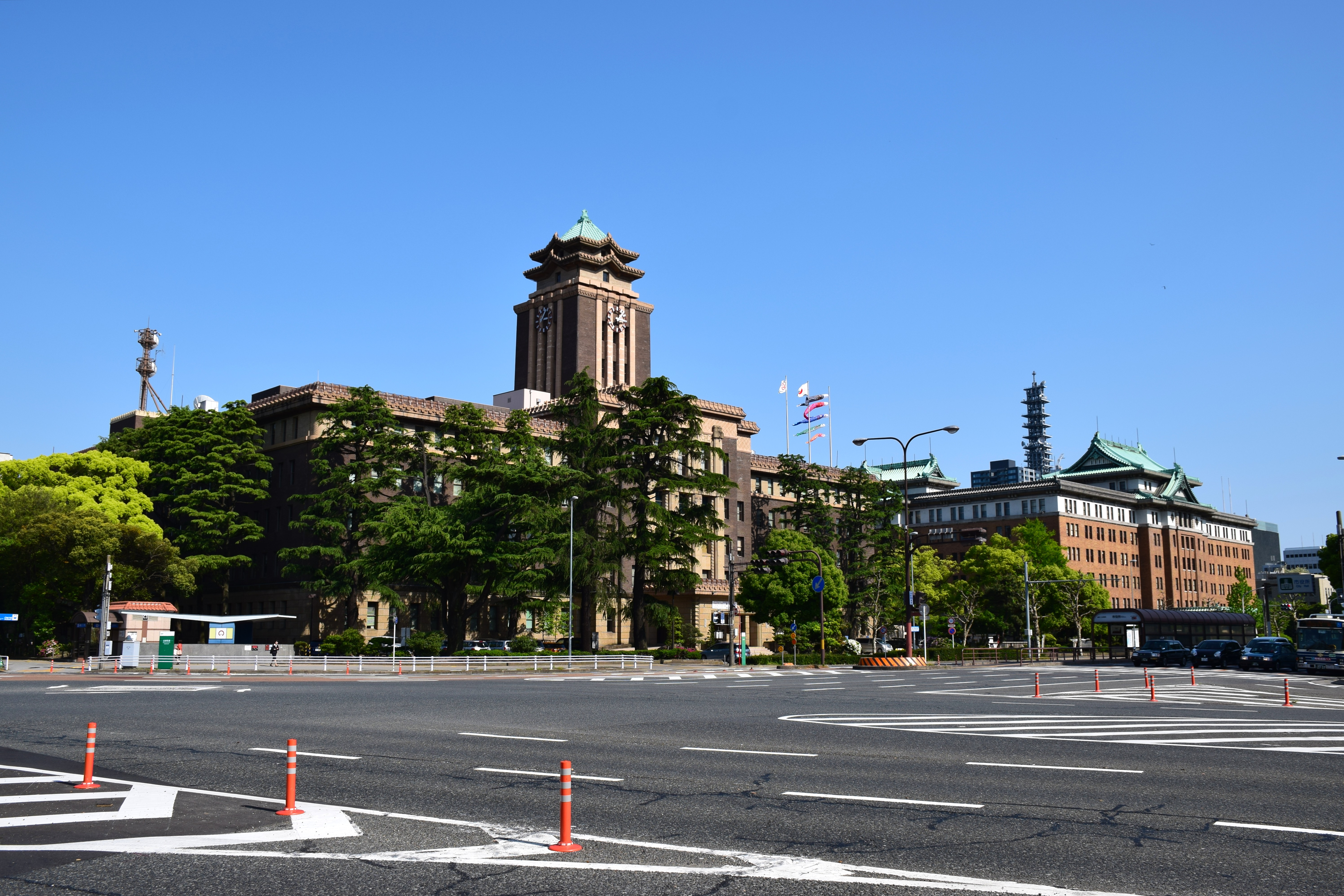
Sannomaru (Government Town)

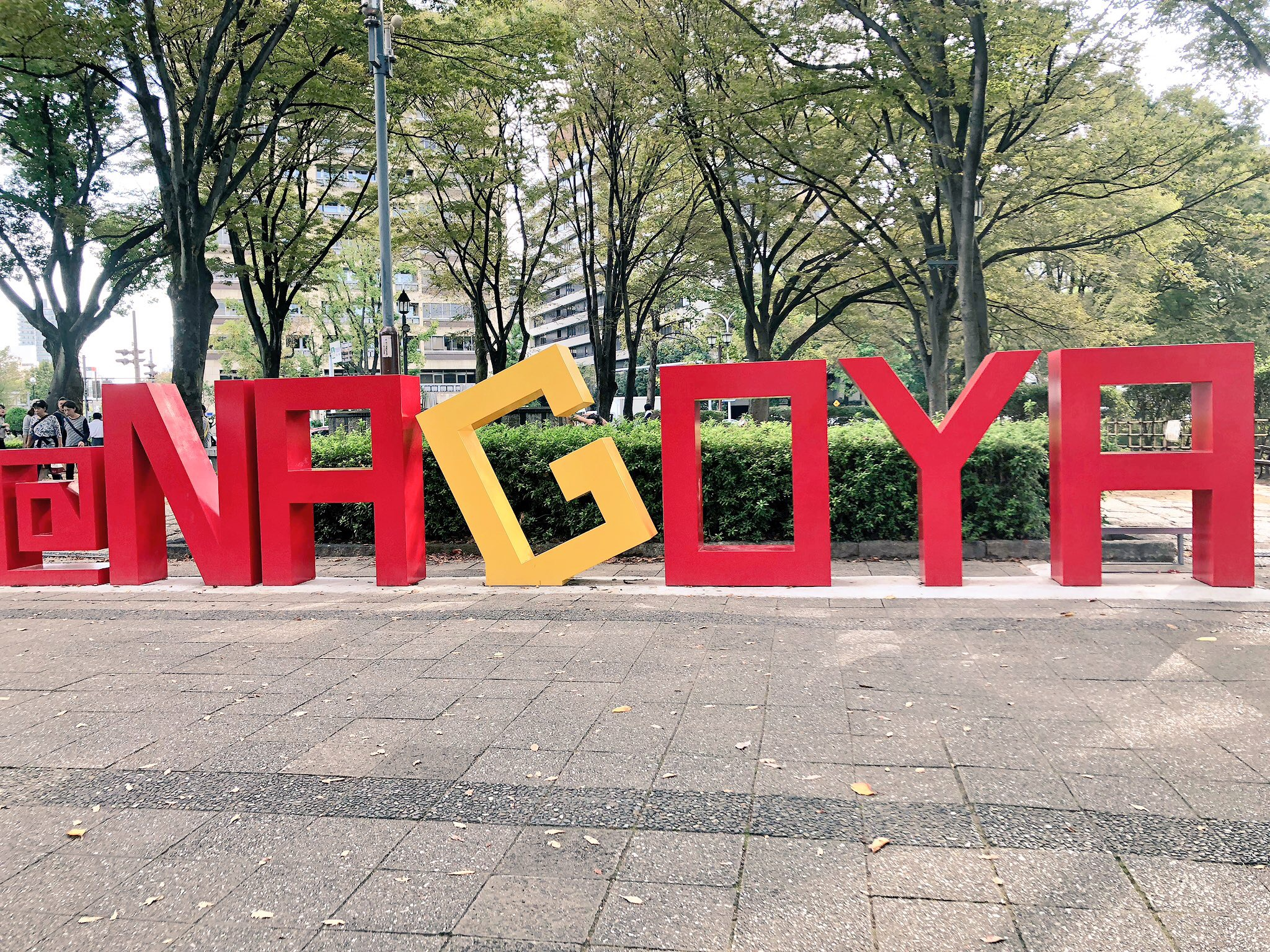
@NAGOYA

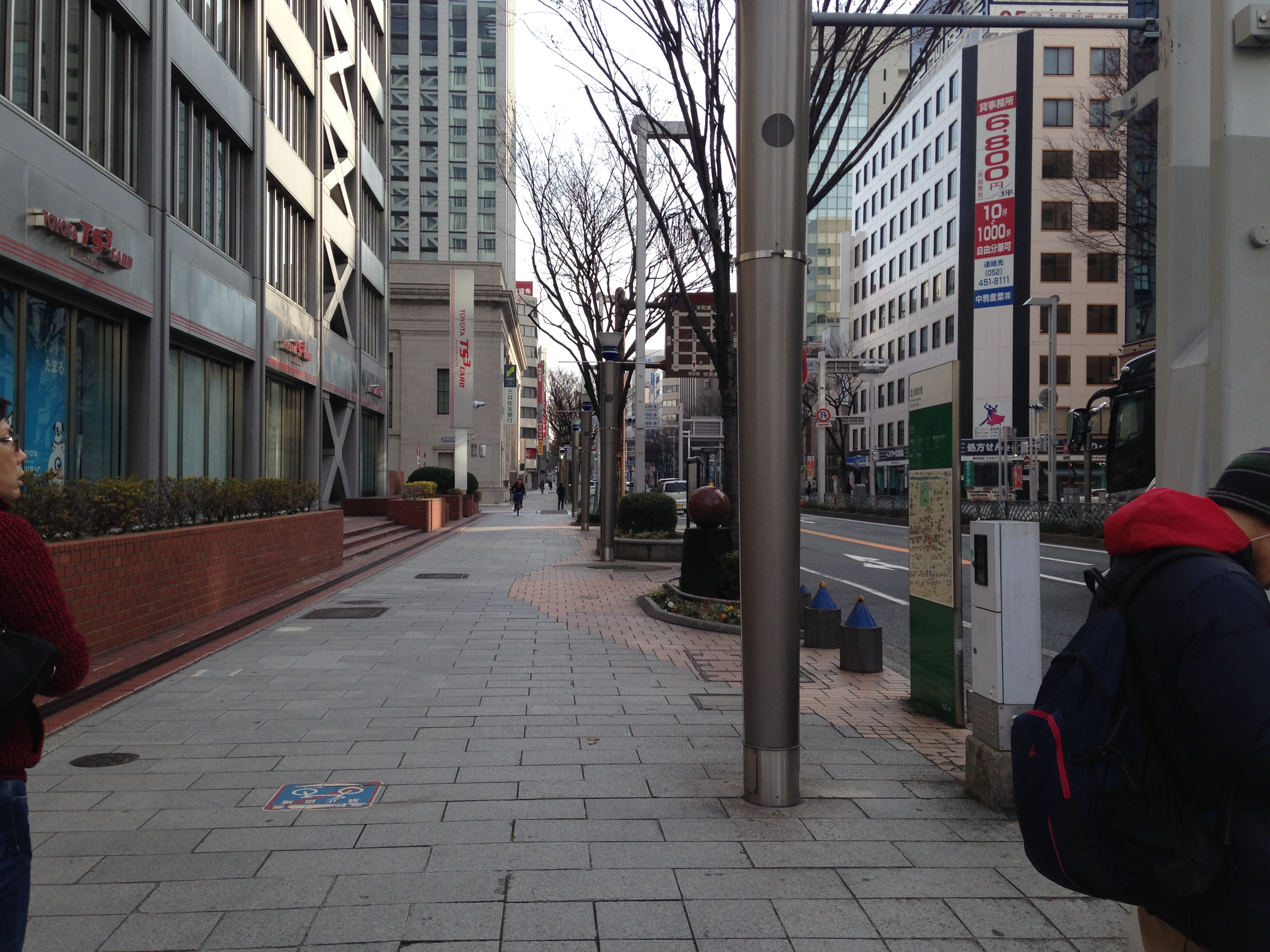
Fushimi (Financial District)

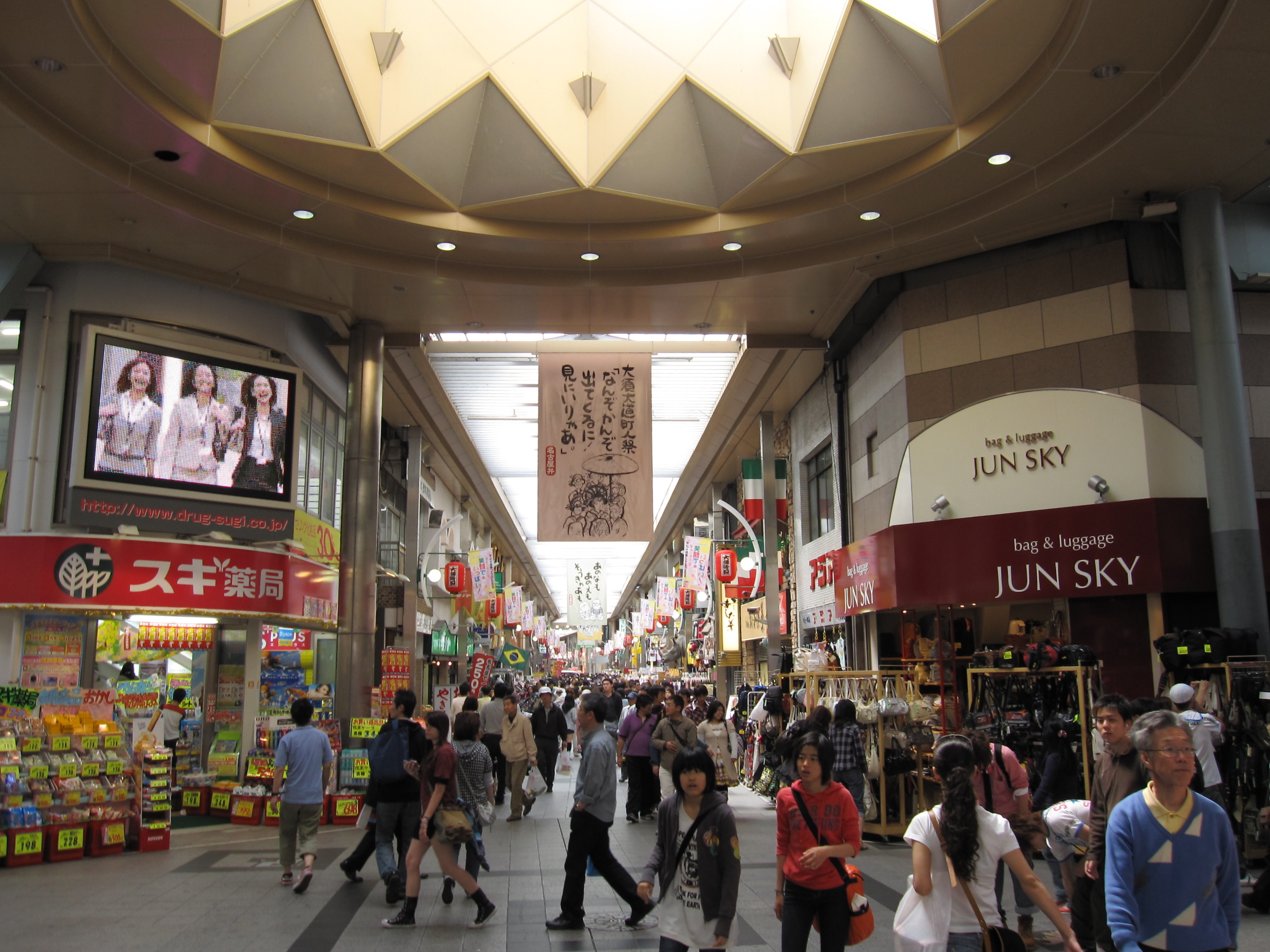
Ōsu (Electric Town)

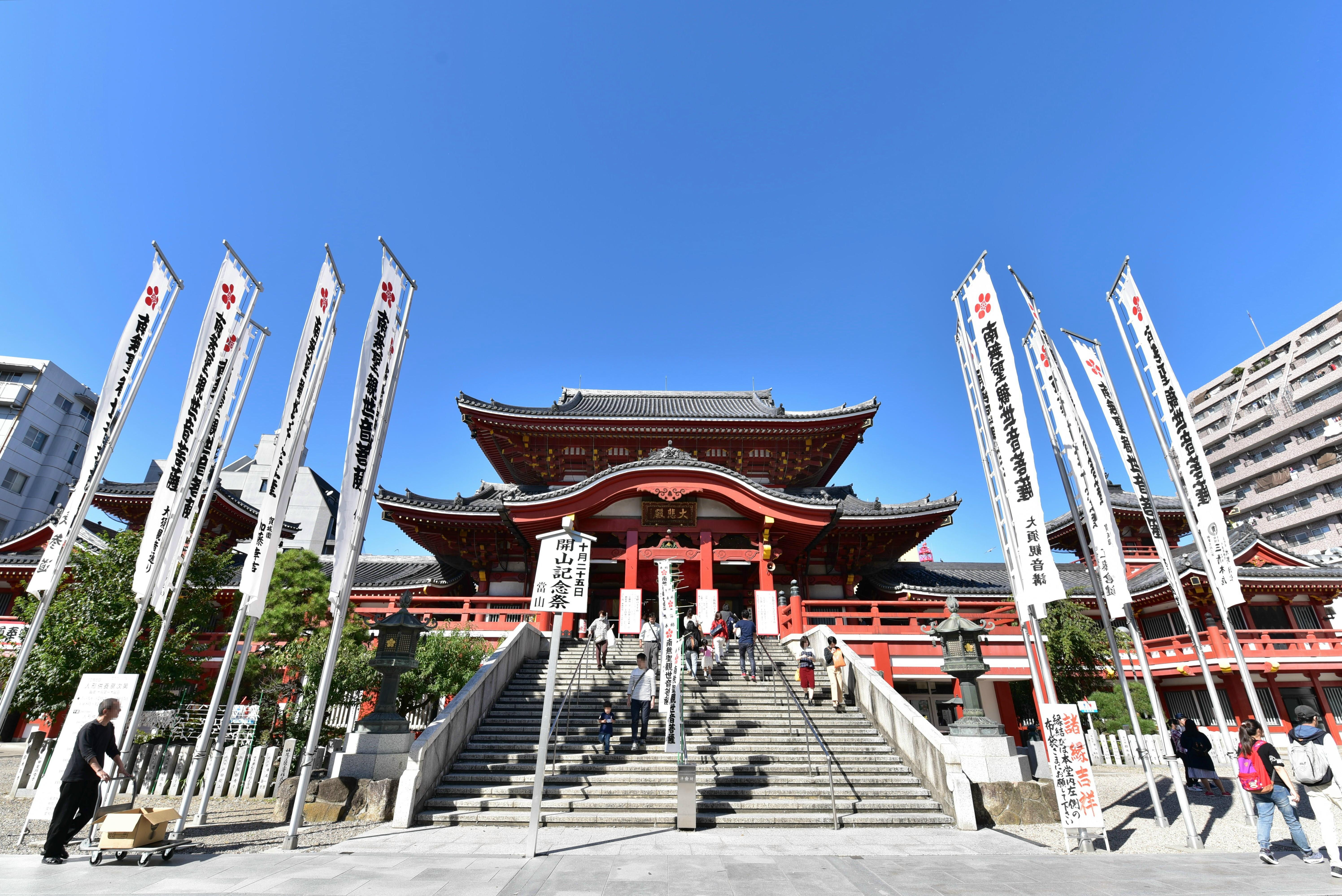
Ōsu Kannon

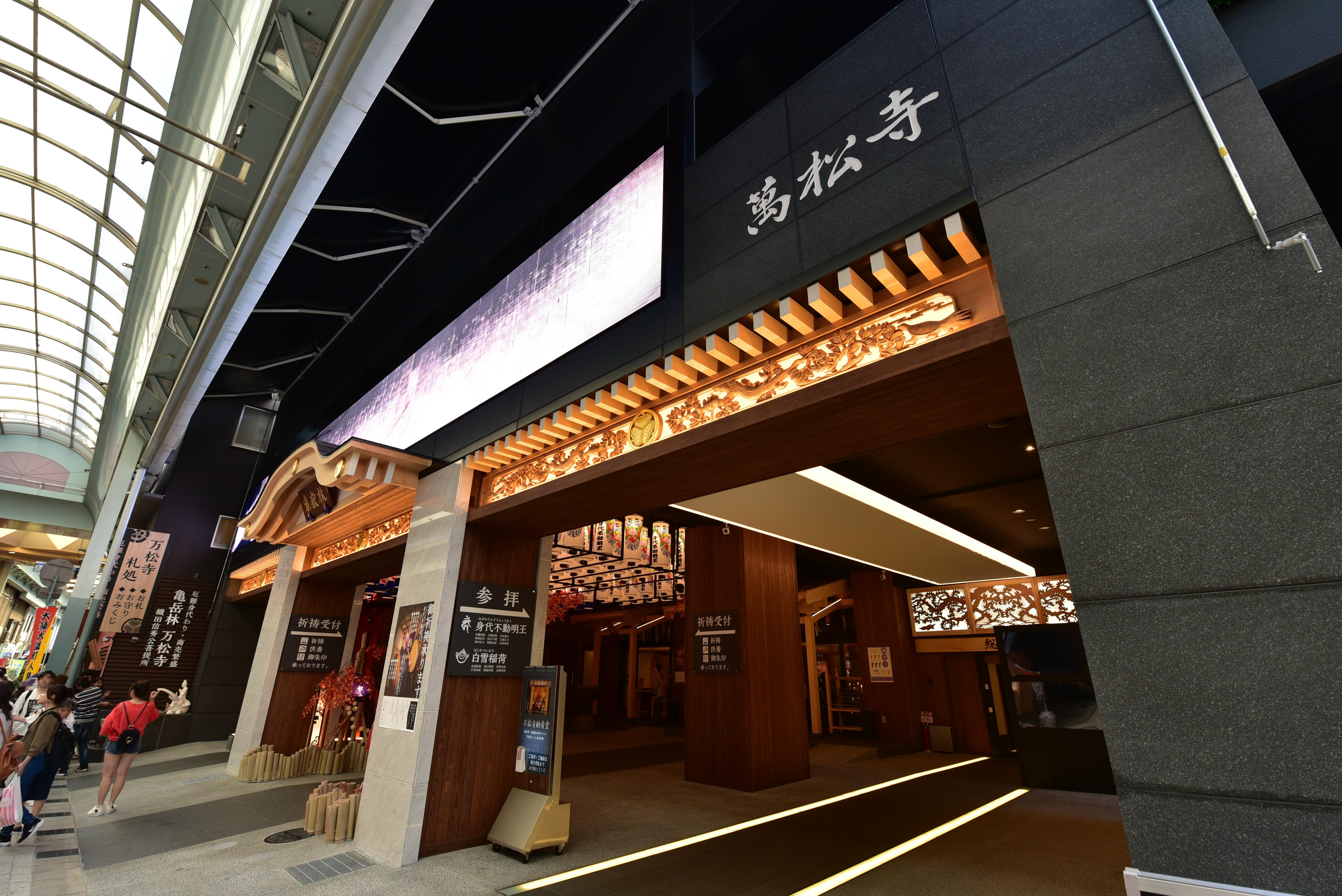
Banshō-ji

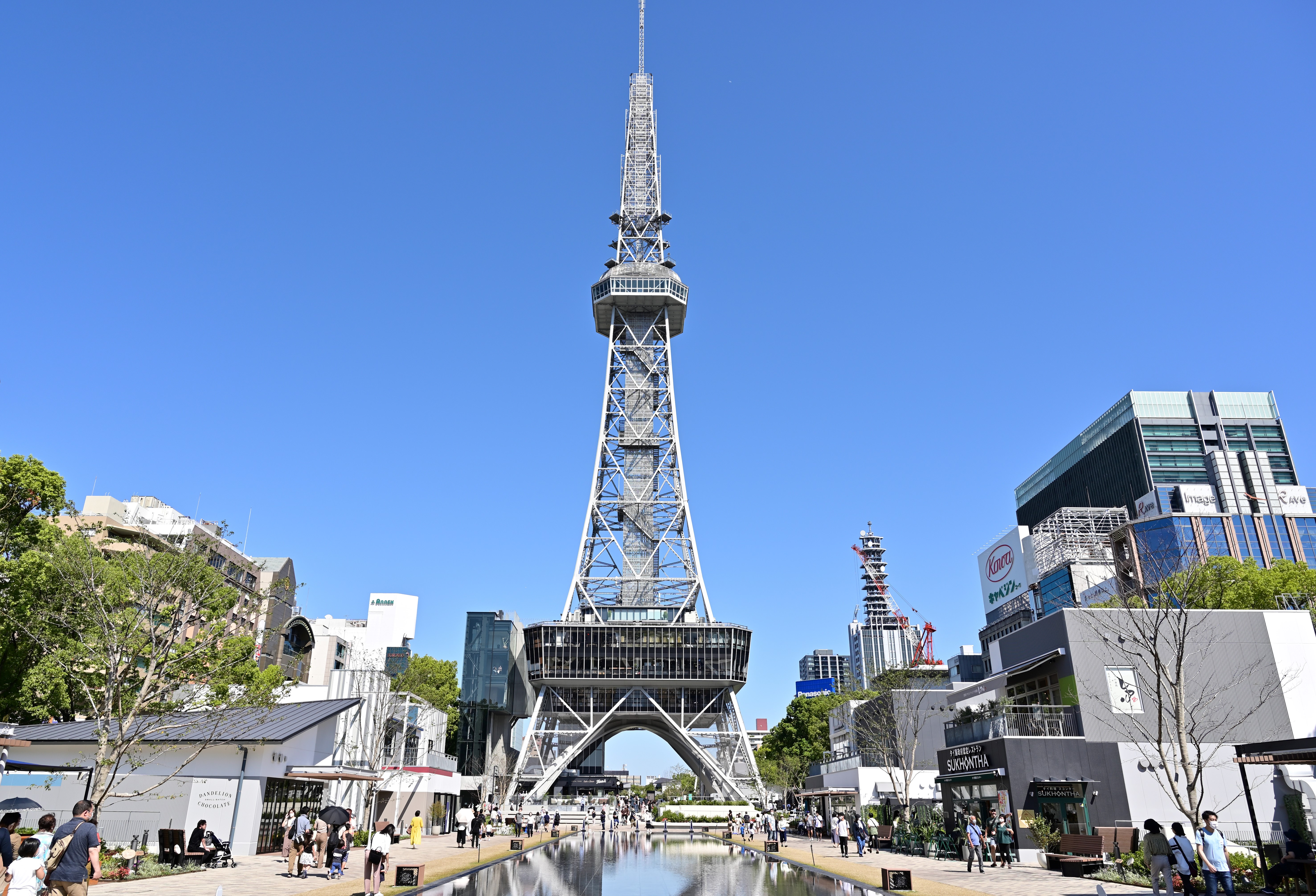
Nagoya TV Tower

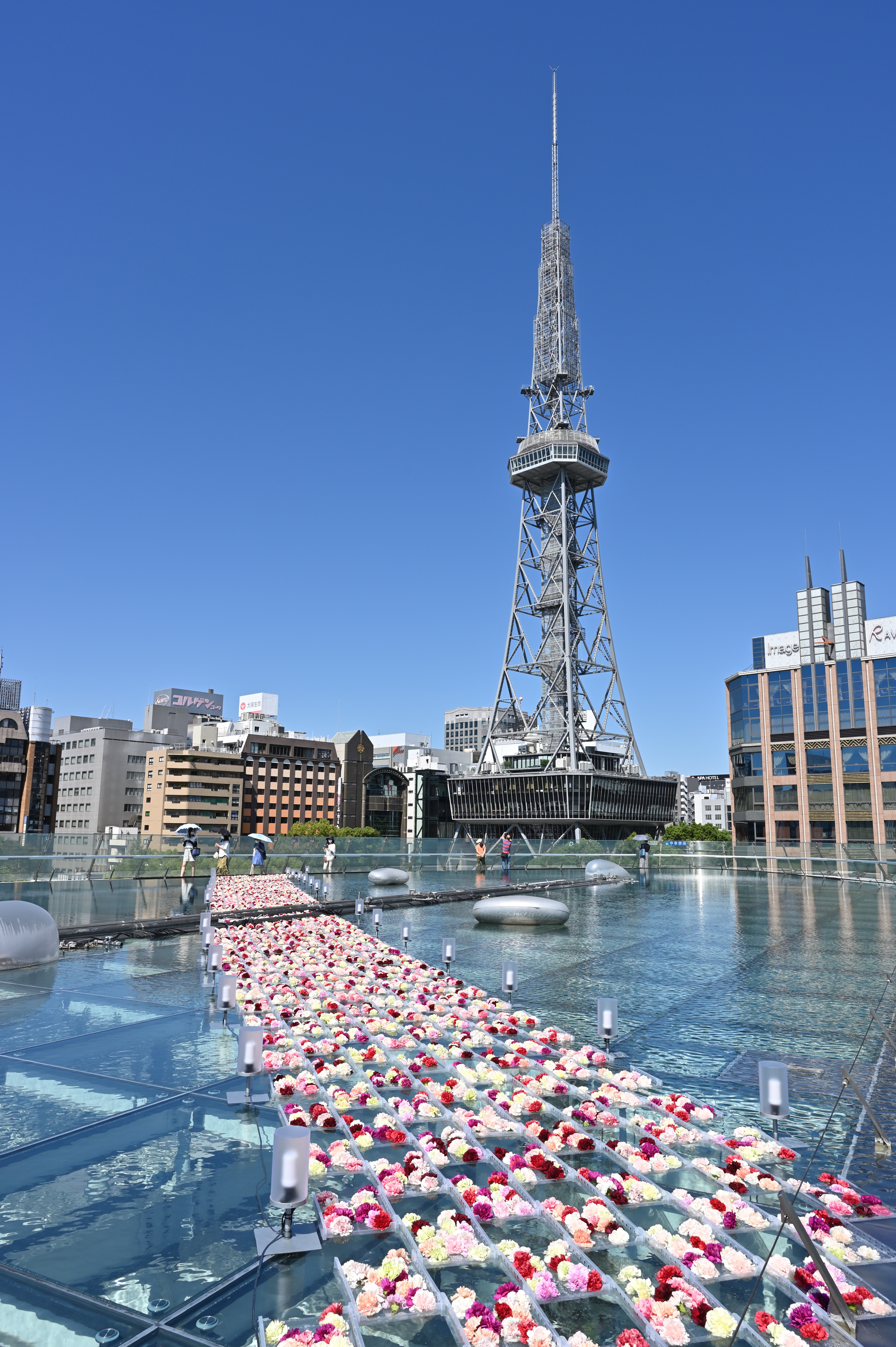
Oasis 21 and Nagoya TV Tower

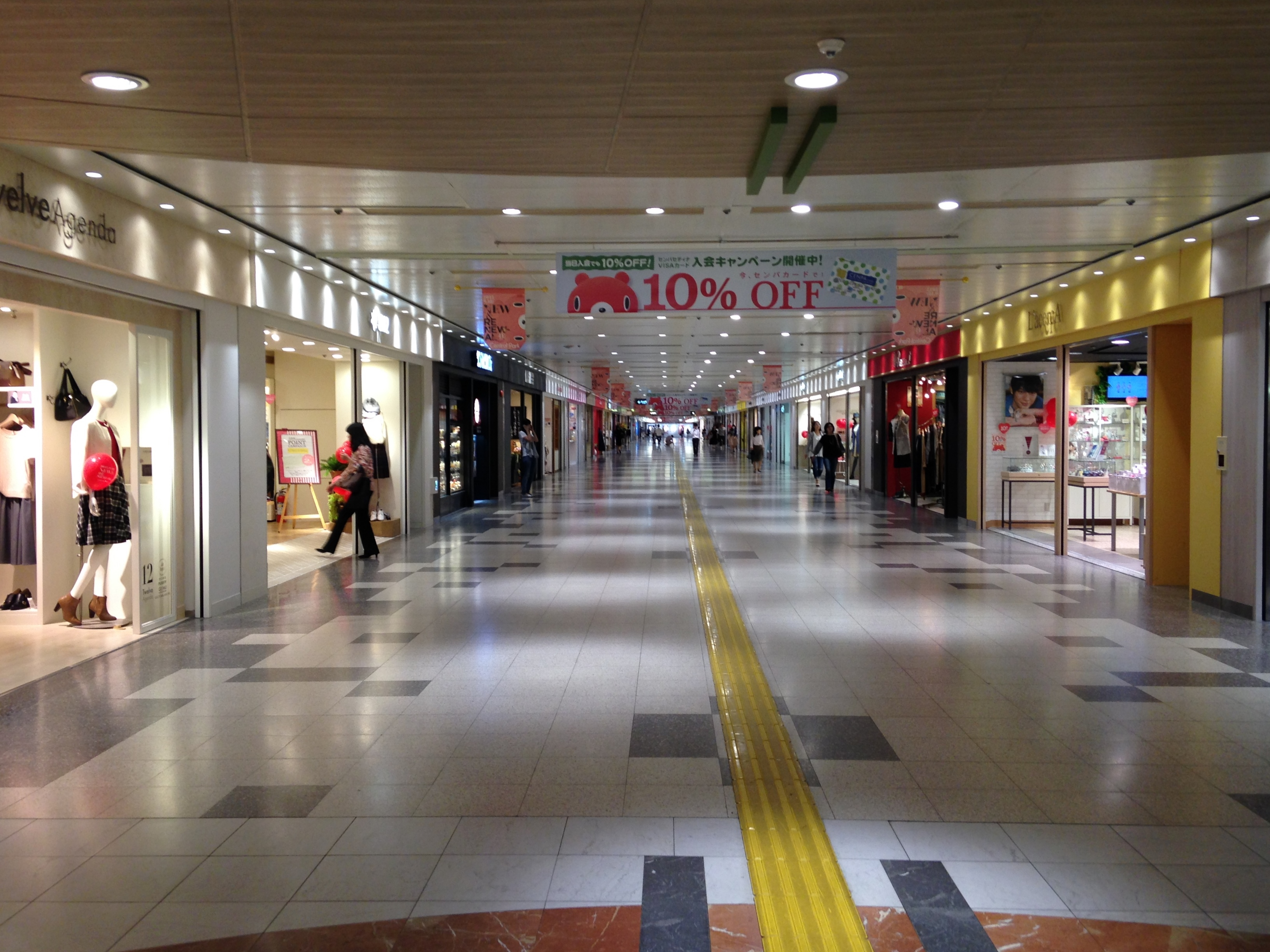
Central Park Underground City

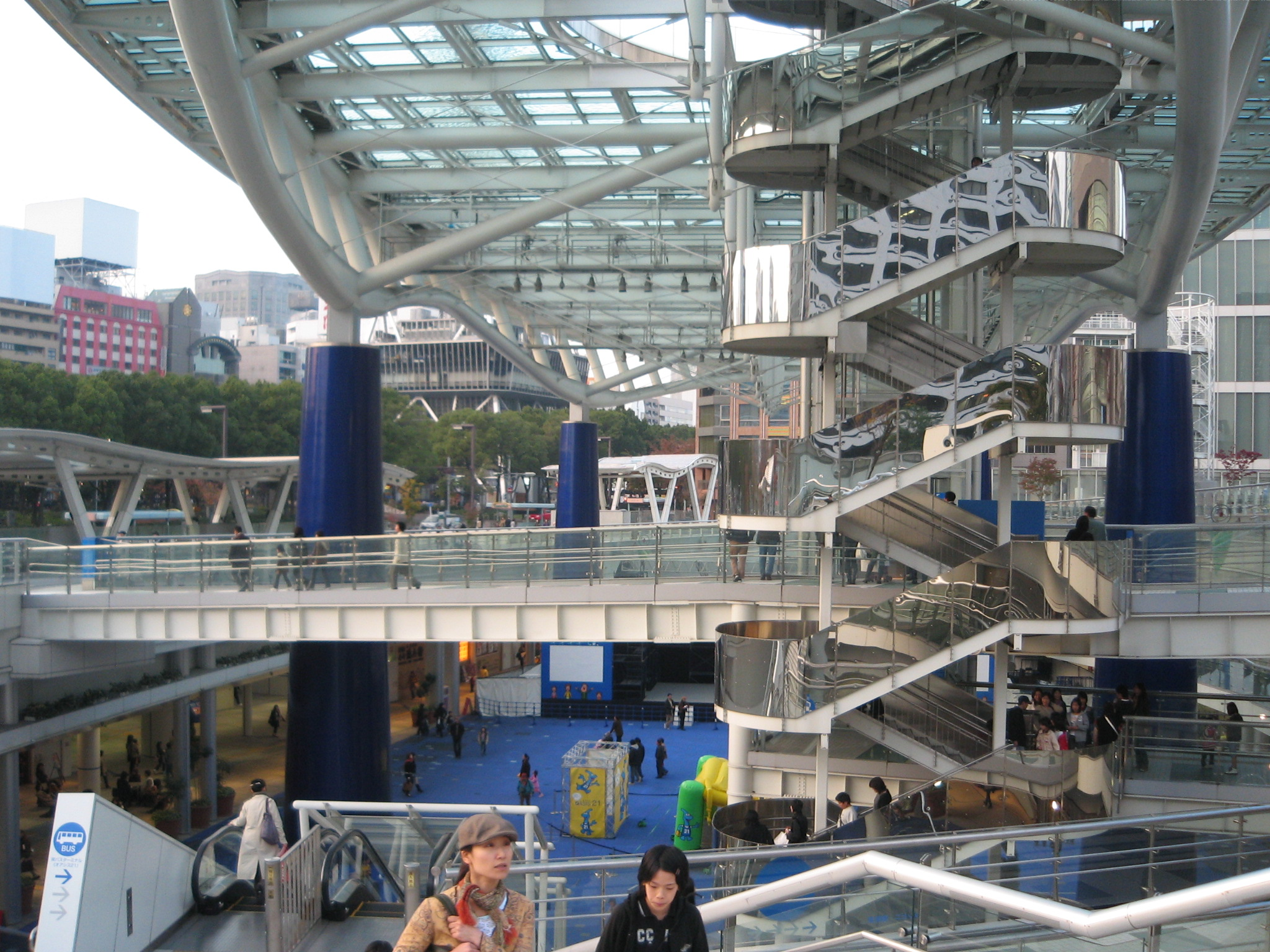
Sakae Underground City

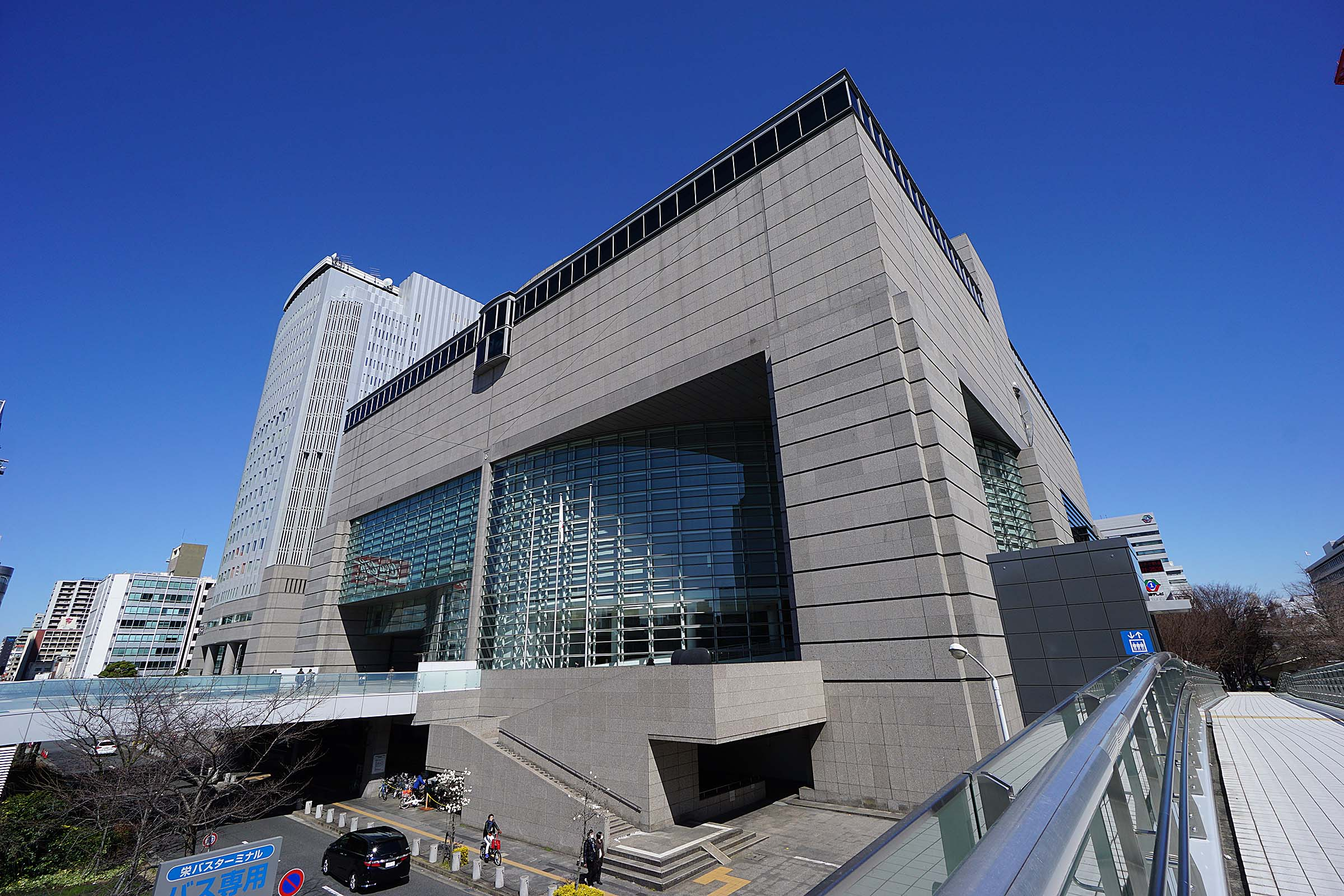
Aichi Arts Center(Aichi Prefectural Museum of Art)

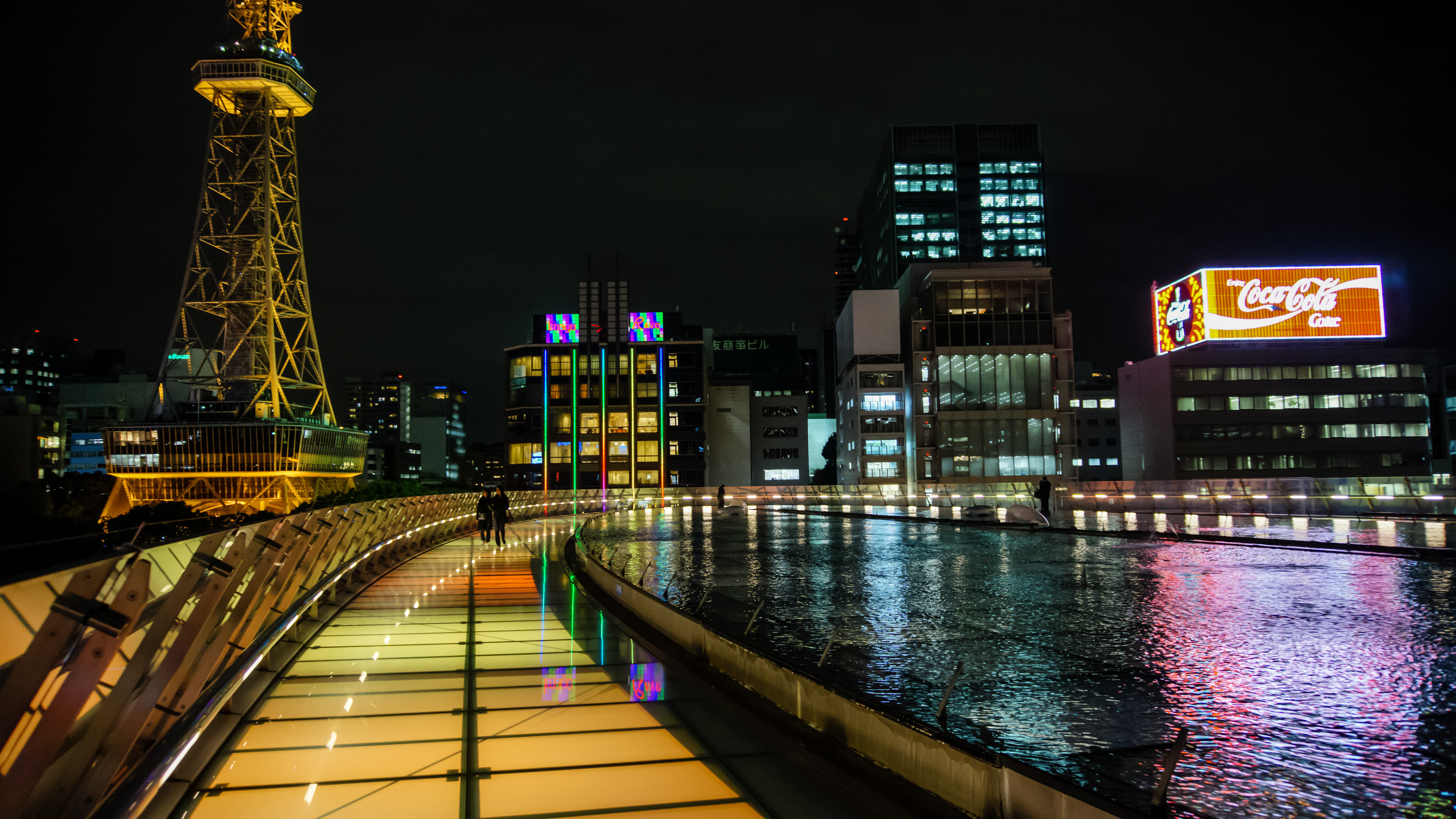
Oasis 21

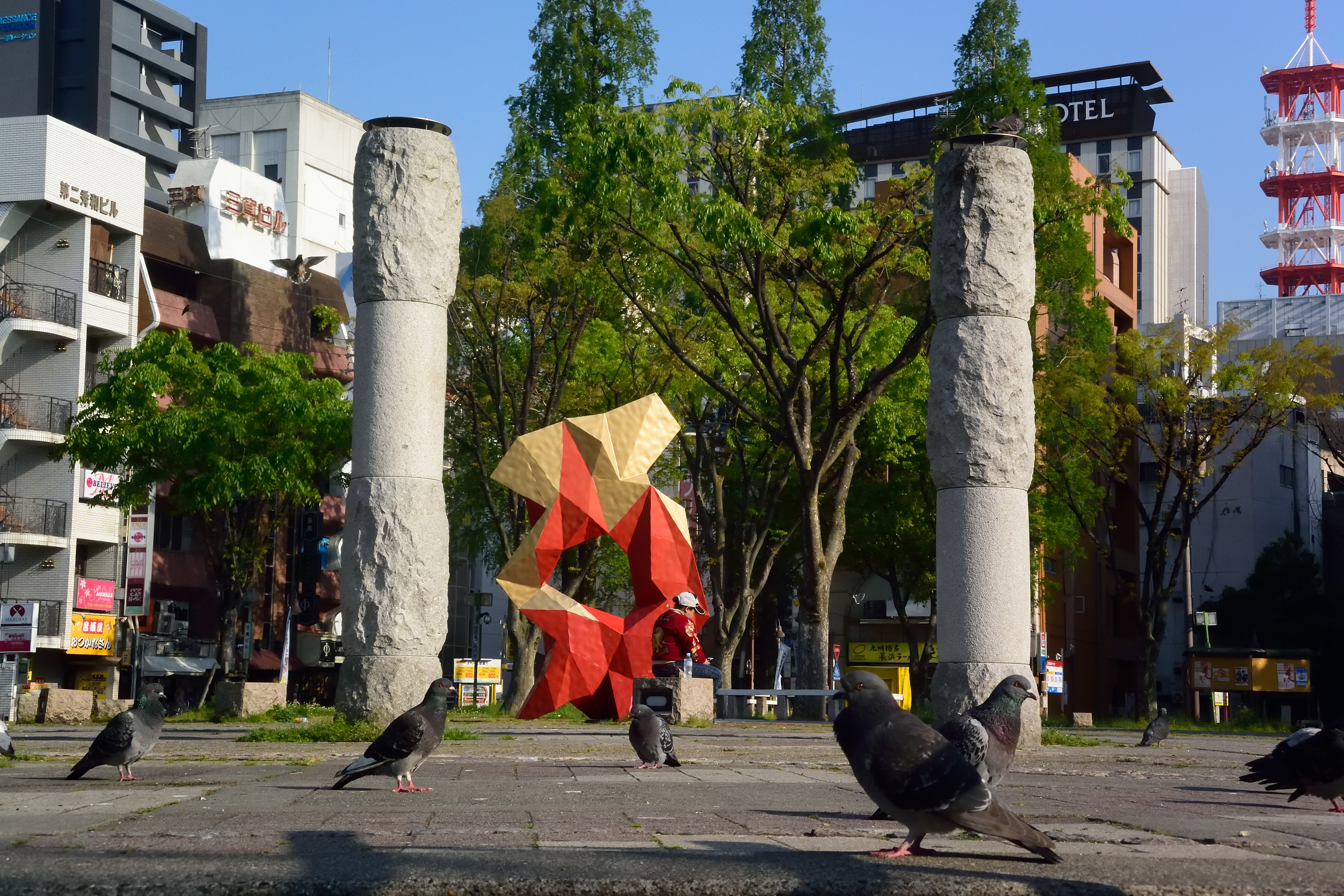
Ikeda Park

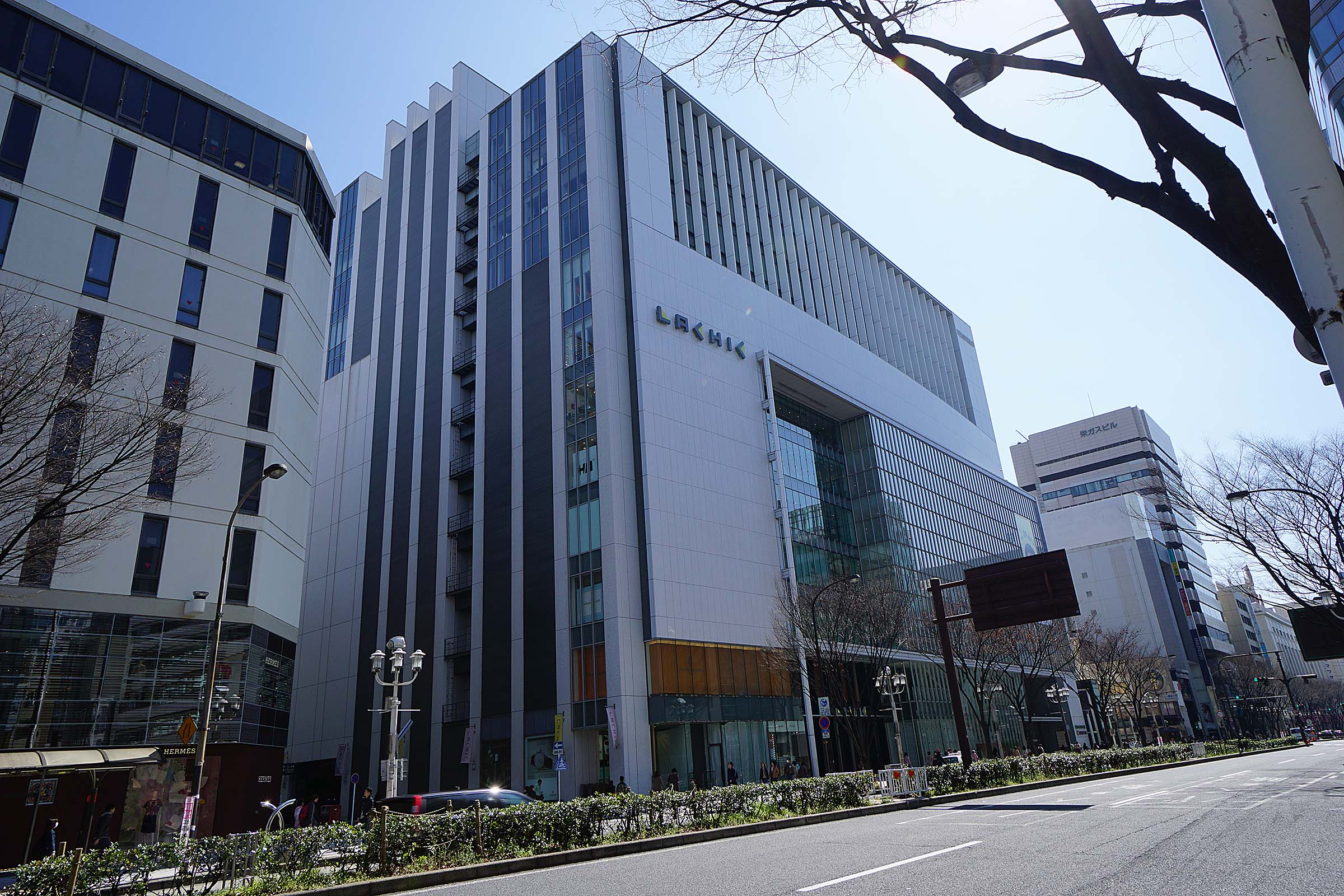
Ōtsu street

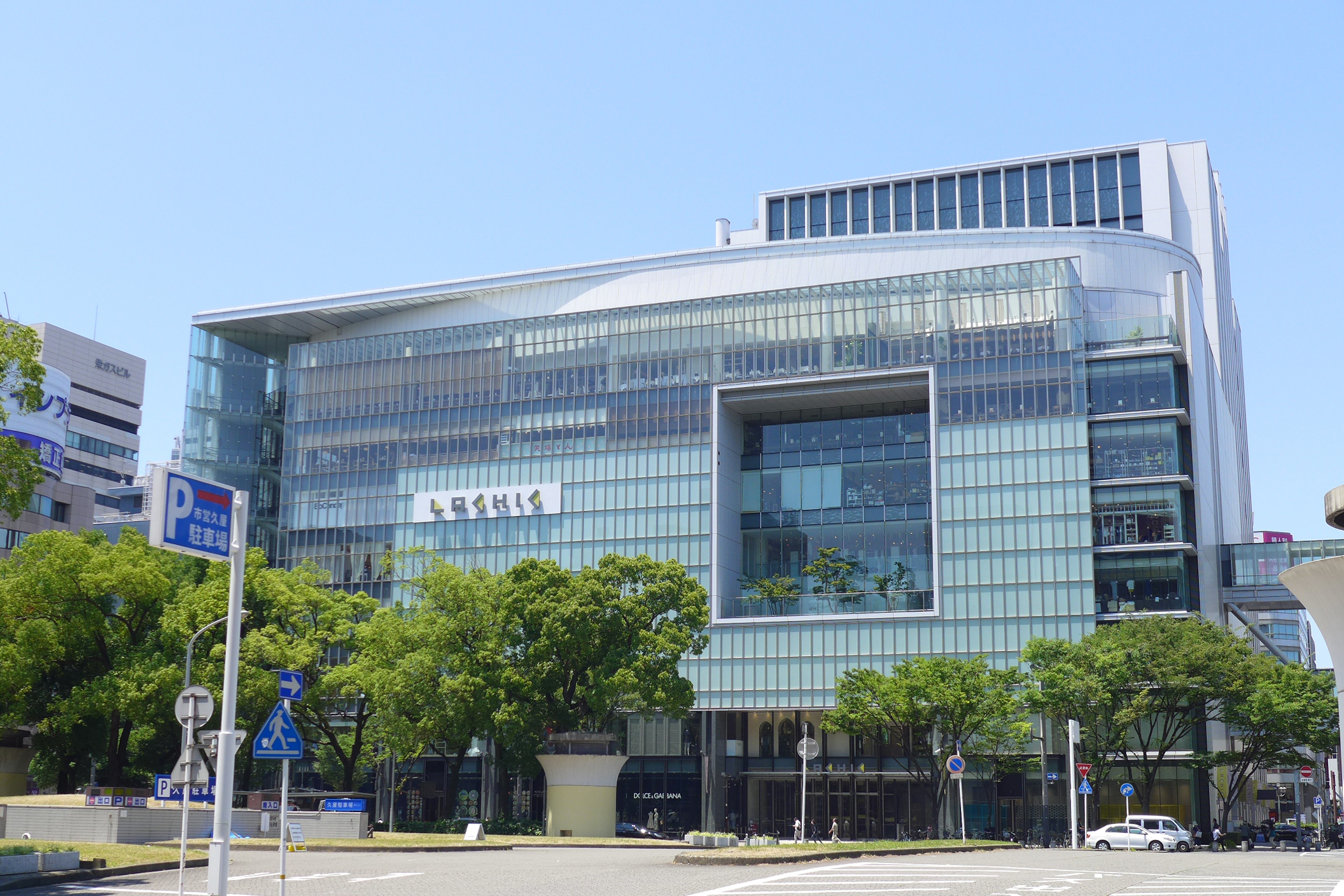
LACHIC

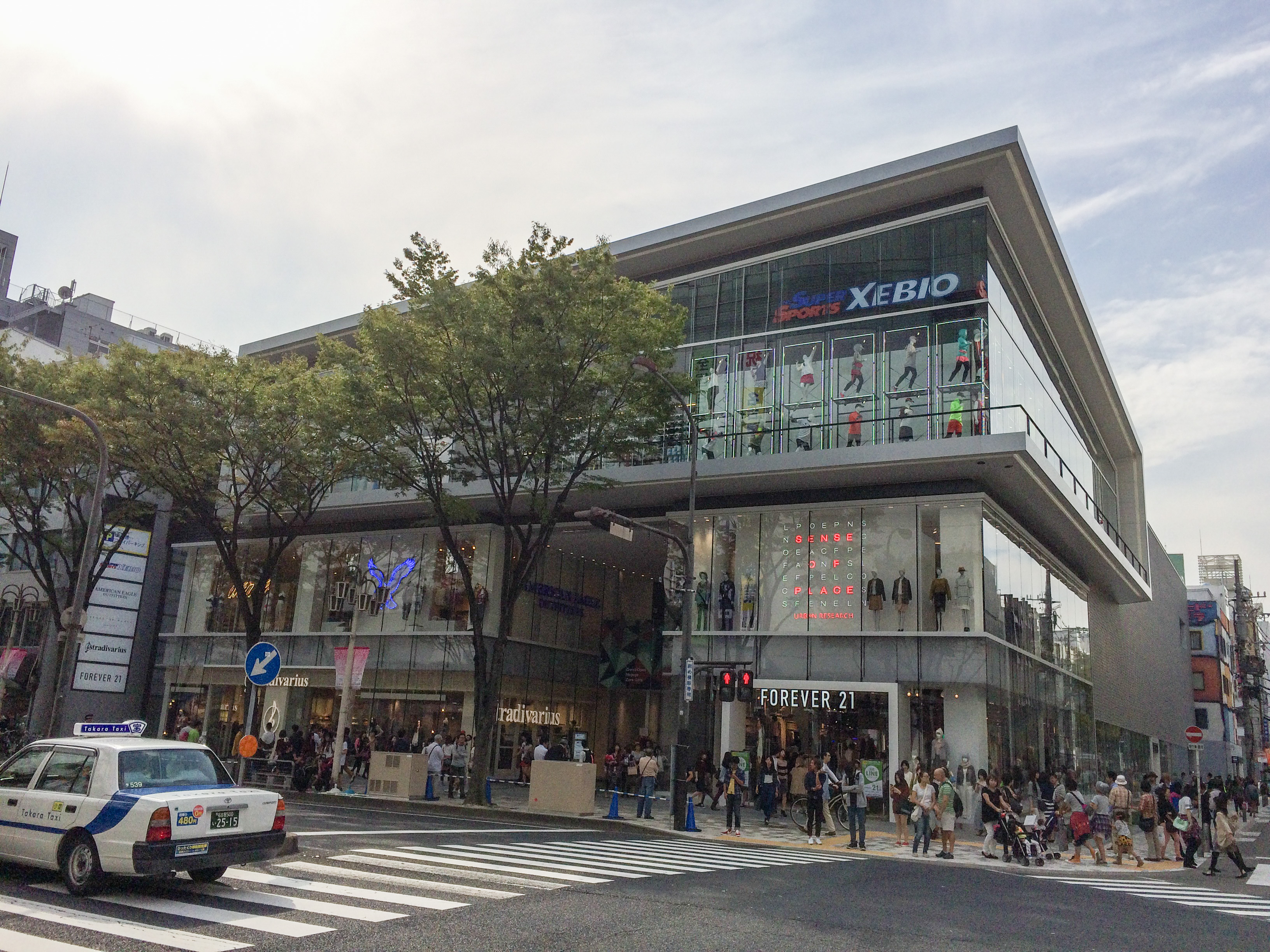
Nagoya ZERO GATE

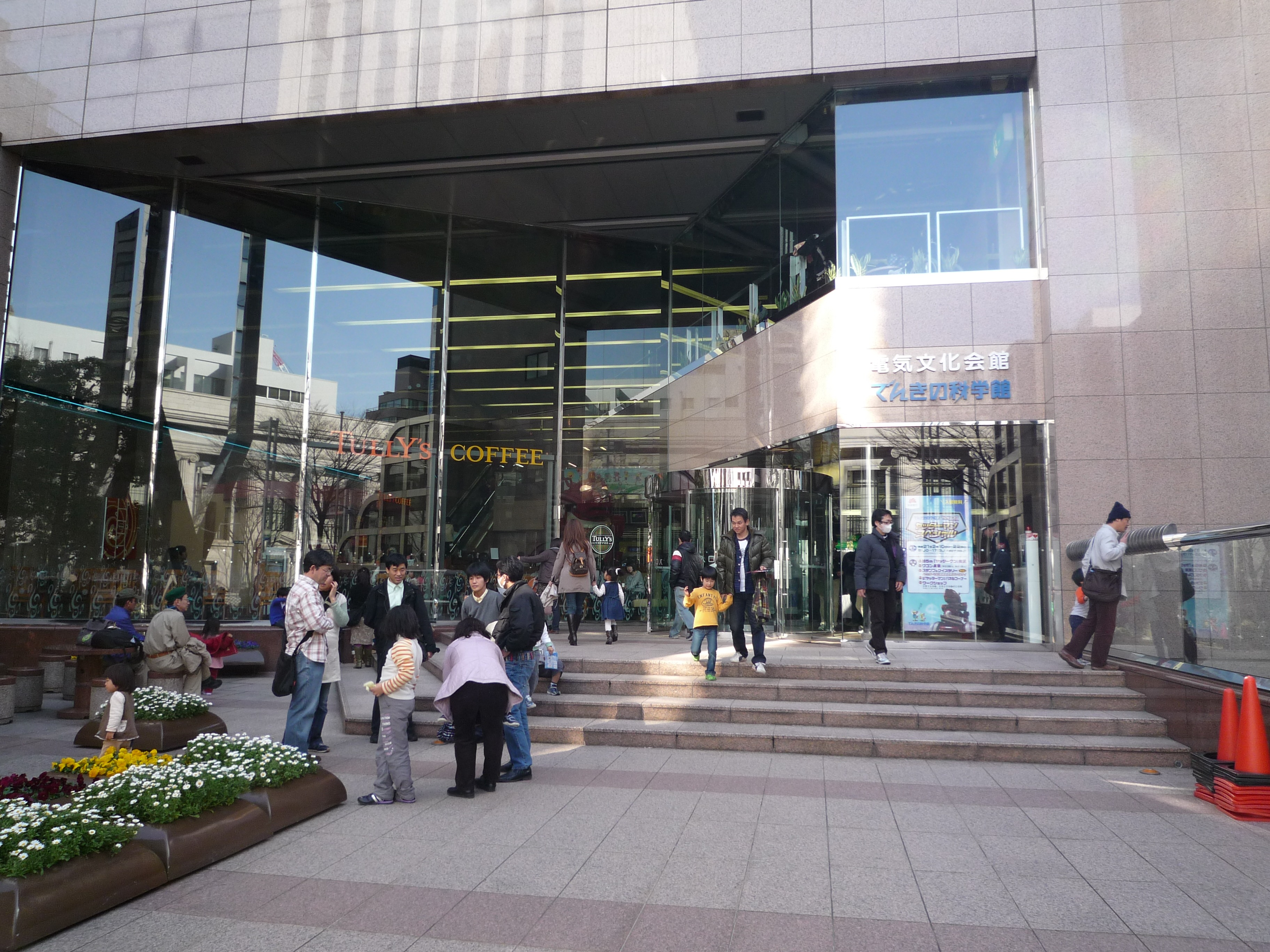
Electricity Museum, Nagoya

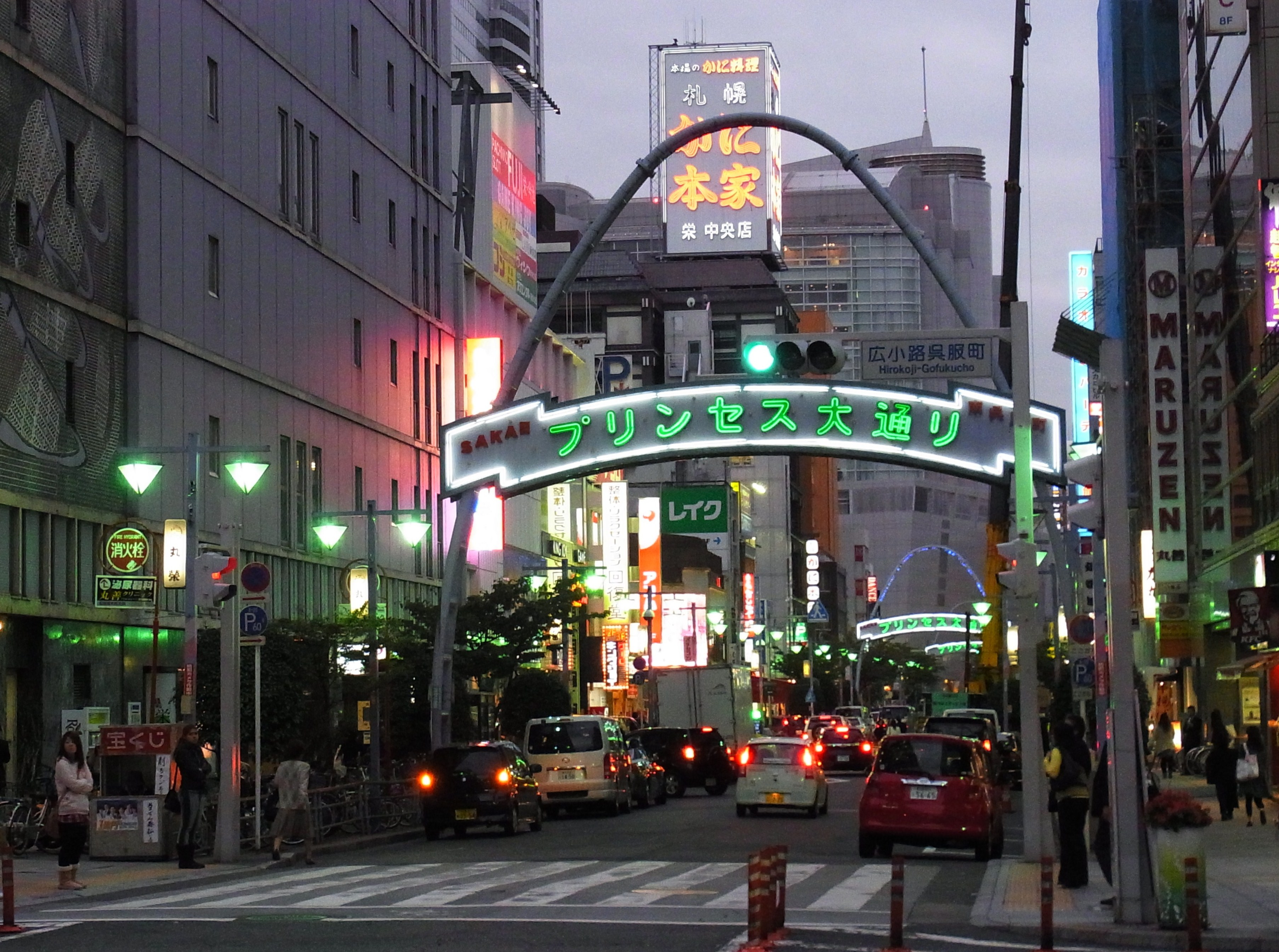
Entertainment district in Princess Street(Gofukucho streer)

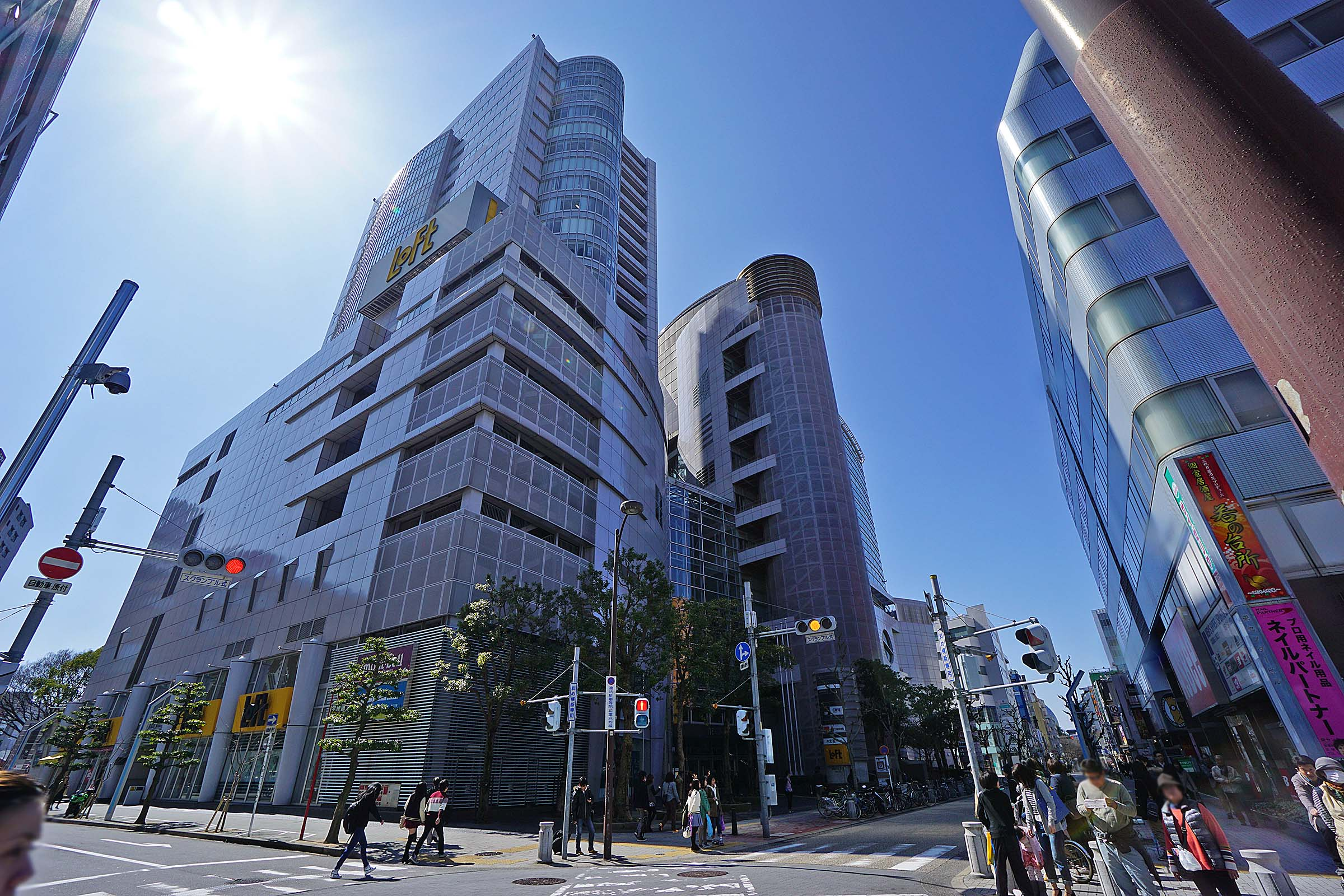
Nadya park

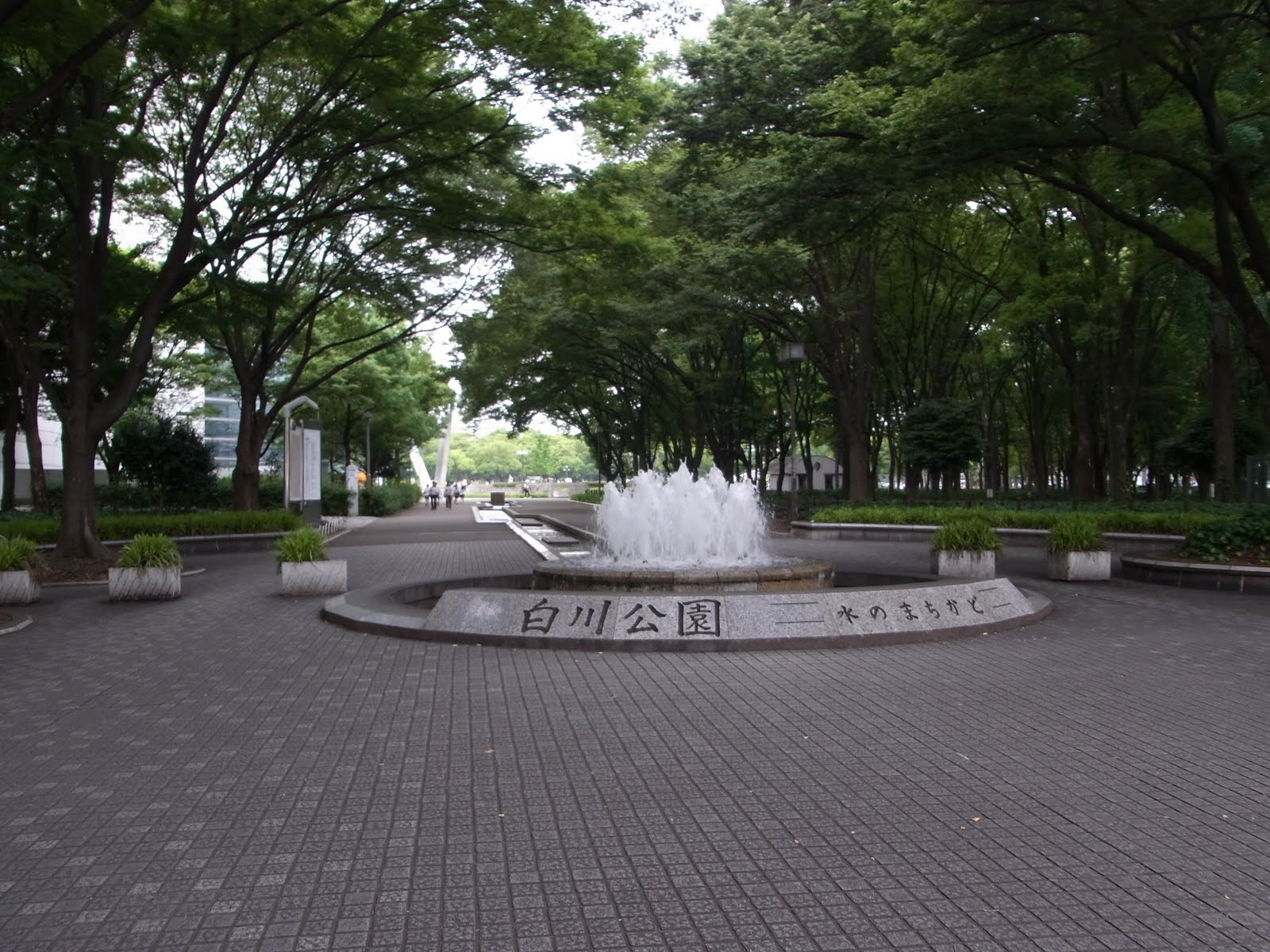
Shirakawa Park

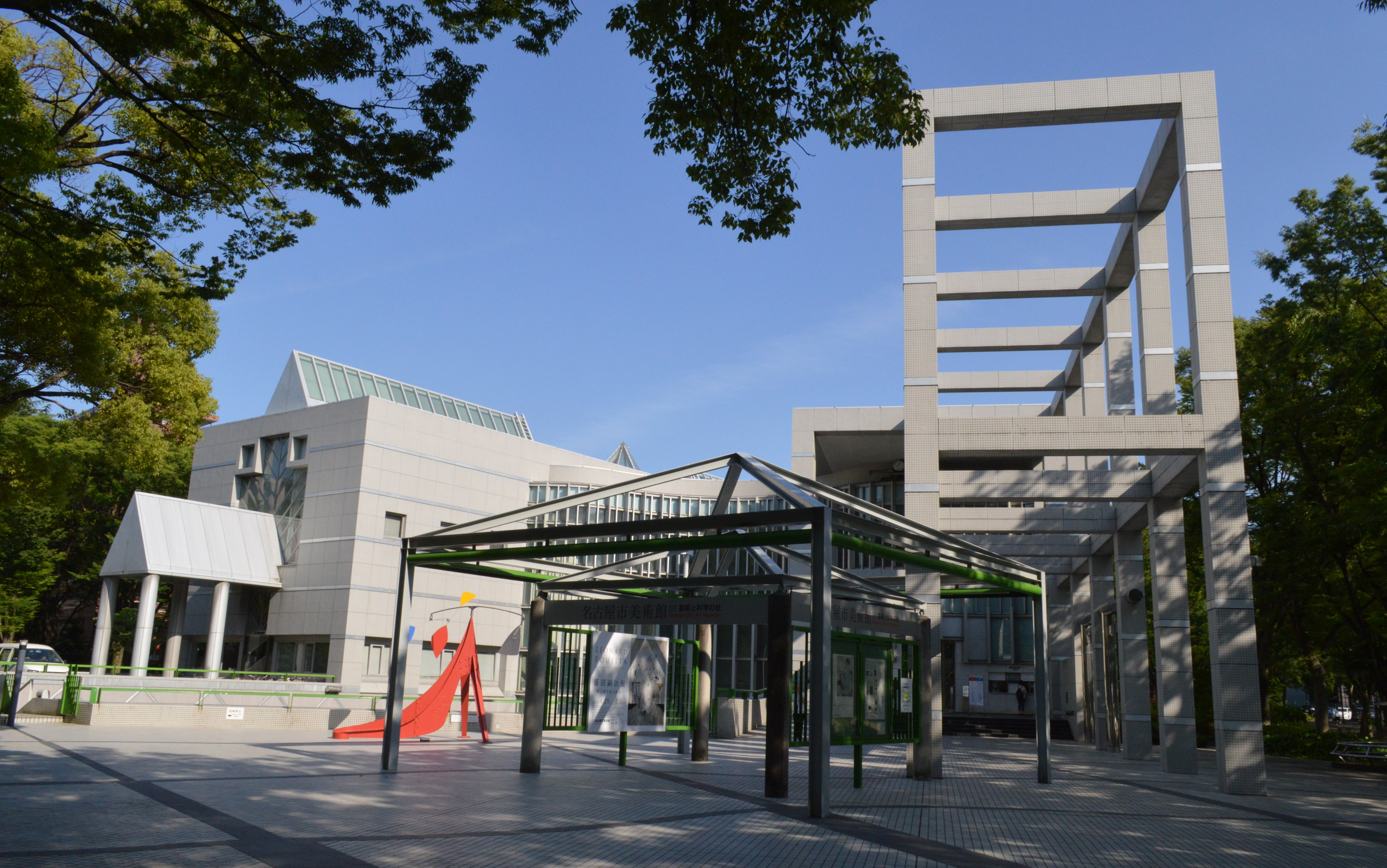
Nagoya City Art Museum

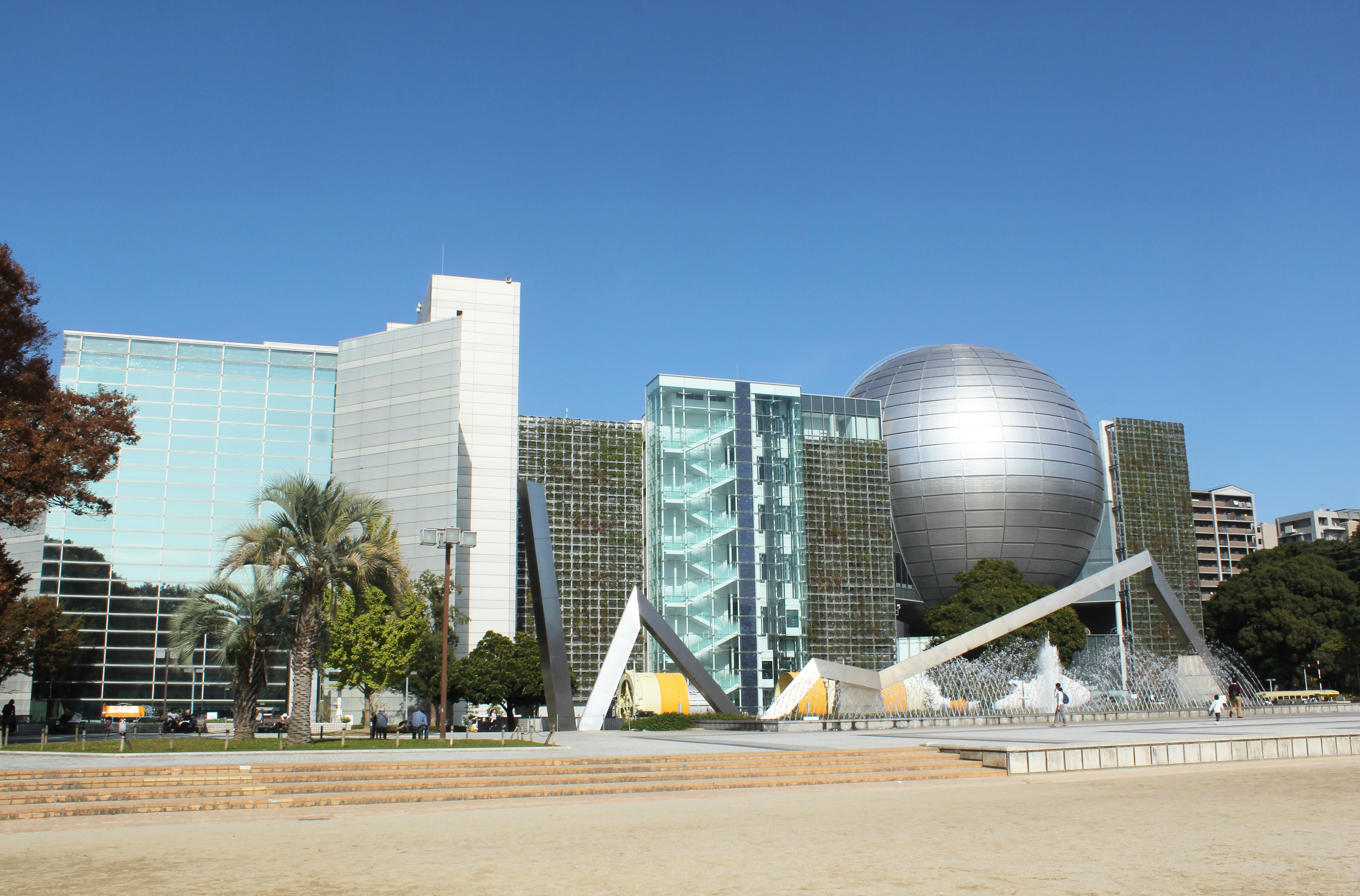
Nagoya City Science Museum

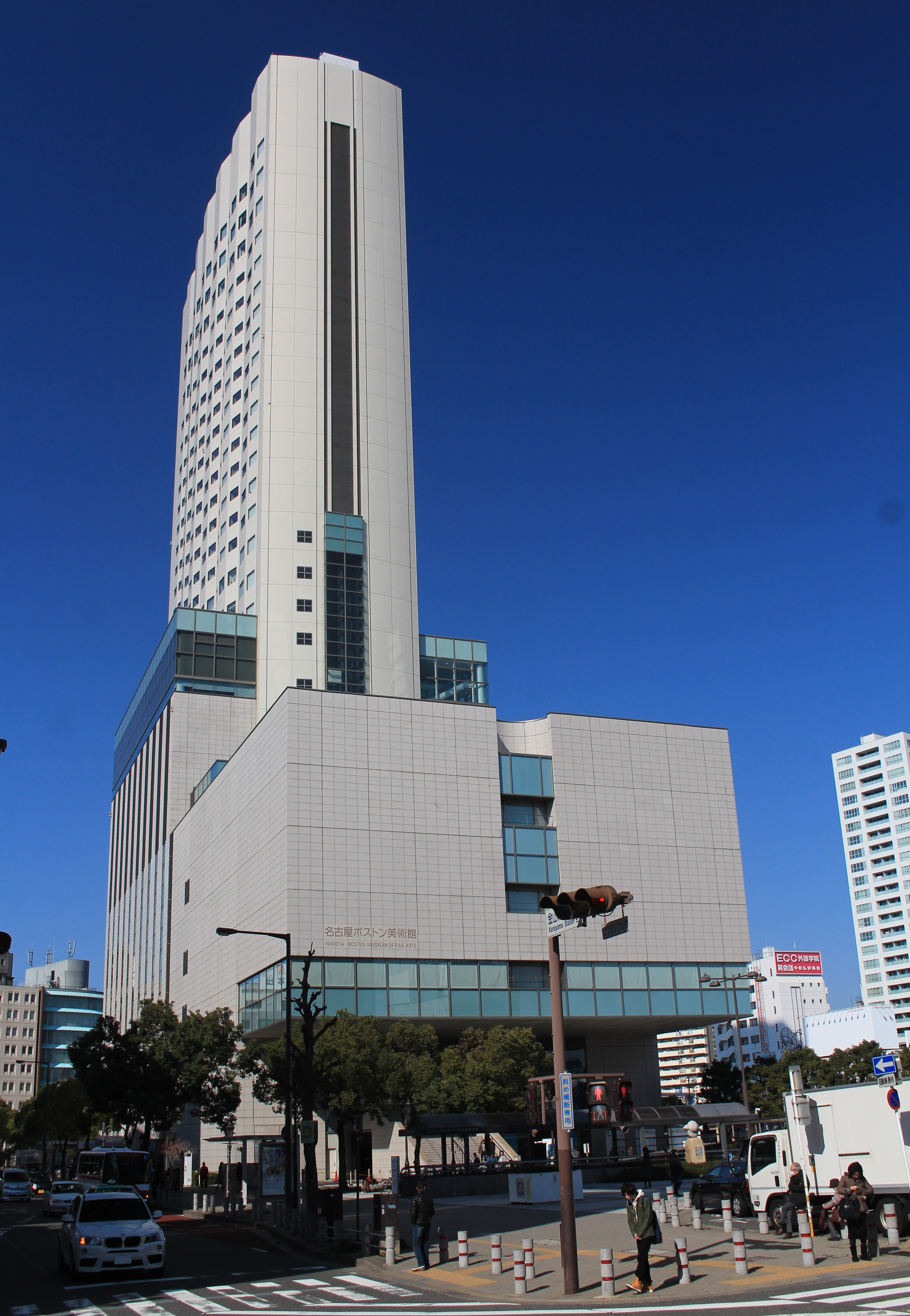
Nagoya/Boston Museum of Fine Arts

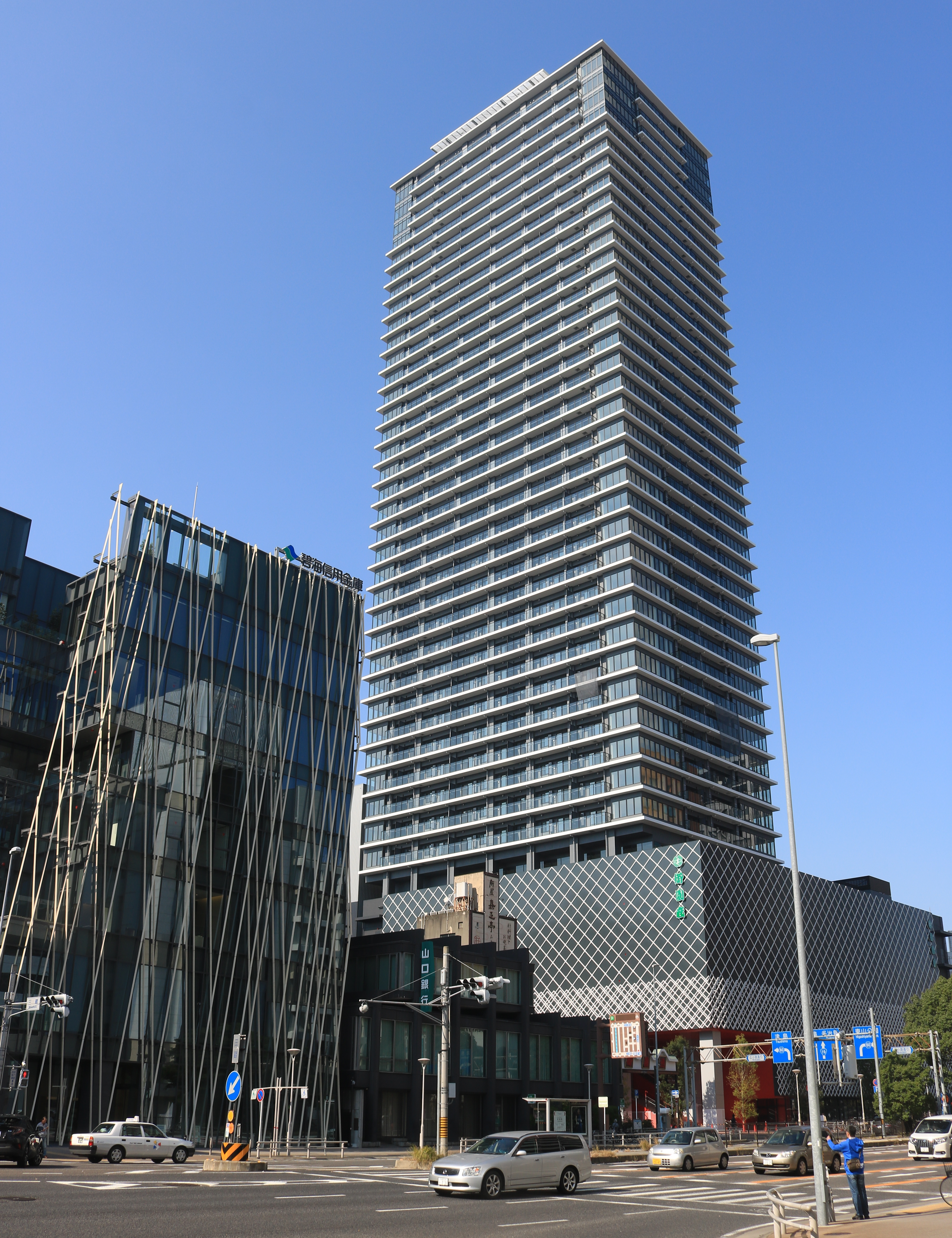
Misono-za

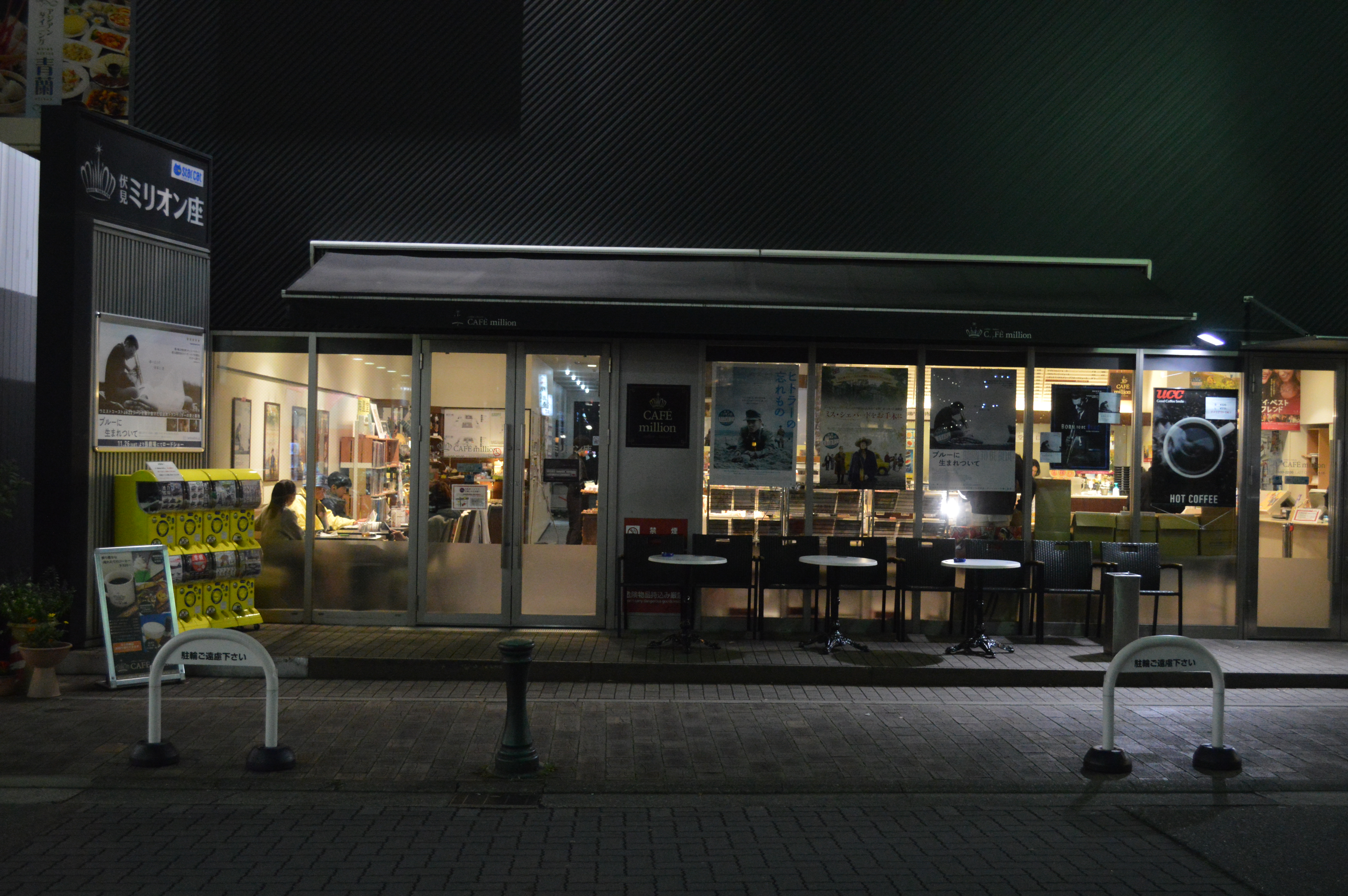
Fusimi Million-za

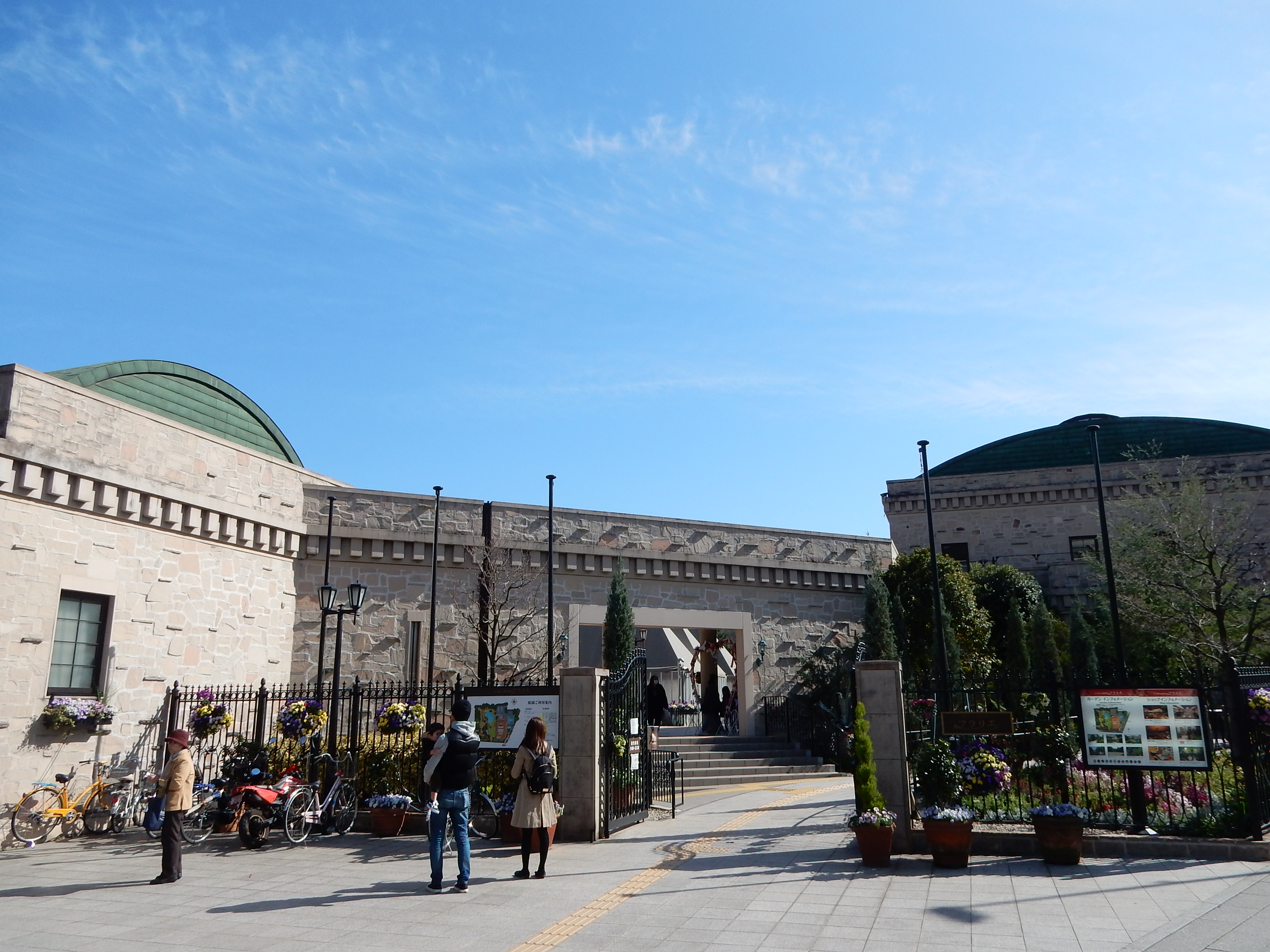
Hisaya-odori Garden Flarie(Ran no Yakata)

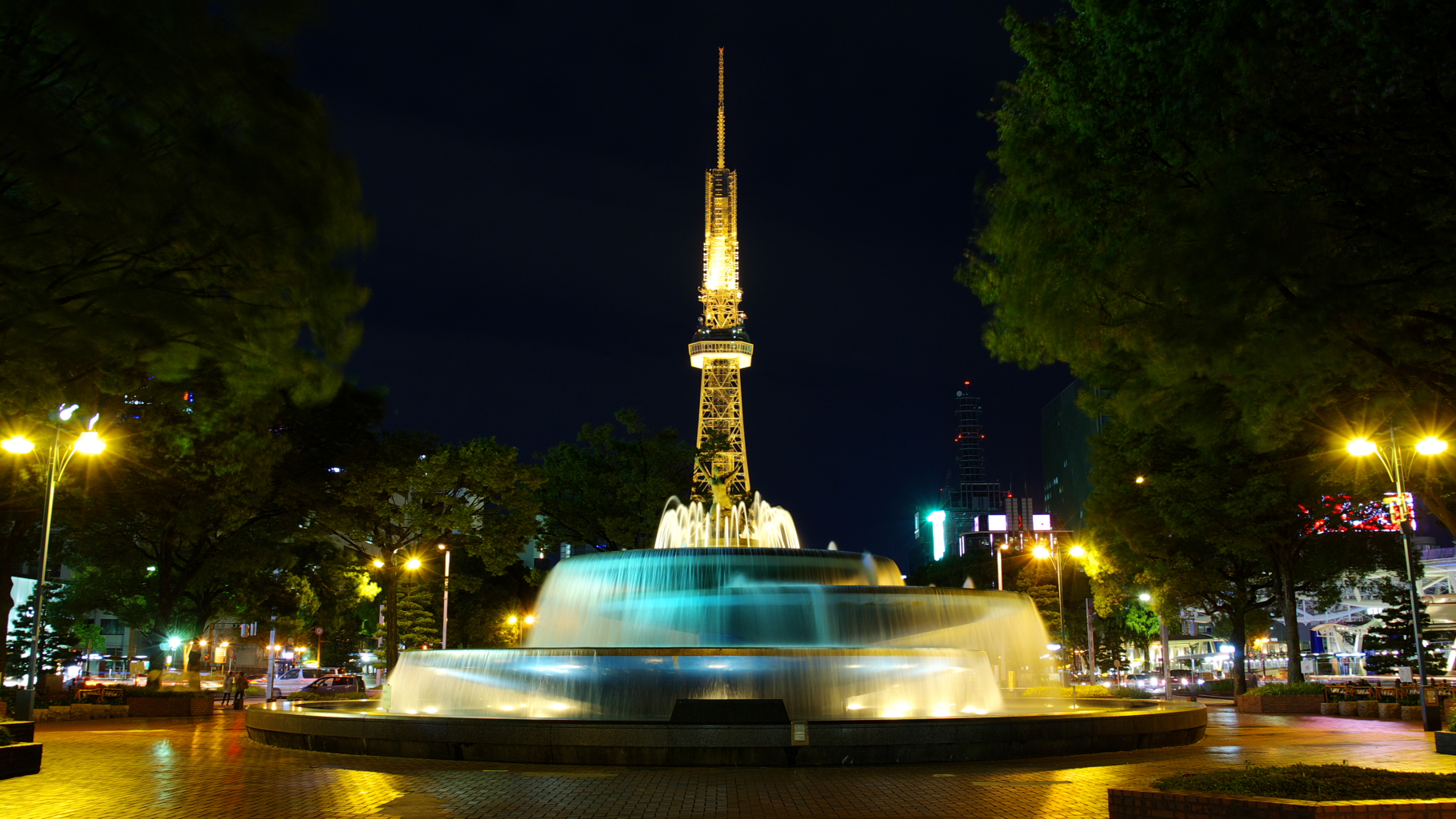
Hisaya Ōdori Park

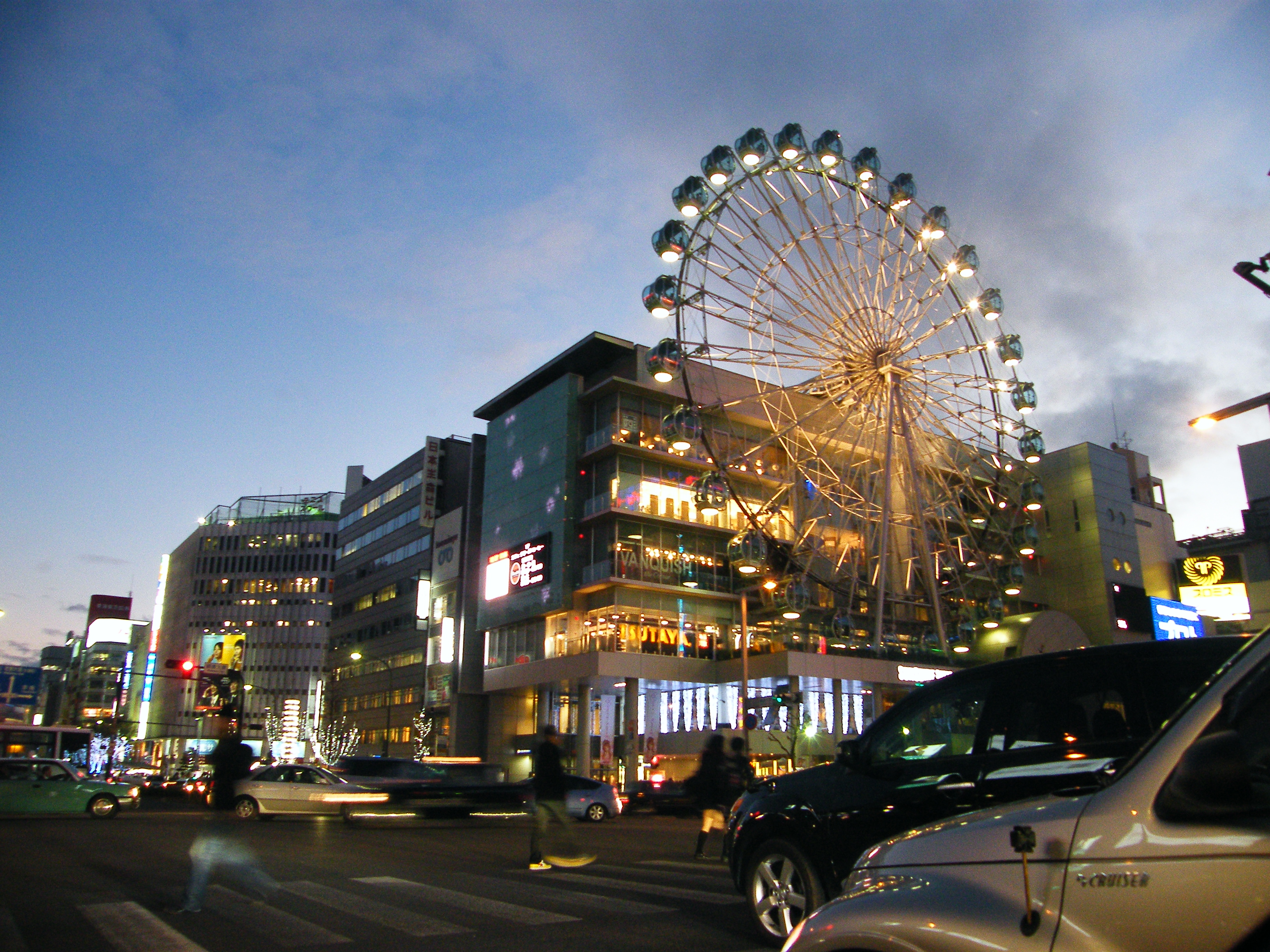
Sunshine Sakae

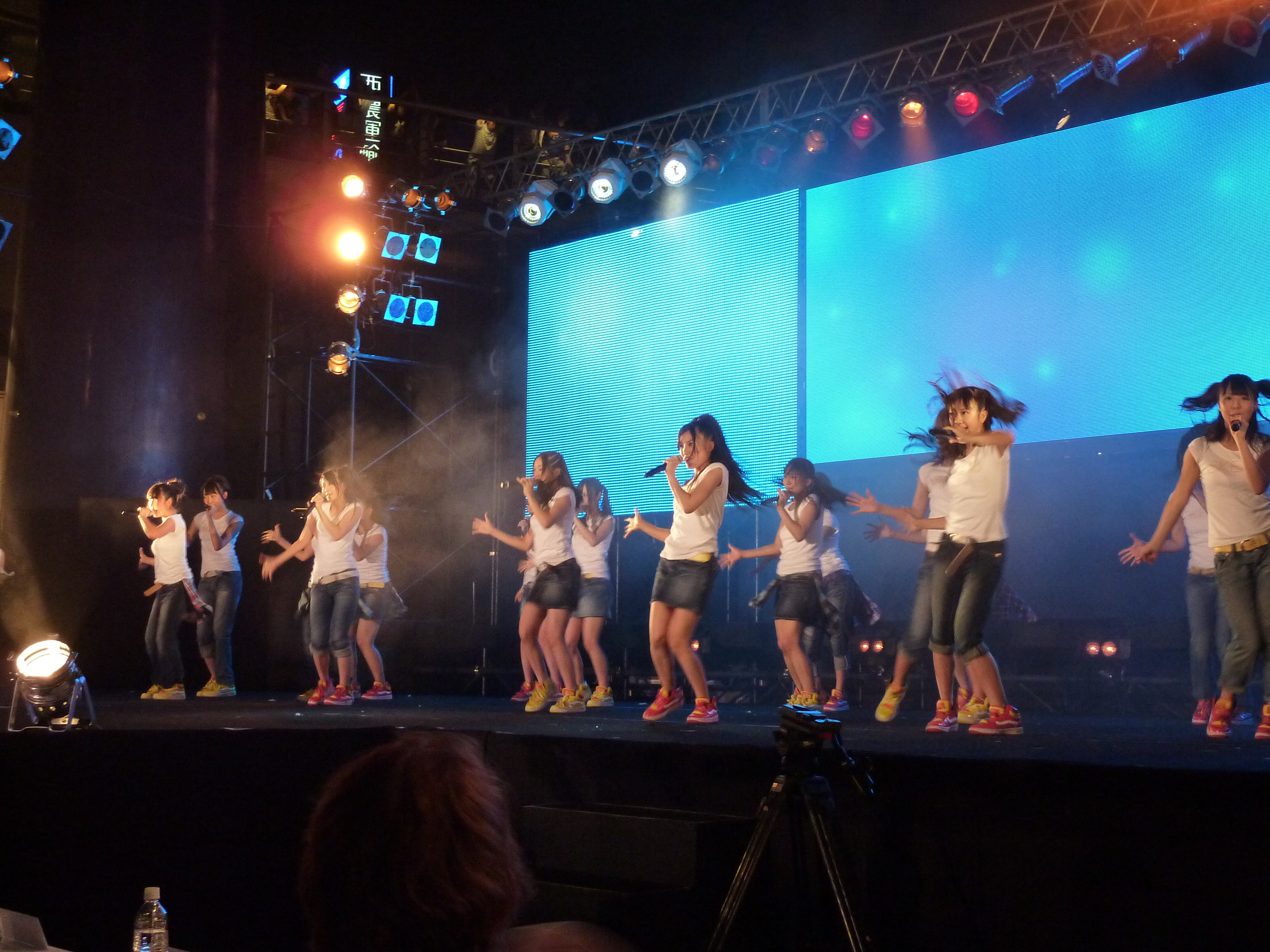
SKE48

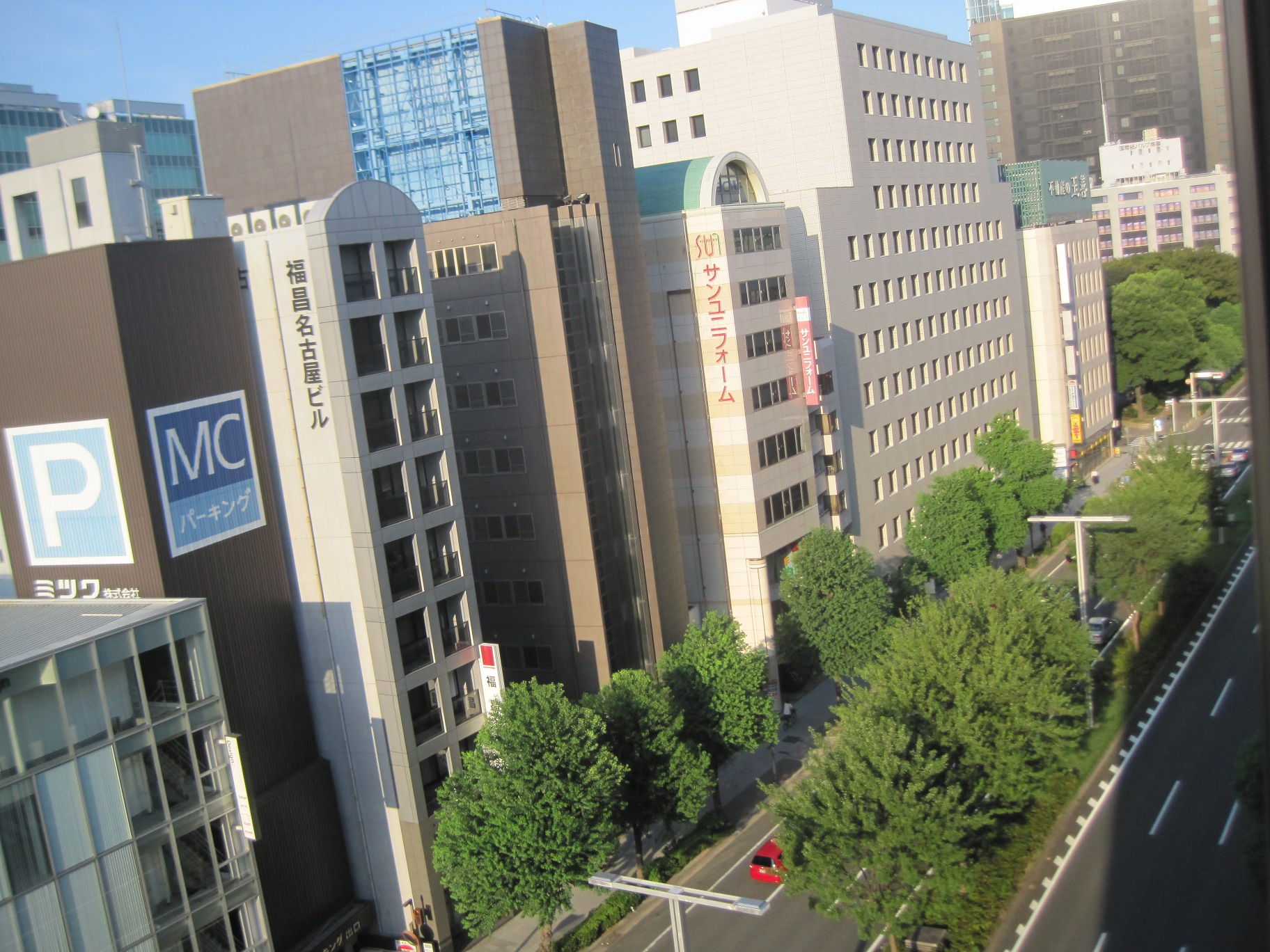
Nisiki Street

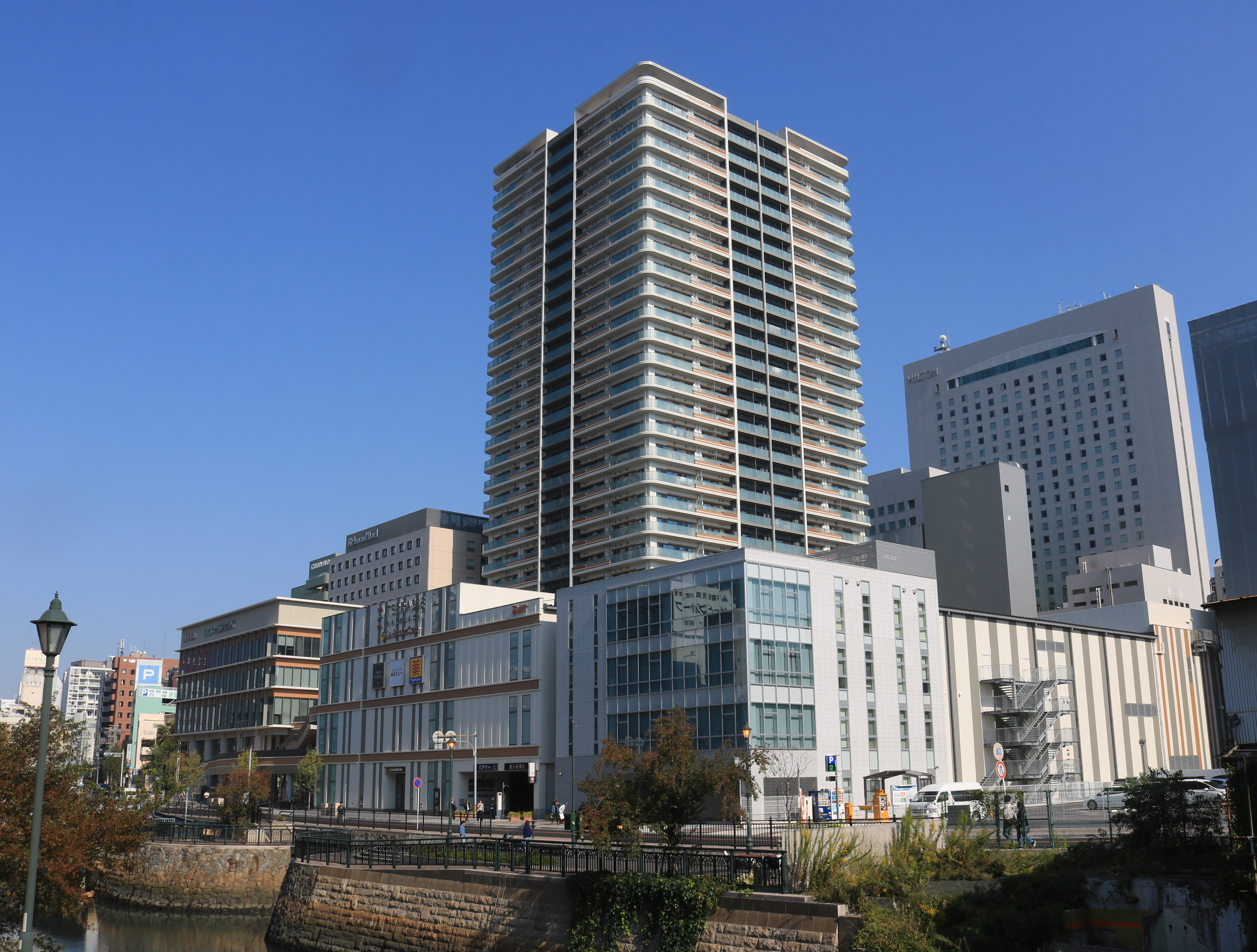
Terrasse Nayabashi

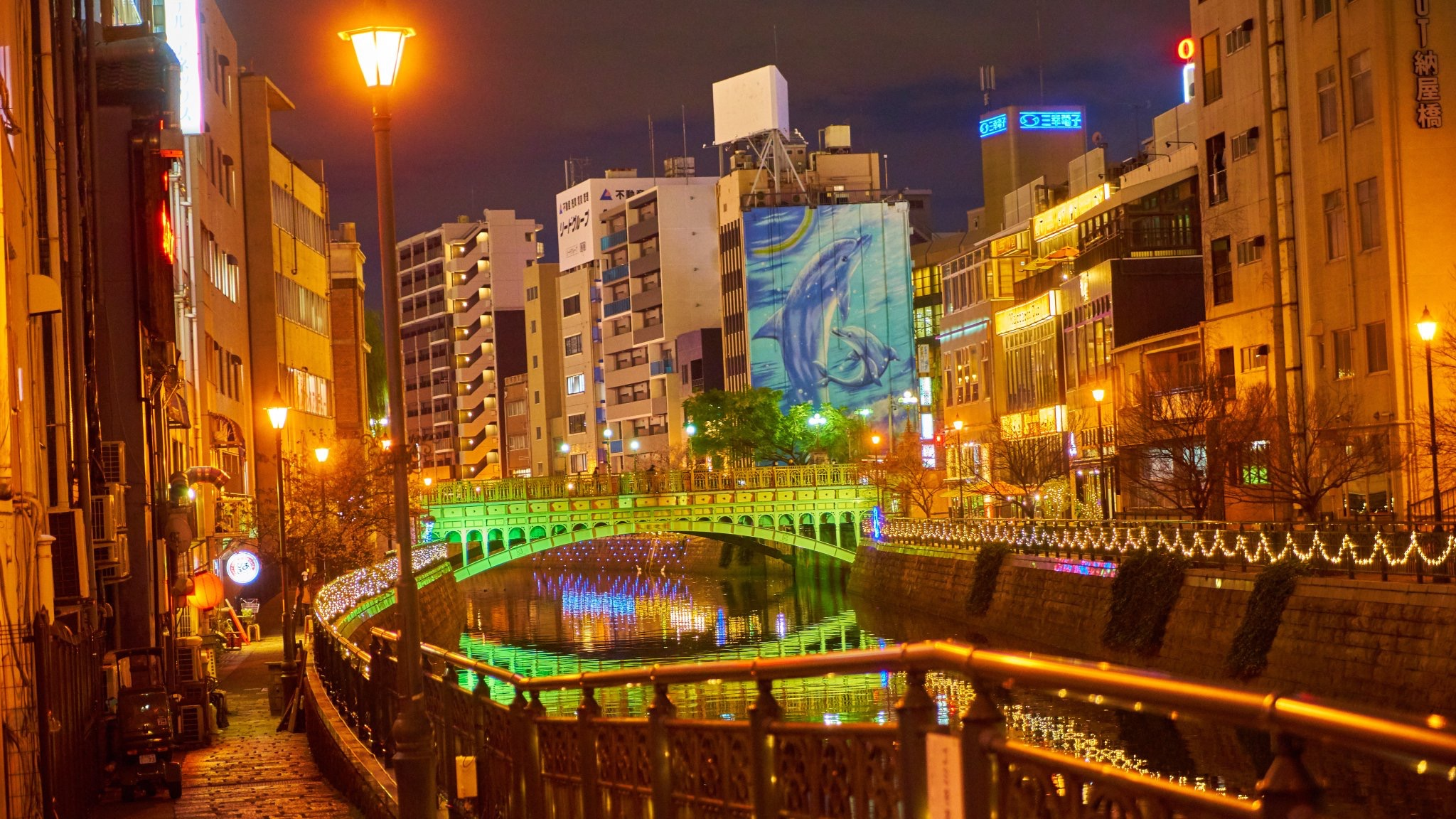
Nayabashi

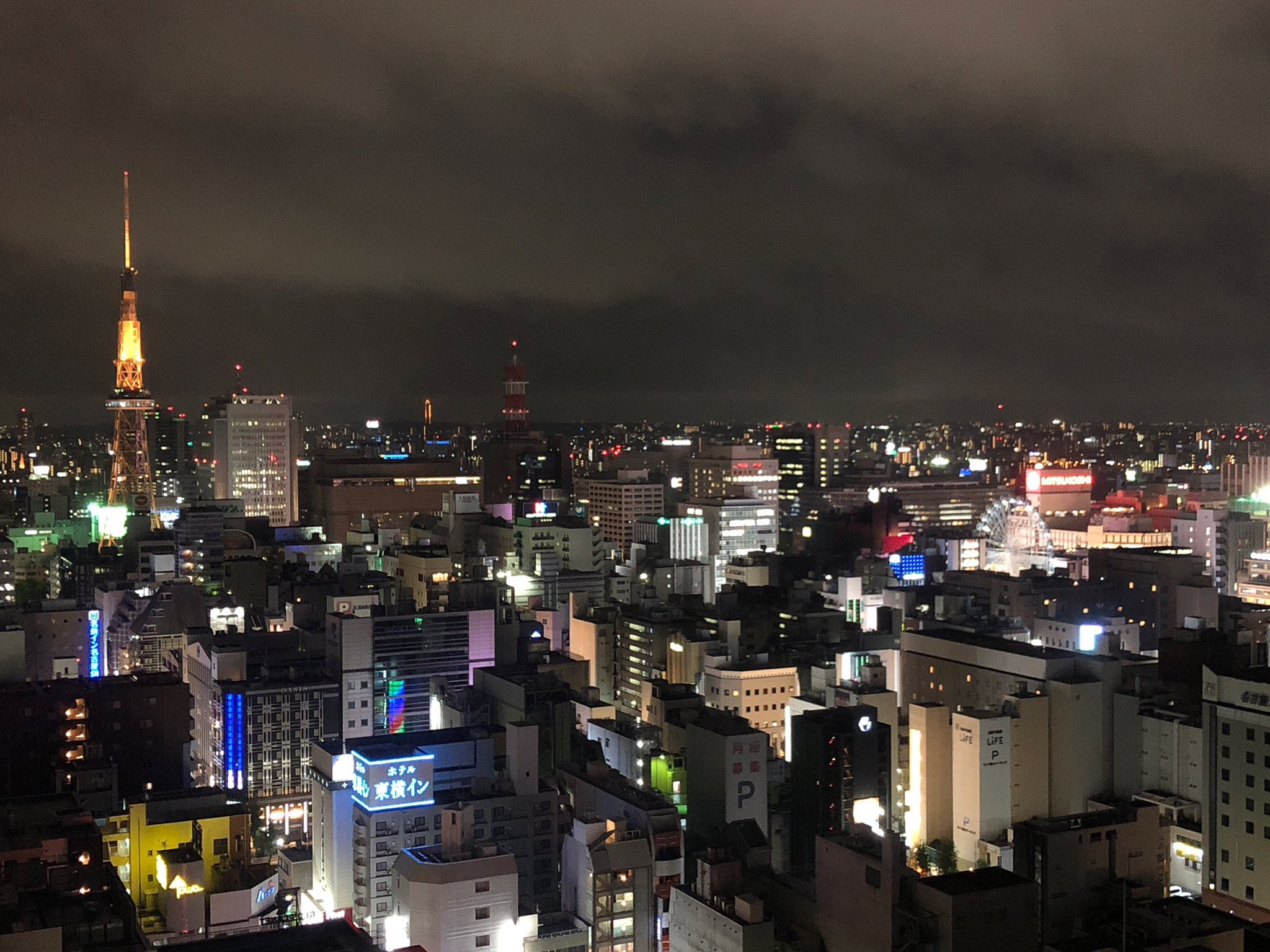
Sakae Night

== Noted people ==
- Oda Nobunaga – samurai during the Sengoku period
- Midori Ito – professional figure skater
- Kanako Murakami – professional figure skater
- Shoma Uno – professional figure skater
- Hiroshi Tachi –actor, singer
