= Ran no Yakata =

Orchid garden in Nagoya, Japan

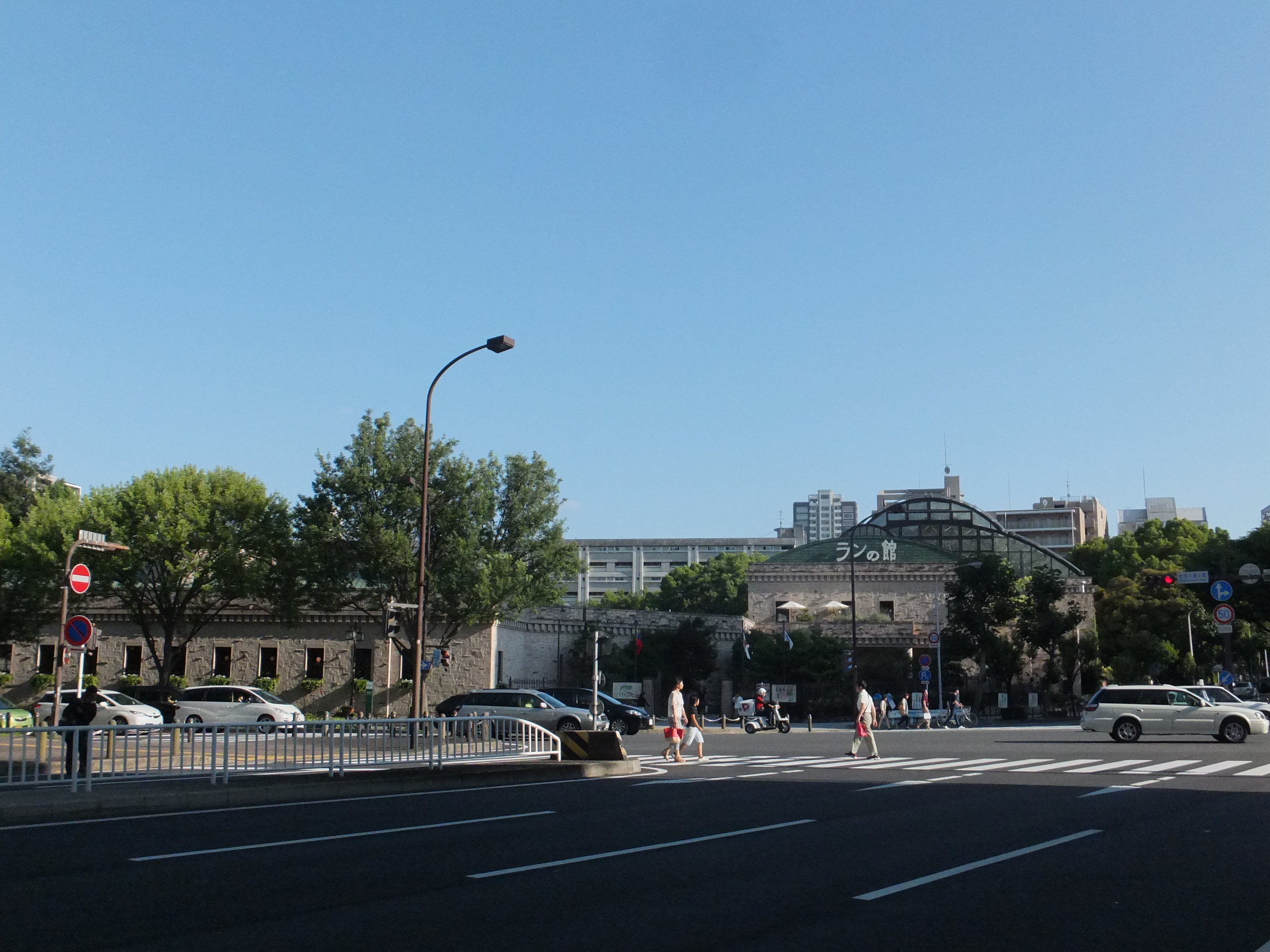
Ran no Yakata

Ran no Yakata (ランの館) is a public orchid garden in Nagoya, central Japan.

Open in May 1998. The gardens have more than 250 different species of orchids, displayed in a large glasshouse. The common and most rare orchids are exhibited here. The gardens also host horticultural events. A decrease of visitors, it has been closed by March 31, 2014. The renewed, and scheduled to open in September 26, 2014 as Hisaya-ōdōri Gardens Flarie（久屋大通庭園）.

Access by public transport is Yabachō Station on the Meijō Line.
