= Great Daruma =

Portrait by Japanese artist Hokusai

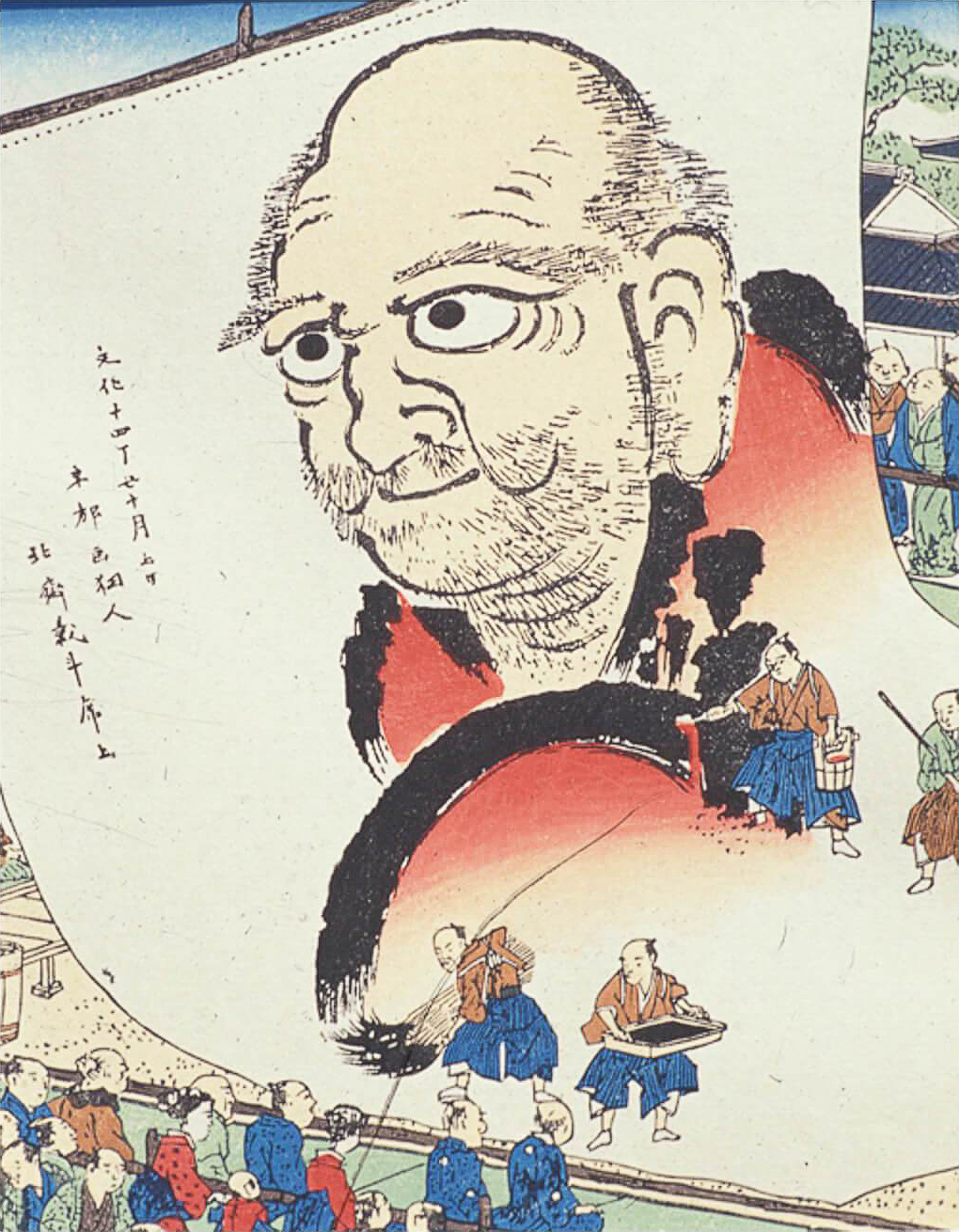
Contemporary print, depicting Hokusai painting the Great Daruma in 1817

The Great Daruma was a monumental portrait created by Japanese artist Hokusai on 5 October 1817. Also known as the Great Bodhidarma, the work is a depiction of Bodhidharma, known in Japan as Daruma, a revered Buddhist monk of the 5th or 6th century. The original artwork was destroyed by the bombing of Nagoya in May 1945.

== Background ==
The Great Daruma was not Hokusai's first monumental portrait. In 1804, during a festival at the Gokoku-ji temple in Edo (modern Tokyo), he created a portrait of Daruma said to be 600 feet (180 m) long, using a broom and buckets full of ink.

== Conception ==
Hokusai made the Great Daruma in a courtyard beside the Hongan-ji Nagoya Betsuin Buddhist temple in Nagoya, Japan. The portrait depicted the head of the monk and his upper body swathed in flowing robes. It was drawn on a large expanse of paper, measuring 59 by 35 feet (18 m × 11 m), equivalent to approximately 120 standard tatami mats of 70 by 35 inches (178 cm × 89 cm) each. The eyes were 70 inches (180 cm) wide, the nose 105 inches (270 cm) long, and the mouth 82 inches (210 cm) across.

The event was advertised in advance to draw a large crowd. Hokusai and his pupils wore special attire. They spent the morning preparing the vats of ink and laying the extra thick paper on a bed of straw. Hokusai worked for hours adding bold lines of ink until the image was finally revealed when the paper was hoisted into the air using a large wooden beam attached to one end, like a gigantic hanging scroll, or the huge thongdrel thankas of Tibetan Buddhism (usually in silk appliqué).

== Reception ==
As a result of this dramatic feat, Hokusai became known in Nagoya as "Daruma-sen", the Daruma master. The triumph brought greater attention to Hokusai, enabling him to sell more prints to the public, including prints of the Great Daruma. He published a new volume of his Manga sketches in 1817. The event was recounted in a popular song and celebrated in a printed surimono and large reproduction (pictured). The feat was described in Kōriki Enkōan's Detailed Illustrations of Hokusai’s Large Scale Sketches the same year. A later illustrated account features in Iijima Hanjūrō's 1893 Biography of Katsushika Hokusai.

In 2017, the bicentennial anniversary of the event, the painting was recreated with the cooperation of Aichi University of the Arts and Nagoya City Museum.

== Destruction ==
The original artwork survived in Nagoya until May 1945, when it was destroyed along with the wooden temple building in the bombing of Nagoya in World War II. Contemporaneous promotional handbills survive, with some held at the Nagoya City Museum.

== Gallery ==
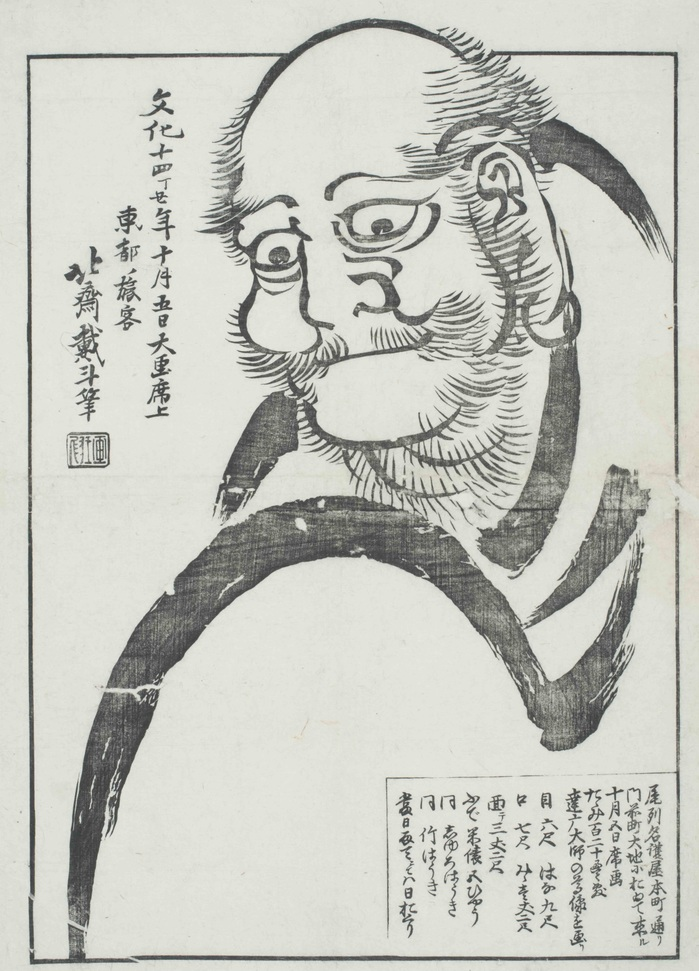
"Handbill for Hokusai’s Colossal Image Sketch" (北斎大画即書引札), 1817

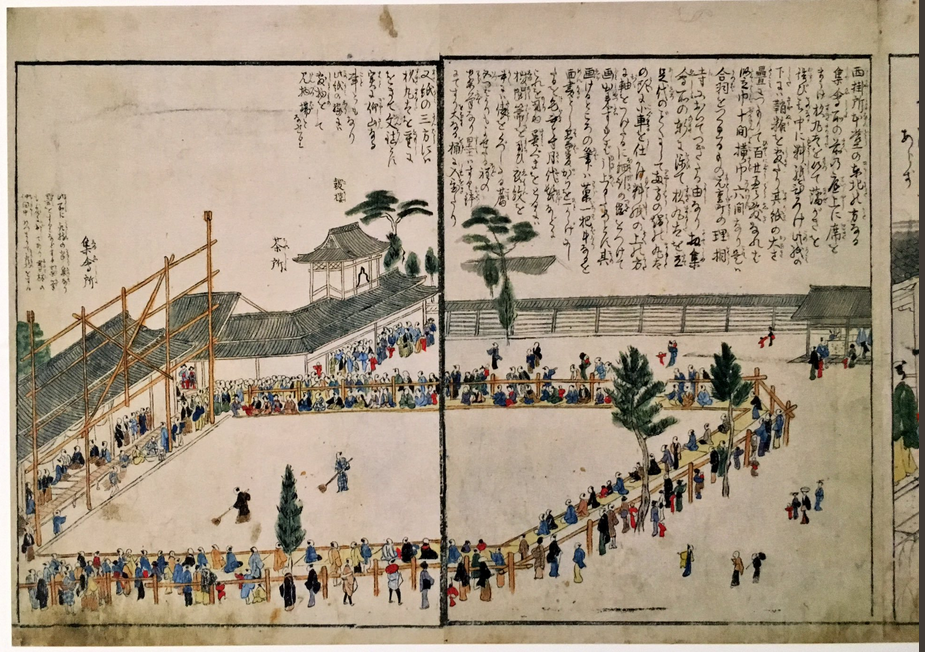
From Kōriki Enkōan's Detailed Illustrations of Hokusai’s Large Scale Sketches (北斎大画即書細図), 1817

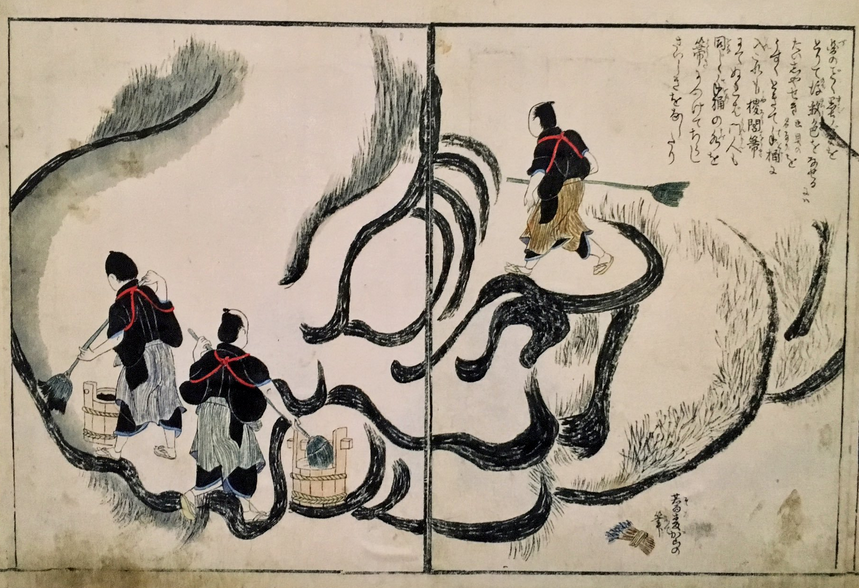
From Kōriki Enkōan's Detailed Illustrations of Hokusai’s Large Scale Sketches, 1817

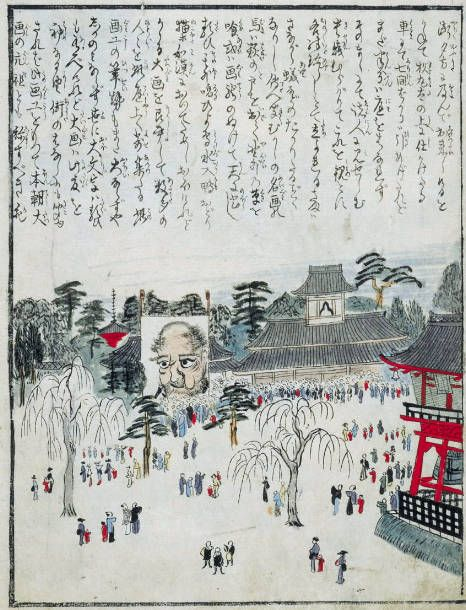
Raising the image. From Kōriki Enkōan's Detailed Illustrations of Hokusai’s Large Scale Sketches, 1817
