= Suehiro =

Suehiro (末広) is a Japanese term and can refer to:

== Surname ==
- Amy Suehiro (1906–1968), Japanese-American entomologist
- Hidetaka Suehiro (末広 秀孝, born 1973), Japanese video game designer

== Given name ==
A masculine name, notable people with the name include:

- Suehiro Ishikawa (石川 末廣, born 1979), Japanese long-distance runner
- Suehiro Maruo (丸尾 末広, born 1956), Japanese manga artist
- Suehiro Tanemura (種村 季弘, 1933–2004), Japanese translator, critic and essayist

== Places ==
- Suehiro Canal, canal in the city of Kawasaki, Kanagawa Prefecture
- Suehiro-chō, district of Miyako (Iwate)
- Suehiro-chō, Nagoya, district of Nagoya
  - Suehiro-za (Nagoya), a kabuki theatre
- Suehiro (Yūbari), station on the Yūbari railroad line
- Suehiro Station, a railway station in Akita Prefecture, Japan

== See also ==
- Suehiro Shōkai, Japanese company
- Suehiro-tei, Japanese Yose theatre
