= Hongan-ji Nagoya Betsuin =

Buddhist temple in Nagoya, Japan

Hongan-ji Nagoya Betsuin 本願寺派名古屋別院
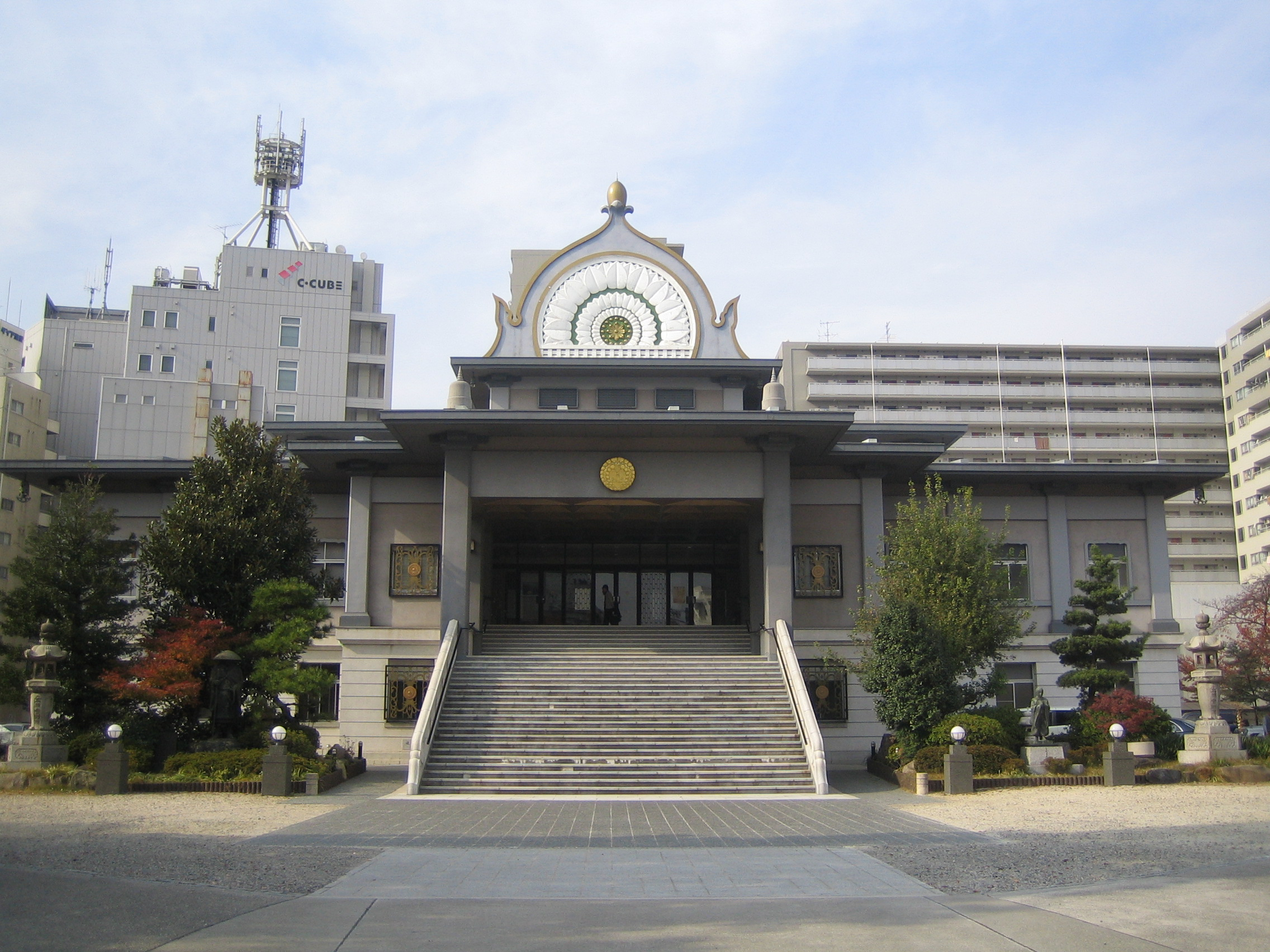
- Main hall

- Location within Japan

Religion
- Affiliation: Jōdo Shinshū Honganji-ha
- Status: Head temple

Location
- Location: 754 Monzenchō, Naka-ku, Nagoya, Aichi Prefecture
- Country: Japan
- Coordinates: 35°9′25.6″N 136°53′58.4″E

Architecture
- Founder: Renjun
- Completed: 1492-1500

Website
- http://www.tokai-hongwanji.net/index.html Hongwanji-Nagoya-betsuin

The Hongan-ji Nagoya Betsuin (本願寺派名古屋別院) is a Jōdo Shinshū Buddhist temple located in Naka ward, Nagoya in central Japan.

The temple is a short distance south of Ōsu Kannon Station. It is also known a Nishi Betsuin (西別院; "Western branch temple"), being associated with Nishi Hongan-ji (西本願寺) in Kyoto. It is contrasted with the Ōtani-ha temple of the same name, popularly known as Higashi Betsuin (東別院; "Eastern branch temple").

== History ==
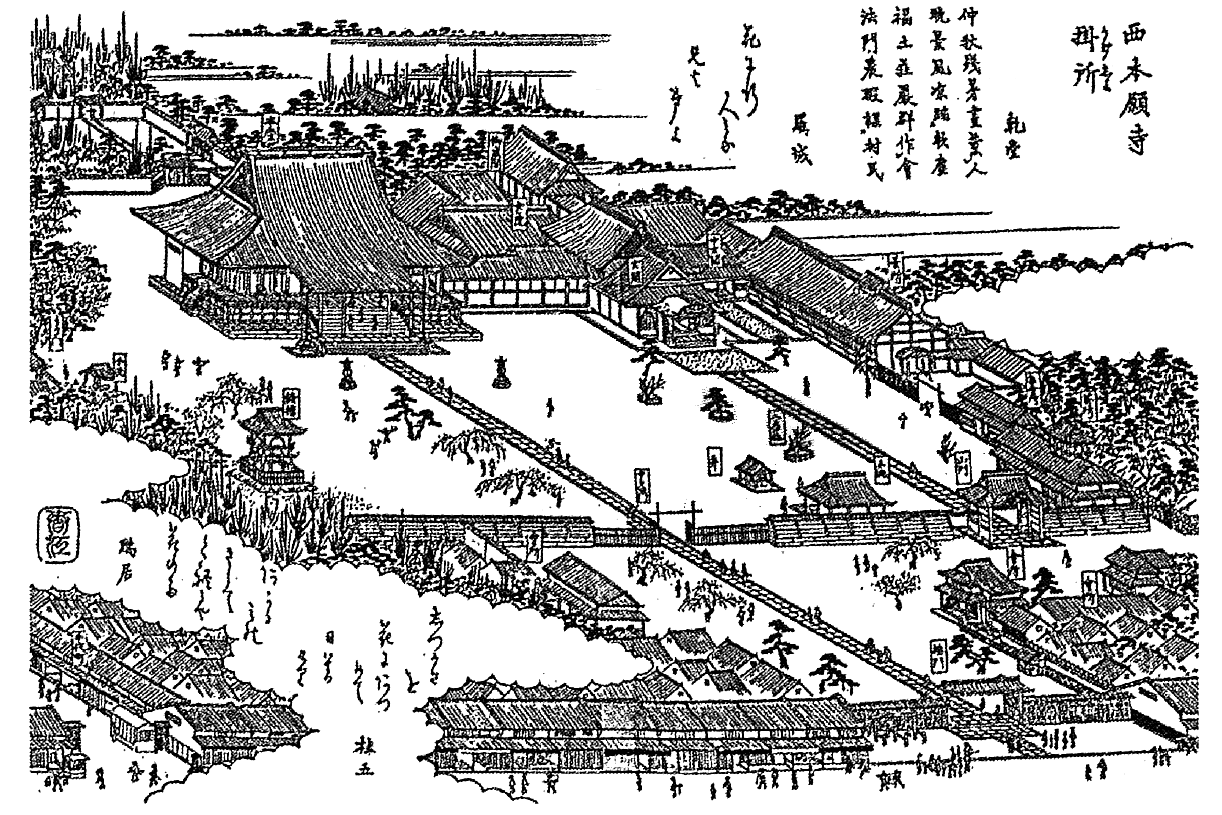
Illustration with an aerial view of the temple in the 19th century, from the Owari Meishō Zue

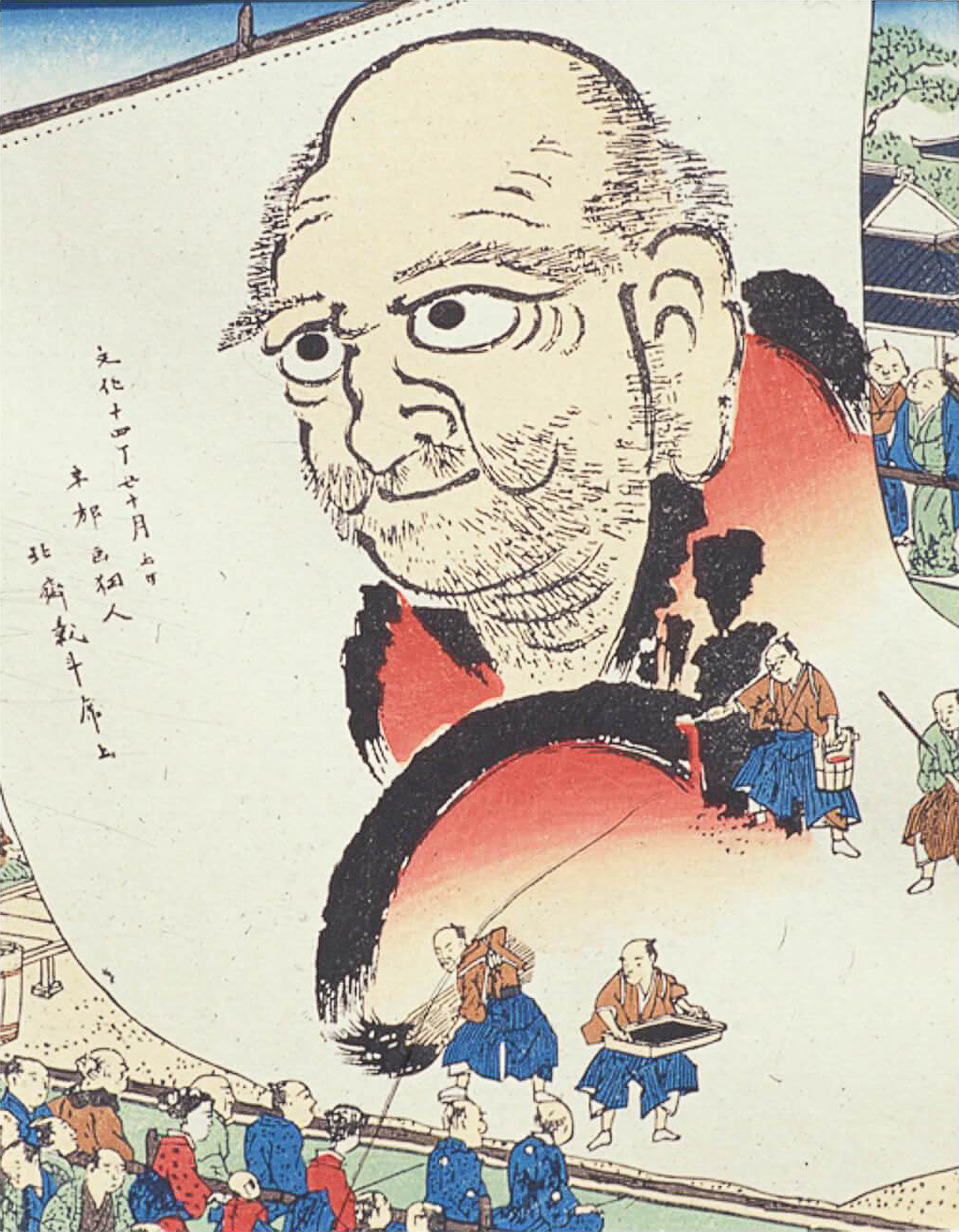
Hokusai painting the Great Daruma in 1817

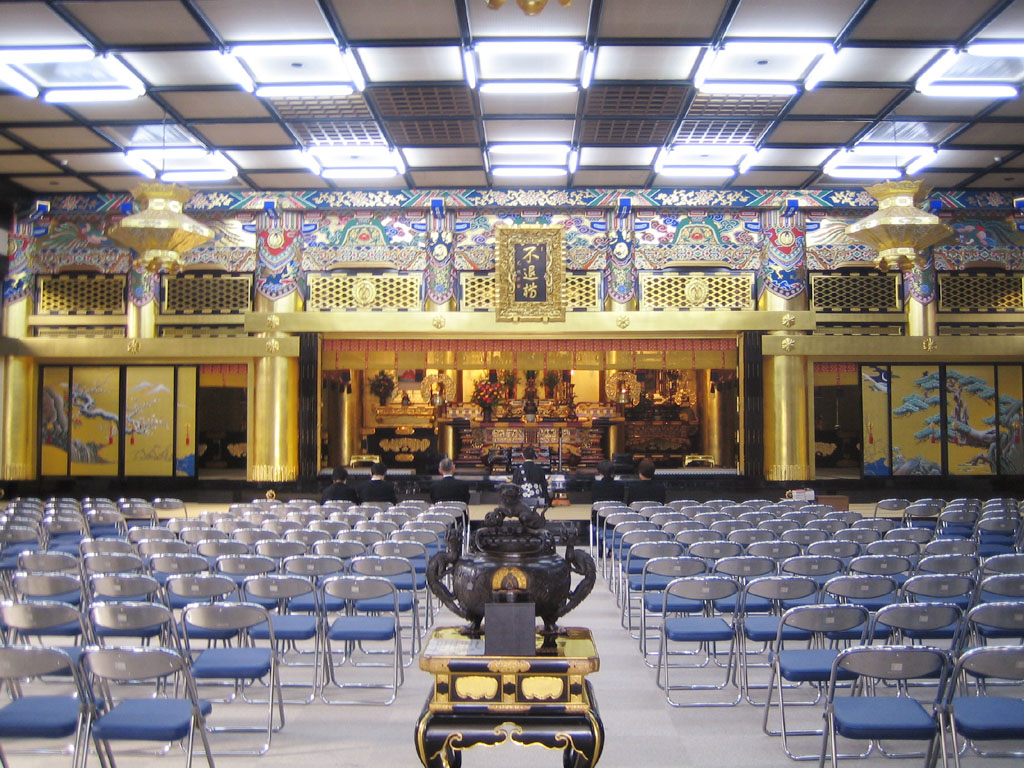
View into the main hall

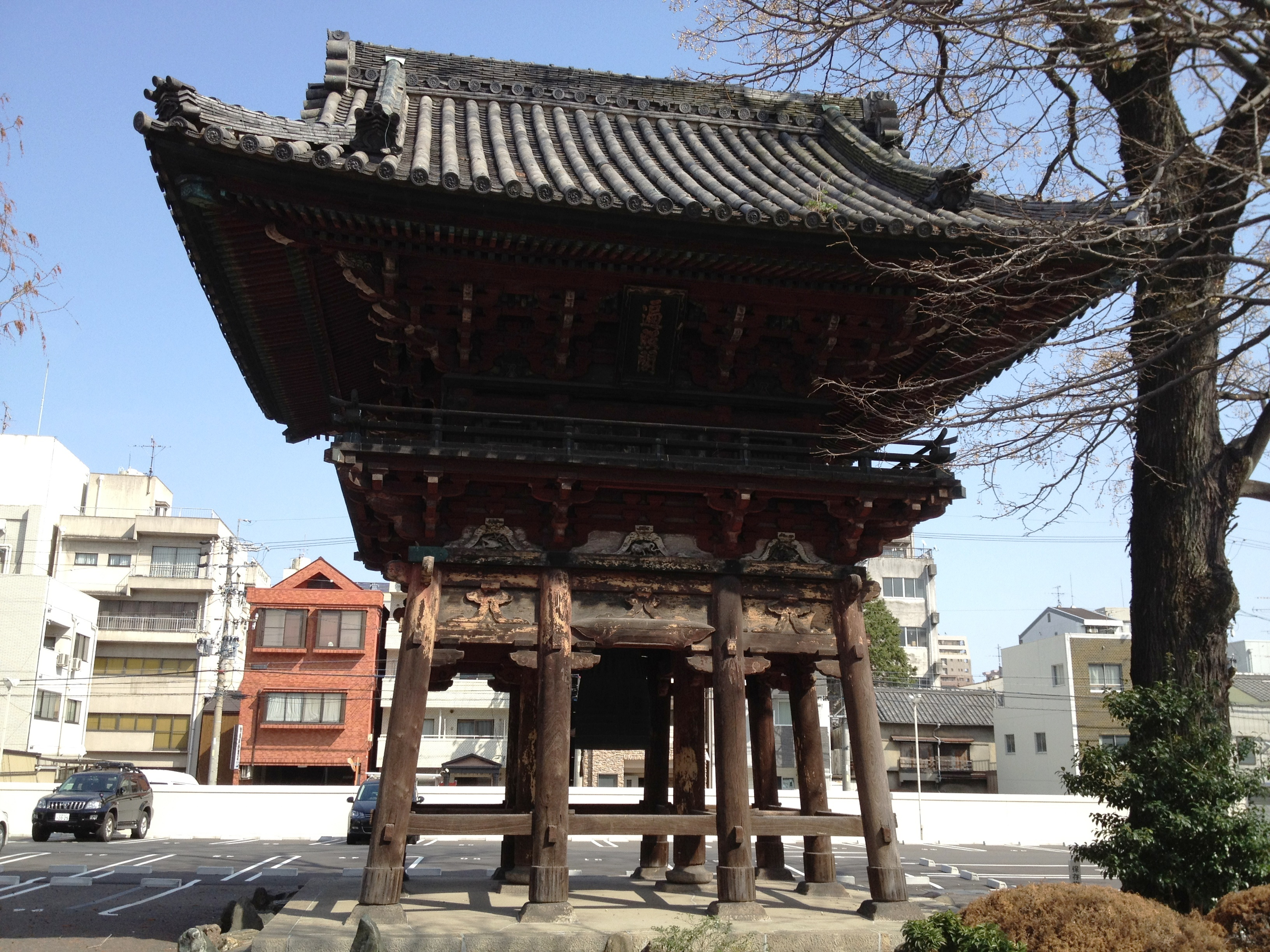
Wooden shōrō (belltower) from the Edo period

Hongan-ji Nagoya Betsuin dates back to about 1500 CE when chief abbot Rennyo's 13th child, Renjun, built Ganshō-ji (願証寺) in the Japanese cedar groves of Ise province. The temple later fell on hard times and was renovated. In the early Edo period it was moved to the current location at the time of the construction of Nagoya Castle.

It was patronized by Baishō-in, concubine of Tokugawa Tsunanari (1652–1699), lord of the Owari Domain.

On 5 October 1817, Hokusai visited the temple and, with the assistance of his disciples, painted the Great Daruma on a sheet of paper measuring 18×10.8 metres, impressing many onlookers. For this feat, he received the name "Darusen" (a shortened form of Daruma Sensei). Although the original was destroyed in 1945, promotional handbills from that time survived and are preserved at the Nagoya City Museum. According to several studies, a reproduction of the large painting was done at a large public event on 23 November 2017 to commemorate the 200-year anniversary of the painting, using the same size, techniques and material as the original. A prayer ceremony was done afterwards to bless the painting.

In 1874, close to the temple, a medical training centre, the predecessor of Nagoya University's School of Medicine, was set up for medical research, practice and education. Later the centre was moved to Tennozaki on the banks of the Hori River.

The wooden building and artwork were largely destroyed during the bombing of Nagoya in World War II in May 1945. It was rebuilt in a Mauryan Dynasty ancient Indian style.

The wooden bell tower (shōrō) survived the war undamaged, and is said to be also donated by Baishō-in in Kyōhō 14 (1729). The bell is suspended on the lower level, different from the typical bell tower style. The carved sculptures are also of high quality. It was named a City-designated Cultural Property in 2017.

== Features ==
On the grounds there is a bronze statue commemorating Shinran, the founder of Jōdo Shinshū.

The Hongan-ji Betsuin houses the ashes of deceased persons, which are kept in their urns in metal lockers on the ground floor. By request from relatives, monks will perform prayer services for a fee.

== See also ==
- Tsukiji Hongan-ji in Tokyo, which has an architectural resemblance
