= Fuji Sengen Shrine =

Fuji Sengen Shrine may refer to:

- Fuji Sengen Shrine (Naka-ku, Nagoya)
- Fuji Sengen Shrine (Nishi-ku, Nagoya)
