= Misono-za =

Theater in Nagoya, Japan

Coordinates: 35°10′02.32″N 136°53′48.95″E

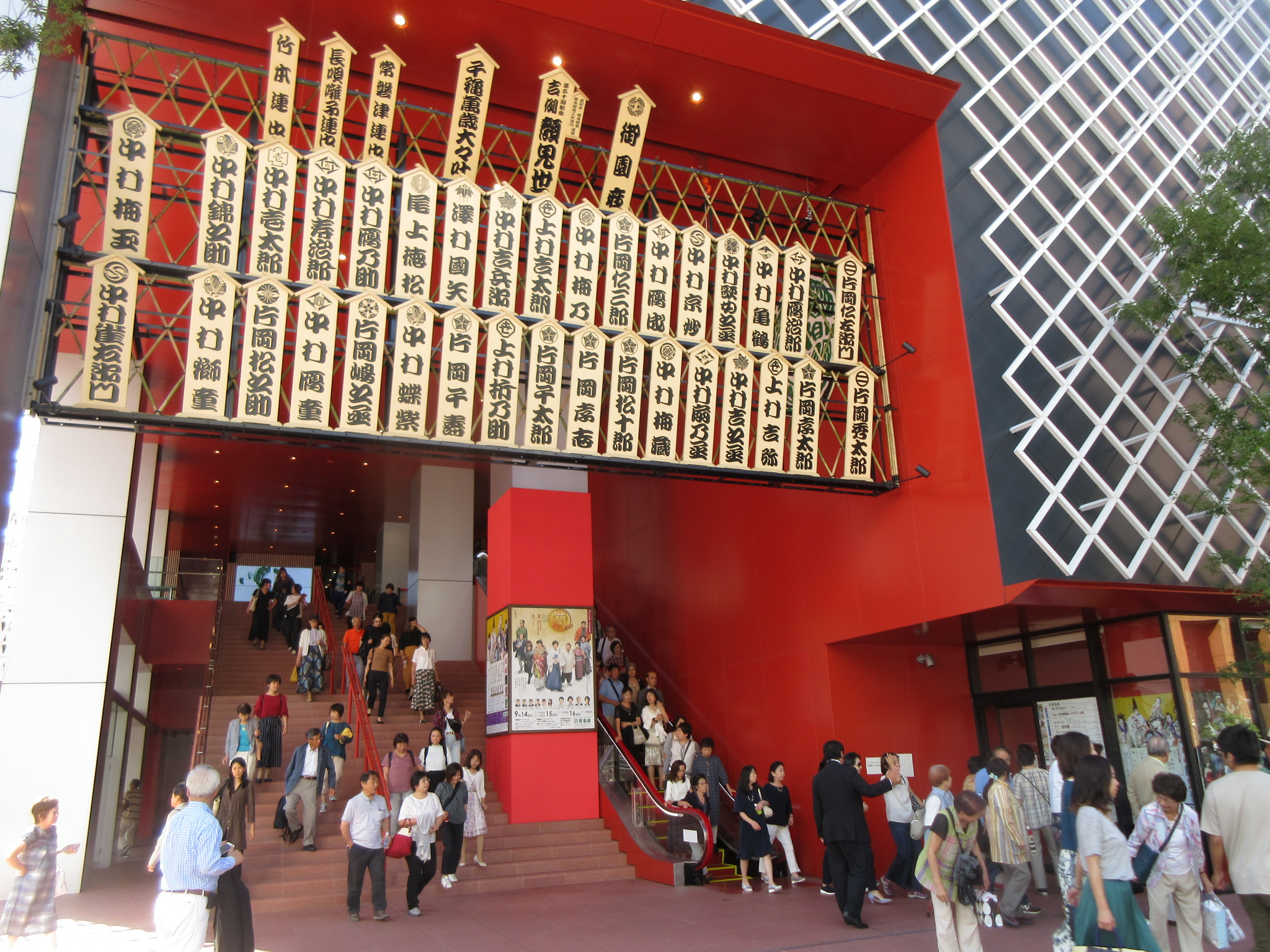
Main entrance to Misono-za in vermillion colour, surrounded by the namako wall pattern

The Misono-za (御園座) is a theatre in the city of Nagoya, central Japan. It was originally constructed in 1800s and presents kabuki and Western stage plays.

== History ==
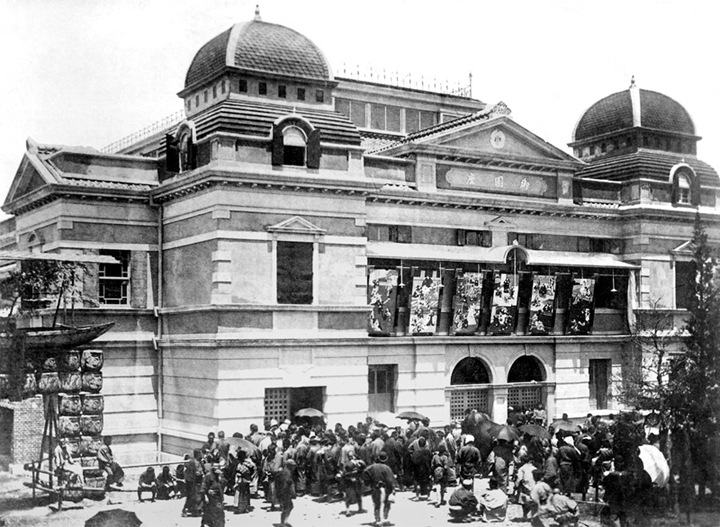
Misono-za theatre in 1897

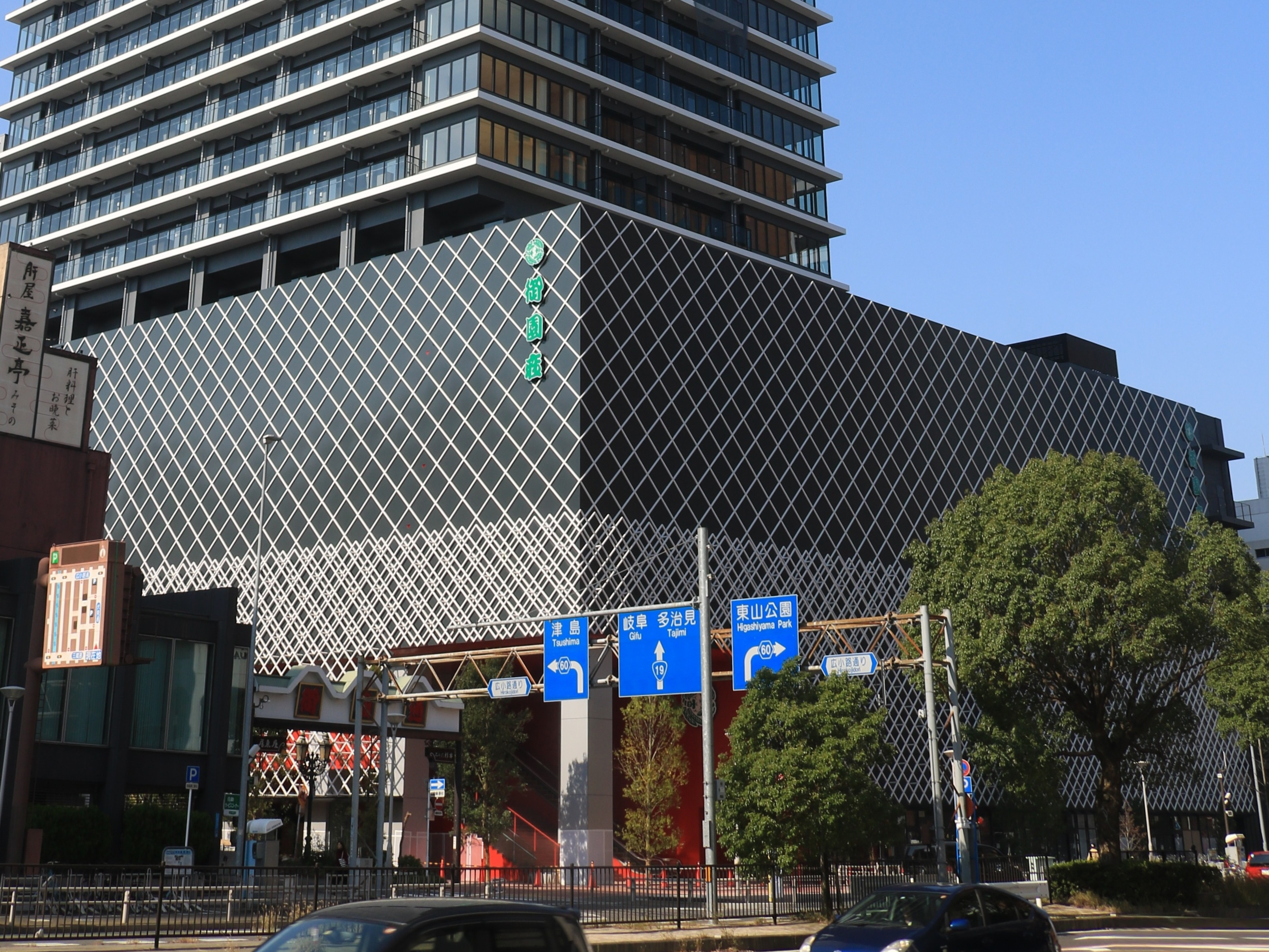
Misono-za theatre with the namako pattern on the walls (2017)

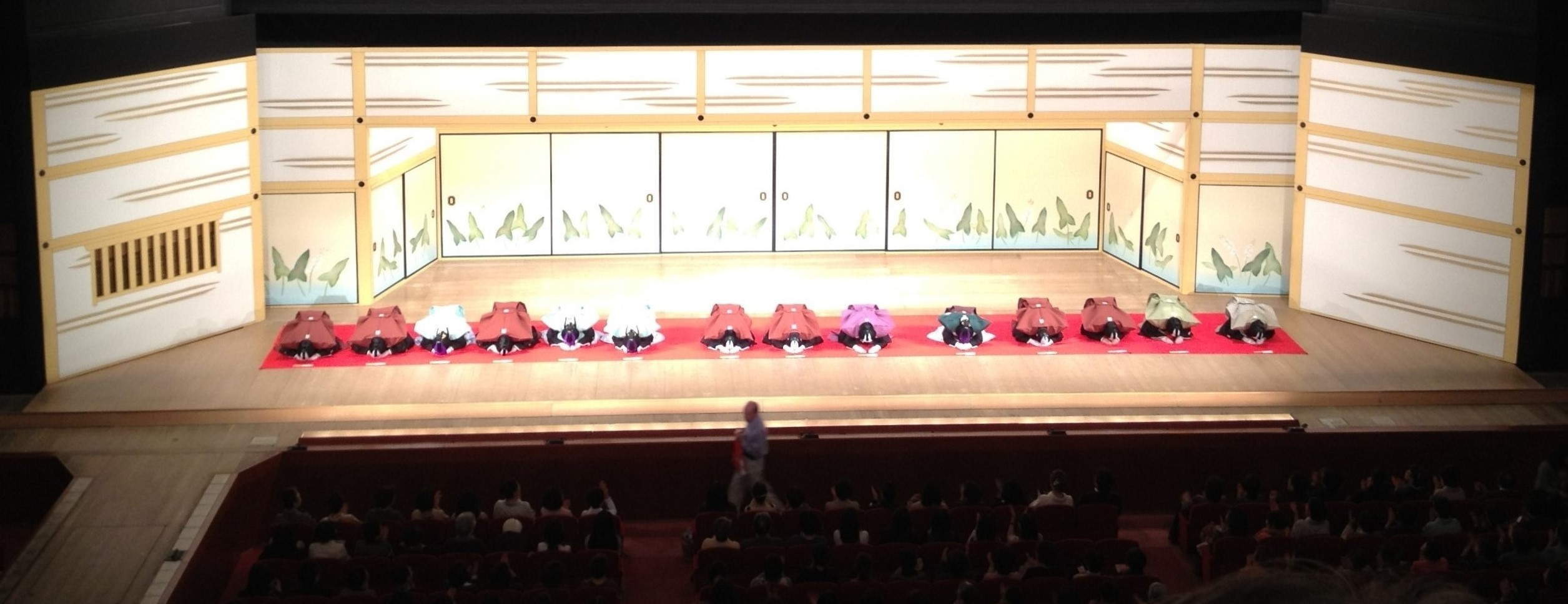
Shūmei name-taking ceremony (襲名) of Ichikawa En'ō II, Ichikawa Ennosuke IV and Ichikawa Chūsha IX (March 2013)

The tradition of kabuki in Nagoya goes back to the Edo period. With the opening of Japan to the West in the Meiji era, the Japanese wooden structure was replaced with a permanent building that was constructed out of brick and mortar in the Western Renaissance style in 1895. This structure was enlarged by the 1920s with a pillared porch added to the front. The old theatre was destroyed during the bombing of Nagoya in World War II.

The new structure was constructed in the 1970s. A number of curtains, called doncho, were designed for the theatre. The artist Kataoka Tamako designed one of the curtains called "Flowers at Mount Fuji" (富士に献花), which was sponsored by Matsuzakaya. Downstairs there are a number of restaurants open for customers during the break.

The last performance was given in March 2013 following the shūmei name-taking ceremony (襲名) of Ichikawa En'ō II, Ichikawa Ennosuke IV and Ichikawa Chūsha IX. The building was rebuilt and opened again in 2018. Performances were held at the Chunichi Theatre during the interim.

The new building is decorated on the outside with white metal stripes that evoke the traditional namako wall pattern, which was the hallmark of the entrance of the previous Misono-za building. The design comes from the office of the renowned architect Kuma Kengo.

== See also ==
- Suehiro-za (Nagoya) (末広座), another theatre in Nagoya
- Kabuki-za
- Minami-za
