= Suehiro-za (Nagoya) =

Kabuki theater in Japan

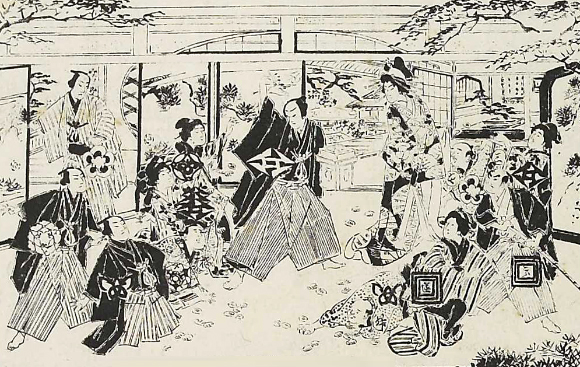
Illustration of a kabuki scene in a tsuji banzuke flyer of the Suehiro-za, June 1921

The Suehiro-za (末広座) was a kabuki theatre in Nagoya, central Japan. It was located in Suehiro-chō, Naka Ward.

== History ==
In Nagoya of the Meiji era at that time a number of theatres existed, such as the Chitose-za (千歳座) in Minamikuwana-machi (南桑名町), Shinmori-za (新守座) in Motoshige-chō (本重町), Onu-za (音羽座) in Minamifushimi-chō (南伏見町), Hoso-za (宝生座) in Ōsu, and Misono-za. The theatre was founded under a different name originally in January 1883.

Among the many noted actors were Nakamura Denkurō VI (1859-1923), who was born in Suehiro-chō and became of a member of the children actors troupe at the Suehiro-za. Ichikawa Chūsha VII (1860-1936) and Ichikawa Danzō VII (1836-1911) appeared together in May 1909, as well as Nakamura Tokizō III (1895-1959) appeared here in May 1917.

The building was bought by Shochiku, a cinema chain which has its roots in kabuki production, and converted into a movie theatre in 1927. Under its new name Shochiku-za (松竹座) it became one of the leading cinemas in town and was also used for revue shows. It was destroyed in the bombing of Nagoya during World War II.
