= Funairi-chō, Nagoya =

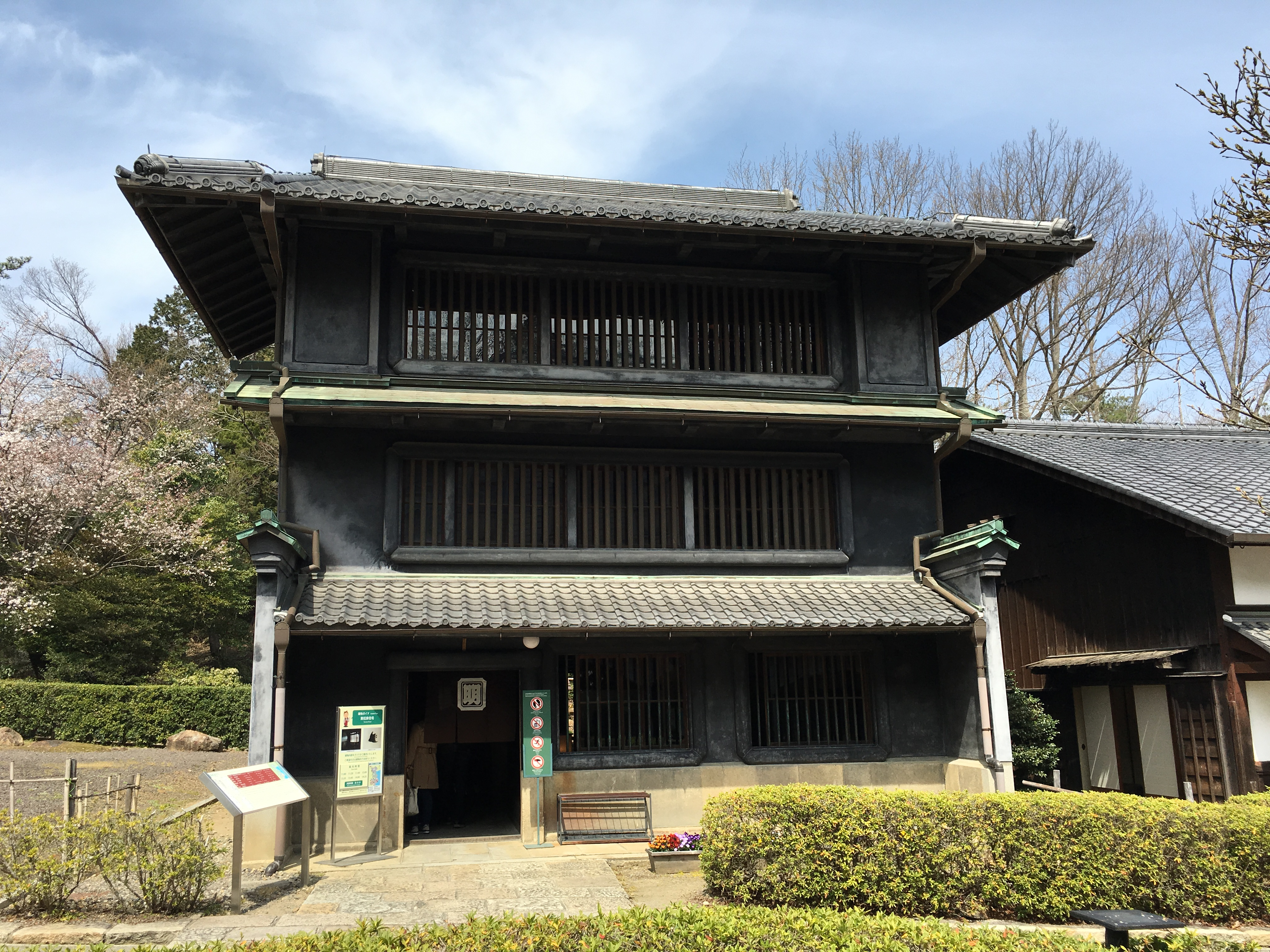
The Tōmatsu House from Funairi-chō, today in the museum Meiji-mura

Funairi-chō (船入町) is a historic neighbourhood located in the Nakamura ward of Nagoya, central Japan.

It was one of the merchant areas, located close to the Hori Canal and south of Nagoya Castle. The translation means a "ship entering town". It was an area of trade and commerce. Houses were in the machiya style, with the commercial area downstairs, and the family living in the back and upstairs. The area was heavily damaged during the bombing of Nagoya during the Pacific War, with a large number of merchant houses destroyed and persons perished.

One of the traditional merchant machiya houses that survived from there is the Tōmatsu House (東松家住宅, Tōmatsu-ka jūtaku), which was constructed in 1901 and was located next to Tenmahashi bridge (伝馬橋) and relocated to the Meiji-mura museum in the 1960s. It has been designated by the government as an Important Cultural Property.

Bordering north of Funairi-chō along the canal is the Shikemichi, a registered historical street which also features machiya houses.

== See also ==
- Suehiro-chō, Nagoya
