= Wakamiya Hachiman Shrine =

Shrine in Naka Ward, Nagoya, Japan

Coordinates: 35°09′48″N 136°54′12″E

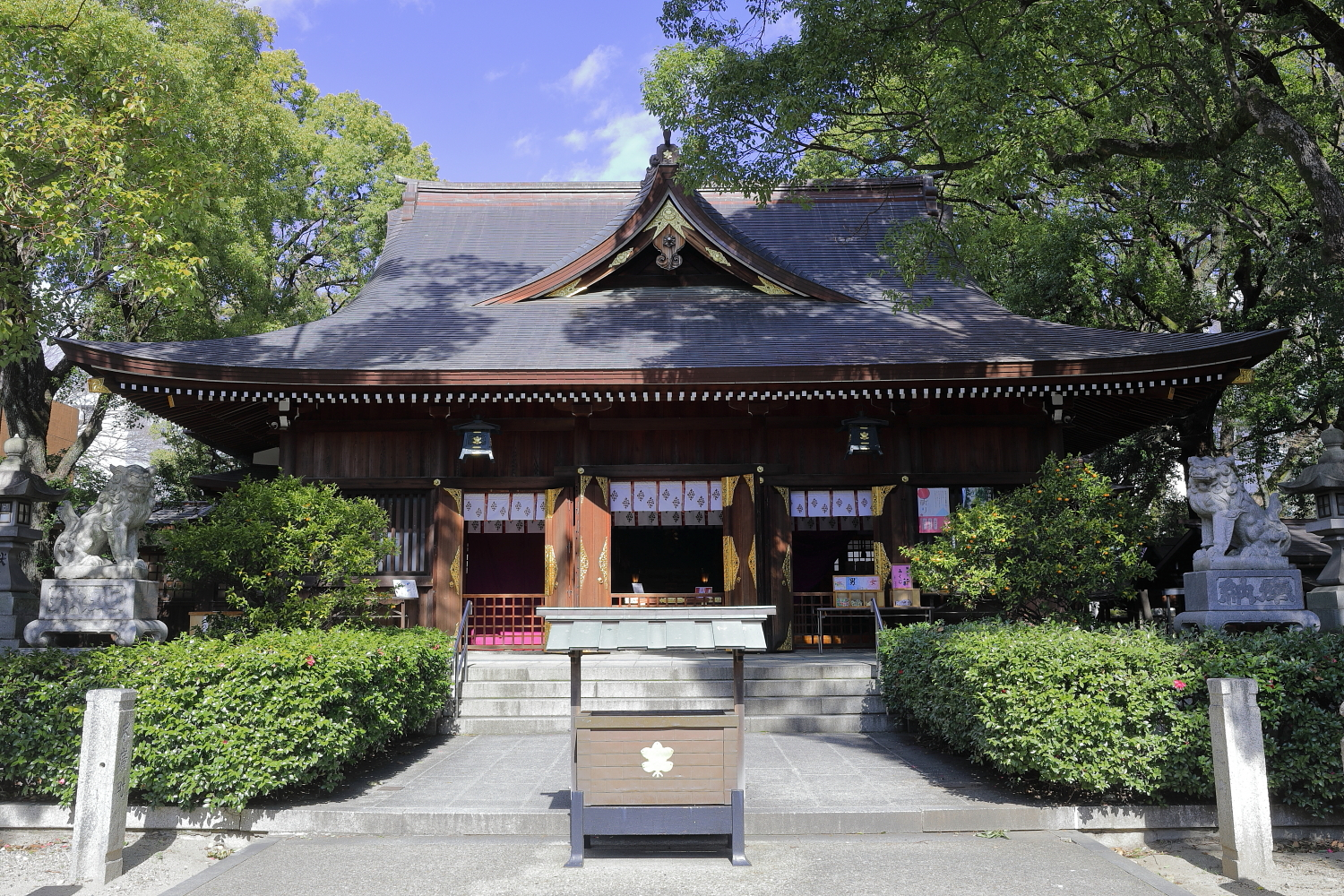
The haiden of the Wakamiya Hachiman Shrine

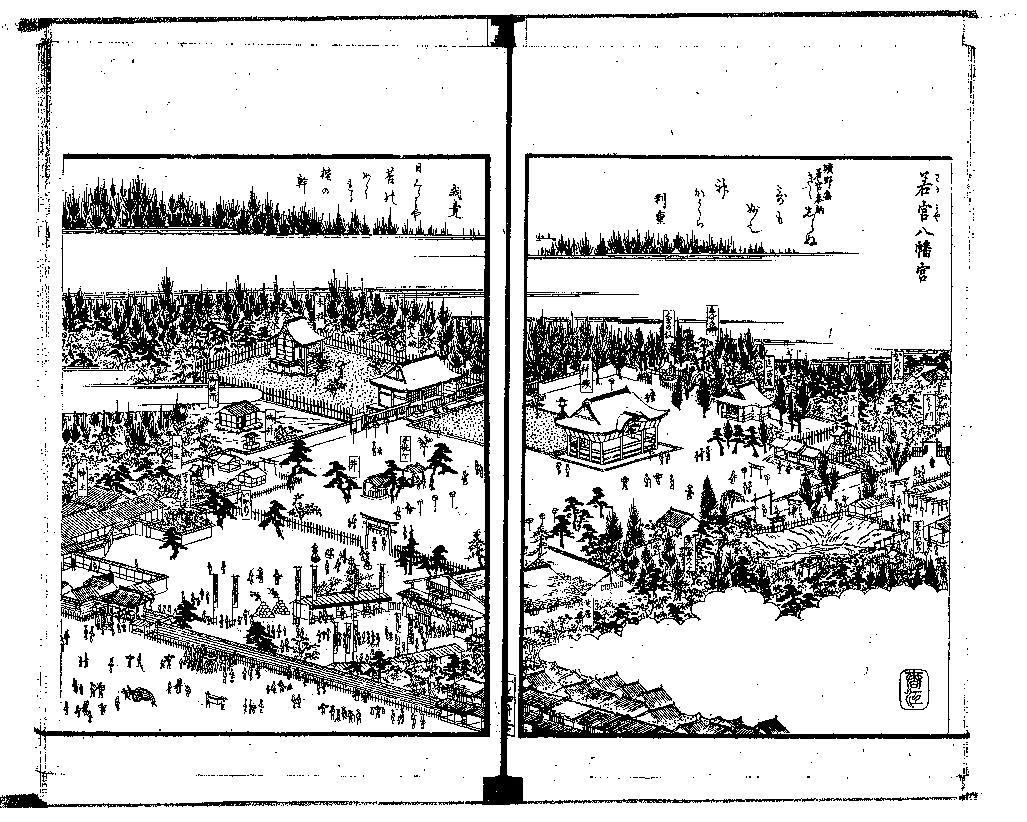
Historic print with an aerial view of the shrine, from the Owari meisho zue (1880)

The Wakamiya Hachiman Shrine (若宮八幡社 Wakamiya Hachimansha) in Suehiro-chō, Sakae 3-chōme in the Naka ward of Nagoya is a historic Shinto shrine.

The shrine's record tells that it dates back to the reign of Emperor Monmu (697-707) in Taihō era (701-704) and was restored during the Engi era (901-23).

Shōgun Tokugawa leyasu (1542-1616) relocated the shrine to the present site in 1610.

It was the main shrine of the Owari Tokugawa family.

The shrine was destroyed in the bombing of Nagoya in World War II, but rebuilt in 1957.

The shrine's festival is carried out on May 15 and 16 every year. Its festival float "Fukurokuju-sha" (Fukurokuju is one of seven gods of good luck) is a registered cultural property of the city.
