= Suehiro-chō, Nagoya =

Neighborhood in Nagoya, Japan

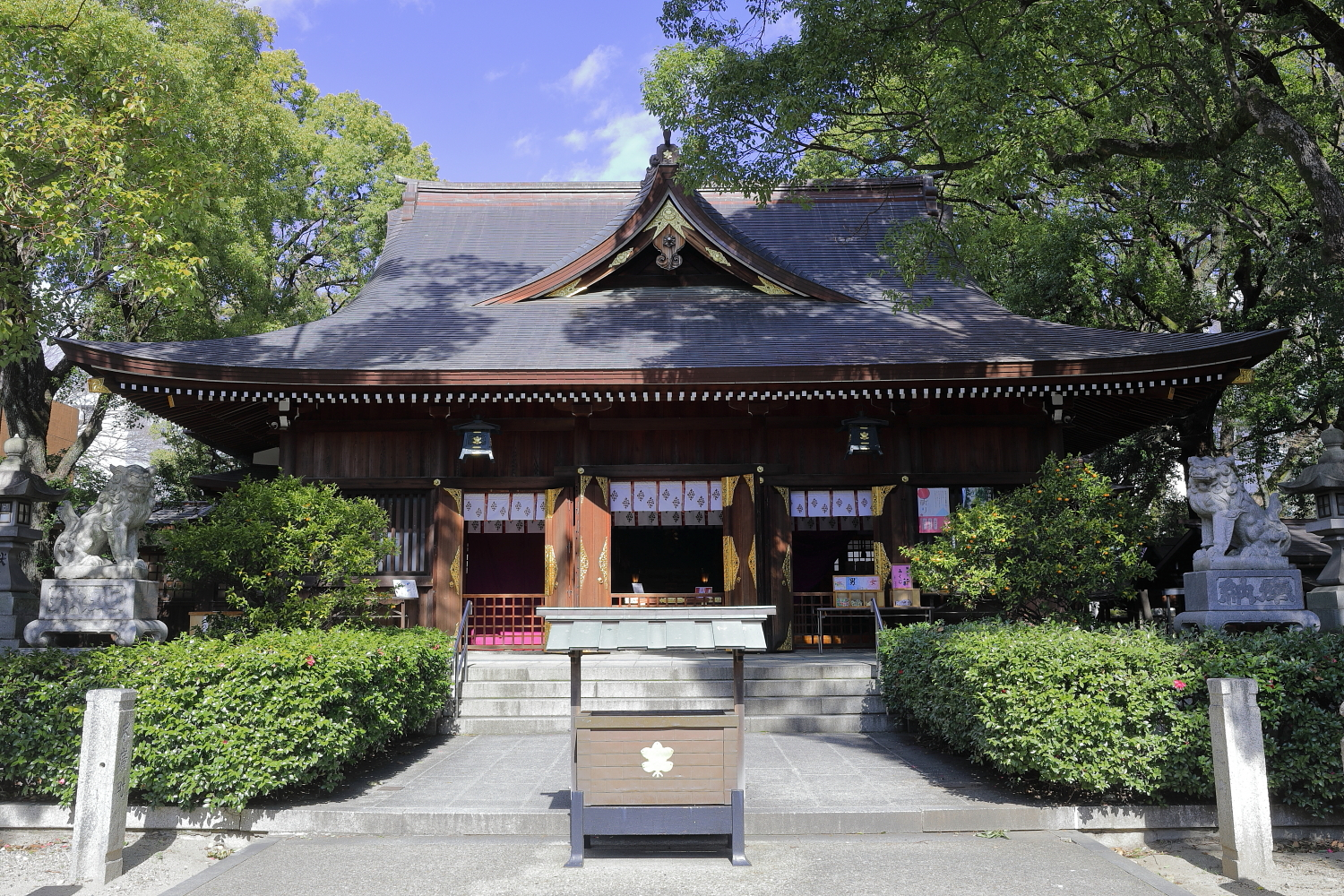
The Wakamiya Hachiman Shrine in Suehiro-chō

Suehiro-chō (末広町) is a historic neighbourhood located in the Naka ward of Nagoya, central Japan. It is where the present Sakae 2-chome, Sakae 3-chome, Ōsu 2-chome, and Osu 3-chome are located. It received its name in Hōei 5.

The Suehiro-za (末広座) was a kabuki theatre located there. It was one of the leading theatres in town.

The Wakamiya Hachiman Shrine is also located there. A large festival is held there every May.

== See also ==
- Funairi-chō, Nagoya
