= Shikemichi =

Coordinates: 35°10′30″N 136°53′33″E

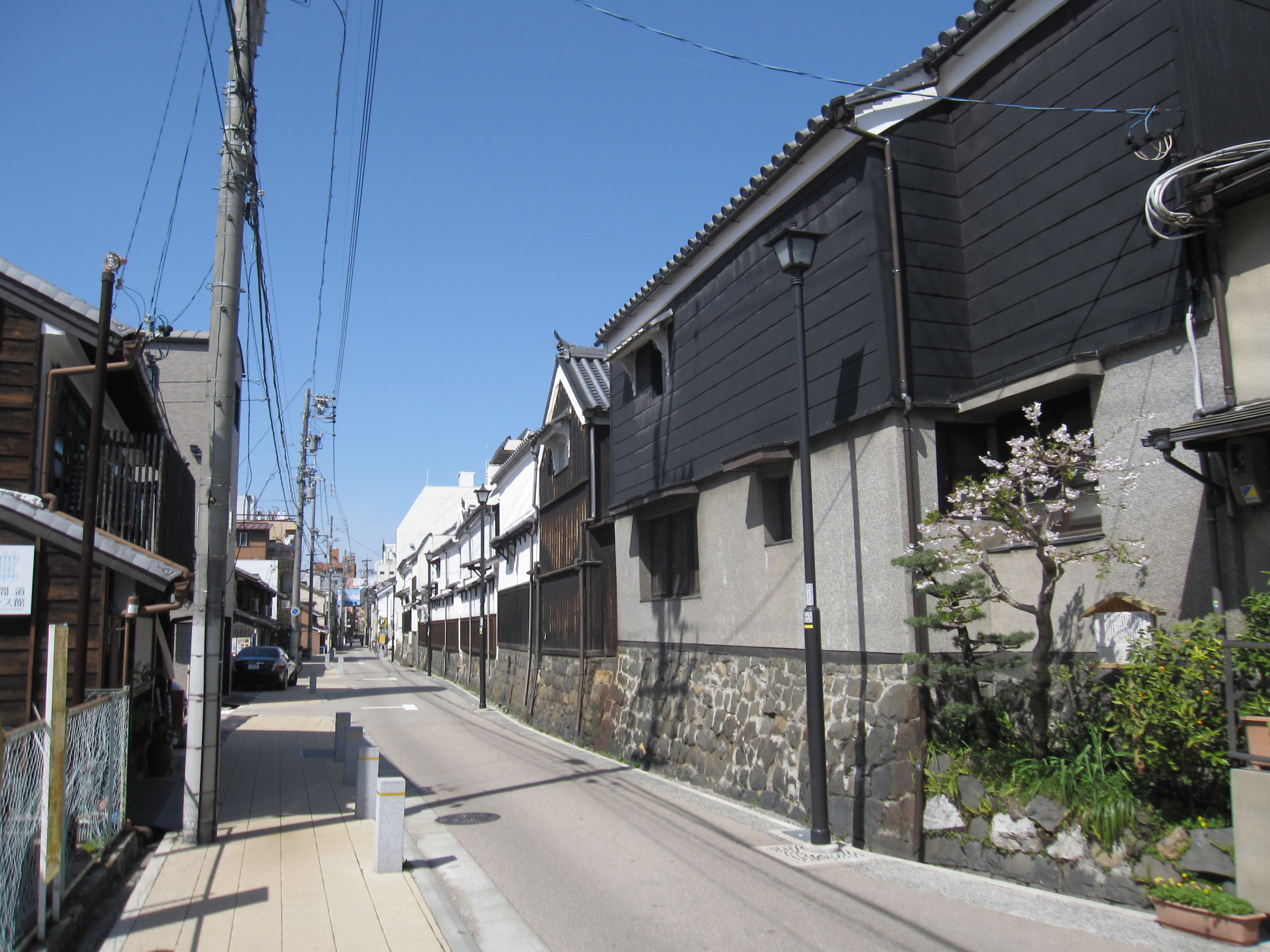
Shikemichi in central Nagoya (2012)

Shike-michi (四間道) is a small historical street in Nishi-ku, Nagoya in central Japan.

== History ==
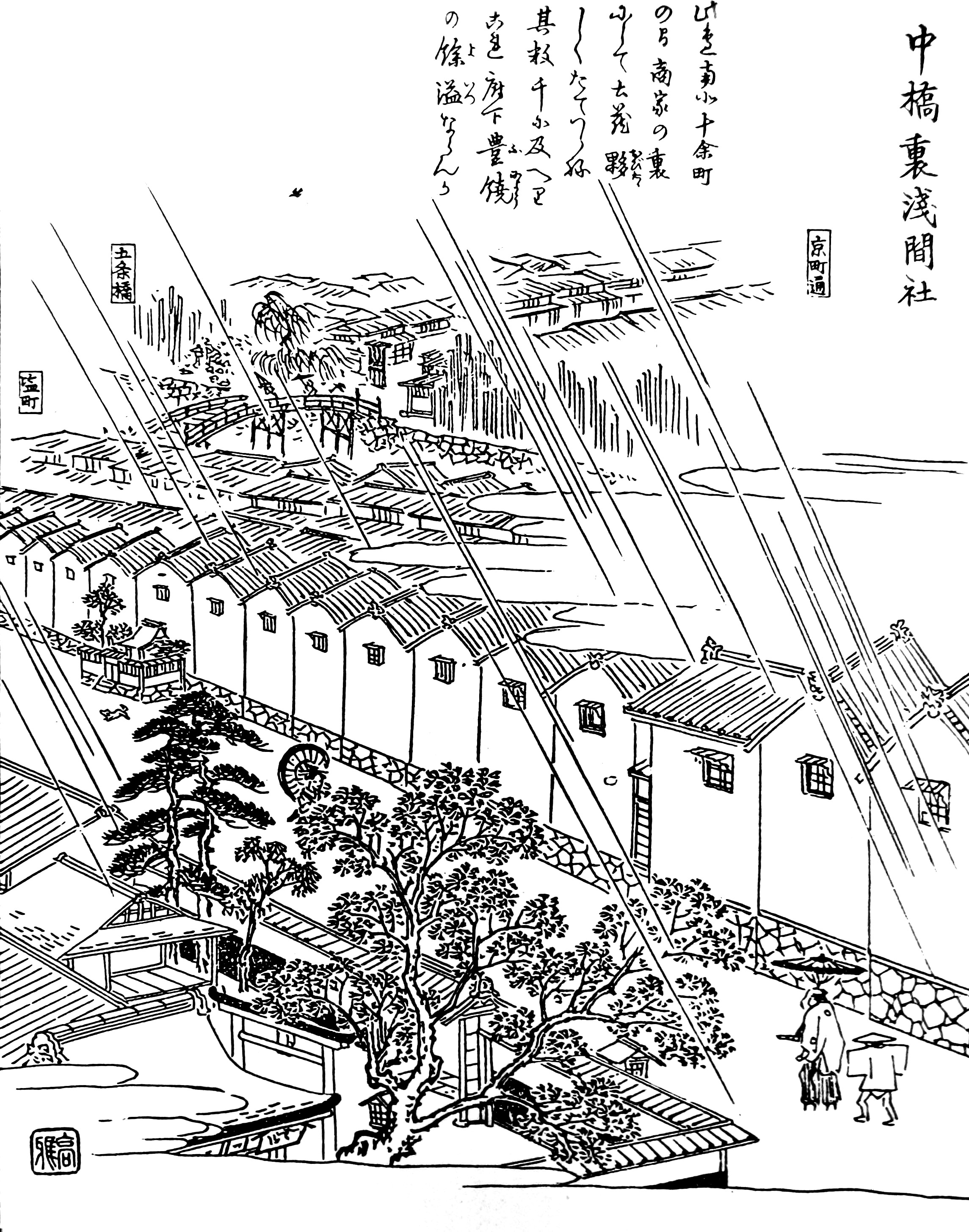
Woodblock print of the Shikemichi, depicting the Sengen shrine at the lower part, and the Gojō bridge over the Hori river in the upper part. (Depiction from the Owari meisho zue, 19th century)

The district was founded for merchants at the time when Nagoya Castle was constructed as the seat of the Owari lords in 1610 CE (Keichō 15), following the move from the town of Kiyosu. The move from Kiyosu to Nagoya was called "Kiyosu goshi". The merchants who lived and worked here in their machiya houses traded in rice, miso, sake, salt, charcoal and wood. The Hori River was used as a transportation canal and commerce began to flourish.

A large fire in 1700, called Genroku-no-Taika, destroyed a large number of merchant houses and 15 temples and shrines in Nagoya. As a result, Tokugawa Yoshimichi, the 4th lord of Owari, decided to widen the back street that runs parallel to the Hori Canal. The measurements are four ken (shike), which is around 7 metres. The warehouses were constructed with plaster walls on the east side as a protection against future fires. It took around 40 years to complete the whole area. Most houses that are standing date to 1740.

The city designated the townscape as a historic conservation district on June 10, 1986.

Access by public transport is Marunouchi Station on the Tsurumai Line or Kokusai Center Station on the Sakuradori Line.

Bordering directly south of the street is the Funairi-chō neighbourhood.

== Yanegami ==
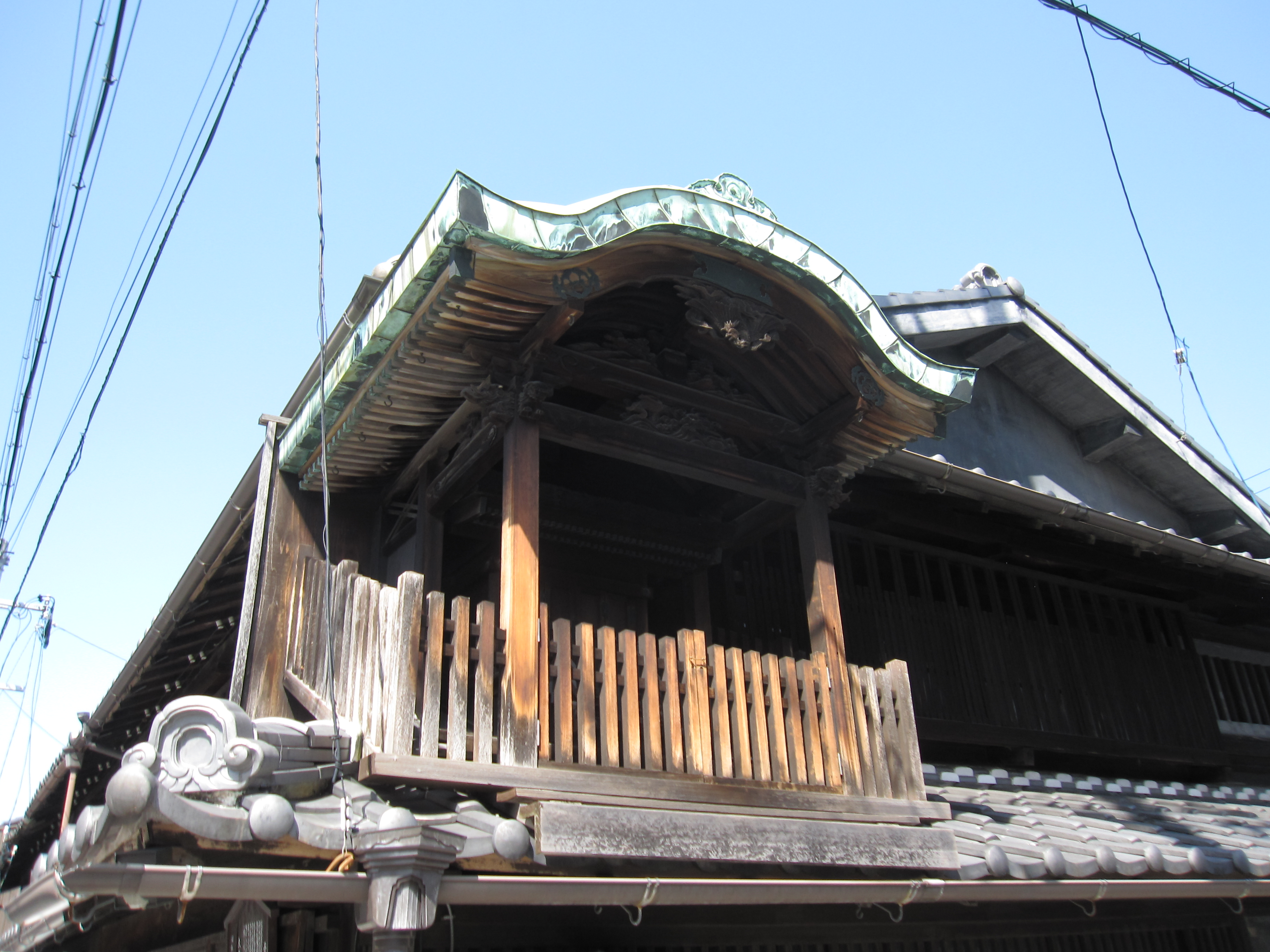
Yanegamisama (屋根神さま) rooftop shrine on one of the houses

An interesting feature on a warehouse is the rooftop shrine, called Yanegami (屋根神). This rooftop deity honours Tsushima, Akiba and Atsuta Shrines. A small altar erected on the roof is a Nagoya custom. It is a means to ward off disease and disasters, and reflects the great devotion of ordinary people.

== Gojō Bridge ==
The Gojō bridge (五条橋) over the Hori River is located at the northern end of the street. The name is thought to date back to time of the migration of the seat of government from Kiyosu to Nagoya in 1610 CE. The original bridge was said to have spanned the Gojō River in front of the Kiyosu Castle.

The wooden bridge was replaced in 1938 with a concrete one. The inscription on the ornamental metal knobs are inscribed with "Gojō Bridge, Keichō 7, Year of the Tiger, June, Lucky Day."

== Fuji Sengen Shrine ==
Located at the southern end of the street is the Shinto Fuji Sengen Shrine.
