= Banshō-ji =

Buddhist temple in Nagoya, Japan

Coordinates: 35°09′33″N 136°54′17″E

- 萬松寺 ばんしょうじ
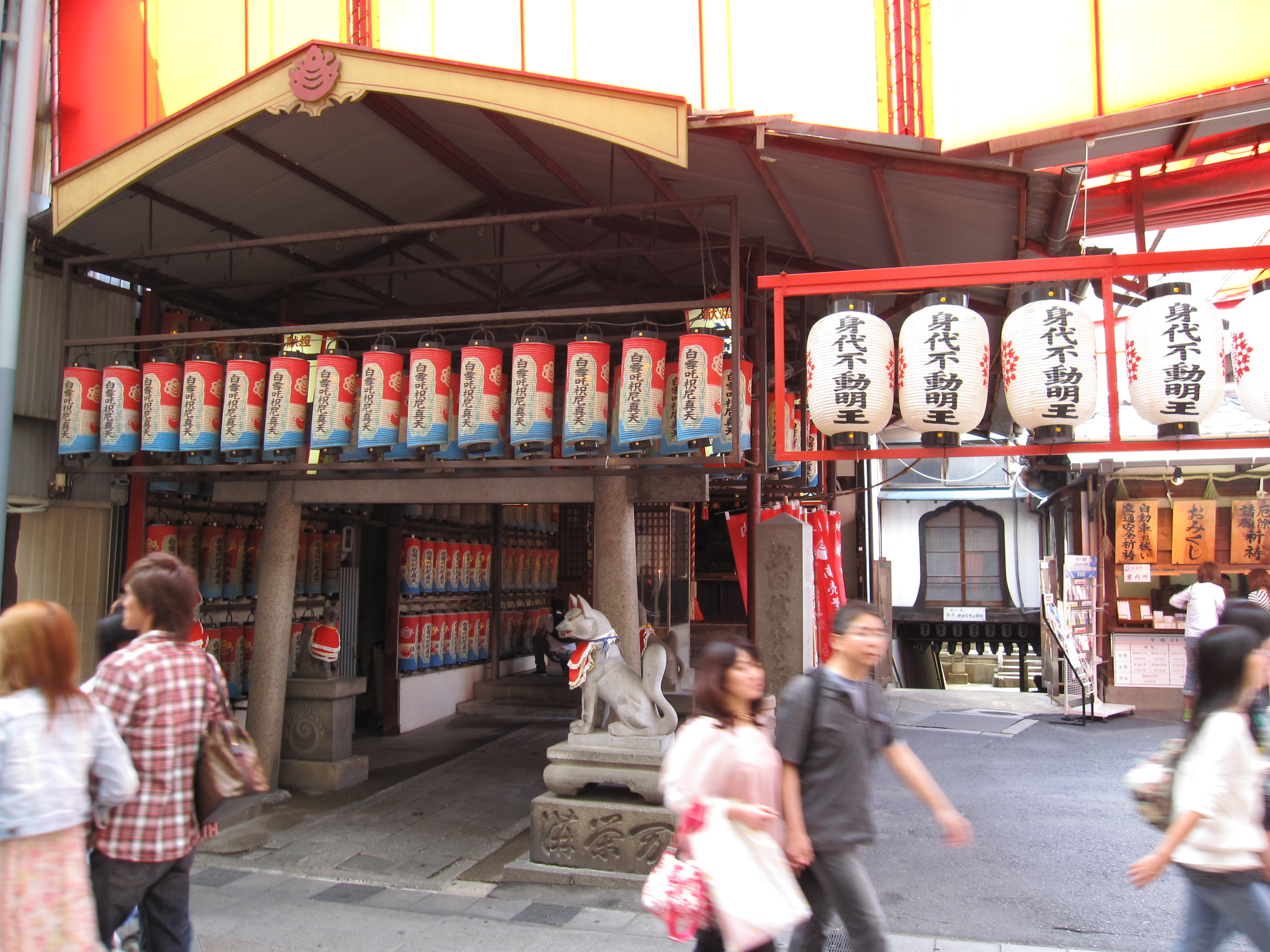

Religion
- Affiliation: Buddhism
- Deity: Ekādaśamukha

Location
- Location: 3 Chome-29-12 Ōsu, Naka-ku Ward, Nagoya, Aichi 460-0011, Japan

Architecture
- Founder: Oda Nobuhide
- Date established: 1540

Banshō-ji (万松寺) is a small temple located in Ōsu in central Nagoya, Japan.

Lord Oda Nobuhide (1510?-1552) built this Sōtō Buddhist temple in the then village of Nagoya in 1540, and invited the priest Daiun to open it. Katō Kiyomasa (1562–1611) stayed at the temple, which served as his quarters while he was engaged in the construction of Nagoya Castle. The temple was rebuilt in 1610 at its present site.

Directly located at the main street is the stone gate. Two kitsune (fox spirits) guard the entrance. Many paper lanterns give light.
