= Fuji Sengen Shrine (Naka-ku, Nagoya) =

Shinto shrine in Aichi Prefecture, Japan

Coordinates: 35°9′33″N 136°54′3″E

Fuji Sengen Shrine (富士浅間神社, Fuji Sengen Jinja)
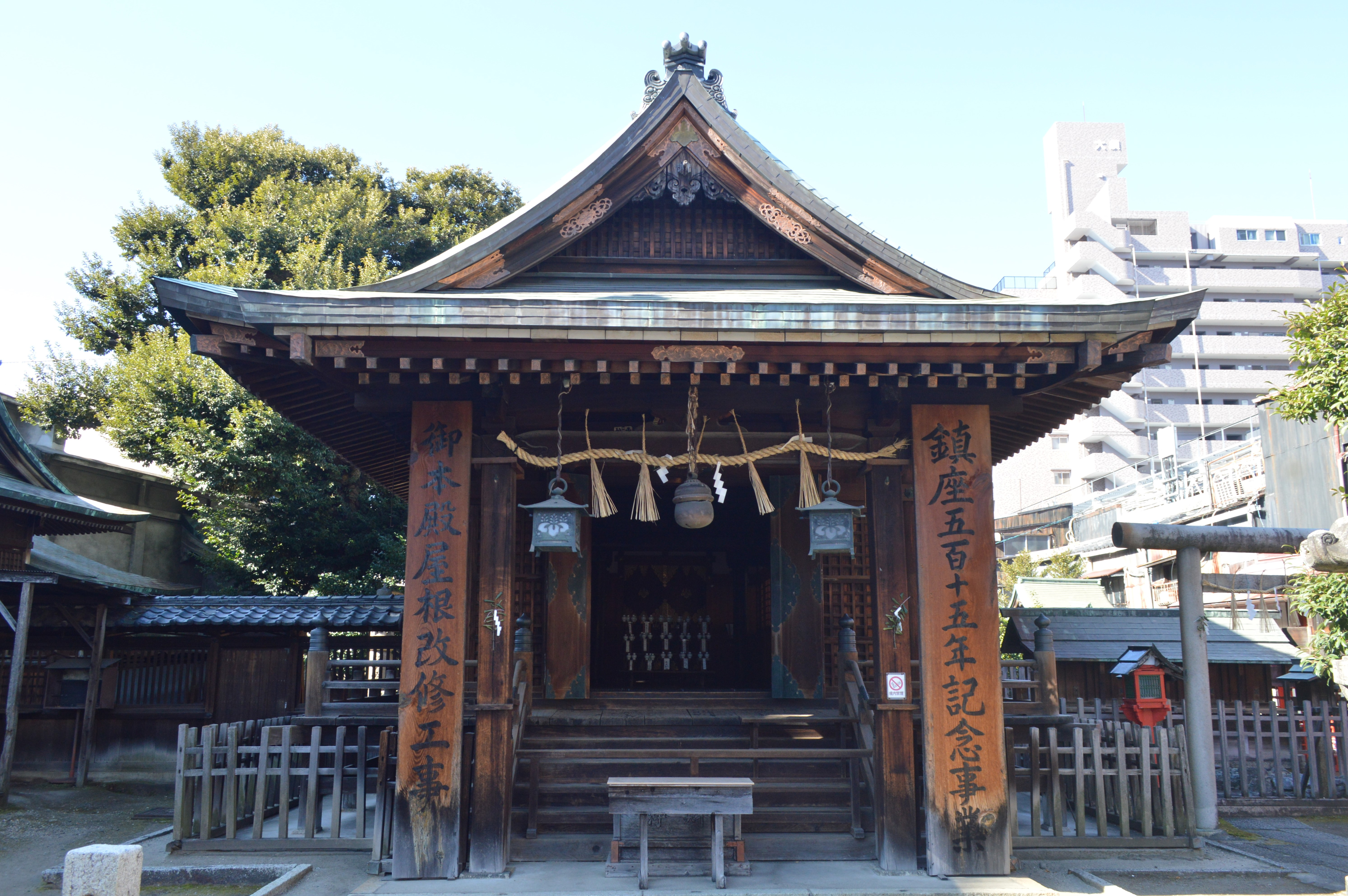
- The Fuji Sengen Shrine in the Naka ward of Nagoya

- Location within Japan

Religion
- Affiliation: Shinto

Location
- Location: Ōsu in central Nagoya, Japan
- Interactive map of Fuji Sengen Shrine (富士浅間神社, Fuji Sengen Jinja)

Architecture
- Established: 1495

The Fuji Sengen Shrine (富士浅間神社, Fuji Sengen Jinja) is a Shinto shrine located in Ōsu in central Nagoya, central Japan.

== History ==
The shrine dates back to 1495, when a portion of the god of Sengen Shrine in Suruga province was solicited to come down and be worshiped. Preserved there is the Yugai-kyakutsuki no tsubo (lidded-and-legged urn), which was found at the nearby ancient grave mound of Nagoyayama. The current shrine buildings date to the Shōwa era.

== See also ==
- Fuji Sengen Shrine (Nishi-ku, Nagoya)
