= Kōriki Tanenobu =

Kōriki Tanenobu (高力種信, 1756 – 1831), better known by his pseudonym Enkōan (猿猴庵, "Monkey Hut"), was a Japanese samurai, amateur illustrator, and chronicler considered as an "inveterate diarist" of the late Edo period (1615–1868). A member of the Kōriki clan, he served in the Owari Domain and is best known for producing over one hundred illustrated books (ehon) that vividly document the cultural spectacles, festivals, and religious exhibitions of his time in and around Nagoya. His works provide a unique glimpse into the leisure and religious life of early modern Japan.

== Career and works ==
From 1772 until his death in 1831, Tanenobu, under the pseudonym Enkōan, created more than one hundred small illustrated books (ehon), blending whimsical drawings with detailed textual commentary. These works, along with his 1778 diary Kinmeiroku, chronicled a wide range of public events in Nagoya, including local festivals, traveling sideshows (misemono), and religious exhibitions known as kaichō—public displays of sacred Buddhist icons and temple treasures.

One of his most notable manuscripts documents the 1819 kaichō exhibition of the Seiryōji Shaka, a famous statue of Shakyamuni Buddha with a legendary history as a traveling icon, held in Nagoya. This work exemplifies Tanenobu's skill in combining text and image to create an immersive experience for readers, effectively offering a virtual visit to the exhibition. His illustrations, though described as amateurish, are celebrated for their charm and ability to capture the carnivalesque atmosphere of Edo-period spectacles.

Tanenobu's writings reflect the increasingly commercial and secularized society of early modern Japan, yet his focus often remained on auspicious and religious subjects, highlighting the interplay between sacred traditions and popular entertainment.

== See also ==
- Edo period
- Owari Domain
- Kaichō
- Japanese art
