= Hori River =

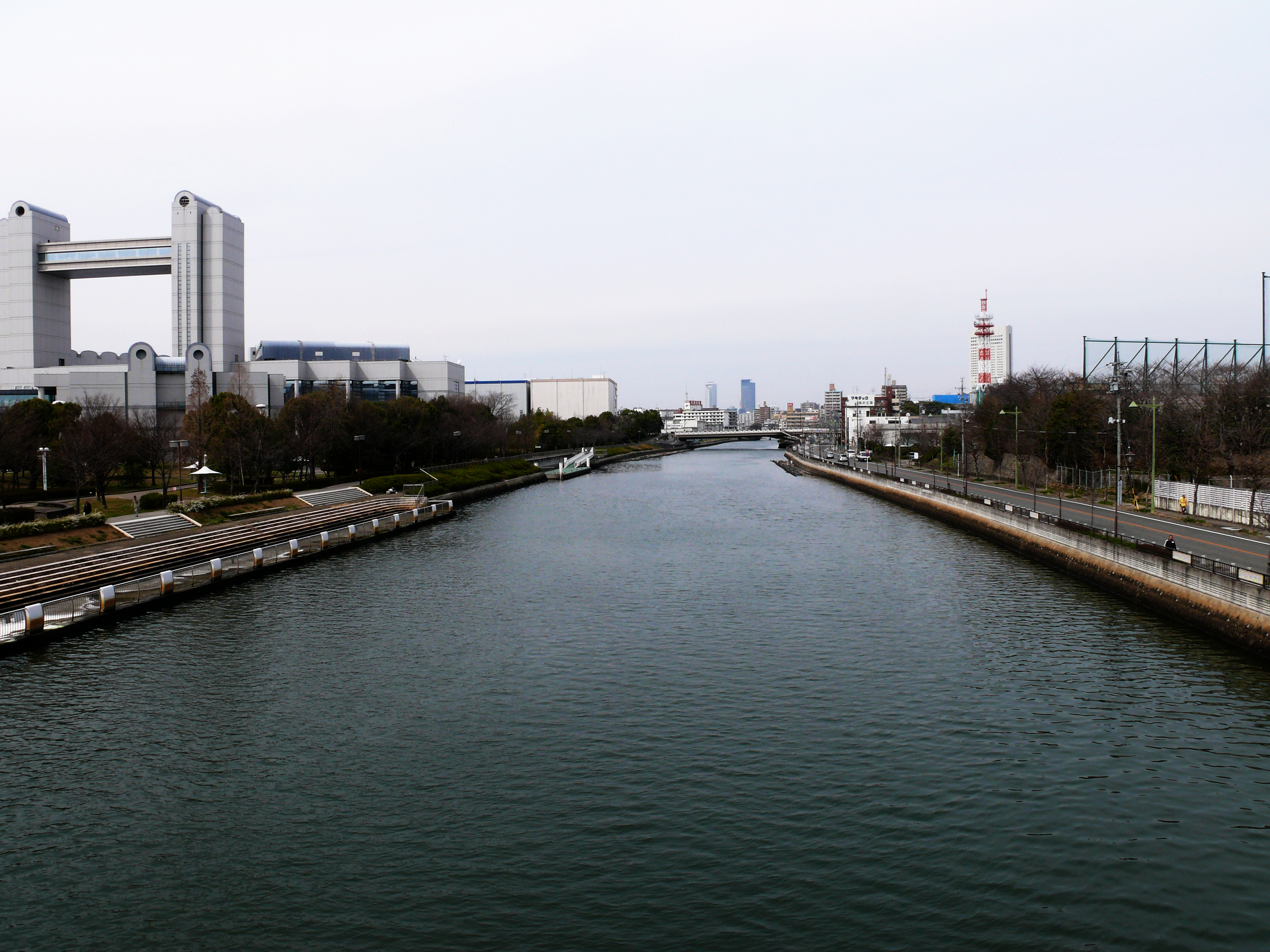
- Upstream direction from the Atsuta-kinen bridge.

- Location within Japan
- Native name: 堀川 (Japanese)

Location
- Country: Japan

Physical characteristics
- Source
  - location: Nagoya
- Mouth
  - location: Ise Bay
  - coordinates: 35°05′20″N 136°53′15″E
  - elevation: 0 m (0 ft)
- Length: 16.2 km (10.1 mi)
- Basin size: 52.5 km^{2} (20.3 sq mi)

Basin features
- River system: Shōnai River

The Hori River (堀川, Hori-kawa) flows north to south through Nagoya, Aichi Prefecture, Japan, and is part of the Shōnai River system. It is 16.2km long. The name translated means "moat river", from its connection to Nagoya Castle's moats.

== History ==
The river is a man-made canal excavated in 1610 during the construction of Nagoya Castle by order of Fukushima Masanori to allow ships to bring goods to the city. The river has influenced the lives of citizens so much that it is traditionally called "Mother River". One of the traditional merchant streets at the canal that leads from the castle is Shikemichi. One of the merchant neighbourhoods was Funairi-chō, located south of the castle.

In modern times, pollution has slowly damaged the water quality until the 1960s, where it peaked. Recently, citizens began collecting signatures to initiate the Horikawa River 1000-Citizen Survey Network. In September 2003, this proposal was officially adopted.

The Horikawa Lions Club and others set out to recruit 1,000 citizens. However, during the two-month application period, they exceeded expectations, receiving applications from 217 individual groups and 2,007 citizens in total.

With the help of these volunteers, the Nagoya City Council carried out experiments aimed at clarification of the river. These included the advance treatment at the Meijo Sewage Treatment Plant, diverting water from Nabeya-Ueno Water Clarification plant and the transmission of underground water.

A measurable change in the quality of the water occurred. In addition, on February 13, 2007, Nagoya City announced the start of a new three-year experiment, transmitting the raw water from the Kiso River to the Horikawa River. This represented a major step in fulfilling the citizens' dreams.
