= Fuji Sengen Shrine (Nishi-ku, Nagoya) =

Shinto shrine in Nagoya, Japan

Coordinates: 35.1805185°N 136.8947367°E

Fuji Sengen Shrine (富士浅間神社, Fuji Sengen Jinja)
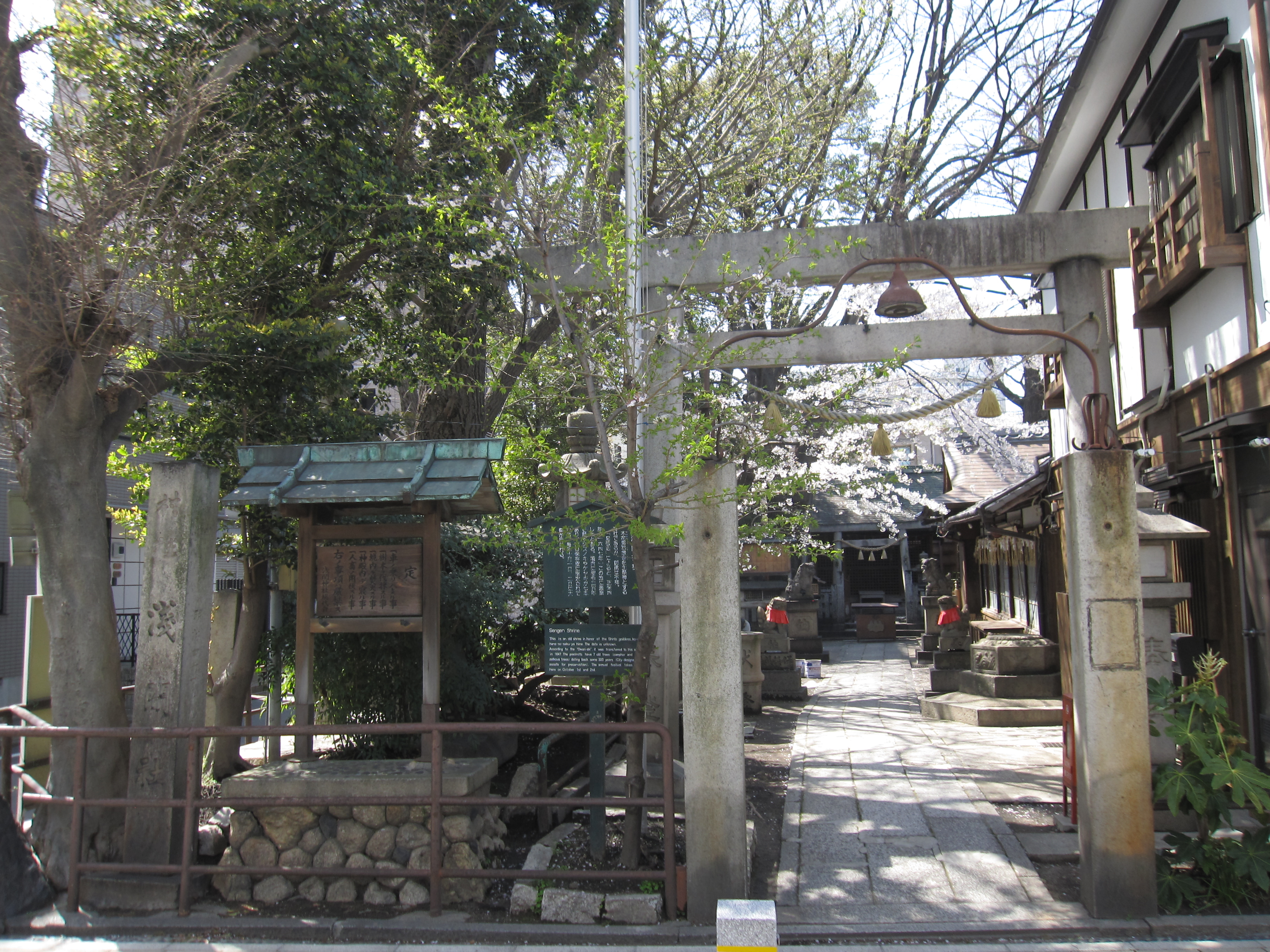
- The Fuji Sengen Shrine in the West ward of Nagoya

Religion
- Affiliation: Shinto

Location
- Interactive map of Fuji Sengen Shrine (富士浅間神社, Fuji Sengen Jinja)

The Fuji Sengen Shrine (富士浅間神社, Fuji Sengen Jinja) is a Shinto shrine located at the historic Shikemichi in Nishi-ku, Nagoya, central Japan. The shrine is dedicated to the goddess Ko-no-hana-no-saku-ya hime.

== History ==
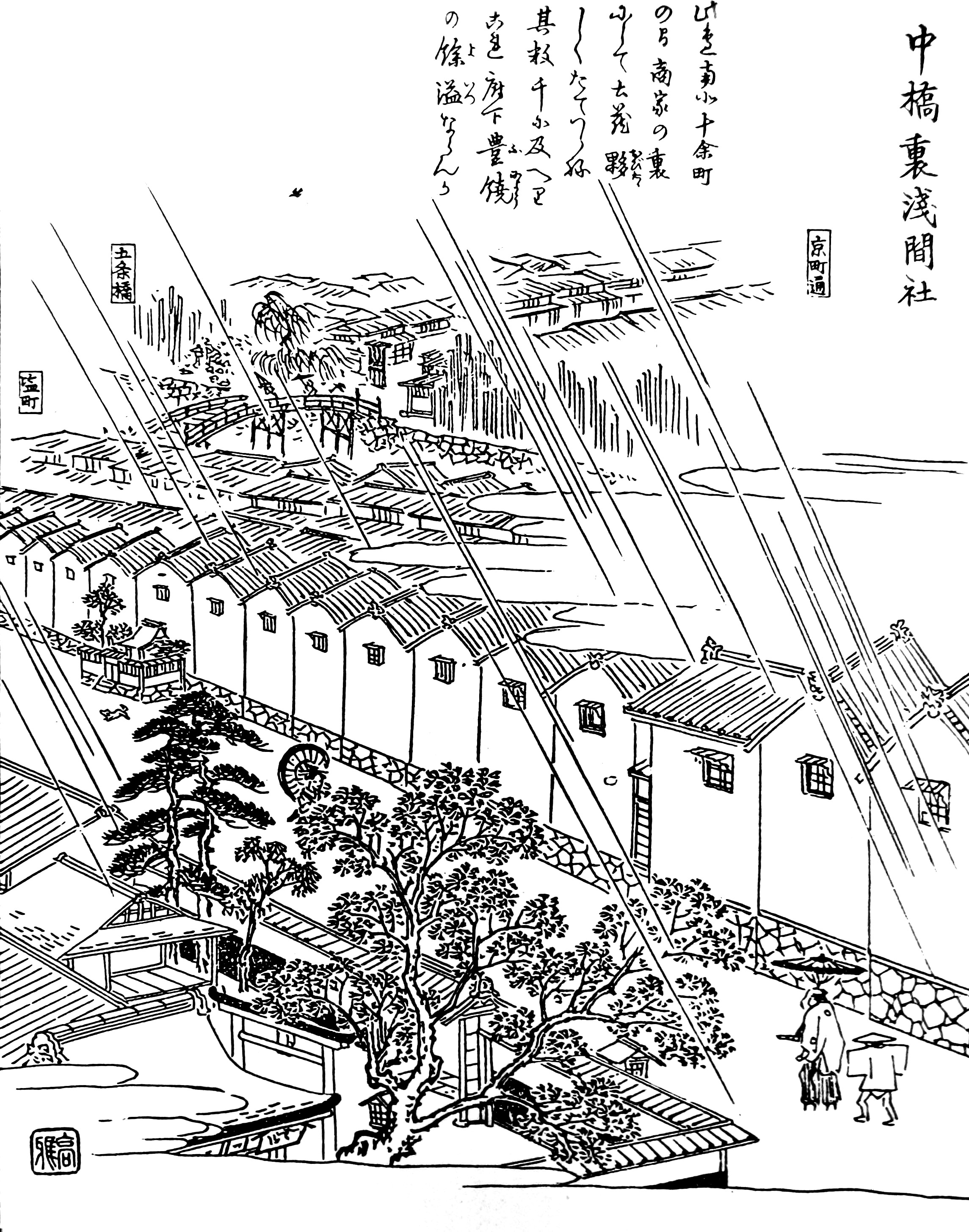
Woodblock print of the Shikemichi, depicting the Sengen shrine at the lower part, and the Gojō bridge over the Hori river in the upper part. (Depiction from the Owari meisho zue, 19th century)

According to the historic "Owari-shi", it was transferred to this site in 1647. The site has seven old camphor and zelkova trees, some of which date back to 300 years. It is designated by the city as an asset for preservation.

A stone torii gate is the entrance, a small stone path lined with protective animal statues leads to the main shrine.

The annual shrine festival takes place on October 1–2.

== See also ==
- Fuji Sengen Shrine (Naka-ku, Nagoya)
