= Nagoya City Museum =

Museum in Nagoya, Aichi, Japan

Coordinates: 35°08′10.99″N 136°56′05.61″E

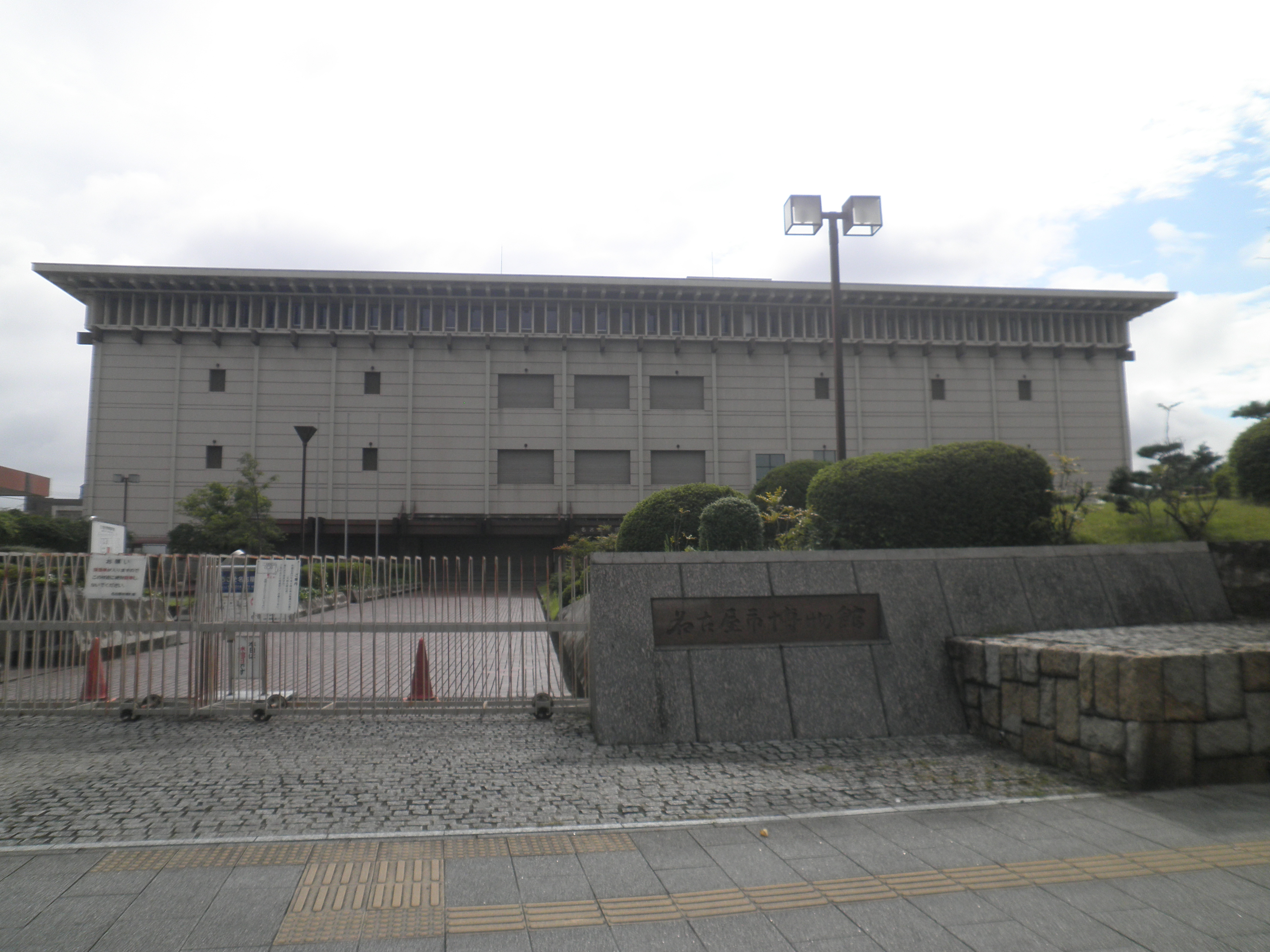
Nagoya City Museum

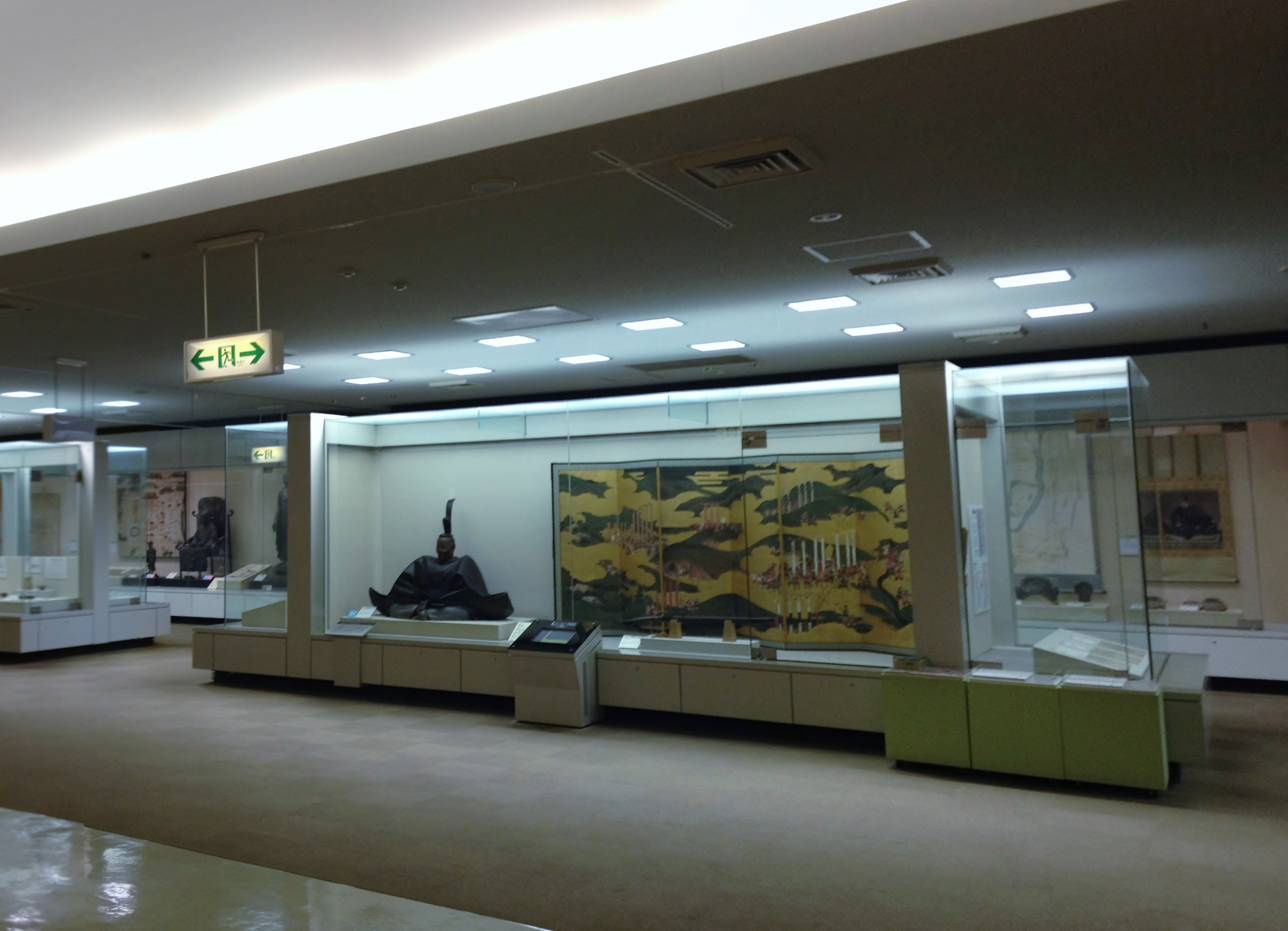
Interior into one of the exhibits

The Nagoya City Museum (名古屋市博物館, Nagoya-shi hakubutsukan) is a museum of the city of Nagoya in Aichi Prefecture, Japan.

The Nagoya City Museum was established in 1977. Its collection includes archaeological materials, fine art, crafts, documents, books and folk materials including samurai armor and weaponry, many of which are put on exhibition. It also owns a collection of rare Kawana ware.

In addition to the permanent exhibition of the history of the Owari Domain starting from the Paleolithic period, special exhibitions and thematic exhibitions take place around every five to seven years, such as the one on Gandhara in 2003.

A memorandum of understanding and cooperation was signed in January 2000 with the Vienna Museum, establishing it as a partner museum.

The nearest stop by subway is Sakurayama Station on the Sakura-dōri Line.
