= Ōsu =

Historic area in Japan

Coordinates: 35°9′31.874″N 136°54′13.468″E

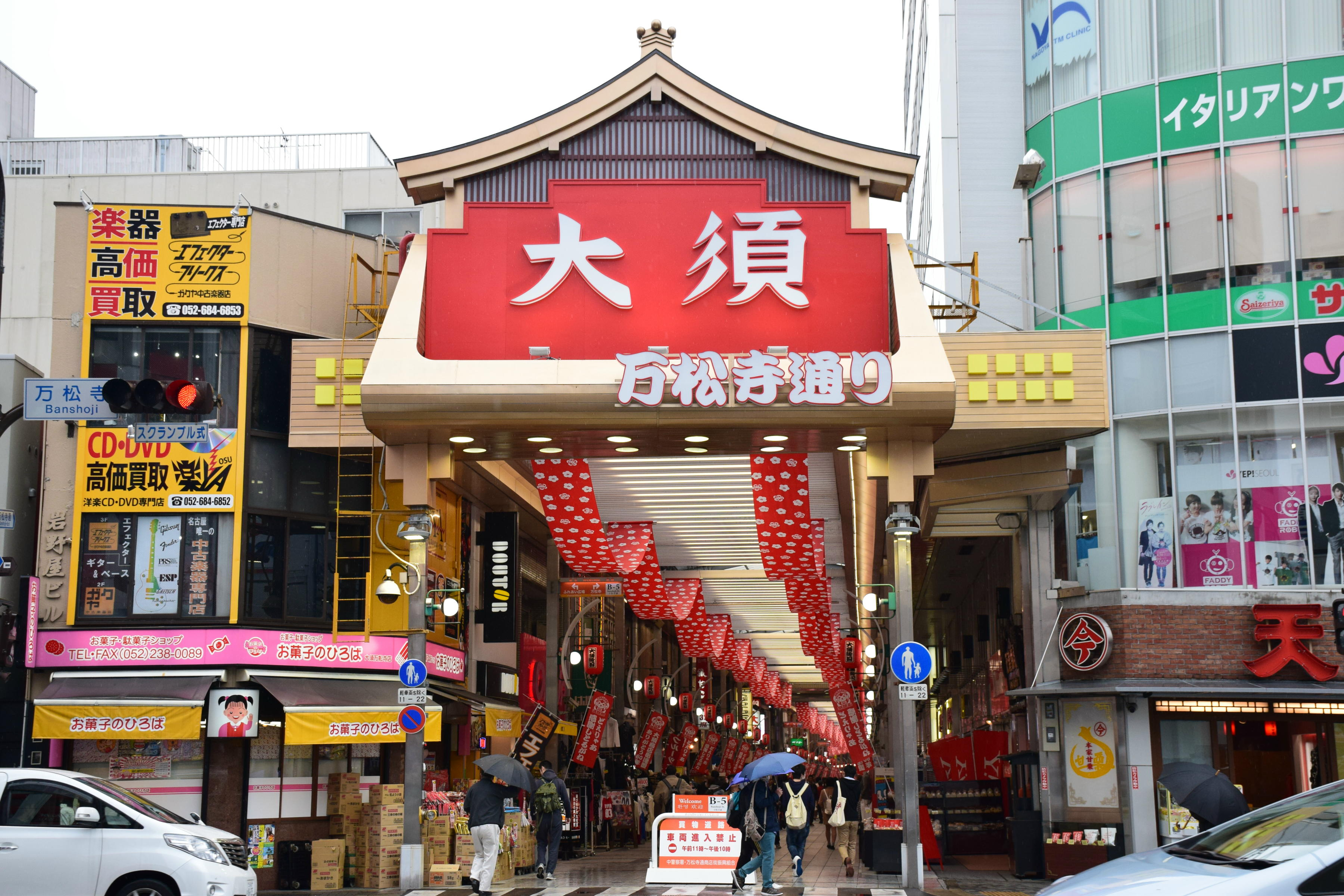
Ōsu shopping street

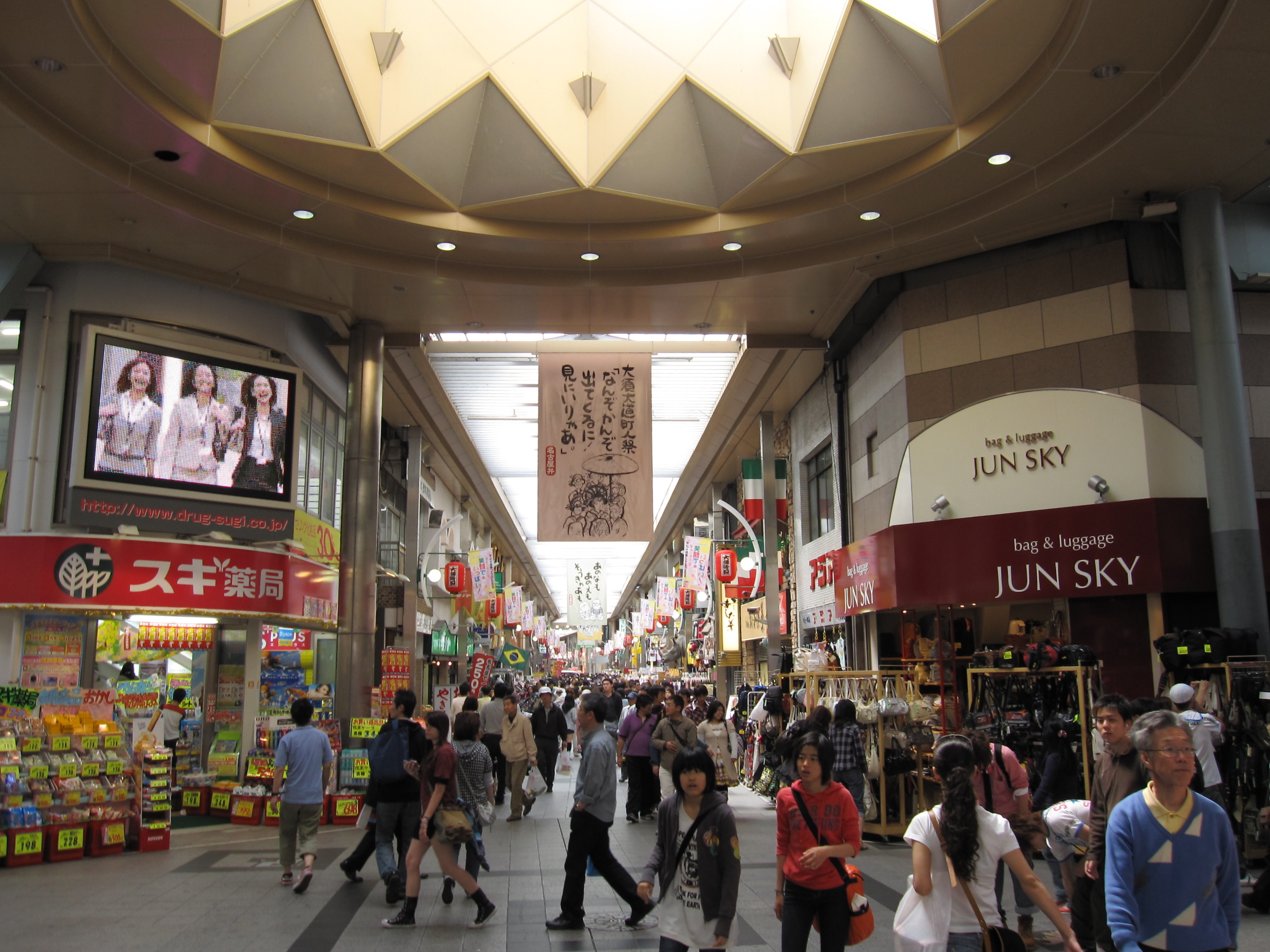
One of the main shopping streets of Ōsu

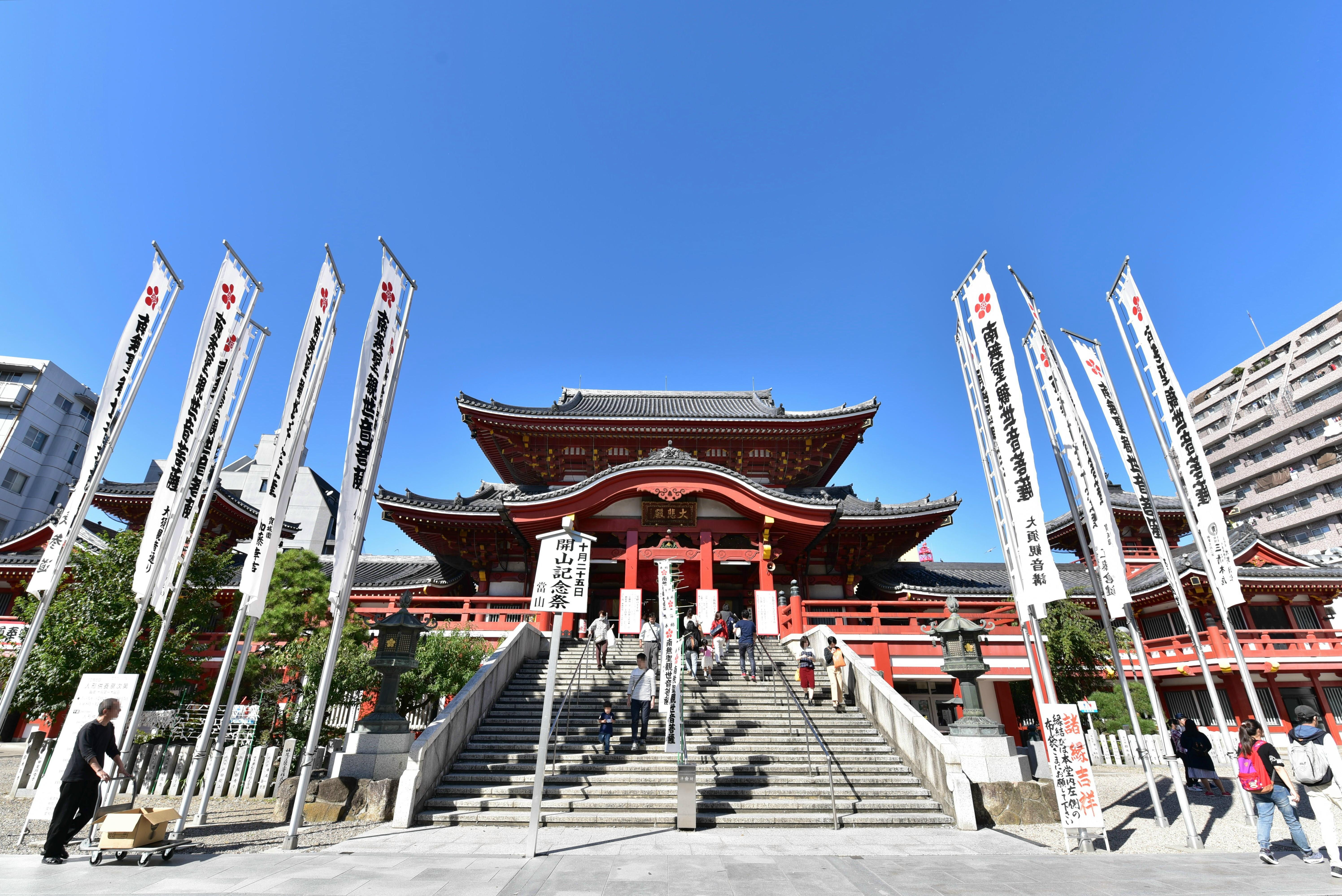
Ōsu Kannon

Ōsu (Japanese: 大須) is an area located in the Naka ward of Nagoya, central Japan.

Ōsu is a historic area which has many small shops offering everything from Japanese traditional food to handicrafts. A large department store is OSU301. It is popular amongst fashionable young people as well.

The Ōsu Street Performer's Festival (大須大道町人祭, Ōsu Daido-chonin Matsuri) is held every year in October. The highlight is the parade of the oiran.

There are a number of temples and shrines and religious institutions in this area. The most important ones are Ōsu Kannon (大須観音) and Banshō-ji (万松寺) and not far away is Hongan-ji Betsuin temple (本願寺派名古屋別院).

Ōsu Kannon Station is located at Ōsu.

== Ryukasui at Seijuin ==
Ryukasui was said to be one of three of the highest quality water springs in Owari Province. It was supplied from a well in front of the gate of Seijuin, which was abolished around 1870 during the religious reforms of the Meiji era. Ryukasui was generally used as an offering and when the Shōgun stopped there on his way to Kyoto, it was presented to him as drinking water.
