= Bombing of Nagoya =

Air raids on Nagoya, Japan (1942–45)

- Part of the air raids on Japan, as part of the Pacific War
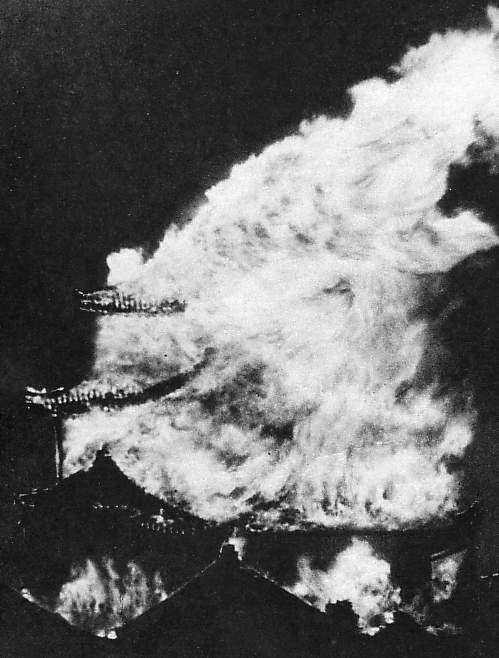
- The main tower of Nagoya castle on fire, May 14, 1945.
Date	1944–1945
Location	Nagoya, Japan
Result	American victory

Belligerents
United States	Japan

The bombing of Nagoya (名古屋大空襲, Nagoya daikūshū) by the United States Army Air Forces took place as part of the air raids on Japan during the closing months of the Pacific War in 1945.

1944-45 "Hesitation Upwind", Nagoya Bombing Mission narrated by Ronald Reagan, First Motion Picture Unit Training Film, U.S. Army Air Forces

== History ==
The first strategic bombing attack on Nagoya was on April 18, 1942, as part of the Doolittle Raid. A B-25 bomber targeted the Mitsubishi Aircraft Works, the Matsuhigecho oil warehouse, the Nagoya Castle military barracks, and the Nagoya war industries plant. However, it was not until the aerial attacks of 1944 and 1945 that Nagoya would suffer serious bomb damage.

According to the United States Strategic Bombing Survey, during the last 9 months of the Pacific War 14,054 tons of bombs were dropped in precision and area air attacks on the factories and urban areas of Nagoya. No Japanese city other than Tokyo received as many attacks. Nagoya was attacked 21 times between December 13, 1944 and July 24, 1945. The aim of the attacks was stated as "(1) mainly by precision attacks, to wipe out Nagoya's aircraft production and, later on, its ordnance production, and (2) mainly by area attacks, to knock out the city's remaining industries and to destroy the people's will to resist."

The second phase began with precision bombing on December 13, 1944, targeting a Mitsubishi military factory. Four bombers were badly damaged during the mission and had to be abandoned. On December 18, another bombing raid took place, although there was such heavy cloud that the bombers needed to bomb by radar. Japanese fighter aircraft intercepted the attacking bombers and shot down one. On January 3, 1945, there was a general firebombing of the city. On January 14, 1945, Mitsubishi plants were attacked again.

On March 11 or 12 (sources vary) and March 19, 1945, there were large air raids and widespread firebombing. On April 7, 1945, another precision bombing attack hit and destroyed most of the Mitsubishi Aircraft Engine Works. On May 14 and 16, 1945, there were large air raids and widespread firebombing that targeted the Mitsubishi factories and other war industries, the arsenal, railroad freight yards, and the seaport. Nagoya Castle, a national treasure which was being used as a military command post, was hit during the May 14 raid and burned down.

During the winter of 1944 and spring of 1945 there were random single-bomber attacks that were used as psychological warfare to disrupt the city and damage the morale of the citizens. It is estimated that 113,460 buildings were destroyed during the raids, with 3,866 people killed and 471,701 driven from their homes. On July 26, 1945 the Enola Gay also dropped a conventional "pumpkin bomb" in the Yagoto area of Nagoya as part of a bombing raid to train for the upcoming nuclear bombing mission to Hiroshima.

Nagoya was targeted for incendiary bombing because it was the center of the Japanese aircraft industry at the time. Nagoya produced between forty and fifty percent of Japan's combat aircraft and engines, including the Mitsubishi A6M Zero. Nagoya housed a port capable of holding 38 ships of up to 10,000 tons and produced equipment for the war effort including railway equipment, ball bearings and processed food.

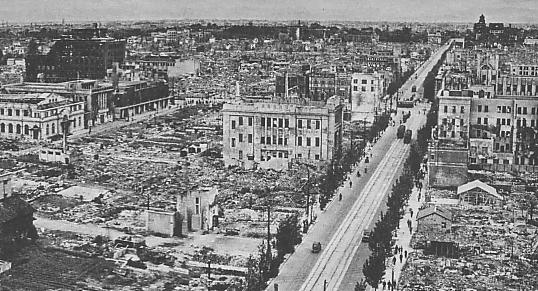
Nagoya, after the 1945 bombing

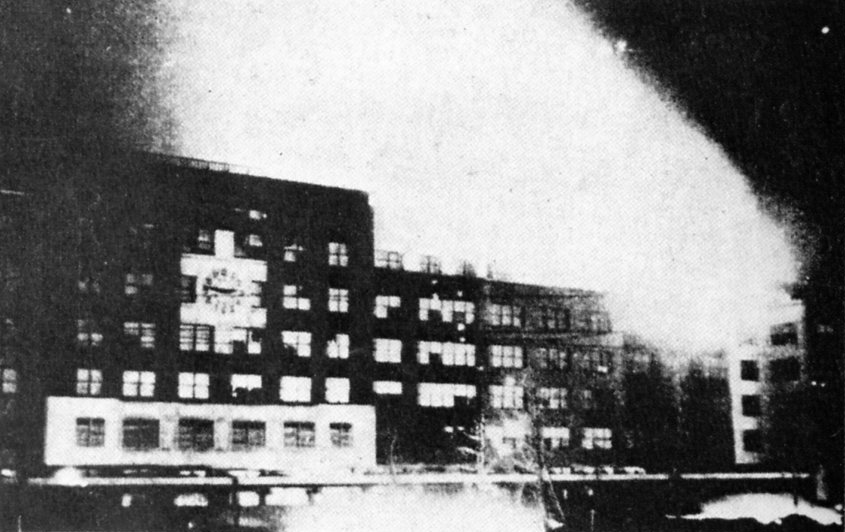
Nagoya Station in flames, March 19.

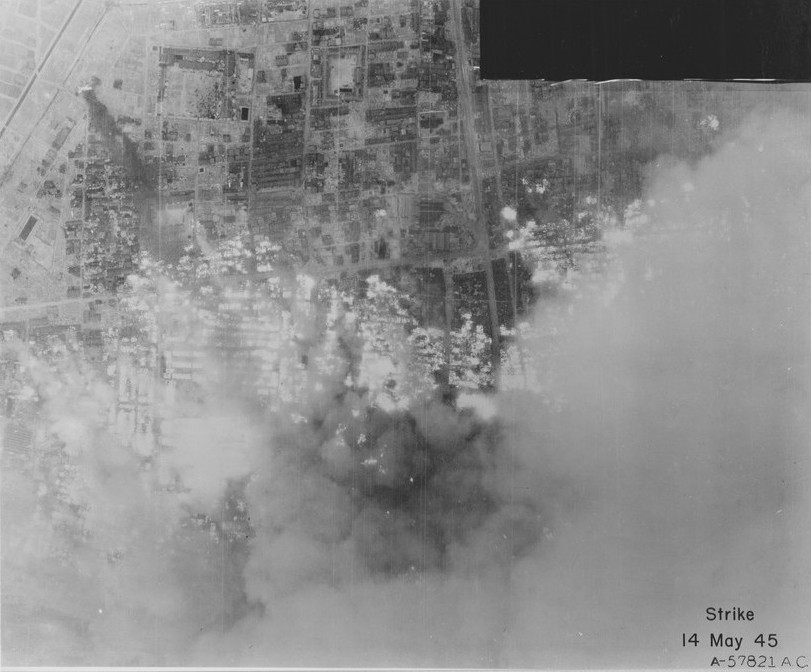
Nagoya, Japan during an air attack, seen from an American aircraft - 14 May 1945

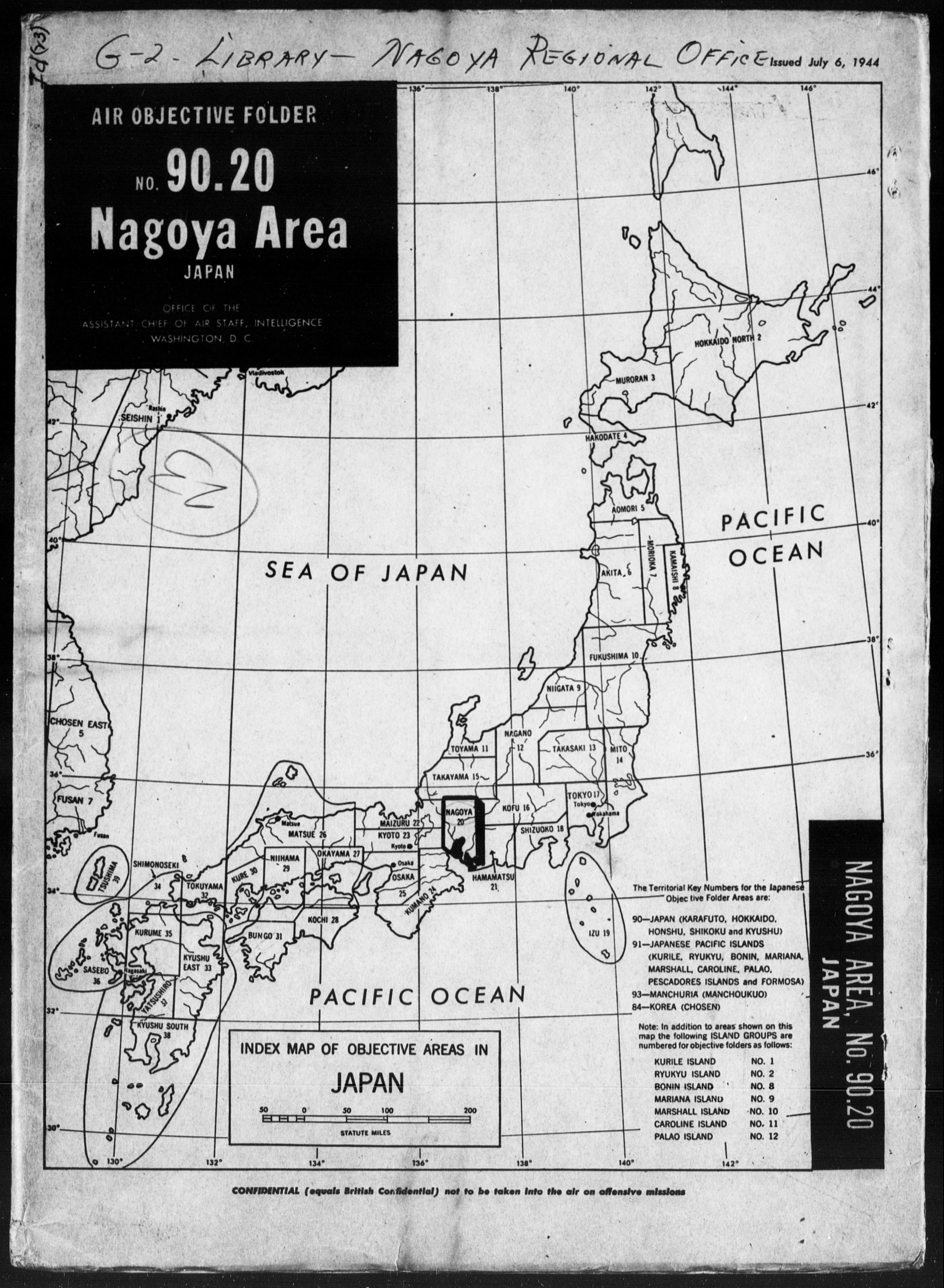
Air Objective Folders by Target Area: Japan: Nagoya area, July 6, 1944

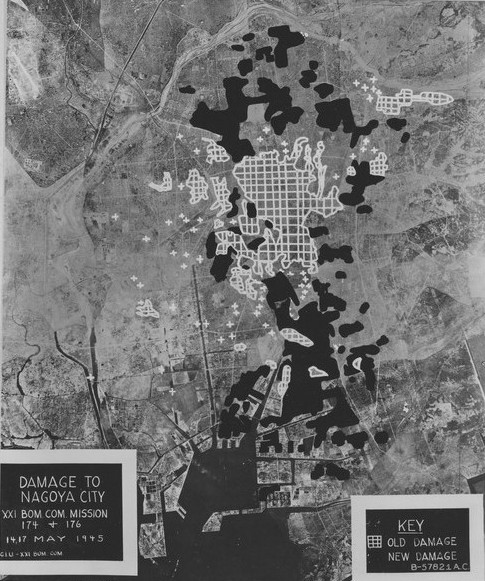
Damage Survey of Nagoya City by the XXI Bomber Command

== See also ==
- Evacuations of civilians in Japan during World War II
- Grave of the Fireflies (short story), a semi-autobiographical short story set during the bombing
  - Grave of the Fireflies, an anime film based on the novel
