= Fushimi, Nagoya =

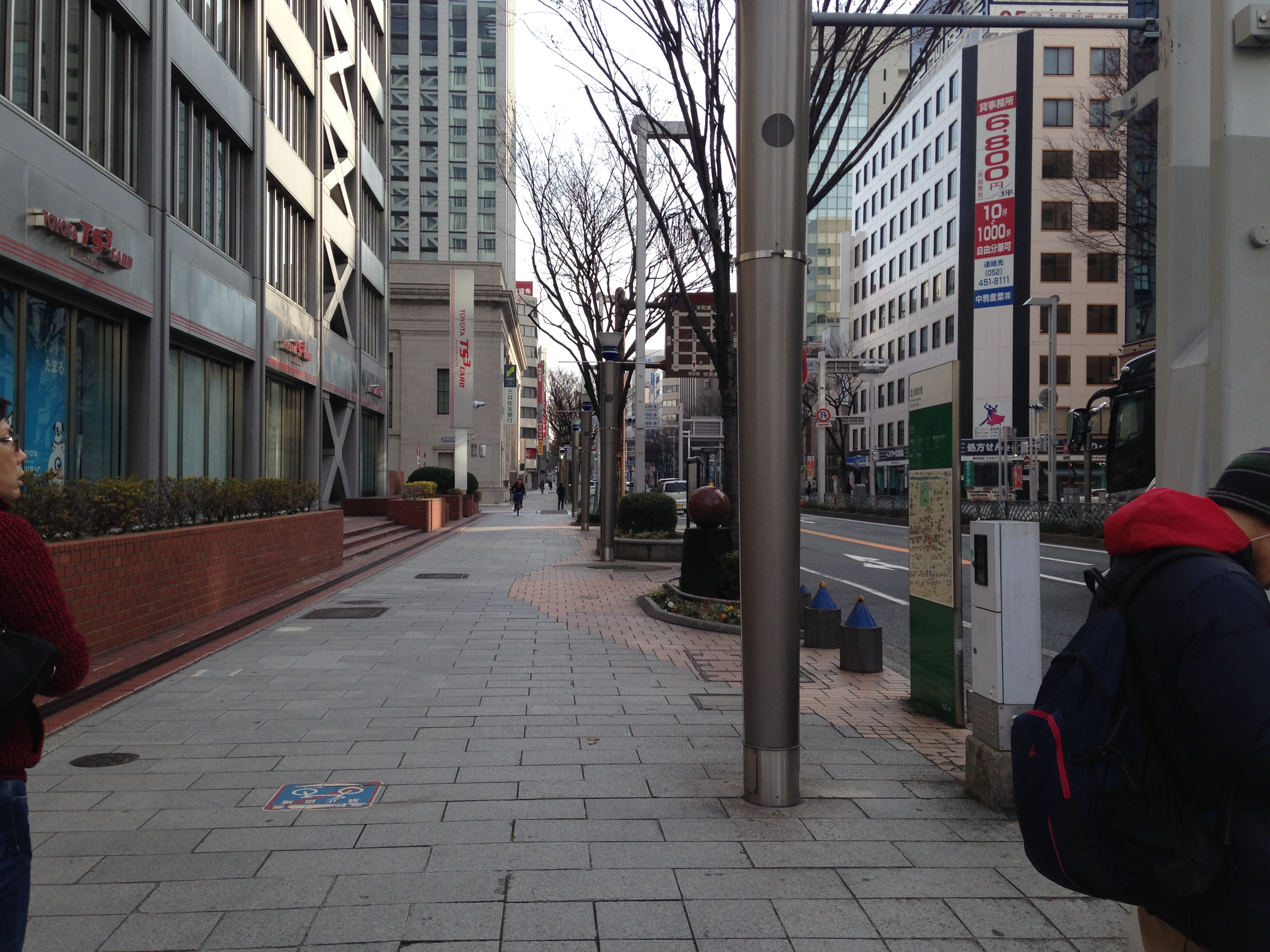
Street view of Hirokoji-dori Street from Hirokoji-Fushimi Crossroads (east)

Fushimi (伏見) is an area located in Nishiki, Naka-ku, Nagoya, central Japan.

== History ==
It was originally called Fushimi-chō (伏見町), which was abolished as an official administrative unit in 1966. Funairi-chōis located immediately to the west. The nearest station is Fushimi Station on the Nagoya Municipal Subway. The Fushimi Underground Shopping Street extends along the railway line from the ticket gate. Fukuromachi-dori (長者町繊維街) at the northern part of the station was bustling with textile stores after the war. Today, there are shops selling textiles, clothing, and miscellaneous goods, as well as interior shops and cafes. The area around the station is a financial and office district. There are also theatres, museums, and science museums.

== Main points ==
- Shirakawa Park
  - Nagoya City Science Museum
  - Nagoya City Art Museum
- Misono-za
- Electricity Museum, Nagoya
- Shirakawa Hall
- Nagoya Kanko Hotel
- Hilton Nagoya
- Nagoya Crown Hotel
- Asahi Shimbun Nagoya Head Office
- Yomiuri Shimbun Chubu Branch
- Shin-Nagoya Musical Theater
- Nagoya Chamber of Commerce and Industry
- Bank of Japan Nagoya Branch
- Nagoya City Fire Department Naka Fire Department
- Fushimi Underground Shopping Street
- Nagoya Intercity
- NTT Data Fushimi Building
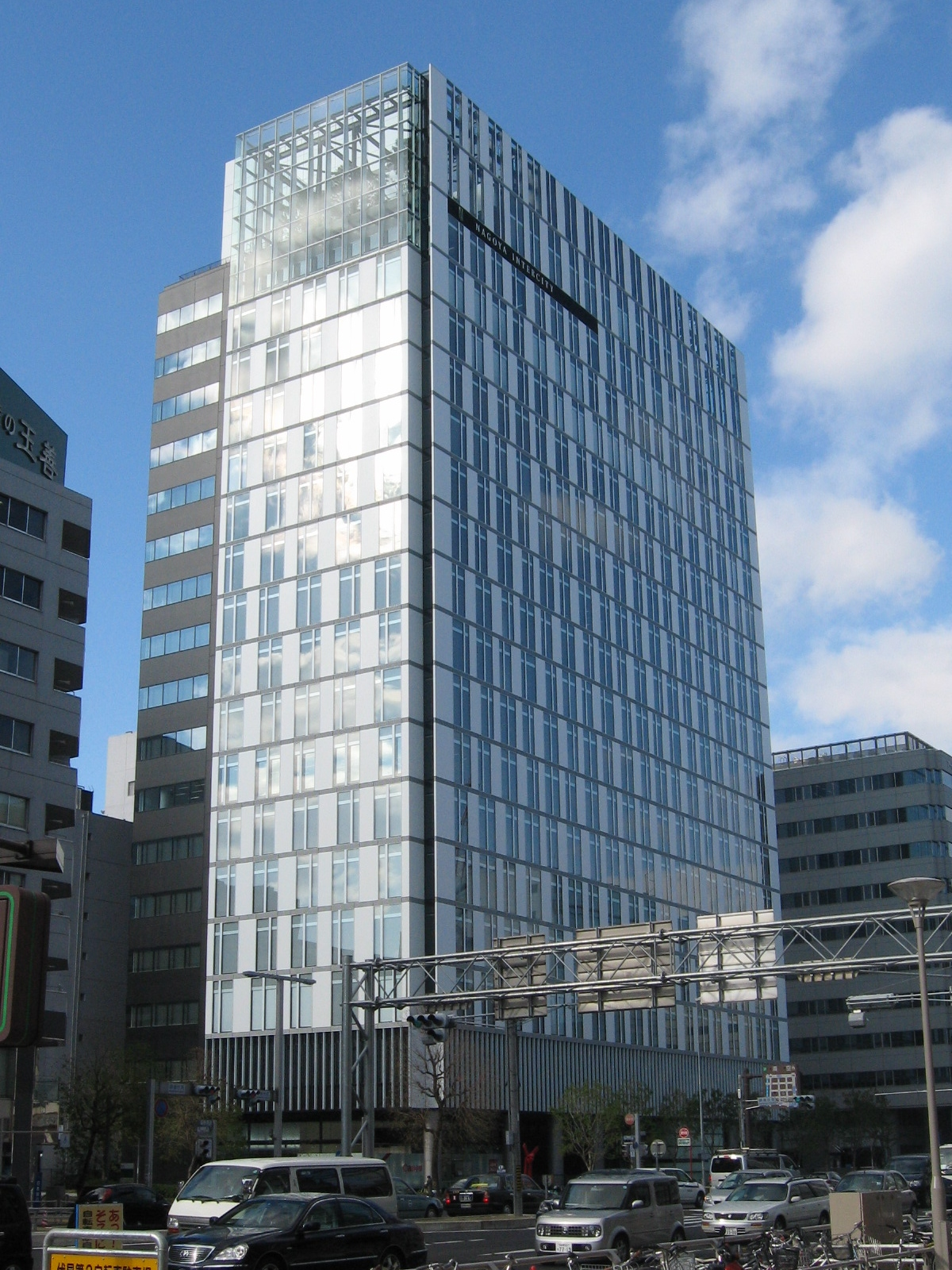
Nagoya Intercity

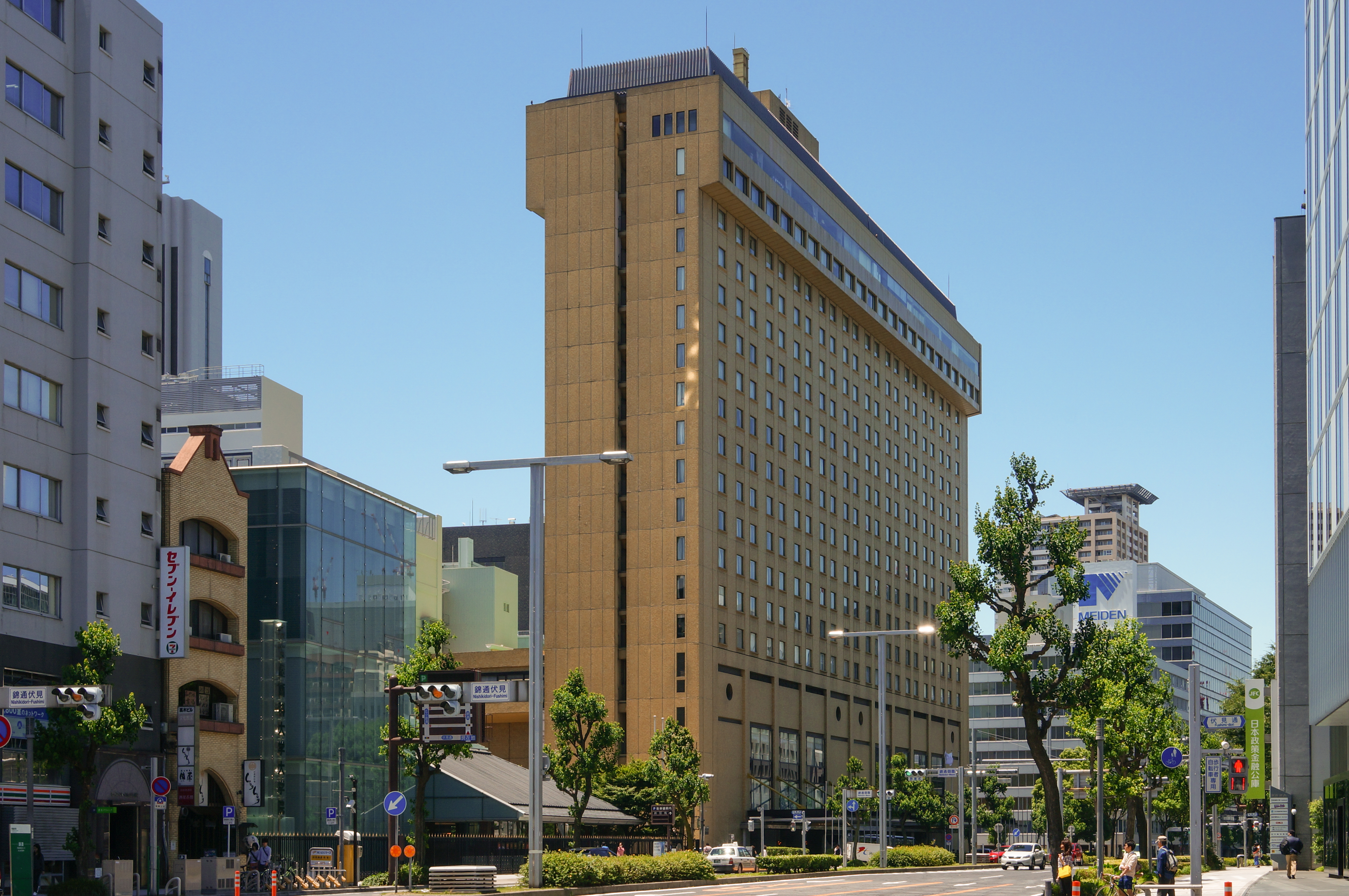
Nagoya Kanko Hotel

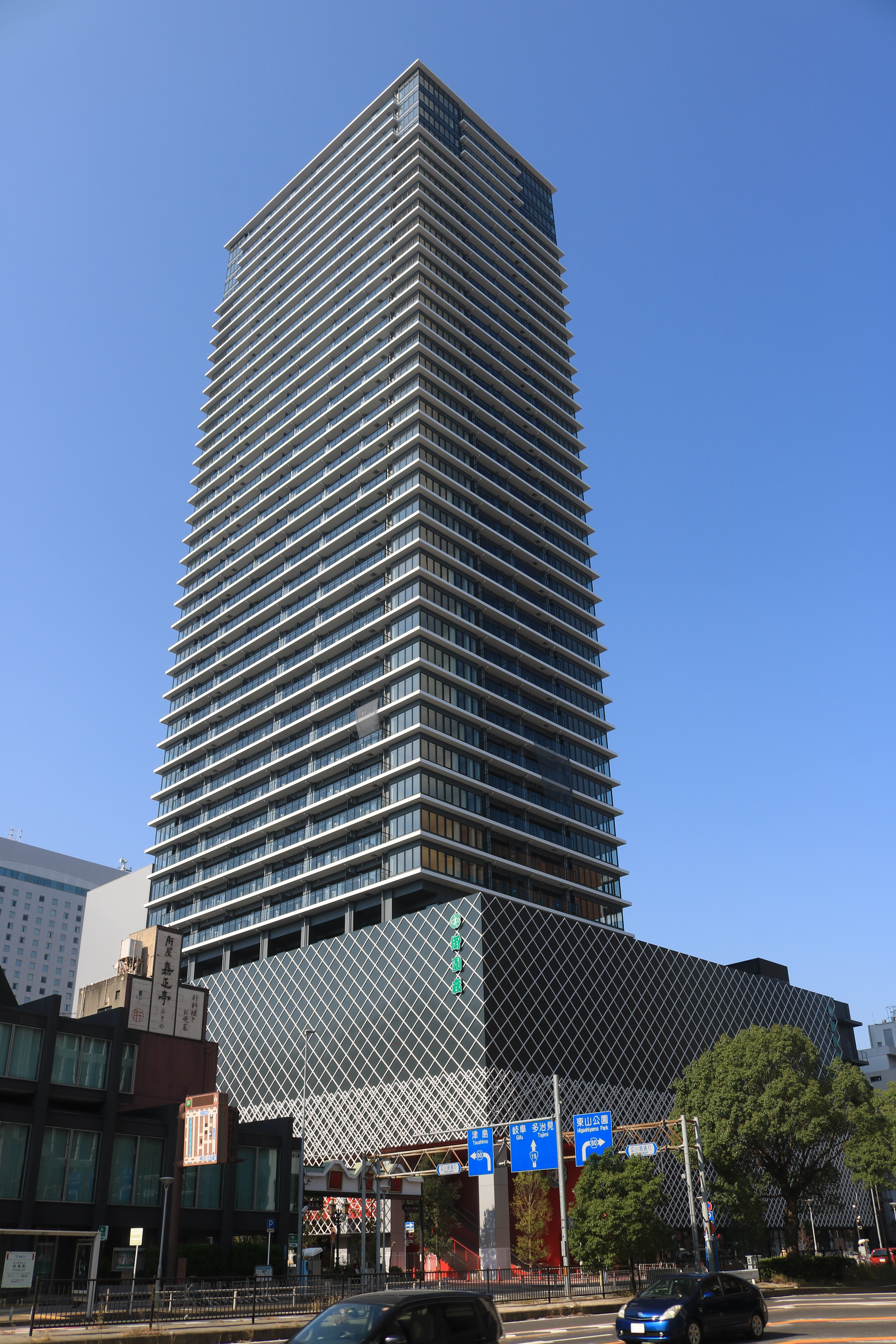
Misono-za theatre and tower

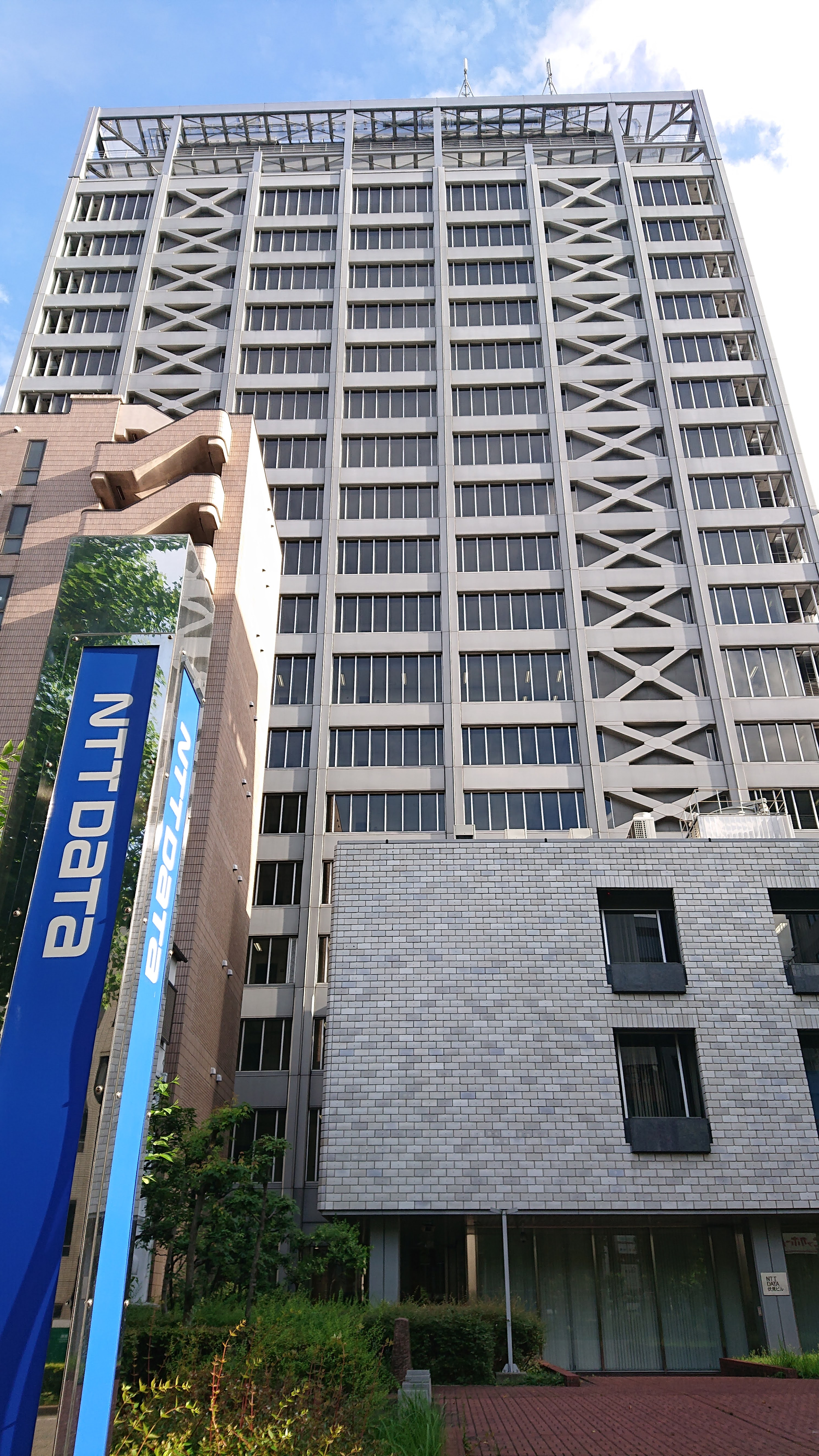
NTT Data Fushimi Building

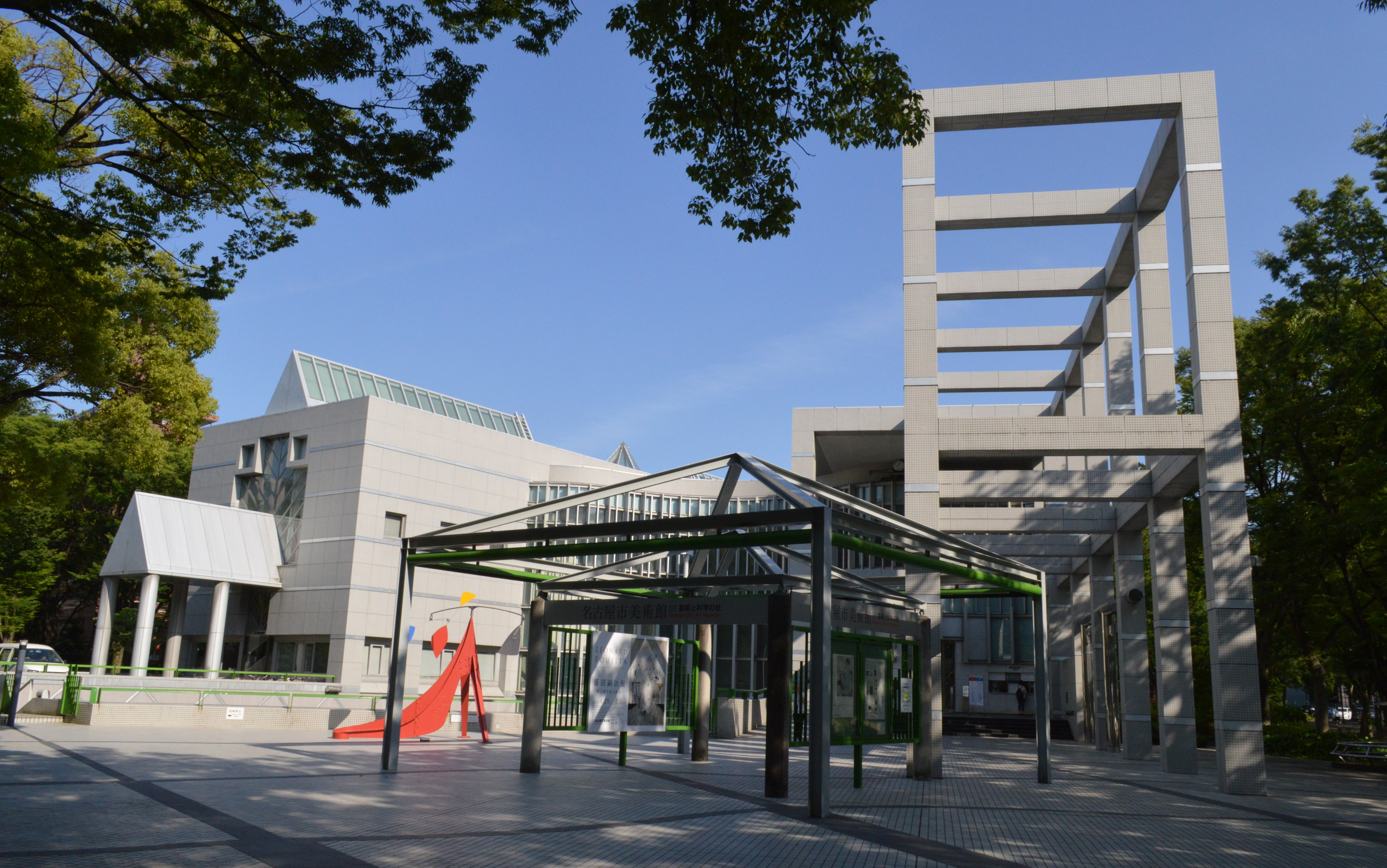
Nagoya City Art Museum

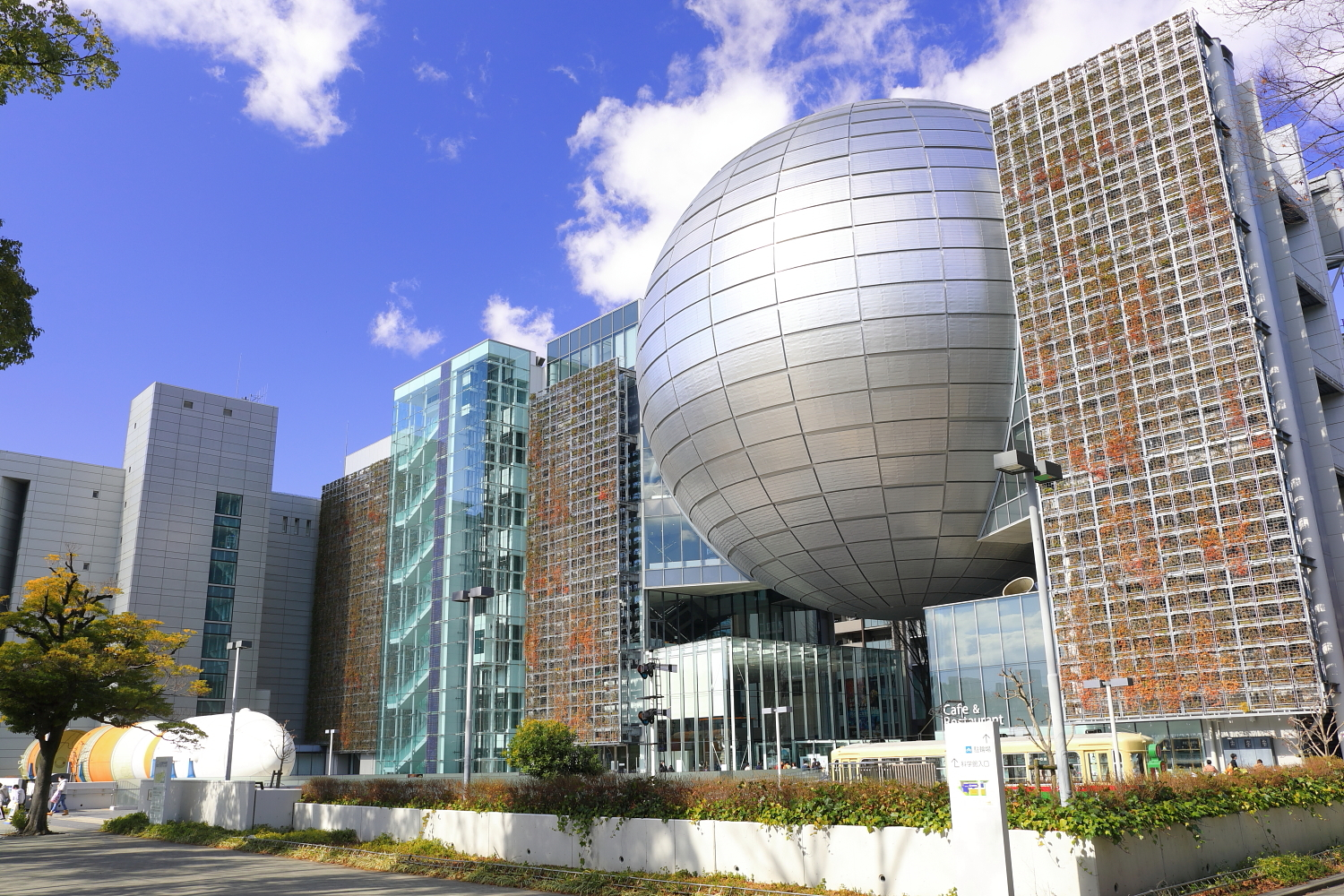
Nagoya City Science Museum

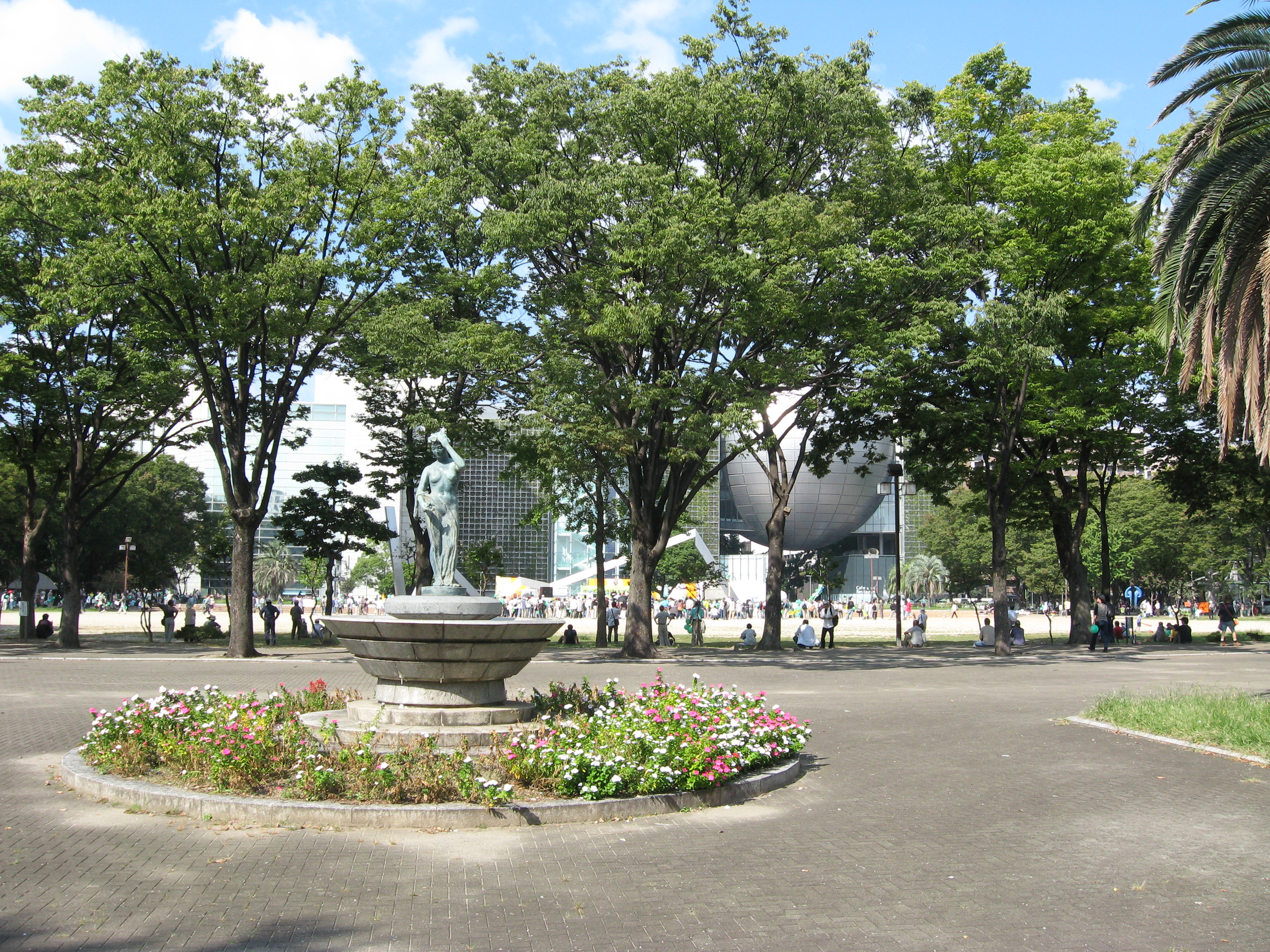
Shirakawa Park

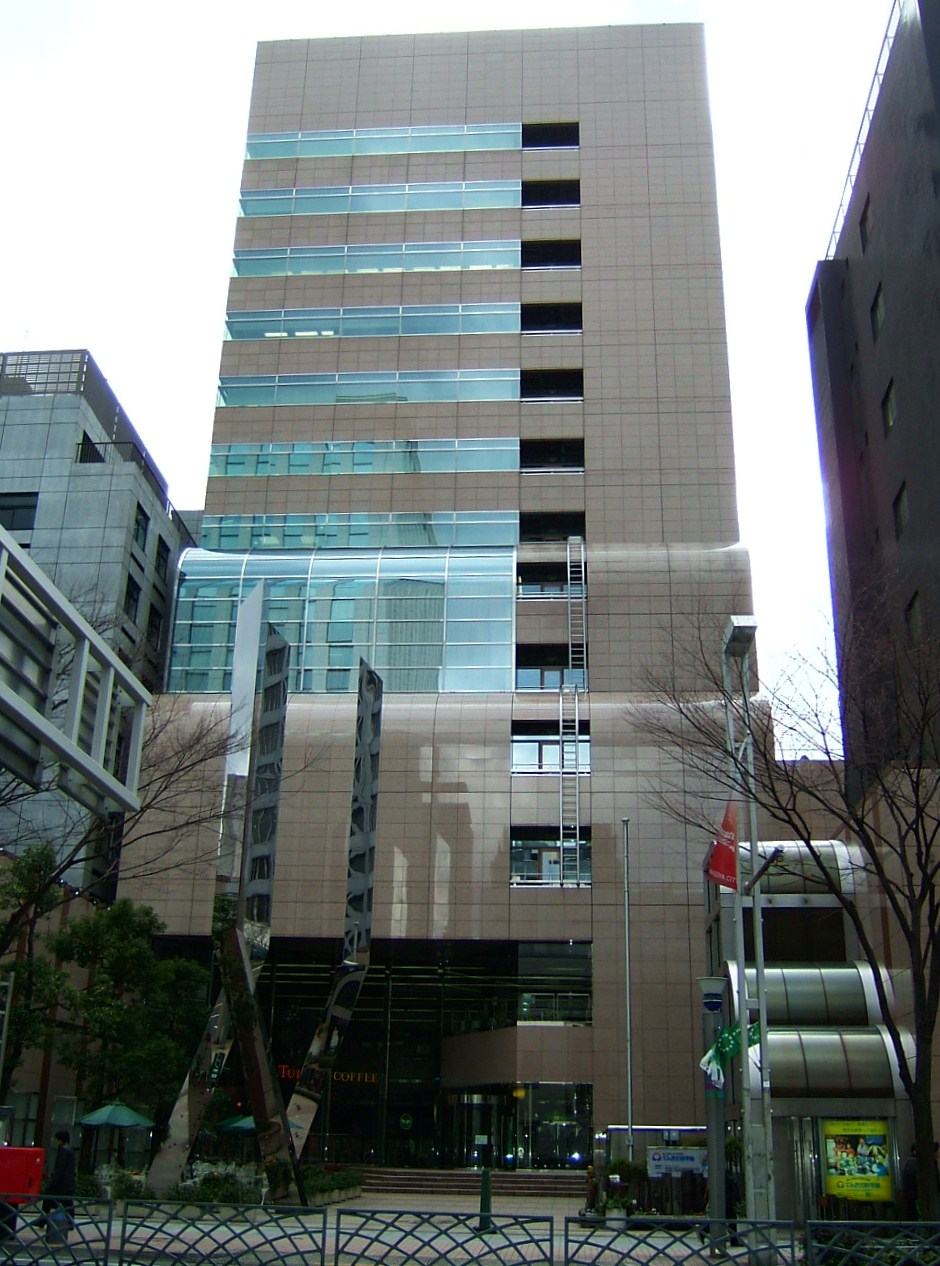
Electricity Museum, Nagoya

== Traffic ==
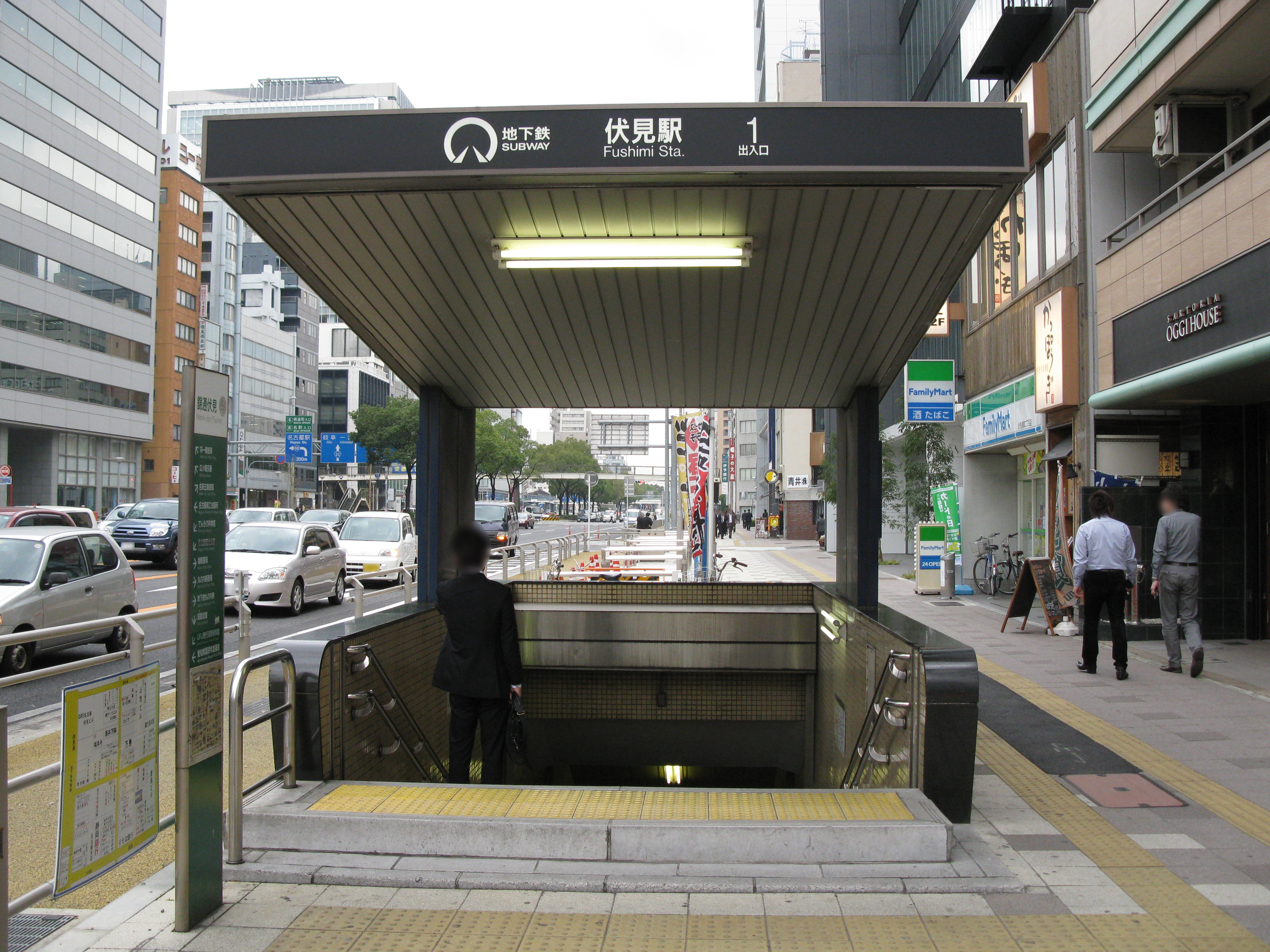
Entrance No.1 of Fushimi subway station

- Fushimi Station (Nagoya) serviced by the Nagoya Municipal Subway Higashiyama Line / Tsurumai Line
- "Hirokoji Fushimi" stop Nagoya Municipal Bus
- Fushimi-dōri (National Route 19 and National Route 22)
- Nishiki-dōri
- Hirokoji Street (Aichi Prefectural Road No. 60 Nagoya Nagakutede Line)
