= Electricity Museum =

Electricity Museum may refer to:

- Electricity Museum, Nagoya
- Electricity Museum (Portugal)
