= Nara Hotel =

Hotel in Nara, Japan

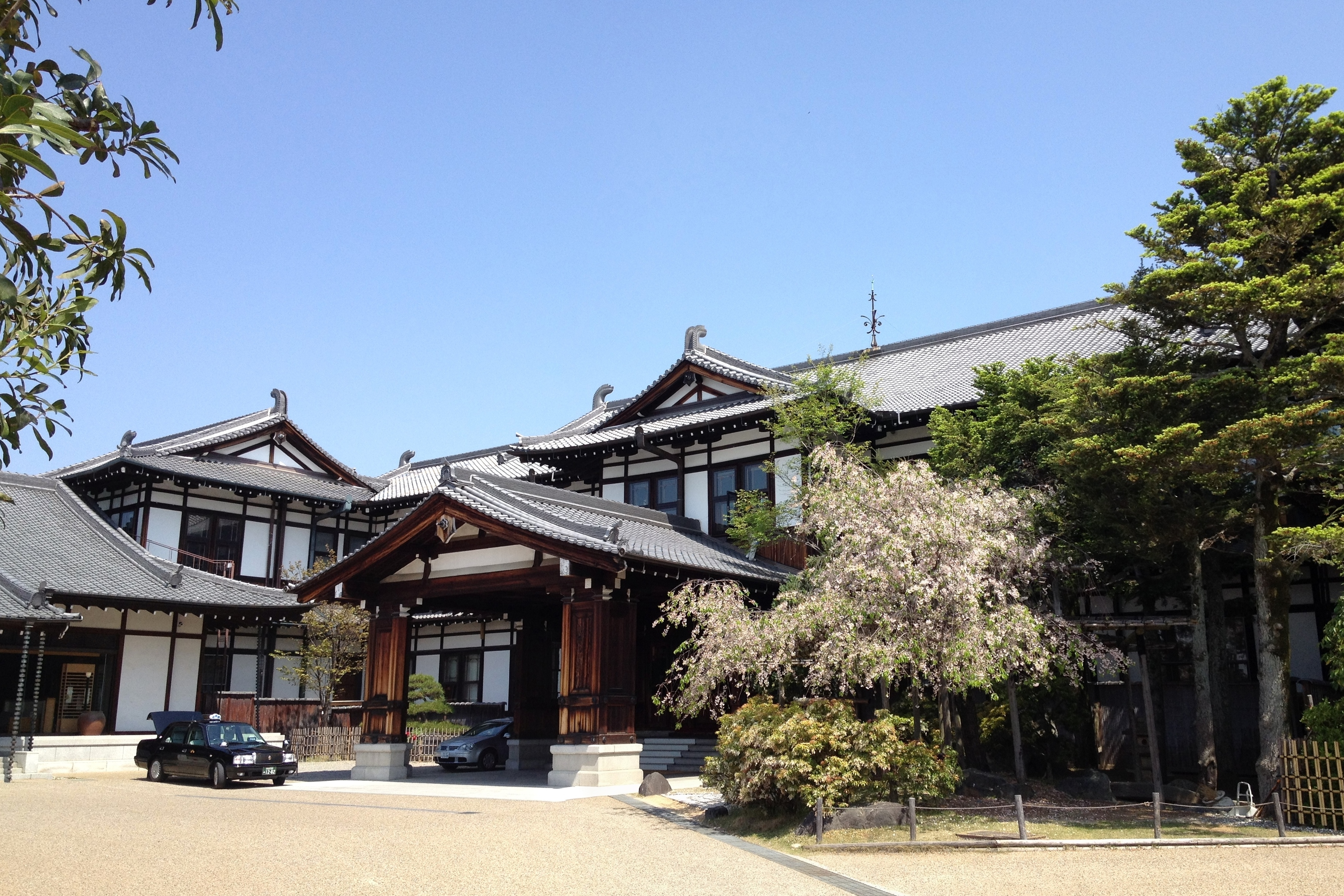

- Location within Japan
- Hotel chain: JR Hotel Group / Miyako Hotels & Resorts

General information
- Location: 1096 Takabatake-chō, Nara, Nara, Japan
- Coordinates: 34°40′48.1″N 135°50′1.8″E
- Opening: October 17, 1909
- Owner: West Japan Railway Company
- Operator: Nara Hotel Co., Ltd.

Technical details
- Floor count: 3

Design and construction
- Architect: Yasushi Kataoka / Kingo Tatsuno
- Developer: Cabinet Railway Authority

Other information
- Number of rooms: 129
- Number of suites: 3
- Number of restaurants: 4

Website
- www.narahotel.co.jp

Nara Hotel (奈良ホテル) is a five star hotel in Nara, Japan. The hotel is located on the hillside overlooking Nara Park. Opened on October 17, 1909, it is one of the most historic hotels in Japan. It was designed by Tatsuno Kingo who was also the designer of the Bank of Japan building and the Marunouchi building of Tokyo Station and is known as the teacher of Kenkichi Yabashi, the designer of National Diet Building, and Kataoka Yasushi who was also the designer of Osaka City Hall. It is partially owned by the West Japan Railway Company. In 2009 the first centennial anniversary of the hotel was celebrated.

== History of the site ==
The hill on which the hotel stands is called Kionzan (鬼薗山). In the Muromachi period it formed part of the precinct of Daijō-in, one of the two monzeki of Kōfuku-ji. The garden of Zenjō-in, where the abbots of Daijō-in resided, lay at the southern foot of the hill and survives as the Former Daijō-in Garden.

From 1444 to 1458 the hill was occupied by Kionzan Castle (鬼薗山城). It was built during a struggle for leadership among the armed clergy of Kōfuku-ji, in which the Tsutsui clan opposed the Furuichi clan. The Furuichi side, backed by the Daijō-in abbot Kyōgaku, completed the castle in 1444. In 1445 its defenders set it on fire and withdrew, after which the Tsutsui side held it and faced the Furuichi, whose base lay to the south at Furuichi Castle. Once the two factions were reconciled in 1458, the buildings were removed and the moats were filled in.

In 1999 the Nara City Board of Education excavated the western end of the hill ahead of an apartment construction. The survey found stepped kuruwa (enclosures) on the summit, a trench cutting across the ridge, artificial scarps 6–8 m high on the northern and western slopes, and part of a moat 6 m wide and 1.7 m deep, with pottery of the 15th–16th centuries. The southern slope facing the Obanadani River had been left largely unaltered, which the report attributes to the castle having been built to guard against the neighbouring sub-temples to the north and west.

== Famous guests ==
Various crowned and uncrowned heads of state, members of royal families, heads of government, politicians, actors, artists, and other notable persons have stayed at the hotel.

- Emperor Taishō and Empress Teimei, with Crown Prince Hirohito, in 1916
- Kyoshi Takahama, Japanese poet, in 1916
- Sergei Prokofiev, Russian composer, on May 19–27, 1918
- Count Nogi Maresuke, Japanese general, in 1911
- Crown Prince Hirohito, in 1921
- Bertrand Russell, British mathematician, on July 19, 1921
- Edward, Prince of Wales, in 1922
- Albert Einstein, Swiss physicist, on December 17–18, 1922
- Emperor Shōwa and Empress Kōjun, in 1928
- Prince Henry, Duke of Gloucester, in 1929
- Charles Lindbergh, American aviator, in 1931
- Emperor Shōwa, in 1932 and 1940
- Emperor Puyi, in 1935. He gave medals to all the staff of the hotel.
- Charlie Chaplin, in 1936
- Empress Kōjun, in 1937 and 1941, 1954
- Helen Keller, American social welfare entrepreneur, in 1937
- José P. Laurel, former Philippine President, in 1945 for two months
- Richard Nixon, U.S. vice-president, in 1953
- Joe DiMaggio, 1954, Marilyn Monroe canceled her reservation
- Marlon Brando, American actor, in 1956
- Glenn Ford, American actor, in 1956
- Jawaharlal Nehru, Indian prime minister, and his daughter Indira Gandhi, in 1957
- Princess Alexandra of Kent, in 1961
- John Diefenbaker, Canadian prime minister, in 1961
- Arturo Frondizi, Argentine president, in 1961
- Robert F. Kennedy, U.S. Attorney General, in 1962
- Princess Margrethe, The Hereditary Princess of Denmark, in 1963
- Prince Takamatsu, in 1964
- King Baudouin of Belgium, in 1964
- Premier Georges Pompidou of France, in 1964
- Prince of Laos, in 1965
- Prince of Spain, in 1966
- Prince Chichibu, in 1967
- Prince of Nepal, in 1967
- Crown Prince Naruhito, in 1968
- Gaston Eyskens, Belgian prime minister, in 1969
- Emperor Showa and Empress Kojun, in 1970
- Prince Takamatsu and Princess Takamatsu, in 1970
- Queen Beatrix of the Netherlands, in 1970
- Princess Margaret, Countess of Snowdon, in 1970
- Pope Paul VI, in 1970
- Prince Fumihito, in 1970
- Emperor Showa and Empress Kojun, in 1979 and 1981
- Yul Brynner, in 1980
- Audrey Hepburn, British actress, March 31-April 2, 1983
- Crown Prince Akihito and Crown Princess Michiko, with daughter Princess Sayako, in 1987
- Prince Akishino and Princess Akishino, in 1990
- Václav Havel, Czechoslovak president, in 1992
- Prince Edward, Duke of Kent, in 1992
- Emperor Heisei and Empress Michiko, in 2002 and 2008
- 14th Dalai Lama, Tibetan spiritual head, in 2003
- Hu Jintao, Chinese president, in 2008

== Gallery ==
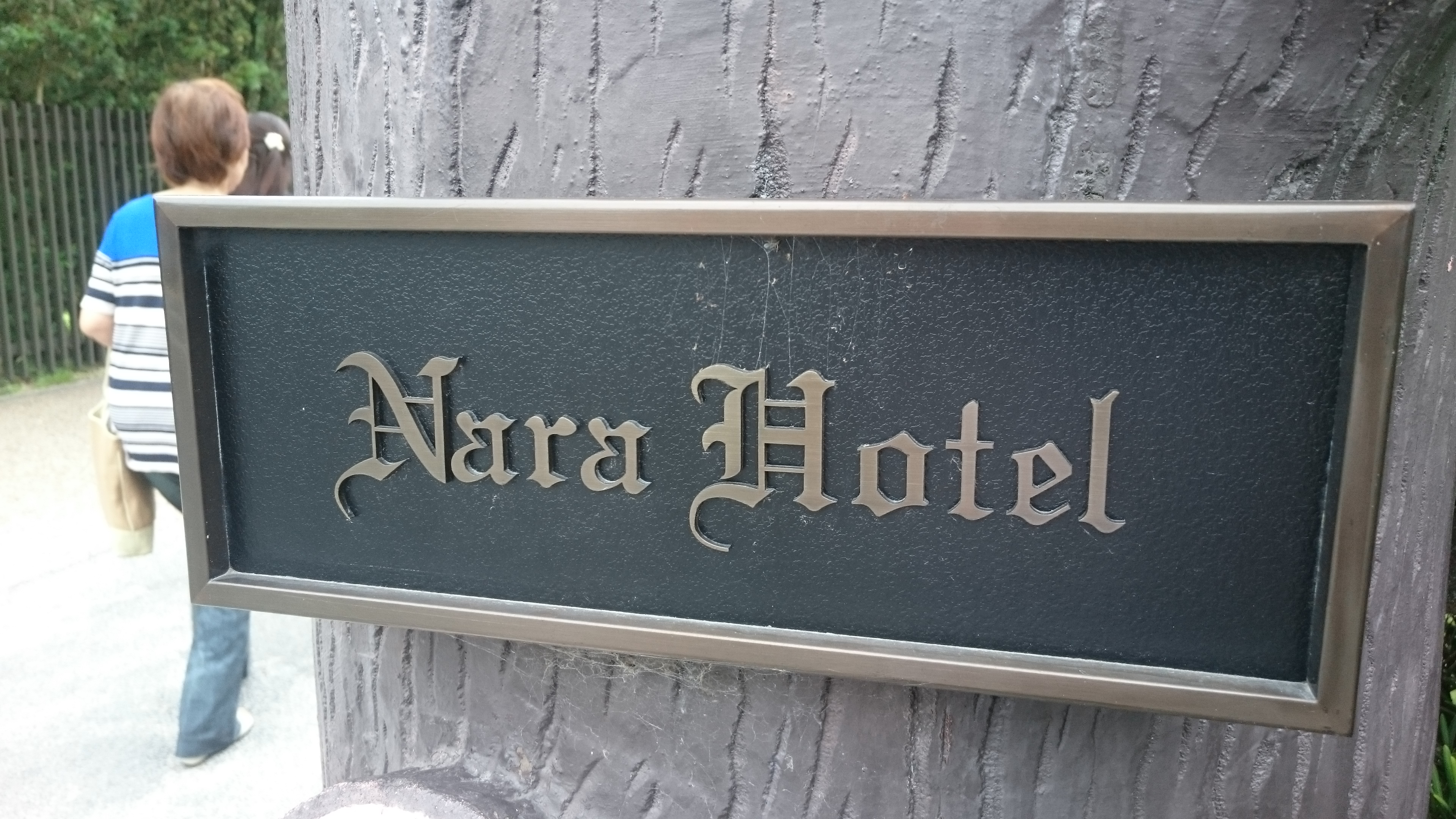
Nara Hotel signboard

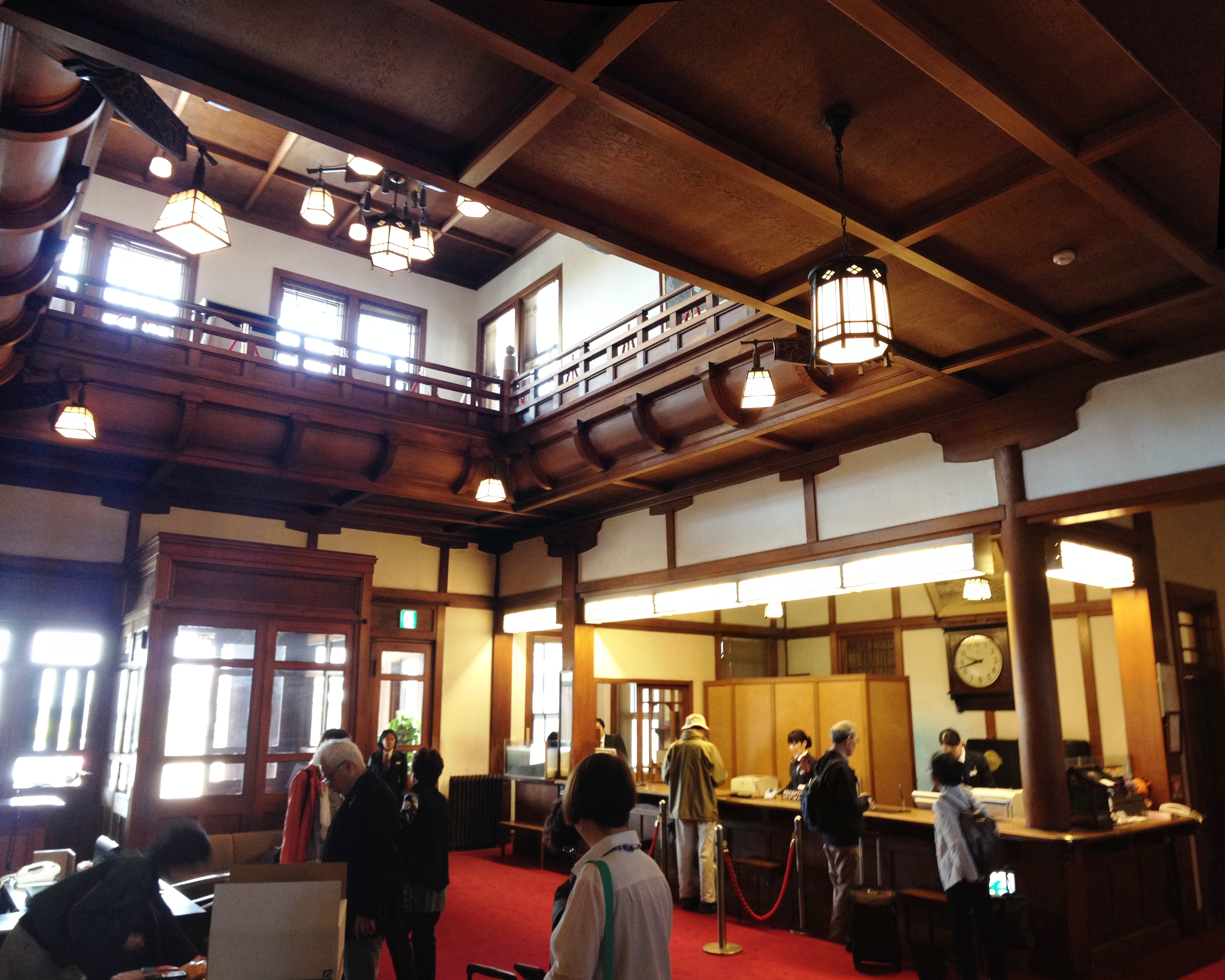
Lobby

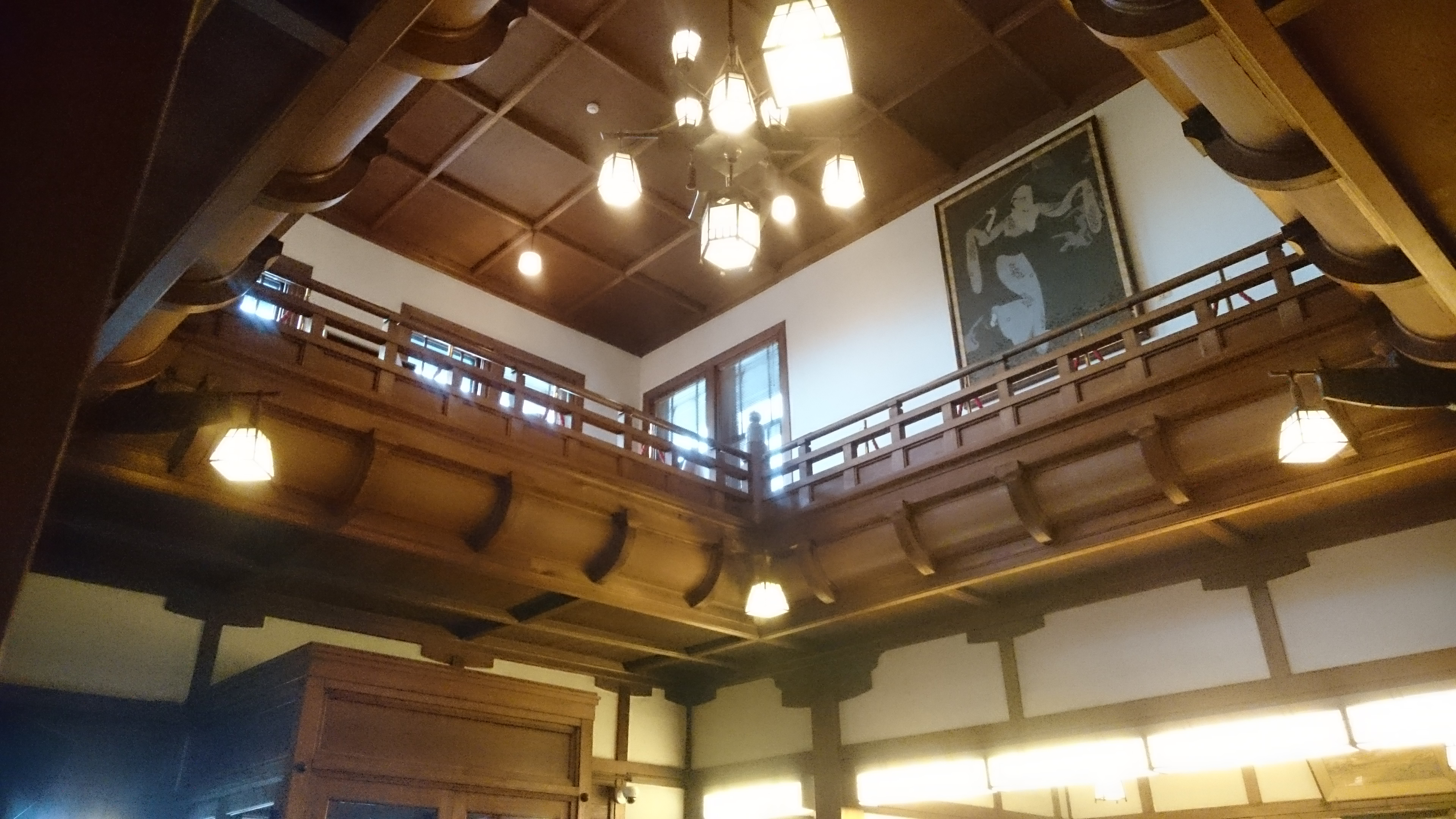

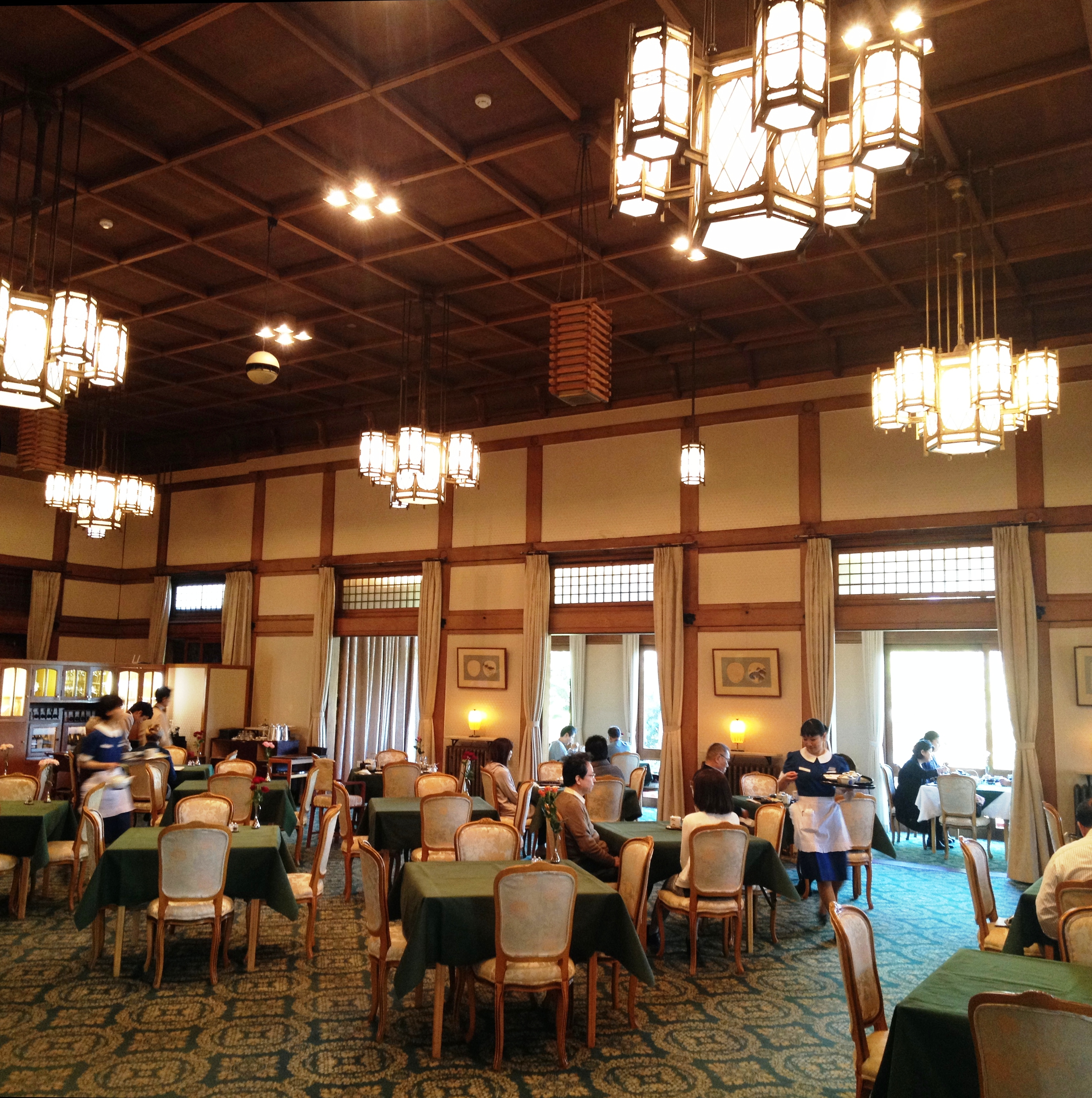
Mikasa dining room

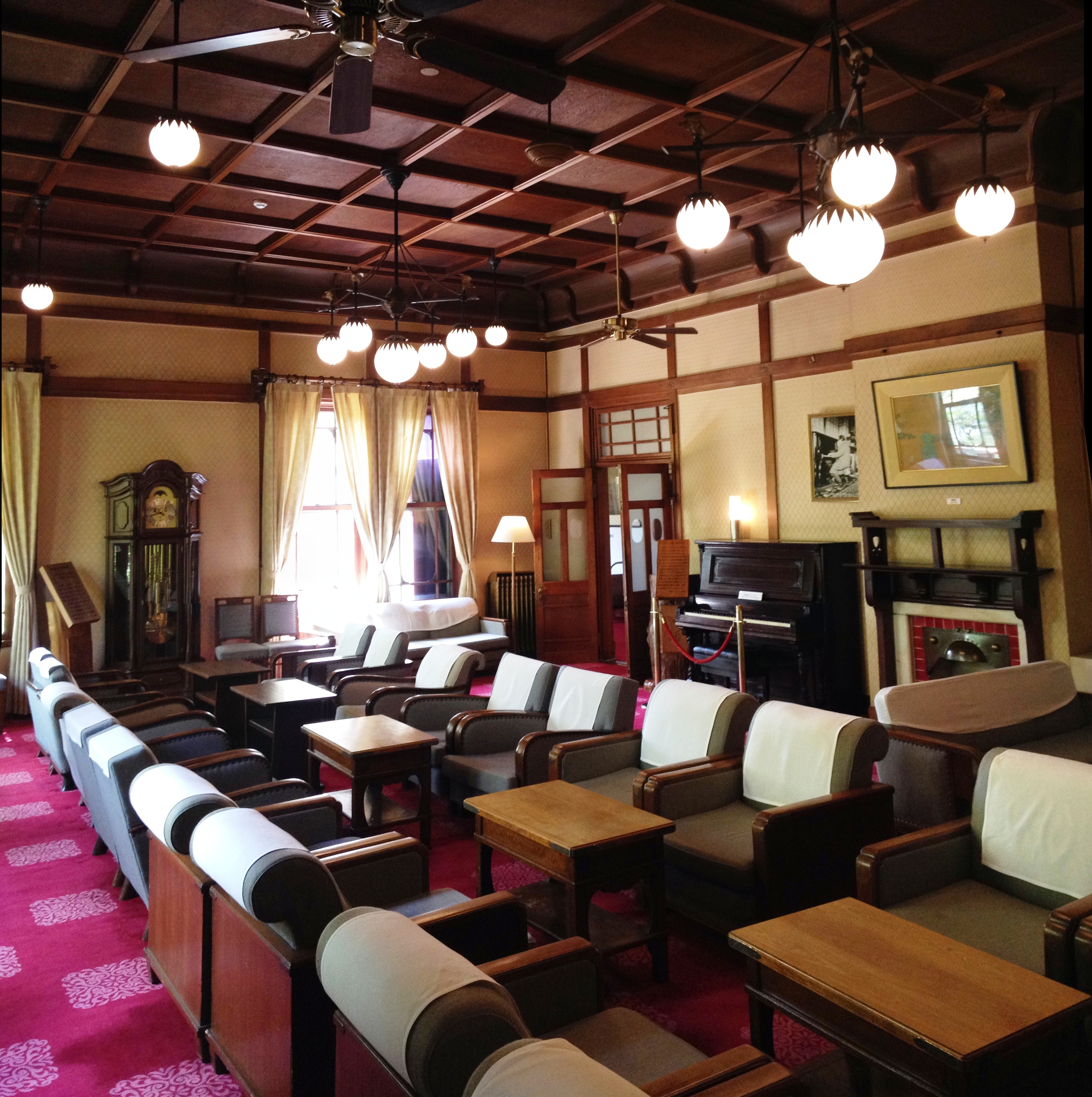
Tea lounge with the piano that Einstein played on

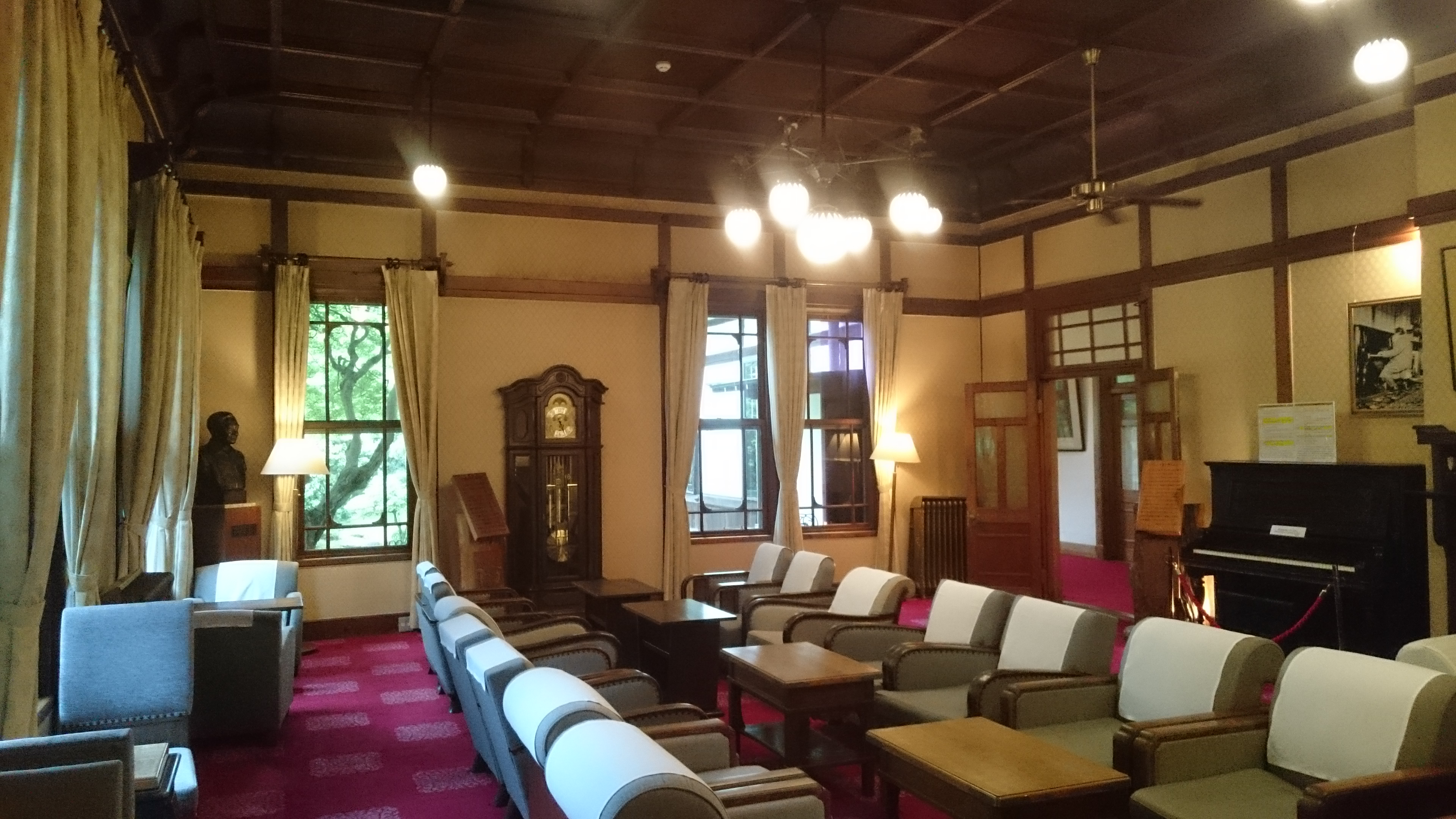

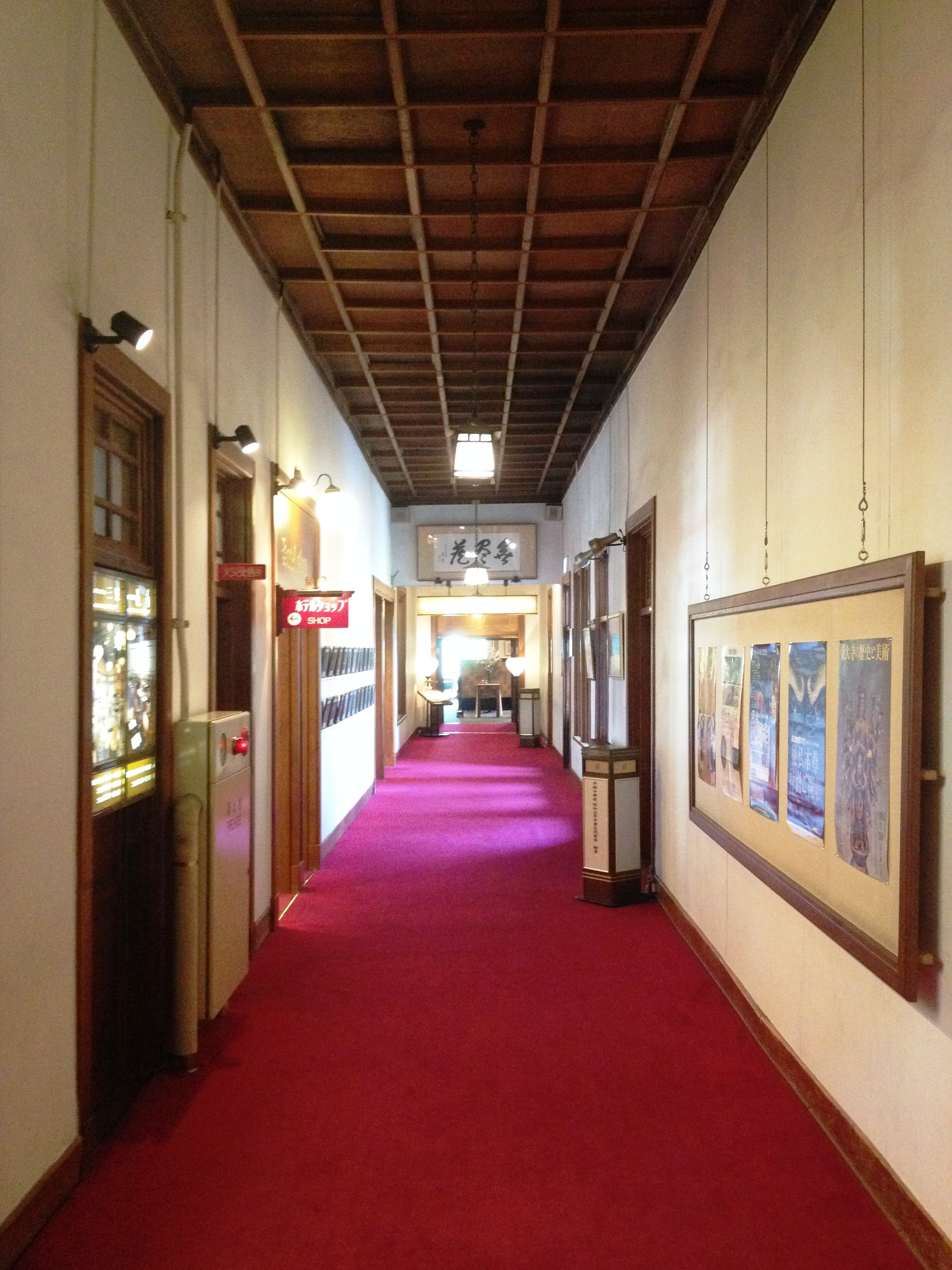
Hallway on the first floor

== See also ==
- Fujiya Hotel
- Nikkō Kanaya Hotel
- Nagoya Hotel
- Imperial Hotel, Tokyo
- Hōshi Ryokan
- Dōgo Onsen
