= Nagoya Kanko Hotel =

Coordinates: 35.16885°N 136.895472°E

- 名古屋観光ホテル
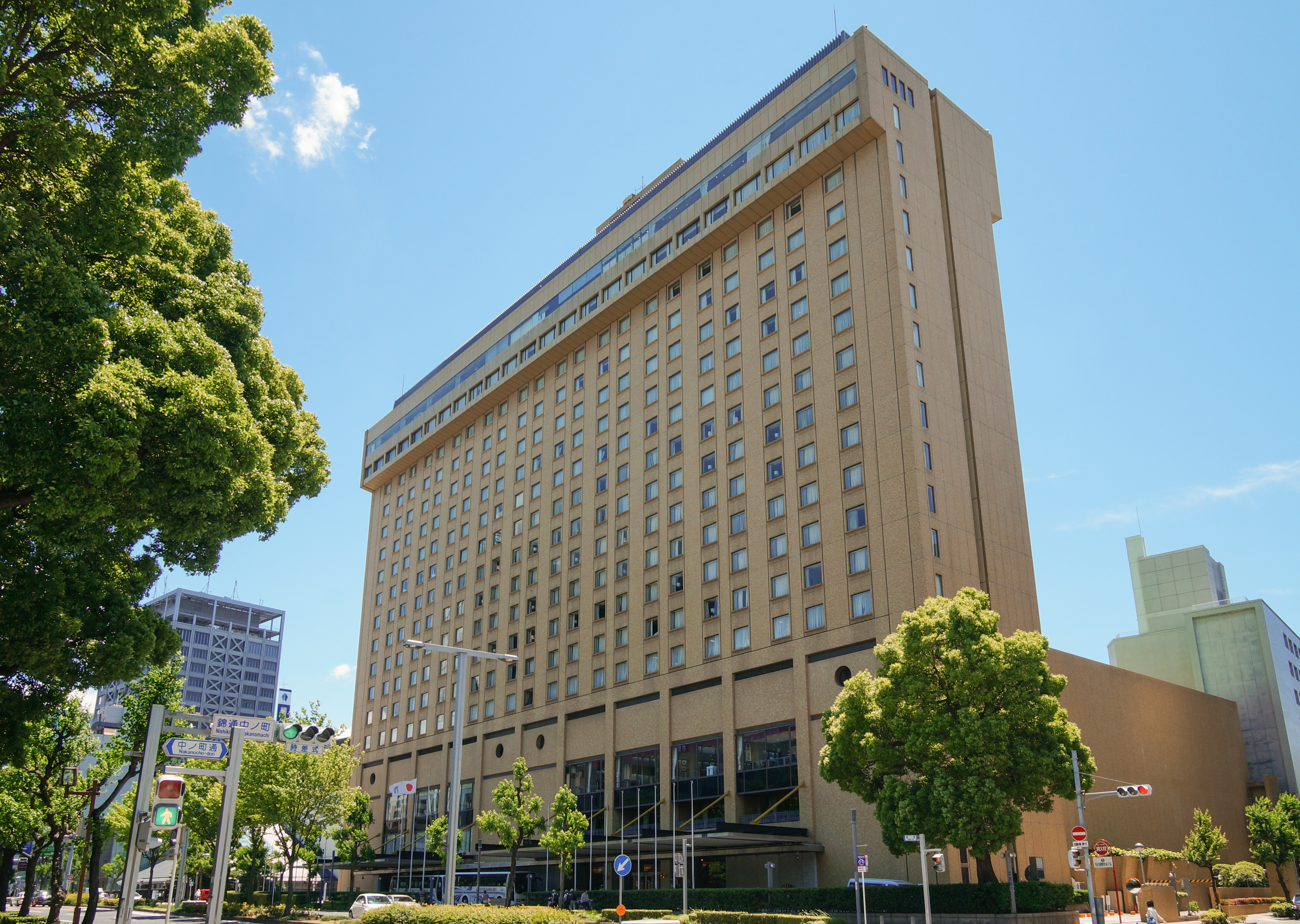

General information
- Location: Nagoya
- Country: Japan
- Year(s) built: 1934
- Opened: December 16, 1936

Technical details
- Floor area: 47,422 m²

Other information
- Parking: 250

The Nagoya Kanko Hotel (名古屋観光ホテル) is one of the oldest city hotels in Nagoya, central Japan. It is owned by the Kowa Company. The hotel is located in the prestigious area near the Hirokoji-Fushimi intersection, Nagoya's old commercial centre.

== History ==
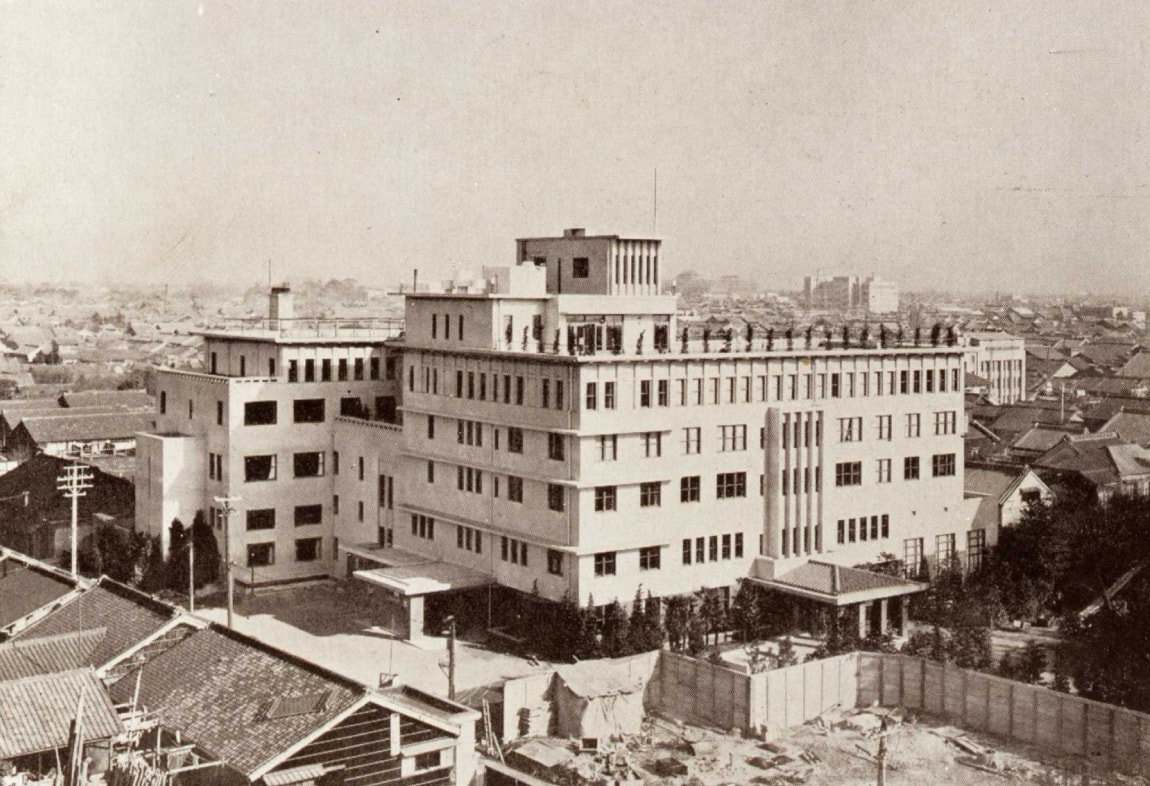
The hotel in the 1930's

In 1928, the hotel was proposed by Itō Jirozaemon, the president of the Rotary Club of Nagoya, and the Nagoya Chamber of Commerce and Industry and other investors started the hotel construction plan and opened on December 16, 1936. The original building had five floors above ground with a basement floor, and a total of 70 rooms. Jirozaemon was also the owner of the Itō zaibatsu company that owned Itō Bank (now MUFG Bank) with Matsuzakaya at its core.

The Nagoya Pan-Pacific Peace Exposition took place from March 15 to May 31, 1937, welcoming many domestic and international guests. The hotel was damaged in the bombing of Nagoya in World War II on March 19, 1945. It also housed surrounding residents struck by disaster.

Business resumed two months later. In 1970 the old building was demolished and the new structure built and opened on December 23, 1972. With 81.5 metres height it became the highest hotel in town.

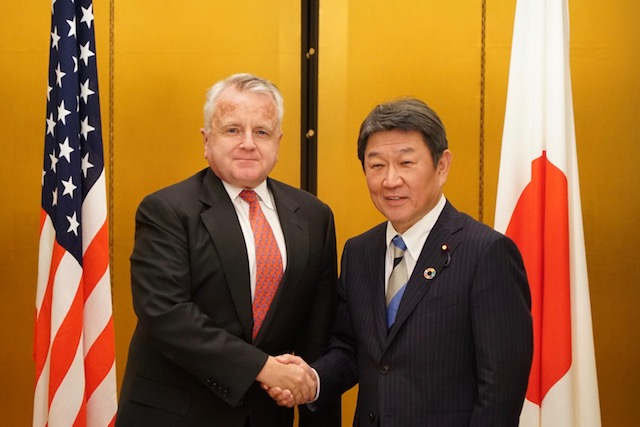
Japanese Foreign Minister Motegi Toshimitsu meeting U.S. Deputy Secretary of State John Sullivan at the G20 Foreign Ministers' Meeting at the hotel on November 23, 2019

In the post-war era it is traditionally the place where members of the Japanese imperial family stay when they visit the city, as well as visiting heads of state such as French president Jacques Chirac in 2000 and the King of the Belgians in 2016. The G20 Aichi-Nagoya Foreign Ministers' Meeting was held here in November 2019.

== See also ==
- Nagoya Hotel
- Kawabun
