= Kawabun =

Oldest ryōtei in Nagoya

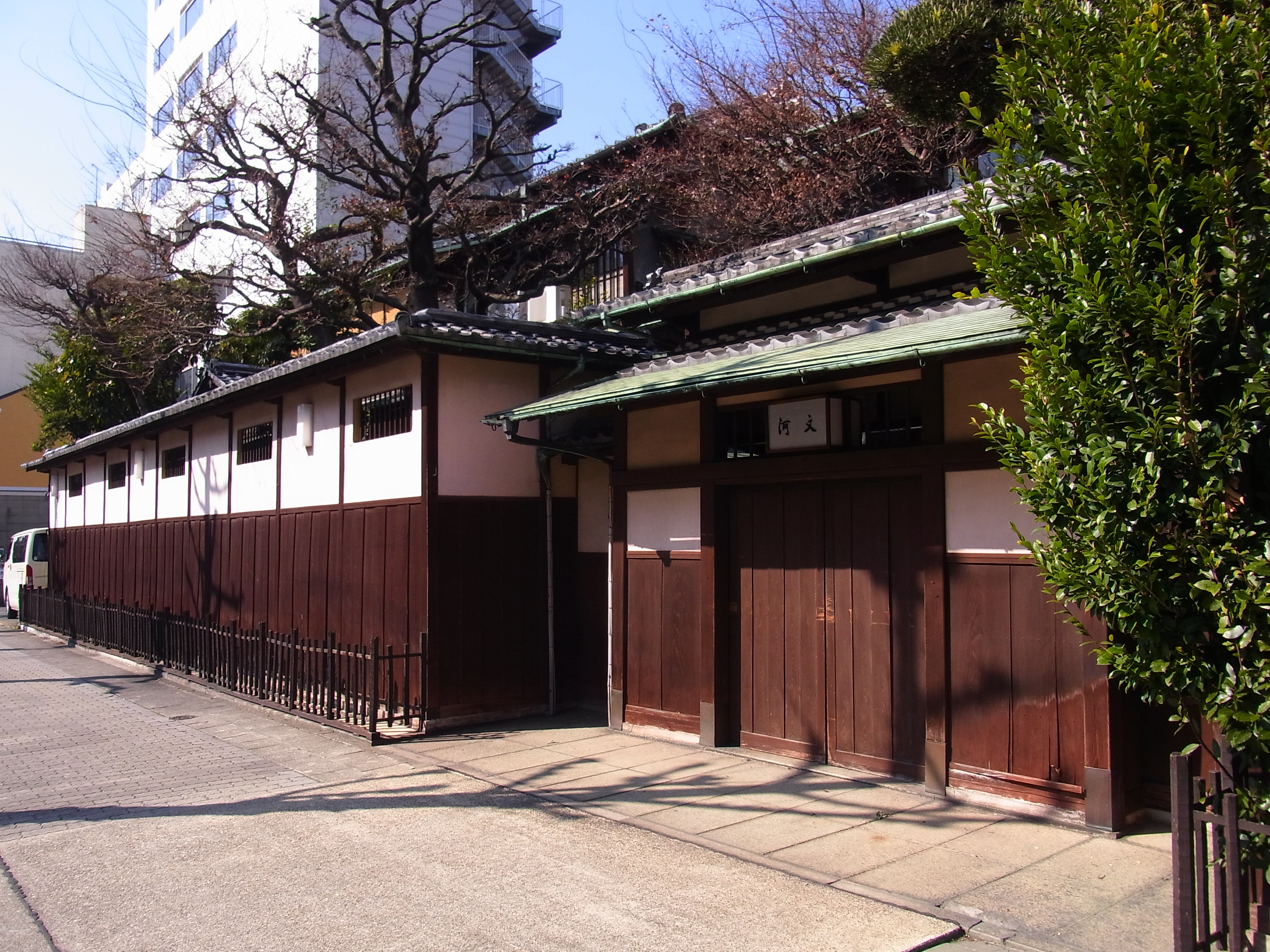
Main gate of the Kawabun

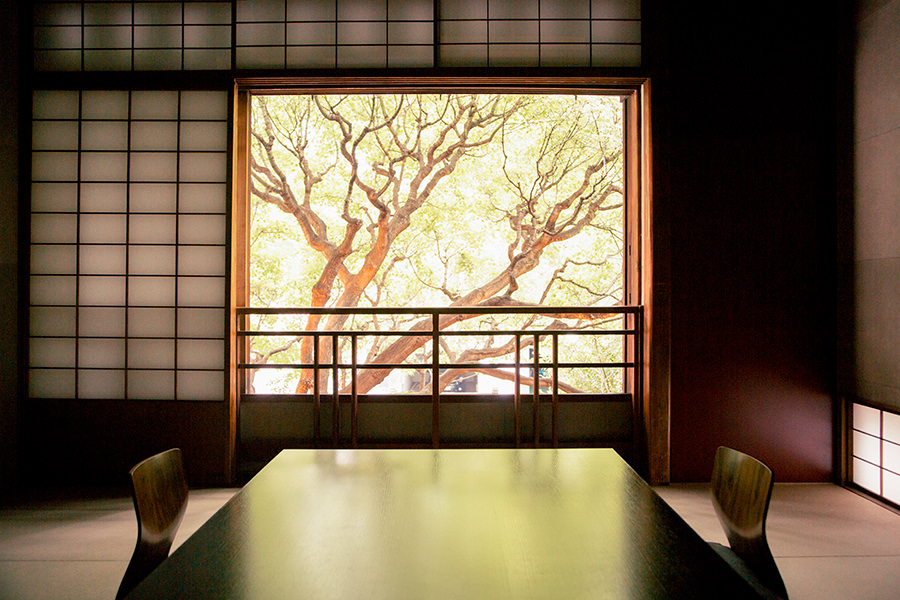
The Momiji room, the only tatami room in the restaurant with a horigotatsu—sunken seating with a garden view.

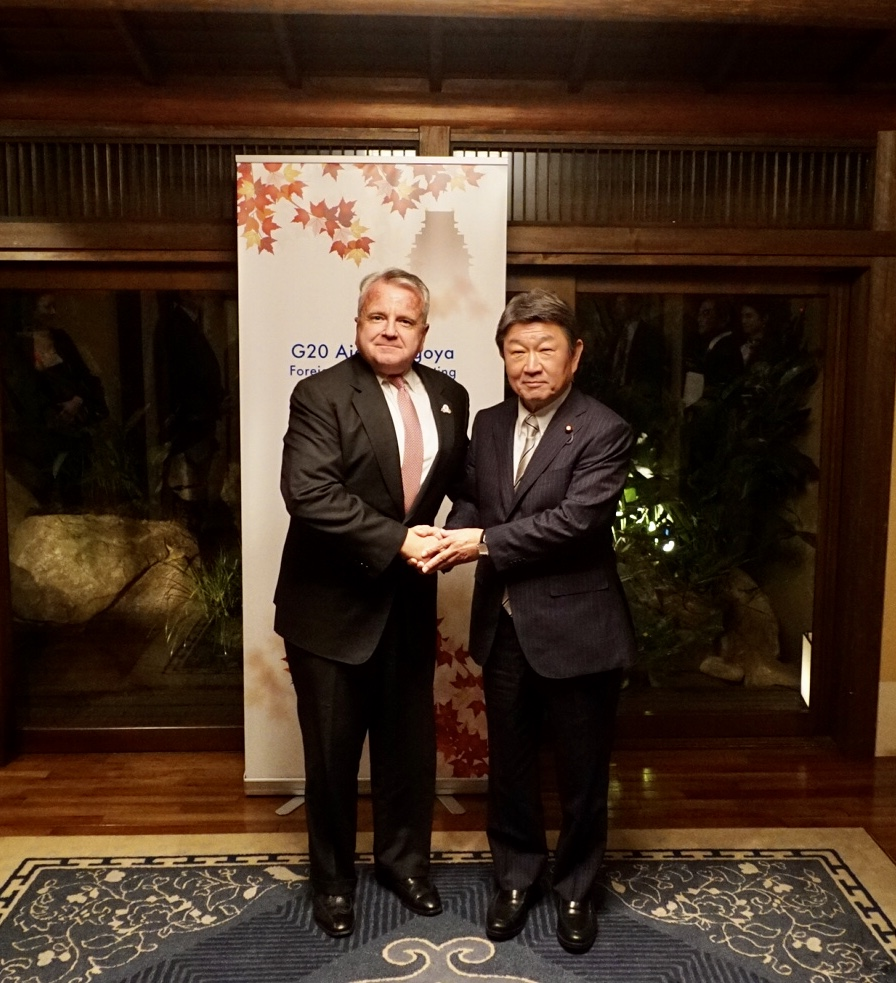
Japanese Foreign Minister Motegi Toshimitsu welcoming U.S. Deputy Secretary of State John Sullivan at the Kawabun during the G20 summit in November 2019

The Kawabun (河文) is Nagoya's oldest ryōtei (traditional restaurant), located in Marunouchi 2-chome, Naka-ku, Nagoya.

== History ==
Founded during the Edo period (1603–1867), the Kawabun became a successful business that was patronised by the Owari Tokugawa rulers. In the Meiji period (1867–1911), successive politicians such as Ito Hirobumi also visited. The Kawabun was established as a company in October 1912. It was heavily damaged during the bombing of Nagoya in World War II, and was rebuilt after the end of the war. The Kawabun served as host for a dinner in November 2019 for the foreign ministers of the G20 Aichi-Nagoya Foreign Ministers' Meeting.

The ryōtei specialises in serving kaiseki.

== Buildings ==
In 2005, the main building, front gate, wall, wakimon gate, shinyotei, corridor, yoryotei, and kitchen were registered by the authorities as Registered Tangible Cultural Properties.

The Mizugami-no-Naka room was designed by Yoshirō Taniguchi in 1973.

The tsubo garden was created by the 10th generation Matsuo-ryu iemoto Matsuo Sogo (Fusensai).

== See also ==
- Nagoya Kanko Hotel
