= Nagoya Hotel =

Historic hotel in Nagoya, Japan

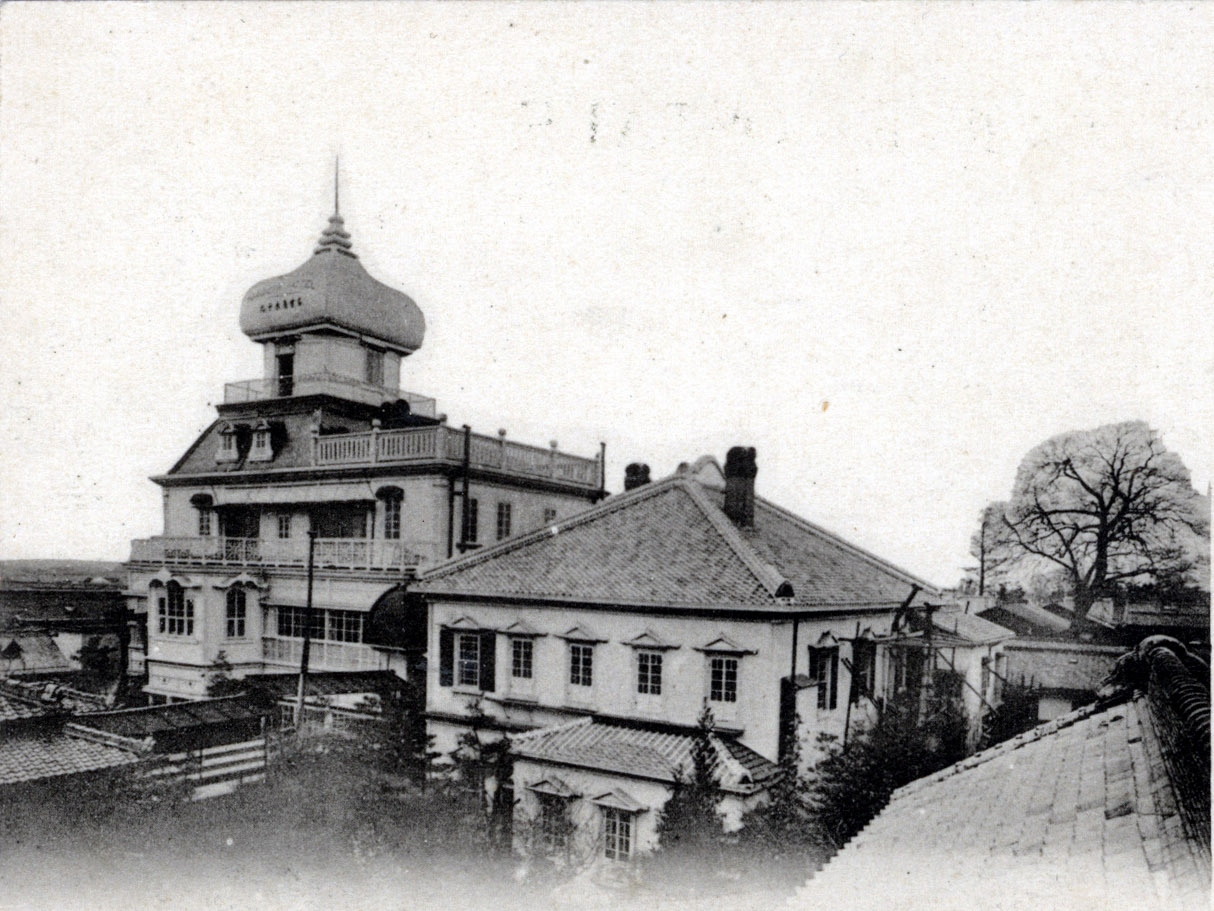
Nagoya Hotel c. 1900 with its landmark dome

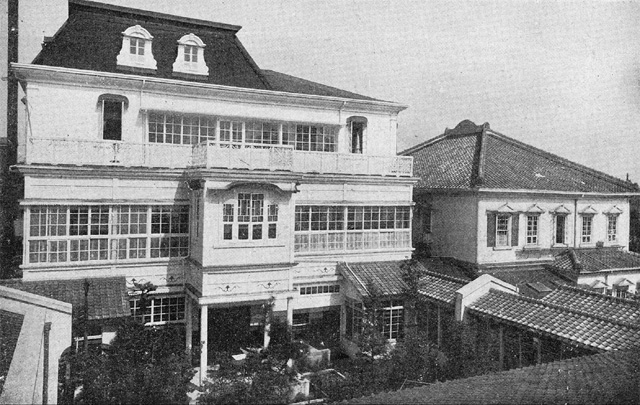
Nagoya Hotel in a later time, without dome

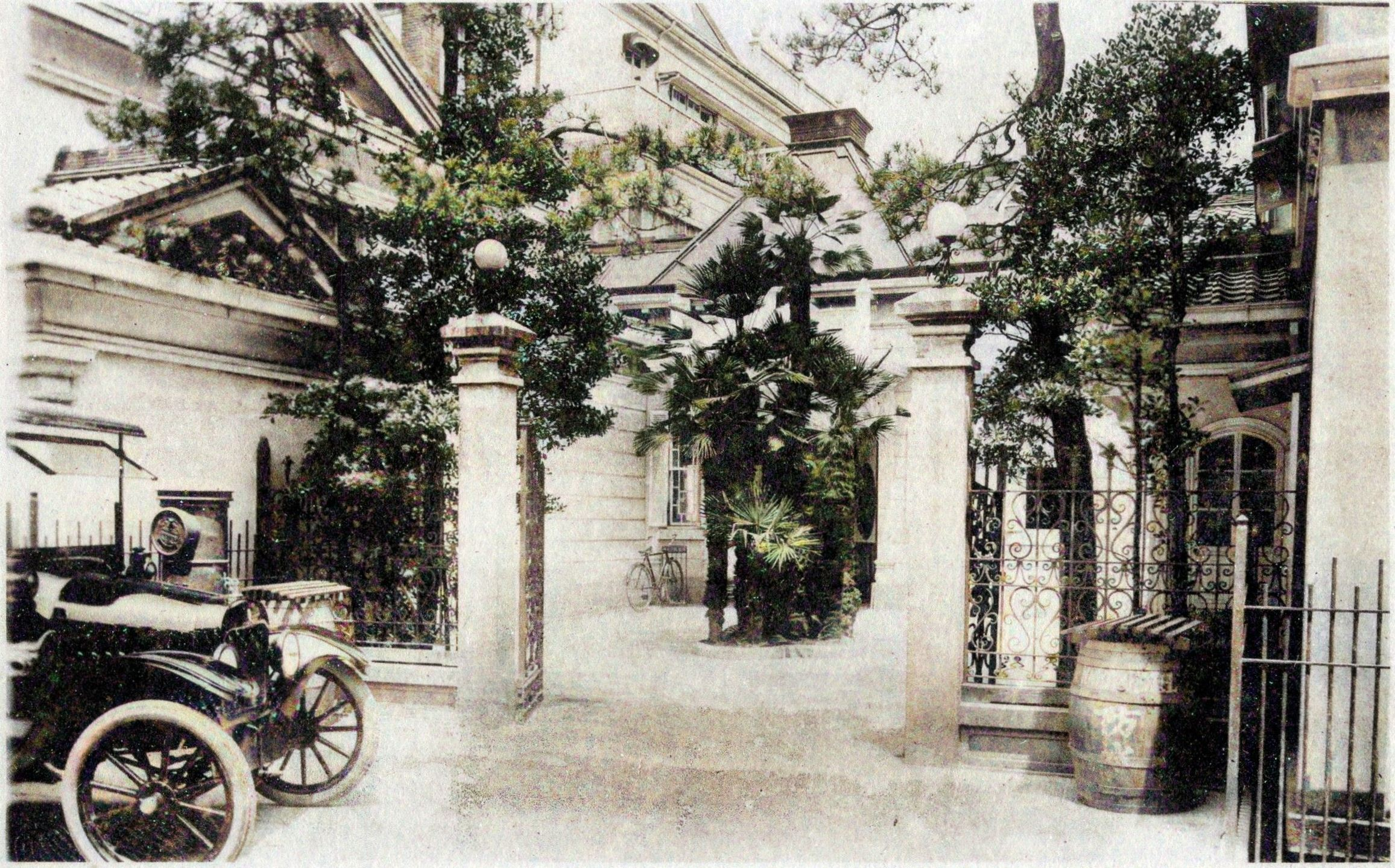
Street entrance, c. 1920s

Nagoya Hotel (名古屋ホテル) was a historic hotel in Tatemitsukura-chō (竪三ツ蔵町), Naka-ku, Nagoya, Japan.

== History ==
It was constructed in 1888 out of wood in a Western style. It offered Japanese rooms as well as Western-style rooms. The proprietor in 1901 was T. Takata. The proprietor was by trade a carpenter who designed the dining room in maple and hinoki, as well as reading rooms, smoking rooms and card rooms. On the exterior the hotel had a large dome-shaped roof that could be seen above the rest of the surrounding buildings.

Prince Arthur of Connaught stayed here during his first visit to Japan in end of February, 1906.

The plot today is occupied by modern buildings.

== See also ==
- Nagoya Kanko Hotel
- Fujiya Hotel
- Nikkō Kanaya Hotel
- Nara Hotel
- Imperial Hotel, Tokyo
- Hōshi Ryokan
- Dōgo Onsen
