= Nikkō Kanaya Hotel =

Coordinates: 36.7520827°N 139.6040332°E

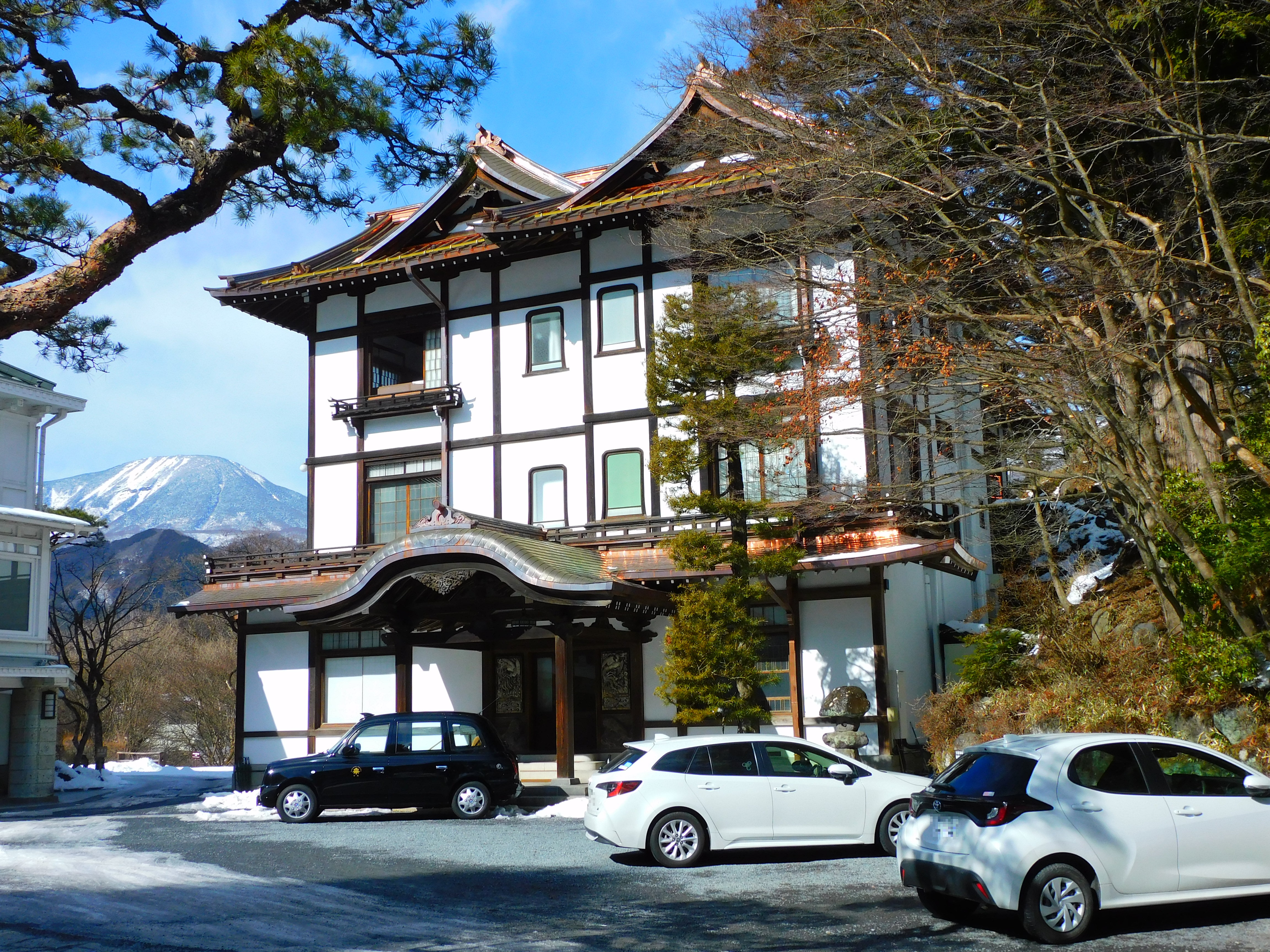
- Annex
- Interactive map of the Nikkō Kanaya Hotel area

General information
- Location: Nikkō, Tochigi, Japan
- Opening: June, 1873

Website
- www.kanayahotel.co.jp/en/nkh

The Nikkō Kanaya Hotel (日光金谷ホテル) is a historic hotel in Nikkō, Japan. It is the oldest Western-style resort hotel in Japan opened in 1873.

It is not affiliated with the Nikko Hotels chain.

== History ==
In 1871, Kanaya Zenichirō, a shō player at Nikkō Tōshō-gū, offered to let James Curtis Hepburn, who had no place to stay, stay at his house. Visitors from abroad who had heard Hepburn's stories began to come to the Kanaya family. In June 1873, at the suggestion of Hepburn, who visited with his wife, Kanaya renovated his home into an inn and opened the hotel.

In 1893, the family constructed a grand hotel (current Main Building) on 14 acres adjacent to Nikkō Tōshō-gū. New Building was constructed in 1901, and Annex in 1935. The hotel consists of different sections constructed in a mixture of traditional Japanese and western architecture.

Notable guests have included Harry Parkes in 1874, Émile Guimet in 1876, Edward S. Morse in 1877, Isabella Bird in 1878, Ulysses S. Grant in 1879, Samuel Rawson Gardiner in 1882, Thomas Blake Glover in 1885, Ernest Fenollosa in 1887, William Sturgis Bigelow in 1887, Walter Weston in 1888, Alfred East in 1889, Basil Hall Chamberlain in 1904, Erwin Bälz in 1904, Frank Lloyd Wright in 1905, Prince Arthur in 1906, Natsume Sōseki in 1912, Edward VIII in 1921, Dr. Albert Einstein in 1922, Prince George in 1926, Prince Henry in 1928, Werner Heisenberg in 1929, Paul Dirac in 1929, Charles Lindbergh in 1931, Charlie Chaplin in 1932, Helen Keller in 1937, Dwight D. Eisenhower in 1946, Hirohito in 1957, Indira Gandhi in 1957, Mikhail Sholokhov in 1965, Akihito in 1967, and Anne, Princess Royal in 1983.

In 1945, the hotel was requisitioned by SCAP and operated as a special service hotel for military vacations until February 1952.

In 2016, the Tobu Railway Company acquired 60% of the hotel's shares making it part of the Tobu Group.

== History House ==
Kanaya Hotel History House, which still exists in almost the same condition as when it was founded in 1873, is located 1.3 km west of Nikkō Kanaya Hotel. The house was once home to samurai during the Edo period, and was known to visitors from abroad as the "Samurai House".

== Gallery ==
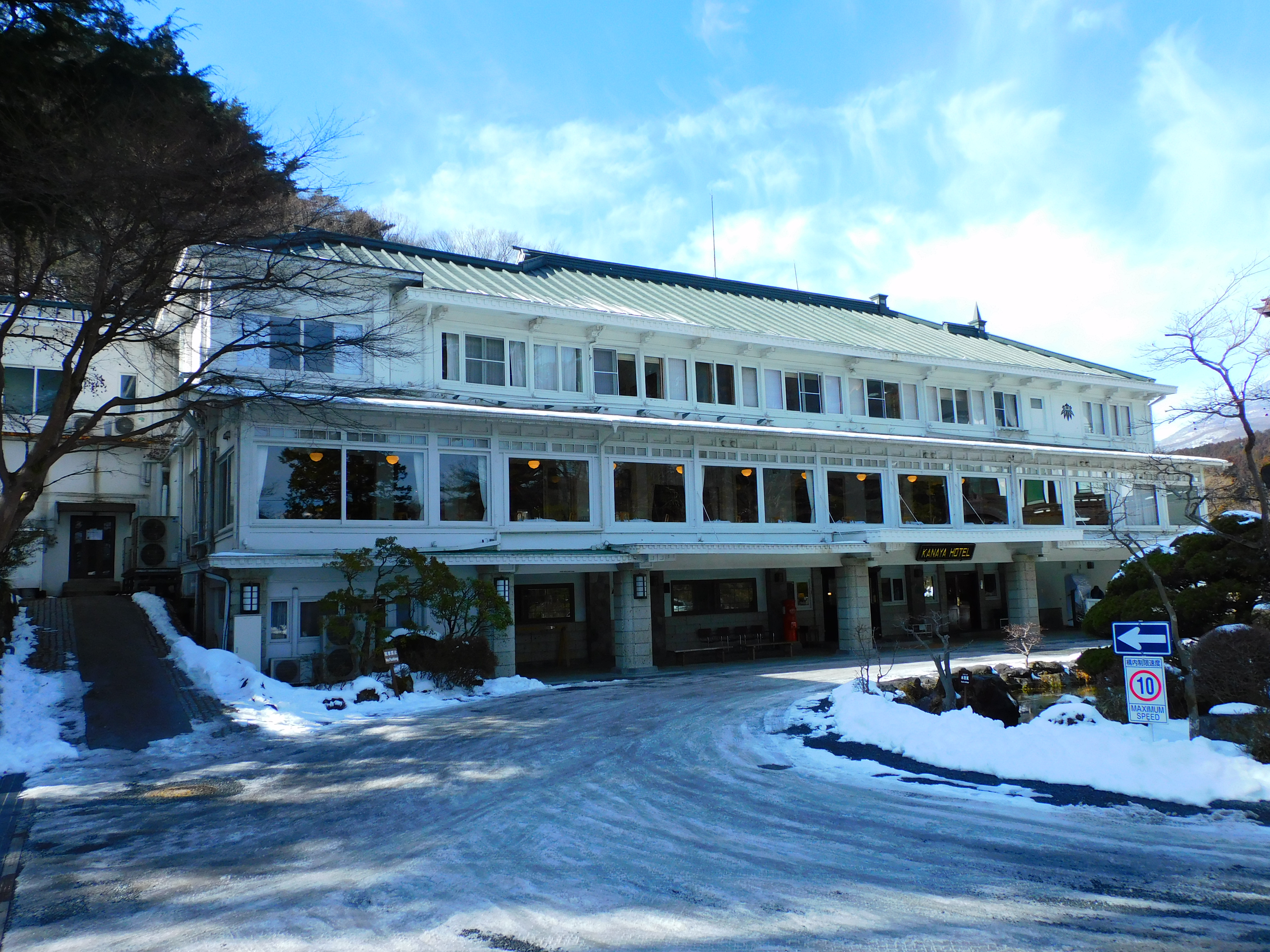
Main Building

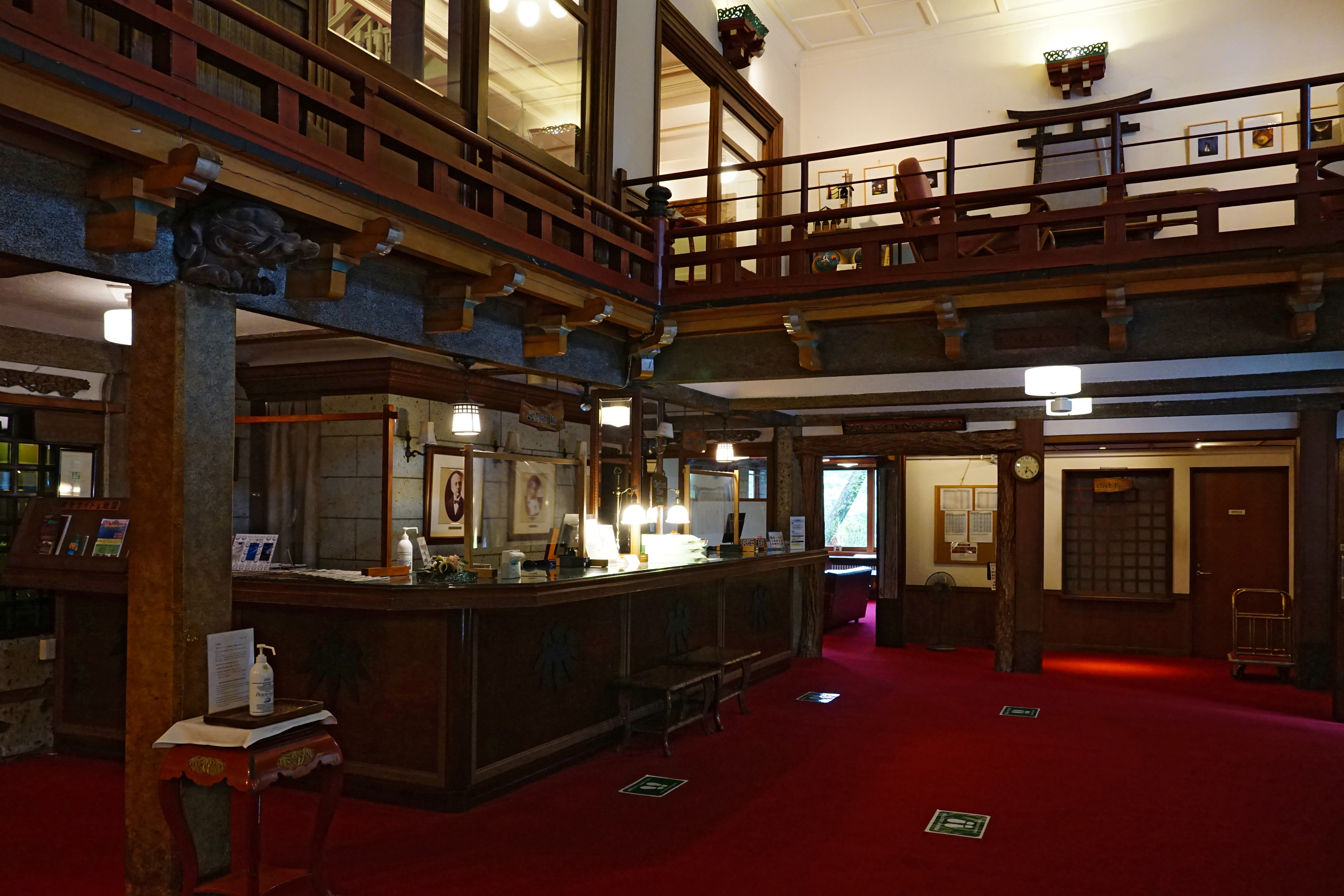
front desk

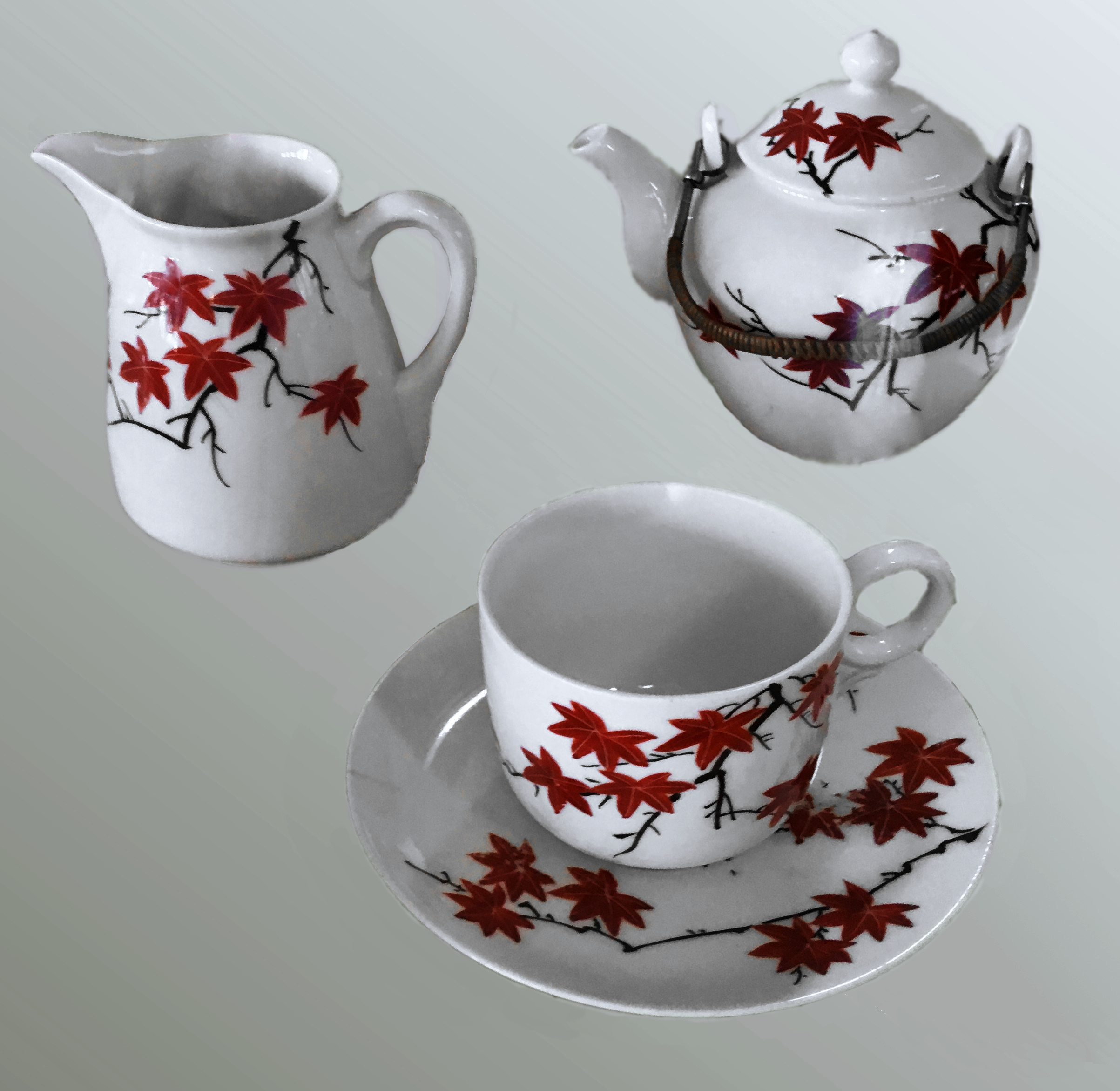
Coffee pot and cups in red maple leaves design was used at the time of opening

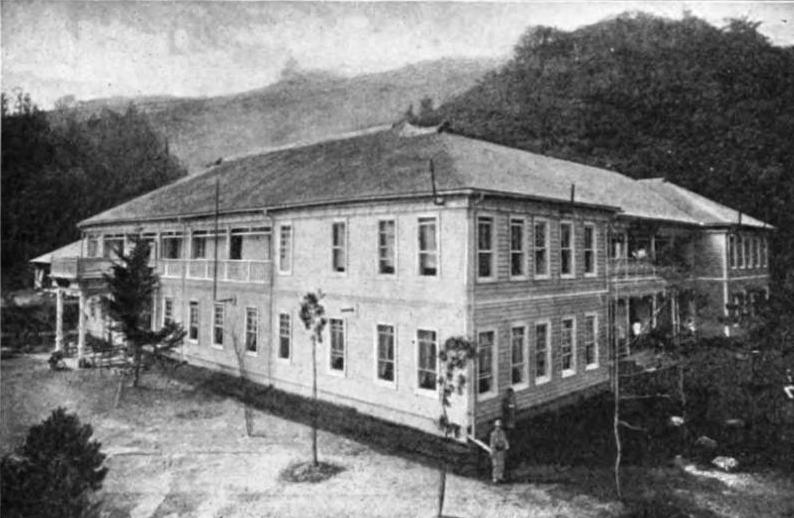
Kanaya Hotel, circa 1900

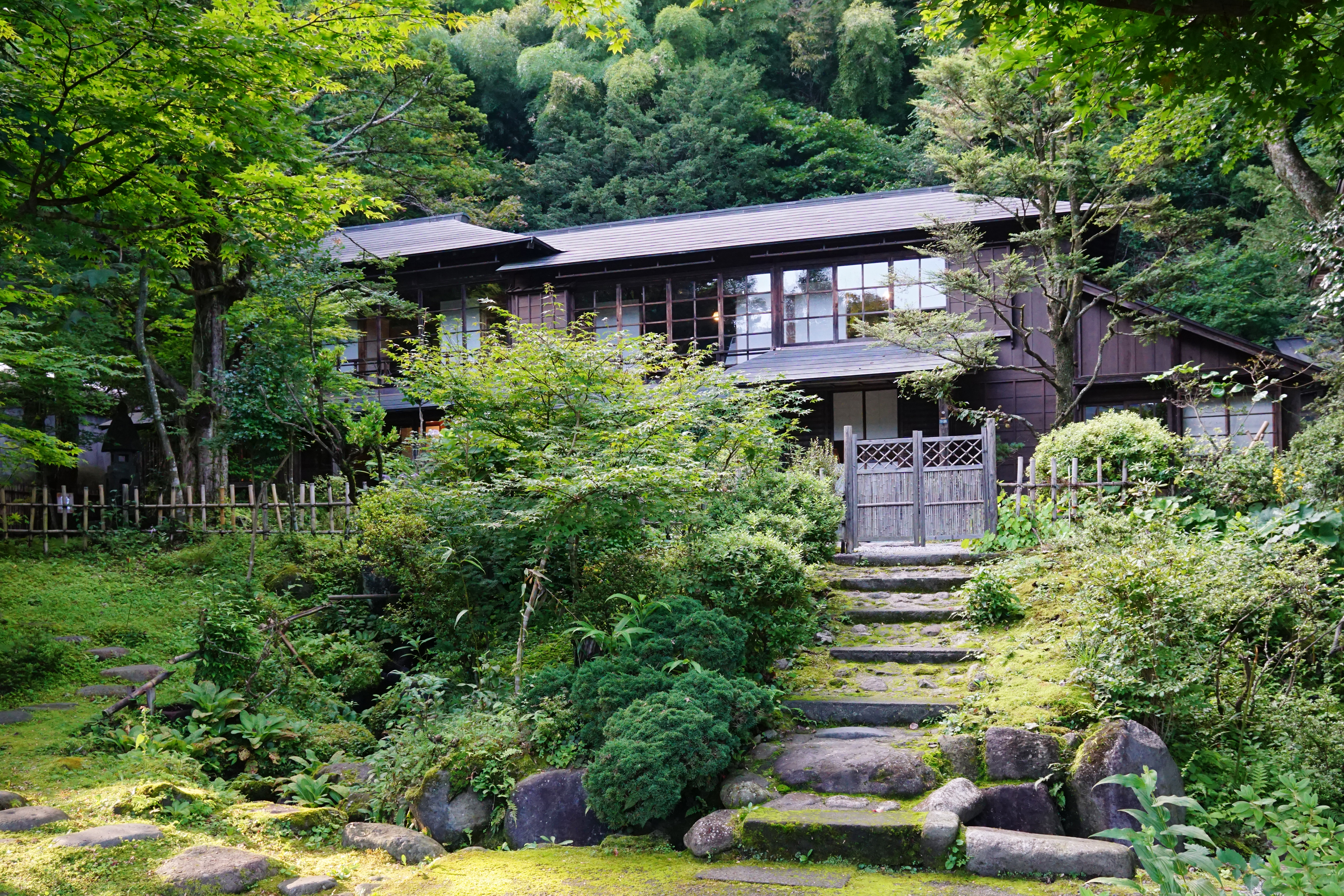
Kanaya Hotel History House

== See also ==
- Fujiya Hotel - In 1907, Kanaya Zenichirō's second son, Kanaya Shōzō, was adopted into the Yamaguchi family, the founding family of the Fujiya Hotel in Hakone, and became the second-generation manager.
- Nara Hotel
- Nagoya Hotel
