= Yasushi Kataoka =

Japanese architect

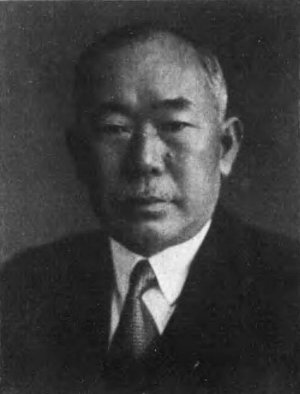
- Kataoka in 1935
- Born: 4 June 1876; Kanazawa, Ishikawa Prefecture
- Died: 26 May 1946 (aged 69); Osaka Prefecture, Japan
- Occupation: Architect

Yasushi Kataoka (片岡 安, Kataoka Yasushi) (4 June 1876 – 26 May 1946) was a Japanese architect, and a colleague of Kingo Tatsuno.
