= Nagoya City Science Museum =

Museum in Nagoya, Aichi, Japan

- 名古屋市科学館
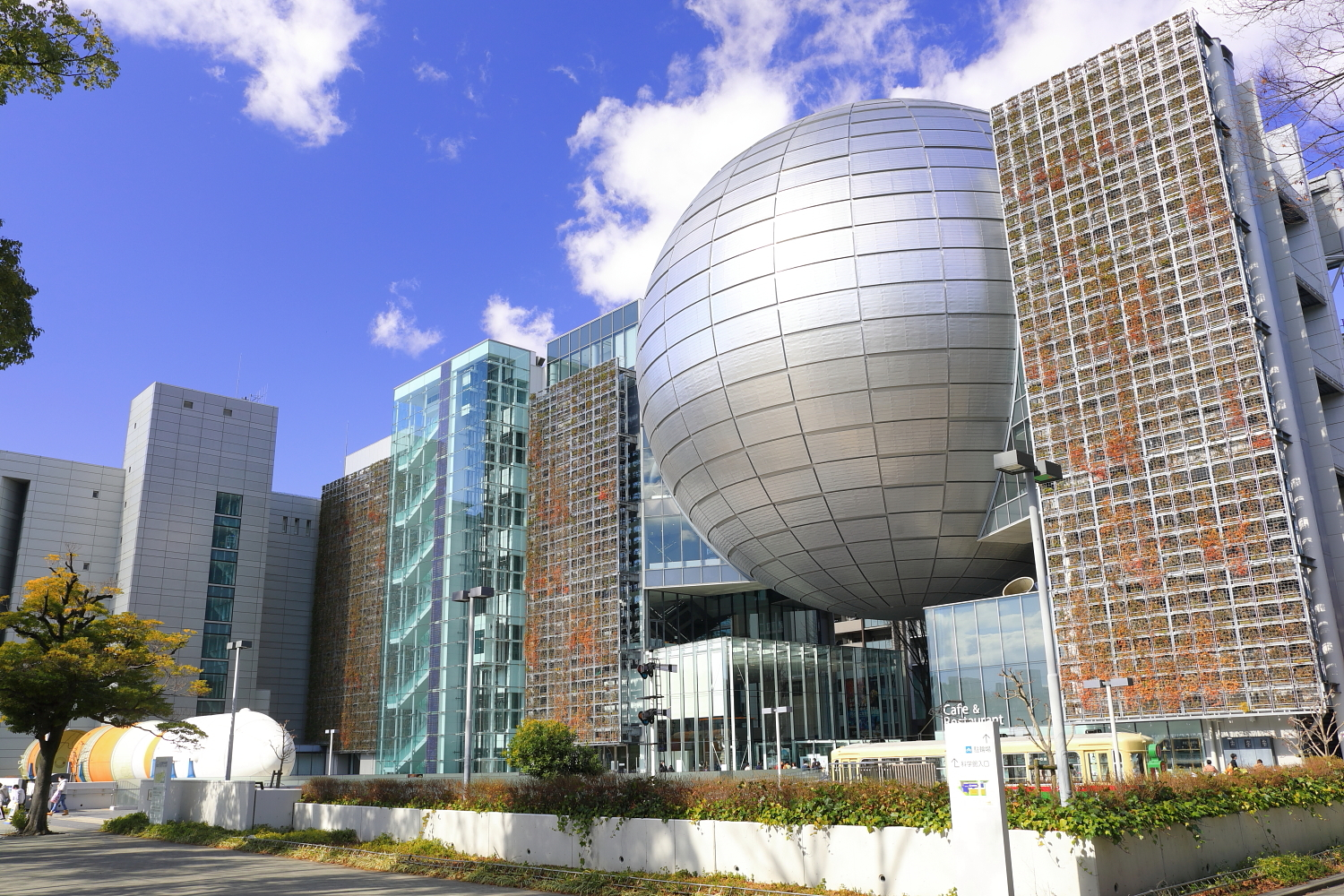
- Nagoya City Science Museum
- Location: Sakae, Nagoya, Japan
- Coordinates: 35°09′53.18″N 136°53′58.80″E
- Type: Science museum
- Website: Homepage of the Nagoya City Science Museum

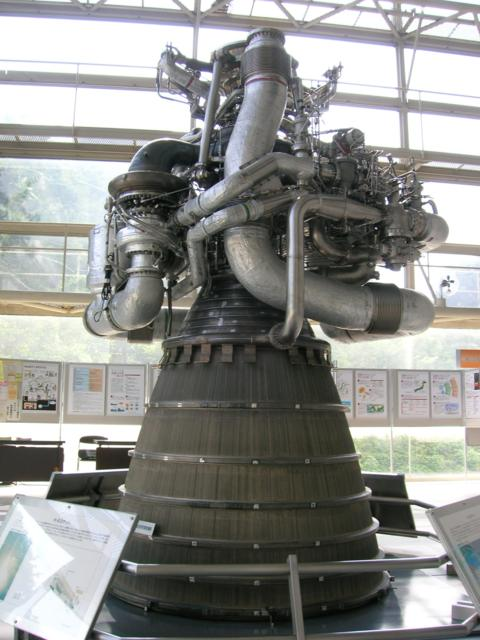
LE-7-Japanese liquid rocket engine in the Nagoya City Science Museum

The Nagoya City Science Museum (名古屋市科学館, Nagoya-shi Kagakukan) is a museum located in Sakae, Nagoya, the center of Nagoya City, in central Japan.

The museum houses one of the largest planetariums in the world and has three main sections on modern technology, life sciences and general science with a variety of hands-on exhibits. In 2012 much of the museum was renovated to coincide with the opening of the Planetarium. The upper floor of the museum is currently devoted to a display about space and future technology, utilizing touch-screen tablets and other technology. Many of the exhibits have been specifically tailored for children, such as a model railway on the third floor in the transport section.

The museum also has features on the local Chubu region's links to science and industry.

It is located in Shirakawa Koen along with Nagoya City Art Museum, midway between Osu Kannon and Fushimi subway stations, on Fushimi-Dori.
