= Electricity Museum, Nagoya =

Museum in Nagoya, Aichi, Japan

Coordinates: 35°08′20.05″N 136°53′24.35″E

Electricity Museum
- でんきの科学館
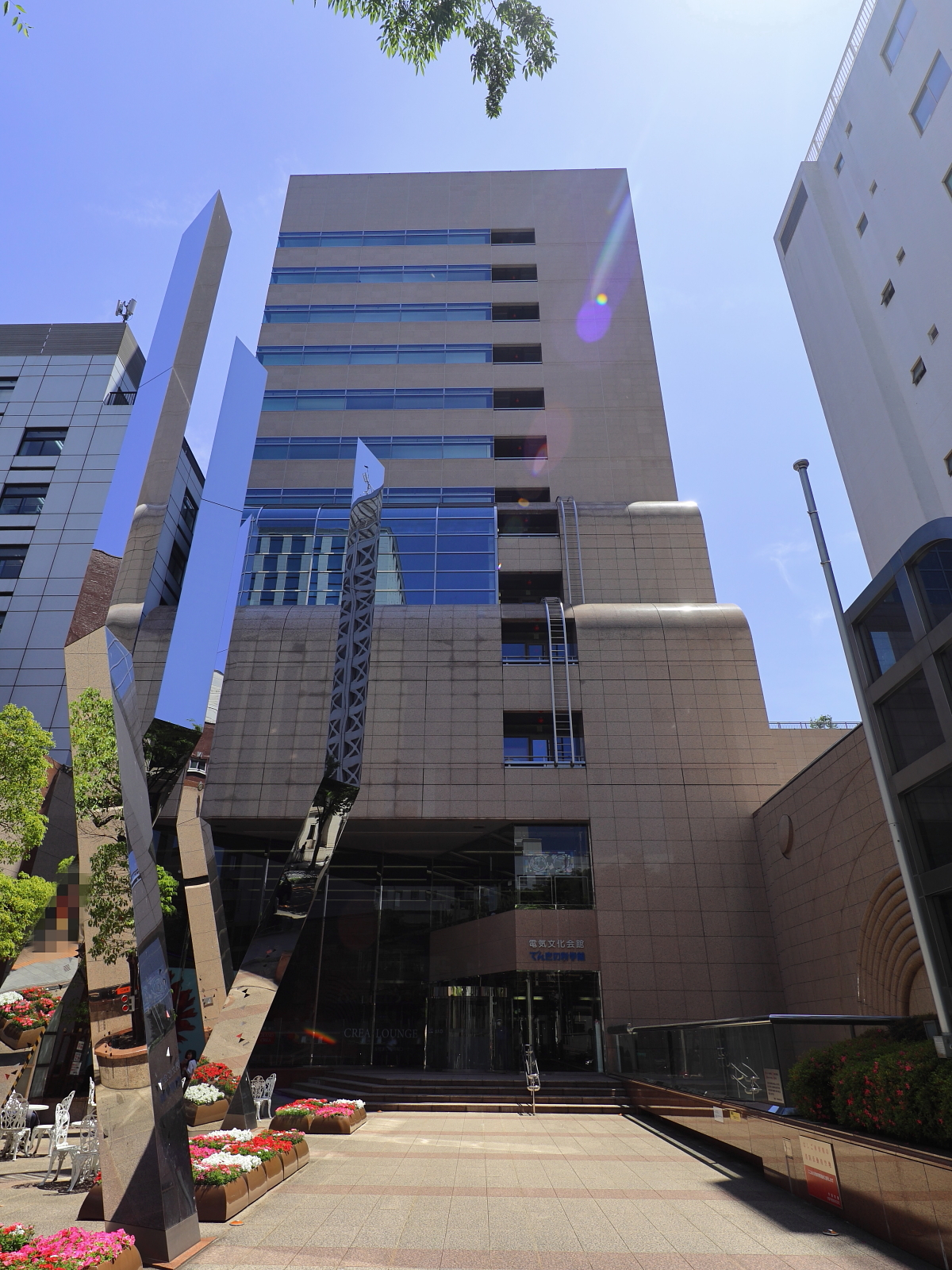
- Established: 1986
- Location: Nagoya, Aichi, Japan
- Type: Museum

The Electricity Museum (でんきの科学館, Denki no Kagakukan) is a technological museum and exhibition hall located in the city of Nagoya, Aichi Prefecture, Japan.

== History ==
The museum is sponsored by Chubu Electric Power and was opened in 1986.

== Exhibitions ==
The museum houses on the first four floors the history and development of electricity, and the usage of it throughout time until today. It also houses a concert hall and auditorium in the upper floors. Regular workshops for children are organised, where they can learn how to construct small, moveable toys, which are sponsored by companies such as Tamiya Corporation.

== See also ==
- List of museums in Japan
