= Aioiyama Station =

Metro station in Nagoya, Japan

S19 Aioiyama Station 相生山駅
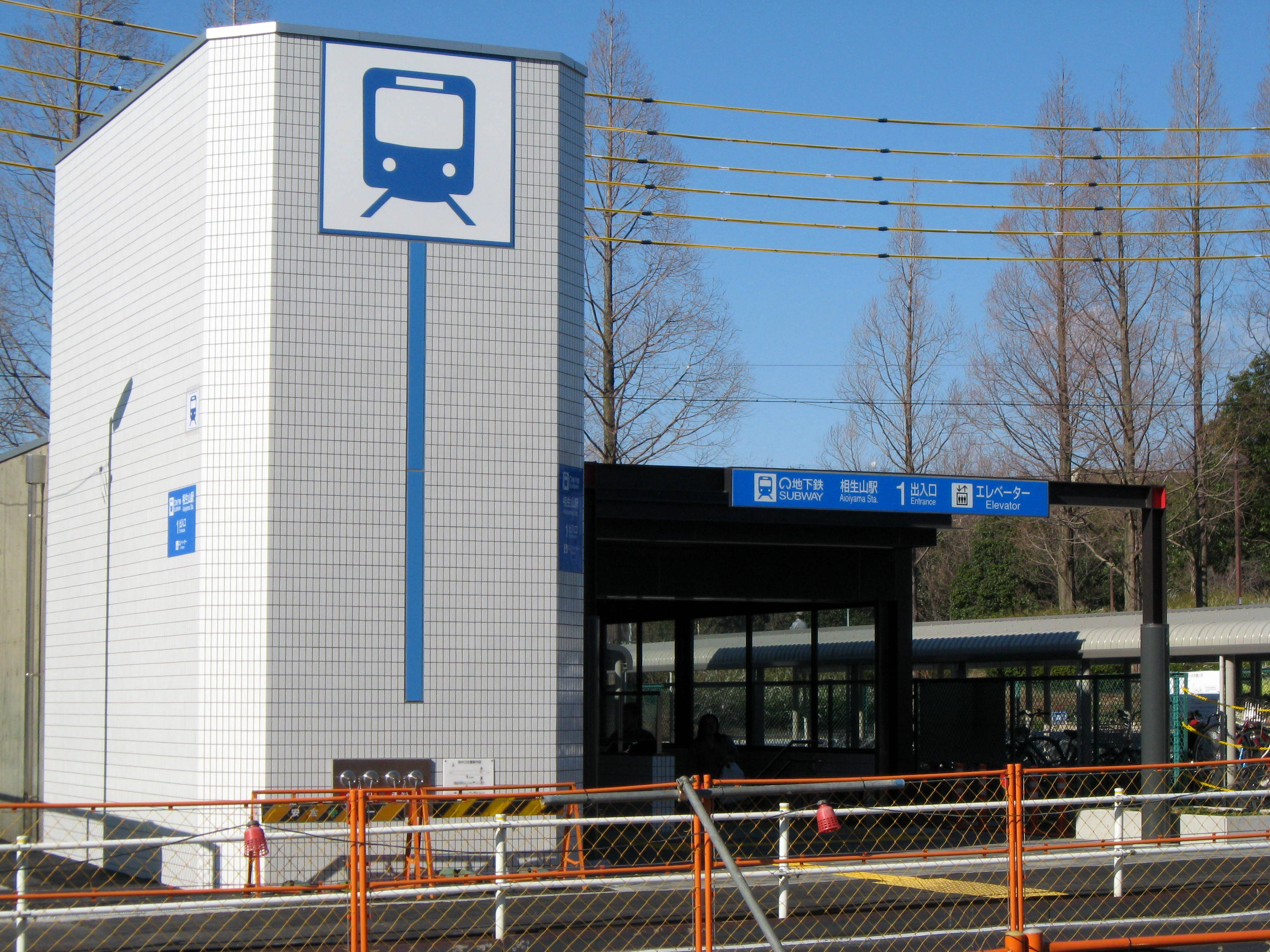

General information
- Location: 61, Aikawa 3-chōme, Midori, Nagoya, Aichi （名古屋市緑区相川3丁目61） Japan
- Coordinates: 35°06′09″N 136°58′34″E
- System: Nagoya Municipal Subway station
- Operator: Transportation Bureau City of Nagoya
- Line: Sakura-dōri Line
- Connections: Bus stop

Other information
- Station code: S19

History
- Opened: March 27, 2011; 15 years ago

Services
Preceding station	Nagoya Municipal Subway	Following station
Naruko Kita S18 towards Taiko-dori	Sakura-dōri Line	Kamisawa S20 towards Tokushige
Location

Aioiyama Station (相生山駅, Aioiyama-eki) is an underground metro station located in Midori-ku, Nagoya, Aichi, Japan operated by the Nagoya Municipal Subway’s Sakura-dōri Line. It is located 16.9 kilometers from the terminus of the Sakura-dōri Line at Taiko-dori Station.

== History ==
Kamisawa Station was opened on March 27, 2011 as part of the Sakura-dōri Line's extension to Tokushige.

== Lines ==
- Nagoya Municipal Subway
  - Sakura-dōri Line (Station number: S19)

== Layout ==
Aioiyama Station has a single underground island platform with Platform screen doors.

=== Platforms ===
1	■ Sakura-dōri Line	For Tokushige
2	■ Sakura-dōri Line	For Imaike, Nagoya, and Taiko-dori
