= Naruko Kita Station =

Metro station in Nagoya, Japan

Coordinates: 35°06′10″N 136°57′58″E

S18 Naruko Kita Station 鳴子北駅
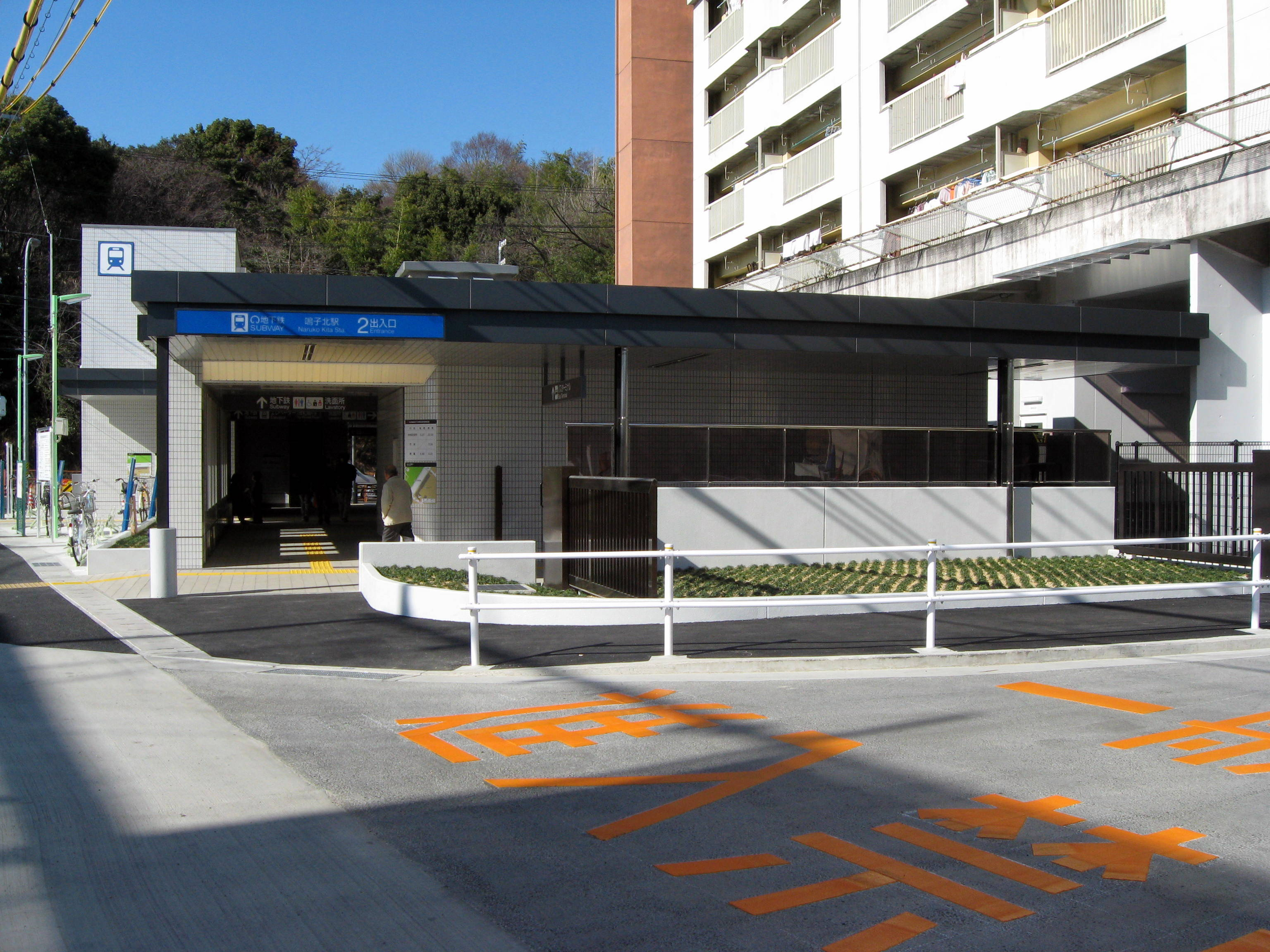

General information
- Location: 1-1 Aikawa, Tempaku, Nagoya, Aichi （名古屋市天白区相川1丁目1） Japan
- System: Nagoya Municipal Subway station
- Operator: Transportation Bureau City of Nagoya
- Line: Sakura-dōri Line

Other information
- Station code: S18

History
- Opened: 27 March 2011; 15 years ago

Services
Preceding station	Nagoya Municipal Subway	Following station
Nonami S17 towards Taiko-dori	Sakura-dōri Line	Aioiyama S19 towards Tokushige
Location

Naruko Kita Station (鳴子北駅, Naruko Kita-eki) is an underground metro station located in Tempaku-ku, Nagoya, Aichi Prefecture, Japan operated by the Nagoya Municipal Subway’s Sakura-dōri Line. It is located 16.0 kilometers from the terminus of the Sakura-dōri Line at Taiko-dori Station.

== History ==
Naruko Kita Station was opened on 27 March 2011 as part of the Sakura-dōri Line's extension to Tokushige.

== Lines ==
- Nagoya Municipal Subway
  - Sakura-dōri Line (Station number: S18)

== Layout ==
Naruko Kita Station has a single underground island platform with platform screen doors.

=== Platforms ===
1	■ Sakura-dōri Line	For Tokushige
2	■ Sakura-dōri Line	For Imaike, Nagoya, and Taiko-dori
