= Kamisawa Station (Nagoya) =

Metro station in Nagoya, Japan

S20 Kamisawa Station 神沢駅
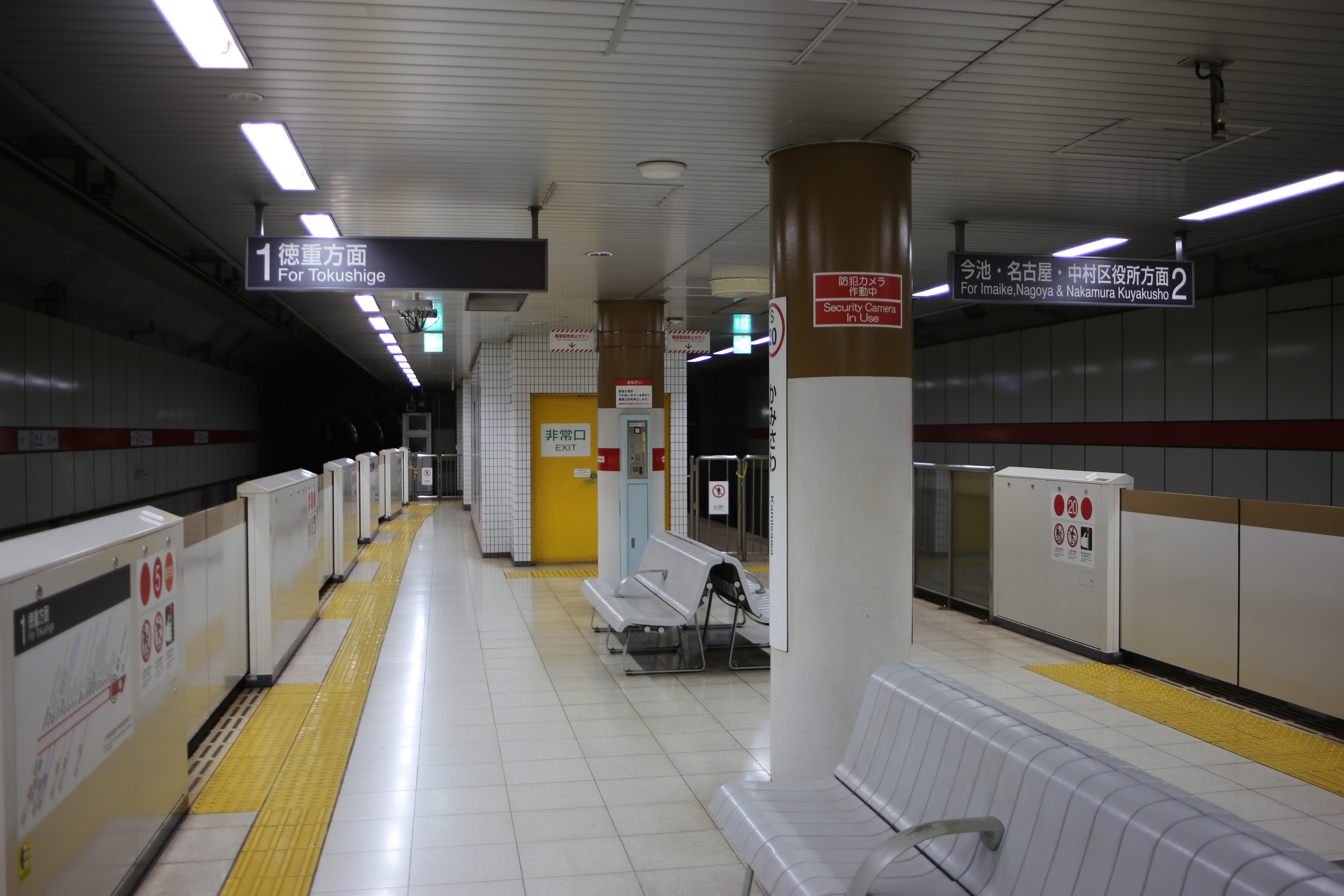

General information
- Location: 302, Kamisawa 1-chōme, Midori, Nagoya, Aichi （名古屋市緑区神沢1丁目303） Japan
- Coordinates: 35°05′55″N 136°59′22″E
- System: Nagoya Municipal Subway station
- Operator: Transportation Bureau City of Nagoya
- Line: Sakura-dōri Line
- Connections: Bus stop

Other information
- Station code: S20

History
- Opened: March 27, 2011; 15 years ago

Services
Preceding station	Nagoya Municipal Subway	Following station
Aioiyama S19 towards Taiko-dori	Sakura-dōri Line	Tokushige S21 Terminus
Location

Kamisawa Station (神沢駅, Kamisawa-eki) is an underground metro station located in Midori-ku, Nagoya, Aichi, Japan operated by the Nagoya Municipal Subway’s Sakura-dōri Line. It is located 18.3 kilometers from the terminus of the Sakura-dōri Line at Taiko-dori Station.

== History ==
Kamisawa Station was opened on March 27, 2011 as part of the Sakura-dōri Line's extension to Tokushige.

== Lines ==
- Nagoya Municipal Subway
  - Sakura-dōri Line (Station number: S20)

== Layout ==
Kamisawa Station has a single underground island platform with Platform screen doors.

=== Platforms ===
1	■ Sakura-dōri Line	For Tokushige
2	■ Sakura-dōri Line	For Imaike, Nagoya, and Taiko-dori
