= Nonami =

Coordinates: 35.106000°N 136.955181°E

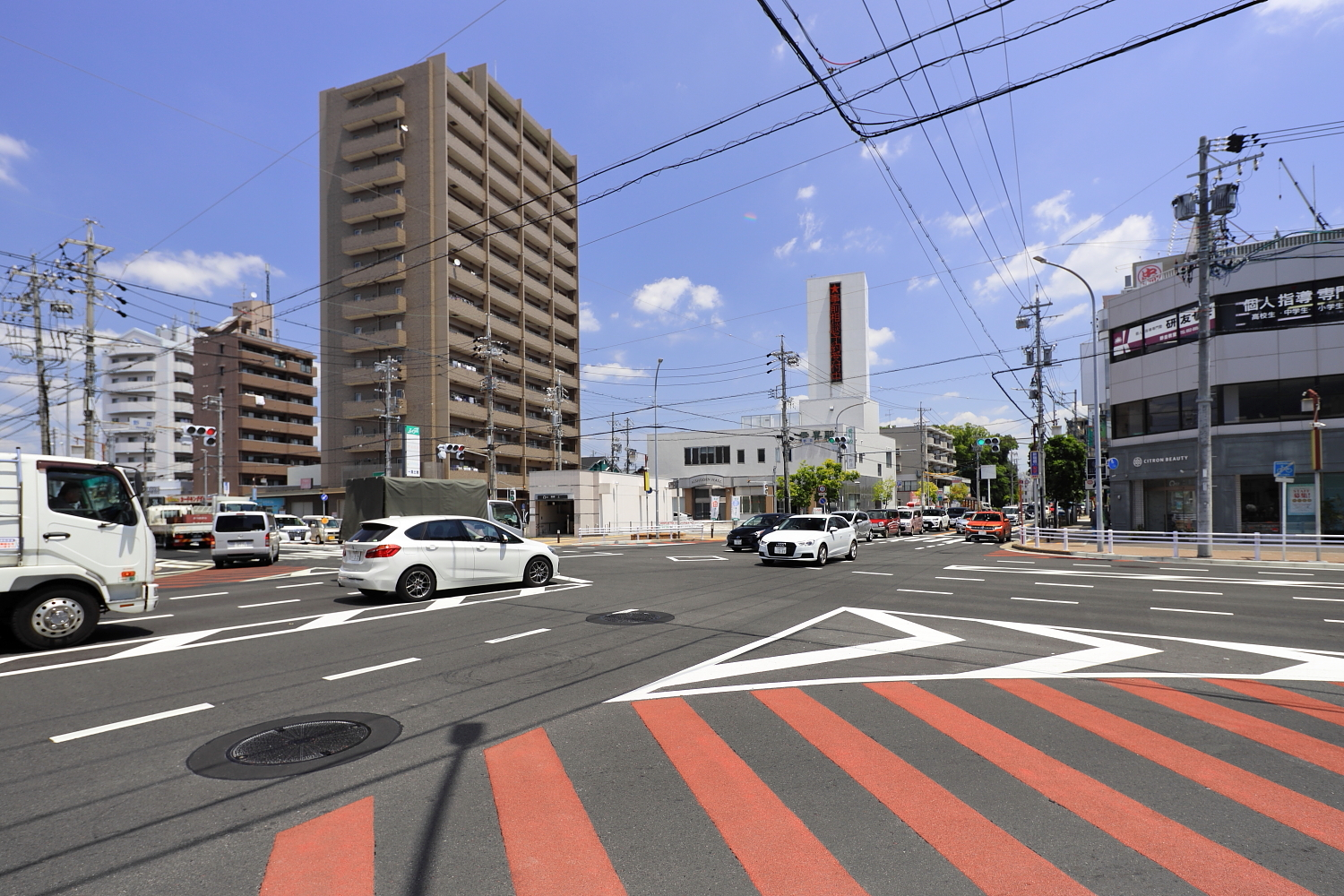
Nonami Crossing, Amahaku Ward, Nagoya City (2021)

Nonami is the area in Tempaku-ku, Nagoya surrounding Nonami Station.

Because it is located on the border of Midori-ku, Nagoya and Tempaku-ku, Nagoya, many customers from Tempaku-ku patronize businesses in Nonami.

== Overview ==
- Although there are numerous establishments (bookstores, convenience stores, etc.) close to the station, big shopping malls are not visible from the station.
- While there are many old buildings, for the sake of having many modern buildings, in the downtown area, there are many kinds of streets especially more modern ones.
- About a five-minute walk from the station, by Tempaku River, are noticeable construction facilities.
- Nonami Station is the last stop on the Sakura-dōri Line. Line extension plans are underway for the future because ridership is very high.

== Transportation ==
- Nonami Station on the Sakura-dōri Line.
- "Nonami" bus stop serviced by the Nagoya City Municipal Bus service.
