= Nonami Station =

Metro station in Nagoya, Japan

Coordinates: 35.1020°N 136.9557°E

S17 Nonami Station 野並駅
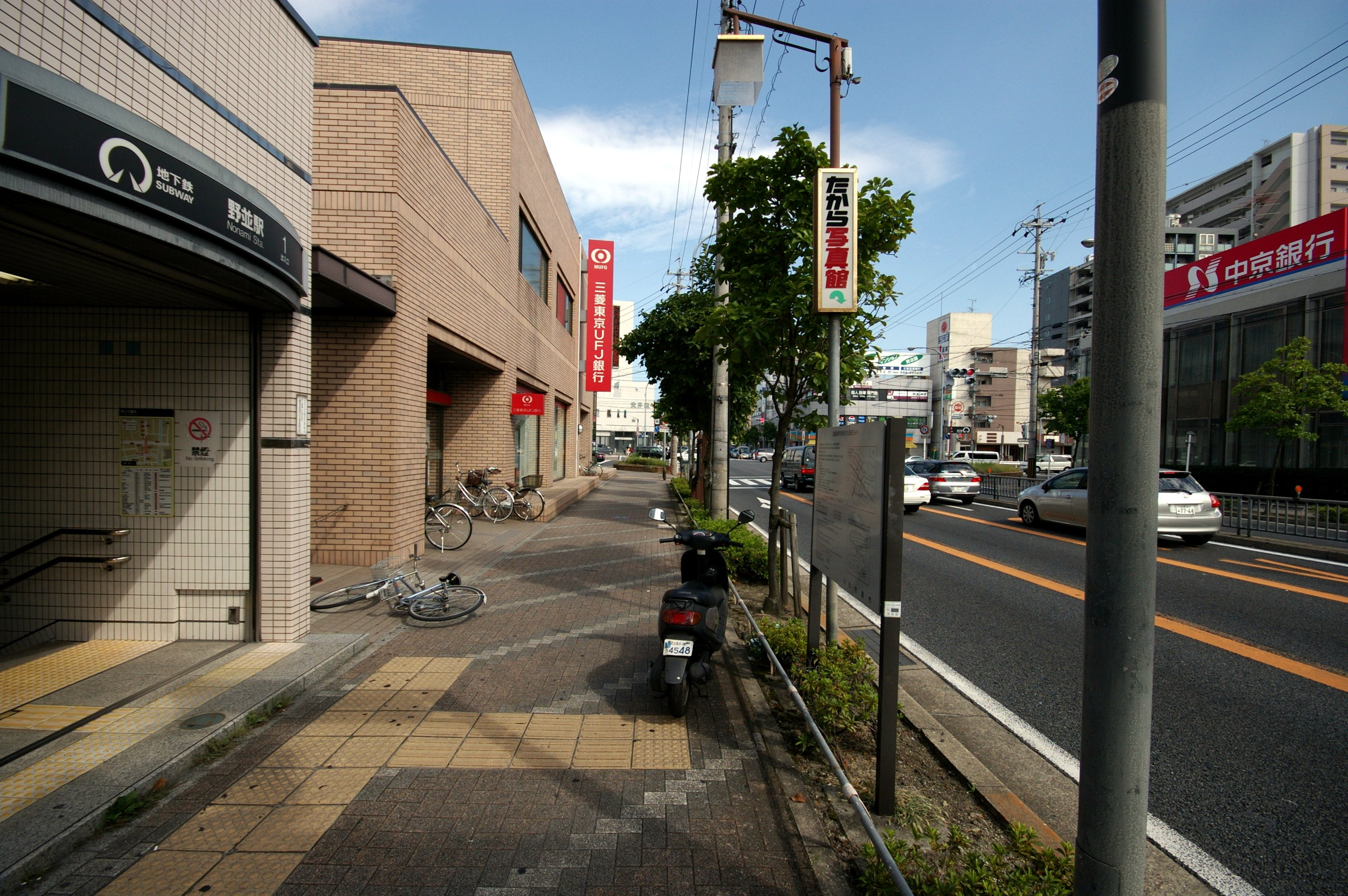

General information
- Location: 200 Furukawa-cho, Tempaku, Nagoya, Aichi （名古屋市天白区古川町200） Japan
- System: Nagoya Municipal Subway station
- Operator: Transportation Bureau City of Nagoya
- Line: Sakura-dōri Line
- Connections: Bus terminal

Other information
- Station code: S17

History
- Opened: 30 March 1994; 32 years ago

Passengers
- 2008: 16,056 daily

Services
Preceding station	Nagoya Municipal Subway	Following station
Tsurusato S16 towards Taiko-dori	Sakura-dōri Line	Naruko Kita S18 towards Tokushige
Location

Nonami Station (野並駅, Nonami-eki) is an underground metro station located in Tempaku-ku, Nagoya, Aichi Prefecture, Japan operated by the Nagoya Municipal Subway's Sakura-dōri Line. It is located 14.9 kilometers from the terminus of the Sakura-dōri Line at Taiko-dori Station.

== History ==
Nonami Station was opened on 30 March 1994. It was the eastern terminus of the Sakura-dōri Line until it was extended to Tokushige, the current eastern terminus, on 27 March 2011.

== Lines ==
- Nagoya Municipal Subway
  - Sakura-dōri Line (Station number: S17)

== Layout ==
Nonami Station has a single underground island platform with platform screen doors.

=== Platforms ===
1	■ Sakura-dōri Line	For Tokushige
2	■ Sakura-dōri Line	For Imaike, Nagoya, and Taiko-dori

==== Former layout ====
1	■ Sakura-dōri Line	For Imaike, Nagoya, and Nakamura Kuyakusho (only for rush hour)
2	■ Sakura-dōri Line	For Imaike, Nagoya, and Nakamura Kuyakusho (used at all times)
