= 6050 series =

6050 series may refer to:

== Japanese train types ==
- Nagoya Municipal Subway 6050 series EMU
- Nishitetsu 6050 series EMU
- Seibu 6050 series, a development of the Seibu 6000 series EMU
- Tobu 6050 series EMU
