= Tokai Gakuen Women's College =

Coordinates: 35°13′00.95″N 136°59′32.95″E

Tokai Gakuen Women’s College
- 東海学園大学短期大学部
- Type: Private; Junior college Women's college
- Active: 1964–2005
- Academic staff: Home Economics
- Location: Tempaku-ku, Nagoya, Nagoya, Aichi Prefecture, Japan

Tokai Gakuen Women’s College (東海学園大学短期大学部, Tokai Gakuen Daigaku Tanki Daigakubu) was a junior college in Tenpaku-ku, Nagoya, Nagoya, Aichi Prefecture, Japan, and was part of the Tokai Gakuen group.

== See also ==
- Tokai Gakuen University
