= Araki Syuseikan Museum =

Art museum in Nagoya, Japan

Coordinates: 35.1129°N 136.9948°E

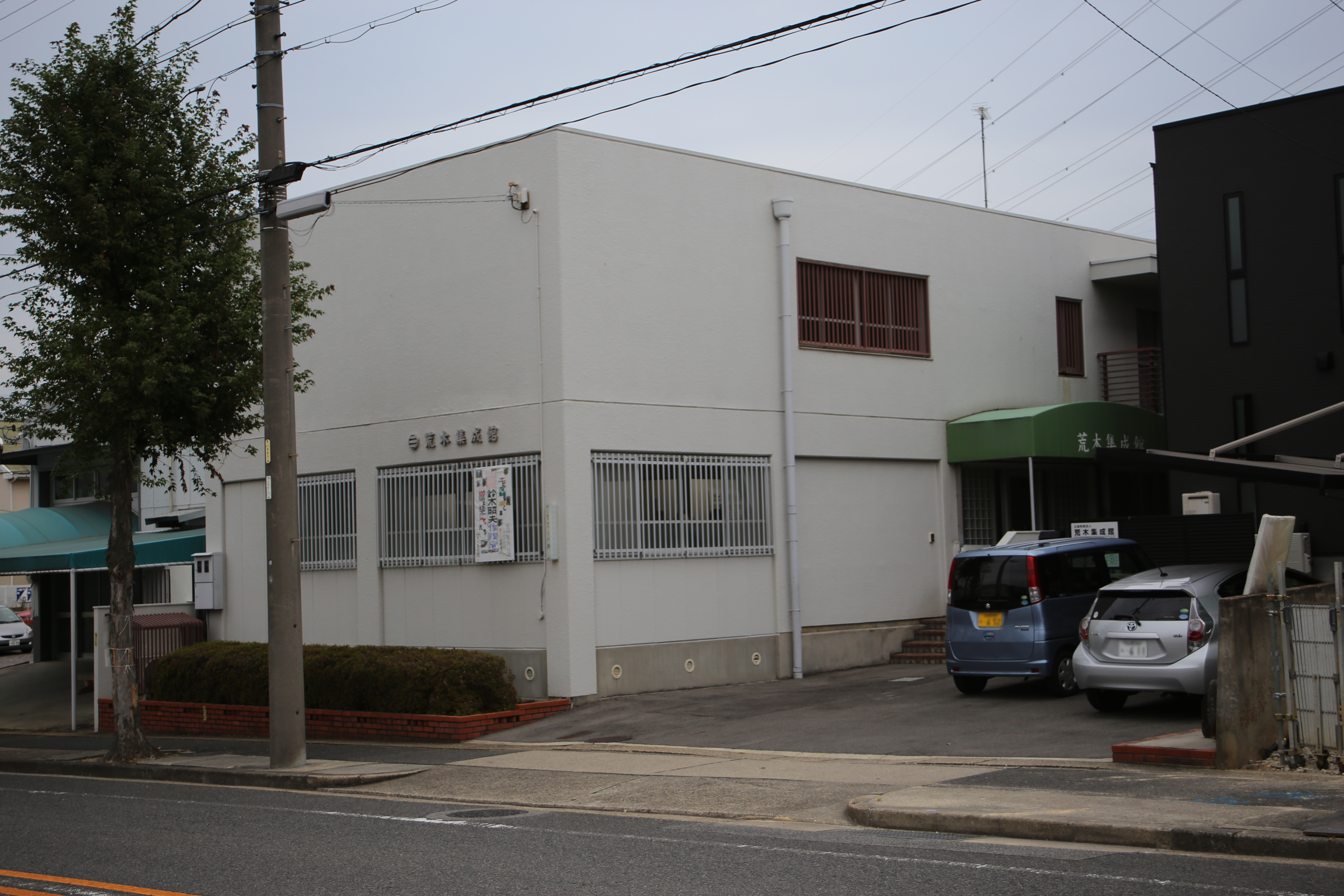
Araki Syuseikan Museum in Nagoya

The Araki Shuseikan Museum (荒木集成館 Araki Shūseikan) is an art museum located in Tenpaku-ku, Nagoya, central Japan.

The collection of Araki Minoru is housed here. The collection includes Japanese ceramics such as Sue wares, teabowls and roof tiles.

Archaeological findings at old kilns are also shown.
