= Sakura-dōri Line =

Subway line in Nagoya, Japan

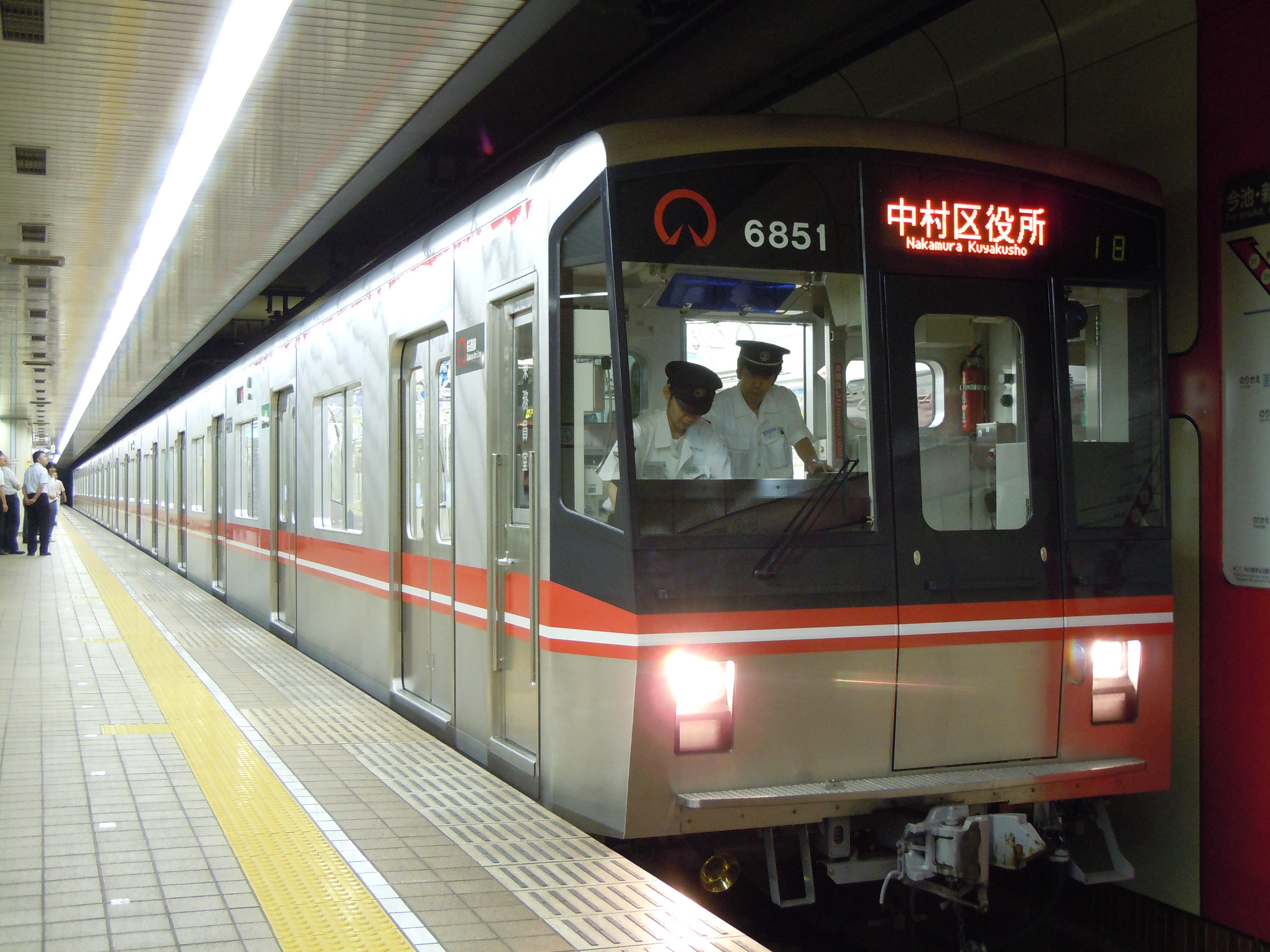
- Sakura-dōri Line 6050 series, July 2010

Overview
- Locale: Nagoya
- Termini: Taiko-dori; Tokushige
- Stations: 21

Service
- Type: Rapid transit
- System: Nagoya Municipal Subway
- Operator: Nagoya City Transportation Bureau
- Depot: Tokushige
- Rolling stock: 6000 series 6050 series
- Daily ridership: 85,173 (2008)

History
- Opened: 10 September 1989; 37 years ago
- Last extension: 2011

Technical
- Line length: 19,085 m (62,615 ft)
- Track length: 19.1 km (11.9 mi)
- Track gauge: 1,067 mm (3 ft 6 in)
- Electrification: 1,500 V DC
- Operating speed: 75 km/h (45 mph)

The Sakura-dōri Line (桜通線, Sakura-dōri-sen) is a subway line in Nagoya, Japan, part of the Nagoya Municipal Subway system. It runs from Taiko-dori in Nakamura Ward to Tokushige in Midori Ward, all within Nagoya. The Sakura-dōri Line's color on maps is red and stations are labeled with the prefix "S". Officially, the line is called the Nagoya City Rapid Railway Line 6 (名古屋市高速度鉄道第6号線, Nagoya-shi Kōsokudo Tetsudō Dai-roku-gō-sen). All stations accept manaca, a rechargeable contactless smart card, and other major Japanese IC cards.

The first section of the line opened in 1989. Between Nagoya and Imaike, the line runs under Sakura-dōri Avenue, serving as a bypass to the Higashiyama Line. Until 2015, it was the only Nagoya Municipal Subway line to use automatic train operation.

All platforms are 8 cars long but only 5-car trains are currently operated.

== Stations ==
All stations are within Nagoya's city boundaries; the line is entirely underground.

No.	Station name	Japanese	Distance (km)		Transfers	Location
No.	Station name	Japanese	Between stations	Total	Transfers	Location
S01	Taiko-dori	太閤通	-	0.0		Nakamura
S02	Nagoya	名古屋	0.9	0.9	Nagoya Municipal Subway: Higashiyama Line (H-08); Chūō Main Line, Kansai Main Line, Tōkaidō Main Line, Tōkaidō Shinkansen; Kintetsu Nagoya Line (Kintetsu Nagoya); Meitetsu Nagoya Line (Meitetsu Nagoya); Aonami Line (AN01)	Nakamura
S03	Kokusai Center (International Center)	国際センター	0.7	1.6		Nakamura
S04	Marunouchi	丸の内	0.8	2.4	Tsurumai Line (T-06)	Naka
S05	Hisaya-ōdōri	久屋大通	0.9	3.3	Meijō Line (M-06)	Naka
S06	Takaoka	高岳	0.7	4.0	Kamiiida Line (planned extension)	Higashi
S07	Kurumamichi	車道	1.3	5.3		Higashi
S08	Imaike	今池	1.0	6.3	Higashiyama Line (H-13)	Chikusa
S09	Fukiage	吹上	1.1	7.4	Nagoya Municipal Subway: Tōbu Line (planned)	Chikusa
S10	Gokiso	御器所	1.0	8.4	Tsurumai Line (T-12)	Shōwa
S11	Sakurayama	桜山	1.1	9.5		Mizuho
S12	Mizuho Kuyakusho	瑞穂区役所	0.9	10.4		Mizuho
S13	Mizuho Undōjō Nishi	瑞穂運動場西	0.7	11.1		Mizuho
S14	Aratama-bashi	新瑞橋	0.7	11.8	Meijō Line (M-23)	Mizuho
S15	Sakura-hommachi	桜本町	1.1	12.9	Nagoya Municipal Subway: Nambu Line (planned)	Minami
S16	Tsurusato	鶴里	0.9	13.8		Minami
S17	Nonami	野並	1.1	14.9		Tempaku
S18	Naruko Kita	鳴子北	1.1	16.0		Tempaku
S19	Aioiyama	相生山	0.9	16.9		Midori
S20	Kamisawa	神沢	1.4	18.3		Midori
S21	Tokushige	徳重	0.8	19.1		Midori

== Rolling stock ==
- 6000 series
- 6050 series

== History ==
The Sakura-dōri Line was first envisioned in the Urban Transportation Council Report No. 14 (1972) as an underground line running from Nakamura Kuyakusho to Imaike, and was intended to relieve the central portion of the Higashiyama Line, which in the late-1970s operated with a crush load capacity of 250% during rush hour.

The line was opened on 10 September 1989 between Nakamura Kuyakusho and Imaike. Automatic train operation (ATO) using a single driver commenced on 16 February 1994, and the line was extended from Imaike to Nonami on 30 March 1994.

From Nonami, the line was extended further east to Tokushige, in Midori-ku, on 27 March 2011. This extension also involved building a new depot near Tokushige Station, which replaced the previous depot located near Nakamura Kuyakusho Station. New 6050 series trains were also purchased as part of the extension.

On 4 January 2023, Nakamura Kuyakusho was renamed to Taiko-dori. There are plans to extend the line even further, somewhere in Toyoake City or Toyota City, and to extend the line in the opposite direction, from Taiko-dori to somewhere in Ama.

== See also ==
- List of railway lines in Japan
