= Nagoya Municipal Subway 6050 series =

Japanese train type

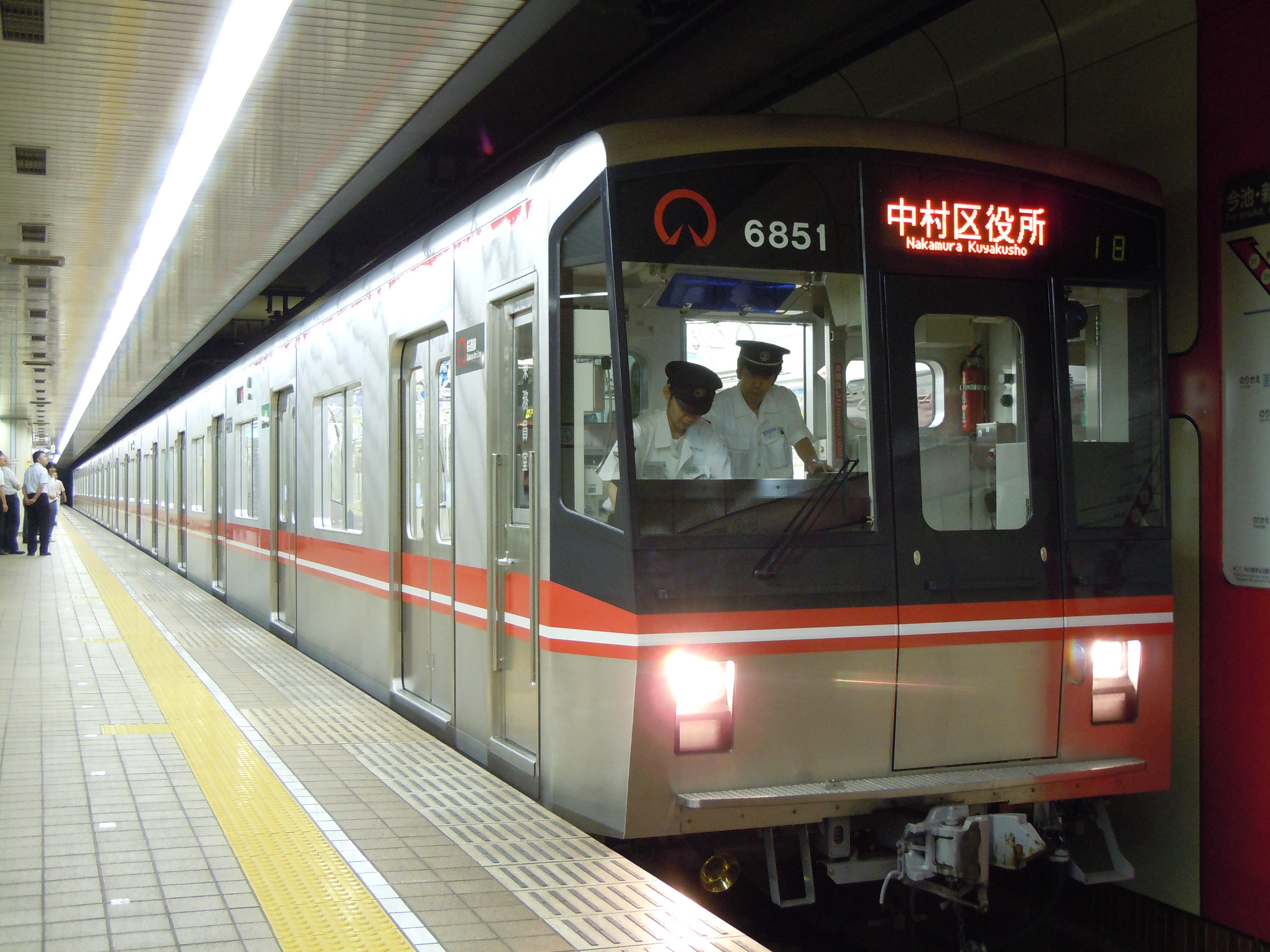
- Set 6151, July 2010
- In service: July 2010 – present
- Manufacturer: Nippon Sharyo
- Constructed: 2010–
- Entered service: 5 July 2010
- Number in service: 20 vehicles (4 sets) (as of 1 April 2011)
- Formation: 5 cars per trainset
- Capacity: 713 (243 seated)
- Operator: Transportation Bureau City of Nagoya
- Line served: Sakura-dōri Line

Specifications
- Car body construction: Stainless steel
- Car length: 20,000 mm (65 ft 7 in)
- Width: 2,746 mm (9 ft 0.1 in)
- Doors: 4 pairs per side
- Maximum speed: 75 km/h (47 mph)
- Acceleration: 3.0 km/(h⋅s) (1.9 mph/s)
- Deceleration: 3.5 km/(h⋅s) (2.2 mph/s) (service); 4.0 km/(h⋅s) (2.5 mph/s) (emergency)
- Electric system: 1,500 V DC
- Current collection: Overhead line
- Bogies: SS176M (motored), SS176T (trailer)
- Safety system: ATC/ATO
- Track gauge: 1,067 mm (3 ft 6 in)

The Nagoya Municipal Subway 6050 series (名古屋市交通局6050形) is a rapid transit electric multiple unit (EMU) train type operated by the Transportation Bureau City of Nagoya on the Nagoya Subway Sakura-dōri Line in Japan since July 2010.

The design is based on the earlier 6000 series trains.

== Formation ==
Trainsets are formed as follows.

Car No.	1	2	3	4	5
Designation	Tc1	M1	M2	M3	Tc2
Numbering	6150	6250	6350	6750	6850
Capacity Total/seated	136/45	147/51	147/51	147/51	136/45

Cars 2, 3, and 4 are each fitted with one single-arm pantograph.

== History ==
The 6050 series was introduced for the extension of the Sakura-dōri Line from Nonami to Tokushige.

The first set, 6151, was delivered from the Nippon Sharyo Toyokawa plant in February 2010.
