= Nagoya Municipal Bus =

Bus service

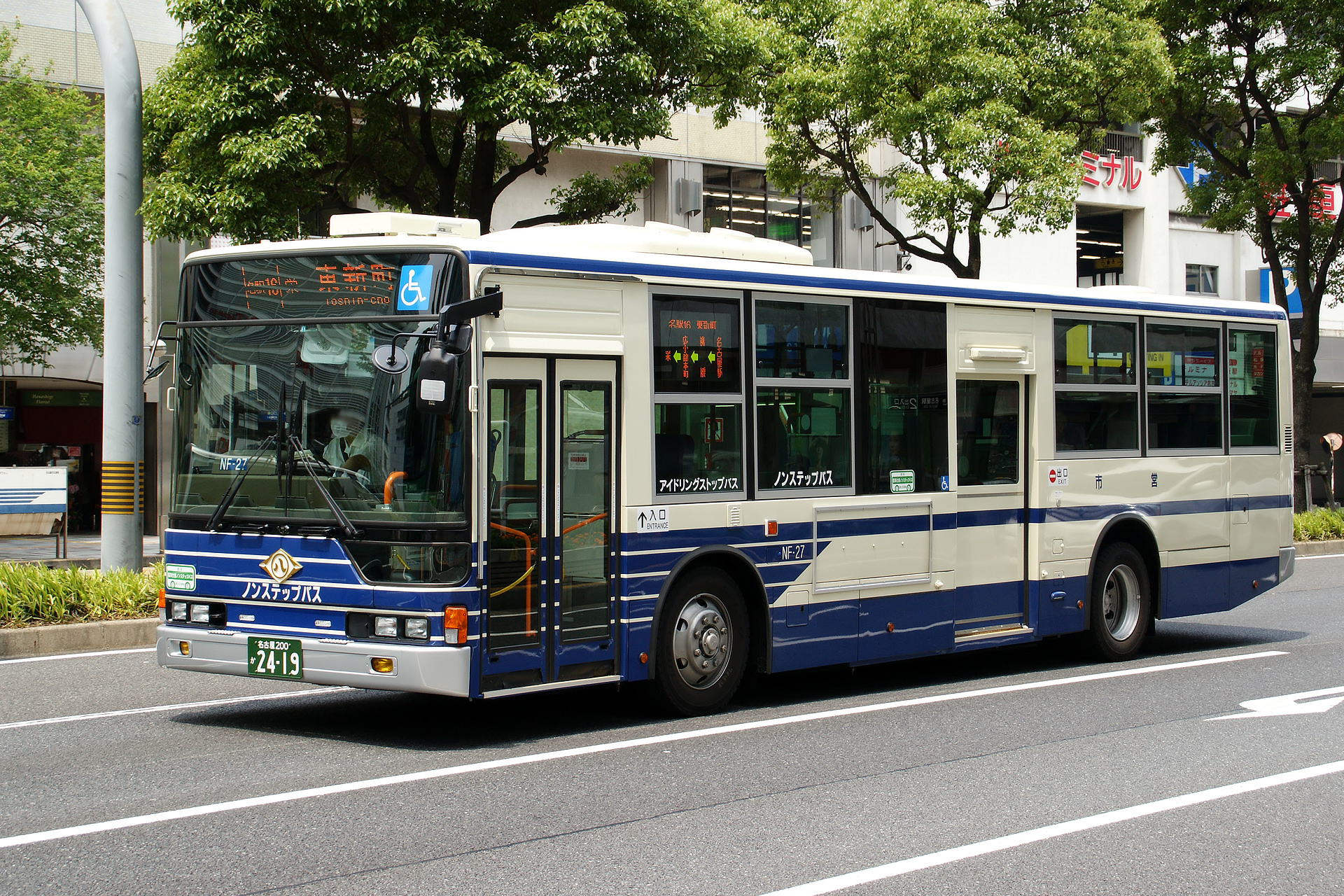
Bus in the Nakagawa Ward, Mitsubishi Fuso Aero Star rolling stock (2009)

The Nagoya Municipal Bus (名古屋市営バス, Nagoya Shiei Basu) is a bus service operated by the Bus Service Division of the Nagoya City Transportation Bureau. It is also called the City Bus (市バス, Shibasu).

The bureau mainly operates bus routes in the wards of Nagoya.

== See also ==
- List of bus operating companies in Japan
