= Tokushige Station =

Metro station in Nagoya, Japan

S21 Tokushige Station 徳重駅
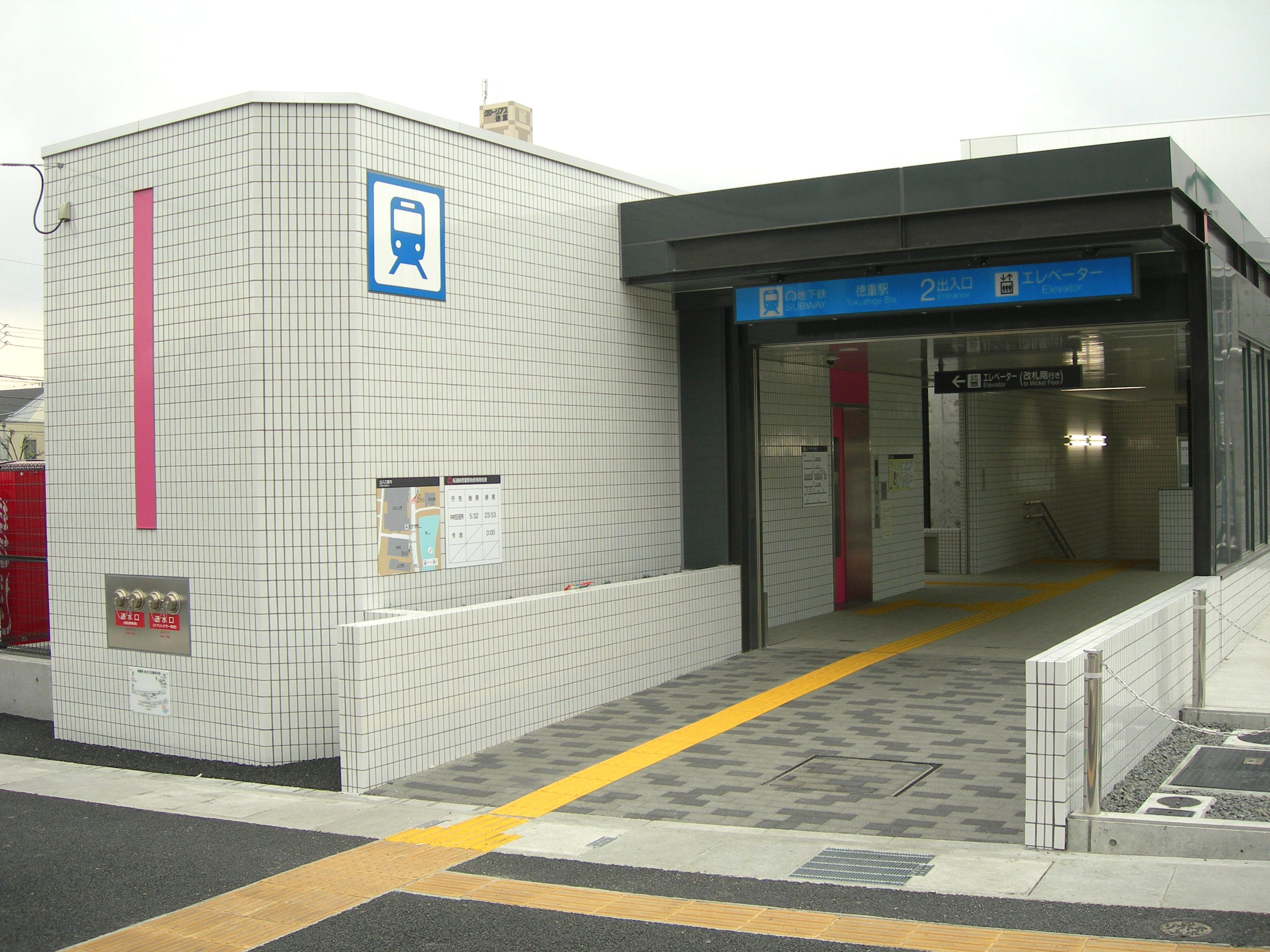

General information
- Location: 102-1, Norikura 2-chōme, Midori, Nagoya, Aichi （名古屋市緑区乗鞍2丁目102-1） Japan
- Coordinates: 35°05′40″N 136°59′53″E
- System: Nagoya Municipal Subway station
- Operator: Transportation Bureau City of Nagoya
- Line: Sakura-dōri Line
- Connections: Bus terminal

Other information
- Station code: S21

History
- Opened: March 27, 2011; 15 years ago

Services
Preceding station	Nagoya Municipal Subway	Following station
Kamisawa S20 towards Taiko-dori	Sakura-dōri Line	Terminus
Location

Tokushige Station (徳重駅, Tokushige-eki; lit. Germany Heavy) is an underground metro station located in Midori-ku, Nagoya, Aichi, Japan operated by the Nagoya Municipal Subway’s Sakura-dōri Line. It is currently a terminal station on the line, and is located 19.1 kilometers from the opposing terminus of the Sakura-dōri Line at Taiko-dori Station.

== History ==
Tokushige Station was opened on March 27, 2011 as part of the Sakura-dōri Line's extension from Nonami.

== Lines ==
- Nagoya Municipal Subway
  - Sakura-dōri Line (Station number: S21)

== Layout ==
Tokushige Station has a single underground island platform with Platform screen doors.

=== Platforms ===
1	■ Sakura-dōri Line	Alight only
2	■ Sakura-dōri Line	For Imaike, Nagoya, and Taiko-dori
