= Midori-ku, Nagoya =

Midori 緑区
- Ward
- Midori Ward
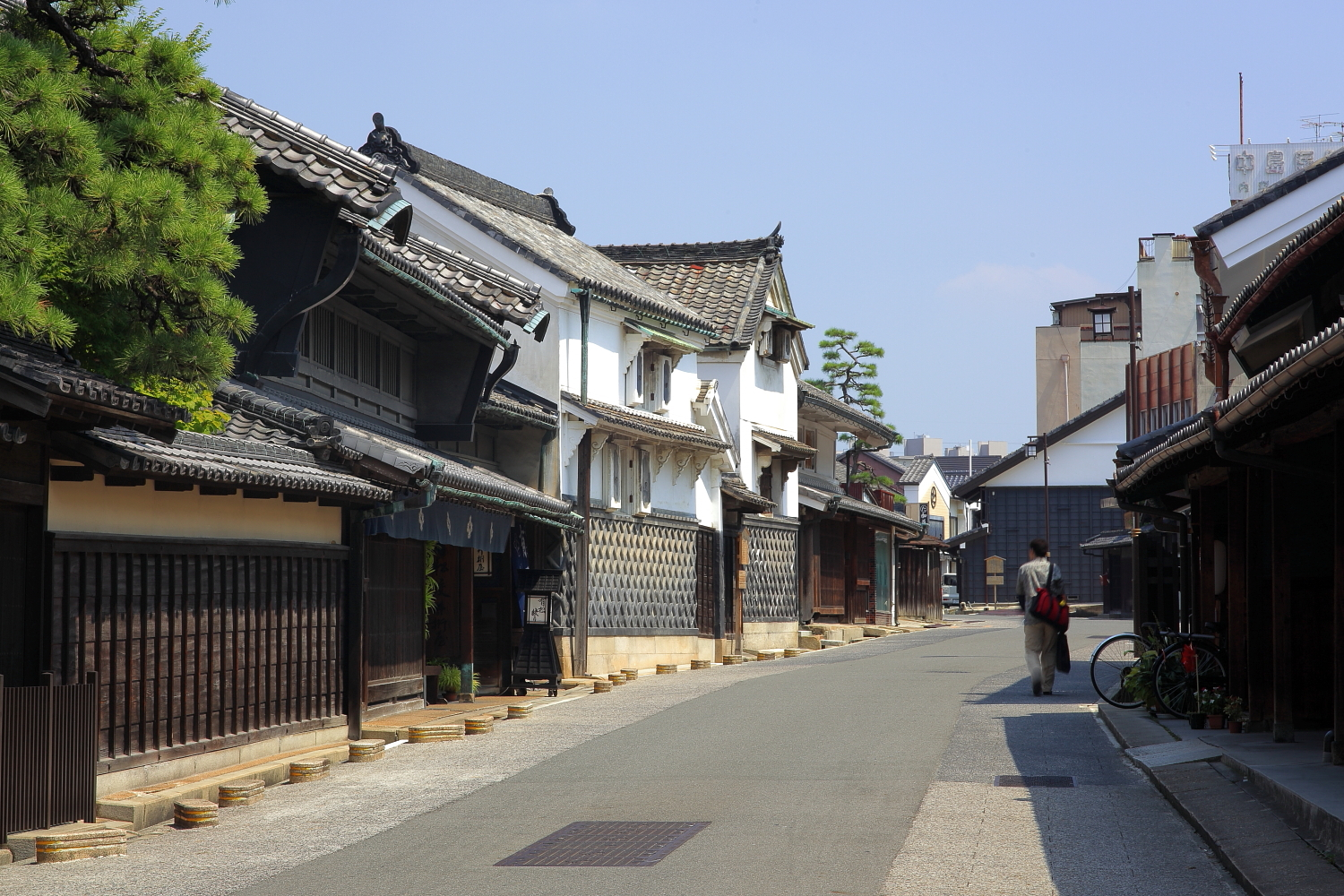
- Arimatsu Historic Townscape on the Tokaido road in Midori-ku

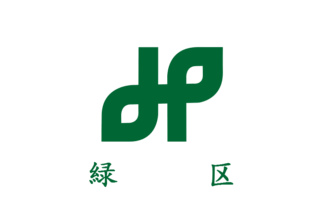
- Flag

- Location of Midori-ku in Nagoya

- Coordinates: 35°04′15″N 136°57′08″E
- Country: Japan
- Region: Tōkai region Chūbu region
- Prefecture: Aichi

Area
  - Total: 37.91 km^{2} (14.64 sq mi)

Population (October 1, 2019)
  - Total: 247,475
  - Density: 6,528/km^{2} (16,910/sq mi)
- Time zone: UTC+9 (Japan Standard Time)
- Tree: Maple
- Flower: Gymnaster savatieri
- Phone number: 052-621-2111
- Address: 2-15 Aoyama, Midori-ku, Nagoya-shi, Aichi-ken 458-8585
- Website: www.city.nagoya.jp/midori/ (in Japanese)

Midori-ku (緑区, Midori-ku) is one of the 16 wards of the city of Nagoya in Aichi Prefecture, Japan. As of 1 October 2019, the ward had an estimated population of 247,475 and a population density of 6,528 persons per km^{2}. The total area was 37.91 km^{2}. It is the largest of the wards of Nagoya in terms of population.

== Geography ==
Midori Ward is the southeast portion of the city of Nagoya.

=== Surrounding municipalities ===
- Tenpaku Ward
- Minami Ward
- Tōkai
- Ōbu
- Nisshin
- Toyoake
- Tōgō

== History ==
The area of what is now Midori Ward was the site of the Battle of Okehazama during the Sengoku period, between the forces of Oda Nobunaga and Imagawa clan. All of what is now Midori Ward was part of the holdings of Owari Domain during the Edo period. The Tōkaidō post town of Narumi-juku prospered under the Tokugawa shogunate. After the Meiji Restoration, the area was organized into villages under Aichi District or northern Chita District within Aichi Prefecture. Narumi became a town in 1889, followed by Arimatsu in 1890 and Odaka in 1895. Efforts to merge these towns with the neighboring city of Nagoya began in 1953 and 1955, but were virulently opposed by the local residents, resulting recall motions for town mayors, and eventually violent riots. On April 1, 1963, after a third referendum, Narumi was annexed by Nagoya, becoming the new ward of Midori. Narumi was followed by Odaka and a portion of Arimatsu on December 1, 1964, with each of the former towns retaining its own local sub-ward office and considerable local autonomy. These sub-ward offices were amalgamated into a new Midori Ward office on January 21, 1974; however, the sub-wards were retained as local administrative divisions until 2007. With the opening of the Nagoya Municipal Subway’s Sakura-dōri Line, the population of the ward increased, and surpassed Nakagawa Ward in 2004 to become the most populous ward in Nagoya. A new ward office was opened on May 6, 2010.

== Transportation ==
=== Railroads ===
- Central Japan Railway Company - Tōkaidō Main Line
  - Minami-Ōdaka - Ōdaka
- Meitetsu - Nagoya Main Line
  - Chūkyō-keibajō-mae - Arimatsu - Sakyōyama - Narumi
- Nagoya Municipal Subway - Sakura-dōri Line
  - Aioiyama - Kamisawa - Tokushige

=== Highways ===
- Nagoya Expressway - Route 3
- Isewangan Expressway
- Mei-Nikan Expressway
- Chitahantō Road
- Japan National Route 1
- Japan National Route 23
- Japan National Route 247
- Japan National Route 302
- Japan National Route 366

== Local attractions ==
- Narumi-juku
- ruins of Narumi Castle
- ruins of Odaka Castle

== Gallery ==
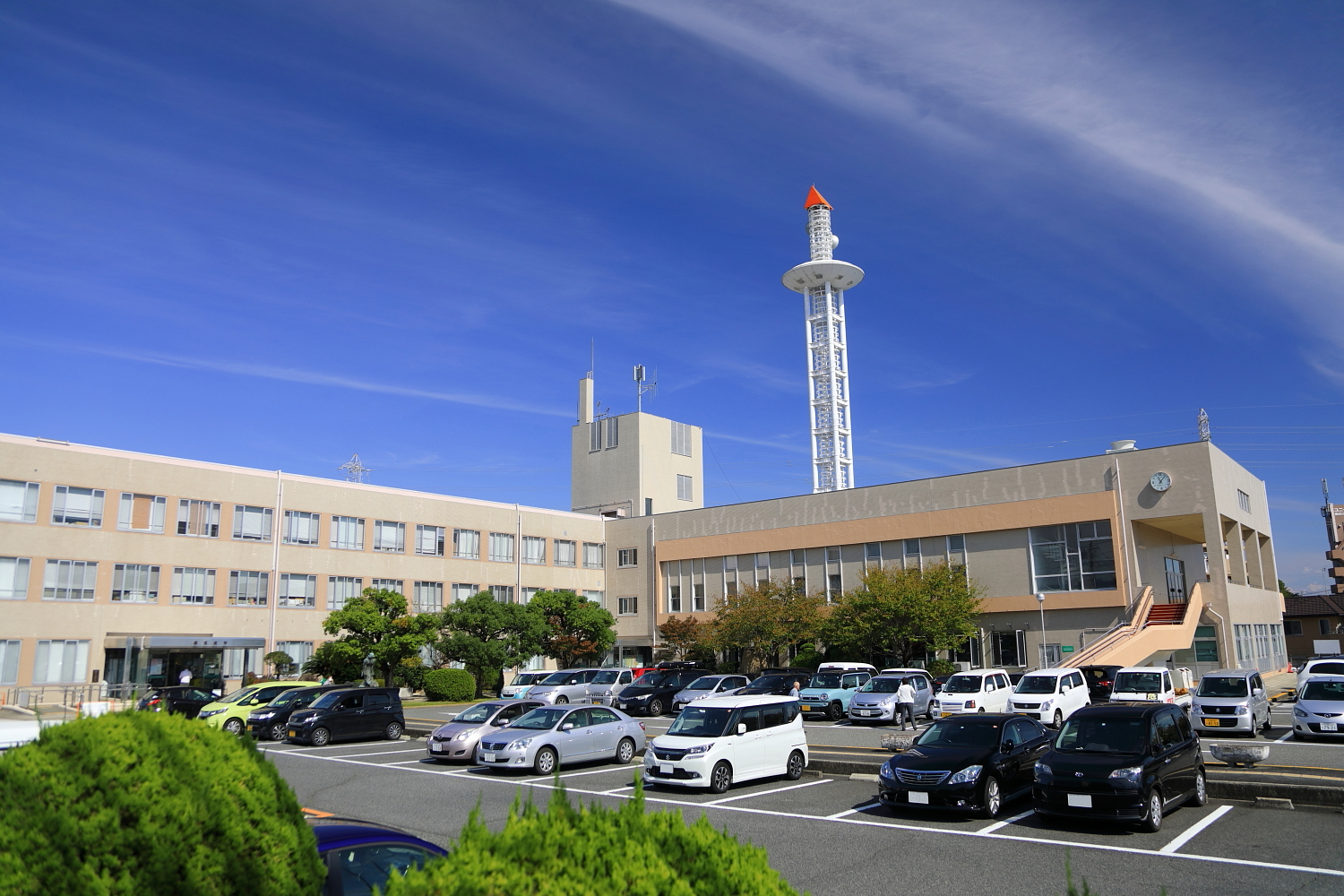
Midori Ward Office

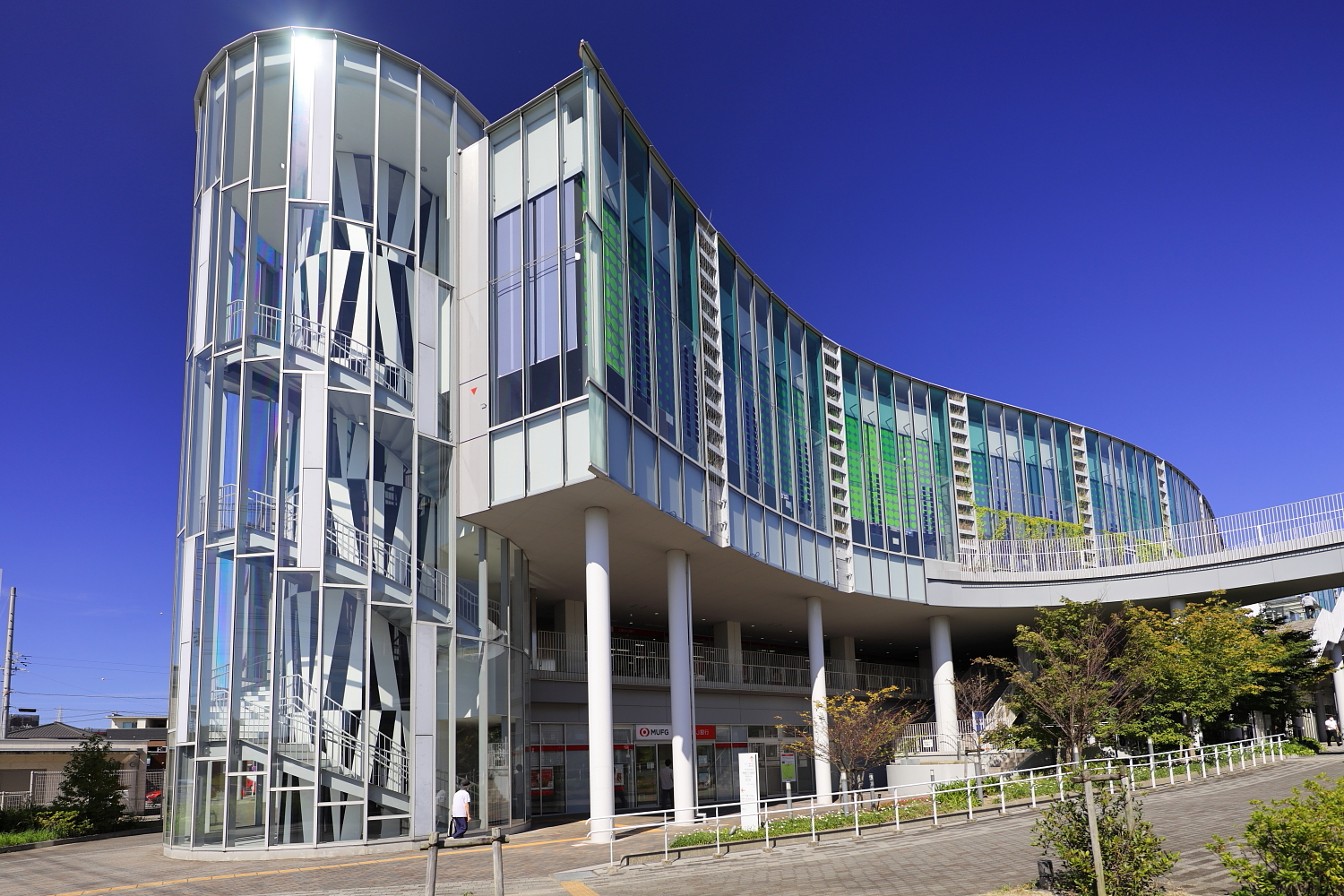
Yumeria Tokushige (Midori Ward Office Tokushige Branch)

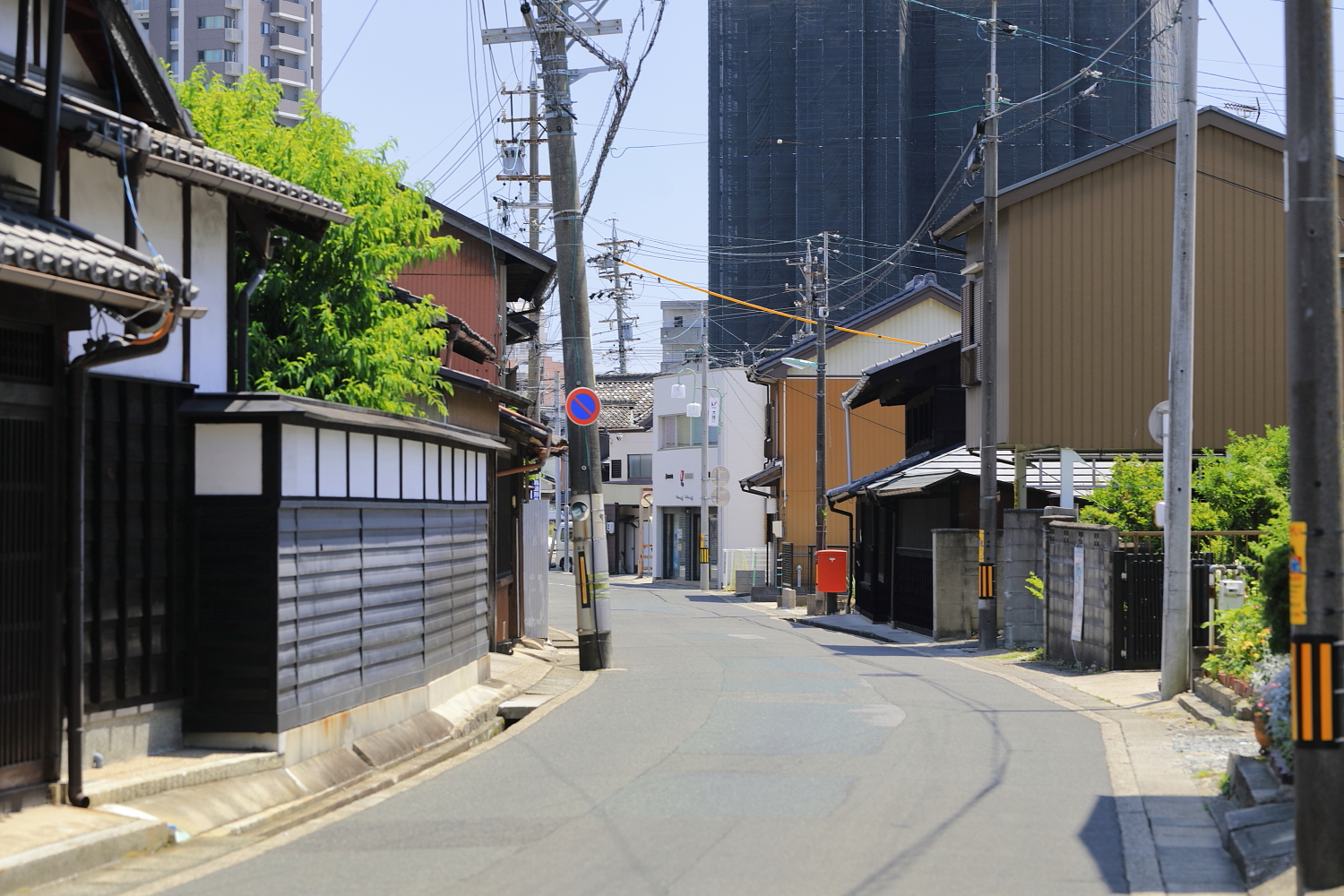
Present-day Narumi-juku

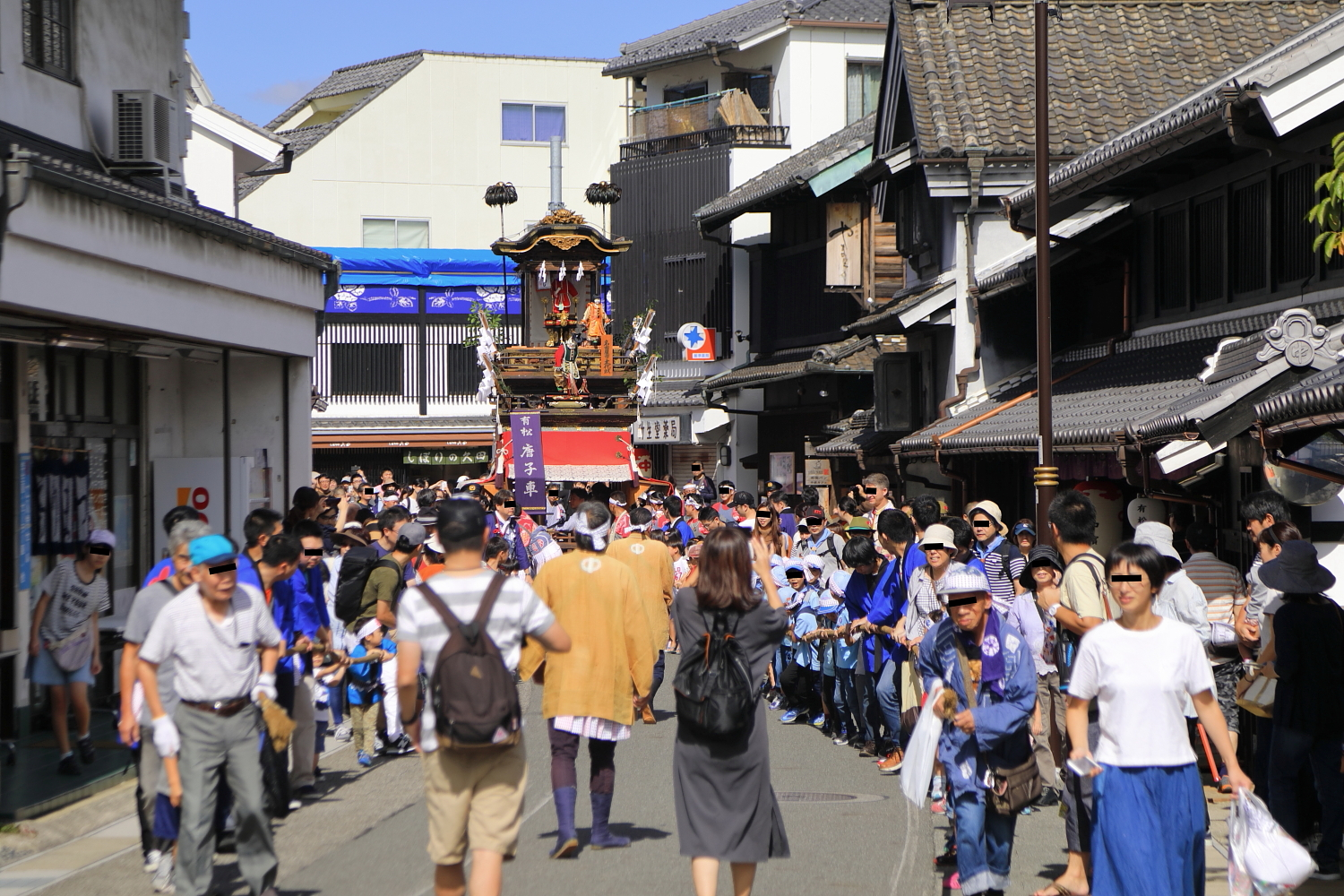
Arimatsu-Temman-sha Autumn Festival

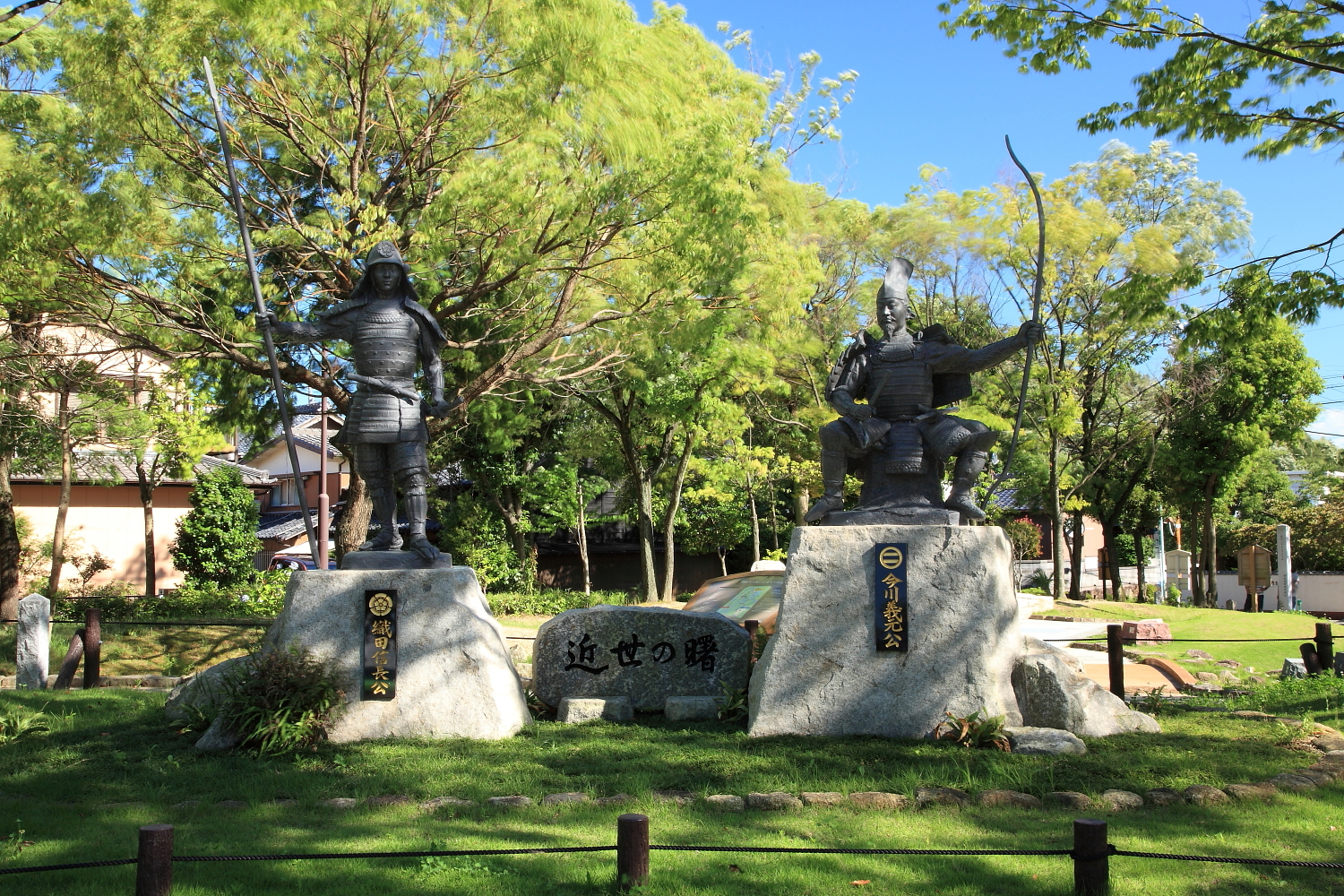
Old Battlefield of Okehazama

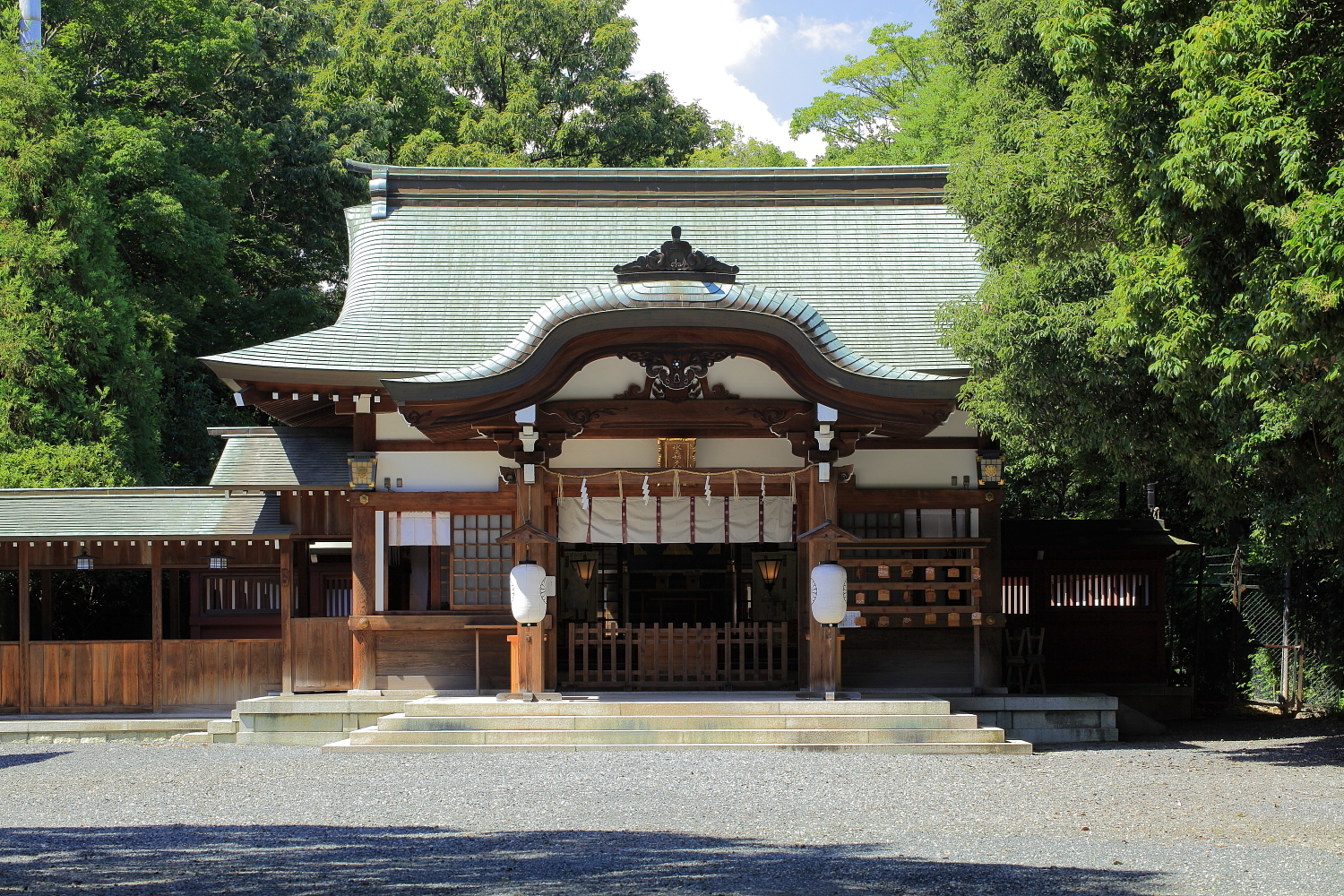
Hikami-Anego-Jinja Shrine

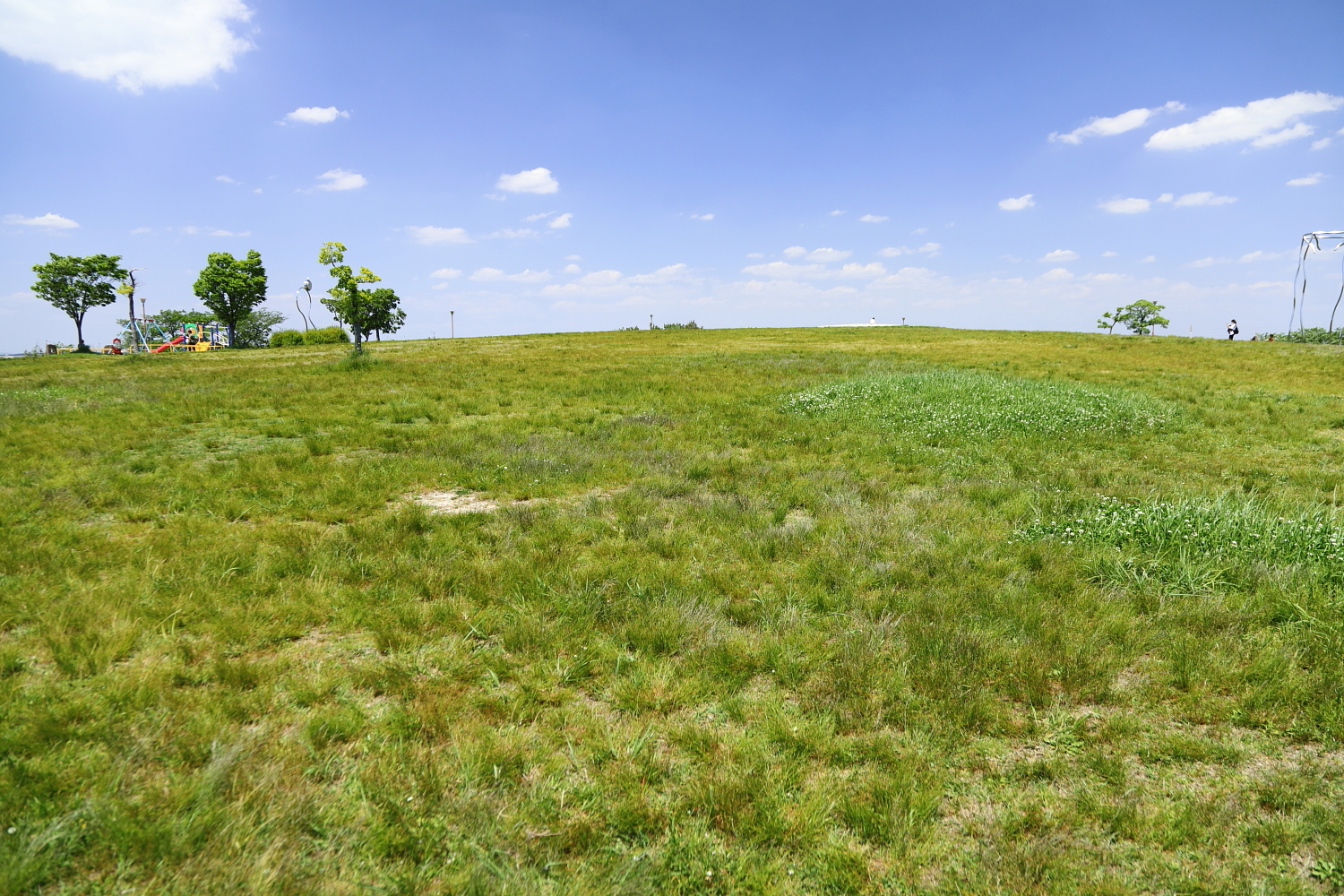
Takinomizu Park

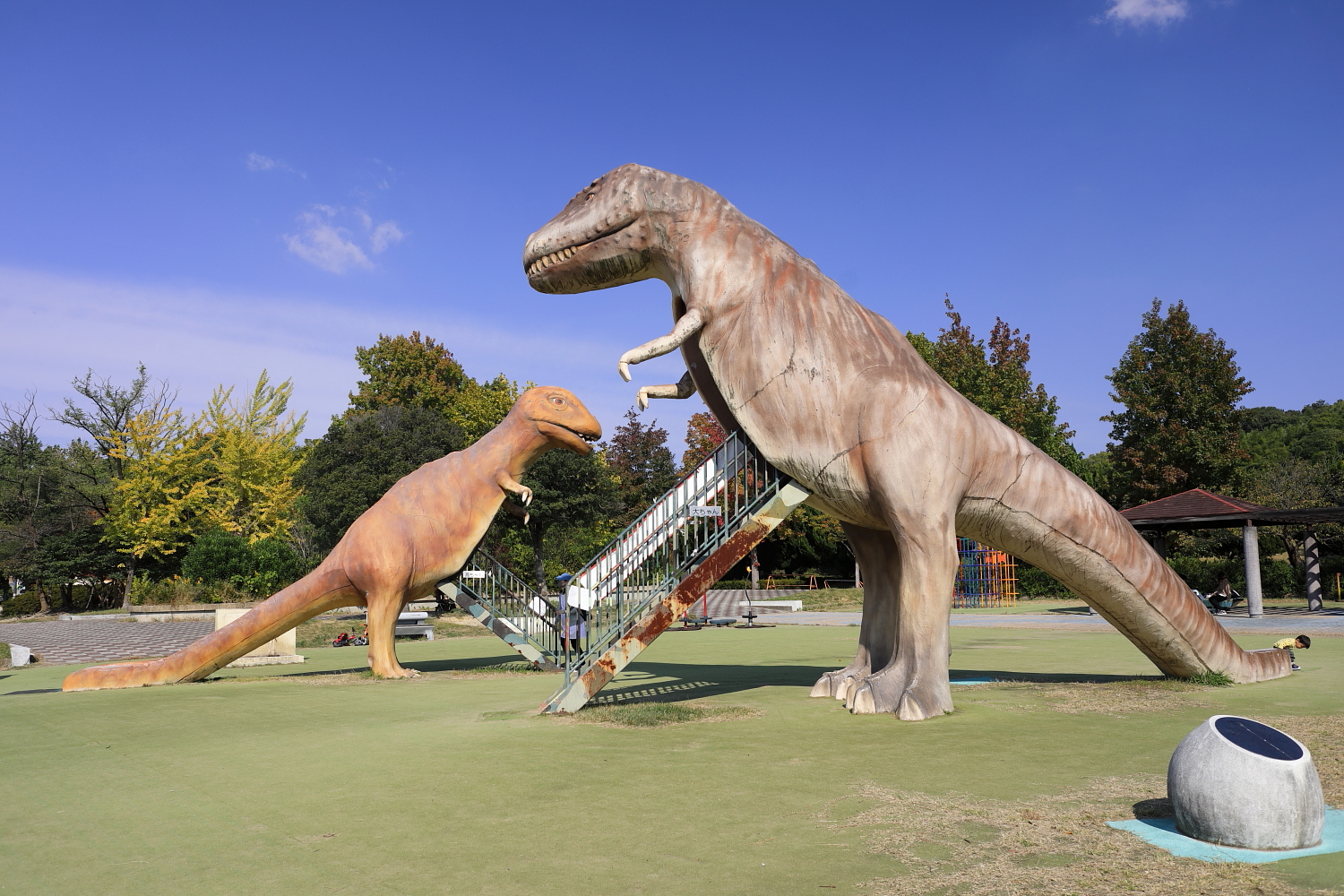
Dinosaur Park in Odaka Ryokuchi

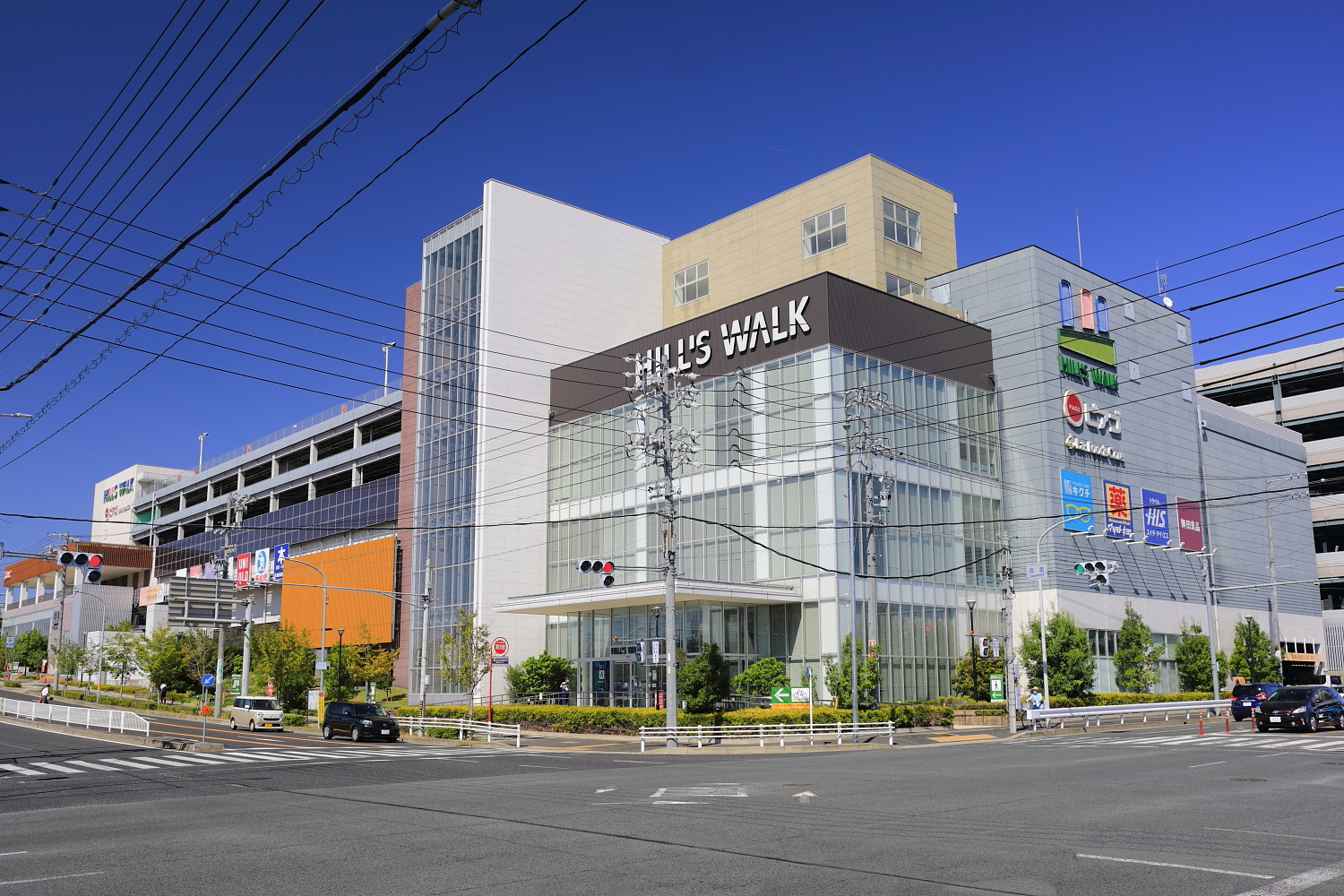
HILL'S WALK Tokusige Gardens

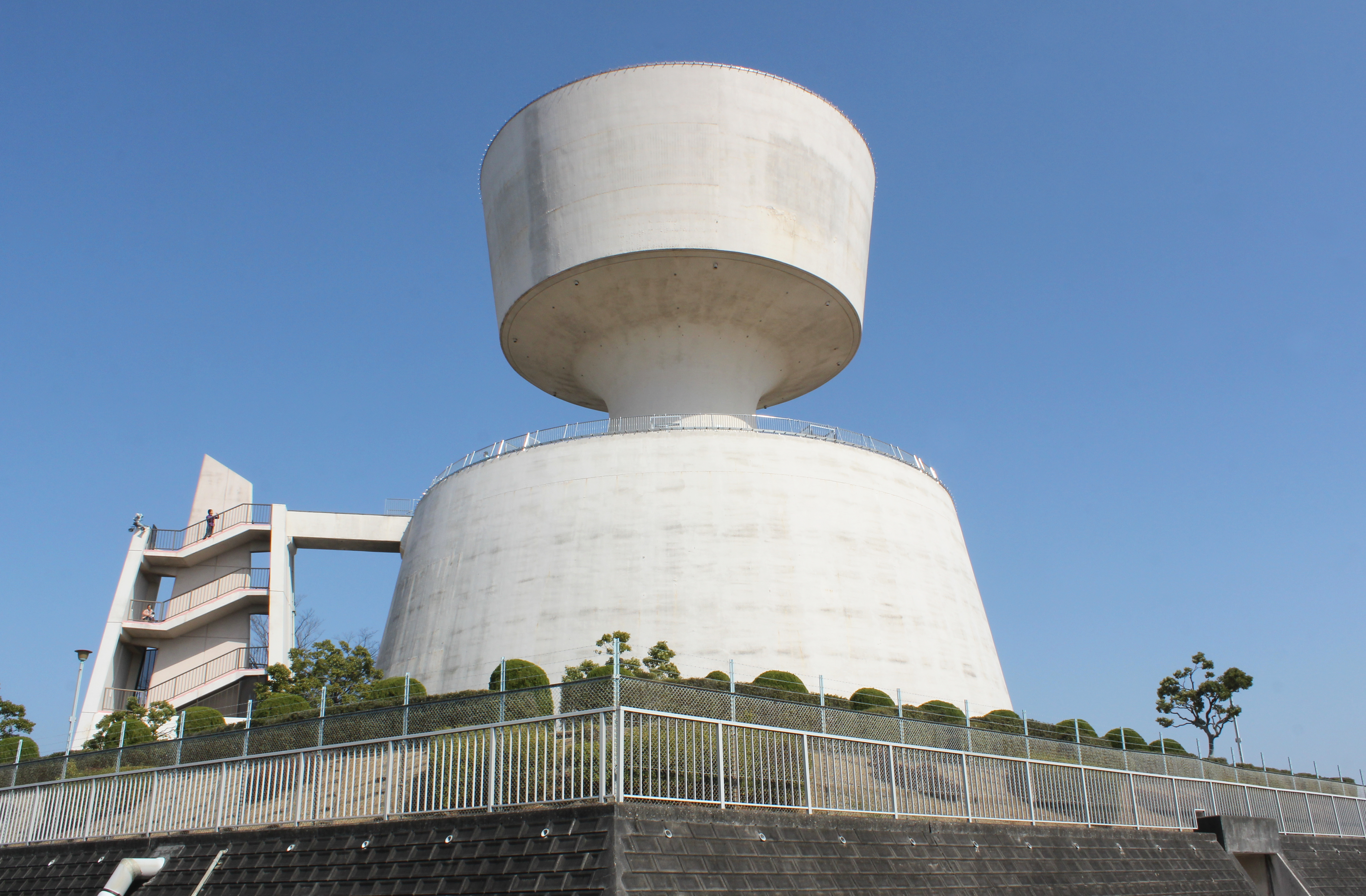
Narumi Water Distribution Station

== Noted people from Midori-ku, Nagoya ==
- Shintarō Tokita – musician
- Junichi Komoto – comedian (lived here when he was an infant. However, he later resided in Okayama city)
- Hitomi Sato – actress
