= Nagoya Station =

Japanese railway station

CA68 CF00 CJ00 H08 S02 Nagoya Station 名古屋駅
- The station building in 2026

General information
- Location: 1-4, Meieki 1-chōme, Nakamura-ku, Nagoya; Aichi Prefecture; Japan
- Coordinates: 35°10′14.78″N 136°52′53.77″E
- Operator: JR Central; Nagoya Municipal Subway; Nagoya Rinkai Rapid Transit
- Lines: Tokaido Shinkansen; Tōkaidō Main Line; Chūō Main Line; Kansai Main Line; Higashiyama Line; Sakura-dōri Line; Aonami Line
- Connections: Meitetsu Nagoya (Nagoya Main Line); Kintetsu Nagoya (Nagoya Line)

History
- Opened: 1 May 1886; 140 years ago

Passengers
- FY2024: 416,867 daily; 369.436 daily; 37,100 daily
Services
Preceding station	JR Central	Following station
Kyōto towards Shin-Ōsaka	Tokaido Shinkansen Nozomi	Shin-Yokohama towards Tokyo
Gifu-Hashima towards Shin-Ōsaka	Tokaido Shinkansen Hikari	Toyohashi towards Tokyo
Gifu-Hashima towards Shin-Ōsaka	Tokaido Shinkansen Kodama	Mikawa-Anjō towards Tokyo
Owari-Ichinomiya CA72 towards Maibara	Tōkaidō Main Line Special Rapid New Rapid Rapid Semi Rapid	Kanayama CA66 towards Atami
Biwajima CA69 towards Maibara	Tōkaidō Main Line Local	Otobashi CA67 towards Atami
Terminus	Chūō Main Line Home liner Shinano Rapid Semi Rapid Local	Kanayama CF01 towards Shiojiri
Terminus	Kansai Main Line Nanki Mie Rapid	Kuwana CJ07 towards JR Namba
Terminus	Kansai Main Line Semi Rapid Local	Hatta CJ01 towards JR Namba
Location
- Location within Nagoya Location within Aichi Prefecture Location within Japan

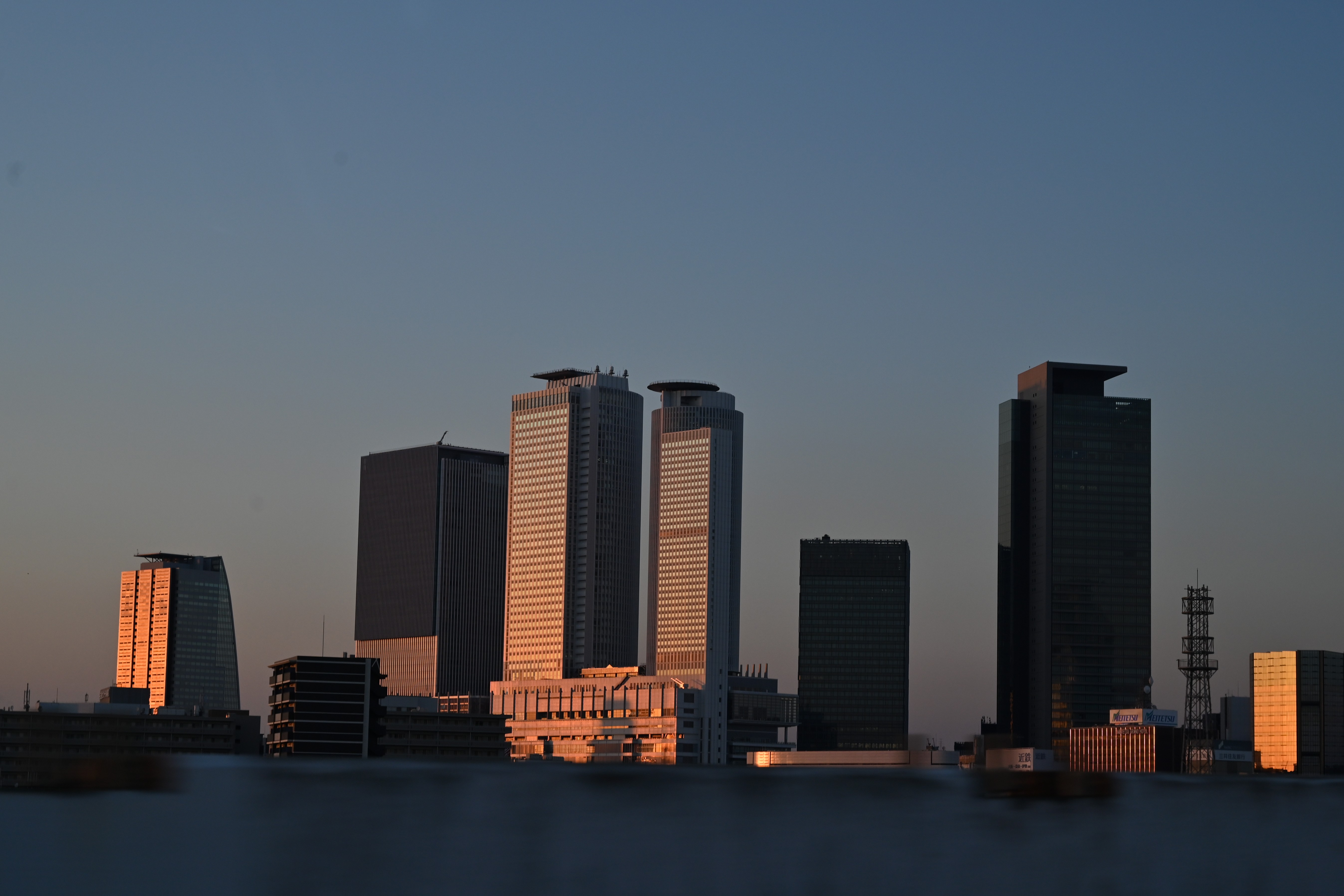
Nagoya Station at dusk

Nagoya Station (名古屋駅, Nagoya-eki) is a terminal railway station in Nakamura-ku, Nagoya, Japan. It formerly held the world record for the largest train station by floor area (410,000 m^{2}), including JR Central Towers atop the station. The station services the Meieki (名駅) area in the Japanese addressing system, the commercial center of Nagoya. The station is adjacent to the Meitetsu Nagoya Station, the terminal of Meitetsu; and the Kintetsu Nagoya Station, the terminal of the Kintetsu Nagoya Line. It is assigned station numbers CA68, CF00, and CJ00 for the JR Central lines, H08 and S02 for the Nagoya Municipal Subway (NMS) lines, and AN01 for the Aonami Line.

Nagoya Station was initially opened on 1 May 1886, as a station on an unnamed branch line extending south from the Tokyo-Osaka railway, which was originally planned to take the inland Nakasendō route. After the route of the railway line was revised to take the Tōkaidō route, the station became part of the Tōkaidō Main Line. Since its opening, the station building has been reconstructed multiple times, most recently in 1999. The NMS first connected the station to their network in 1957. The Aonami Line began carrying passengers in 2006, after serving as a freight-only line. Construction works are underway to convert the station into the western terminus of the first section of the Chūō Shinkansen, by building two underground platforms.

JR Central operates the station. The JR Central station has six island platforms on the eastern side, and two more on the western side. The stations on the NMS lines have two island platforms, each for their respective served lines. The separate station for the Aonami Line has a single island platform for the line.

Four limited express trains (Shinano, Nanki, Hida, Shirasagi) and an additional named rapid service, Mie, serve the station. The station is connected to a bus terminal operated by the Nagoya City Transportation Bureau.

== Location and lines ==
The station is located in Meieki area of Nagoya, popular among tourists visiting Aichi Prefecture. The area's name is officially recognized in the Japanese addressing system. In the area, major redevelopments led by Meitetsu have been taking place. Meieki has been competing over the position of the commercial center of Nagoya against Sakae and Kanayama.

The JR Central-owned station is served by the Tokaido Shinkansen, the Tōkaidō Main Line, the Chūō Main Line, and the Kansai Main Line. Semi-rapid services to Taketoyo Station via Taketoyo Line depart from the station during the evening, and operate on the Tokaido Main Line all day. Limited express services, such as the Hida and Nanki, provide service to the Takayama Main Line and the Kisei Main Line, while Shirasagi and Shinano limited express services run on the Tōkaidō and Chūō Lines.

The station is also served by the Aonami Line operated by the third-sector Nagoya Rinkai Rapid Transit on a separate platform. Nagoya Municipal Subway operates an underground station with the same name, and is served by the Higashiyama Line and Sakura-dōri Line.

== History ==
=== Background ===
The Japanese government initially intended to build a trunk line connecting Tokyo and Osaka with a route that goes through central Chūbu region, which was named the Nakasendo route. The seaside Tōkaidō route was avoided at first by Japanese officials, due to concerns of vulnerability to foreign naval gunfire in case of wars. In the plan, a branch line would be constructed between Gifu Station and Taketoyo Station to transport materials for the main line, and Nagoya would've been serviced by only the branch line. The Nakasendo line from Gifu would've continued east instead of heading southeast towards Nagoya, linking Tajimi, Ena, Shiojiri, Matsumoto, Ueda, Takasaki, and Tokyo. The city of Nagoya opposed the plan, as they considered the plan would hinder their progress to modernize the city. After the construction and commencement of operations on the Taketoyo Line in 1886, the mayor of Nagoya convinced Inoue Masaru, the first Director of Railways, to change his mind.

=== Post–construction ===
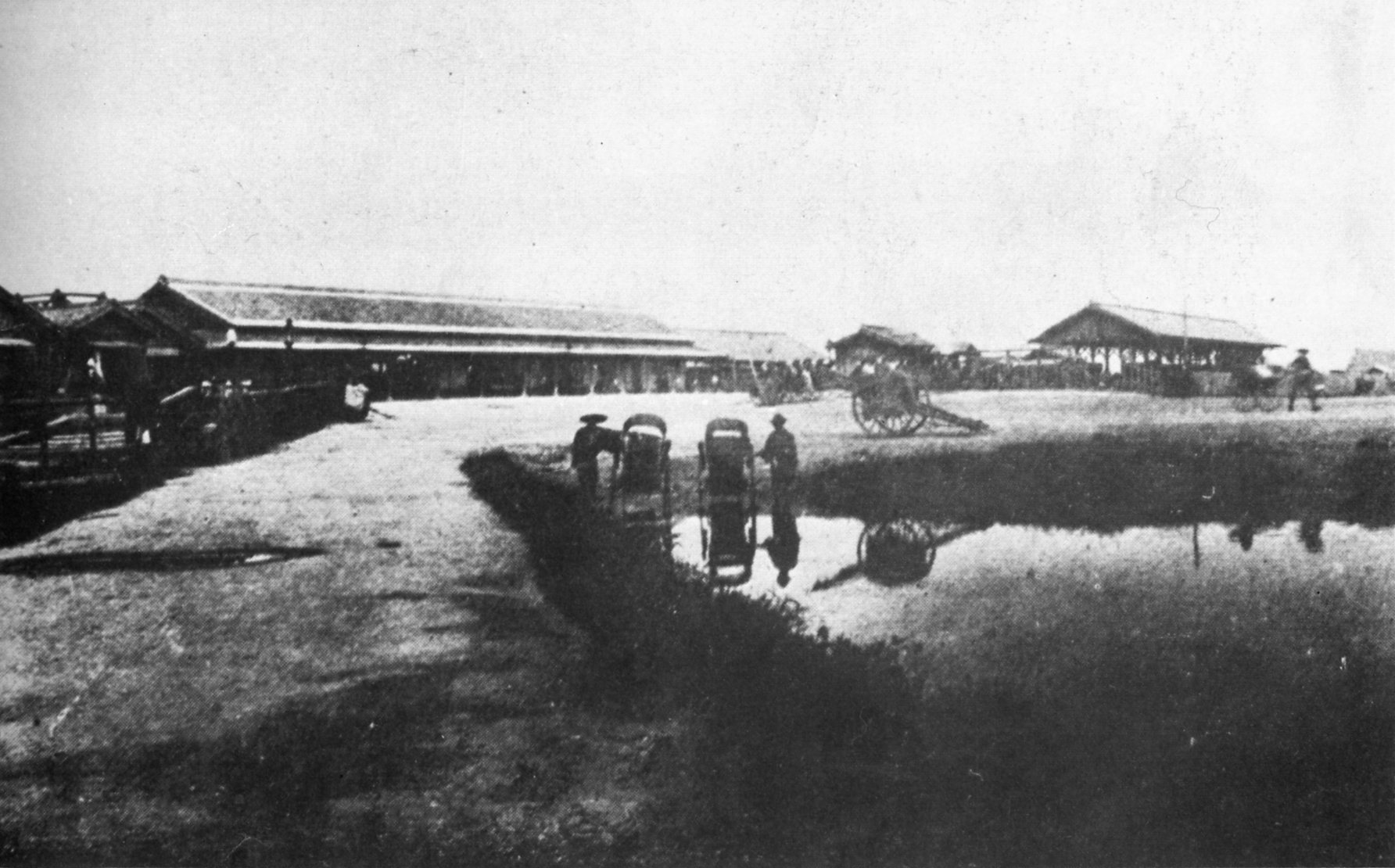
The station in its first year

Nagoya Station first opened on 1 May 1886. During the station's first year, the station was named differently with the name "名護屋 (lit. 'Nagoya')". On 19 July 1886, the government officially announced that the route of the Tokyo-Osaka railway would be changed to the Tōkaidō route. Nagoya Station was incorporated as a part of the Tōkaidō Main Line (Note: The line was not officially named until 1 April 1895.) as a result. The station was surrounded by rice farms when it opened. The first station building was located 200 meters to the south of the current position, near the current Sasashima-raibu Station. The station building was wooden, with two side platforms and two tracks. The first station building collapsed from the 1891 Mino–Owari earthquake, with the second station building being constructed a year later. The second station was also wooden, but was twice as large. The station was connected with the modern-day Kansai Main Line (Note: The Kansai Main Line was officially named in 1909) when the Kansai Railways extended the line to the station on 24 May 1895. Kansai Railway is later nationalized in 1909. The Chūō Main Line reached the station from Tajimi on 25 July 1900, which added a new track to the station. After Kansai Railway's nationalization, two tracks and a platform were newly constructed to the west of the Tōkaidō Main Line platforms in 1913. The station saw an increase in both passenger and freight resulting from the completion of the Chūō Main Line and the duplication of the Tōkaidō Main Line, along with service on the modern route via Atami commencing on 1 December 1934. These events made the operation of the station too complex. As the expansion of the station was unfeasible in its original location, plans arose to relocate the station north, locating the new terminal of Meitetsu and the modern-day Kintetsu Railway near the relocated station. The construction of the third station building and the elevation of nearby tracks by viaducts began in August 1934, and opened on 1 February 1937. The freight operation in the station was also completely relegated to the now-defunct Sasashima Station opened at the same time. The third station building, made of reinforced concrete, had seven floors, one of which was located underground. The Kansai Rapid Electric Railway, the predecessor of Kintetsu, opened what is now the Kintetsu Nagoya Station on 26 June 1938. The station was located underground, adjacent to the Nagoya Station. The underground Meitetsu Nagoya Station was opened on 12 August 1941, by the Meitetsu, partially using the vacant space left following the relocation of Nagoya Station.

=== Post–war ===
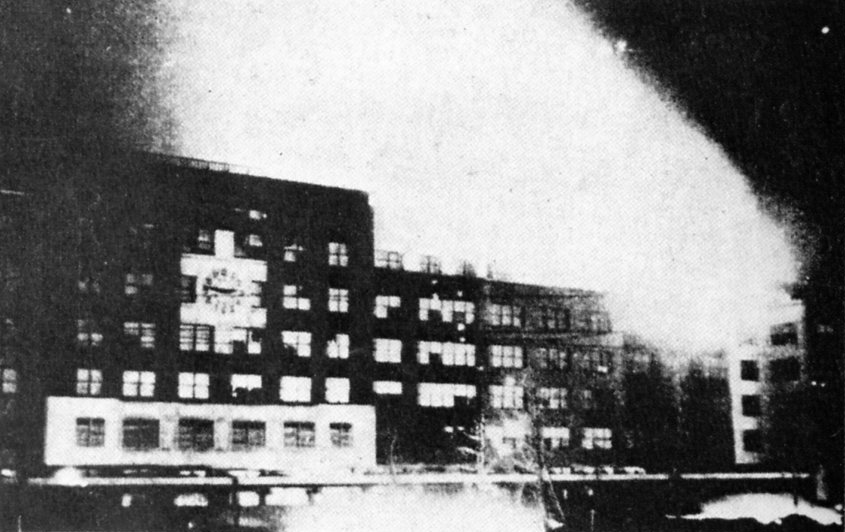
The third station building on fire.

The third station building caught fire and was almost completely destroyed by the bombing of Nagoya during the Pacific War, although it was later repaired and remained in use until 1993. After the Surrender of Japan, the Allied occupation forces occupied a large part of the station, such as the waiting room, and restricted access to it, establishing a Railway Transportation Office (RTO) on 30 September 1945. Around this period, orphaned children and other homeless survivors of the war found shelter in the station. The station came under the operation of the Japanese National Railways (JNR) upon its establishment on 1 June 1949. The occupation of the station and the rolling stock ended upon the signing of the Treaty of San Francisco. The Nagoya Municipal Subway, which had been planned since May 1936, opened the first section of the Higashiyama Line between the station and Sakae on 15 November 1957, after many route revisions. The station was incorporated into the Tokaido Shinkansen upon its opening on 1 October 1964. From 1964 to 1972, its platforms were extended, and new railway lines were built to better facilitate the operation of trains. The operator of the station changed to the Central Japan Railway Company (JR Central) in 1987, when the JNR was privatized and split.

Controversies arose when the station was skipped by one of the Nozomi services until 1997, when it was incorporated into the Tokaido Shinkansen. The third station building was replaced with the JR Central Towers, which opened on 4 December 1999. For the construction of the JR Central Towers, the platforms numbered 0 and 1 were put out of use, later being replaced by the new platforms numbered 1 and 2. On 6 October 2004, the West Nagoya freight branch was converted into the passenger-only Aonami Line, which terminates at the station. Station numbering was introduced to the sections of the Chuo, Kansai, and Tōkaidō Main Lines operated JR Central in March 2018; Nagoya Station was assigned station number CF00 for the Chuo Main Line, CJ00 for the Kansai Main Line, and CA68 for the Tōkaidō Main Line. As of 2025, the Nagoya Station is served by the Aonami Line is assigned station number AN01. The Nagoya Municipal Subway station is assigned H08 and S02, each for the Higashiyama Line and the Sakura-dōri Line.

Nagoya Station is planned to be the Chūō Shinkansen's western terminus, with construction underway since 17 December 2014. The line's two island platforms and four tracks will be located 30 to 40 meters underground.

== Station layout ==
=== JR Central ===
The six island platforms of the Tōkaidō Main Line, Chuo Line, and Kansai Line are situated in the eastern part of the station (the side where JR Central Towers are located) and serve 12 tracks. Two island platforms for the Tokaido Shinkansen are located in the western part and serve four tracks. To allow for construction of the Chūō Shinkansen, platform 2 was temporarily closed in 2017. It has since returned to use, with platform 1's operations being suspended instead. The latter is currently used for events on occasions. The Tebasaki chain Sekai No Yamachan operated a store on platform 1 for two months, in 2023. Platforms 1 to 10 have Kishimen stands, all operated by Japan Travel Service.

The JR Central Towers, which were completed in 1999 and opened in May 2000, serve as the main station building. JR Central spent approximately 200,000 million yen for the construction works. The buildings consist of twin towers with 51 and 53 floors, respectively. With a floor area of 420,000 square metres, it was once listed as the largest station building in the world by the Guinness World Records in 2002. However, the station no longer holds this record, with the "largest station building" record itself being abolished.

1/2	■ Tōkaidō Main Line	for Toyohashi and Taketoyo
3/4	■ Tōkaidō Main Line	for Toyohashi and Taketoyo (through trains to the Taketoyo Line and Home Liner) for Gifu and Ōgaki (Home Liner)
4	■ Tōkaidō Main Line	Shirasagi limited express for Tsuruga
5/6	■ Tōkaidō Main Line	for Gifu and Ōgaki
7/8	■ Chūō Main Line	for Tajimi and Nakatsugawa (local and rapid trains)
10	■ Chūō Main Line	for Tajimi and Nakatsugawa (Central Liner, Home Liner); Shinano limited express for Matsumoto and Nagano
11	■ Tōkaidō Main Line	Hida limited express for Gero, Takayama and Toyama
11	■ Chūō Main Line	for Tajimi and Nakatsugawa (some trains)
11	■ Kansai Main Line	for Kuwana, Yokkaichi and Kameyama (some local trains)
12	■ Kansai Main Line	for Kuwana, Yokkaichi and Kameyama; Nanki limited express for Matsusaka, Shingū and Kii-Katsuura
13	■ Kansai Main Line	for Kuwana, Yokkaichi and Kameyama rapid Mie for Matsusaka, Iseshi and Toba
14/15	■ Tōkaidō Shinkansen	for Shizuoka and Tokyo
16/17	■ Tōkaidō Shinkansen	for Shin-Osaka and Hakata

=== Aonami Line ===
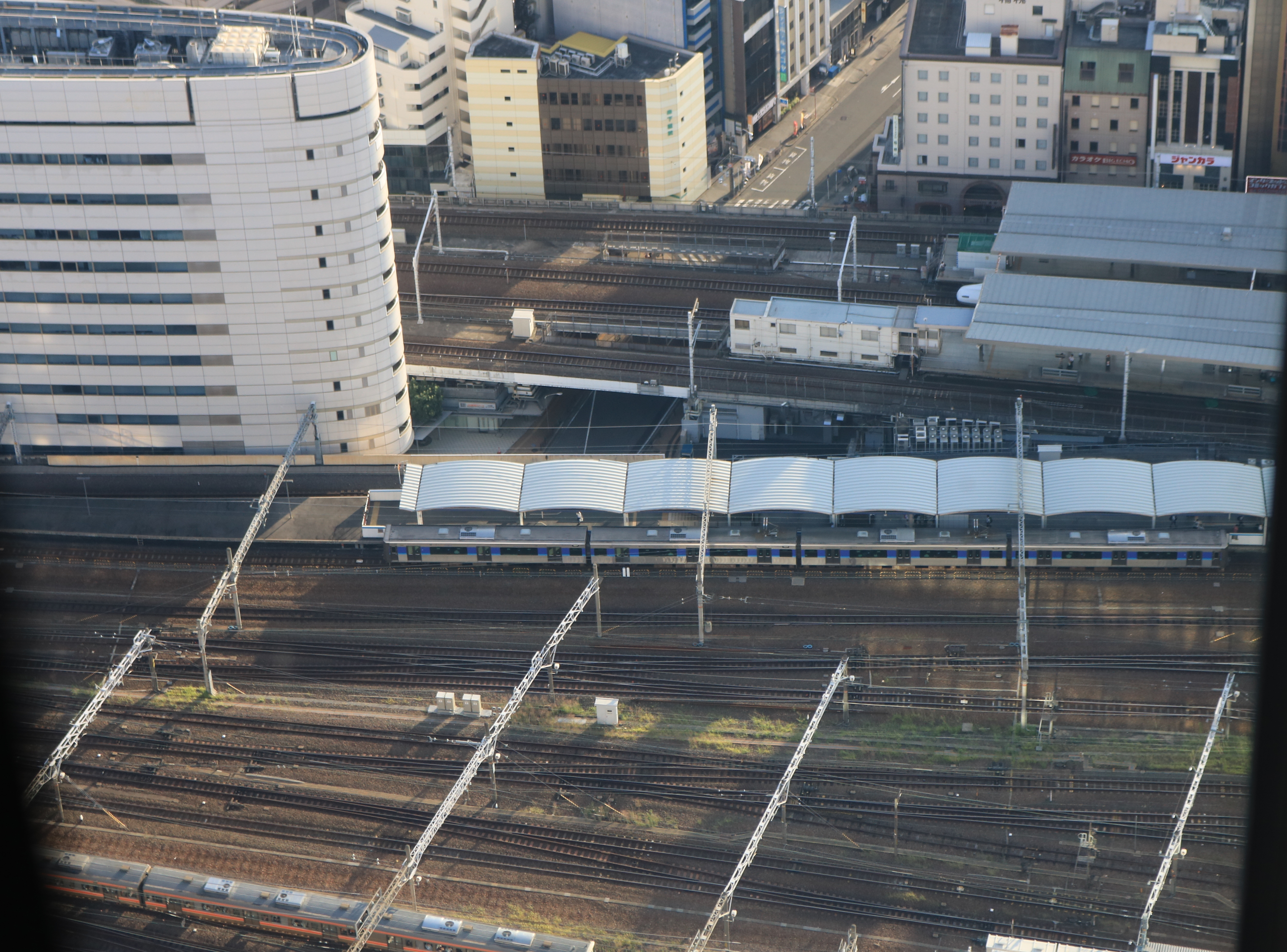
The station platform viewed from the Midland Square, a nearby skyscraper

The northern terminus of the Aonami Line is situated to the west of the JR Central Lines, adjacent to the Sasashima-raibu Station. The elevated station has an island platform serving two tracks with platform gates.

1/2	■ Aonami Line	for Arako and Kinjō-futō

=== Nagoya Municipal Subway ===
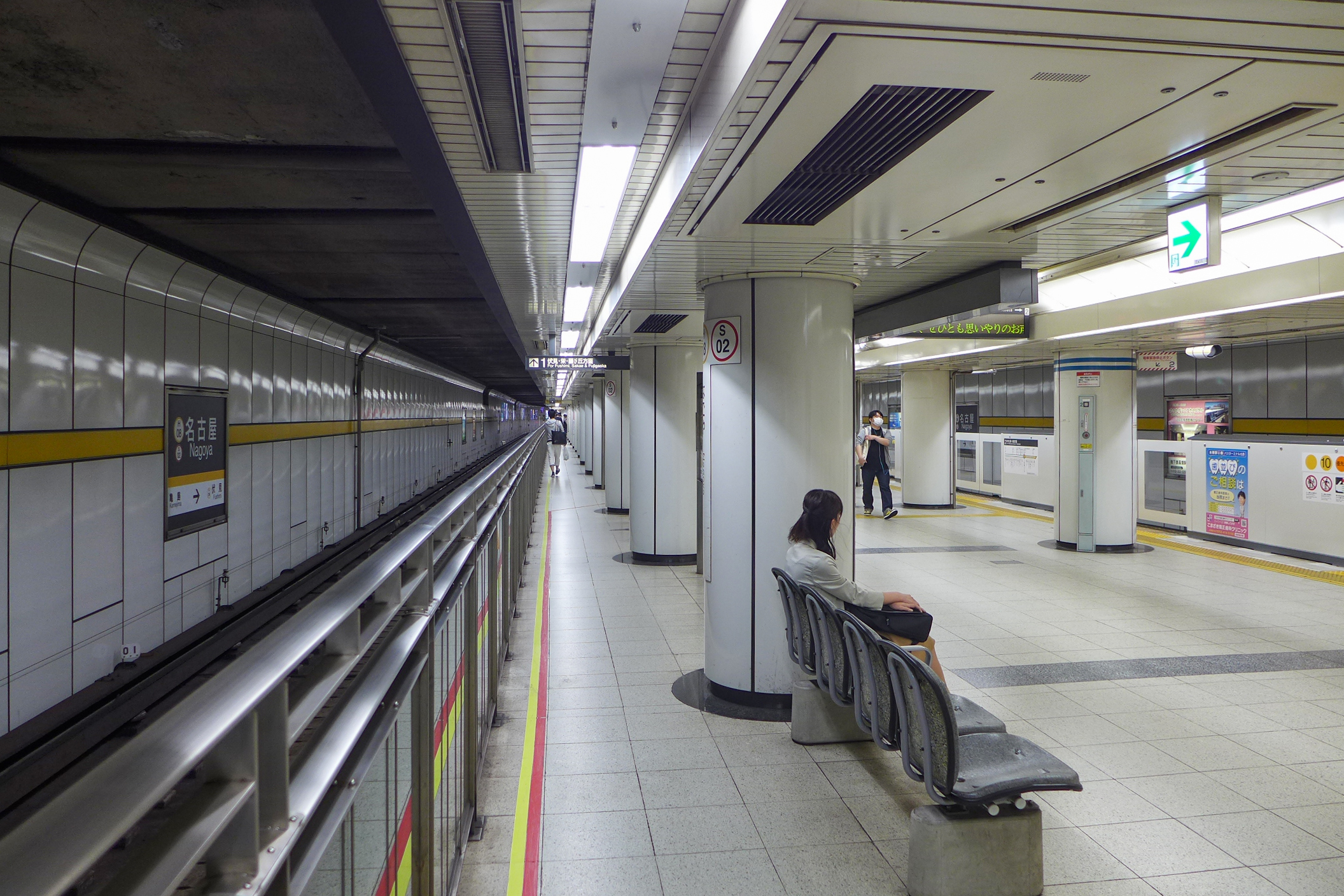
The Higashiyama Line platform of the station in 2017

An island platform for the Sakura-dori Line serving two tracks extends east to west under the central concourse of JR Nagoya Station. The platform is fenced with platform gates. An island platform for the Higashiyama Line serving two tracks is located south to north under underground city Meieki Chikagai (Meichika), in the east of JR Nagoya Station. The southern part of the platform is used by the trains for Fujigaoka, and the northern one by trains for Takabata.

1	Higashiyama Line	for Sakae, Higashiyama Koen, and Fujigaoka
2	Higashiyama Line	for Nakamura Koen and Takabata
3	Sakura-dori Line	for Imaike, Aratamabashi, Nonami, and Tokushige
4	Sakura-dori Line	to Taiko-dori

== Services ==
=== Passenger service ===
The JR Central-owned station is directly served by five railway lines, four limited express trains (Shinano, Nanki, Hida, Shirasagi) and an additional named rapid service, Mie. The station is also serviced by multiple Home Liner trains. As of 2025, services on the Tōkaidō Main Line serve the station from 5:29 a.m. to 0:02 a.m. The station also services the Tokaido Shinkansen. All three service types stop on the station, and serve the station from 6:20 a.m. to 10:58 p.m. The Hida and Nanki provides service to the Takayama Main Line and the Kisei Main Line, while Shirasagi and Shinano limited express services run on the Tōkaidō and Chūō Lines.

Trains on the Nagoya Municipal Subway service the station from 5:32 a.m. to 0:28 a.m. For the Aonami Line, trains service the station from 5:30 a.m. to 11:58 p.m., with intervals of 15 to 30 minutes.

=== Freight service ===
The freight-only branch Nagoya-Minato Line used to carry goods such as coal, rice, flour, and wood materials. The line was abolished under the control of Japan Freight Railway Company on 1 April 2024. In the line's last year, just three return trips on Tuesday, Thursday and Saturday used the line.

=== Bus service ===
The Nagoya City Transportation Bureau operates a bus terminal north of the JR Central Towers, which has 11 boarding spots, serving 22 routes. Outside the bus terminal, two boarding areas for the Nagoya City-operated buses are located in front of the Meitetsu Department Store. The JR Tokai Bus Company also operates highway bus services departing or arriving near the station.
