= Taiko-dori Station =

Metro station in Nagoya, Japan

Coordinates: 35.1676°N 136.8731°E

S01 Taiko-dori Station 太閤通駅
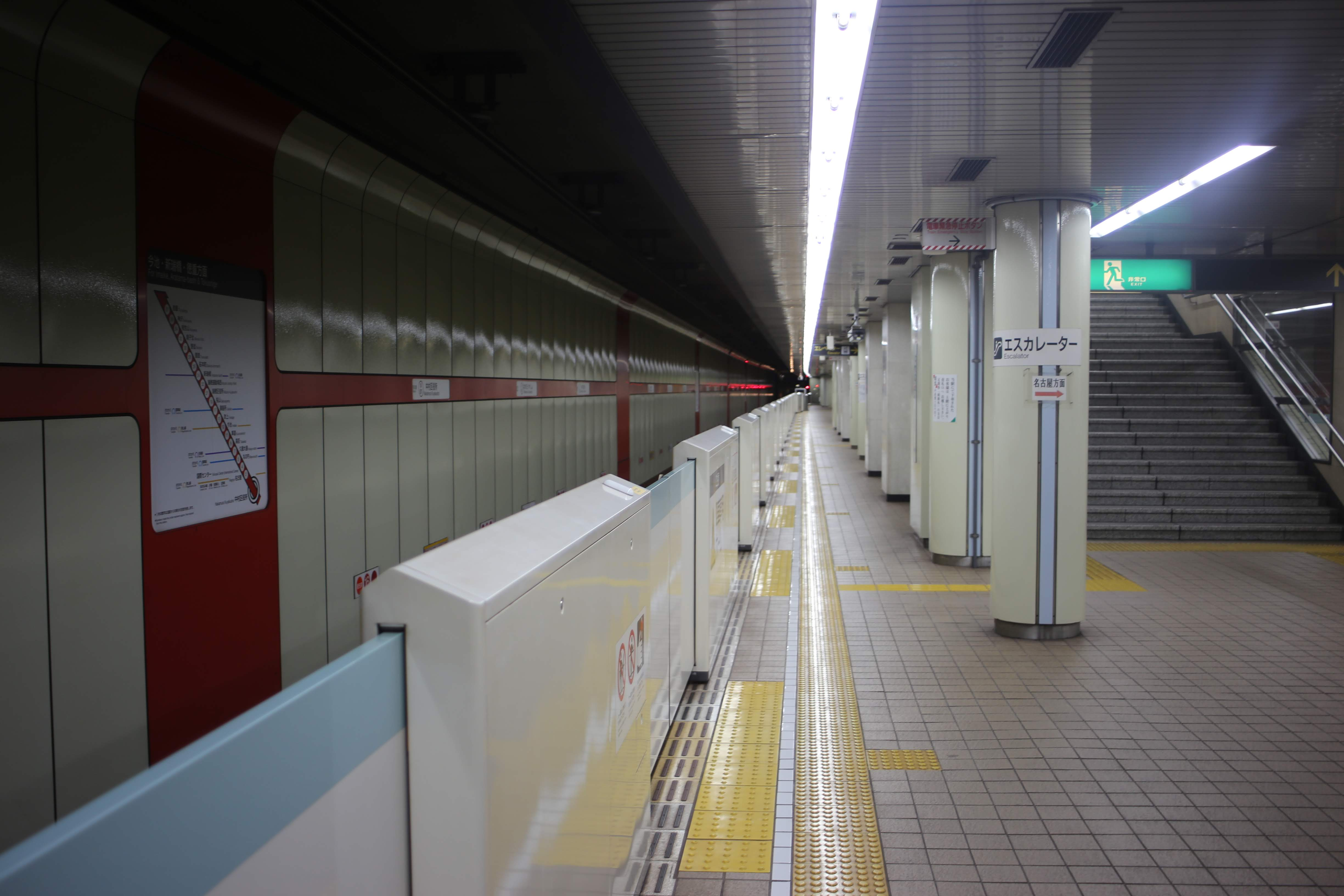

General information
- Location: Taikōtōri 3-27-3, Nakamura, Nagoya, Aichi （名古屋市中村区太閤通三丁目27-3） Japan
- System: Nagoya Municipal Subway station
- Operator: Transportation Bureau City of Nagoya
- Line: Sakura-dōri Line
- Connections: Bus terminal

Other information
- Station code: S01

History
- Opened: 10 September 1989; 37 years ago
- Former names: Nakamuara Kuyakusho (1989-2023)

Passengers
- 2007: 5,152 daily

Services
Preceding station	Nagoya Municipal Subway	Following station
Terminus	Sakura-dōri Line	Nagoya S02 towards Tokushige
Location

Taiko-dori Station (太閤通駅, Taikō-dōri-eki; lit. "Taiko Street") is a train station in Nakamura-ku, Nagoya, Aichi Prefecture, Japan.

It was opened on 10 September 1989; 37 years ago as Nakamura Kuyakusho Station (中村区役所駅). However, with the relocation of Nakamura Ward Office, the station was renamed to its present name on 4 January 2023.

The name derives from the Taikō-dōri main street, which is named after the area Taikō. This in turn is named after the taikō Toyotomi Hideyoshi, who hailed from the Owari region.

== Lines ==
- Nagoya Municipal Subway
  - Sakura-dōri Line (Station number: S01)

== Layout ==
1	■ Sakura-dōri Line	For Nagoya, Imaike, Aratama-bashi, and Tokushige
2	■ Sakura-dōri Line	Alight only
