= Tenpaku-ku =

Tenpaku 天白区
- Ward
- Tenpaku Ward
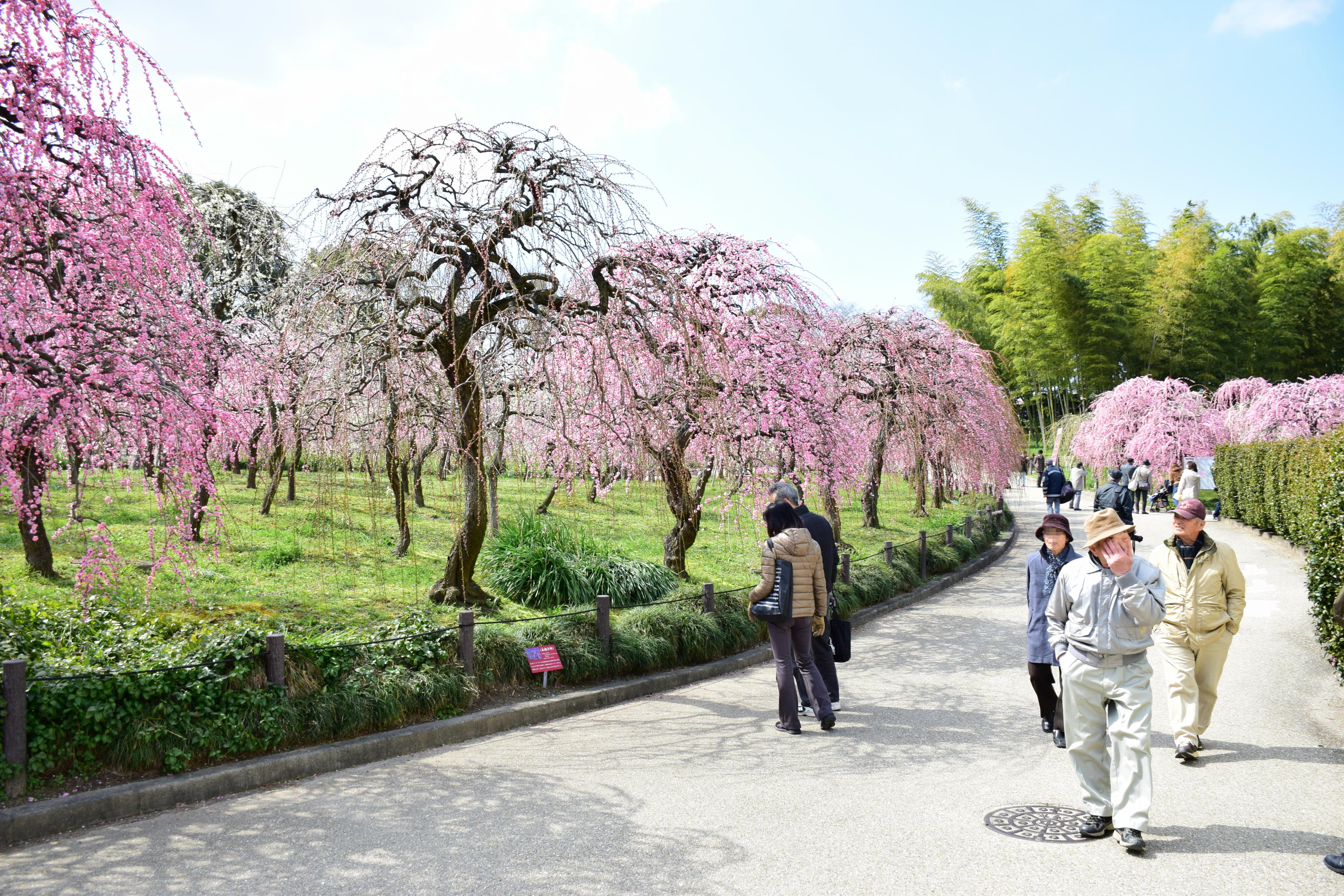
- Nagoya Agricultural Center

- Flag Seal

- Location of Tempaku-ku in Nagoya

- Coordinates: 35°07′21.9″N 136°58′30.4″E
- Country: Japan
- Region: Tōkai region Chūbu region
- Prefecture: Aichi

Area
  - Total: 21.58 km^{2} (8.33 sq mi)

Population (October 1, 2019)
  - Total: 164,522
  - Density: 7,624/km^{2} (19,750/sq mi)
- Time zone: UTC+9 (Japan Standard Time)
- Flower: Marguerite daisy
- Tree: Osmanthus fragrans
- Phone number: 052-803-1111
- Address: 2-201 Shimada, Tempaku-ku, Nagoya-shi, Aichi-ken 468-8510
- Website: Official website (in Japanese)

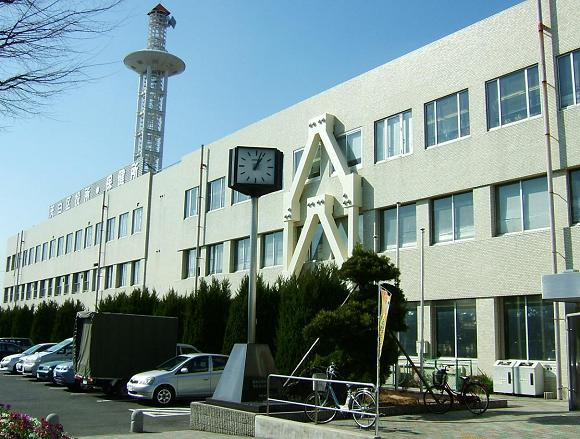
Tempaku-ku Ward Office

Tenpaku (天白区, Tenpaku-ku) is one of the 16 wards of the city of Nagoya in Aichi Prefecture, Japan. As of 1 October 2019, the ward had an estimated population of 164,522, and a population density of 7,624 persons per km². The total area was 21.58 square kilometres (8.33 sq mi).

== Geography ==
Tempaku Ward is located in eastern Nagoya city.

=== Surrounding municipalities ===
- Shōwa Ward
- Chikusa Ward
- Mizuho Ward
- Meitō Ward
- Midori Ward
- Minami Ward
- Nisshin

== History ==
The area of present Tempaku District has strong connections with the Oda clan and was a frequently battlefield in the Sengoku period. During the Edo period, it was largely part of Owari Domain under the Tokugawa shogunate. The modern village of Tempaku was established in 1906 within Aichi District. It was annexed by the city of Nagoya in 1955, becoming part of Showa District. In 1975, Showa District was divided into the new Showa District and Tempaku District.

== Education ==
- Meijo University
- Tokai Gakuen University – Nagoya campus
- Toyota Technological Institute
- Nagoya Women's University – Tempaku campus, which was closed in 2015 and integrated into Shioji Campus at Mizuho-ku (See Nagoya Women's University#History [:ja:]).

== Transportation ==
=== Railway ===
- Nagoya Municipal Subway - Tsurumai Line
  - Shiogama-guchi - Ueda - Hara - Hirabari
- Nagoya Municipal Subway - Sakura-dōri Line
  - Nonami - Naruko Kita

=== Highways ===
- Mei-Nikan Expressway
- National Route 153
- National Route 302

== Local attractions ==
- Harina Shrine (針名神社)
- Shimada Castle (島田城)
- Jigen Temple (慈眼寺)
