= Imaike Station (Nagoya) =

Metro station in Nagoya, Japan

Coordinates: 35.1699°N 136.937°E

H13 S08 Imaike Station 今池駅
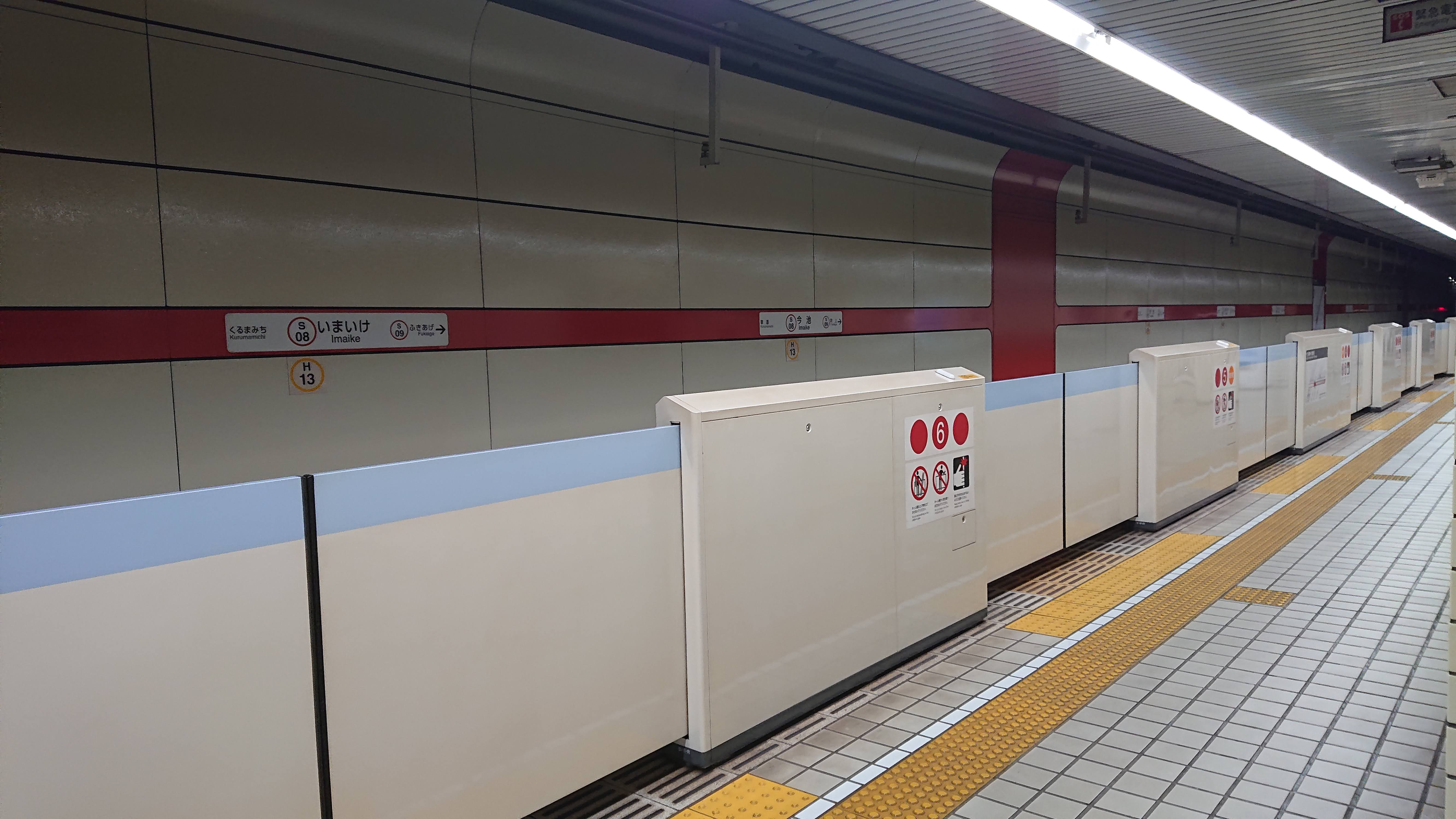

General information
- Location: Imaike 5-1, Chikusa, Nagoya, Aichi （名古屋市千種区今池五丁目1） Japan
- System: Nagoya Municipal Subway station
- Operator: Transportation Bureau City of Nagoya
- Lines: Higashiyama Line; Sakura-dōri Line
- Connections: Bus stop

Other information
- Station code: H13; S08

History
- Opened: 15 June 1960; 66 years ago

Passengers
- 2009: 20,641 daily

Services
| Preceding station | Nagoya Municipal Subway | Following station |
|---|---|---|
| Chikusa H12 towards Takabata | Higashiyama Line | Ikeshita H14 towards Fujigaoka |
| Kurumamichi S07 towards Taiko-dori | Sakura-dōri Line | Fukiage S09 towards Tokushige |
Location

Imaike Station (今池駅, Imaike-eki) is an underground metro station located in Chikusa-ku, Nagoya, Aichi Prefecture, Japan operated by the Nagoya Municipal Subway. It is an interchange station and is located 11.7 rail kilometers from the terminus of the Higashiyama Line at Takabata Station and 6.3 rail kilometers from the terminus of the Sakura-dōri Line at Taiko-dori Station.

== History ==
Imaike Station was opened on 15 June 1960 as a station on the Higashiyama Line. The Sakura-dōri Line connected to the station on 10 September 1989. The wicket gates were automated to use the Manaca smart card system from 11 February 2011. Platform screen doors were installed on the Sakura-dōri Line platform on 30 April 2011.

== Lines ==
- Nagoya Municipal Subway
  - Higashiyama Line (Station number: H14)
  - Sakura-dōri Line (Station number: S08)

== Layout ==
Imaike Station has two underground island platforms.

=== Platforms ===
| 1 | ■ Higashiyama Line | For Higashiyama Kōen and Fujigaoka |
| 2 | ■ Higashiyama Line | For Sakae, Nagoya, and Takabata |
| 3 | ■ Sakura-dōri Line | For Aratama-bashi and Tokushige |
| 4 | ■ Sakura-dōri Line | For Nagoya and Taiko-dori |
