= Nagoya City Transportation Bureau =

Government agency in Nagoya, Japan

Transportation Bureau City of Nagoya

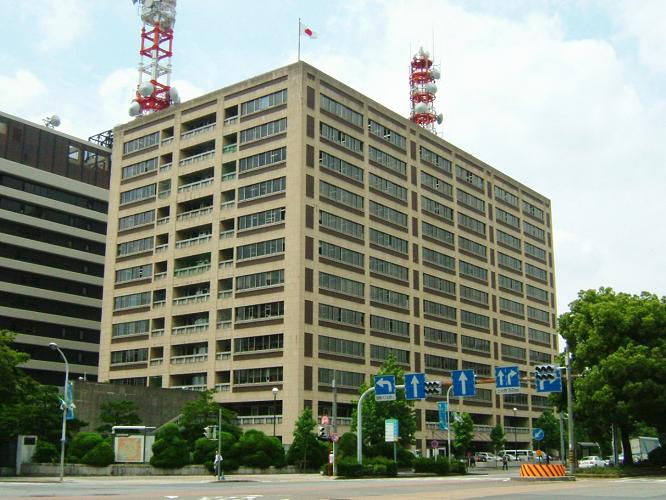
- Nagoya City Transportation Bureau headquarters
- Native name: 名古屋市交通局
- Romanized name: Nagoya-shi Kōtsūkyoku
- Type: Transportation authority
- Industry: Transportation
- Founded: 1 August 1922
- Headquarters: Nagoya, Japan
- Website: Official website

Monsho; also former logo used until November 2022

The Nagoya City Transportation Bureau, officially the Transportation Bureau City of Nagoya (名古屋市交通局, Nagoya-shi Kōtsūkyoku) is a municipal government agency responsible for public transport in Nagoya, Japan. The organization operates subways and buses. It was founded in 1922, as an operator of Nagoya City Tram bought from Nagoya Electric Railroad, the current Nagoya Railroad. The bureau sells Manaca, replacing the older Tranpass system.

== Transportation ==
- Currently operational
  - Nagoya Municipal Subway
  - Nagoya Municipal Bus
- Discontinued
  - Nagoya City Tram
  - Nagoya Municipal Trolleybus
  - Higashiyama Park Monorail
    - Once operated by Association of the Nagoya City Transportation Bureau (名古屋市交通局協力会, Nagoya-shi Kōtsūkyoku Kyōryokukai), an affiliated organization of the bureau.
