= Horita Station (Nagoya Municipal Subway) =

Metro station in Nagoya, Japan

M25 Horita Station 堀田駅
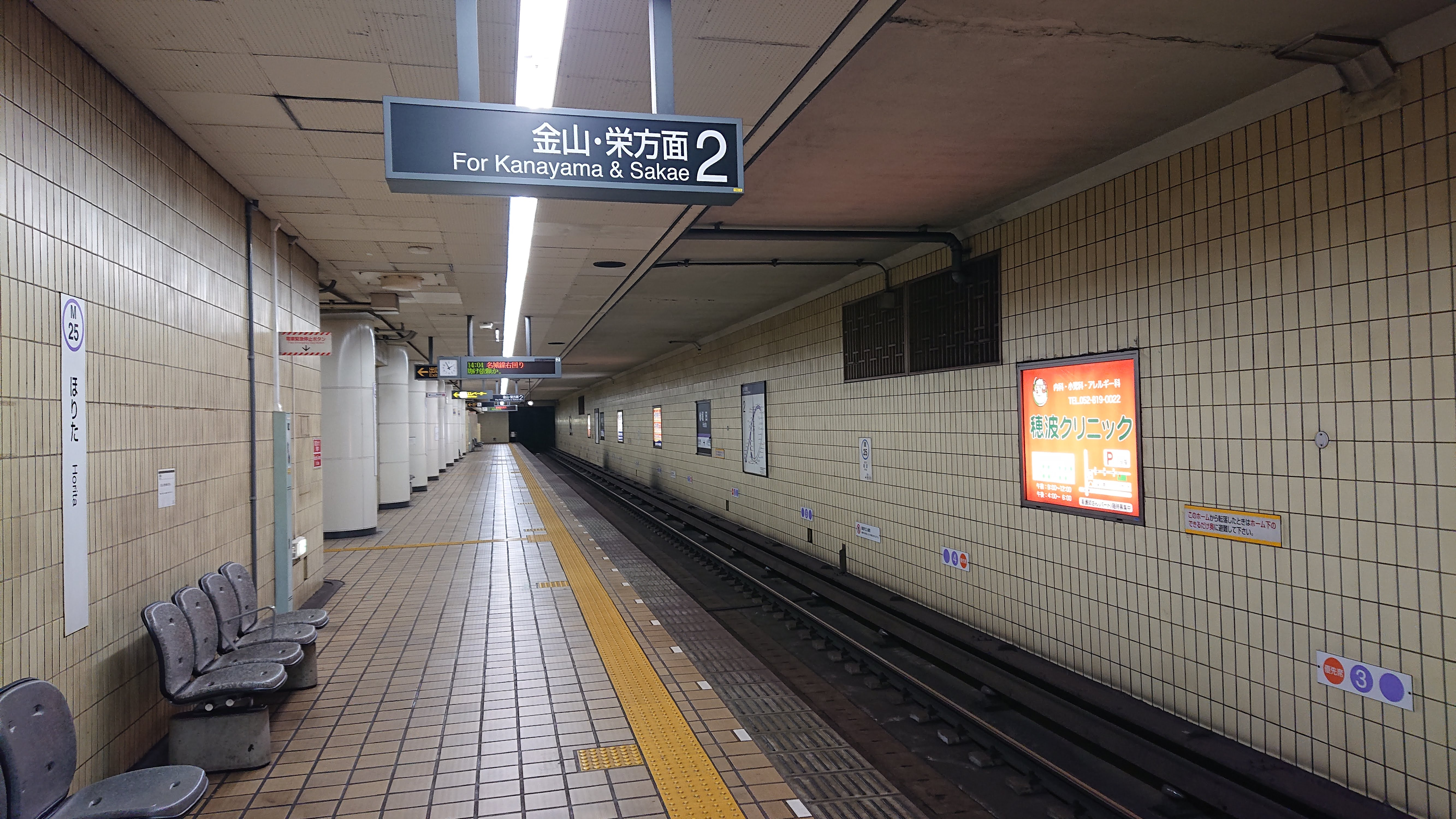
- Horita Station platform in June 2019

General information
- Location: 25-18 Naeshiro, Mizuho, Nagoya, Aichi （名古屋市瑞穂区苗代町25-18） Japan
- Coordinates: 35.1165°N 136.922°E
- System: Nagoya Municipal Subway station
- Operator: Transportation Bureau City of Nagoya
- Line: Meijō Line
- Connections: Bus stop

Other information
- Station code: M25

History
- Opened: 30 March 1974; 52 years ago

Passengers
- 2009: 6,818 daily

Services
Preceding station	Nagoya Municipal Subway	Following station
Myōon-dōri M24 anticlockwise	Meijō Line	Atsuta Jingu Temma-cho M26 clockwise
Location

Horita Station (堀田駅, Horita-eki) is an underground metro station located in Mizuho-ku, Nagoya, Aichi Prefecture, Japan operated by the Nagoya Municipal Subway's Meijō Line. It is located 22.2 kilometers from the terminus of the Meijō Line at Kanayama Station.

== History ==
Horita Station was opened on 30 March 1974.

== Lines ==
- Nagoya Municipal Subway
  - Meijō Line (Station number: M25)

== Layout ==
Horita Station has a single underground island platform.

=== Platforms ===
1	■ Meijō Line	For Aratama-bashi and Yagoto
2	■ Meijō Line	For Kanayama and Sakae
