= Ichirō Hirosawa =

Japanese politician (born 1963)

- Hirosawa Ichirō (広沢 一郎)
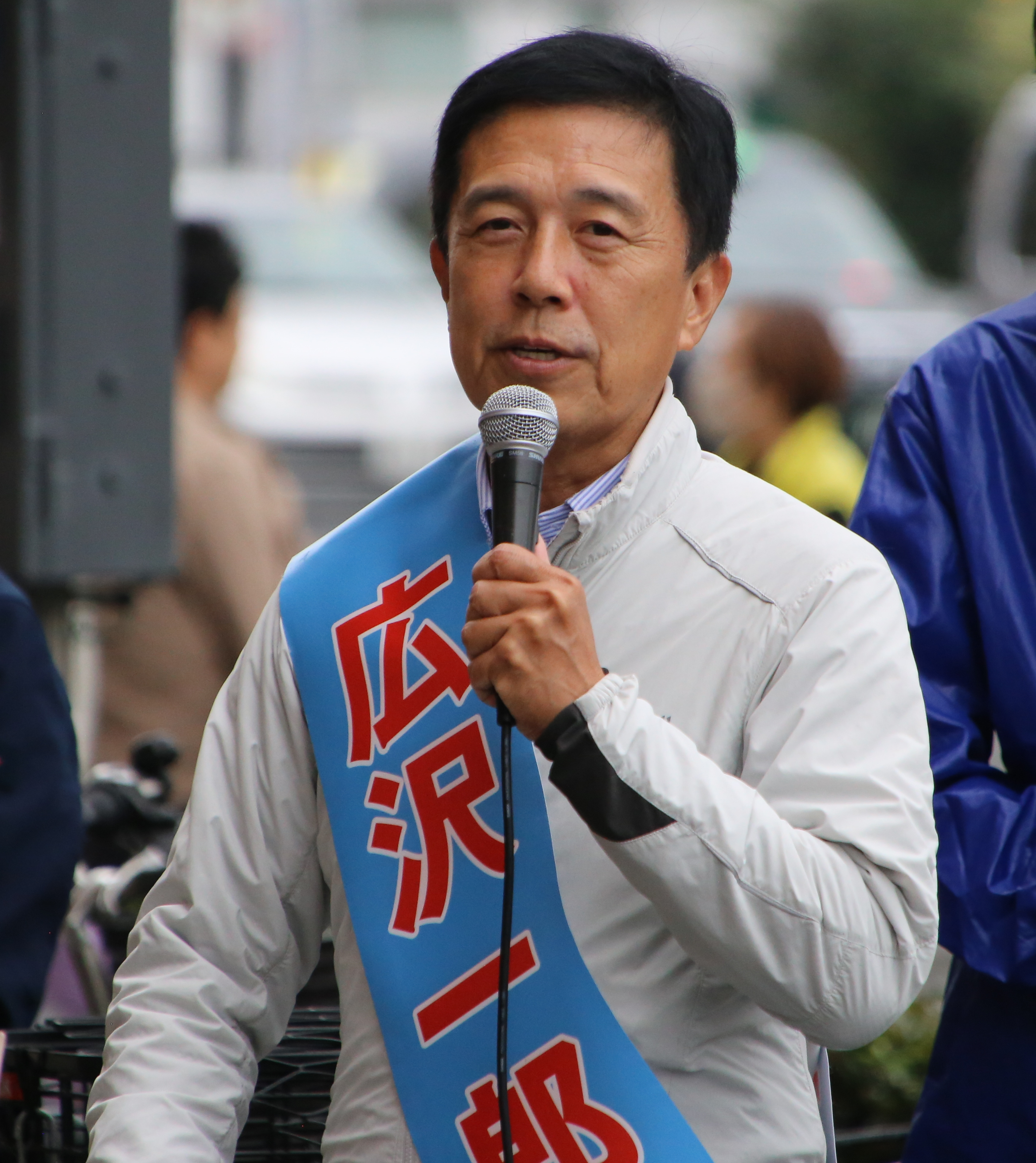
- Hirosawa delivering an election speech, 2024

Mayor of Nagoya
- Incumbent
- Assumed office November 25, 2024
- Preceded by: Takashi Kawamura

Member of the Aichi Prefectural Assembly
- In office 2011–2014 Serving with Taro Kawashima
- Preceded by: Koji Takagi
- Succeeded by: Koji Takagi
- Constituency: Mizuho-ku

Deputy Mayor of Nagoya
- In office November 17, 2017 – December 15, 2021
- Mayor: Takashi Kawamura
- Preceded by: Teruo Shinkai
- Succeeded by: Toshinori Matsuo

Personal details
- Born: December 27, 1963 (age 62) Mizuho-ku, Nagoya, Aichi Prefecture, Japan
- Party: Genzei Nippon (since 2011)
- Other political affiliations: Conservative Party of Japan (2023–2025); Japan Innovation Party (2022)
- Education: Keio University (BS)

Ichirō Hirosawa (Japanese: 広沢 一郎, Hepburn: Hirosawa Ichirō; born December 27, 1963) is a Japanese businessman and politician who is the mayor of Nagoya since 2024. Born in Mizuho-ku, Nagoya, he previously worked as a producer and CEO for Magnolia kabushiki-gaisha before entering politics in 2011.

Hirosawa was a member of the Aichi Prefectural Assembly for Mizuho-ku from 2011 to 2014 alongside Taro Kawashima. He lost elections for the House of Representatives for Aichi 1st district in the 2014 and for the House of Councillors for Aichi at-large district in 2022. He was later appointed as Deputy Mayor for Nagoya from 2017 to 2021.

A member of the Aichi-based regional party Genzei Nippon, Hirosawa served as deputy general-secretary for the party from 2011 to 2023. He also served as the deputy general-secretary for Conservative Party of Japan from 2023 to 2024.

== Early life and ventures ==
Hirosawa was born on December 27, 1963, in Mizuho-ku, Nagoya, Aichi Prefecture. He attended elementary school at Nagoya Municipal Yomei Elementary School. He attends middle school at Nagoya Municipal Shioji Middle School and attends Aichi Prefectural Zuiryo High School at the age of 18. He graduated from Keio University's Faculty of Economics in March 1986.

After graduating, he worked for Brother Industries where he was involved in the sales of TAKERU software. He founded and become the CEO of Magnolia kabushiki-gaisha in April 1998 where they develop games for Windows. On May 6, 2006, he operated Bonanza, a computer shogi program, during the 16th World Computer Shogi Championship. The program won the championship and became the first-ever first-time winner in the competition.

== Political career ==
=== Early political career (2011–2024) ===
Hirosawa decided to run for the Aichi Prefectural Assembly in 2011 for Genzei Nippon as a representative for Mizuho-ku. He won after garnering 11,420 votes, and served alongside Taro Kawashima. After serving, Hirosawa decided to run for the House of Representatives for Aichi 1st district in the 2014 Japanese general election but lost to Hiromichi Kumada, garnering 18,343 votes and placing fourth. On November 17, 2017, he was appointed by former Nagoya mayor Takashi Kawamura as deputy mayor of Nagoya. His term lasted until December 15, 2021, when his term was expired.

On March 22, 2022, Nagoya City Council rejected a proposal by Kawamura to appoint Hirosawa as the city's Superintendent of Education. All but the members of Genzei Nippon opposed the proposal, citing concerns that it could "undermine the political neutrality of education" due to him being the deputy secretary-general for Genzei Nippon. Hirosawa tried to run for the House of Councillors election for Aichi at-large district in July under Japan Innovation Party, but lost by 40,000 to Takae Itō. He placed fifth, receiving 351,840 votes. In November 2022, Hirosawa left the Japan Innovation Party. He was appointed as the secretary-general of the Conservative Party of Japan on October 17, 2023.

Upon the resignation of Kawamura as mayor of Nagoya on September 31, 2024, a special mayoral election was held in Nagoya. Hirosawa was nominated as the candidate for the Conservative Party of Japan and Genzei Nippon, but decided to run as an independent. He won the election, garnering 392,519 votes, beating former House of Councilors member Kohei Otsuka.

=== Mayor of Nagoya (2024–present) ===
During a regular press conference on June 30, 2025, Hirosawa collapsed on the podium and was hospitalized for observation. The doctor in charge of him said that there were no abnormalities in his blood pressure and that it was likely caused by stress and fatigue.

On August 7, 2025, he resigned from his position as Nagoya branch chairman after announcing his plans to improve relations with Nanjing. Kawamura, the city's former mayor, made denialist statements about the Nanjing Massacre. He later resigned as member of the Conservative Party of Japan on October 8 following Kawamura's resignation to the party.

== Electoral history ==
Year	Position	Constituency	Party	Vote	%	Result	
Year	Position	Constituency	Party	Vote	%	Result	Place
2011	Aichi Prefectural Assembly	Mizuho-ku	Genzei Nippon	11,420	-	Won	1st
2014	House of Representatives	Aichi 1st	Genzei Nippon	18,343	10.7	Lost	4th
2022	House of Councillors	Aichi at-large	Ishin	351,840	11.36	Lost	5th
2024	Mayor of Nagoya	(at-large)	Independent	392,519	53.4	Won	1st

Political offices
Preceded by Takashi Kawamura	Mayor of Nagoya; November 25, 2024	Incumbent
