= 2024 Nagoya mayoral election =

- 24 November 2024
- Turnout: 39.63% (▼2.49pp)
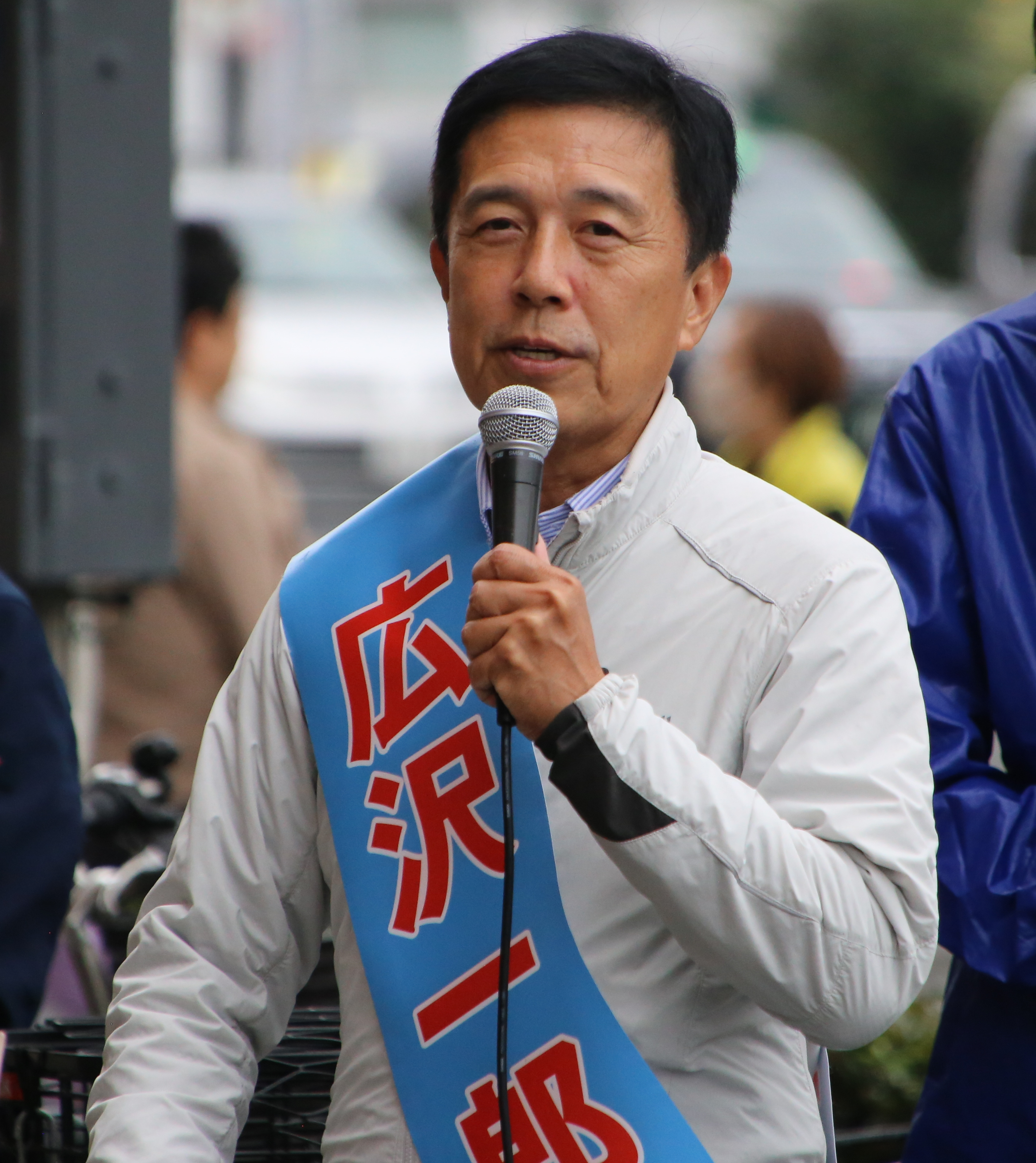

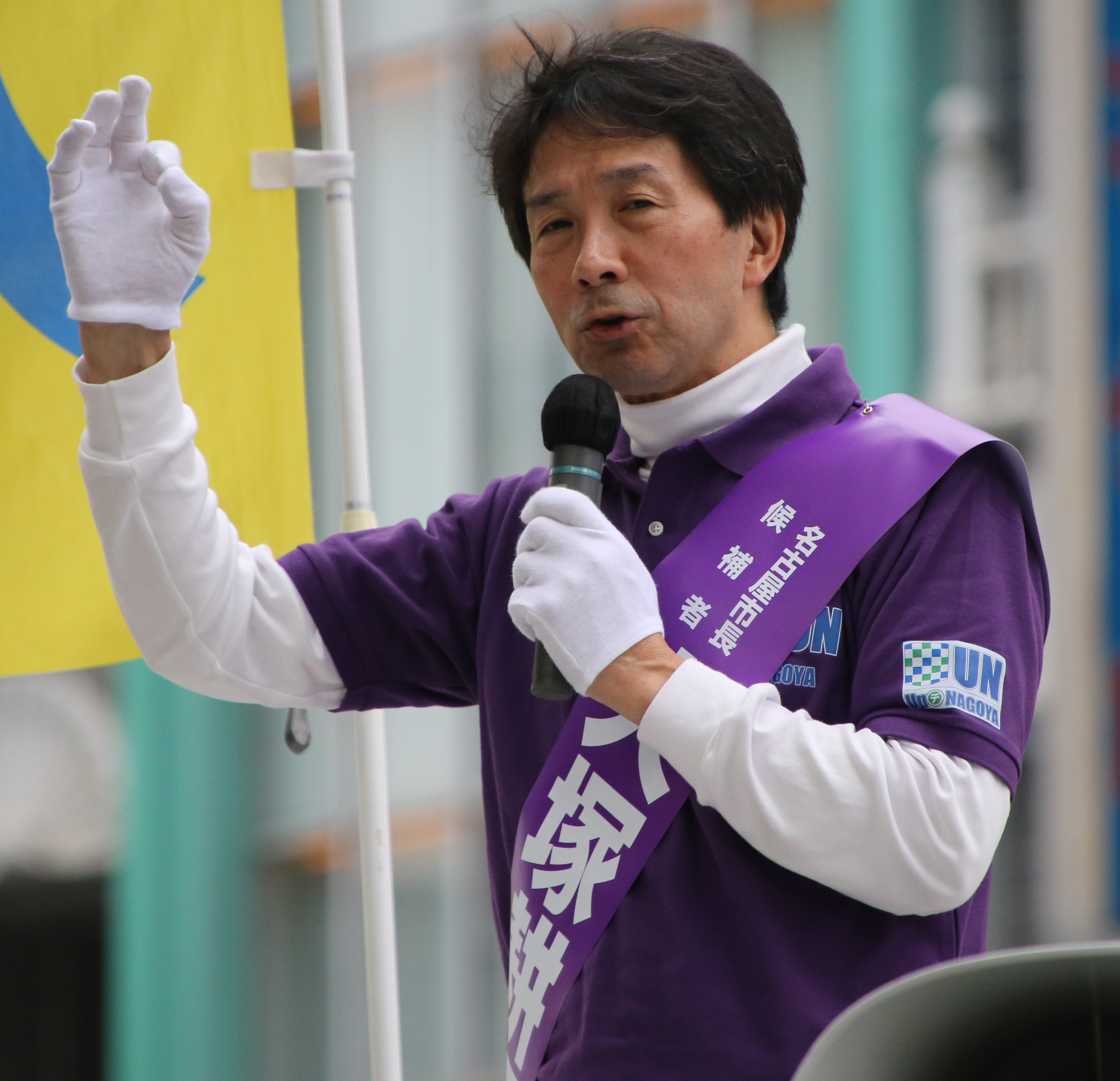

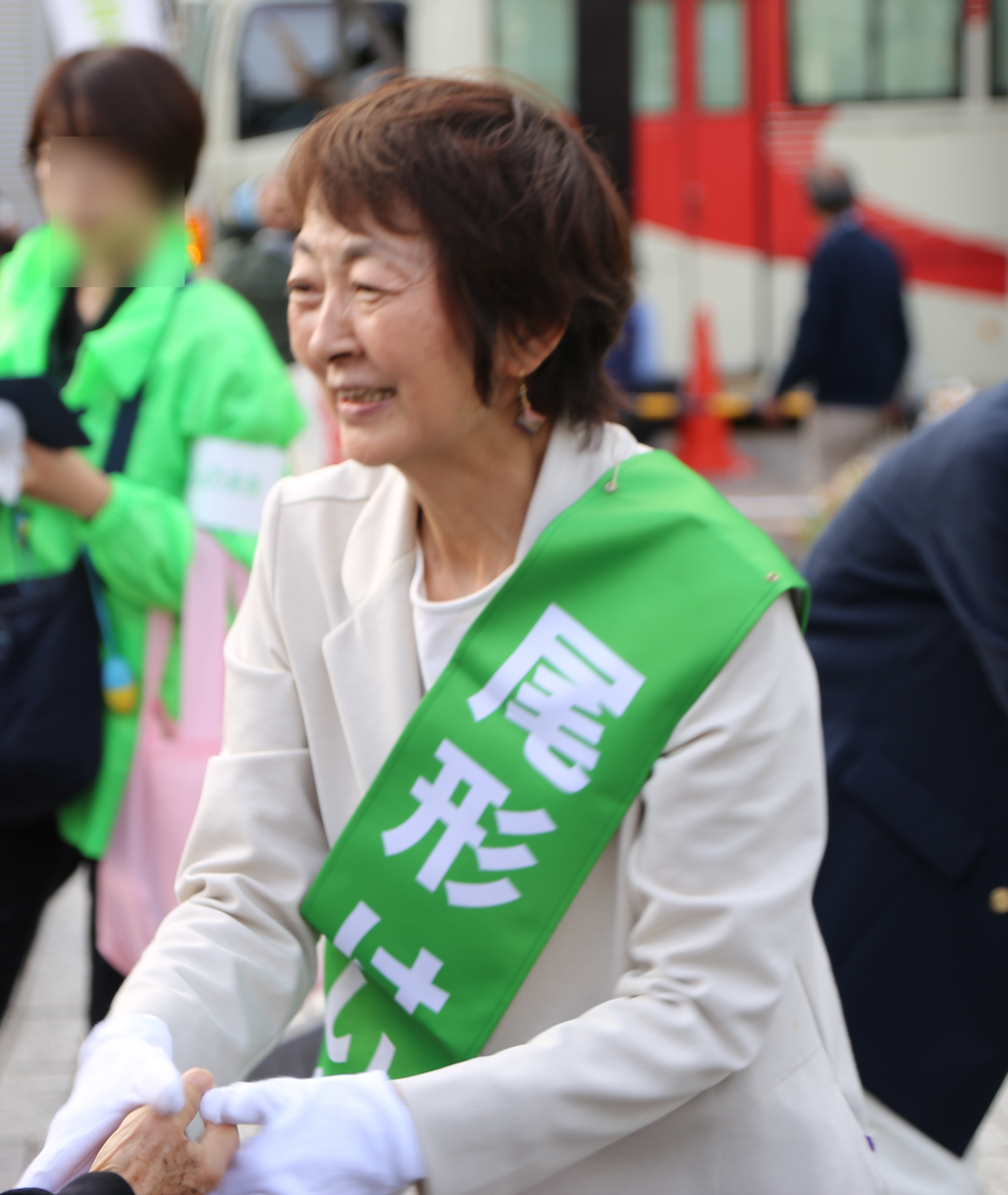
Candidate	Ichiro Hirosawa	Kohei Otsuka	Keiko Ogata
Party	Independent	Independent	Independent
Popular vote	392,519	261,425	53,622
Percentage	53.43%	35.58%	7.30%
Supported by	CPJ, Genzei Nippon	LDP, CDP, Komei, DPP	JCP, Greens
- Election results by wards
Mayor before election
Takashi Kawamura
Independent
Elected mayor
Ichiro Hirosawa
Independent

The 2024 Nagoya mayoral election was held on 24 November 2024, to elect the mayor of Nagoya, Aichi Prefecture, Japan because of the resignation of Takashi Kawamura to run for the 2024 general election.

Ichiro Hirosawa, who is a close aide of Kawamura, was elected for the first time.

== Background ==
=== Kawamura's resignation ===
In a press conference on 1 October 2024, incumbent Takashi Kawamura (Leader of the regional party Genzei Nippon, Co-Leader of the CPJ) announced his intention to run for the next general election scheduled for 27 October 2024, and submitted a resignation to the Nagoya City Council on 9 October. However, Nagoya City Council refused.

Kawamura reported his candidacy in the general election on 15 October. As he retired (automatically lost his job) as mayor of Nagoya pursuant to Article 90 of the Public Offices Election Act, the mayoral election was held about five months earlier than if he served until the expiration of his term of office.

=== Parties' endorsement ===
LDP

LDP's Aichi Confederation decided to nominate Toshiaki Yokoi, a LDP Nagoya city council member, as its candidate, but gave up Yokoi’s candidacy at the LDP headquarters' request and decided to endorse Kohei Otsuka.

== Candidates ==
A total of 7 candidates registered candidacies for the election.

Name	Age	Party	Title
Toshimitsu Ota （太田敏充）	76	Independent	Former office worker
Ichiro Hirosawa （広沢一郎）	60	Independent (Note: endorsed by CPJ, Genzei Nippon.)	Former Deputy Mayor of Nagoya
Noboru Mizutani （水谷昇）	61	Independent	Former travel agency president
Hideki Fuwa （不破英紀）	64	Independent	Former university lecturer
Yoshiaki Suzuki （鈴木慶明）	85	Independent	Former professor of Local Autonomy College
Kohei Otsuka （大塚耕平）	65	Independent (Note: endorsed by LDP, CDP, Komei, DPP.)	Former member of the House of Councillors
Keiko Ogata （尾形慶子）	67	Independent	Co-leader of Tōkai branch of Greens Japan

== Results ==
As a result of the vote counting, Hirosawa won a landslide victory by about 130,000 votes over Otsuka, the runner-up. The results shocked established political parties and made clear the public's support for the succession of Kawamura’s mayorlty, which Hirosawa had proposed.

Nagoya mayoral election 24 November 2024
Party	Candidate	Votes	%	±%
Independent	Ichiro Hirosawa	392,519	53.43%	N/A
Independent	Kohei Otsuka	261,425	35.58%	N/A
Independent	Keiko Ogata	53,622	7.30%	N/A
Independent	Noboru Mizutani	12,492	1.70%	N/A
Independent	Toshimitsu Ota	8,178	1.11%	N/A
Independent	Yoshiaki Suzuki	3,454	0.47%	N/A
Independent	Hideki Fuwa	2,973	0.40%	N/A
