= Mizuho Kuyakusho Station =

Metro station in Nagoya, Japan

Coordinates: 35.1316°N 136.9344°E

S12 Mizuho Kuyakusho Station 瑞穂区役所駅
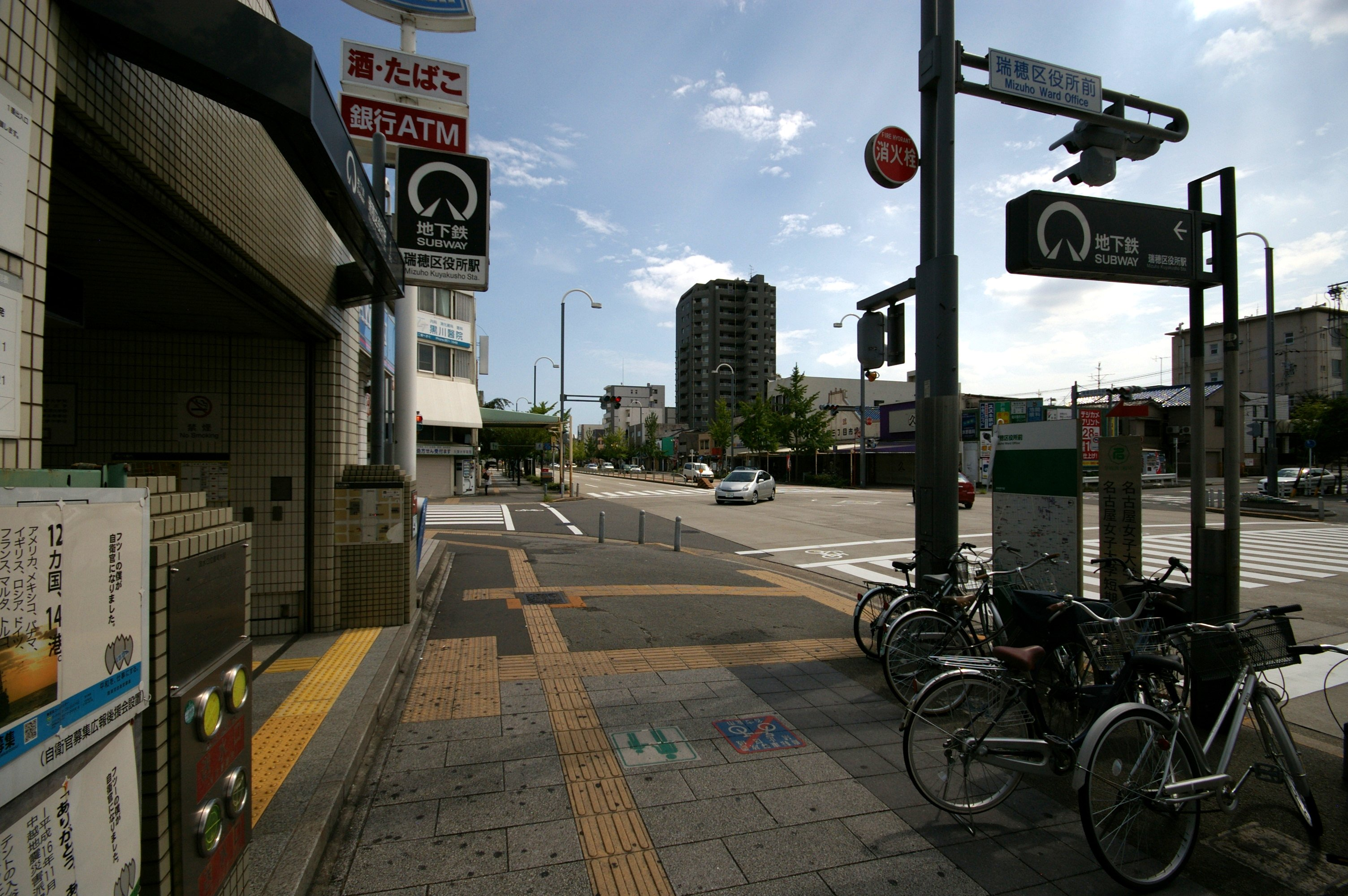

General information
- Location: Mizuhotōri 2-27, Mizuho, Nagoya, Aichi （名古屋市瑞穂区瑞穂通二丁目27） Japan
- System: Nagoya Municipal Subway station
- Operator: Transportation Bureau City of Nagoya
- Line: Sakura-dōri Line
- Connections: Bus stop

Other information
- Station code: S12

History
- Opened: March 30, 1994; 32 years ago

Passengers
- 2007: 7,109 daily

Services
Preceding station	Nagoya Municipal Subway	Following station
Sakurayama S11 towards Taiko-dori	Sakura-dōri Line	Mizuho Undōjō Nishi S13 towards Tokushige
Location

Mizuho Kuyakusho Station (瑞穂区役所駅, Mizuho Kuyakusho-eki; lit. Mizuho Ward Office) is an underground metro station located in Mizuho-ku, Nagoya, Aichi Prefecture, Japan operated by the Nagoya Municipal Subway’s Sakura-dōri Line. It is located 10.4 km (6.5 mi) from the terminus of the Sakura-dōri Line at Taiko-dori Station. The station's name means "Mizuho Ward Office," and as the name indicates, one of the exits is connected directly with Mizuho Ward Office.

== History ==
Mizuho Kuyakusho Station was opened on March 30, 1994.

== Lines ==
- Nagoya Municipal Subway
  - Sakura-dōri Line (Station number: S12)

== Layout ==
Mizuho Kuyakusho Station has one underground island platform with platform screen doors

=== Platforms ===
1	■ Sakura-dōri Line	For Aratama-bashi and Tokushige
2	■ Sakura-dōri Line	For Imaike, Nagoya, and Taiko-dori
