= Aichi Mizuho Junior College =

Private junior college in Nagoya, Japan

Coordinates: 35°07′38″N 136°55′19″E

- 愛知みずほ短期大学
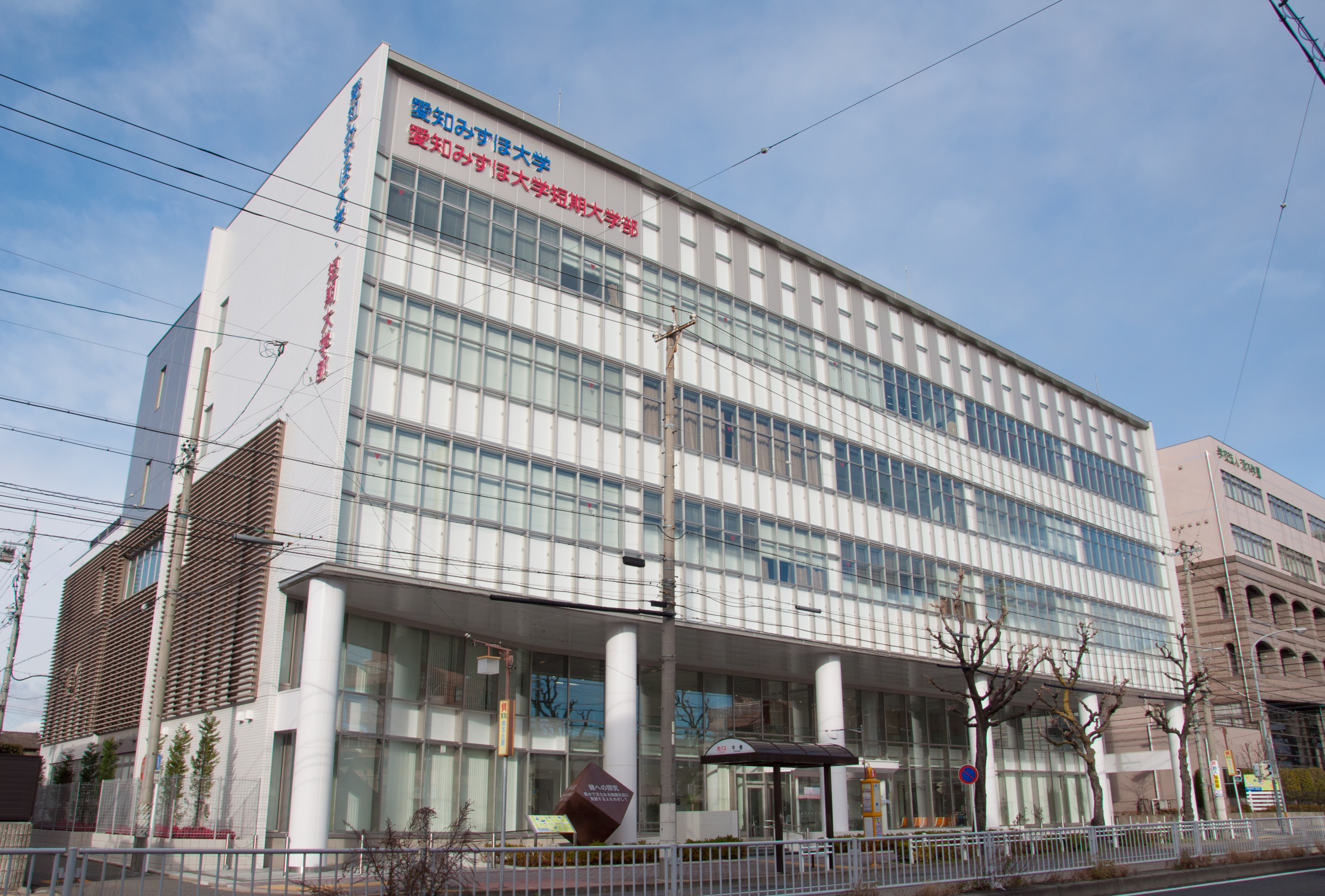
- Established: 1950
- Academic staff: Life sciences
- Location: Mizuho-ku, Nagoya, Aichi Prefecture, Japan
- Website: www.mizuho-c.ac.jp/amjc/

Aichi Mizuho Junior College (愛知みずほ短期大学, Aichi Mizuho Tanki-Daigaku) is a private junior college in Mizuho-ku, Nagoya, Japan.

== History ==
The junior college was founded in 1939 as girls' school, Mizuho Koutou Jogakkou (瑞穂高等女学校). It was chartered as a college in 1950 for women and renamed Aichi Mizuho Junior College. The junior college is offered to dietitians, school nursing, nutrition instructor, and junior high school teacher.

== See also ==
- Aichi Mizuho College
