= Sakurayama Station =

Metro station in Nagoya, Japan

Coordinates: 35.1397°N 136.9332°E

S11 Sakurayama Station 桜山駅
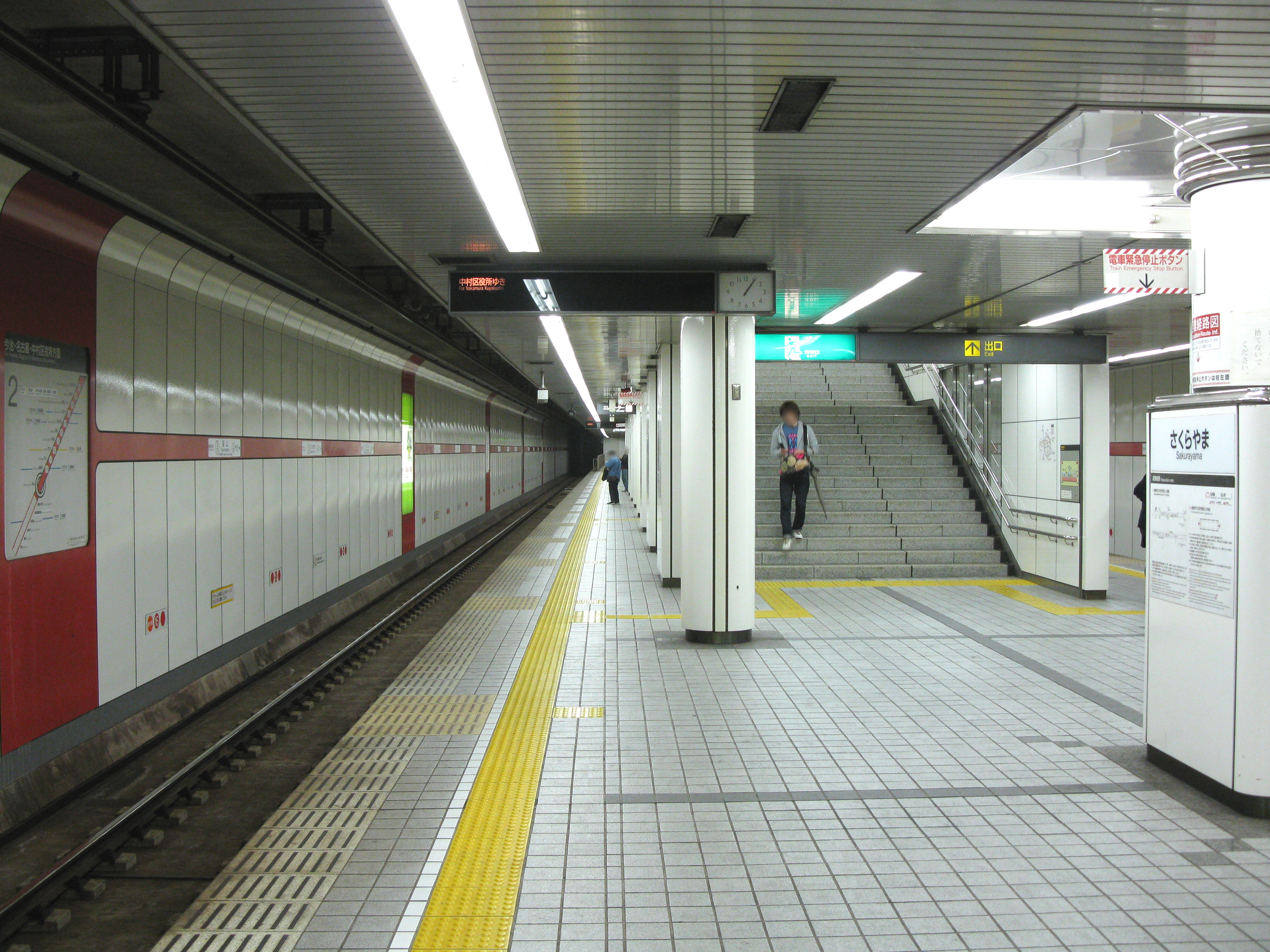

General information
- Location: 1-1-14 Sakurami-cho, Mizuho, Nagoya, Aichi （名古屋市瑞穂区桜見町一丁目1-14） Japan
- System: Nagoya Municipal Subway station
- Operator: Transportation Bureau City of Nagoya
- Line: Sakura-dōri Line
- Connections: Bus stop

Other information
- Station code: S11

History
- Opened: March 30, 1994; 32 years ago

Passengers
- 2007: 10,368 daily

Services
Preceding station	Nagoya Municipal Subway	Following station
Gokiso S10 towards Taiko-dori	Sakura-dōri Line	Mizuho Kuyakusho S12 towards Tokushige
Location

Sakurayama Station (桜山駅, Sakurayama-eki) is an underground metro station located in Mizuho-ku, Nagoya, Aichi Prefecture, Japan operated by the Nagoya Municipal Subway’s Sakura-dōri Line. It is located 9.5 kilometers from the terminus of the Sakura-dōri Line at Taiko-dori Station.

Nagoya City University Hospital is nearby, so the station's sub-name is City University Hospital. The accent color is lime green.

== History ==
Sakurayama Station was opened on March 30, 1994.

Sakurayama Station, a municipal tram, was once located at the Sakurayama intersection in Showa Ward, but the center of the subway station that was built later is in Mizuho Ward. (Sakurayama is the border between Mizuho Ward and Showa Ward.)

Of the eight entrances, entrances 1, 2, 7, and 8 are located in Showa Ward, and entrances 3, 4, 5, and 6 are located in Mizuho Ward.

== Lines ==
- Nagoya Municipal Subway
  - Sakura-dōri Line (Station number: S11)

== Layout ==
station with an island platform, with platform edge doors. The platform can accommodate up to 8 20m cars. There is one track near Tokushige that can accommodate two train sets.

The first trains from Sakurayama Station (two bound for Taiko-dori), which are scheduled to run early in the morning, depart from the track mentioned earlier.

=== Platforms ===
1	■ Sakura-dōri Line	For Aratama-bashi and Tokushige
2	■ Sakura-dōri Line	For Imaike, Nagoya, and Taiko-dori

== Bus route ==
The nearest bus stop is Sakurayama bus stop located on the east and west sides of the Sakurayama intersection. However, it is also possible to transfer to the City University Hospital bus stop (the lines marked with * also stop at the City University Hospital bus stop. The City University Hospital bus stop is located near Sakurayama Station exits 3 and 6.)

Entrances 4 and 5 are also close to the Kawasumicho bus stop and Mizuhodori 1-chome bus stop, which are further south (both stops only for buses bound for Sakurayama and Kanayama).

The following routes connect to Sakurayama bus stop and are operated by the Nagoya City Transportation Bureau. Furthermore, before the opening of the Sakuradori Line, there were lines that went to Meitetsu Jingumae, Shinzuibashi, Chikusa Ekimae, Ozone, etc. via the Nagoya Loop Line.
