= Sōgō Rihabiri Center Station =

Metro station in Nagoya, Japan

M21 Sōgō Rihabiri Center Station 総合リハビリセンター駅
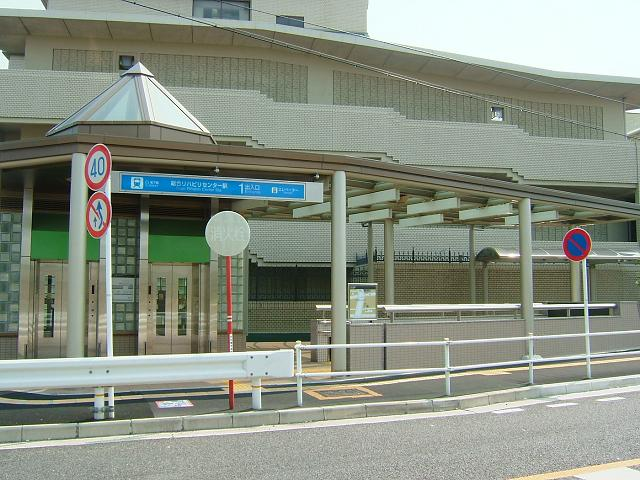

General information
- Location: Yatomi-cho, Tsukimigaoka 5, Mizuho, Nagoya, Aichi （名古屋市瑞穂区彌富町字月見ケ岡5） Japan
- Coordinates: 35°7′49.9116″N 136°57′16.2504″E
- System: Nagoya Municipal Subway station
- Operator: Transportation Bureau City of Nagoya
- Line: Meijō Line
- Connections: Bus stop

Other information
- Station code: M21

History
- Opened: 6 October 2004; 21 years ago

Passengers
- 2009: 2,825 daily

Services
Preceding station	Nagoya Municipal Subway	Following station
Yagoto M20 anticlockwise	Meijō Line	Mizuho Undōjō Higashi M22 clockwise
Location

Sōgō Rihabiri Center Station (総合リハビリセンター駅, Sōgō Rihabiri Center-eki; lit. "General Rehabilitation Center") is an underground metro station located in Mizuho-ku, Nagoya, Aichi Prefecture, Japan operated by the Nagoya Municipal Subway's Meijō Line. It is located 18.5 kilometers from the terminus of the Meijō Line at Kanayama Station.

== History ==
Sōgō Rihabiri Center Station was opened on 6 October 2004.

== Lines ==
- Nagoya Municipal Subway
  - Meijō Line (Station number: M21)

== Layout ==
Sōgō Rihabiri Center Station has one underground island platform.

=== Platforms ===
1	■ Meijō Line	For Yagoto and Motoyama
2	■ Meijō Line	For Aratama-bashi and Kanayama
