= Myōon-dōri Station =

Metro station in Nagoya, Japan

Coordinates: 35.1172°N 136.9296°E

M24 Myōon-dōri Station 妙音通駅
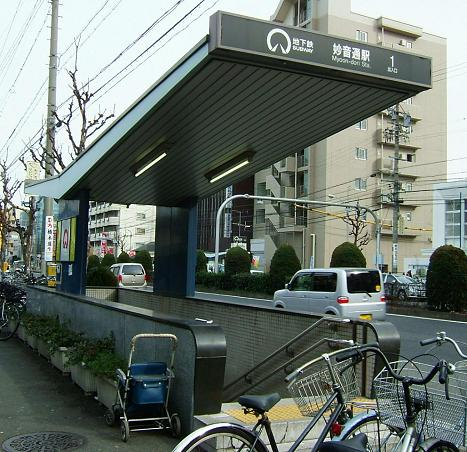

General information
- Location: 3-9 Myōon-dōri, Mizuho, Nagoya, Aichi （名古屋市瑞穂区妙音通三丁目9） Japan
- System: Nagoya Municipal Subway station
- Operator: Transportation Bureau City of Nagoya
- Line: Meijō Line
- Connections: Bus stop

Other information
- Station code: M24

History
- Opened: 30 March 1974; 52 years ago

Passengers
- 2009 (Daily): 1,938

Services
Preceding station	Nagoya Municipal Subway	Following station
Aratama-bashi M23 anticlockwise	Meijō Line	Horita M25 clockwise
Location

Myōon-dōri Station (妙音通駅, Myōon-dōri-eki) is an underground metro station located in Mizuho-ku, Nagoya, Aichi Prefecture, Japan operated by the Nagoya Municipal Subway's Meijō Line. It is located 21.4 kilometers from the terminus of the Meijō Line at Kanayama Station.

== History ==
Myōon-dōri Station was opened on 30 March 1974.

== Lines ==
- Nagoya Municipal Subway
  - Meijō Line (Station number: M24)

== Layout ==
Myōon-dōri Station has two underground opposed side platforms.

=== Platforms ===
1	■ Meijō Line	For Aratama-bashi and Yagoto
2	■ Meijō Line	For Kanayama and Sakae
