= Niigata University Human Experimentation Case Involving the Scrub Typhus Pathogen =

The Niigata University Human Experimentation Case Involving the Scrub Typhus Pathogen (新潟大学におけるツツガムシ病原菌の人体接種問題) also commonly known as the "Niigata scrub typhus human experimentation incident," (新潟ツツガムシ人体実験事件) refers to a human experiment in the 1950s in which internists from the Niigata University School of Medicine injected psychiatric patients at Niigata Psychiatric Hospital (Aoyama Shin-ai Medical Corporation) with the pathogen of scrub typhus (Rickettsia). In this article, the official name is taken from the title of the agenda item when the matter was raised in the National Diet.

== Overview ==
The following summary is based on Chapter VI of Takasugi, 1982, as cited in the references. 以下、概要は参考文献の高杉、1982年の第Ⅵ章による。 In 1955, nurses at Niigata Psychiatric Hospital went on strike during a labor dispute , which disrupted patient treatment and resulted in deaths. Three union leaders were subsequently dismissed by the hospital. The nurses claimed this was unfair dismissal and filed for a provisional injunction with the Niigata District Court to maintain their positions, leading to a legal battle with the hospital. During this process, the dismissed nurses' accusations revealed that, under the direction of Shigehiro Katsura, a professor of internal medicine at Niigata University , physicians from the university had injected rickettsiae into 149 psychiatric patients at the hospital , causing some patients to have their skin peeled off. On September 2, 1956 , the Yomiuri Shimbun reported that eight patients died and one committed suicide as a result of the injections.

Professor Katsura initially told the media that the injections were a fever therapy conducted in collaboration with a psychiatric hospital. However, this explanation was questionable because, although this therapy is effective for syphilis , many of the patients who received the injections had schizophrenia ; psychiatrists were hardly involved , and there were no records in medical charts or nursing logs ; and the duration of the fever was shorter than the number of days that should have been necessary for treating syphilis.

Later, on November 29, 1956, the Yomiuri Shimbun published a statement by Katsura saying that "the real purpose of the injections was research into scrub typhus." Mentally ill patients were used as test subjects in experiments where they were injected with rickettsiae, which caused them to develop fevers, and then their fevers were cooled with aureomycin and chloramycetin, drugs that were not permitted for import or use in Japan at the time .

The Japan Federation of Bar Associations took issue with this , and the issue was debated in the Diet in 1957. However, despite the case constituting assault , the matter ended with only a warning from the Ministry of Justice that it was " human experimentation ."

In his book "Unit 731: Pursuing the Doctors of Germ Warfare" (Tokuma Shoten, 1982), journalist Shingo Takasugi points out the possibility of U.S. military involvement in this matter, citing as evidence that two researchers (Masami Kitaoka, head of the Department of Virus and Rickettsia at the National Institute of Preventive Health, and Yasushi Asanuma, head of the Department of Applied Insects at the National Institute of Resource Sciences ) , who were reported in the Kanagawa Shimbun in 1967 to have been the point of contact for U.S. military funding for scrub mite research, and Takeo Tamiya, who was reported in the Mainichi Shimbun in February 1982 to have been approached by GHQ for human experiments with typhus , were present at a meeting called the " Rickettsia Symposium " held in 1956, along with Shigehiro Katsura, and that Tamiya mentioned support from the U.S. government in his speech .

== Related topics ==
- Human Experiments on Infants at the Nagoya Municipal Infant Home
- Human experimentation
- rickettsia
- Kyushu University Vivisection Incident
