= Naoki Hyakuta =

Japanese novelist and television producer (born 1956)

- 百田 尚樹
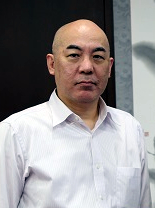
- Hyakuta in 2017

Leader of the Conservative Party of Japan
- Incumbent
- Assumed office 1 September 2023
- Deputy: Vacant
- Preceded by: Position established

Member of the House of Councillors
- Incumbent
- Assumed office 29 July 2025
- Constituency: National PR

Personal details
- Born: February 23, 1956 (age 70) Higashiyodogawa, Osaka, Japan
- Party: Conservative
- Education: Doshisha University (dropped out)
- Writing career
- Language: Japanese
- Period: 2006–2019
- Genres: War, historical fiction, non-fiction, fiction
- Notable works: The Eternal Zero; A Man Called Pirate
- Notable awards: Japan Booksellers' Award (2009, 2011, 2012, 2013)

Naoki Hyakuta (百田 尚樹, Hyakuta Naoki; born February 23, 1956) is a Japanese novelist, television producer, and politician. He is the co-founder and leader of the Conservative Party of Japan. He has been a member of the House of Councillors since 2025, after being elected in that year's election.

Hyakuta is particularly known for his 2006 novel The Eternal Zero, which was adapted into an eponymous 2013 film. Other books of his, several of which have also been adapted into films, include Bokkusu and Monsuta. From 2013 to 2015, he served as a governor of the public broadcaster NHK.

Hyakuta is known for his far-right political views, including his denial of Japanese war crimes before and during World War II, particularly the Nanjing Massacre. According to South Korean media, he also made hateful remarks against Koreans including, "Koreans are scum" and "I want to pick up a sword and go to war with South Korea".

== Early life ==
Hyakuta was born in Higashiyodogawa-ku, Osaka Prefecture, on February 23, 1956. When he was a student at Doshisha University, Hyakuta repeatedly appeared on a dating game show. After dropping out of university after five years, Hyakuta became a screenwriter.

== The Eternal Zero ==
In 2006 Hyakuta's novel The Eternal Zero was published. It became a best-seller, with four million copies sold. It was made into a popular 2013 movie. The novel was criticised by Studio Ghibli director Hayao Miyazaki as being "a pack of lies" about World War II, leading to Hyakuta speculating that Miyazaki was not "right in the head".

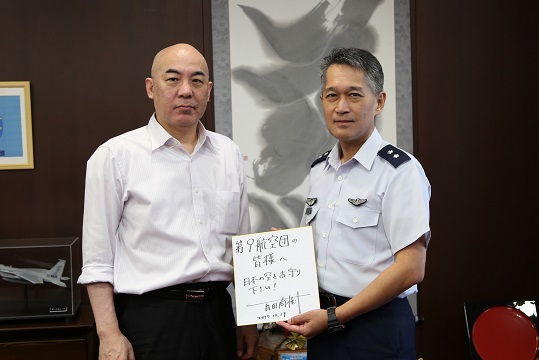
Hyakuta met Kiyoaki Kawanami, Commander of the 9th Air Wing, Air Self-Defense Force (on 29 October 2017).

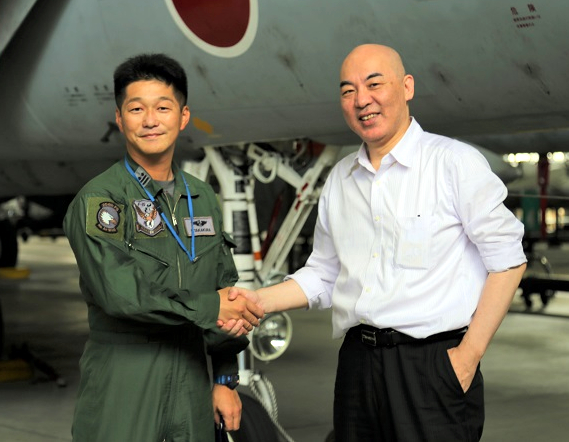
Hyakuta visited Naha Airbase, Air Self-Defense Force (on 29 October 2017).

== As NHK governor ==
In 2013, Hyakuta was selected by Shinzō Abe as one of 12 members of the board of governors of Japan's national broadcaster NHK. This came after the re-election of the Liberal Democratic Party (LDP) led by Abe. Hyakuta had supported in his bid to re-assume leadership of the LDP the previous year. The selection of Hyakuta as an NHK governor caused some criticism, but the diet approved Hyakuta's appointment in November 2013. His historical views denying the Nanjing Massacre sparked extended controversy after his speech in support of Toshio Tamogami's bid for the Tokyo governorship in 2014 bought renewed attention to his rightist views. He resigned as a governor in 2015.

== Political career ==
On June 12, 2023, Hyakuta declared that if the LGBT Understanding Promotion Act, which was then being discussed and debated in the National Diet, were to pass, he would run for the Japanese House of Representatives and form a new political party. Four days later, on June 16, the bill was passed by the House of Representatives and became law. Consequently, he announced the formation of the Conservative Party of Japan on September 1, 2023 with Nagoya mayor Takashi Kawamura as its vice-president and journalist Kaori Arimoto as its secretary-general.

In the 2025 Upper House election, Hyakuta ran as a candidate for the Conservative Party under the proportional representation district and was elected councilor.

== Historical views ==
During a speech on March 3, 2014, in support of Toshio Tamogami's bid for the governorship of Tokyo, Hyakuta stated that the Nanjing Massacre "never happened", and stated that the Tokyo War Crimes Trials were a "sham" to cover up US war crimes such as firebombing and the atomic bombings of Hiroshima and Nagasaki. He also stated that he did not see a need to teach such things to children, as they should be taught the greatness of Japan, and that claims about the Nanjing Massacre were brought up at the Tokyo War Crimes Tribunals only to cancel out the war crimes the US had committed.

In 2014, as the NHK governor, he claimed that it was wrong to state that ethnic Koreans were forcibly brought to Japan during the Japanese colonial period.

== Defamation suits ==
Hyakuta wrote a book called Jun'ai (2014) in memory of his then-recently deceased friend, the radio and TV show host Yashiki Takajin. The book, written as if it were a work of reporting, portrayed Takajin's daughter and his manager as callous, cruel individuals who abandoned him in his final days. Takajin's manager and daughter both sued for slander. Hyakuta claimed that although all the persons named were real, the book was a "fiction." He had relied heavily on uncritical interviews with Takajin's widow, and did not mention her bigamy in the text of the book, only admitting to it later. After multiple appeals, in December 2017 the Supreme Court of Japan found that Hyakuta had slandered Takajin's daughter and ordered 3.65 million yen paid in compensation. In November 2018 the Tokyo District Court found that Hyakuta had slandered Takajin's manager as well, ordering an additional 2.75 million yen in compensation and a written apology.

== Plagiarism ==
His 2018 book Nihon Kokuki (日本国紀), hailed by the publisher as "the ultimate overview of Japanese history", was discovered to contain fictitious statements as well as plagiarism from sources such as Wikipedia articles, the latter being admitted by the author himself. Author Yasumi Tsuhara criticized it as "a book praising one's own country filled with copy-and-pasted excerpts from the web."

== Promoting forced hysterectomy to encourage child birth ==
On November 8, 2024, Hyakuta discussed the declining birth rate issue on the program "News Asahi 8 o'clock!", where he stated that the only way to reverse Japan's rapidly falling fertility rate was to change the social structure.

He suggested policies such as "prohibiting women from attending university after the age of 18," "banning women who are single at 25 from ever getting married," and "performing a hysterectomy on women who have not given birth by the age of 30."

The suggestions prompted public criticism. Hyakuta claimed that the media misinterpreted his words and that he was merely "making suggestions based on science fictions".
