= Haru Koshihara =

Japanese politician (1885–1959)

- 越原 はる

Member of the House of Representatives
- In office 11 April 1946 – 31 March 1947
- Preceded by: Constituency established
- Succeeded by: Constituency abolished
- Constituency: Aichi 1st

Personal details
- Born: 24 January 1885 Kamo, Gifu, Japan
- Died: 29 January 1959 (aged 74)
- Party: National Cooperative
- Education: Waseda University

Haru Koshihara (Japanese: 越原はる; 24 January 1885 – 29 January 1959) was a Japanese educator and politician. The founder of Nagoya Women's University, she was one of the first group of women elected to the House of Representatives in 1946,

== Biography ==
Koshihara was born in the village of Oppara in Kamo District of Gifu Prefecture (now part of Higashishirakawa). She graduated from high school in 1899 and joined a sewing course at Gifu Prefecture Normal School Training Centre. Aged 15, she began working at Kashimo No. 3 Elementary School in Ena District. A year later she returned to her parents to help run the family business for the next four years, before returning to teaching. She joined the preparatory school of Waseda University in 1909 and graduated from its department of Japanese, Chinese and History in 1913. In 1915 she established Nagoya Girls' School with her husband and took over as the school's principal in 1926.

Following World War II, Koshihara contested the 1946 general elections (the first in which women could vote) as a New Civic Party candidate, and was elected to the House of Representatives. After being elected, she joined the National Cooperative Party. She did not run for re-election in the 1947 elections, and in 1948 became principal of Nagoya Jogakuin Junior High School. In 1950 was appointed president of Nagoya Women's Junior College and was awarded a blue Medals of Honor in 1958. She died the following year, and was posthumously awarded the Order of the Sacred Treasure.
