= LGBT Understanding Promotion Act =

Japanese law relating to LGBT rights

LGBT Understanding Promotion Act LGBT理解増進法
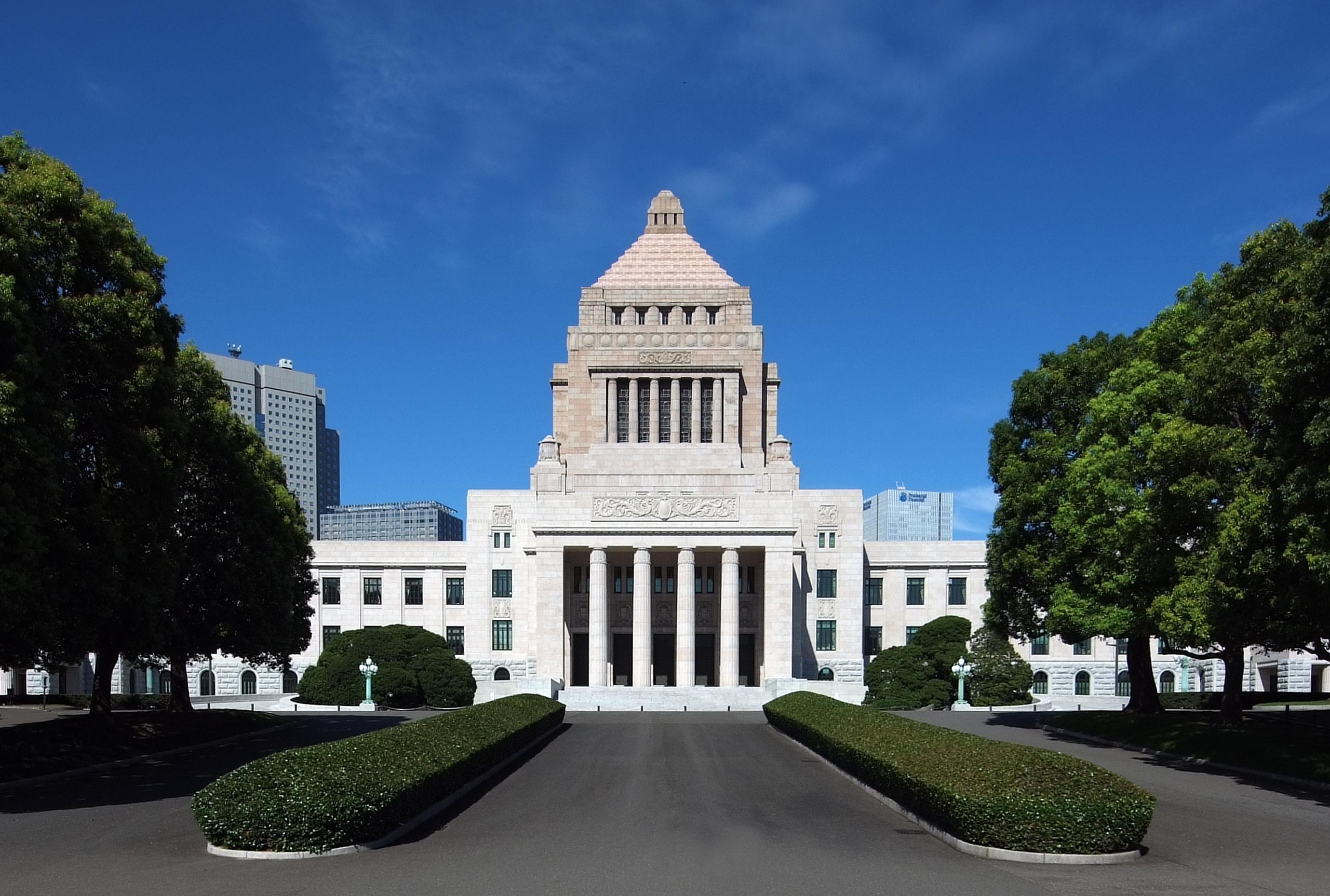
- National Diet Building

House of Representatives
- Long title: An act on Promotion of Public Understanding of Diversity of Sexual Orientation and Gender Identity 性的指向及びジェンダーアイデンティティの多様性に関する国民の理解の増進に関する法律 Seiteki shikō oyobi jendāaidentiti no tayō-sei ni kansuru kokumin no rikai no zōshin ni kansuru Hōritsu
- Citation: Act No. 68 of June 23, 2023 (in Japanese)
- Territorial extent: Japan
- Passed by: House of Representatives
- Passed: 13 June 2023
- Passed by: House of Councillors
- Passed: 16 June 2023
- Assented to: 23 June 2023
- Effective: 23 June 2023

Legislative history

Initiating chamber: House of Representatives
- Bill title: LGBT Understanding Promotion Act
- Bill citation: Proposed Act on Promoting Public Understanding of Diversity in Sexual Orientation and Gender Identity (in Japanese)
- Introduced by: LDP, Komeito
- Introduced: 18 May 2023
- Voting summary: LDP, JIP, Komeito, DPFP voted for; CDP, JCP, Reiwa, SDP voted against

Revising chamber: House of Councillors
- Bill title: LGBT Understanding Promotion Act
- Bill citation: Promoting Public Understanding of Diversity in Sexual Orientation and Gender Identity (in Japanese)
- Received from the House of Representatives: 9 June 2023
- Voting summary: LDP, JIP, Komeito, DPFP voted for; CDP, JCP, Reiwa, SDP voted against

Summary
- Establish basic principles regarding the promotion of measures to spread understanding of LGBT individuals and other sexual minorities; Clarify the roles of the national and local governments in advancing the promotion of understanding of LGBT individuals; Draw up a basic implementation plan to promote understanding of LGBT individuals, and to protect them from "unfair discrimination."
- Status: In force

The Act on Promotion of Public Understanding of Diversity of Sexual Orientation and Gender Identity (Japanese: 性的指向及びジェンダーアイデンティティの多様性に関する国民の理解の増進に関する法律), commonly referred to as the LGBT Understanding Promotion Act (LGBT理解増進法, LGBT rikai zōshin-hō), is a Japanese law that establishes basic principles regarding the promotion of measures to broaden understanding of lesbian, gay, bisexual, and transgender (LGBT) people and other sexual minorities in Japan. The legislation obligates the Japanese government to draw up a basic implementation plan to promote understanding of LGBT people, and to protect them from "unfair discrimination." It also stipulates that government entities, businesses, and schools "need to strive" to take similar action.

The legislation was scheduled to be enacted in concurrent with the 49th G7 summit held in Hiroshima from 19 to 21 May 2023, but after delays the legislation was submitted to the National Diet on 18 May 2023, and enacted on 16 June of the same year after revisions that severely watered-down the legislation, leading to LGBT rights activists and opposition parties criticizing the bill for its ineffectiveness. The law went into effect on 23 June 2023.

The legislation was introduced and passed amidst domestic and international pressure, primarily from the United States through U.S. ambassador to Japan Rahm Emanuel.

== Overview ==
Previous attempts to enact an anti-discrimination legislation was blocked due to the strong influence of conservative factions lobbied by religious organizations such as the Unification Church and the Association of Shinto Shrines within the Liberal Democratic Party (LDP). The most recent attempt was in June 2019, where after three years of consultations, a special committee of the LDP announced the LGBT Understanding and Enhancement Bill, which aims to improve understanding of LGBT issues, would be introduced to the National Diet. However, LGBT rights activists criticized the bill for falling short by not mentioning same-sex marriage or anti-discrimination protections.

In April 2021, the LDP announced it would pass the LGBT Understanding and Enhancement Bill during the 204th National Diet session, set to end in June for the 2020 Summer Olympics and Paralympics in Tokyo. The bill only requires the government to "promote understanding of LGBT people" and does not actually ban discrimination. However, the bill was never introduced.

In May 2021, members of the bipartisan Diet Members Caucus on LGBT-related issues agreed to formulate another anti-discrimination bill. The legislation became a priority in 2023 after Japan took the presidency of the G7, with international spotlight on the Japanese government due to Japan being the only G7 member without legislation that protects LGBT rights. The LDP, as well as its junior coalition partner Komeito expedited proceedings for the enactment of the bill as a result. Revisions were made in consultation with conservative factions of the LDP, Nippon Ishin no Kai and the Democratic Party for the People, which severely watered-down the bill. As a result, the bill was opposed by opposition parties including the Constitutional Democratic Party, Japanese Communist Party, Reiwa Shinsengumi, and the Social Democratic Party, as well as hardline conservatives of the LDP, and women's rights advocates while LGBT rights advocates and organizations expressed the opinion that the legislation "rolled back our efforts to advance LGBT rights" and "promotes discrimination against sexual minorities."

== Legislative history ==
On 12 May 2023, a joint meeting of the LDP's Special Mission Committee on Sexual Minorities and First Subcommittee of the Cabinet was held and despite persistent opposition to the bill, the discussion was cut short by the committee chairmen and approved the bill. Member of the House of Councillors Masaaki Akaike said in his X account: "I asked for careful deliberation until the very end, but even with the majority of votes being against the bill, the decision was made to leave it to the chairperson, which is an irresponsible policy deliberation and party management."

On May 18, the LDP and Komeito submitted the government coalition's draft bill to the House of Representatives. The government coalition draft was a revision of the original draft agreed upon by the Diet Members Caucus for LGBT-related Issues back in May 2021, rewording and weakening certain words inside the bill to appease conservatives within both parties. In opposition to the revisions, the original draft was also submitted to the House of Representatives by the CDP, JCP and SDP.

On May 26, JIP and the DPFP submitted to the House of Representatives a draft of the legislation that was different from both the original draft and the government coalition's draft with further revisions that weakened the effectiveness of the bill.

On June 7, the government and opposition parties agreed that the three bills (original bill, government coalition revision and JIP-DPFP revision) would be discussed together in the Cabinet Committee of the House of Representatives on June 9 and voted on the same day.

On June 9, the LDP, Komeito, JIP and the DPFP agreed to combine the government coalition revision and the JIP-DPFP revision into one legislation, almost fully incorporating the contents of the JIP-DPFP revision. The new LDP-Komeito-JIP-DPFP revision also added a provision stating that the legislation should focus on "taking care to ensure that all citizens can live their lives in peace" to include representation of cisgender and heterosexual individuals in the bill.

The House of Representatives Cabinet Committee on the same day approved the LDP-Komeito-JIP-DPFP revision after a majority vote while the original bill was rejected.

On June 13, at a plenary session of the House of Representatives, the LDP-Komeito-JIP-DPFP revision was approved by a majority vote. Seven LDP lawmakers were absent in the voting, with the most notable being Shuichi Takatori. Takatori left the chamber moments before voting began and returned after the vote was over. Takatori stated that the reason for leaving the chamber was that he had a stomach ache, and denied rumors that he left in opposition to the bill but later admitted that he had concerns over the contents of the legislation. The original bill was rejected during the same session.

On June 15, the House of Councillors Cabinet Committee voted on the same day after deliberations began, and the LDP-Komeito-JIP-DPFP bill was passed with a majority vote. The original bill was rejected during the same session.

On June 16, at a plenary session of the House of Councillors the LDP-Komeito-JIP-DPFP bill was passed with a majority vote, and enacted. Three LDP councilors: Akiko Santo, Shigeharu Aoyama, and Masamune Wada left the room during the vote, resulting in Secretary-General of the LDP in the House of Councillors Hiroshige Seko announcing his intention to give disciplinary actions to the three.

On June 23, the law was promulgated and went into effect.

=== Comparison of the bills ===
The table below shows the following differences between the four bills that have been submitted.

Comparison of bills submitted
	Bipartisan agreement (Original bill)	Government coalition revision	JIP-DPFP revision	LDP-Komeito-JIP-DPFP revision
Parties	LDP (withdrew), CDP, JCP, SDP	LDP, Komeito	JIP, DPFP	LDP, Komeito, JIP, DPFP
Definition	性自認 (Seijinin) Gender Identity: Refers to one's self-identification of their gender.; Emphasizes the individual's subjective perception and recognition of their own gender.; Often used in discussions about personal identity and how individuals perceive and define their own gender.	性同一性 (Seidōitsusei) Gender Identity: Refers to gender identity in terms of its consistency or congruence with one's biological sex or assigned gender at birth.; Used to describe the alignment between an individual's gender identity and their anatomical, chromosomal, and/or hormonal characteristics.; Often used in medical or psychological contexts, especially in discussions surrounding gender dysphoria and transgender identity.	ジェンダーアイデンティティ (Jendāaidentiti) Gender Identity: Direct translation of "gender identity" in Japanese.; A broader and more inclusive term compared to 性自認 and 性同一性, as it does not necessarily focus on the alignment between gender identity and biological sex.	ジェンダーアイデンティティ adopted
Principle	"Discrimination is not tolerated"	"Unfair discrimination is not tolerated"	"Unfair discrimination is not tolerated"	"Unfair discrimination is not tolerated" adopted
Research	"Promoting Research and Studies" [for a more inclusive society]	"Promoting Academic Research"	"Promoting Academic Research"	"Promoting Academic Research" adopted
Education	"Responsibility of the school management" to promote inclusive education	"Responsibility of the school employees" to promote inclusive education	"Responsibility of the school employees to provide education appropriate to physical and mental development of the students with the understanding and cooperation of parents and guardians."	"Responsibility of the school employees to provide education appropriate to physical and mental development of the students with the understanding and cooperation of parents and guardians." adopted
Other support	"Promote voluntary activities of private [LGBT rights] organizations"	"Promote voluntary activities of private [LGBT rights] organizations"	Removed	Removed
Addendum	—N/a	—N/a	"To ensure that all citizens can live in peace and security."	"To ensure that all citizens can live in peace and security." adopted

== Reaction ==
=== Domestic ===
==== Liberal Democratic Party ====
Several high-profile LDP lawmakers such as Minister of Economy, Trade and Industry Yasutoshi Nishimura, Secretary-General of the LDP in the House of Councillors Hiroshige Seko, and Seiko Hashimoto formed a new Diet group following the passage of the bill named Parliamentary League for Protecting the Safety and Security of All Women and Ensuring Fairness in Women's Sports (全ての女性の安心・安全と女子スポーツの公平性等を守る議員連盟) to secure "the 'right to life' of women by establishing a system that protects their safety and security." As of July 2023, the Diet group has at least 100 members from both houses of the National Diet.

Shuichi Takatori, the LDP representative who left the House of Representatives chamber before voting citing a stomach ache, said in an interview with journalist Kaori Arimoto that he actually left due to his disapproval with the bill, stating that "I had argued so much against the legislation. It was difficult for me to express my approval." He also stated that the LDP has "changed" towards a more moderate and liberal social stance following the assassination of Shinzo Abe in 2022.

Akiko Santo, member and former president of the House of Councillors who left the chamber before voting began, cited possibilities of "people pretending to be a woman entering women's restrooms and other women-only spaces." as her basis of abstaining. She furthered "If this bill passes and the trend becomes that it is natural to accept anything, it will become a very serious problem."

Shigeharu Aoyama, member of the House of Councilors who left the chamber before voting began, said that "all concerns have not been addressed" as his basis to not voting. Aoyama disagreed on replacement of the phrase 性同一性 (Seidōitsusei) with ジェンダーアイデンティティ (Jendāaidentiti) following the merging of the Government coalition and JIP-DPFP revisions, saying, "people have hardly ever used this word. I disagree with the replacement of the Japanese word with katakana". He also voiced his disapproval of the clause regarding education to promote "inclusive education" to students.

Masamune Wada, member of the House of Councilors who left the chamber before voting began said that "My withdrawal was the result of listening to the voices of many citizens, party members, and supporters. I did this with my own people in mind."

==== Constitutional Democratic Party ====
Katsuya Okada, secretary general of the CDP criticized the government coalition's revision, saying, "It is a major step backward from what was agreed upon in a bipartisan manner. We have received no explanation for this."

Jun Azumi, chairman of the Diet task force of the CDP, said that the government coalition's revision was "vague and lame. It is a rare disgrace in the history of Japanese law."

House of Councillors member Taiga Ishikawa, the first openly-gay member of the National Diet said he "felt a mixture of deep sadness, anger, and resentment," and furthered, "I want to support a bill that actually eliminates discrimination."

The CDP submitted a motion of no confidence against the Kishida Cabinet on 16 June 2023, citing the LDP's revision of the original bipartisan bill as one of the reasons for the motion. The no-confidence motion was rejected following a majority vote.

==== LGBT rights advocates ====
The LGBT Law Federation issued a statement criticizing the bill, saying, "The content of the bill is the exact opposite of what we have been seeking, and its contents are such that it will force the parties concerned to live in even greater difficulty."

On 14 June, several LGBT rights activists protested in front of the National Diet Building against the passage of the legislation, citing that the government coalition's revision would "do nothing but promote further discrimination against sexual minorities."

==== Others ====
Tomoko Yoshino, president of the Japanese Trade Union Confederation (RENGO) criticized the bill saying, "It is extremely regrettable that the Diet deliberations proceeded on a bill that is backward from the original bipartisan bill. RENGO also expressed its intention to push for the amendment of the law and the enactment of a separate legislation that clearly stipulates the prohibition of discrimination against sexual minorities.

Novelist, television producer and right-wing political commentator Naoki Hyakuta expressed strong opposition to the bill and declared that he would run for the House of Representatives and form a new party if the bill were to be enacted. Following the passage of the bill, Hyakuta, alongside journalist Kaori Arminoto founded the far-right Conservative Party of Japan on 1 September 2023. As of April 2024, the party has more than 60,000 members, 9 seats in municipal assemblies, and is the most followed Japanese political party on X.

=== International ===
U.S. ambassador to Japan Rahm Emanuel said that "Japan turned the tide today with the Diet's passage of the LGBT law." Congratulating prime minister Fumio Kishida "for his leadership" and commending the Japanese public for their "commitment to LGBTQI+ rights." He added that the legislation is a "significant step on the journey to securing equal rights for all."

The Human Rights Watch said that while the passage of the bill is a "step forward", furthered that the bill "does not fully ensure equal protection, and further action, including a comprehensive nondiscrimination act, which is urged by advocates is needed."
