= Nagoya Women's University =

Private women's university in Nagoya, Aichi, Japan

- 名古屋女子大学
- Type: Private university Women's college
- Established: 1915
- Founders: Haru Koshihara
- Location: Nagoya, Japan; 35.1320°N 136.9381°E (Mizuho-ku, Nagoya); 35.1142°N 136.9763°E (Tempaku-ku, Nagoya)
- Website: www.nagoya-wu.ac.jp/en/

Nagoya Women's University (名古屋女子大学, Nagoya joshi daigaku) is a private women's university in Nagoya, Aichi, Japan with campus at Mizuho-ku. The predecessor of the school was founded in 1915, and it was chartered as a junior college in 1950.
