= Human Experiments on Infants at the Nagoya Municipal Infant Home =

Human Experiments on Infants at the Nagoya Municipal Infant Home (名古屋市立乳児院の乳児に対する人体実験) refers to a series of human rights abuses that occurred at the Nagoya Municipal Infant Home in Nagoya, Aichi Prefecture, exemplified by the death of one infant in November 1952. The official title is the subject line of the warning letter issued by the Japan Federation of Bar Associations.

== Background ==
In the early summer of 1955 (Showa 30), a medical staff member A from Nagoya City University (Nagoya City University Hospital) visited the Human Rights Committee of the Nagoya Bar Association and requested an investigation into the matter.

In September 1955, a warning letter regarding this matter, approved by the Board of Directors of the Japan Federation of Bar Associations, was published. This warning letter stated that, based on the investigation conducted after receiving a lawsuit and evidence from A, the case was "a human experiment conducted without any medical purpose, without obtaining the consent of the infant's guardian, and without any preliminary experiments," and asserted that the cause of the infant diarrhea outbreak at the hospital and the death of one infant was the "administration" of α- E. coli and β-E. coli in mid-November 1952, or the "infection caused by the administered bacteria."

Professor B of the Department of Pediatrics at Nagoya City University, who was accused, denied any causal relationship between the ingestion of E. coli and the deaths of the infants, but admitted that he had administered the bacteria to two infants who did not die. Professor B also denied any danger of the bacteria he administered, but expressed regret that in many cases the children in his care did not have parents who could give their consent.

The Japan Federation of Bar Associations included an overview of this case in its Human Rights White Paper.

== Remarks ==
Medical staff member A, who blew the whistle on this matter, claimed he was assaulted by other medical staff members and called "schizophrenic" by B.

Journalist Shingo Takasugi, who began working on this case in 1972, was denied access to the materials provided by A due to a decision by the Japan Federation of Bar Associations, and A also refused to be interviewed. However, Takasugi was able to interview lawyer C, who had been hired by A, in the presence of the Vice President of the Japan Federation of Bar Associations and President of the Nagoya Bar Association. Later, however, C sent a certified letter requesting the retraction of the interview.

When A refused to be interviewed by Takasugi, he said, "I was ostracized by the Pediatric Society because of my whistleblowing, but recently I've been able to get work from the university and finally make a decent living. When I was younger, I blew the whistle because I felt there were people doing unpleasant things that didn't suit me (referring to human experimentation; Takasugi's note), but I didn't consider the trouble I was causing others. I've come to realize that the world is much more complicated than that."

This infant care facility had many orphans, but infant D, who died in this case, had both parents alive. His father was a civil servant, and he was a newcomer who had been admitted because his mother was ill and unable to care for him. In his 1973 book "Human Experimentation in Japan," Takasugi had omitted C's statement about "why only the newcomer D died in such a short time, just one hour after infection," at C's request to revoke it, but he revealed it in his 1984 book Following Japan's Auschwitz.

(Sources: Takasugi's aforementioned book, and Chapter 7, "Human Experiments Concerning Infants," of "Human Experiments in Japan")

== See also ==
- Human experimentation
- Nagoya City University
