= The Eternal Zero =

2006 novel by Naoki Hyakuta

- Author: Naoki Hyakuta
- Language: Japanese
- Genre: War
- Publisher: Ohta Publishing
- Publication date: August 23, 2006
- Publication place: Japan
- Pages: 448
- ISBN: 9784778310264

The Eternal Zero (永遠の0, Eien no Zero) is a 2006 novel by Naoki Hyakuta. It became a best-seller, with four million copies sold. It was made into a popular 2013 movie. The novel was criticised by famed Studio Ghibli director Hayao Miyazaki as being "a pack of lies" about the war, leading to Hyakuta speculating that Miyazaki "wasn't right in the head".

== Adaptations ==
=== Film ===
The story was adapted as a film in 2013.

=== TV series ===
In June 2014, TV Tokyo announced that the station would adapt the film for a TV drama featuring Osamu Mukai. Some parts in the original book which don't appear in the film are described in the drama. It was broadcast on 11, 14 and 15 February 2015.

=== Manga ===
The story was adapted as a manga in 2010.
