= Mizuho Undōjō Higashi Station =

Metro station in Nagoya, Japan

Coordinates: 35.1230°N 136.9484°E

M22 Mizuho Undōjō Higashi Station 瑞穂運動場東駅
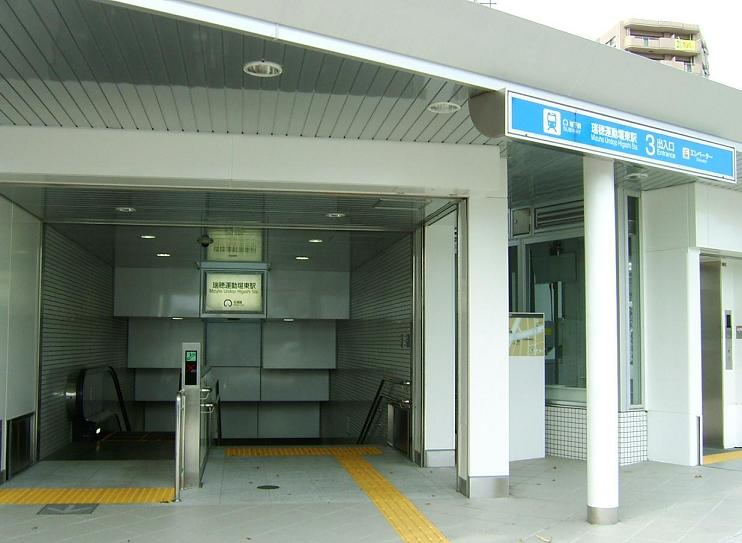

General information
- Location: Hasshōdōri 3–18, Mizuho, Nagoya, Aichi （名古屋市瑞穂区八勝通三丁目18） Japan
- System: Nagoya Municipal Subway station
- Operator: Transportation Bureau City of Nagoya
- Line: Meijō Line
- Connections: Bus stop

Other information
- Station code: M22

History
- Opened: 6 October 2004; 21 years ago

Passengers
- 2009: 3,931 daily

Services
Preceding station	Nagoya Municipal Subway	Following station
Sōgō Rihabiri Center M21 anticlockwise	Meijō Line	Aratama-bashi M23 clockwise
Location

Mizuho Undōjō Higashi Station (瑞穂運動場東駅, Mizuho Undōjō Higashi-eki; lit. Mizuho Sports Ground East) is an underground metro station located in Mizuho-ku, Nagoya, Aichi Prefecture, Japan operated by the Nagoya Municipal Subway's Meijō Line. It is located 19.4 kilometers from the terminus of the Meijō Line at Kanayama Station.

== History ==
Mizuho Undōjō Higashi Station was opened on 6 October 2004.

== Lines ==
- Nagoya Municipal Subway
  - Meijō Line (Station number: M22)

== Layout ==
Mizuho Undōjō Higashi Station has one underground island platform.

=== Platforms ===
1	■ Meijō Line	For Yagoto and Motoyama
2	■ Meijō Line	For Aratama-bashi and Kanayama
