= Aichi Mizuho College =

University in Aichi Prefecture, Japan

- 愛知みずほ大学
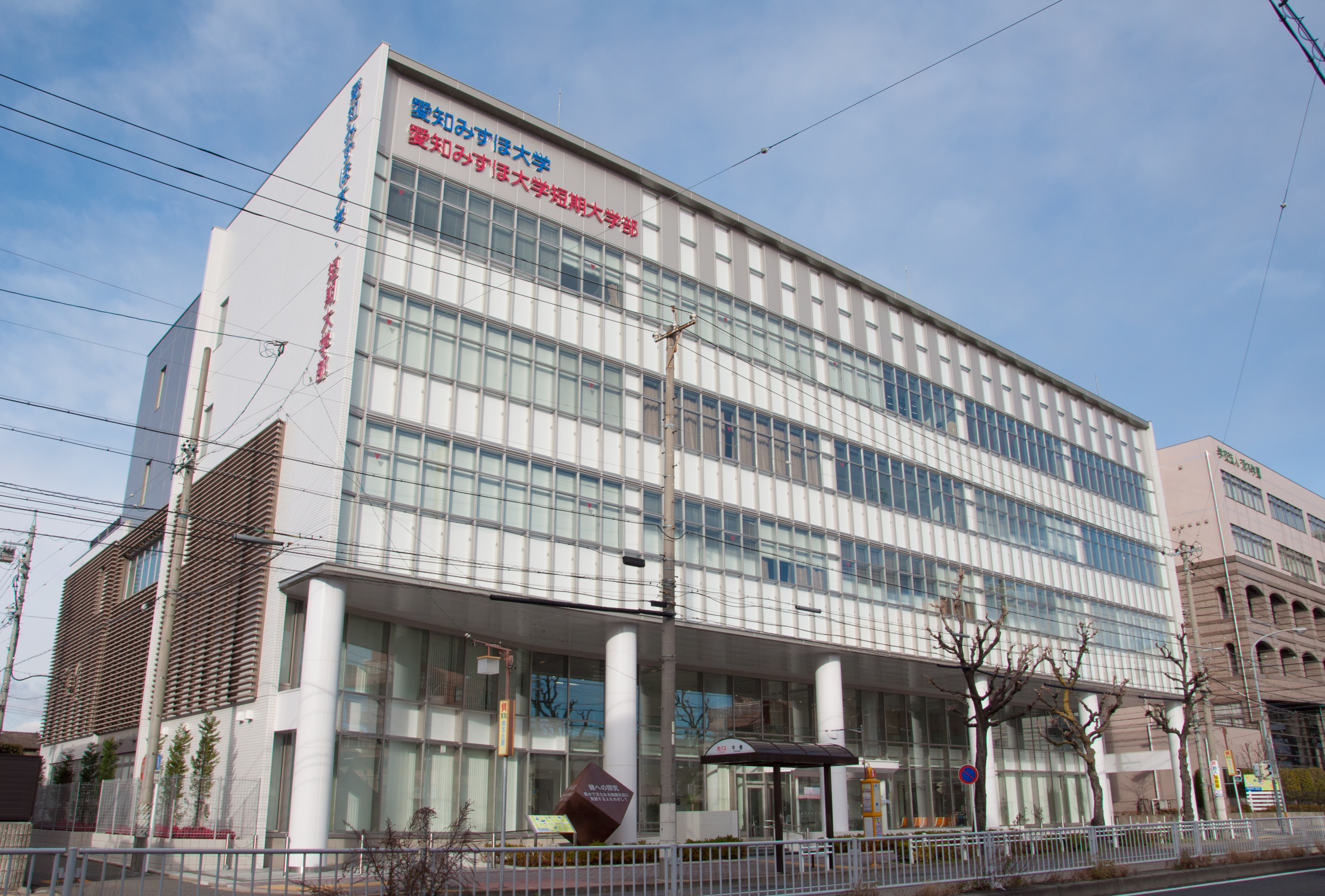
- Aichi Mizuho College, Nagoya campus
- Type: Private
- Established: 1940
- Location: Mizuho-ku, Nagoya and Toyota, Aichi, Japan; 35.125209°N 137.18791°E
- Website: amc.mizuho-c.ac.jp/hp/top.html (in Japanese)

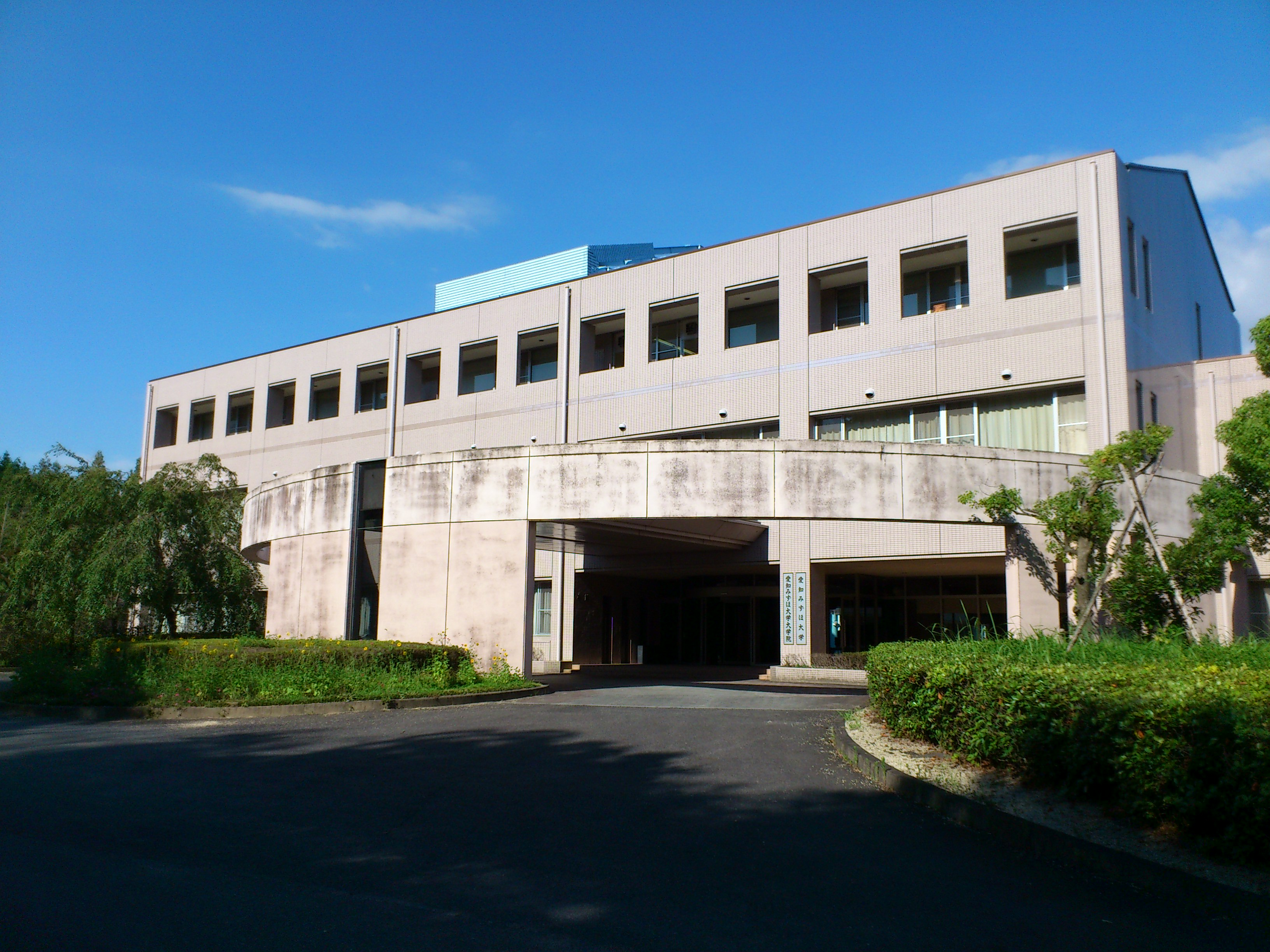
Aichi Mizuho College

Aichi Mizuho College (愛知みずほ大学, Aichi mizuho daigaku) is a private university with campuses in Mizuho-ku, Nagoya and Toyota, Aichi in Japan. The predecessor of the school, Aichi Mizuho Junior College, a junior college, was established in 1940, and it became a four-year college in 1993.
