= Mizuho Undōjō Nishi Station =

Metro station in Nagoya, Japan

Coordinates: 35.1247°N 136.9353°E

S13 Mizuho Undōjō Nishi Station 瑞穂運動場西駅
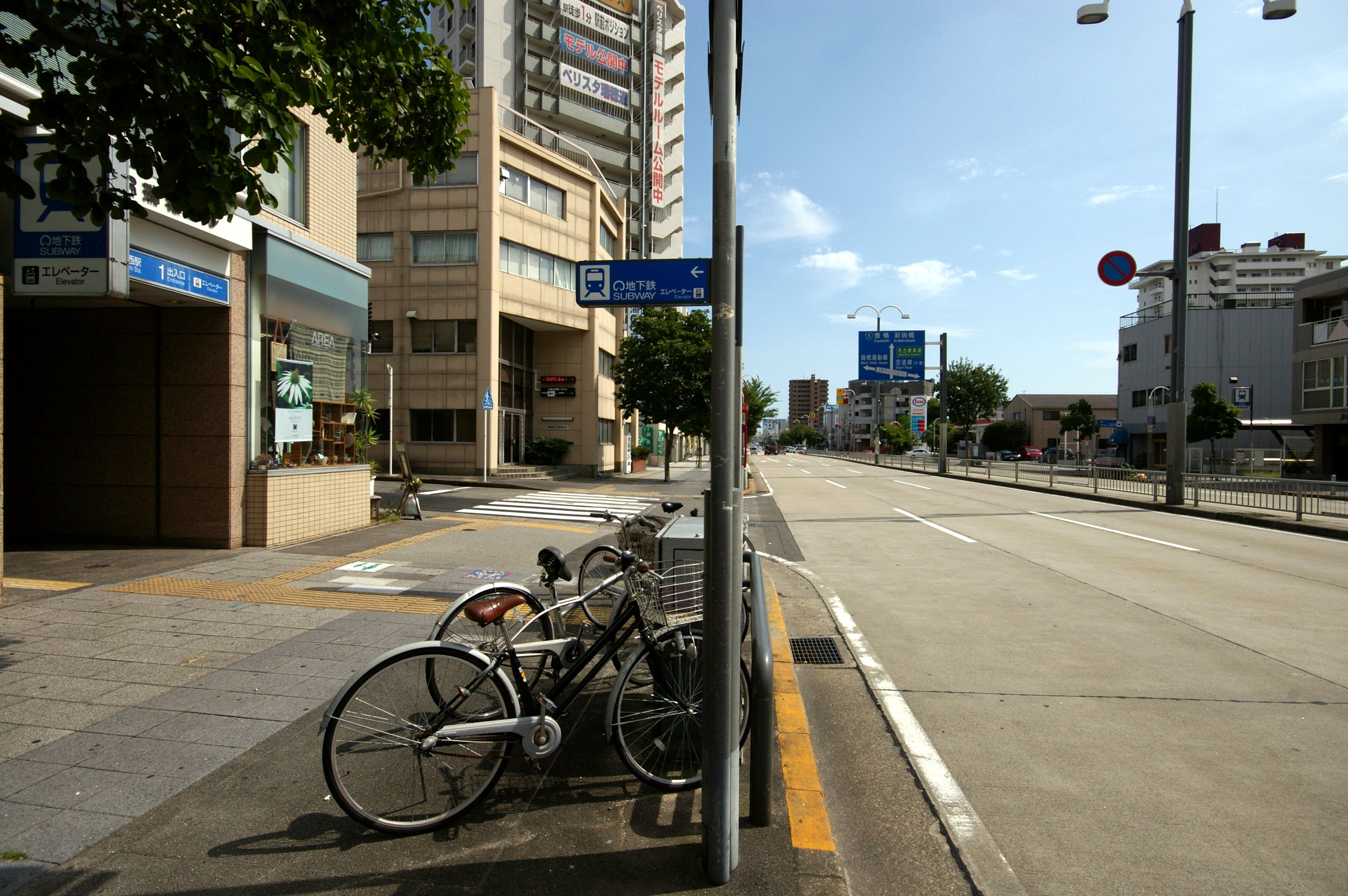

General information
- Location: Mizuhotōri 5–24, Mizuho, Nagoya, Aichi （名古屋市瑞穂区瑞穂通五丁目24） Japan
- System: Nagoya Municipal Subway station
- Operator: Transportation Bureau City of Nagoya
- Line: Sakura-dōri Line
- Connections: Bus stop

Other information
- Station code: S13

History
- Opened: 30 March 1994; 32 years ago
- Former names: Mizuho Undōjō (until 2004)

Passengers
- 2007: 3,046 daily

Services
Preceding station	Nagoya Municipal Subway	Following station
Mizuho Kuyakusho S12 towards Taiko-dori	Sakura-dōri Line	Aratama-bashi S14 towards Tokushige
Location

Mizuho Undōjō Nishi Station (瑞穂運動場西駅, Mizuho Undōjō Nishi-eki; lit. Mizuho Sports Ground West) is an underground metro station located in Mizuho-ku, Nagoya, Aichi Prefecture, Japan operated by the Nagoya Municipal Subway's Sakura-dōri Line. It is located 11.4 km (7.1 mi) from the terminus of the Sakura-dōri Line at Taiko-dori Station.

== History ==
Mizuho Undōjō Nishi Station was opened on 30 March 1994.

== Lines ==
- Nagoya Municipal Subway
  - Sakura-dōri Line (Station number: S13)

== Layout ==
Mizuho Undōjō Nishi Station has one underground island platform with platform screen doors.

=== Platforms ===
1	■ Sakura-dōri Line	For Aratama-bashi and Tokushige
2	■ Sakura-dōri Line	For Imaike, Nagoya, and Taiko-dori
