= Nagoya City University =

Public university in Japan

Coordinates: 35.139°N 136.935°E

- Motto: None
- Type: Public
- Established: Founded 1884, Chartered 1950
- President: Kenjiro Kohri
- Academic staff: 531 full-time
- Undergraduates: 3126
- Postgraduates: 720
- Location: Nagoya, Aichi, Japan
- Campus: Urban
- Website: nagoya-cu.ac.jp/english

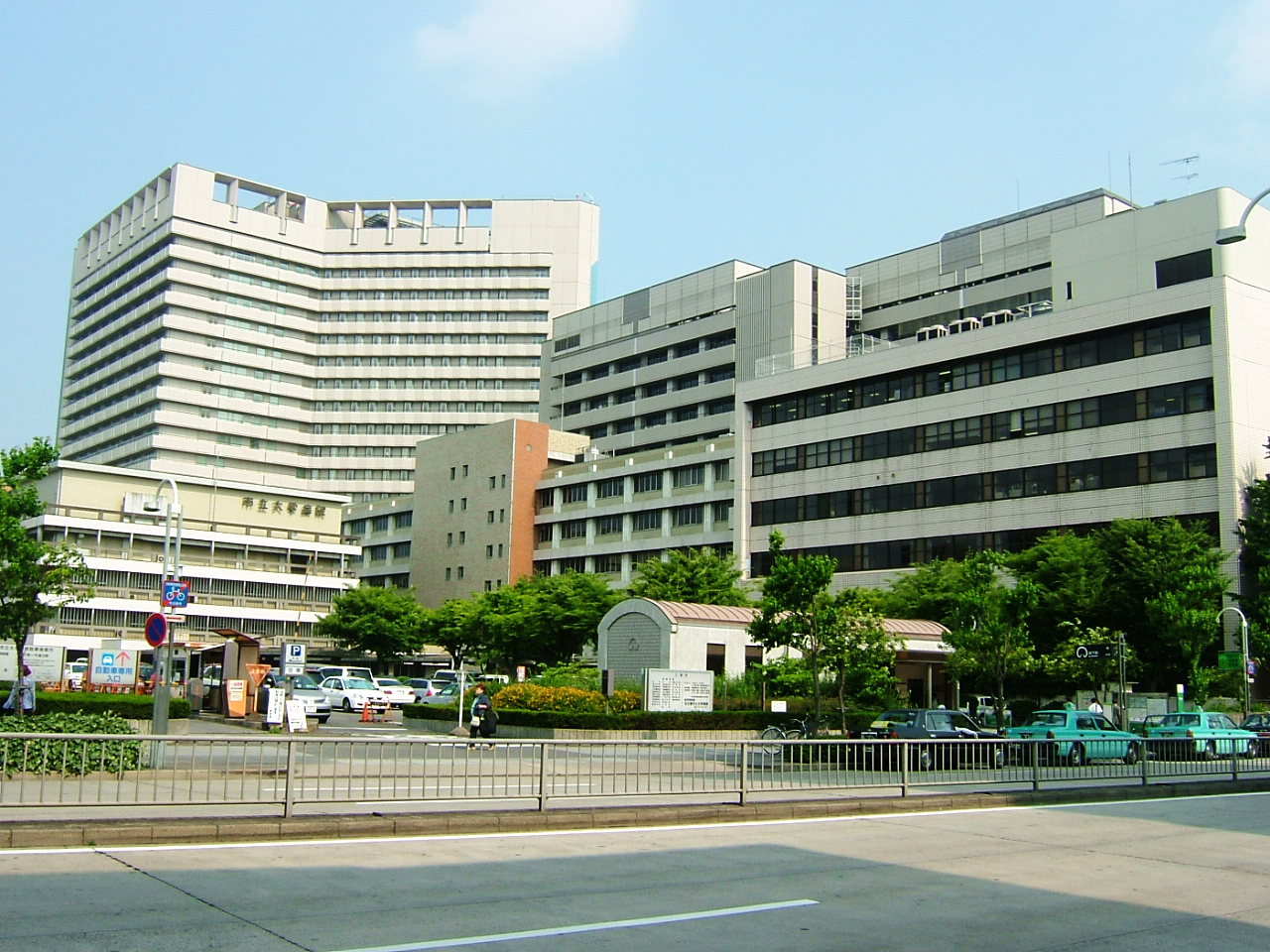
Nagoya City University Hospital in Kawasumi

Nagoya City University (名古屋市立大学, Nagoya shiritsu daigaku), abbreviated to Meishidai (名市大), is a public university in Japan. The main campus (Kawasumi) is located in Mizuho-ku, Nagoya City. Other three campuses (Yamanohata, Tanabe-dori and Kita Chikusa) are also located in the city.

== History ==
Nagoya City University (NCU) was established in 1950 by merging two municipal universities: Nagoya City Women's Medical College (名古屋女子医科大学) and Nagoya Pharmaceutical College (名古屋薬科大学). So NCU originally had two faculties: Medical School and Faculty of Pharmaceutical Sciences.

NCU has added divisions and graduate schools as follows:

- 1955: College of General Education
- 1961: Doctoral course for the Division of Medicine
- 1964: Faculty of Economics
- 1966: Doctoral course for the Division of Pharmaceutical Sciences
- 1970: Doctoral course for the Division of Economics
- 1988: College of Nursing
- 1996: School of Humanities and Social Sciences / School of Design and Architecture
  (by reorganizing and merging College of General Education, Nagoya Municipal Women's College [founded in 1947] and Nagoya City College of Child Education [founded in 1946])
- 1999: School of Nursing (by reorganizing College of Nursing)

Below are the histories of two preceding colleges of NCU:

Nagoya City Women's Medical College

NCWMC was founded in 1943, during World War II, to meet the growing need of doctors (the college's original name in Japanese was Nagoya shiritsu joshi kōtō igaku senmon gakkō (名古屋市立女子高等医学専門学校), which was renamed Nagoya shiritsu joshi igaku senmon gakkō (名古屋市立女子医学専門学校) in 1944.). In 1947, after the war, the college became a university (daigaku) under Japan's older education system. In 1950 NCWMC was merged into NCU and became Medical School (a coeducational school). The old campus of NCWMC is NCU Tanabe-dori Campus today.

Nagoya Pharmaceutical College

The origin of NPC was founded in 1884 as Nagoya School of Pharmacy (名古屋薬学校, Nagoya yaku gakkō). This was a private school run by Nagoya Pharmaceutical Co., Ltd. (Nakakita Co., Ltd. today). In 1890 the school was renamed Aichi School of Pharmacy (愛知薬学校). The school was abolished in 1921, because it could not afford to meet the new requirement of Japanese pharmacist test (The requirement was that the examinees should be the graduates of 3-year pharmaceutical schools; Aichi School of Pharmacy had only a 2.5-year course.).

The alumni revived the school in 1931 as Aichi Higher School of Pharmacy (愛知高等薬学校), which had a 3-year course. In 1935 the school developed into Nagoya Pharmaceutical College (名古屋薬学専門学校, Nagoya yakugaku senmon gakkō). During World War II, shortage of fuel gas struck the college, and in 1946 the college was municipalized by Nagoya City and became coeducational. In 1949 the college was reorganized into new Nagoya Pharmaceutical College (名古屋薬科大学, Nagoya yakka daigaku), under Japanese new educational system. In 1950 NPC was merged into NCU to constitute the Faculty of Pharmaceutical Sciences. The old campus of NPC is Takinomizu Park today (located in Midori-ku, Nagoya).

== Graduate schools ==
- Medical Sciences (in Kawasumi Campus)
- Pharmaceutical Sciences (in Tanabe-dori Campus)
- Economics (in Yamanohata Campus)
- Humanities and Social Sciences (in Yamanohata Campus)
- Design and Architecture (in Kita Chikusa Campus)
- Nursing (in Kawasumi Campus)
- Natural Sciences (in Yamanohata Campus)

== Undergraduate schools ==
- Medical School (in Kawasumi Campus)
- Faculty of Pharmaceutical Sciences (in Tanabe-dori Campus)
- Faculty of Economics (in Yamanohata Campus)
- School of Humanities and Social Sciences (in Yamanohata Campus)
- School of Design and Architecture (in Kita Chikusa Campus)
- School of Nursing (in Kawasumi Campus)

== Institutes ==
- Library and Information Processing Center
- University Hospital
- Institute of Molecular Medicine
- Center for Experimental Animal Science
- Advanced Pharmaceutical Sciences Center
- Institute of Economic Research
- Institute for Studies in Humanities and Cultures
- Institute of Natural Sciences
