= Conservative Party of Japan =

Far-right political party in Japan

Conservative Party of Japan 日本保守党 Nippon Hoshutō
- Abbreviation: CPJ; Hoshutō
- Leader: Naoki Hyakuta
- Secretary General: Kaori Arimoto
- Founders: Naoki Hyakuta; Kaori Arimoto
- Founded: 1 September 2023; 3 years ago
- Headquarters: 5th Floor Kōjimachi sunrise Bldg. 2-2-31 Kōjimachi, Chiyoda, Tokyo, Japan
- Membership (April 2024): ▲65,000
- Ideology: Conservatism (Japanese); Ultranationalism; Right-wing populism
- Political position: Far-right
- Colours: Sky blue
- Slogan: 日本を豊かに、強く; Nippon o yutaka ni, tsuyoku ('Making Japan rich, strong')
- Senators: 2 / 248
- Representatives: 0 / 465
- Prefectural assembly members: 0 / 2,675
- City and town assembly members: 15 / 30,490

Website
- hoshuto.jp

The Conservative Party of Japan (Japanese: 日本保守党, Nippon Hoshutō; CPJ) is a conservative, Japanese ultranationalist and right-wing populist political party in Japan. It was founded by novelist Naoki Hyakuta and journalist Kaori Arimoto in 2023, following the passage of the LGBT Understanding Promotion Act. The party claims to "protect Japan's national polity and traditional culture". It is opposed to immigration, opposed to LGBTQ rights and uses historically revisionist rhetoric. Party leaders deny Japanese war crimes committed prior to and during the Second World War, such as the Nanjing Massacre.

The party is a far-right entity due to the predominance of far-right netizens among its membership. Founded by internet political commentators, the party's reliance on digital activism and the propagation of its viewpoints in online spaces solidify its reputation as a manifestation of the far-right movement in Japan. Multiple sources specifically state the party's political position as being far-right. The party has been the most followed Japanese political party on X (formerly Twitter) since September 2023.

The party opposes LGBT rights in Japan, immigration, and gender equality. It supports welfare chauvinism, revising the constitution, and a stronger foreign policy against China and North Korea. The party is regarded as being part of the neoconservative movement in Japan. The Asahi Shimbun noted that the party draws its support from individuals who were previously affiliated with the Liberal Democratic Party (LDP) who have grown dissatisfied with what they perceive as supposed moderate policies of recent LDP governments.

== History ==
Former logo until 2024.

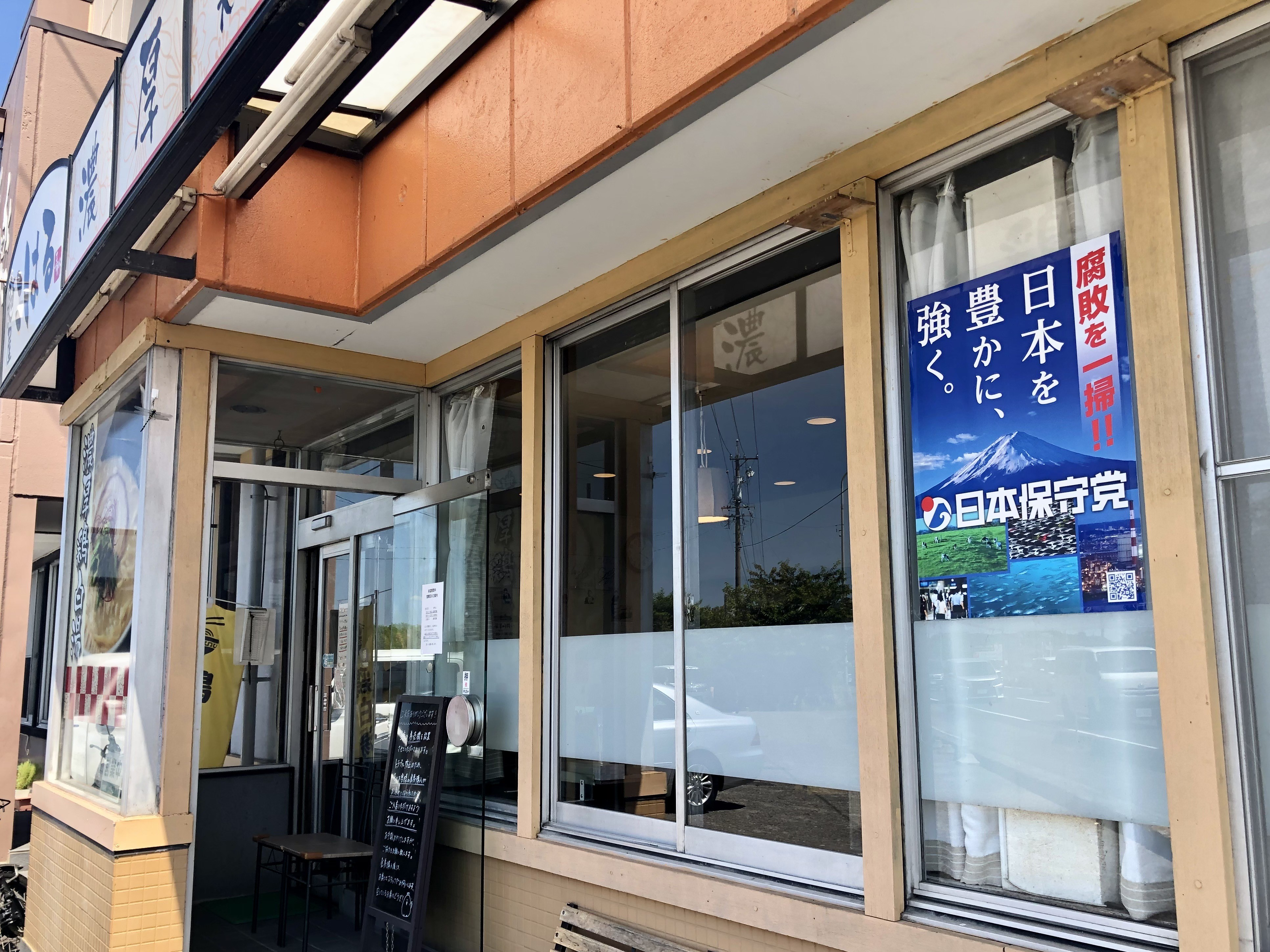
Conservative Party of Japan poster

On June 12, 2023, novelist and right-wing political commentator Naoki Hyakuta declared that he would run for the House of Representatives and form a new party if the LGBT Understanding Promotion Act, which at the time of his declaration was still in deliberations and debate in the National Diet, were to be passed. Four days later on June 16, the bill in question was passed by the House of Representatives and enacted. As a result, he announced the formation of the party alongside journalist and fellow right-wing political commentator Kaori Arimoto. The party was launched on September 1, 2023, with a provisional name "Hyakuta New Party" (百田新党), while clarifying that official activities are scheduled to begin in October 2023. On September 2, 2023, party leader Hyakuta announced that he would reveal the party's official name if the party's official X account reached 200,000 followers. On September 13, 2023, the aforementioned account reached its goal of 200,000 followers, and the party's official name, the "Conservative Party of Japan" was announced.

On September 14, 2023, Eiji Kosaka, a previously independent member of the Arakawa City Assembly, joined the Conservative Party, giving the party its first ever seat in local assemblies. On October 17, 2023, during the party's first press conference, it was announced that the Nagoya-based regional party Genzei Nippon will be affiliated with the party on a national level, with its founder and leader Takashi Kawamura, also the incumbent mayor of Nagoya, becoming the party's Deputy Leader.

In the 2025 Upper House election, the Conservative Party held two seats as they campaign for "zero sales tax for food" and "restriction of foreign immigrants".

Around the time of the election, there were reports of discord between Hyakuta and Kawamura over party management. In September 2025, Diet Member Yuko Takegami, who is close to Kawamura, left the party, citing conflict with Hyakuta and the exclusion of Kawamura from party management. Later that month, the party declared the dissolution of its relationship with Genzei Nippon and Kawamura was dismissed as co-leader. Kawamura was reportedly considering leaving and forming a new party.

== Ideology and policies ==
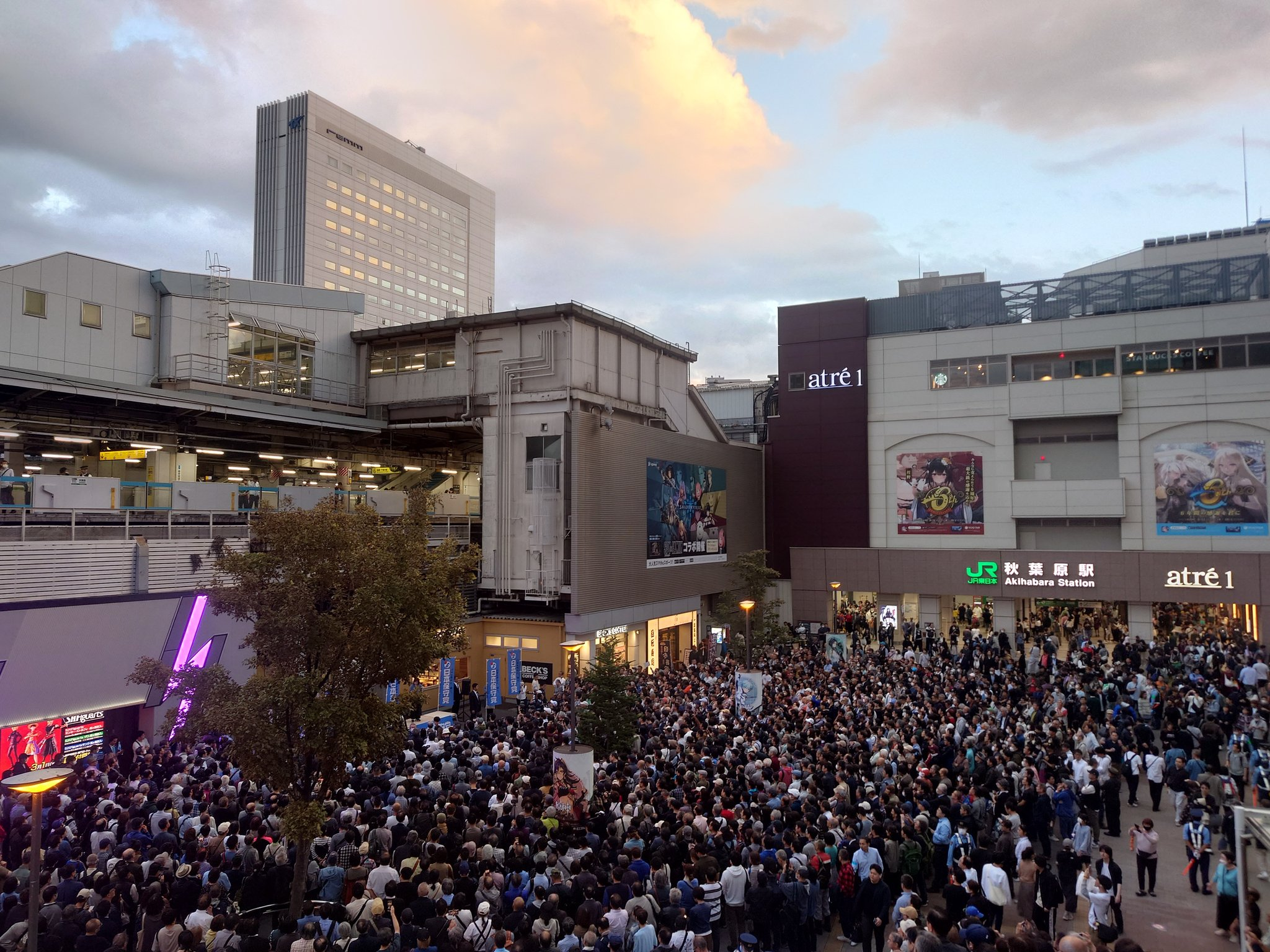
Conservative Party's street rally in Akihabara Station, Tokyo, 21 October 2023

The party asserts itself as a more right-wing alternative to the LDP and the Japan Innovation Party, the two main conservative parties in Japanese politics, with the party being formed after dissatisfaction arose towards the LDP following the election of Fumio Kishida as prime minister and LDP president in 2021 and the assassination of former prime minister and LDP president Shinzo Abe.

The party is opposed to gender equality, same-sex marriage and LGBT rights. It supports the revision of the LGBT Understanding Promotion Act, including the removal of provisions regarding LGBT-related education for children.

The party is in favour of revising Article 9 of the Japanese Constitution such as removing Section 2, which prohibits Japan from having a standing military force. The party is in favour of expanding sanctions against North Korea, such as to Chongryon-related organizations. The party is in favour of establishing stronger Japan–Taiwan relations and has proposed to establish a Japanese counterpart to the Taiwan Relations Act.

The party is opposed to immigration and supports revising the Immigration Control and Refugee Recognition Act, which would allow authorities to detain and deport refugees who have been denied asylum. The party also advocates for review of the government's immigration policy, such as its decision to expand the number of specified skilled foreign workers and international students. The party is in favour of amending the Health Insurance Act in order to have a separate health insurance system for foreign residents. Julian Ryall writing for Deutsche Welle in July 2025 said that the Conservative Party of Japan's immigration policies are similar to those of the far-right Alternative for Germany.

The party vows to stop Japanese politics from becoming a "family business," such as by reducing the annual income of members of the Diet and local councilors to the salaries comparable to ordinary citizens.

The party is also for nuclear energy.

== Supporters ==
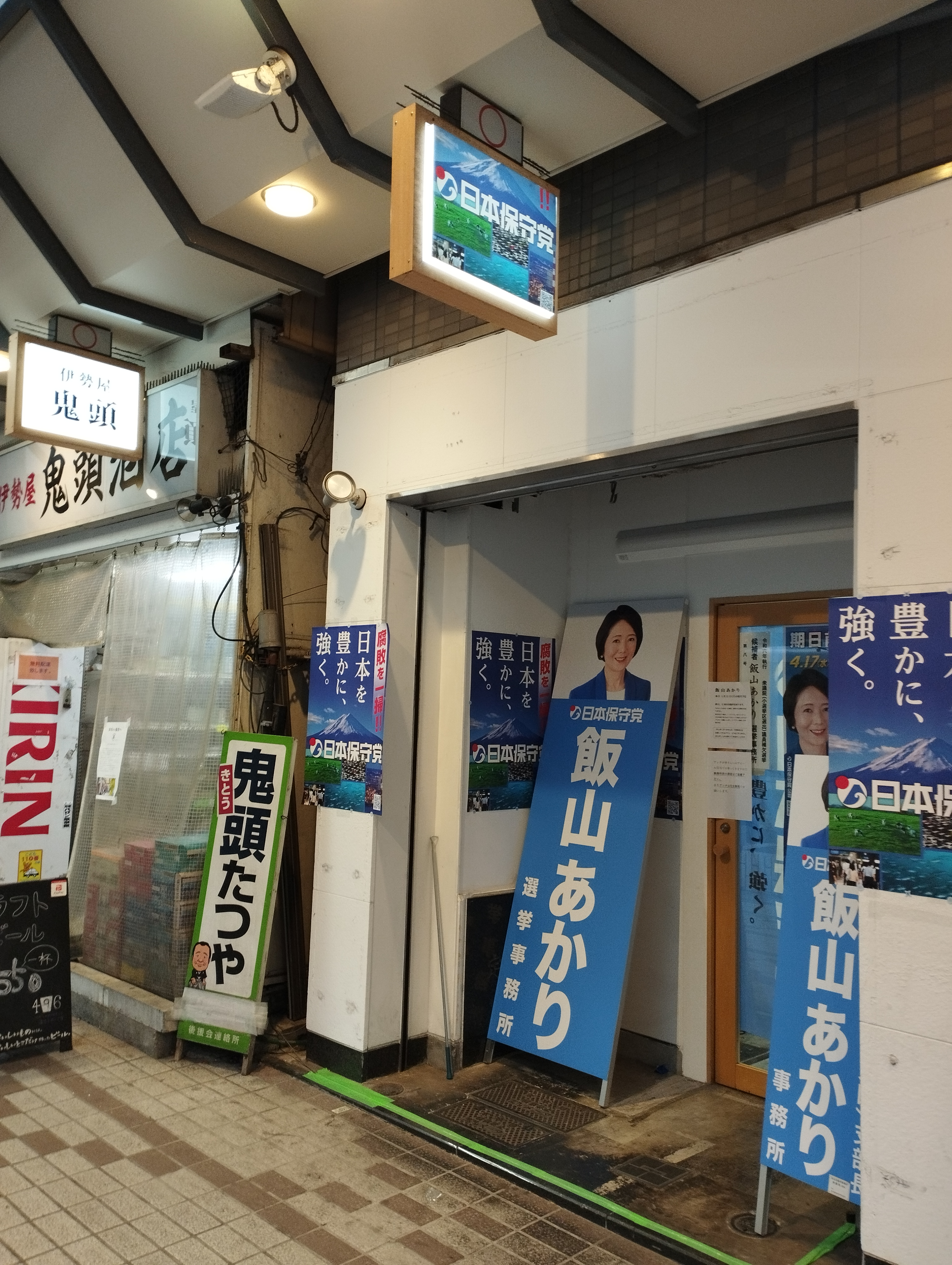
Office of the Conservative Party in Kōtō, 2024

The party's primary origin of support come from Japanese netizens, particularly those from the right-wing. With party founders Hyakuta and Arimoto both themselves being influential figures in Japan's internet right-wing as political commentators, having an active following on various social media and video-sharing platforms such as YouTube, Twitter and Niconico through their ultraconservative views on social and political issues. The party is supported by conservatives who have been disappointed with the current state of the Liberal Democratic Party ever since Prime Minister Fumio Kishida took power in 2021, claiming that the party had become too lenient on issues such as LGBT rights, immigration, and foreign policy. Liberal Democratic Party officials have expressed concern that they might lose voters to the Conservative Party as a result.

Despite the party's large presence online, it fails to attract support among ordinary voters. According to surveys conducted by the JX News Agency in October 2023, 74.8% did not know of the party's existence, 18.4% responded that they knew of the party's existence but will not vote for them, and only 6.9% responded that they both knew of the party's existence and are planning on voting for them. According to the same surveys, the majority of the party's supporters are males in their 50s and 60s, and a large fraction of the respondents who answered that they will support the party previously voted for Sanseitō, a far-right party, and the Democratic Party for the People, a centre-right party in past elections.

== Controversy ==
=== Anti-Korean sentiment ===
On October 30, 2023, party leader Hyakuta and secretary general Arimoto made derogatory remarks against the Korean people on a Niconico live stream, with both stating that the "Korean people are human scum" and "I want to sever diplomatic relations with South Korea and go to war."

=== Discrimination of sexual and gender minorities ===
The party participated in the 2024 by-elections in the Tokyo 15th district with Islamic researcher and activist Akari Iiyama as its candidate. As a result, a number of their supporters from various regions, despite not being constituents of the district, actively engaged in the party's street rallies and stump speeches. However, the party's advocacy of anti-LGBT sentiment and rhetoric resulted in the distribution of leaflets and posters, as well as megaphone speeches containing discriminatory remarks against sexual and gender minorities throughout the constituency under the context of campaigning. As a result, the local activist group Crossover Koto condemned the party, stating that they felt "anger, anxiety, and sense of helplessness." The group also highlighted instances where members of the city's LGBT community were unable to leave their residences out of fear.

The party got 14.2% of the vote, coming 4th.

=== Historical negationism ===
Hyakuta, in an interview with AbemaTV, attempted to justify Japan's involvement in the Second World War by claiming that Japan "liberated" Southeast Asia from Western imperialism at the time. He later stated that if it hadn't been for Japan, the world today would be "similar to hell," with much of Asia still under Western colonial rule. Hyakuta has also said that the Nanjing Massacre by Japanese soldiers didn't happen.

=== Denial of women's reproductive rights ===
Addressing the declining birth rate issue in Japan, Hyakuta described a society where "women are not allowed to attend university after the age of 18," "women who are single at 25 are not allowed to marry," and "women who have not given birth by the age of 30 are forced to undergo a hysterectomy." The comment prompted fierce public backlash and rebuttal from celebrities, and Hyakuta was forced to apologize.

== Leaders ==
Position	Name
Leader	Naoki Hyakuta
Secretary General	Kaori Arimoto

=== List of leaders ===
No.	Leader (birth–death)	Constituency	Took office	Left office	Election results
1	Naoki Hyakuta (b. 1956)	Cou for National PR (since 29 July 2025)	1 September 2023	Incumbent	N/A

== Election results ==
=== House of Representatives ===
House of Representatives
Election	Leader	No. of candidates	Seats			Position	Constituency votes		PR Block votes		Status
Election	Leader	No. of candidates	No.	±	Share	Position	No.	Share	No.	Share	Status
2024	Naoki Hyakuta	30	3 / 465	▲3	0.6%	9th	155,837	0.29%	1,145,622	2.10%	Opposition
2026	Naoki Hyakuta	20	0 / 465	▼3	0.0%	10th	97,753	0.17%	1,455,563	2.54%	Extra-parliamentary

=== House of Councillors ===
Election	Leader	Constituency			Party list			Seats				Position	Status
Election	Leader	Votes	%	Seats	Votes	%	Seats	Election	+/-	Total	+/-	Position	Status
2025	Naoki Hyakuta	652,266	1.10	0 / 75	2,982,093	5.04	2 / 50	2 / 125	New	2 / 248	New	9th	Opposition

=== By-elections ===
Election	Leader	Constituency	Candidate	Votes	%	Position	Status
2024	Naoki Hyakuta	Tokyo 15th	Akari Iiyama	24,264	14.2	4th	Lost
