= Mizuho-ku =

Mizuho 瑞穂区
- Ward
- Mizuho Ward
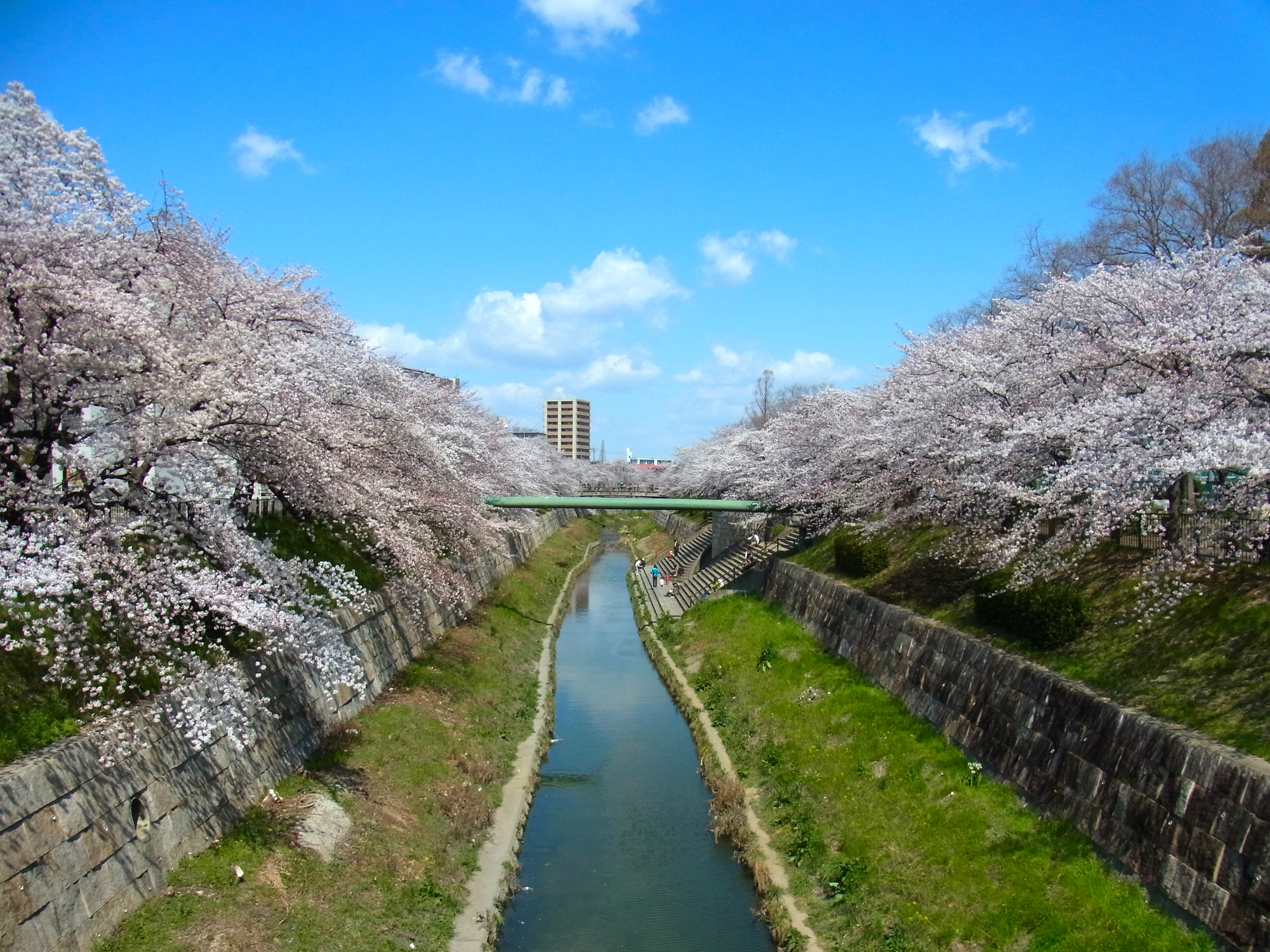
- Yamazaki River

- Location of Mizuho-ku in Nagoya

- Coordinates: 35°07′54″N 136°56′06″E
- Country: Japan
- Region: Tōkai region Chūbu region
- Prefecture: Aichi

Area
  - Total: 11.22 km^{2} (4.33 sq mi)

Population (October 1, 2019)
  - Total: 107,622
  - Density: 9,592/km^{2} (24,840/sq mi)
- Time zone: UTC+9 (Japan Standard Time)
- Tree: Cherry blossom
- Flower: Cherry blossom
- Phone number: 052-841-1521
- Address: 3-23 Mizuho-dori, Mizuho-ku, Nagoya-shi, Aichi-ken 467-8531
- Website: www.city.nagoya.jp/mizuho/ (in Japanese)

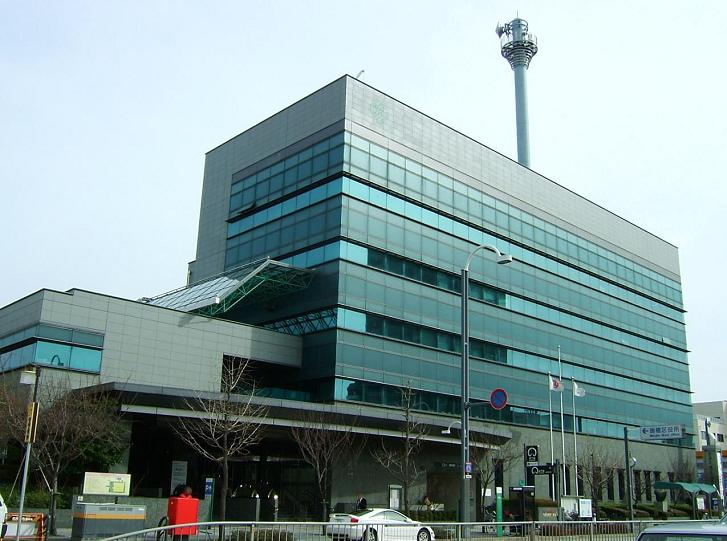
Mizuho-ku Ward Office

Mizuho (瑞穂区, Mizuho-ku) is one of the 16 wards of the city of Nagoya in Aichi Prefecture, Japan. As of 1 October 2019, the ward had an estimated population of 107,622 and a population density of 9,592 persons per km². The total area was 11.22 km².

== Geography ==
Mizuho Ward is located near the geographic center of Nagoya city.

=== Surrounding municipalities ===
- Showa Ward
- Atsuta Ward
- Tenpaku Ward
- Minami Ward

== History ==
Mizuho District was established on February 11, 1944 from the eastern portion of Atsuka-ku.

== Education ==
- Nagoya City University
- Nagoya Women's University
- Aichi Mizuho College

== Transportation ==
=== Railroads ===
- Meitetsu - Nagoya Main Line
  - Horita
- Nagoya Municipal Subway - Sakura-dōri Line
  - Sakurayama - Mizuho Kuyakusho - Mizuho Undōjō Nishi -

Aratama-bashi

- Nagoya Municipal Subway - Meijō Line
  - Sōgō Rihabiri Center - Mizuho Undōjō Higashi - Aratama-bashi

=== Highways ===
- Route 3 (Nagoya Expressway)
- National Route 1

== Local attractions ==
- Nagoya City Museum
- Mizuho Kofun Group
- Mizuho rugby stadium.
