= Aratama-bashi Station =

Metro station in Nagoya, Japan

Coordinates: 35.1177°N 136.9364°E

M23 S14 Aratama-bashi Station 新瑞橋駅
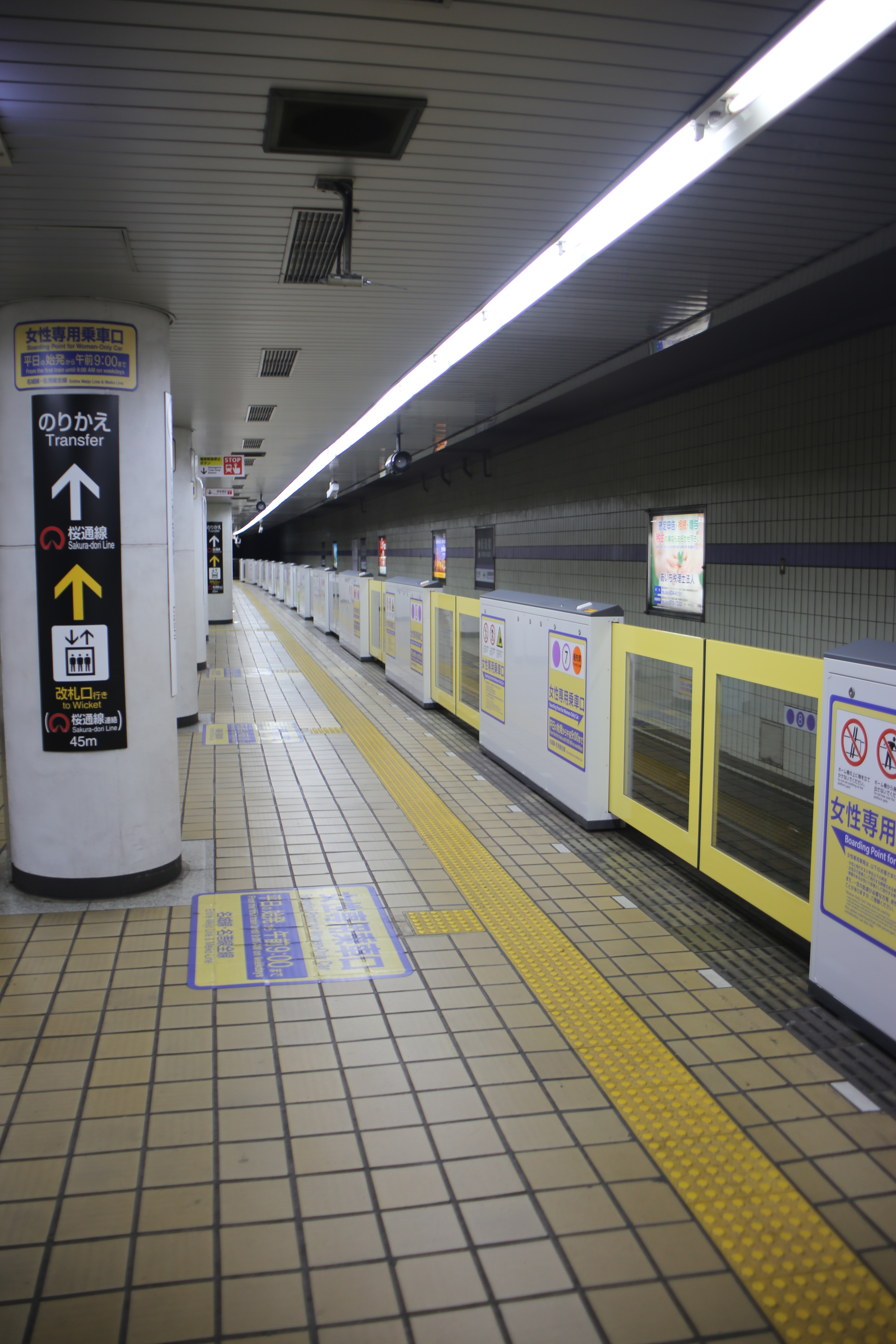
- Meijō Line platforms, 16 January 2020

General information
- Location: 2-23 Suyama-cho, Mizuho, Nagoya, Aichi （名古屋市瑞穂区洲山町二丁目23） Japan
- System: Nagoya Municipal Subway station
- Operator: Transportation Bureau City of Nagoya
- Lines: Meijō Line; Sakura-dōri Line
- Connections: Bus terminal

Other information
- Station code: M23; S14

History
- Opened: 30 March 1974; 52 years ago

Passengers
- 2009: 11,218 daily

Services
Preceding station	Nagoya Municipal Subway	Following station
Mizuho Undōjō Higashi M22 anticlockwise	Meijō Line	Myōon-dōri M24 clockwise
Mizuho Undōjō Nishi S13 towards Taiko-dori	Sakura-dōri Line	Sakura-hommachi S15 towards Tokushige
Location

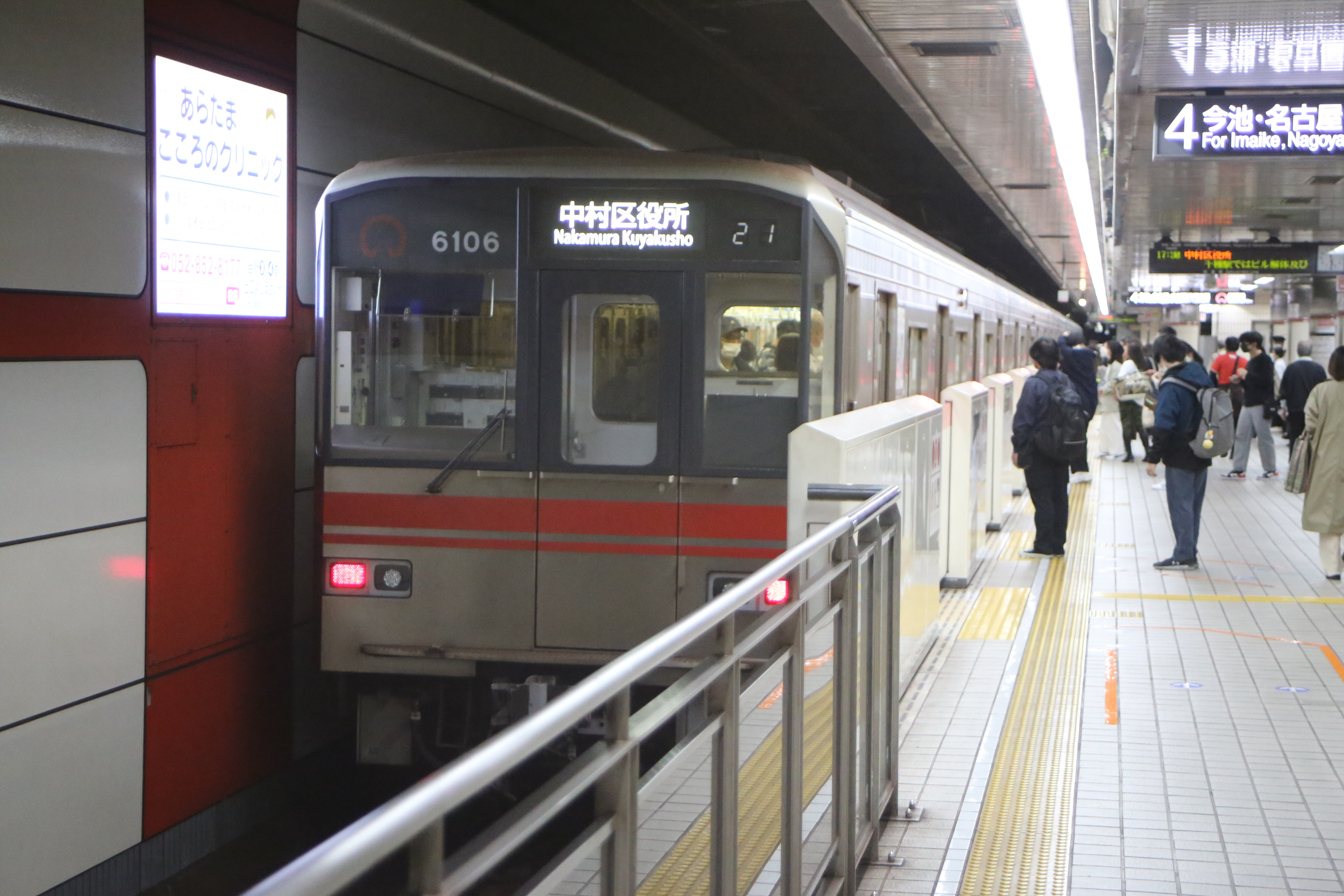
Sakura-dōri Line platforms, 3 November 2022

Aratama-bashi Station (新瑞橋駅, Aratama-bashi-eki) is an underground Interchange metro station located in Mizuho-ku, Nagoya, Aichi Prefecture, Japan operated by the Nagoya Municipal Subway. Meijō Line. It is located 20.7 kilometers from the terminus of the Meijō Line at Kanayama Station and 11.8 kilometers from the terminus of the Sakura-dōri Line at Taiko-dori Station.

== History ==
Aratama-bashi Station was opened on 30 March 1974 as the terminal station for the Nagoya Municipal Subway Line No.4, which was later renamed the Meijō Line. The Sakura-dōri Line connected to the station on 30 March 1994. The Meijō Line was extended to Nagoya Daigaku Station on 6 October 2004.

== Lines ==
- Nagoya Municipal Subway
  - Meijō Line (Station number: M23)
  - Sakura-dōri Line (Station number: S14)

== Layout ==
Aratama-bashi Station has two underground island platforms.

=== Platforms ===
1	■ Meijō Line	For Yagoto and Motoyama
2	■ Meijō Line	For Kanayama and Sakae
3	■ Sakura-dōri Line	For Tokushige
4	■ Sakura-dōri Line	For Imaike, Nagoya, and Taiko-dori
