= Aichi Prefectural Ceramic Museum =

Museum in Seto city, Aichi, Japan

- 愛知県陶磁美術館
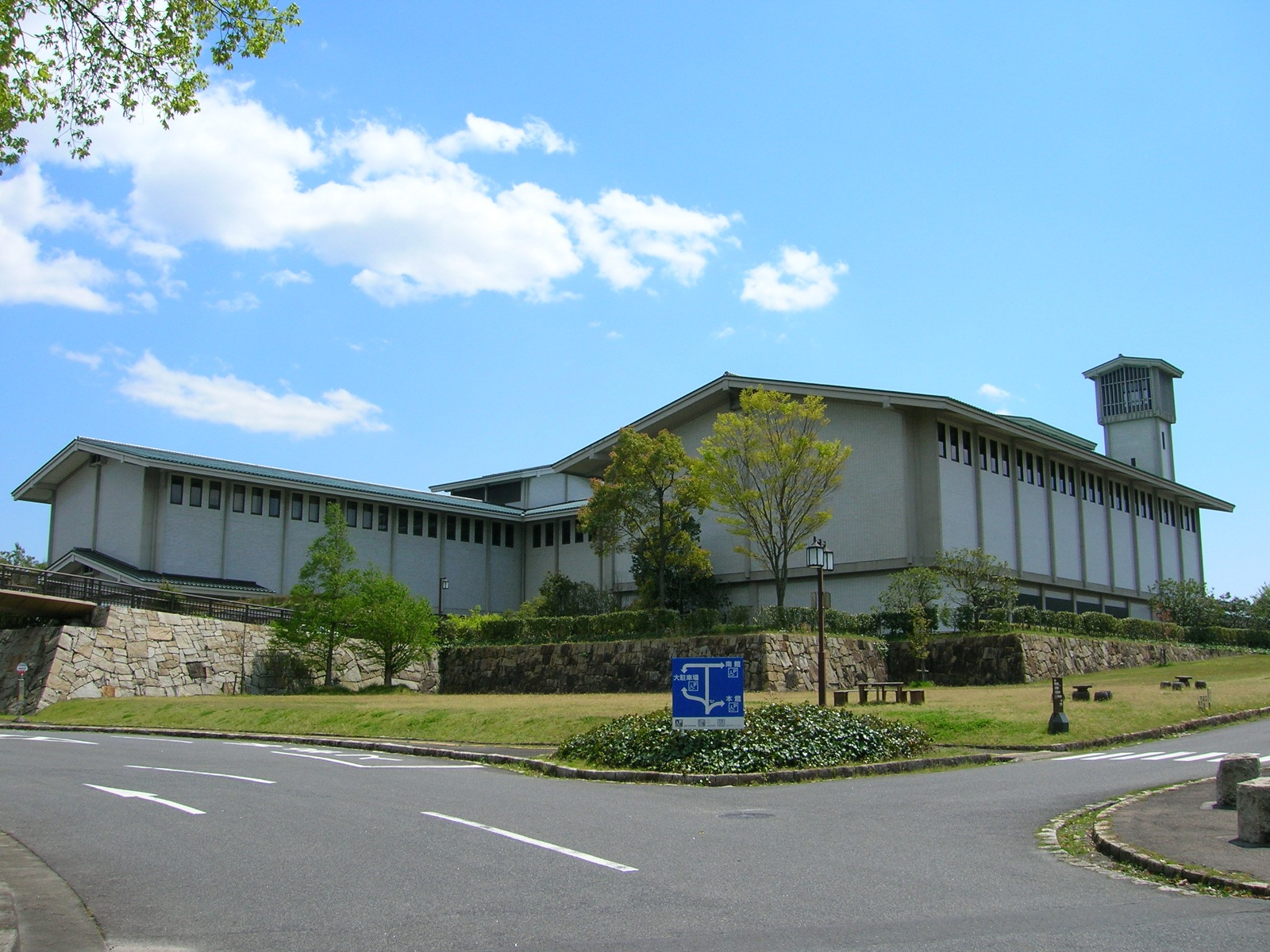
- Aichi Prefectural Ceramic Museum main building

- Location within Aichi Prefecture Location within Japan
- Established: 1 June 1978
- Location: Seto, Aichi Japan
- Coordinates: 35°11′09″N 137°05′53″E
- Collection size: 7020 items
- Architect: Taniguchi Yoshirō
- Owner: Aichi Prefecture

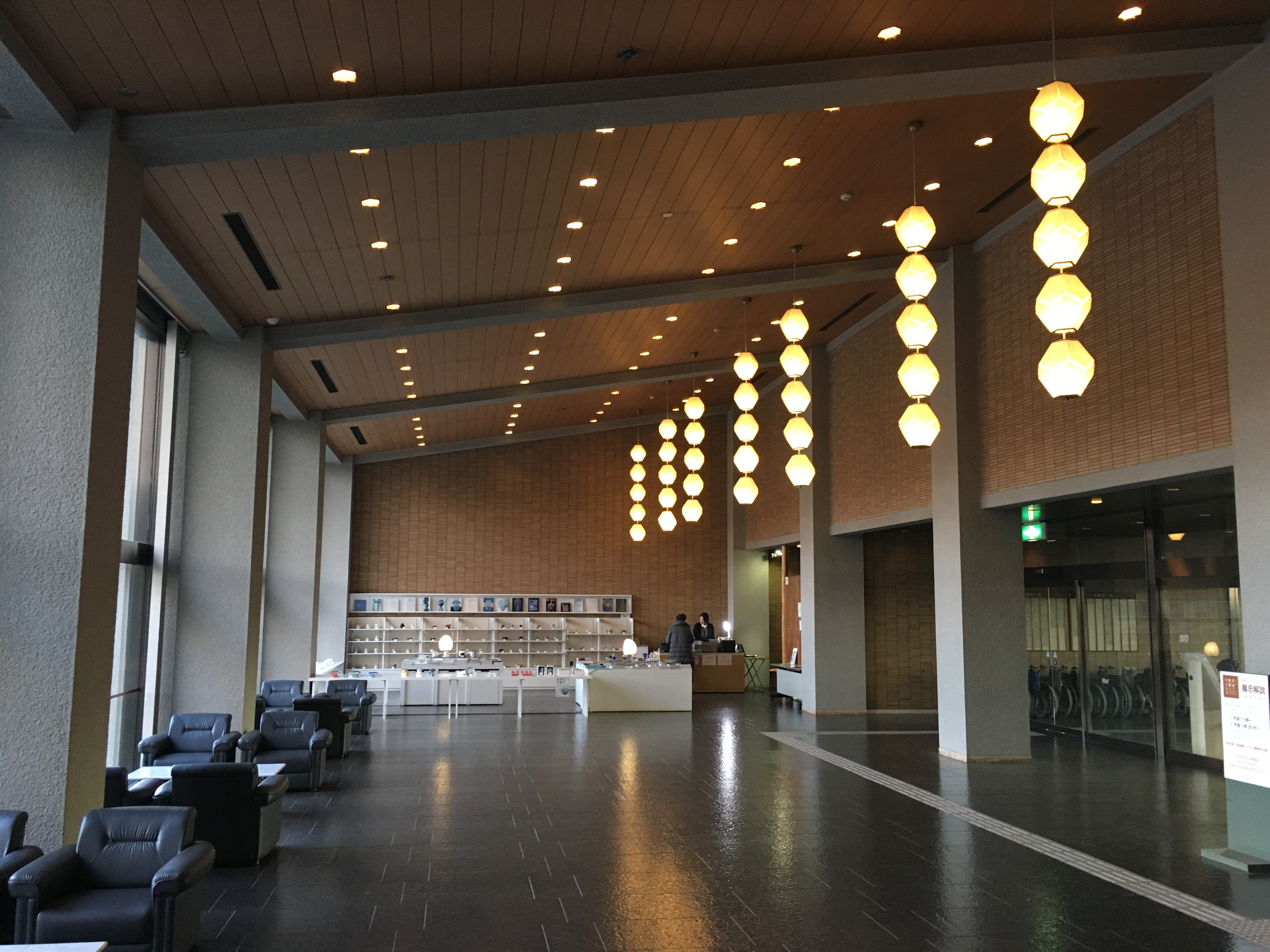
Lobby of the main building

The Aichi Prefectural Ceramic Museum (愛知県陶磁美術館, Aichi-ken Tōji bijutsukan) is a prefectural art museum located in the city of Seto, north of the metropolis of Nagoya in central Japan. This museum was formally named "Aichi-ken Toji Shiryokan (愛知県陶磁資料館)", but the name in English has been the same as before.

== Overview ==
The museum was established in 1978 to showcase the history of Japanese pottery found in the area of Owari Province, today part of Aichi Prefecture. The main building and the southern annex were designed by renowned architect Taniguchi Yoshirō.

The collection of over 7000 items ranges from the Jōmon period (circa 10,000 BC - circa 300 BC) to contemporary ceramics produced by some of Japan's most famous potters, detailing Japan's rich ceramic art history. Some of the works in the collection are designated as Important Cultural Properties of Japan.

The museum is located in the city of Seto, Aichi, which is renowned for producing Seto ware ceramics since over 1,000 years. Located in the museum is a library, restaurant, a traditional Japanese tea ceremony room where visitors can drink from tea bowls made by famous artists and a studio for guests where they can try making and decorating their own pottery.

Access by public transport is from Fujigaoka Station on the Higashiyama Line subway and by Meitetsu Bus to Toji Shiryokan (Ceramic Museum) stop or Tōji-shiryōkan-minami Station on the Linimo.

== See also ==
- List of museums in Japan
