= Nagakute Kosenjō Station =

Maglev station in Nagakute, Aichi Prefecture, Japan

Nagakute Kosenjō Station 長久手古戦場駅

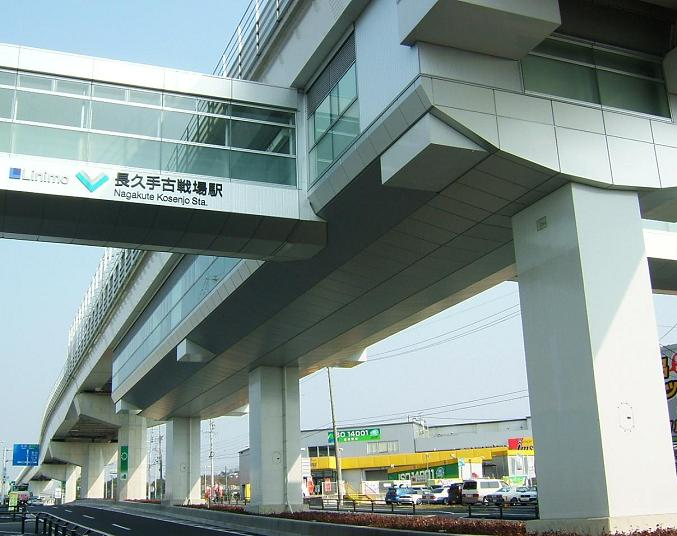
- Nagakute Kosenjō Station

General information
- Location: Yoko-dori 41, Nagakute-shi, Aichi-ken; Japan
- Coordinates: 35.1717°N 137.0498°E
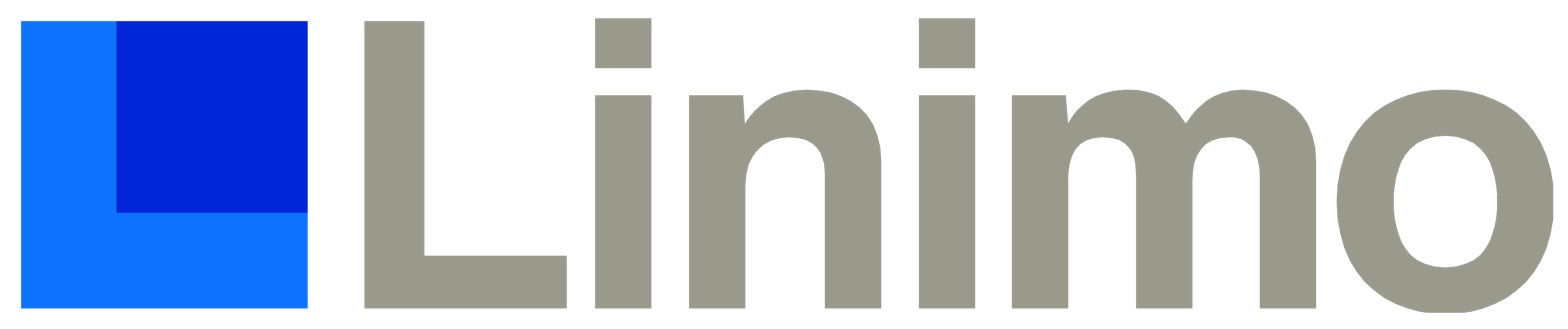
- System: Aichi Rapid Transit station
- Line: ■ Linimo
- Distance: 3.4 kilometers from Fujigaoka
- Platforms: 1 island platform

Other information
- Status: Staffed
- Station code: L04
- Website: Official website

History
- Opened: March 6, 2005

Passengers
- FY2017: 6,888
Location
- Location within Aichi Prefecture Location within Japan

Nagakute Kosenjō Station (長久手古戦場駅, Nagakute Kosenjō-eki) is a railway station in city of Nagakute, Aichi Prefecture, Japan operated by the Aichi Rapid Transit Company.

== Lines ==
Nagakute Kosenjō Station is served by urban maglev Linimo line, and is located 3.4 kilometers from the starting point of the line at Fujigaoka.

== Layout ==
The station has one elevated island platform with the station building underneath. The station building has automated ticket machines, Manaca automated turnstiles and is staffed. The station is equipped with platform screen doors.

=== Platforms ===
1	■ Linimo	For Yakusa
2	■ Linimo	For Fujigaoka

== Adjacent stations ==
«	Service	»
Linimo
Irigaike-kōen	-	Geidai-dōri

== Station history ==
The station was opened on March 6, 2005; 21 years ago.

== Passenger statistics ==
In fiscal 2017, the station was used by 6,888 passengers daily.

== Surrounding area ==
- Nagakute Historical Museum
- Chinoike Park

== See also ==
- List of railway stations in Japan
