= Irigaike-kōen Station =

Maglev station in Nagakute, Aichi Prefecture, Japan

Irigaike-kōen Station 杁ヶ池公園駅

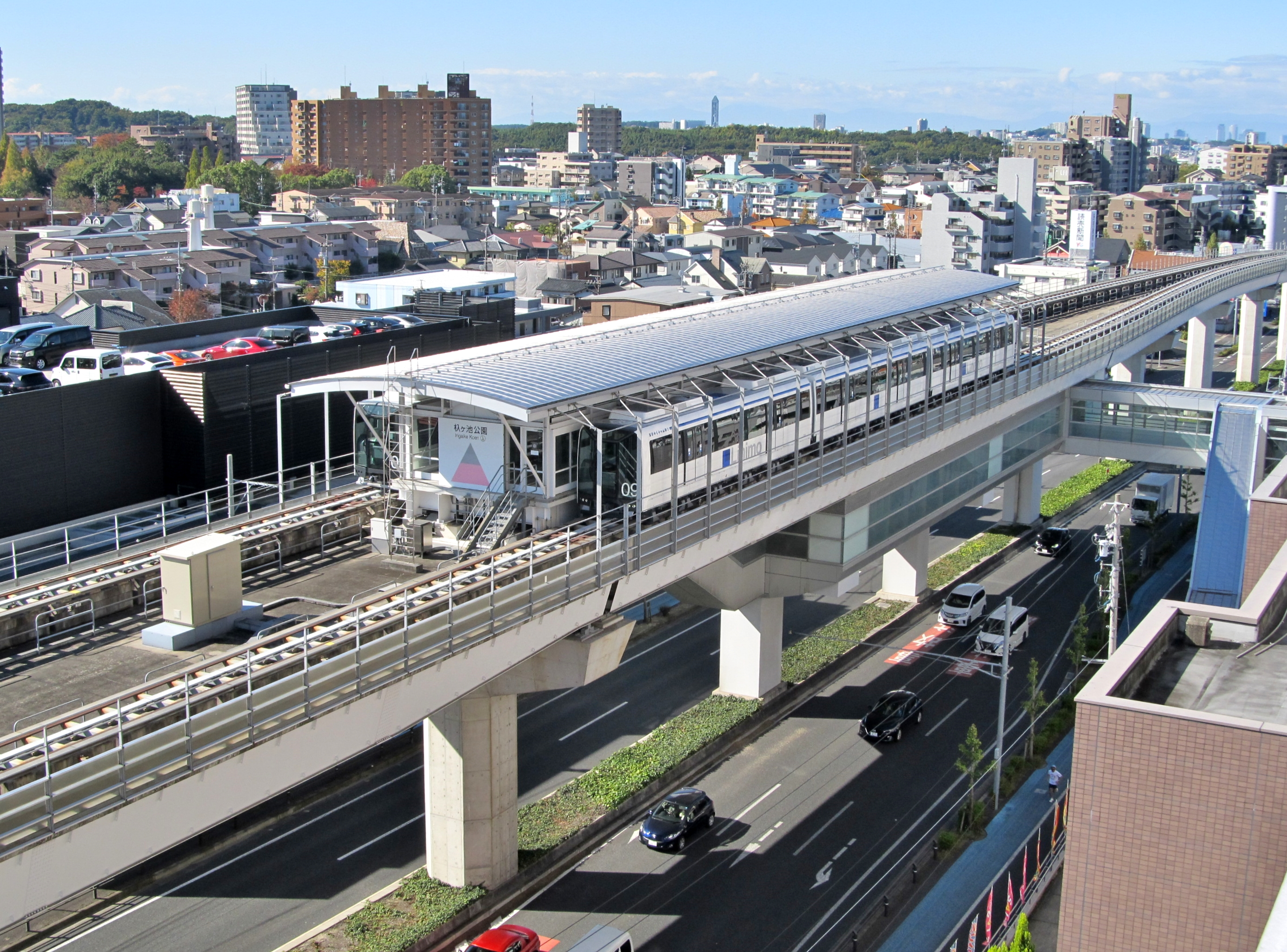
- Linimo at Irigaike-kōen Station

General information
- Location: Ireigaike, Nagakute-shi, Aichi-ken; Japan
- Coordinates: 35.1718°N 137.038°E
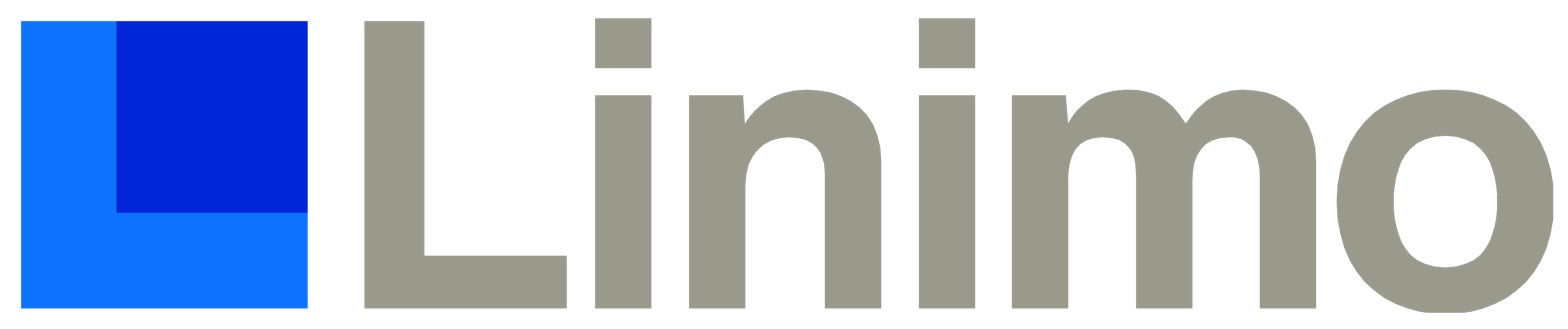
- System: Aichi Rapid Transit station
- Line: ■ Linimo
- Distance: 2.3 kilometers from Fujigaoka
- Platforms: 1 island platform

Other information
- Status: Staffed
- Station code: L03
- Website: Official website

History
- Opened: March 6, 2005

Passengers
- FY2017: 3,263
Location
- Location within Aichi Prefecture Location within Japan

Irigaike-kōen Station (杁ヶ池公園駅, Irigaike-kōen-eki) is a railway station in city of Nagakute, Aichi Prefecture, Japan operated by the Aichi Rapid Transit Company.

== Lines ==
Irigaike-kōen Station is served by urban maglev Linimo line, and is located 2.3 kilometers from the starting point of the line at Fujigaoka.

== Layout ==
The station has one elevated island platform with the station building underneath. The station building has automated ticket machines, Manaca automated turnstiles and is staffed. The station is equipped with platform screen doors.

=== Platforms ===
1	■ Linimo	For Yakusa
2	■ Linimo	For Fujigaoka

== Adjacent stations ==
«	Service	»
Linimo
Hanamizuki-dōri	-	Nagakute Kosenjō

== Station history ==
The station was opened on March 6, 2005; 21 years ago.

== Passenger statistics ==
In fiscal 2017, the station was used by 3,263 passengers daily.

== Surrounding area ==
- Meito Art Museum
- Irigaike Park

== See also ==
- List of railway stations in Japan
