= Geidai-dōri Station =

Maglev station in Nagakute, Aichi Prefecture, Japan

Geidai-dōri Station 芸大通駅

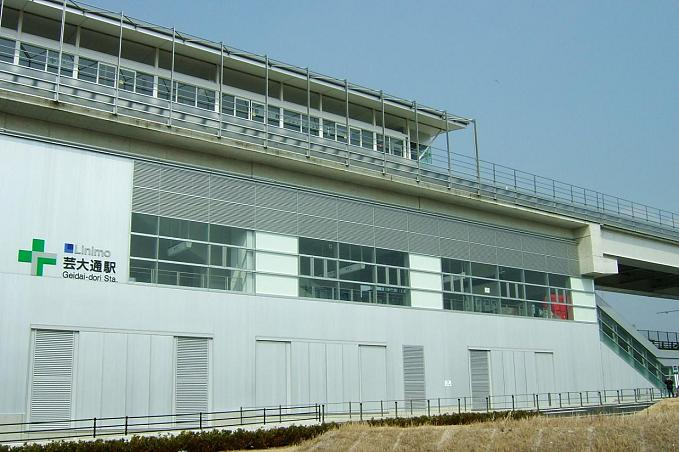
- Geidai-dōri Station

General information
- Location: Iwasaku, Nagakute-shi, Aichi-ken; Japan
- Coordinates: 35.1722°N 137.0609°E
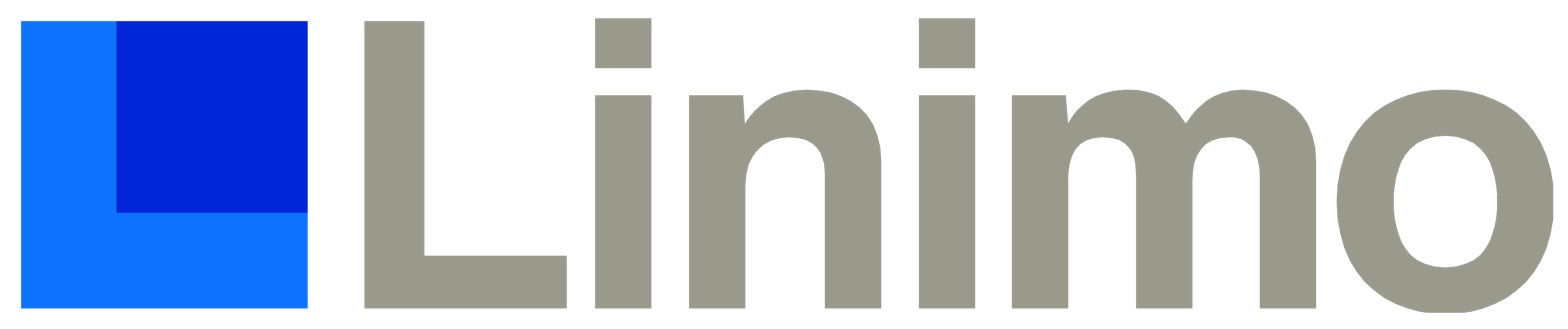
- System: Aichi Rapid Transit station
- Line: ■ Linimo
- Distance: 4.5 kilometers from Fujigaoka
- Platforms: 1 island platform

Other information
- Status: Staffed
- Station code: L05
- Website: Official website

History
- Opened: March 6, 2005

Passengers
- FY2017: 2,095
Location
- Location within Aichi Prefecture Location within Japan

Geidai-dōri Station (芸大通駅, Geidai-dōri-eki) is a railway station in city of Nagakute, Aichi Prefecture, Japan operated by the Aichi Rapid Transit Company.

== Lines ==
Geidai-dōri Station is served by urban maglev Linimo line, and is located 4.5 kilometers from the starting point of the line at Fujigaoka.

== Layout ==
The station has one elevated island platform with the station building underneath. The station building has automated ticket machines, Manaca automated turnstiles and is staffed. The station is equipped with platform screen doors.

=== Platforms ===
1	■ Linimo	For Yakusa
2	■ Linimo	For Fujigaoka

== Adjacent stations ==
«	Service	»
Linimo
Nagakute Kosenjō	-	Kōen-nishi

== Station history ==
The station was opened on March 6, 2005; 21 years ago.

== Passenger statistics ==
In fiscal 2017, the station was used by 2,096 passengers daily.

== Surrounding area ==
- Aichi Prefectural University of Fine Arts and Music
- Toyota Automobile Museum
- Toyota Central R&D Labs., Inc.

== See also ==
- List of railway stations in Japan
