= Kōen-nishi Station =

Maglev station in Nagakute, Aichi Prefecture, Japan

Kōen-nishi Station 公園西駅

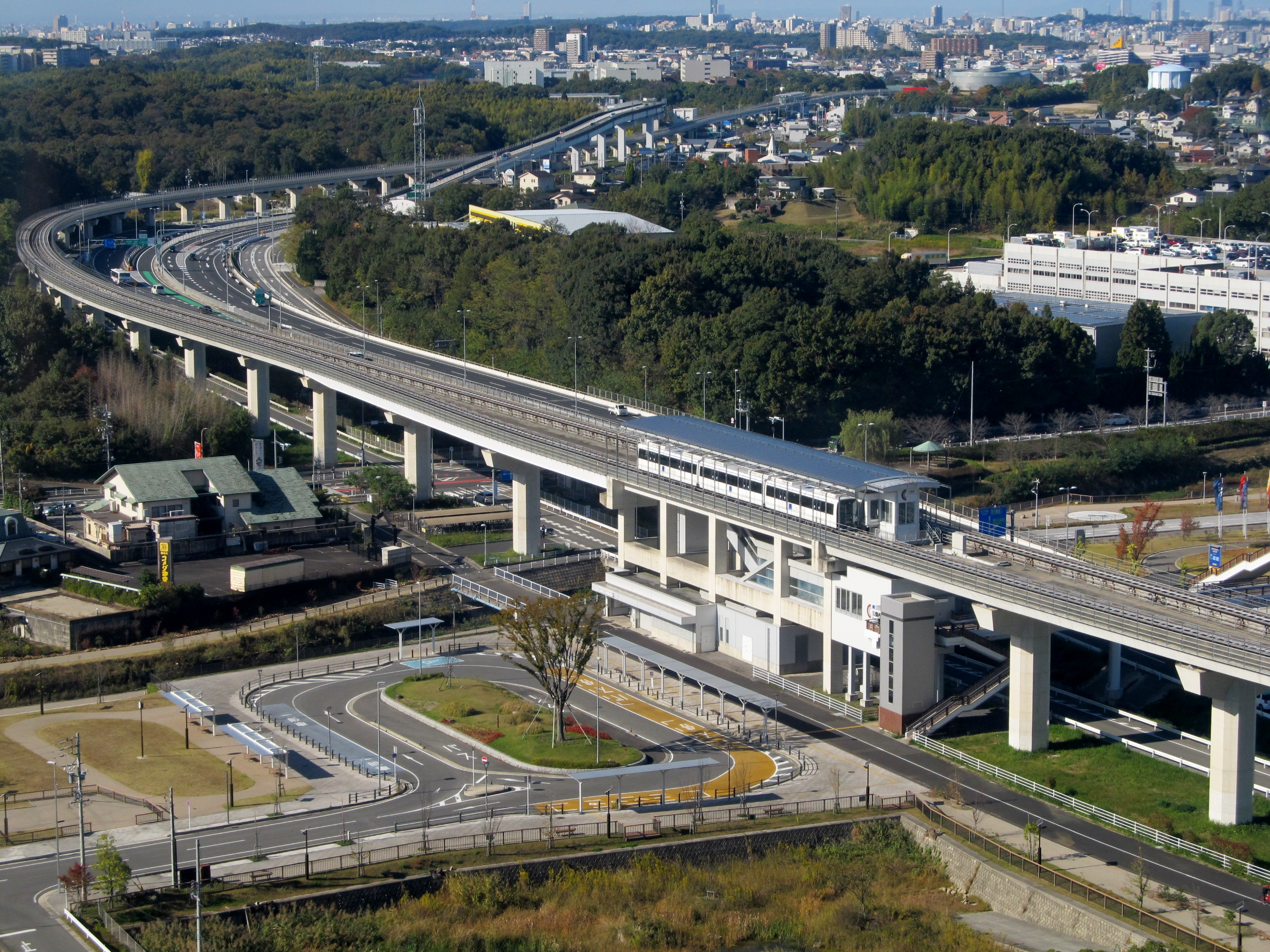
- Aerial overview in 2022

General information
- Location: Maruyama, Nagakute-shi, Aich-ken; Japan
- Coordinates: 35.1742°N 137.0765°E
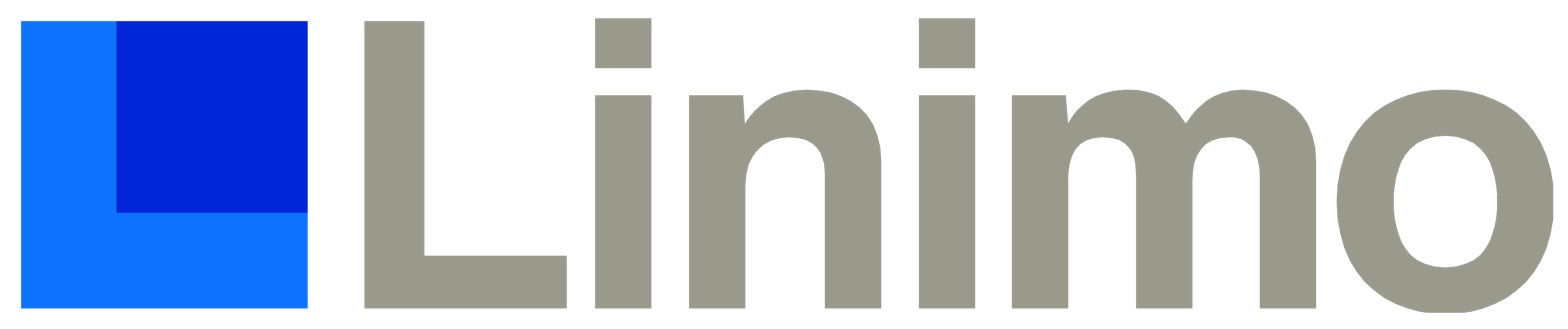
- System: Aichi Rapid Transit station
- Line: ■ Linimo
- Distance: 6.0 kilometers from Fujigaoka
- Platforms: 1 island platform

Other information
- Status: Staffed
- Station code: L06
- Website: Official website

History
- Opened: March 6, 2005

Passengers
- FY2017: 2,573
Location
- Location within Aichi Prefecture Location within Japan

Kōen-nishi Station (公園西駅, Kōen-nishi-eki) is a railway station in city of Nagakute, Aichi Prefecture, Japan operated by the Aichi Rapid Transit Company.

== Lines ==
Kōen-nishi Station is served by the urban maglev Linimo line, and is located 6.0 kilometers from the starting point of the line at Fujigaoka.

== Layout ==
The station has one elevated island platform with the station building underneath. The station building has automated ticket machines, Manaca automated turnstiles and is staffed. The station is equipped with platform screen doors.

=== Platforms ===
1	■ Linimo	For Yakusa
2	■ Linimo	For Fujigaoka

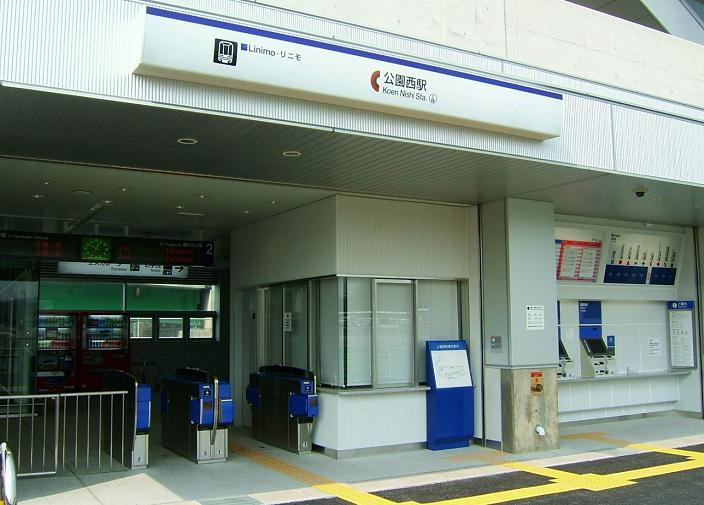
The station entrance

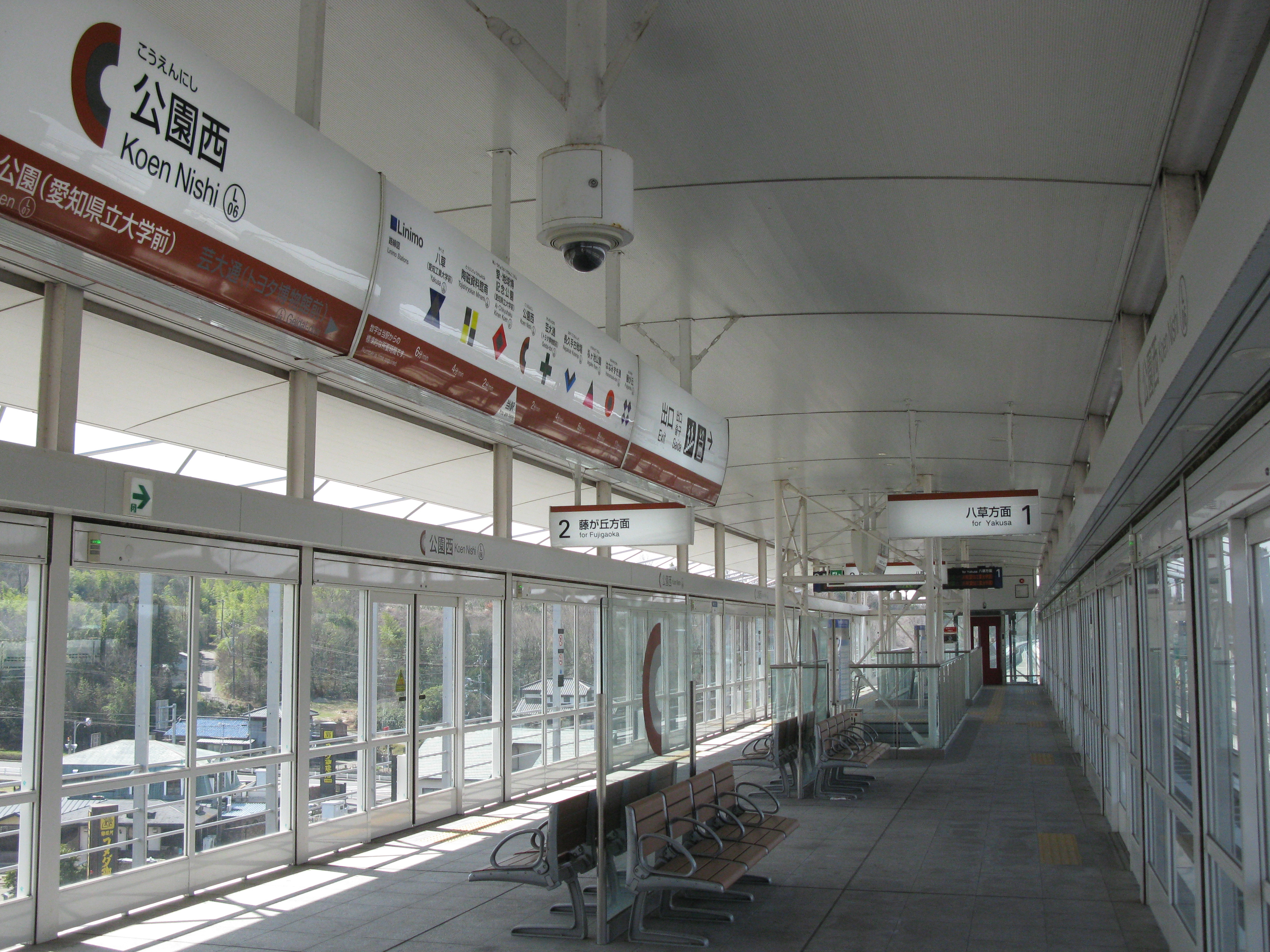
The station platform

== Adjacent stations ==
«	Service	»
Linimo
Geidai-dōri	-	Aichikyuhaku-kinen-kōen

== Station history ==
The station was opened on March 6, 2005; 21 years ago.

== Passenger statistics ==
In fiscal 2017, the station was used by 2,573 passengers daily.

== Surrounding area ==
- Nagoya University of Commerce & Business

== See also ==
- List of railway stations in Japan
