= Nagakute =

Nagakute 長久手市
- City
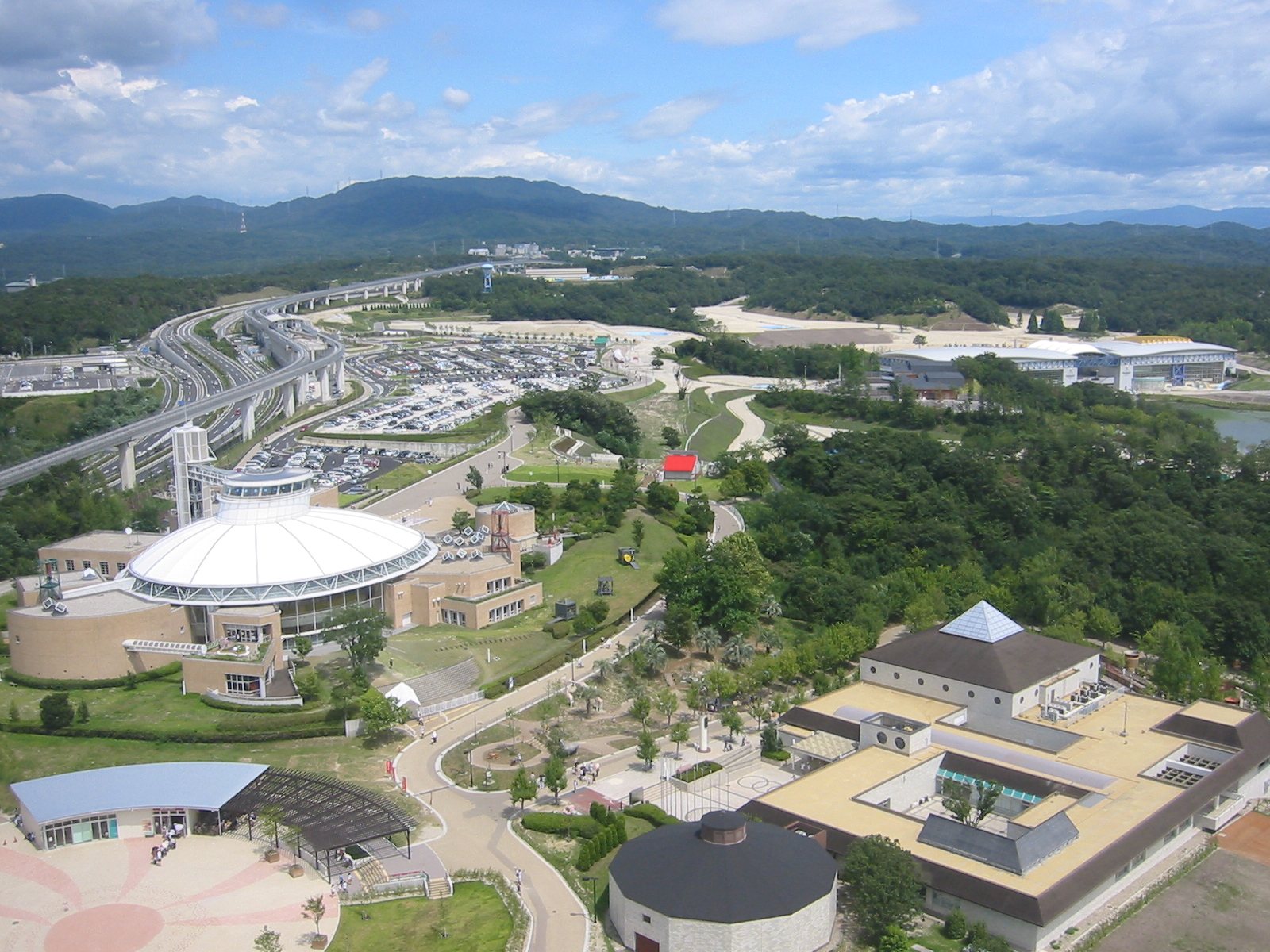
- Site of Expo 2005

- Flag Seal

- Location of Nagakute in Aichi Prefecture

- Coordinates: 35°11′2.4″N 137°02′55.3″E
- Country: Japan
- Region: Chūbu (Tōkai)
- Prefecture: Aichi

Government
  - Mayor: Yumi Satō

Area
  - Total: 21.55 km^{2} (8.32 sq mi)

Population (October 1, 2019)
  - Total: 61,503
  - Density: 2,854/km^{2} (7,392/sq mi)
- Time zone: UTC+9 (Japan Standard Time)
- Tree: Maple
- Flower: Satsuki azalea
- Phone number: 0561-63-1111
- Address: 60-1 Yazako, Shironouchi, Nagakute-shi, Aichi, Japan 480-1196
- Website: Official website

Nagakute (長久手市, Nagakute-shi) is a city located in Aichi Prefecture, Japan. As of 1 October 2019, the city had an estimated population of 61,503 in 24,352 households, and a population density of 2,854 persons per km^{2}. The total area of the city is 21.55 square kilometres (8.32 sq mi). Nagakute is a member of the World Health Organization’s Alliance for Healthy Cities (AFHC).

== Geography ==
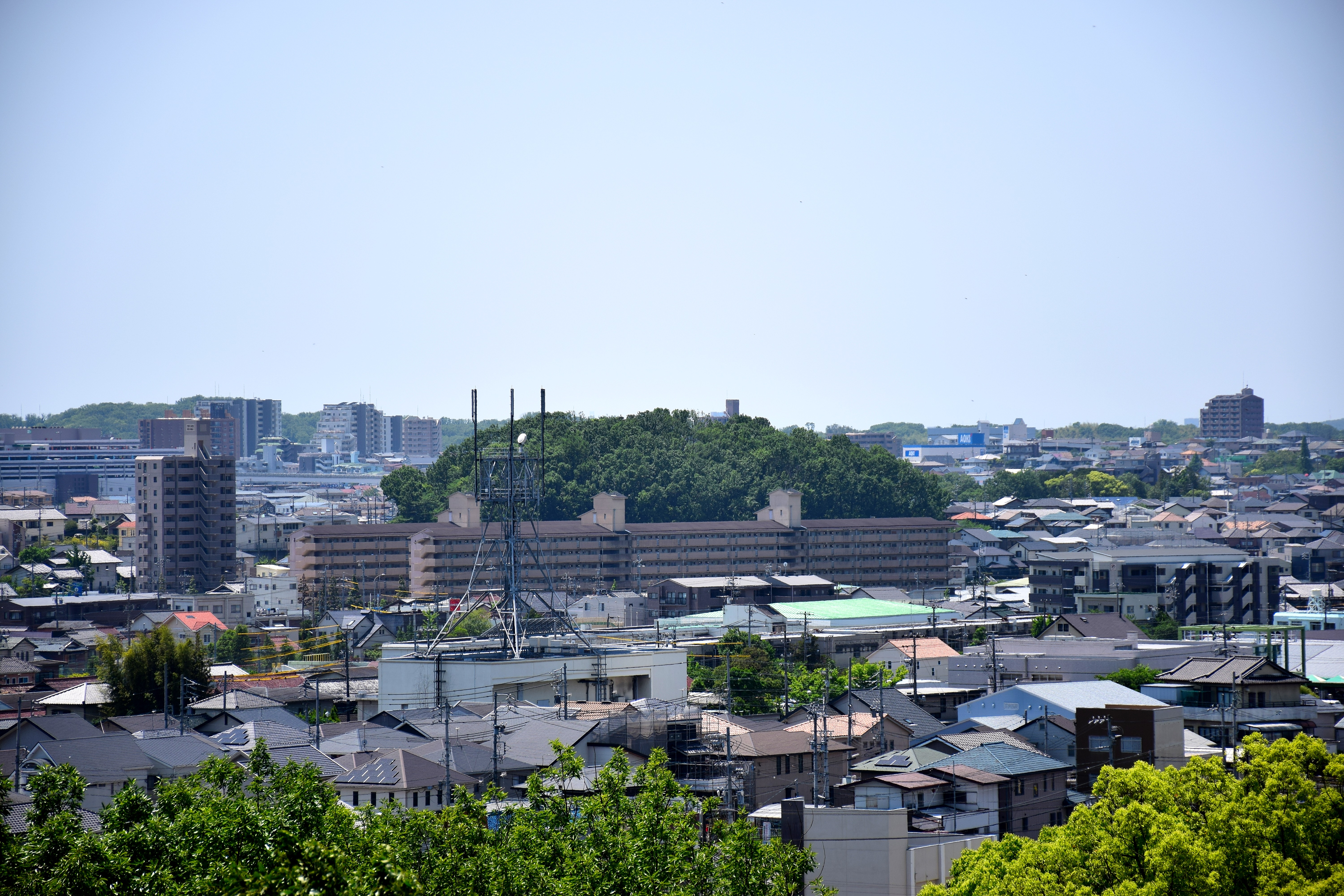
Skyline of Nagakute City

Nagakute is located in the Owari Hills of central Aichi Prefecture, at an elevation of 43 to 184 meters, and is bordered by the metropolis of Nagoya to the west. Thirteen rivers flow through the city.

=== Climate ===
The city has a climate characterized by hot and humid summers, and relatively mild winters (Köppen climate classification Cfa). The average annual temperature in Nagakute is 15.5 °C. The average annual rainfall is 1641 mm with September as the wettest month. The temperatures are highest on average in August, at around 27.9 °C, and lowest in January, at around 4.0 °C.

=== Demographics ===
Per Japanese census data, the population of Nagakute has increased dramatically over the past 50 years. The median age of a population in 2020 was 40.2 years old, the youngest in Japan.

Historical population
Year	Pop.	±%
1940	5,138	—
1950	6,638	+29.2%
1960	6,639	+0.0%
1970	11,317	+70.5%
1980	18,610	+64.4%
1990	33,714	+81.2%
2000	43,306	+28.5%
2010	52,399	+21.0%
2020	60,162	+14.8%

=== Neighboring municipalities ===
Aichi Prefecture

- Nagoya (Moriyama-ku, Meitō-ku)
- Nisshin
- Owariasahi
- Seto
- Toyota

== History ==
=== Feudal period ===
During the Sengoku period, the Battle of Komaki and Nagakute was held in this vicinity.

=== Early modern period ===
During the Edo period area of modern Nagakute was part of the holdings of Owari Domain.

=== Late modern period ===
Nagakute Village was established within Aichi District on May 10, 1906, through the merger of the hamlets of Nagakute (different spelling as 長湫村), Kamigō and Yazako.

=== Contemporary history ===
Nagakute was elevated to town status on April 1, 1971.

Expo 2005 was a major boost to the local economy, and led to the construction of the Linimo, a commercial linear motor train, to connect the area with the Nagoya metropolis.

The Nagakute hostage incident occurred within the town limits in May 2007.

Nagakute was elevated to city status on January 4, 2012.

== Government ==
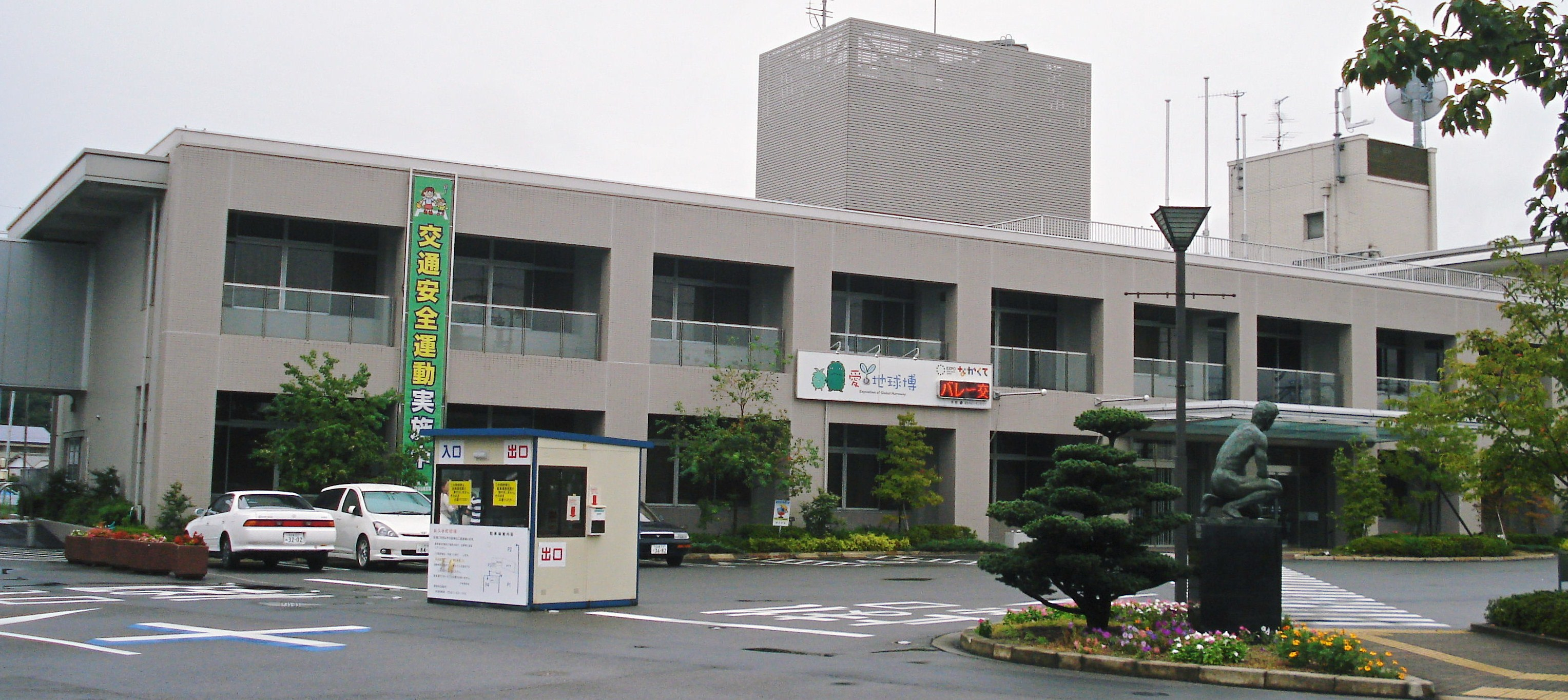
Nagakute city hall

Nagakute has a mayor-council form of government with a directly elected mayor and a unicameral city legislature of 18 members. The city contributes one member to the Aichi Prefectural Assembly. In terms of national politics, the city is part of Aichi District 7 of the lower house of the Diet of Japan.

== Sister cities ==
=== International ===
Sister cities

- Waterloo, Belgium, since October 8, 1992

==== National ====
Friendship city

- Nagiso, Nagano Prefecture, since October 21, 2006
- Takarazuka, Hyōgo Prefecture, since October 27, 2012

== Economy ==
=== Secondary sector of the economy ===
==== Manufacturing ====
Due to its location, Nagakute's economy is centered around the automobile industry. Toyota Central R&D Labs., Inc. is located in the city, as is electrical systems manufacturer Nitto Kogyo. Nagakute is also the head office of the Aichi Rapid Transit Co., Ltd., better known as the operator of the Linimo Maglev High Speed Surface Transport.

== Education ==
=== University ===
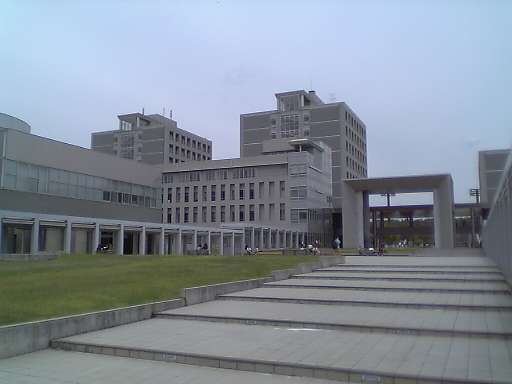
Aichi Prefectural University campus

- Aichi Medical University
- Aichi Prefectural University
- Aichi Prefectural University of Fine Arts and Music
- Aichi Shukutoku University

=== Primary education ===
- Nagakute has six public elementary schools and three public junior high schools operated by the city government, and one public high school operated by the Aichi Prefectural Board of Education. There is also one private high school.

=== International Schools ===
- International Christian Academy of Nagoya (closed)

== Transportation ==
Linimo

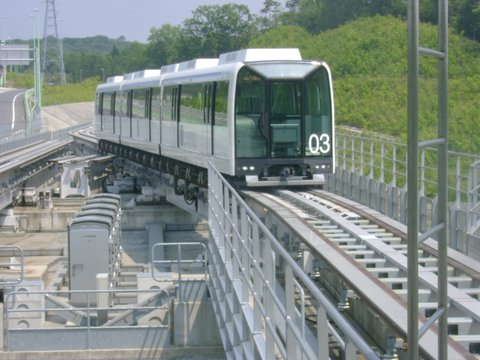
Linimo

=== Railways ===
==== Conventional lines ====
Linimo

- Tōbu Kyūryō Line: - Hanamizuki-dōri – Irigaike-kōen – Nagakute Kosenjō – Geidai-dōri – Kōen-nishi – Aichikyūhaku-kinen-kōen -

=== Buses ===
- The Meitetsu Bus, which serves Nagakute and the surrounding municipalities, operates the Nagoya depot within the city limits.
- Nagakute is also served by the N-Bus, which is a community bus owned by the city of Nagakute and operated by Meitetsu Bus.
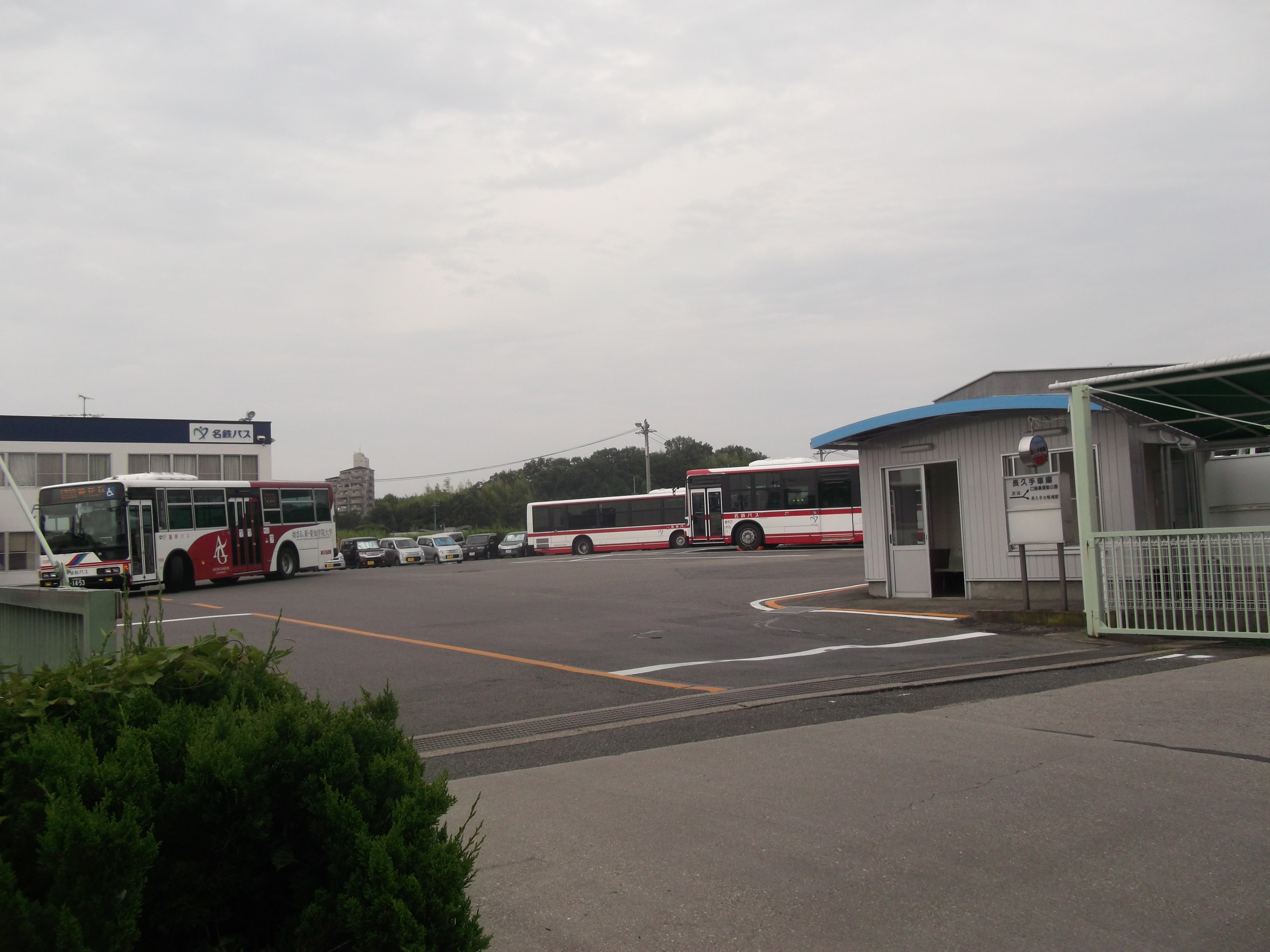
Meitetsu Bus Nagoya Depot

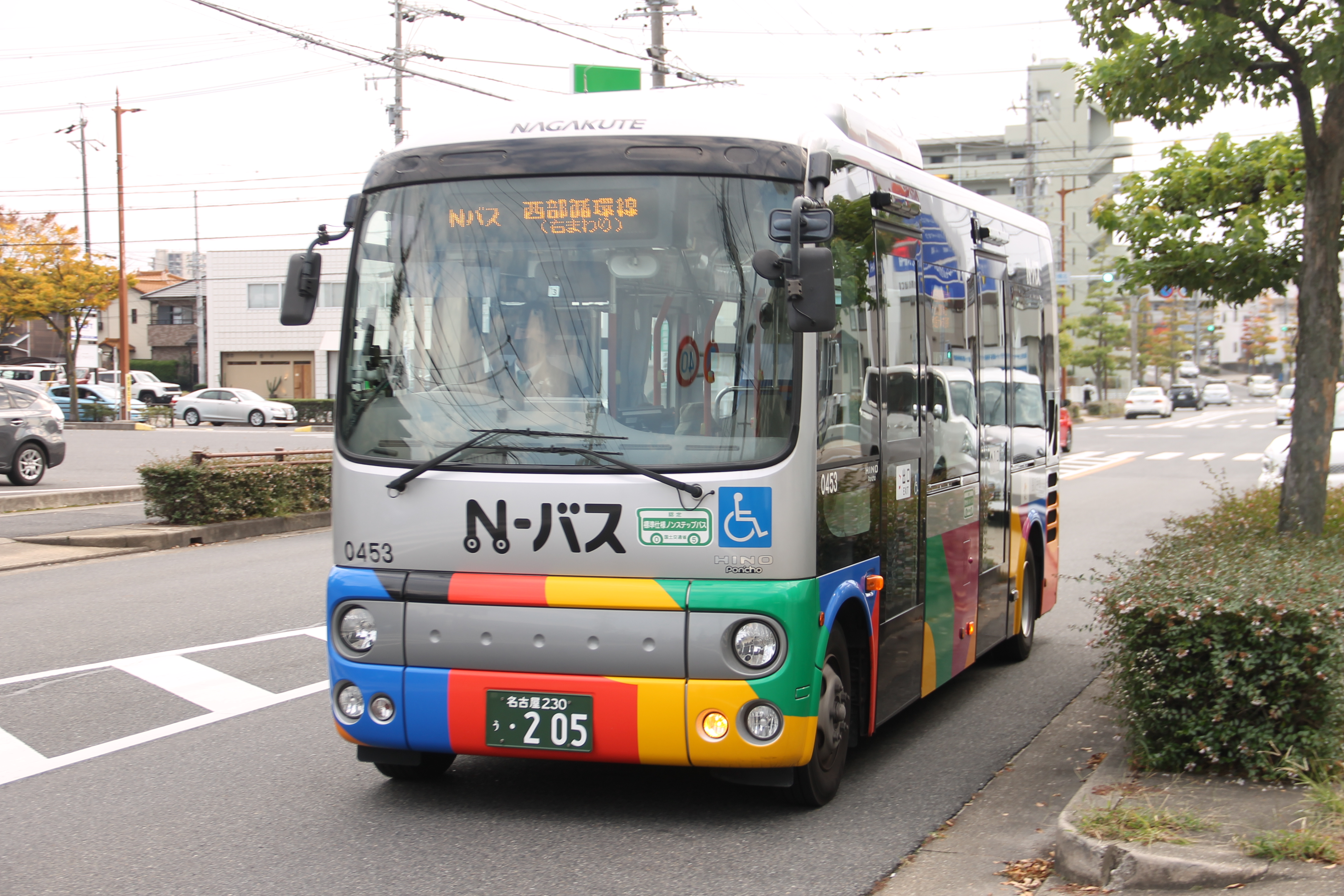
N-Bus

=== Roads ===
==== Expressways ====
- The Nagoya Seto Expressway, which is designated as a Regional High-Standard Highway, starts from Nagakute and funnels traffic in to the Tōmei Expressway, which passes through Nagakute has no interchange within city limits. However, the Nagoya Interchange, which serves the Tomei and Mei-Nikan Expressways, is close to city limits.

== Local attractions ==
- Expo 2005 Site
- Ghibli Park
- Meito Art Museum
- Site of the Battle of Komaki and Nagakute
- Toyota Automobile Museum
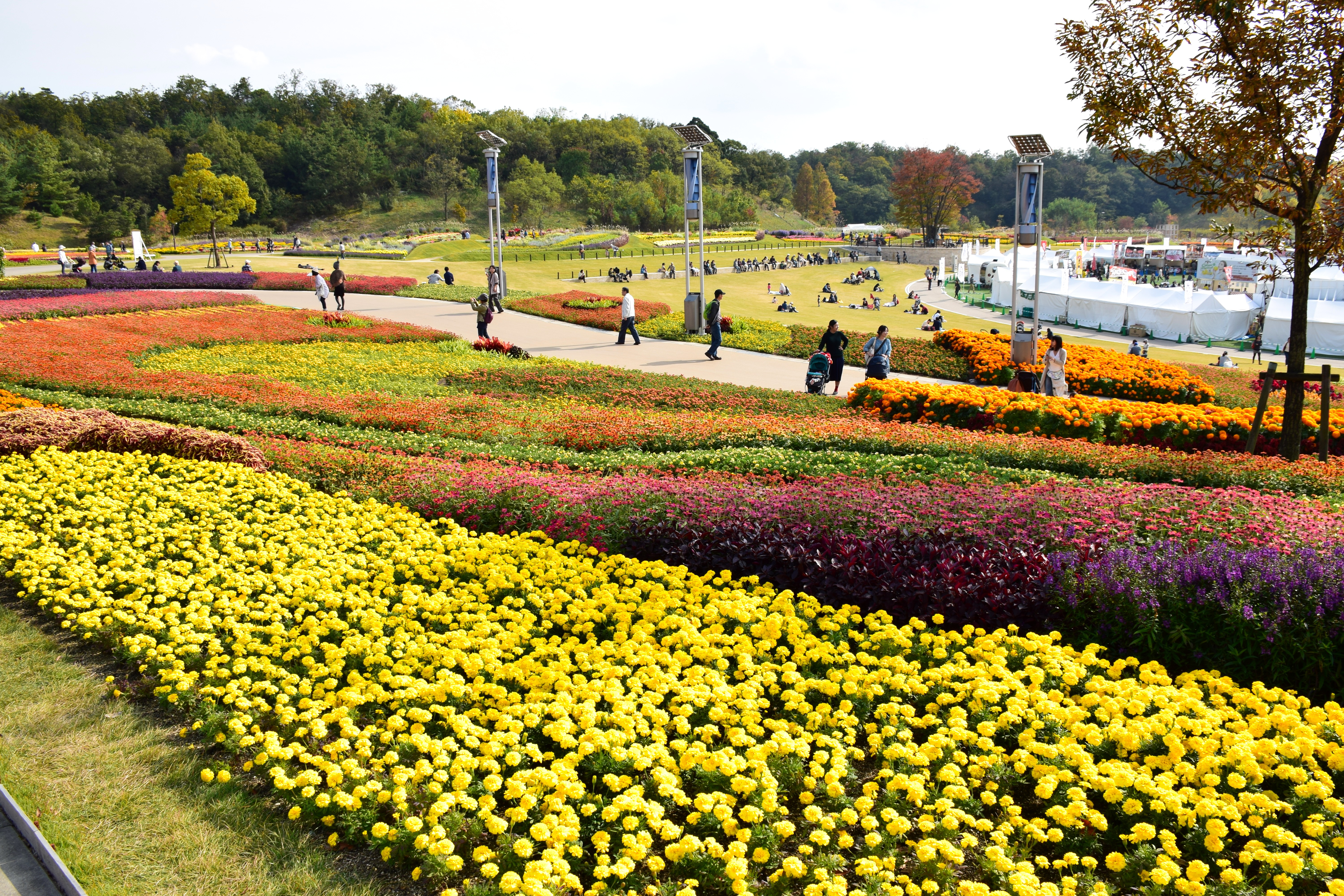
Site of Expo 2005

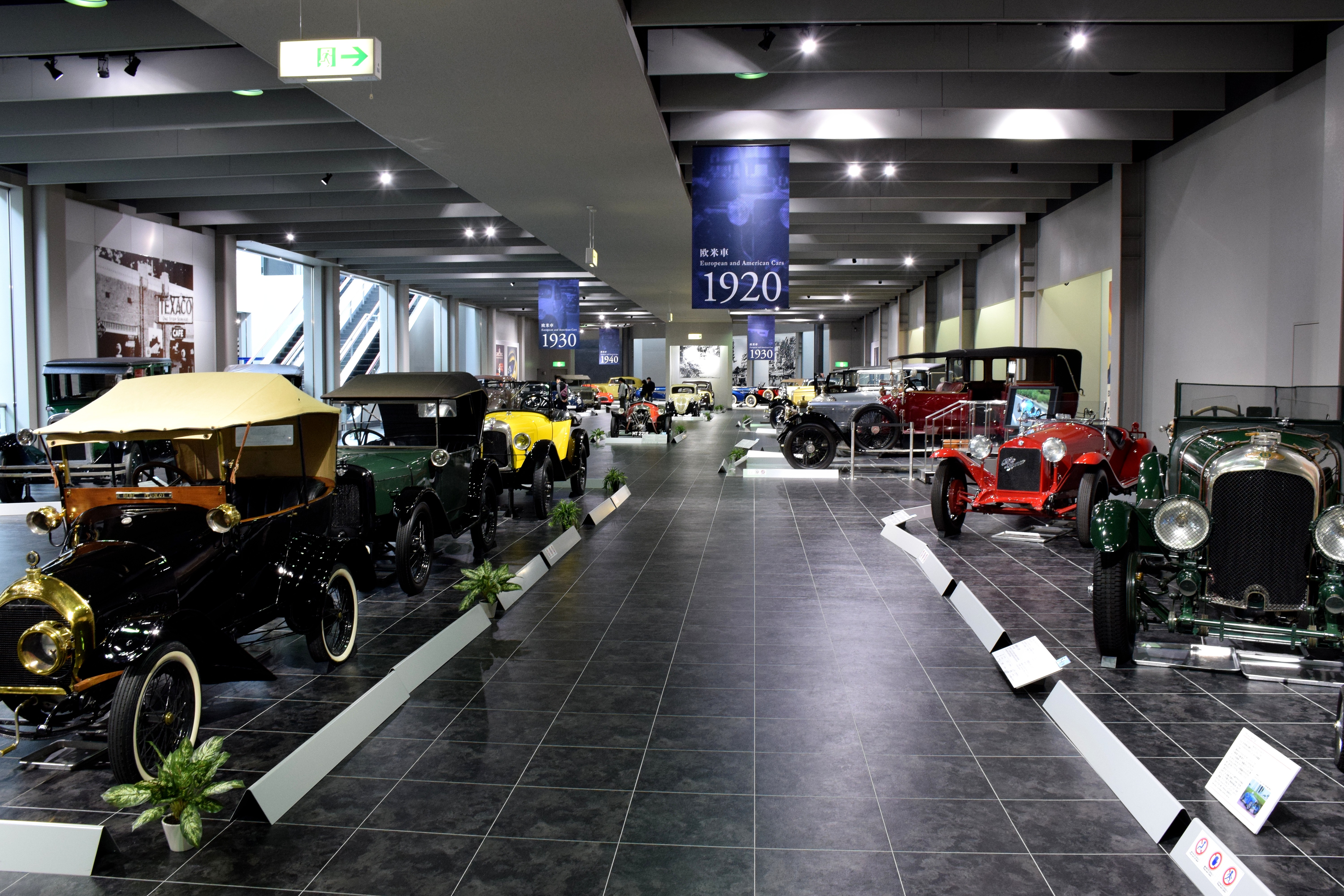
Toyota Automobile Museum

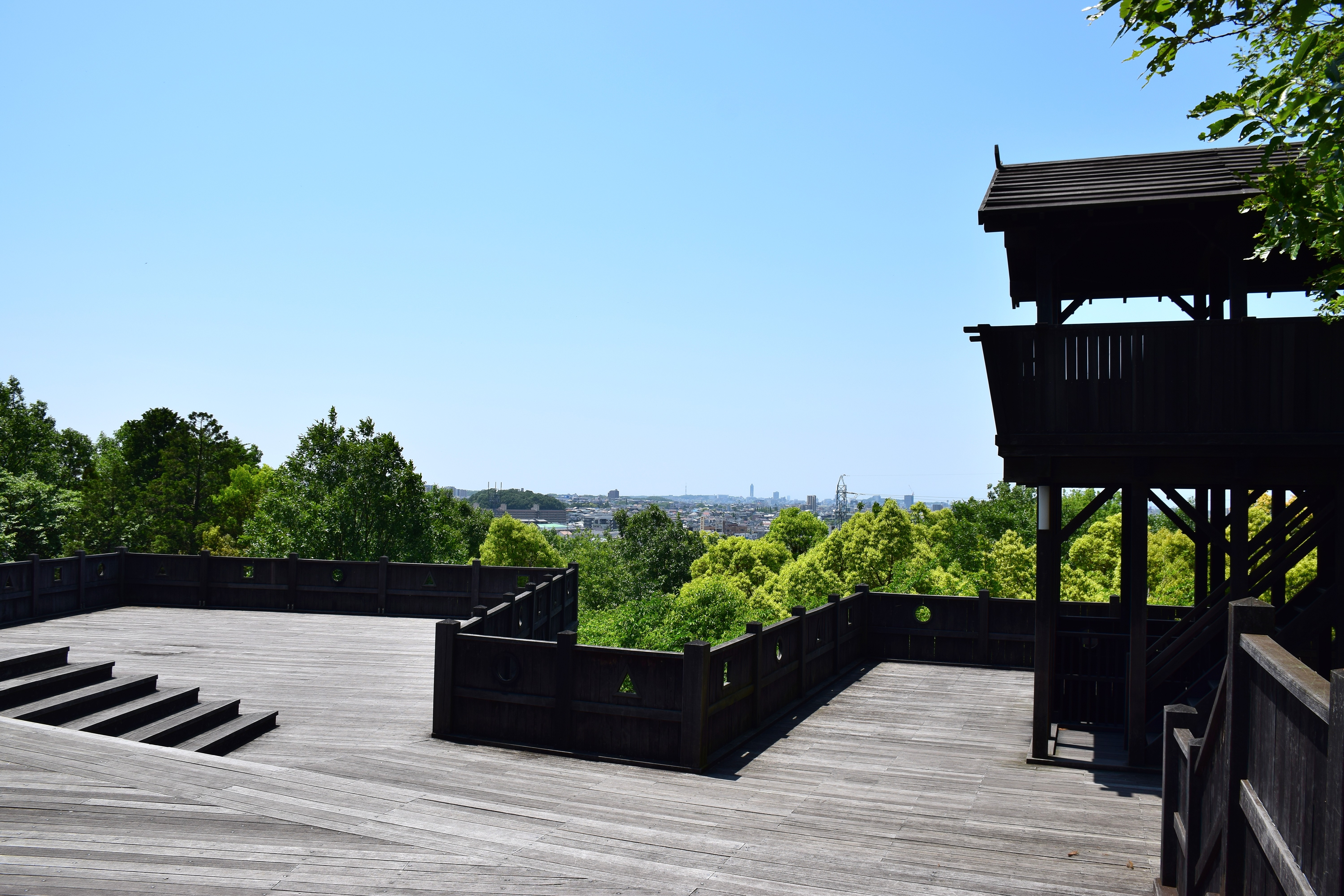
Iroganeyama Historical park

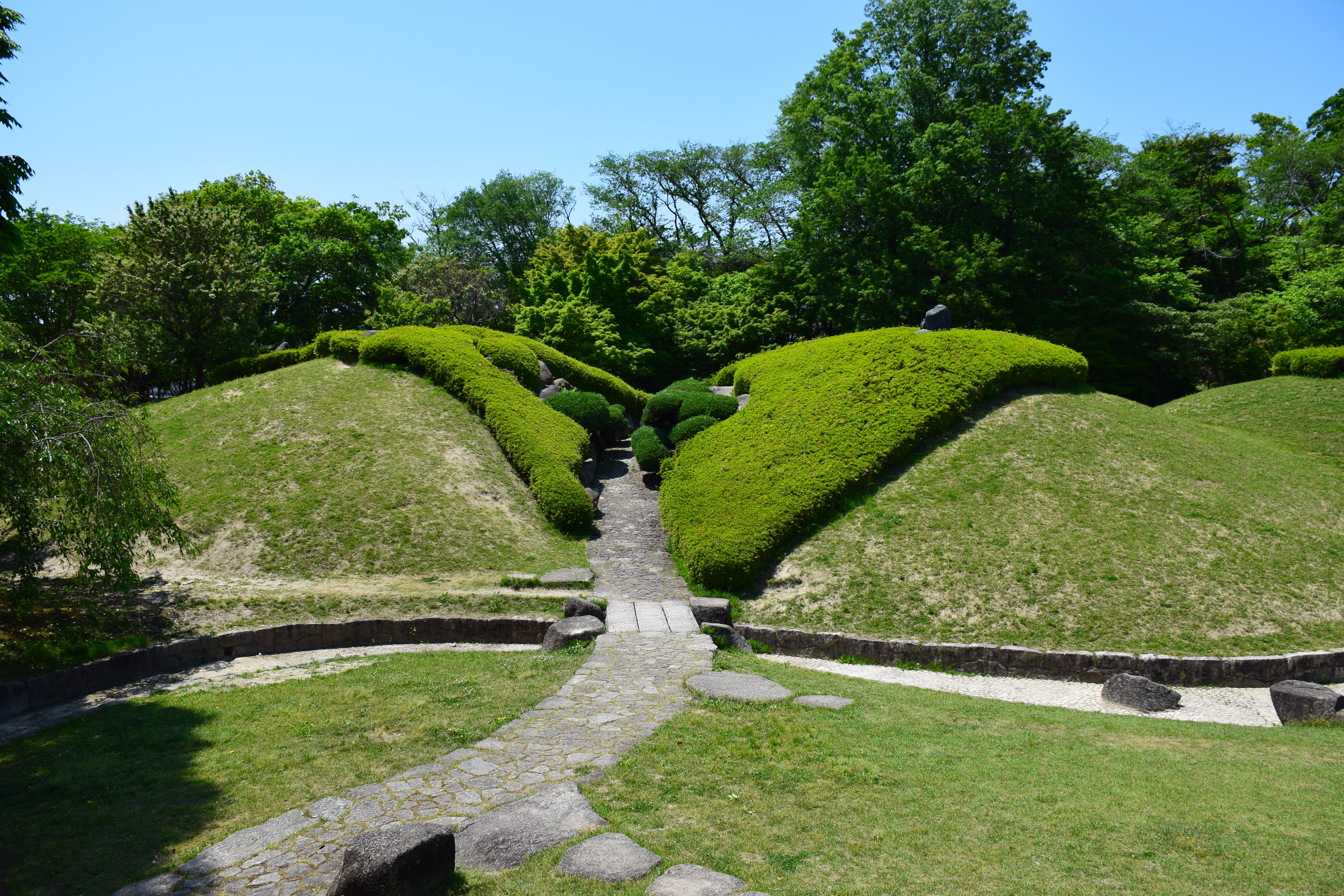
Nagakute Historic Battleground Park

== Notable people from Nagakute ==
- Shinta Fukushima, professional soccer player
- Mine Kawakami, pianist
