= Hanamizuki-dōri Station =

Maglev station in Nagakute, Aichi Prefecture, Japan

Hanamizuki-dōri Station はなみずき通駅

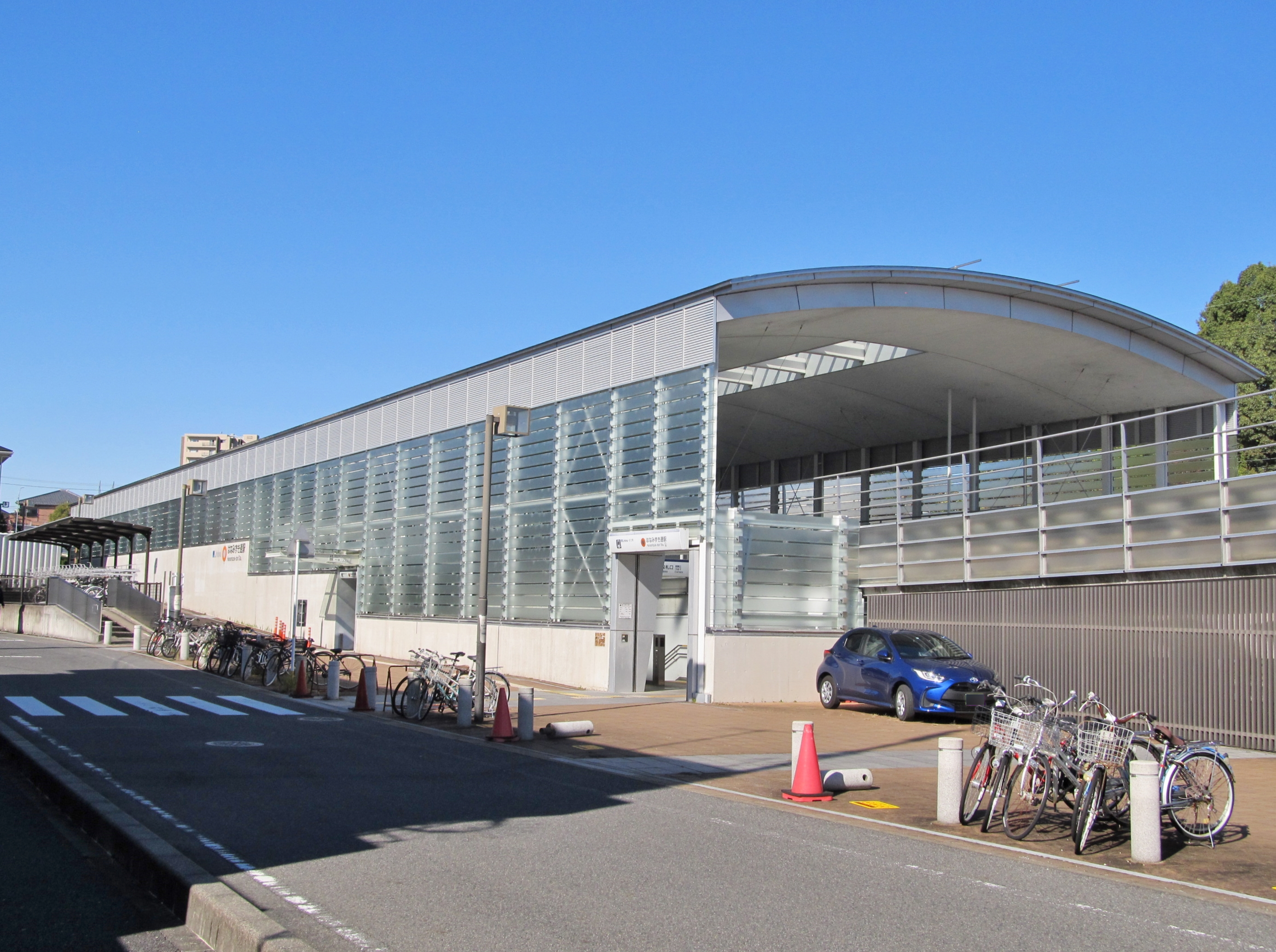
- Hanamizuki-dōri Station

General information
- Location: Kuboyama, Nagakute-shi, Aichi-ken; Japan
- Coordinates: 35.1776°N 137.0352°E
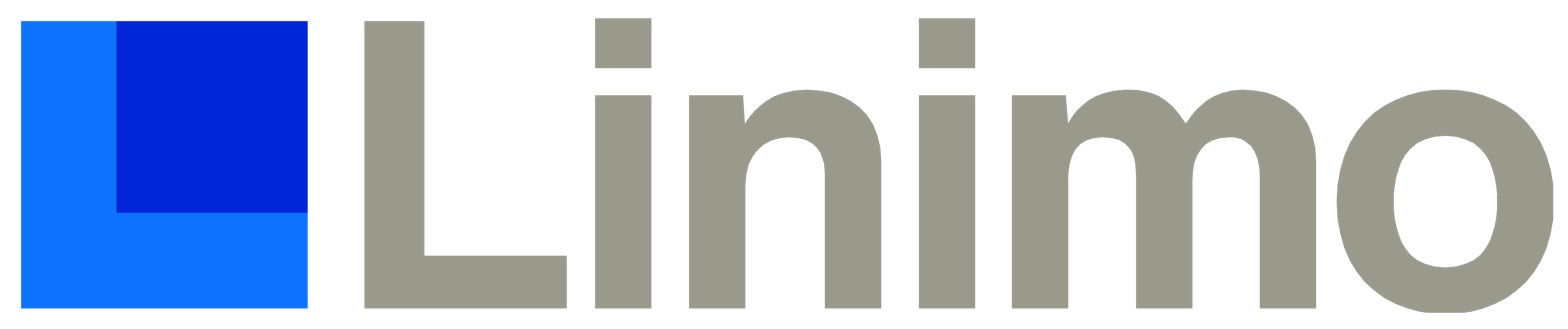
- System: Aichi Rapid Transit station
- Line: ■ Linimo
- Distance: 1.4 kilometers from Fujigaoka
- Platforms: 2 side platforms

Other information
- Status: Staffed
- Station code: L02
- Website: Official website

History
- Opened: March 6, 2005

Passengers
- FY2017: 2,948
Location
- Location within Aichi Prefecture Location within Japan

Hanamizuki-dōri Station (はなみずき通駅, Hanamizuki-dōri-eki) is a railway station in city of Nagakute, Aichi Prefecture, Japan operated by the Aichi Rapid Transit Company.

== Lines ==
Hanamizuki-dōri Station is served by urban maglev Linimo line, and is located 1.4 kilometers from the starting point of the line at Fujigaoka.

== Layout ==
The station has two elevated opposed side platforms with the station building underneath. The station building has automated ticket machines, Manaca automated turnstiles and is staffed. The station is equipped with platform screen doors.

=== Platforms ===
1	■ Linimo	For Yakusa
2	■ Linimo	For Fujigaoka

== Adjacent stations ==
«	Service	»
Linimo
Fujigaoka	-	Irigaike-kōen

== Station history ==
The station was opened on March 6, 2005; 21 years ago.

== Passenger statistics ==
In fiscal 2017, the station was used by 2,948 passengers daily.

== Surrounding area ==
- Nagakute Culture Center
- Nagakute Central Library

== See also ==
- List of railway stations in Japan
