= Tōji-shiryōkan-minami Station =

Maglev station in Toyota, Aichi Prefecture, Japan

Tōji-shiryōkan-minami Station 陶磁資料館南駅

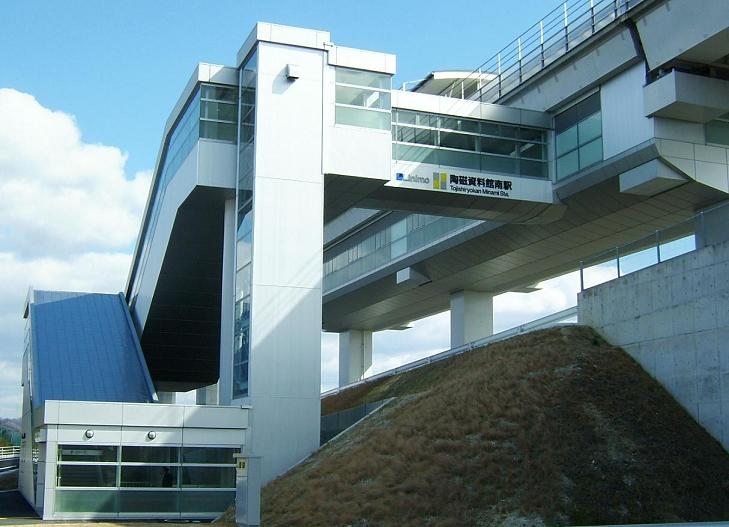
- Tōji-shiryōkan-minami Station

General information
- Location: Yakusacho, Toyota-shi, Aichi-ken 470-0356; Japan
- Coordinates: 35.1792°N 137.0969°E
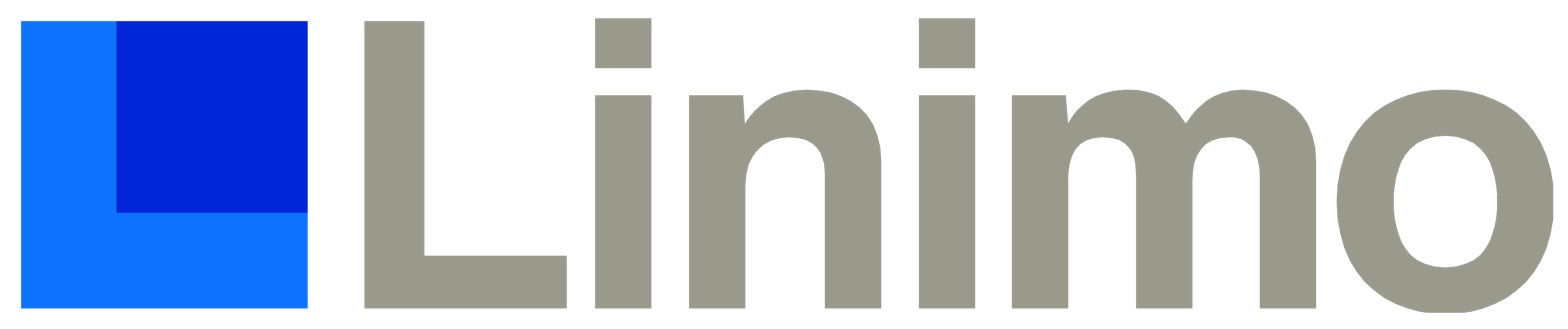
- System: Aichi Rapid Transit station
- Line: ■ Linimo
- Distance: 8.0 kilometers from Fujigaoka
- Platforms: 1 island platform

Other information
- Status: Staffed
- Station code: L08
- Website: Official website

History
- Opened: March 6, 2005

Passengers
- FY2017: 426
Location
- Location within Aichi Prefecture Location within Japan

Tōji-shiryōkan-minami Station (陶磁資料館南駅, Tōji-shiryōkan-minami-eki) is a railway station in city of Toyota, Aichi Prefecture, Japan operated by the Aichi Rapid Transit Company.

== Lines ==
Tōji-shiryōkan-minami Station is served by urban maglev Linimo line, and is located 8.0 kilometers from the starting point of the line at Fujigaoka.

== Layout ==
The station has one elevated island platform with the station building underneath. The station building has automated ticket machines, Manaca automated turnstiles and is staffed.

=== Platforms ===
1	■ Linimo	For Yakusa
2	■ Linimo	For Aichikyūhaku-kinen-kōen and Fujigaoka

== Adjacent stations ==
«	Service	»
Linimo
Aichikyūhaku-kinen-kōen	-	Yakusa

== Station history ==
Tōji-shiryōkan-minami Station was opened on March 6, 2005; 21 years ago. The station provides access to Aichi Prefectural Ceramic Museum.

== Passenger statistics ==
In fiscal 2017, the station was used by 426 passengers daily.

== Surrounding area ==
- Linimo head office

== See also ==
- List of railway stations in Japan
