= Aichikyūhaku-kinen-kōen Station =

Maglev station in Nagakute, Aichi Prefecture, Japan

Ai･Chikyuhaku Kinen Koen Station 愛・地球博記念公園駅

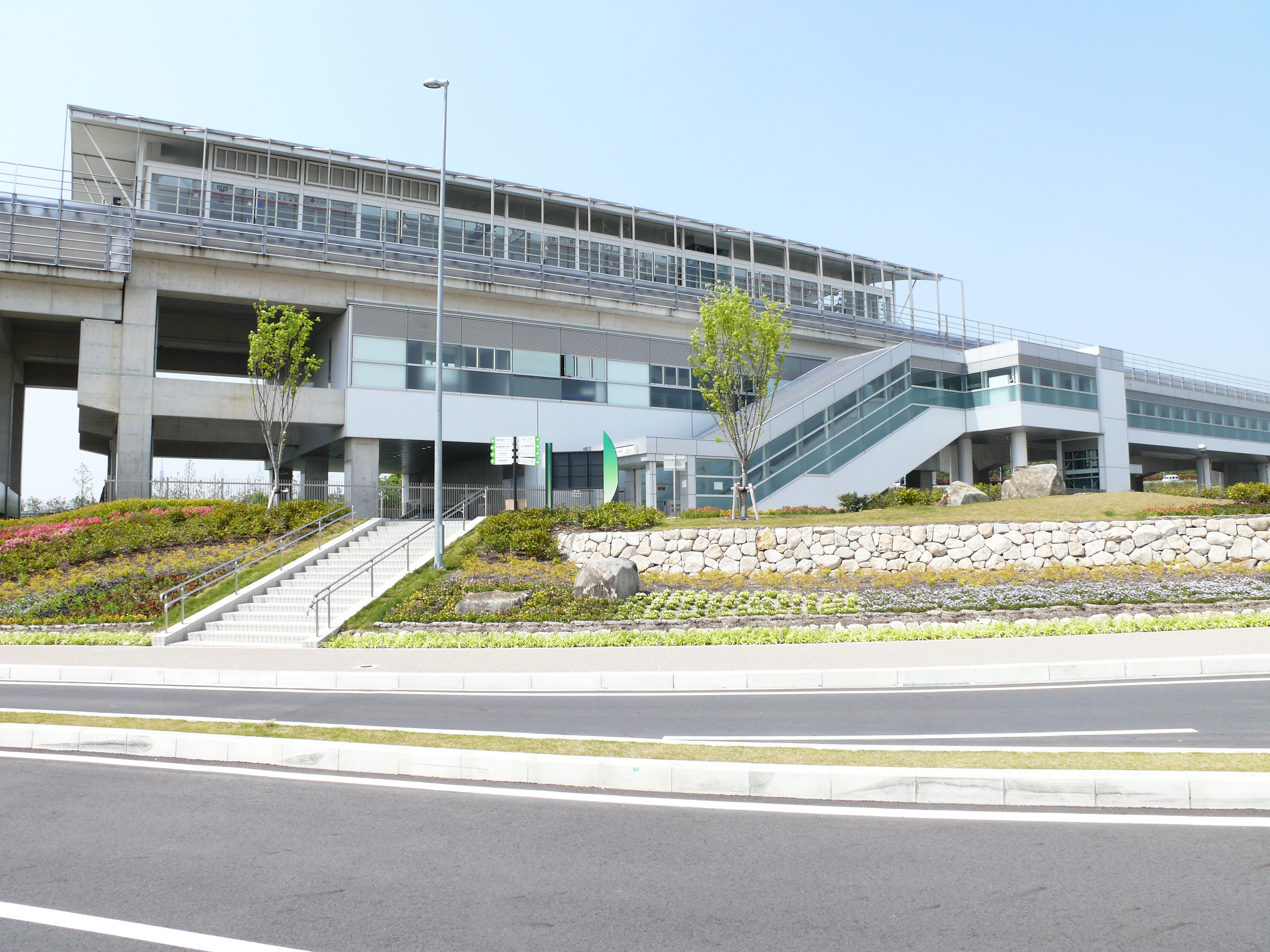
- Aichikyūhaku-kinen-kōen Station

General information
- Location: Ibaragabasama, Nagakute-shi, Aichi-ken; Japan
- Coordinates: 35.177742°N 137.087268°E
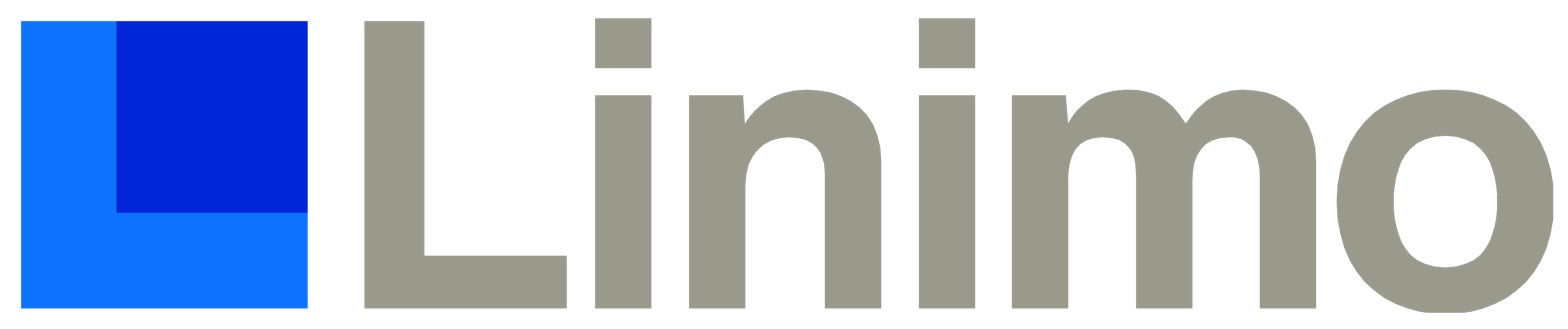
- System: Aichi Rapid Transit station
- Line: ■ Linimo
- Distance: 7.0 kilometers from Fujigaoka
- Platforms: 2 island platforms

Other information
- Status: Staffed
- Station code: L07
- Website: Official website

History
- Opened: March 6, 2005
- Former names: Bampaku Kaijō (until April 1, 2006)

Passengers
- FY2017: 4,912
Location
- Location within Aichi Prefecture Location within Japan

Aichikyūhaku-kinen-kōen Station (愛・地球博記念公園駅, Aichikyūhaku-kinen-kōen-eki), is a railway station in city of Nagakute, Aichi Prefecture, Japan operated by the Aichi Rapid Transit Company.

Officially romanized as Ai · Chikyuhaku Kinen Koen Station, the station serves Expo 2005 Aichi Commemorative Park (Moricoro Park) and Ghibli Park.

== Lines ==
Aichikyūhaku-kinen-kōen Station is served by urban maglev Linimo line, and is located 7.0 kilometers from the starting point of the line at Fujigaoka.

== Layout ==
The station has two elevated island platform with the station building underneath. The station building has automated ticket machines, Manaca automated turnstiles, and is staffed.

=== Platforms ===
1-2	■ Linimo	For Yakusa
3-4	■ Linimo	For Fujigaoka

== Adjacent stations ==
«	Service	»
Linimo
Kōen-nishi	-	Tōji-shiryōkan-minami

== Station history ==
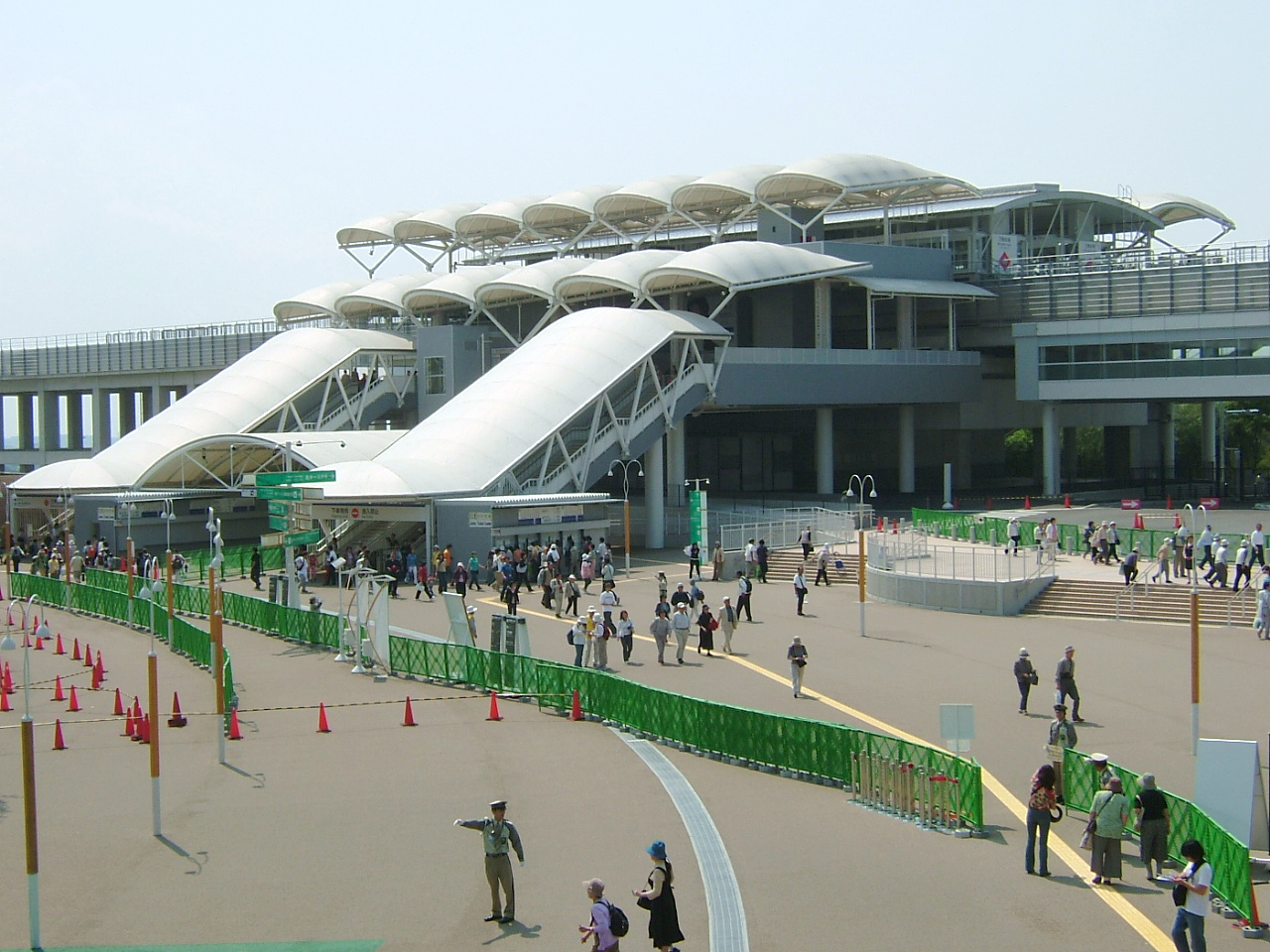
Bampaku Kaijō Station (Now Aichikyūhaku-kinen-kōen Station) serving Expo 2005

Aichikyūhaku-kinen-kōen Station was opened on 6 March 2005; 21 years ago. During Expo 2005, the World Expo that was held in Aichi on that year, this station provided main access to the venue. At that time, it was named for the expo venue, but in the following year it was renamed to its current name.

== Passenger statistics ==
In fiscal 2017, the station was used by 4,912 passengers daily.

== Surrounding area ==
- Expo 2005 Aichi Commemorative Park
- Aichi Prefectural University
- Ghibli Park

== See also ==
- List of railway stations in Japan
