= High Speed Surface Transport =

Japanese train system

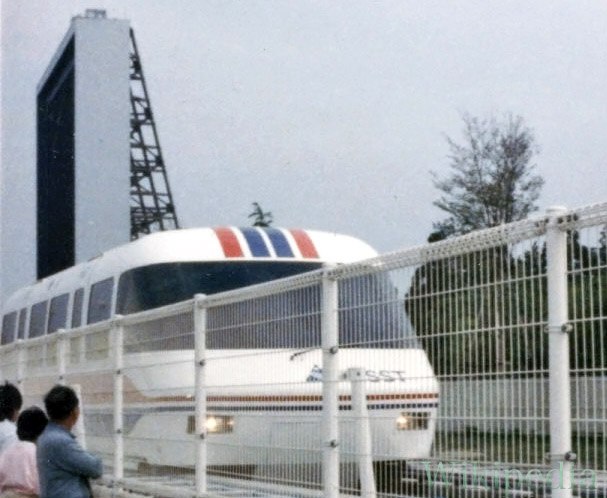
An HSST train at the Expo '85 Exhibition, Tsukuba, Ibaraki, 1985

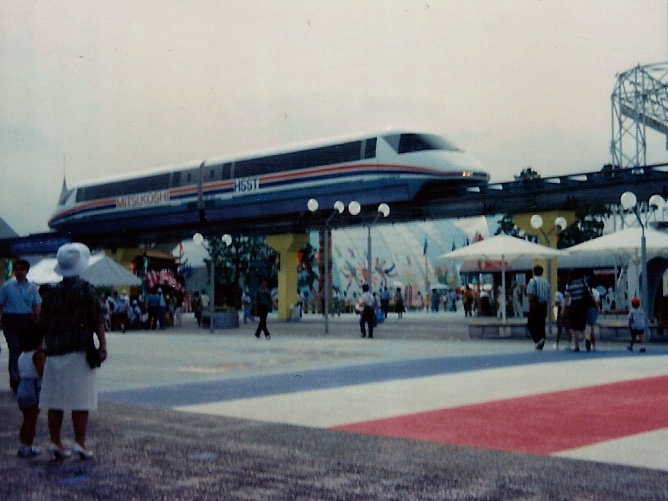
An HSST train at the YES'89 Exhibition, Yokohama, 1989

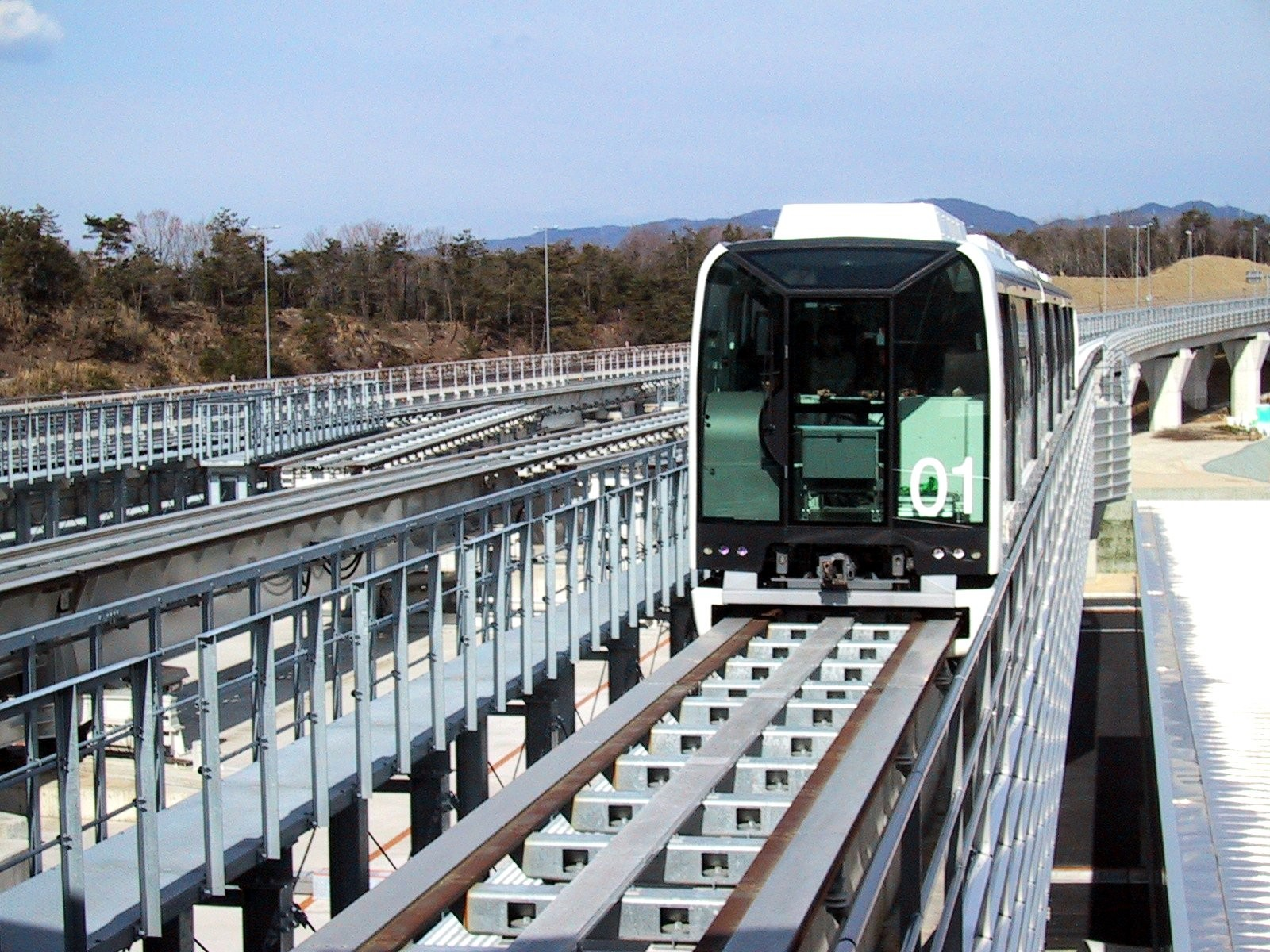
A Linimo HSST-100L train

High Speed Surface Transport (HSST) is a Japanese maglev train system which uses electromagnetic levitation technology. The Linimo line in Aichi Prefecture, Japan uses a descendant of HSST technology.

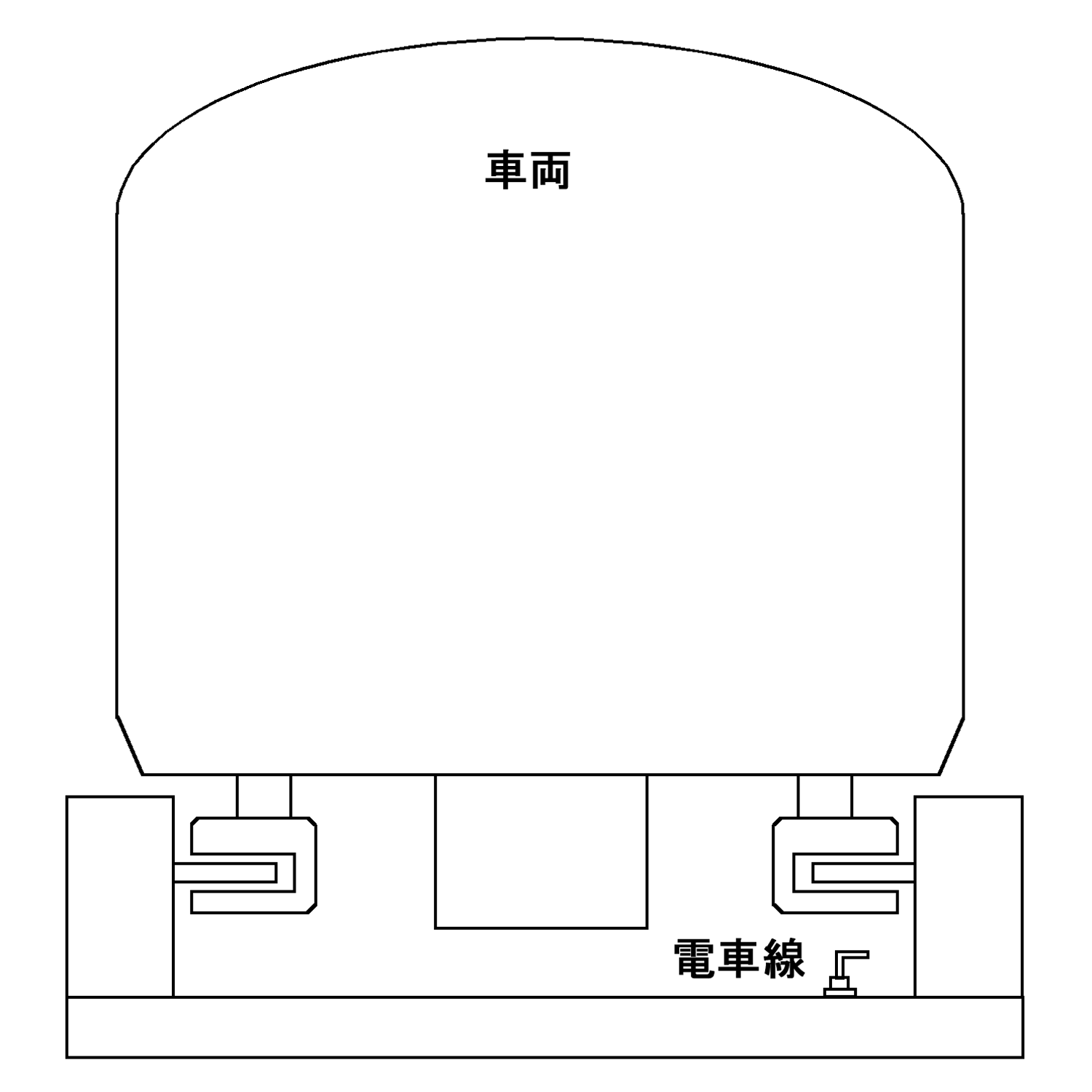

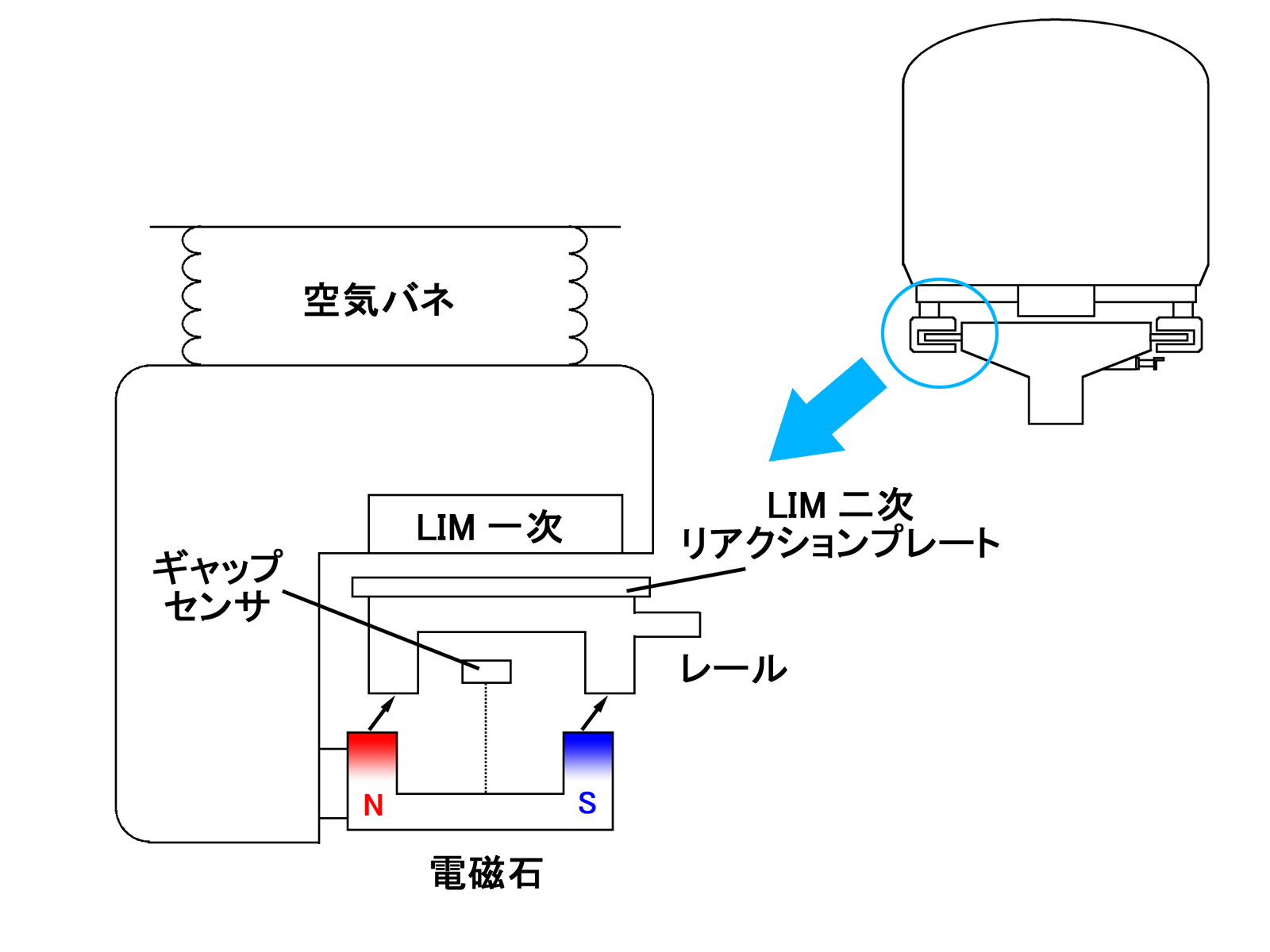

== See also ==
- SCMaglev
- Transrapid
- Krauss-Maffei Transurban - Electromagnetic suspension technology had been transferred from Krauss-Maffei.
- ROMAG

== Bibliography ==
- "Expo '85 At Tsukuba". Popular Mechanics: 102–105. May 1985.
