= Linimo =

Maglev automated people mover in Nagoya, Japan

Coordinates: 35.1711°N 136.8820°E

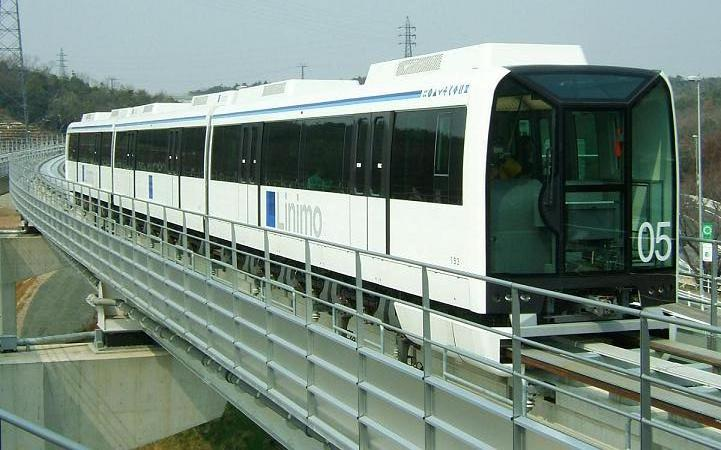

Overview
- Other name: Aichi Rapid Transit Tobu Kyuryo Line
- Native name: リニモ 愛知高速交通東部丘陵線
- Owner: Aichi Rapid Transit Co., Ltd. (Note: Ownership structure: Aichi Prefectural Government 57.19% Nagakute Municipal Government 15.45% Nagoya Municipal Government 14.70% Meitetsu 2.48% Development Bank of Japan 1.44% Nippon Sharyo 0.68% Toshiba Infrastructure Systems & Solutions 0.60% Kyosan Electric Mfg. Co. 0.53% Toyota 0.49%)
- Locale: Aichi Prefecture, Japan
- Termini: Fujigaoka; Yakusa
- Stations: 9
- Website: Official website

Service
- Type: Rapid transit
- Rolling stock: Aichi Rapid Transit 100 series
- Daily ridership: 16,500

History
- Opened: 6 March 2005; 21 years ago

Technical
- Line length: 8.9 km (5.5 mi)
- Number of tracks: 2
- Minimum radius: 75 m (246 ft 1 in)
- Electrification: Conductor rail, 1,500 V DC
- Operating speed: 100 km/h (62 mph)

Linimo (リニモ, Rinimo), formally the Aichi Rapid Transit Tobu Kyuryo Line (愛知高速交通東部丘陵線, Aichi Kōsoku Kōtsū Tōbu Kyūryō-sen), is a magnetic levitation train line in Aichi Prefecture, Japan, running between the cities of Nagoya, Nagakute, and Toyota. While primarily built to serve the Expo 2005 fair site, the line has since operated to serve the local community.

Linimo is owned and operated by third-sector railway company Aichi Rapid Transit Co., Ltd. and is the first commercial maglev in Japan to use the High Speed Surface Transport (HSST) type technology. It is also the world's first uncrewed commercial urban maglev. Linimo was the fourth overall commercial urban maglev operated in the world, predated by the Birmingham Maglev (1984–1995), the Berlin M-Bahn (1989–1991) and the Shanghai Maglev (opened in 2004).

== Specifications ==
The linear motor magnetic-levitated train has a top speed of 100 kilometres per hour (62 mph), floating 8 millimetres (0.31 in) above the track when in motion, and is intended as an alternative to conventional metro systems, not high-speed operation. The line has nine stations and is 8.9 kilometres (5.5 mi) long, with a minimum operating radius of 75 metres (246 ft) and a maximum gradient of 6%. The line uses automatic train control (ATC) and automatic train operation (ATO). Construction of the track cost ¥60 billion (US$575 million) while the Linimo trains themselves, built by Nippon Sharyo, cost ¥40.5 billion (US$380 million). The construction cost came to roughly $65 million per km without rolling stock.

== Rolling stock ==
The trains for the line were designed by the Chubu HSST Development Corporation, which also operated a test track in Nagoya. They were built by Nippon Sharyo, cost ¥40.5 billion (US$380 million). The trains are fixed 3-car train sets (Mc1+M+Mc2). The end cars (Mc Car) are 14.0 metres (45 ft 11 in) long and the middle car (M Car) 13.5 metres (44 ft 3 in), giving a total train set length of 43.3 metres (142 ft 1 in). The cars are 2.6 metres (8 ft 6 in) wide. The Mc car has a capacity of 34 seated and 46 standing, and the M car 36 seated and 48 standing, for a total capacity per train set of 244. The cars have a semi-monocoque construction of welded aluminum, with two emergency doors at each car end and two 1,200-millimetre (47 in) doors per side.

=== 100 Series formations ===
The line operates eight three-car sets which are formed as follows.

Car No.	1	2	3
Designation	Mc1	M	Mc2
Numbering	1x1	1x2	1x3

== Technical and financial difficulties ==
Being the first commercial implementation of a new type of transport system, the line suffered a number of highly publicized technical breakdowns during the Expo, with far higher demand during peak hours than the line's carrying capacity of 4,000 passengers per direction per hour. On March 19, 2005, the train stopped departing when it detected an overload of passengers, but this was immediately corrected when a later inspection revealed that the weight-detecting sensors were oversensitive. The line also has to be shut down for safety reasons when wind speed exceeds 25 m/s (56 mph), a relatively common occurrence in the area.

During the Expo, the line carried an average of 31,000 passengers per day, but ridership dropped to only 12,000 in the first six months after the Expo, and the line lost over ¥3 billion in 2006. While ridership gradually increased to 16,500 passengers per day in 2008, the line still made a financial loss of ¥2.1 billion in fiscal year 2009. In 2016, the line started turning a profit, making a net profit of ¥83.4 million that year.

== History ==
Aichi Rapid Transit gained permission to build the line on October 3, 2001. The line's nickname, "Linimo" was revealed in November 2002. The names of the stations were decided in December 2003, and the entire line opened to the public on March 6, 2005. After the end of the 2005 Expo, both Yakusa Station and Aichikyūhaku-kinen-kōen Station were renamed from their former names, translated as Expo Yakusa Station and Expo Site Station, respectively.

On August 3, 2019, at approximately 11:15am, a five-year-old girl got separated from her mother and was caught in the 35 cm gap between the train doors and the platform screen doors when the train departed. The girl subsequently fell onto the tracks but no injuries were reported.

To prevent a recurrence of the incident, it was announced that new safety measures will be installed including additional cameras and sensors. From August 10, 2019, until the new measures are in place (estimated to be October 2019), a staff member will travel on every train to ensure passenger safety. Staff used the opening window beside the driver's control desk to observe the doors closing and the train departing. Due to the limited number of staff available, the frequency of trains was temporarily reduced to every 10 minutes between 7am and 10am, and every 12 minutes at other times.

== Stations ==
No.	Icon	Name	Japanese	Distance (km)	Transfers	Location	
L01		Fujigaoka	藤が丘	0.0	Higashiyama Line	Meito-ku, Nagoya	Aichi Prefecture
L02		Hanamizuki-dōri	はなみずき通	1.4		Nagakute	Aichi Prefecture
L03		Irigaike-kōen	杁ヶ池公園	2.3		Nagakute	Aichi Prefecture
L04		Nagakute Kosenjō	長久手古戦場	3.4		Nagakute	Aichi Prefecture
L05		Geidai-dōri	芸大通	4.5		Nagakute	Aichi Prefecture
L06		Kōen-nishi	公園西	6.0		Nagakute	Aichi Prefecture
L07		Aichikyūhaku-kinen-kōen ("Expo Memorial Park") (Note: Formerly named Bampaku Kaijo Station ("Expo Site"))	愛・地球博記念公園	7.0		Nagakute	Aichi Prefecture
L08		Toji-shiryokan-minami	陶磁資料館南	8.0		Toyota	Aichi Prefecture
L09		Yakusa (Note: Formerly named Bampaku Yakusa Station)	八草	8.9	Aichi Loop Line (18)	Toyota	Aichi Prefecture

Footnotes

== Cancelled plan in Taiwan ==
In 2006, there was a plan to use the system for the Xinyi LRT, a proposed line in Xinyi, Taipei, Taiwan. The line was cancelled in 2007.

== See also ==
- Expo 2005
- High Speed Surface Transport
