= Yakusa Station =

Railway and maglev station in Toyota, Aichi Prefecture, Japan

Yakusa Station 八草駅

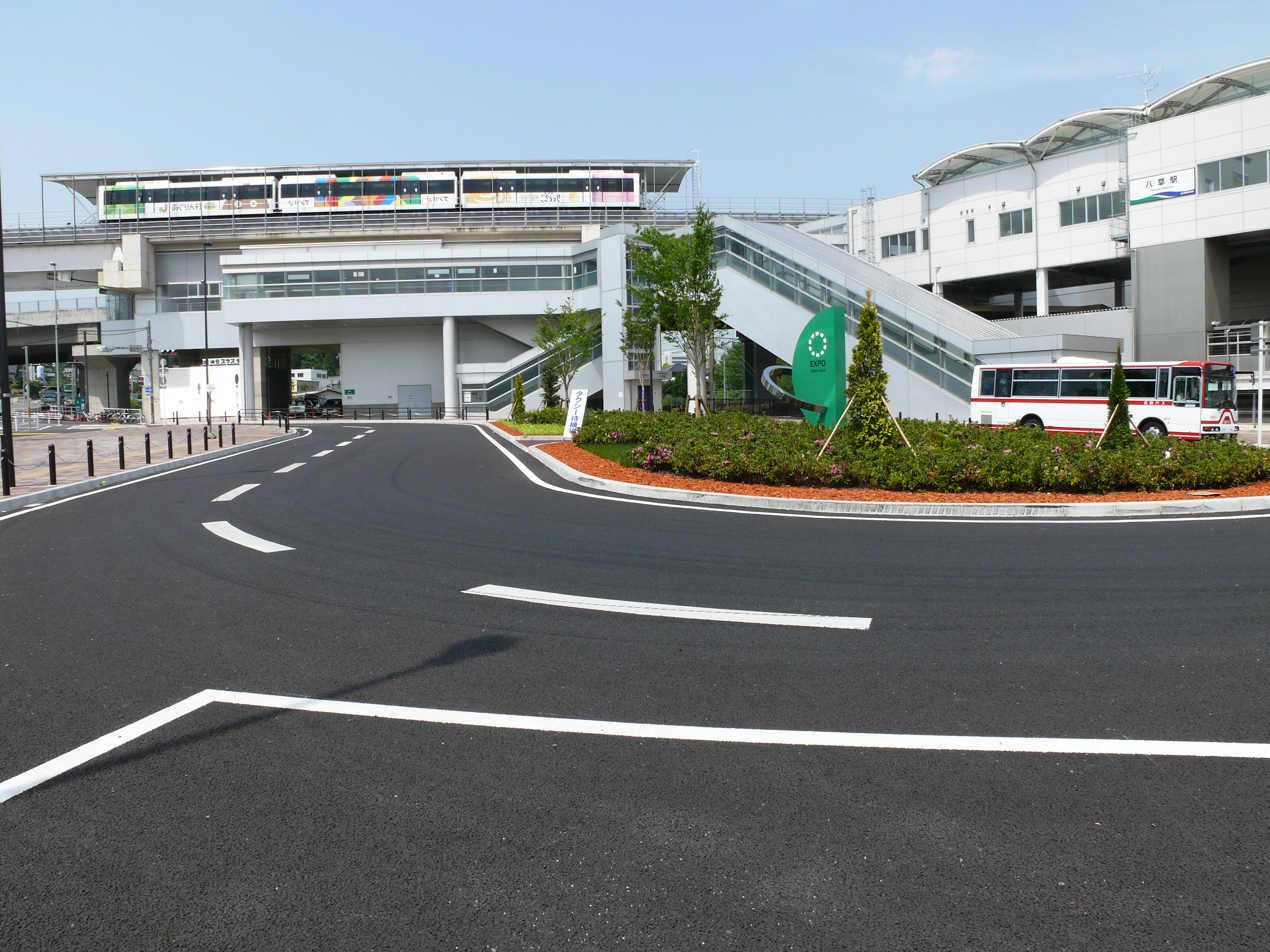
- Yakusa Station in May 2007

General information
- Location: Ishizaka Yakusa-cho, Toyota, Aichi; Japan
- Coordinates: 35.1758°N 137.1068°E
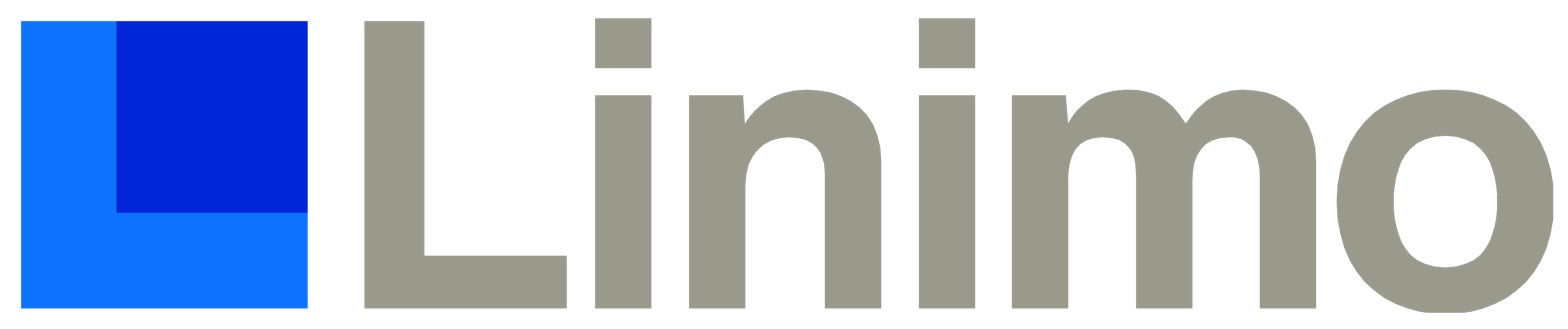
- Operator: Aichi Loop Railway; Aichi Rapid Transit
- Lines: ■ Aichi Loop Line (Aikan); ■ Linimo
- Distance: 32.0 kilometers from Okazaki
- Platforms: 2 side + 1 island platform

Other information
- Status: Staffed
- Station code: 18 (Aikan); L09 (Linimo)
- Website: Official website (Aikan); Official website (Linimo)

History
- Opened: January 31, 1988

Passengers
- FY2017: 6,139 (Aikan); 7,294 (Linimo)
Location
- Location within Aichi Prefecture Location within Japan

Yakusa Station (八草駅, Yakusa-eki) is an interchange railway station in the city of Toyota, Aichi Prefecture, Japan, operated by the third sector Aichi Loop Railway Company, with the Aichi Rapid Transit Company as a tenant.

== Lines ==
Yakusa Station is served by the Aichi Loop Line, and is located 32.0 kilometers from the starting point of the line at Okazaki. It is also a terminal station for the urban maglev Linimo line, and is located 8.9 kilometers from the opposing terminal at Fujigaoka.

== Station layout ==
The Aichi Loop Railway station has two elevated opposed side platforms, with the station building located underneath. The station building has automated ticket machines, TOICA automated turnstiles and is staffed. The Linimo station has one elevated island platform, also with the station underneath.

=== Platforms ===
1	■ Aichi Loop Line	For Shin-Toyota, Kitano-Masuzuka, and Okazaki
2	■ Aichi Loop Line	For Setoshi and Kōzōji

1	■ Linimo	Alight only
2	■ Linimo	For Aichikyūhaku-kinen-kōen and Fujigaoka

== Adjacent stations ==
«	Service	»
Aichi Loop Line
Sasabara	-	Yamaguchi
Linimo
Toji-shiryokan-minami	-	Terminus

== Station history ==
Yakusa Station was opened on January 31, 1988 together with the establishment of the Aichi Loop Railway Company.

== Passenger statistics ==
In fiscal 2017, the Aichi Loop portion of the station was used by an average of 6,139 passengers daily and the Linimo Portion of the station was used by 7,294 passengers daily.

== Surrounding area ==
- Aichi Institute of Technology

== See also ==
- List of railway stations in Japan
