= Fujigaoka Station (Nagoya) =

Metro and maglev station in Nagoya, Japan

Coordinates: 35.1822°N 137.022°E

H22 Fujigaoka Station 藤が丘駅
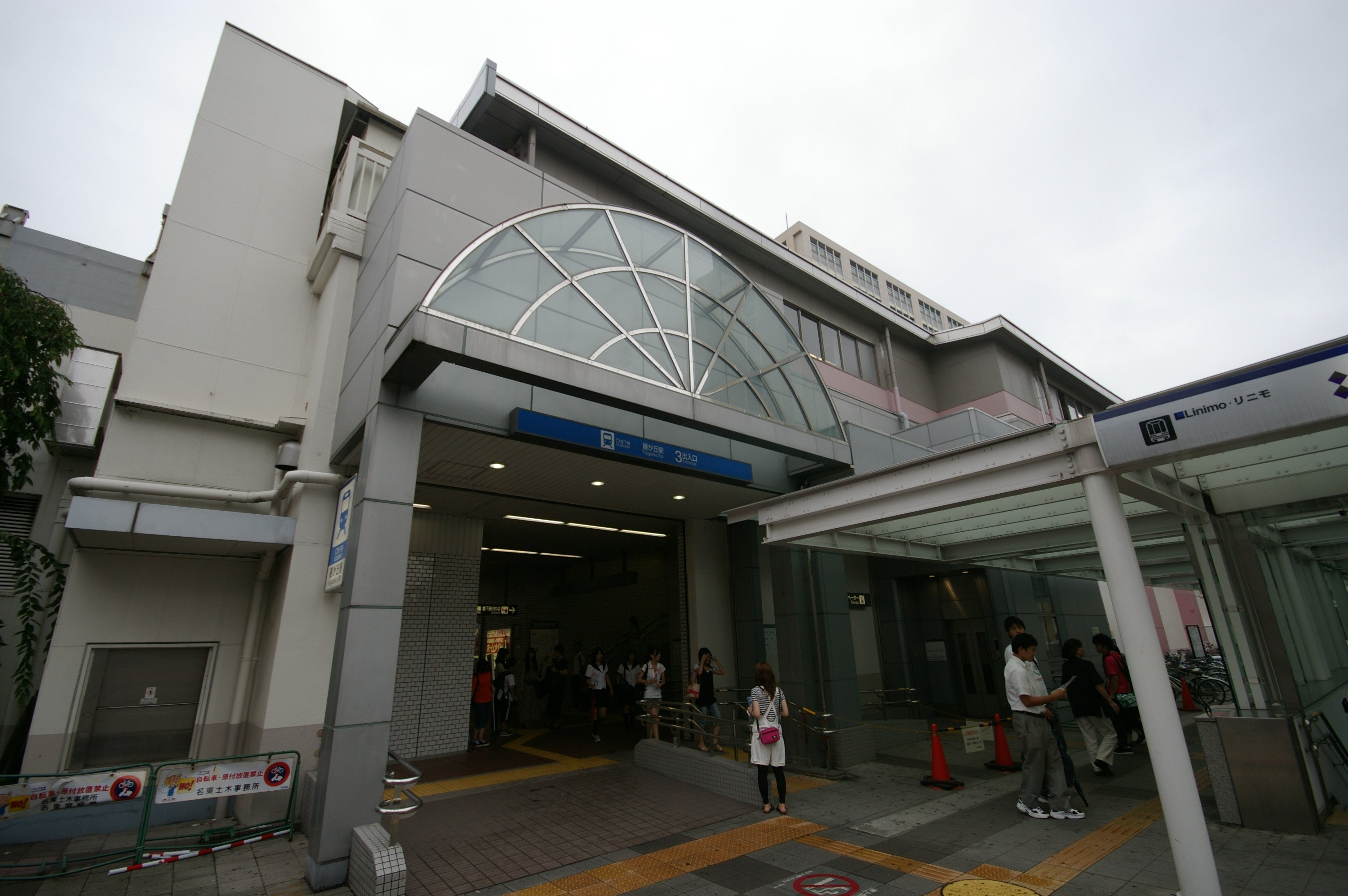

General information
- Location: Fujigaoka 163, Meitō, Nagoya, Aichi （名古屋市名東区藤が丘163） Japan
- System: Nagoya Municipal Subway station
- Operator: Transportation Bureau City of Nagoya
- Line: Higashiyama Line
- Connections: Bus terminal

Other information
- Station code: H22

History
- Opened: 1969; 57 years ago

Passengers
- 2007: 27,682 daily

Services
Preceding station	Nagoya Municipal Subway	Following station
Hongō H21 towards Takabata	Higashiyama Line	Terminus
Location

Fujigaoka Station 藤が丘駅

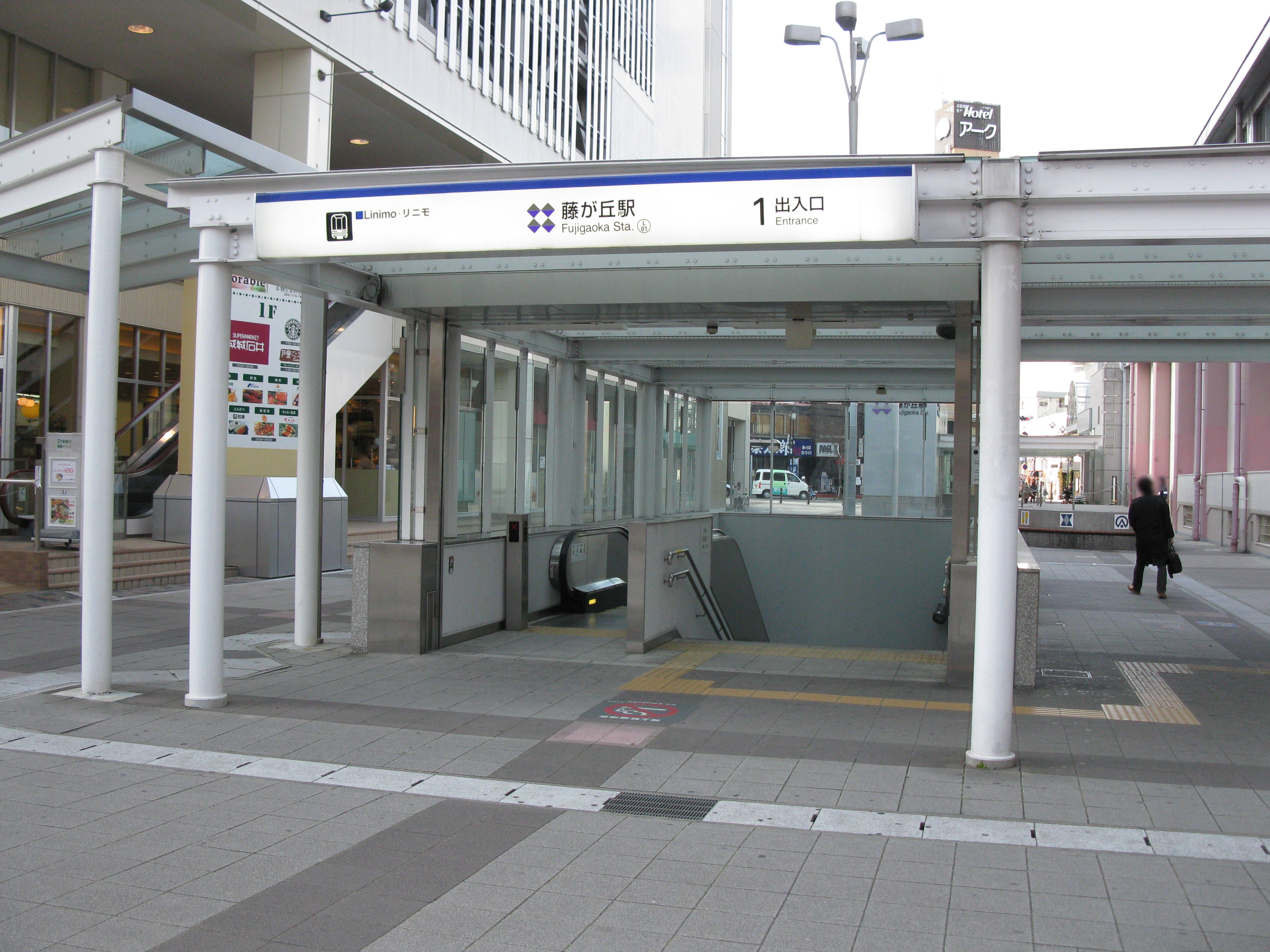

General information
- Location: Fujigaoka, Meitō, Nagoya, Aichi （名古屋市名東区藤が丘） Japan
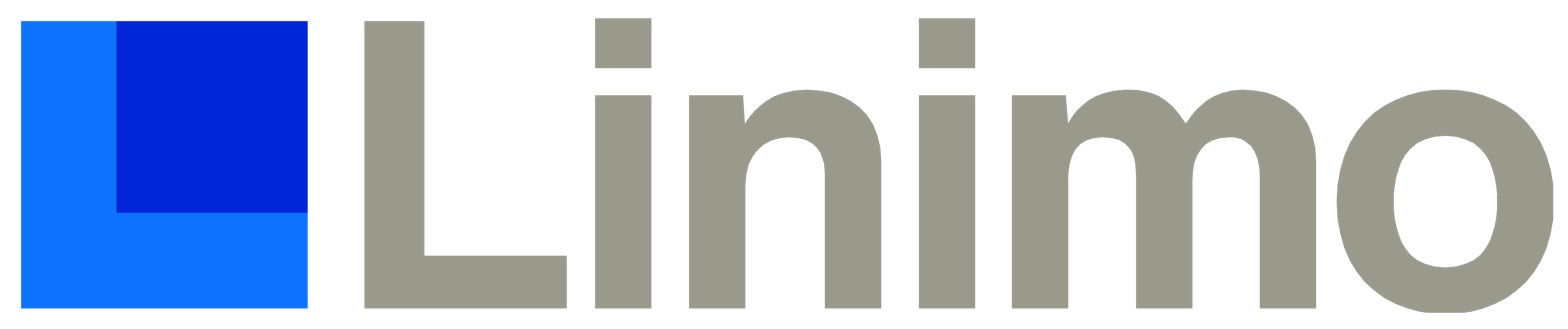
- System: Aichi Rapid Transit station
- Line: Linimo
- Connections: Bus terminal

Other information
- Station code: L01

History
- Opened: 6 March 2005

Passengers
- 2008: 13,158 daily
Location
- Location within Aichi Prefecture Location within Japan

Fujigaoka Station (藤が丘駅, Fujigaoka-eki) is a railway station in Meitō-ku, Nagoya, Aichi Prefecture, Japan

The station serving the Nagoya Municipal Subway Higashiyama Line was opened on 1 April 1969; 57 years ago, and the neighboring station of the same name serving the Linimo was opened on 6 March 2005.

== Lines ==
- Nagoya Municipal Subway
  - Higashiyama Line (Station number: H22)
- Aichi Rapid Transit
  - Linimo (Station number: L01)

== Layout ==
=== Nagoya Municipal Subway ===
==== Platforms ====
1	■ Higashiyama Line	termination track
2	■ Higashiyama Line	For Sakae, Nagoya, and Takabata (boarding passengers only)

=== Linimo ===
==== Platforms ====
1-2	■ Linimo	For Aichikyūhaku-kinen-kōen and Yakusa

== Adjacent stations ==
«	Service	»
Linimo
Terminus	-	Hanamizuki-dori
