= Higashiyamakōen Station =

Higashiyamakōen Station is the name of two train stations in Japan:

- Higashiyama Kōen Station (Nagoya), in Nagoya, Aichi Prefecture.
- Higashiyamakōen Station (Tottori)
