= Soup Stock Tokyo =

Soup Stock Tokyo Co., Ltd.
- Native name: 株式会社スープストックトーキョー
- Romanized name: Kabushiki-gaisha Sūpu Sutokku Tōkyō
- Type: Kabushiki gaisha
- Industry: Restaurants / retail
- Founded: February 1, 2016; 10 years ago
- Headquarters: Nakameguro, Meguro, Tokyo, Japan
- Key people: Masamichi Toyama (Chairman and Representative Director); Masatsugu Matsuo (President and Representative Director)
- Products: Soup restaurants and packaged soups
- Revenue: ¥10.928 billion (FY March 2024)
- Net income: ¥288.255 million (FY March 2026)
- Total assets: ¥3.441 billion (FY March 2026)
- Parent: Smiles Co., Ltd.
- Website: www.soup-stock-tokyo.com

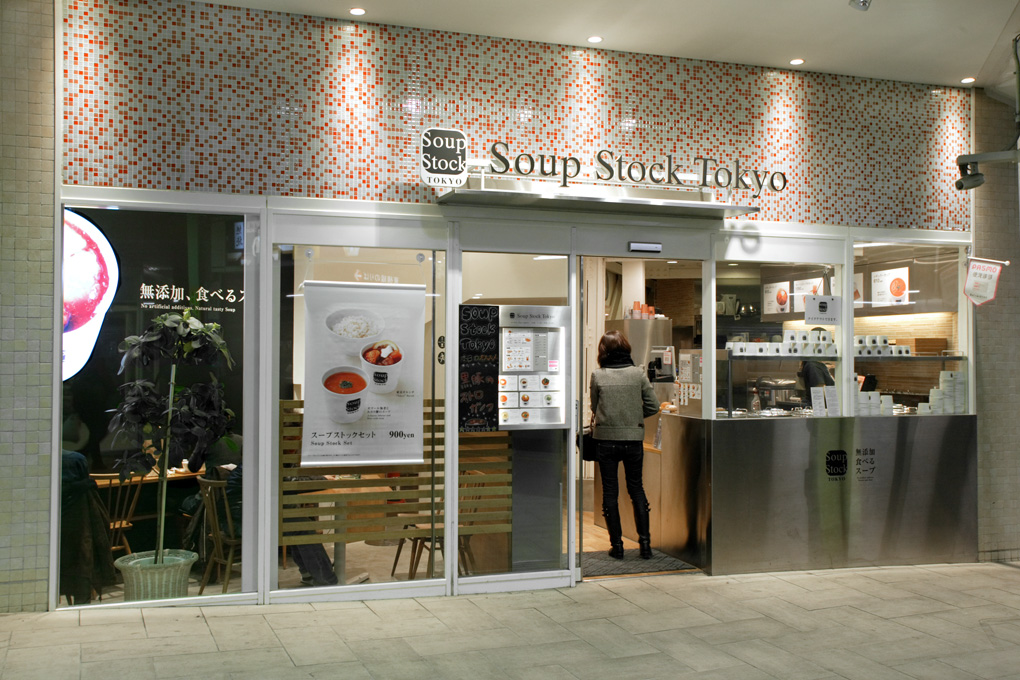
Soup Stock Tokyo's Jiyūgaoka branch, inside the station

Soup Stock Tokyo Co., Ltd. (株式会社スープストックトーキョー) is a Japanese company that operates the Soup Stock Tokyo chain of soup restaurants. The chain was originally run by its parent company, Smiles Co., Ltd.

== Overview ==
The chain's concept is "additive-free soup you can eat as a meal" (mutenka, taberu sūpu). It avoids umami seasonings and preservatives, spending extra time and money to make rich, reassuring soups that bring out the natural flavor of the ingredients. Restaurants are located mainly inside railway stations and station buildings (ekinaka), in restaurant areas of office buildings, and in the basement food halls of department stores (depachika).

The first restaurant opened in 1999 at Venus Fort in Odaiba, Tokyo. From 2000 the business was run by Smiles Co., Ltd., which was established as a subsidiary of Mitsubishi Corporation and became independent through a management buyout in February 2008. Since 2003, in addition to its restaurants, the company has sold soup by mail order and, through Kirin Beverage as the distributor, in cans at convenience stores and elsewhere.

In partnership with Japan Airlines, one of the company's products is served among the meal options in JAL's Sakura Lounge at Narita International Airport, and since 1 June 2008 the company has also supplied in-flight meals on JAL's Hawaii routes.

On 17 October 2008, Japan's Ministry of Agriculture, Forestry and Fisheries announced that "contaminated rice" (jiko beikoku, rice unfit for human consumption) shipped by Asai had been mixed into the Tokyo samgyetang that the contract manufacturer Kisco Foods produced for the company between May and July 2007.

On 1 February 2016, the business was split off from Smiles through a company split into a newly established company, Soup Stock Tokyo Co., Ltd., which has run the business since. The family restaurant 100 Spoons (100本のスプーン), formerly one of the chain's formats (in Futakotamagawa and Azamino Gardens), continued to be run by Smiles, so it no longer used the Soup Stock Tokyo name.

=== Curry Stock Tokyo ===
Since 2016, on a particular day in June, nearly all restaurants have operated for one day only as "Curry Stock Tokyo," serving no soups but only curries such as "pork cheek Bindaloo curry" and "mild keema curry with eggplant and ground beef." Exceptions are the takeaway-only Ie de taberu Soup Stock Tokyo ("Soup Stock Tokyo to eat at home"), Odashi Tokyo at Shinagawa Station, and also Soup Stock Tokyo in Jiyūgaoka (closed 31 May 2019), which continued to serve their regular soup menus. On the same day, customers who show staff "something yellow" when ordering receive "a little something good."

In 2020, because of the COVID-19 pandemic, the in-restaurant event (and the "something yellow" promotion) was cancelled and the event was held only online and, at some restaurants, through Uber Eats. In 2021 the one-day format was again dropped; instead, the event ran for 80 days, from 18 June to 5 September, with three curries rotating weekly for dine-in, takeout and (at some restaurants) delivery. During that period each Friday was designated "Happy Yellow Friday," when restaurants added one more curry (up to four).

=== Free baby food controversy (2023) ===
On 18 April 2023, the company announced that the free baby food (rinyūshoku) it had been providing at some restaurants would be offered at all restaurants from 25 April. Opinion on social media was divided over the move. On 26 April the company issued a statement, and the content of the statement was well received, after which the controversy subsided.

== Menu ==
Items on the regular menu have included:

- Tokyo borscht
- Hot and sour soup (sanrātan)
- Minestrone with Italian tomatoes
- Soup of eight vegetables and chicken
- Lobster bisque (omāru ebi = European/American lobster)
- Clam chowder
- Chili con carne
- Beef bourguignon-style stew (bīfu barī, as transcribed in the source)
- Pork cheek and tomato stroganoff
- Hungarian goulash
- Samgyetang
- Black soup with hijiki and cuttlefish ink
- Soup of green vegetables and rock salt
- Green potage of peas and soy milk
- Onion soup with roasted tomato and celery
- Cream soup of carrot and bell pepper
- Stewed chicken and onion soup
- Pumpkin soup
- Potato potage
- Brown stew of warm vegetables and cheese
- Tomato stew of vegetables and chicken

Many other items are offered, including seasonal and breakfast-only dishes. The menu varies by day and can be checked on a notice at each restaurant's entrance or on the company's official website.

== Restaurants ==
The chain has expanded mainly in the Kantō and Tōkai areas, but many restaurants have also closed, including the first restaurant at Venus Fort. Most closures were due to the expiry of the contract for use of the facility, and the company has often reopened in facilities it had previously left.

The first restaurant in the Kansai area opened inside Lucua on 4 May 2011. The chain expanded to Kyushu in May 2012, to Hokkaido in April 2019 and to the Chūgoku region in March 2025. Restaurants in Singapore (100AM and 313@Somerset) have closed.

Besides its standard restaurants, the company has run several other formats:

- Soup Stock Tokyo at Home (家で食べるスープストックトーキョー, Ie de taberu Soup Stock Tokyo): takeaway-only shops selling frozen soup.
- 'Big Soup Stock Tokyo (おおきなSoup Stock Tokyo, Ōkina Soup Stock Tokyo): a larger restaurant format.
- Also Soup Stock Tokyo: a format serving soup in pots, along with wine.
- Odashi Tokyo (おだし東京): a format serving Japanese-style dashi broth.
- YELLOW: a curry izakaya (Japanese pub).

== Publications ==
- Toyama, Masamichi (2006-02-25). スープで、いきます 商社マンがSoup Stock Tokyoを作る [Going with soup: a trading-company man creates Soup Stock Tokyo] (in Japanese). Shinchosha. ISBN 978-4-10-301151-4.
  - Paperback edition: Toyama, Masamichi (2011-03-28). 成功することを決めた―商社マンがスープで広げた共感ビジネス [I decided to succeed: the empathy business a trading-company man built with soup] (in Japanese). Shinchosha (Shinchō Bunko). ISBN 978-4-10-134861-2.

== Television ==
- Nikkei Special: Cambria Palace – "Making soup the star! A fast-food restaurant that breaks the rules" (15 July 2021, TV Tokyo)
