= Mr. Baseball =

1992 film by Fred Schepisi

- Theatrical release poster
- Directed by: Fred Schepisi
- Screenplay by: Monte Merrick; Gary Ross; Kevin Wade
- Story by: Theo Pelletier; John Junkerman
- Produced by: Fred Schepisi; Doug Claybourne; Robert Newmyer
- Starring: Tom Selleck; Dennis Haysbert; Ken Takakura
- Cinematography: Ian Baker
- Edited by: Peter Honess; Jeremy Gibbs; Gary Woodyard
- Music by: Jerry Goldsmith
- Production companies: Outlaw Productions; Pacific Artists
- Distributed by: Universal Pictures
- Release date: October 2, 1992
- Running time: 108 minutes
- Country: United States
- Languages: English; Japanese
- Budget: $40 million
- Box office: $20,883,046

Mr. Baseball is a 1992 American sports comedy film directed by Fred Schepisi, starring Tom Selleck, Ken Takakura, Dennis Haysbert, and Aya Takanashi. Selleck plays a veteran New York Yankees first baseman, Jack Elliot, who is traded to the Chunichi Dragons in Japan and must contend with cultural differences.

Mr. Baseball was released by Universal Pictures on October 2, 1992. Although the film was a limited success, it remains accurate, as of the 2020s, in portraying the peculiarities of Japanese baseball. It is used as a training resource by foreign professional baseball players who join a Japanese team.

== Plot ==
Jack Elliot is an aging American baseball player for the New York Yankees. During 1992 spring training, he is traded to the Nagoya Chunichi Dragons of Japan's Nippon Professional Baseball.

Jack clashes with Japanese culture and the team manager and alienates his new teammates. He believes the rules and management style of his new skipper, Uchiyama, are ludicrous, and continues to do things his way, which leads his already dwindling performance to suffer even more. His only ally is another American ballplayer, Max "the Hammer" Dubois, with whom he commiserates about his frustrations. However, Max is a team player on the Dragons, and warns Jack to be one too. Jack develops a relationship with Hiroko, who he discovers is Uchiyama's daughter.

After one too many outbursts, including knocking out his interpreter during a brawl, Jack is suspended from play. After meeting Hiroko's family, including Uchiyama, Uchiyama admits to Jack (in well spoken english) that he hired him over the objections of management and now his own career, not just Jack's, is in jeopardy. Dragons management wanted Pete Clifton from Boston, but Uchiyama picked Jack because he was the right choice to turn the team around. After hearing this, Jack swallows his pride and admits his deficiencies. Uchiyama becomes his mentor.

Jack apologizes to the team in Japanese. They rally around him and teach him the value of sportsmanship and respect for hard work. Uchiyama lifts his suspension and begins to work with Jack on improving his play. Jack's enthusiasm inspires the mediocre Dragons to become contenders for the Central League pennant. Jack also uses a Japanese tradition of haranguing a superior while intoxicated to convince Uchiyama to encourage his players to be more aggressive and have fun.

Jack gets the opportunity to break Uchiyama's record of seven consecutive games with a home run, but his positive response to a call from his American agent complicates his relationship with Hiroko. His newfound respect for team play becomes apparent in a crucial game against the Yomiuri Giants. With the bases loaded, two outs and his team down 6–5, the team brass expects Uchiyama to signal for a bunt to try to tie the game, even though it would deny Jack the chance to break the home run record.

Jack goes to Uchiyama and asks if he read the sign correctly. Uchiyama nods and tells him to swing away, knowing that a home run would break his record. Jack takes a called strike one with a questionable call on the first pitch. Jack fouls the second pitch back. Faced with a no-ball, two-strike count, Jack sees the Giants' infield is playing deep and bunts. The Giants are caught off-guard and the bunt is successful in allowing the tying run to cross home plate. As the Giants struggle to field the ball, Jack, approaching first base, veers slightly inside the baseline and knocks over the Giants' pitcher covering first on the play, which allows the winning run to score from second base.

With the Dragons winning the pennant, Uchiyama can keep his job and Max ends his five-year career in NPB by signing with the Los Angeles Dodgers. Jack marries Hiroko and becomes a coach and mentor with the Detroit Tigers. One of the players calls him Chief, which he called Uchiyama in Japan.

== Cast ==
- Tom Selleck as Jack Elliot
- Ken Takakura as Uchiyama
- Aya Takanashi as Hiroko Uchiyama
- Dennis Haysbert as Max "Hammer" Dubois
- Toshi Shioya as Yoji Nishimura
- Mak Takano as Shinji Igarashi
- Nicholas Cascone as "Doc"
- Kosuke Toyohara as Toshi Yamashita
- Toshizo Fujiwara as Ryo Mukai
- Charles Fick as Billy Stevens
- Leon Lee as Lyle Massey
- Bradley "Animal" Lesley as Alan Niven
- Frank Thomas as Ricky Davis
- Jun Hamamura as Hiroko's Grandfather
- Sean McDonough as Sean McDonough
- Larry Pennell as Howie Gold
- Norihide Goto as Issei Itoi

== Production ==
=== Screenplay ===
According to Schepisi, the premise for Mr. Baseball — a baseball comedy that explored cultural differences between Japan and the United States—was conceived after the commercial success of the 1989 film Major League. The first story treatment was drafted by Theo Pelletier, a writer with no previous film credits to his name, and developed into a screenplay by Monte Merrick and Gary Ross. When Schepisi came onto the project, Tom Selleck had already been cast as the lead, and because of an unusual clause in his contract, had final say over the approval of the script. This resulted in the involvement of another screenwriter, Kevin Wade.

Complicating matters was the takeover of Universal Studios by the Japanese conglomerate Matsushita. Universal was concerned about issues of cultural sensitivity in the depiction of Japanese characters, so they recruited John Junkerman, an experienced writer and director of films about Japan, to rework the story. Schepisi and a fourth screenwriter, Ed Solomon, traveled to Japan to do research.

After returning from Japan, Schepisi and Solomon rewrote the entire script, highlighting cultural clashes between the characters for comic effect, but this version in turn was rewritten by Kevin Wade to accommodate Tom Selleck. Since Wade's contract expired mid-way through production, however, he only worked on it for about three weeks, leaving many loose ends that eventually had to be sorted out by Schepisi. In the end, the participation of many people in the process resulted in a screenplay that was much more conventional than Schepisi originally intended.

In a later interview, he said he felt as though the film was not as good as it could have been:

[It] was just supposed to be about cultural differences using the baseball game, but also there was much funnier stuff. When he goes down to see the father and there's the noodle scene, all of that, that's the kind of humour that could have been throughout the whole film. Again the studio and Tom Selleck had script approval, which I didn't realise when I agreed to do it. I went in to help them out. They didn't understand it, so they pulled it into the conventional.

=== Filming ===
Filming of Mr. Baseball took place primarily in Nagoya, with limited filming in Tokyo, Florida, and New York. Doug Claybourne, one of the producers, began preparation for location filming in Japan in 1991. Most scenes were filmed in the city of Nagoya, including a number that were eventually cut from the film. Most prominent are the scenes filmed at Nagoya Stadium, the former home of the Chunichi Dragons in Otobashi, Nagoya. Thousands of local extras volunteered to sit in the stands during the filming of game situations, even braving a typhoon to cheer on the fictionalized Dragons during their climactic showdown with the Yomiuri Giants.

Filming of other scenes did not range very far from the stadium. Two scenes of Jack Elliot and his interpreter Yoji (Toshi Shioya), were filmed on the Meitetsu Line shuttling between Nagoya Station and Kanayama Station. The scenes at Jack Elliot's suite apartment were filmed at the Tsukimi-ga-oka Mansion complex in Kakuozan, a thirty-minute subway and local train ride from the stadium. The scene in which Jack is interviewed by Makoto Kuno, MC of the CBC TV sports program Sunday Dragons, was filmed on the actual set of the program (although, as Kuno has noted, the shot was very brief and he had no opportunity to speak with Selleck on set). Scenes of Jack and Hiroko's visit to local shrines were filmed at the Ōsu Kannon marketplace, near the heart of the city's commercial district. Sequentially, the scenes at Ōsu begin with Jack praying and clanging the bell at Fuji Sengen Shrine, before moving to Banshō-ji to offer incense. The building that housed Hiroko's "Concepts Graphic Designs" still stands in the Minami-yama/Hibari-ga-oka neighborhood of Nagoya, although the Minami-yama Pharmacy located next door has since changed locations to Irinaka. A scene in which Jack meets a group of other expatriate American ballplayers at a foreigners' bar was filmed in Sakae, on the site of the current Shooter's.

Only two scenes set in Japan were filmed outside of Nagoya:

1. Jack's "Big Hit, Happy Body" commercial, filmed in a tea field overlooking Mikawa Bay.
2. Jack's visits to the home of his manager, Uchiyama, which appear to have been filmed in the Komaki or Inuyama area.

Commenting on his working relationship with Selleck, Schepisi commented: "He was extremely helpful getting the baseball thing right. Getting the American pride thing right."

==== Alternate scenes ====
Three scenes that were eventually cut from the North American release of the film (but retained in the Japanese release) were also filmed in Nagoya. All three scenes cast light on Jack's relationships with Uchiyama and Hiroko. These include:

1. an exchange between Jack and Hiroko in Osu, in the arcade leading down to Bansho-ji Temple.
2. an exchange between Jack and Hiroko in front of Tsukimi-ga-oka Mansion.
3. a dialogue between Jack and Uchiyama (Ken Takakura) in the Heiwa Park cemetery.

=== Stadiums ===
Throughout the film, the Dragons play every team in the Japanese Central League except the Hanshin Tigers and Yakult Swallows (although Yoji quotes from an article from Chunichi Sports newspaper praising a leaping catch that Jack made to close the door against the Swallows). Nearly all are home games, filmed at Nagoya Baseball Stadium with extras in the stands. The only road game the Dragons play in the film is against the Hiroshima Toyo Carp, filmed on location at nearby Okazaki Stadium in Aichi Prefecture. The Yokohama Taiyo Whales were rebranded the Yokohama BayStars by the time the film premiered in Japan in February 1993. The spring training baseball scene was filmed at Dedeaux Field on the campus of the University of Southern California.

=== Uniforms ===
All the uniforms, caps, and training gear featured in the film are authentic and current at the time of release. The Los Angeles Dodgers-inspired uniforms that the Chunichi Dragons players wear in the film—with the royal blue caps emblazoned with white "D" insignias in Casey font—are the same that the Dragons wore between 1987 and 1996. Oddly, the insignia on the Dragons cap is changed in the American theatrical release poster, emblazoned instead with a more angular "D" topped by a macron. The Dragons have never worn a cap like this.

The Detroit Tigers cap that Selleck wears in the last scene of the film, when he is coaching a rookie at the Tigers spring training facility, is the same cap he donned while playing the role of Thomas Magnum in the classic television series Magnum, P.I. Tom Selleck, who hails from Detroit, Michigan, is a lifelong Detroit Tigers fan and former minority shareholder of the team.

=== Real-life inspiration ===
While the movie is entirely fictitious, certain characters and scenes are based on real-life personalities and events. The character of Uchiyama, manager of the team, is very closely based on Senichi Hoshino, who managed the Dragons from 1987 to 1991 (he returned to manage the Dragons from 1996 to 2001). The scene in which Elliot taunts an opposing pitcher who refuses to throw him a strike by gripping the bat upside down was apparently based on a real-life incident. Western player Randy Bass, playing for the Hanshin Tigers who was challenging Japan's single-season home run record in 1985, also tauntingly turned his bat around in protest. Similarly, Hankyu Braves player Daryl Spencer did this as he was challenging an offensive Triple Crown in 1965. The African American sidekick role, played by Dennis Haysbert, is believed to be based on the experiences of several African American players in Japan, including brothers Leron Lee and Leon Lee (who was a consultant on the film and has a cameo role).

=== Advisors ===
Many former players, baseball historians, and Japan experts served as advisors on the film, including former Lotte/Yokohama/Yakult slugger Leon Lee (who also makes a brief cameo in the film) and former MLB/Yakult Swallows player Doug DeCinces. Brad Lesley, another former American expat baseball player, has a small role in the film, as Alan Niven—playing a slugger rather than his natural position of relief pitcher.

== Promotion ==
Universal released a theatrical trailer for Mr Baseball in the summer of 1992. The trailer, which runs two minutes and fourteen seconds, features dialogue and scenes that are absent from the final version of the film.

For example, at the scene of Jack's first press conference, Yoji asks, "have you ever slept with Madonna?" During his first meeting with Uchiyama, Jack responds to the demand to shave his moustache by saying, "he probably can't even grow one." In the locker room scene where Jack is confused about how to use the Japanese-style toilet, he quips to Max, "I need somebody to tell me how to go to the can" (later changed in the final version of the film to "I need somebody to tell me how to take a crap").

The music in the trailer is mostly sampled from Jerry Goldsmith's soundtrack, but also includes samples from "Turning Japanese" by The Vapors. The song also appears in the MCA Universal Home Video promotional tape distributed to video rental shops in 1993. "Turning Japanese" did not appear in the final version of the soundtrack.

== Reception ==
=== Critical reception ===
Mr. Baseball holds an 11% rating on Rotten Tomatoes based on 18 reviews. Audiences gave the film a 41% rating. Audiences polled by CinemaScore gave the film an average grade of "B+" on an A+ to F scale.

Kevin Thomas of the Los Angeles Times wrote, "Mr. Baseball ... racks up a real home run for Tom Selleck," comparing him to Clark Gable. Bill Diehl of ABC called Mr. Baseball "uproariously funny", while Steve Wille of Sports Illustrated wrote, "Tom Selleck deserves a baseball Oscar."

Siskel and Ebert commented on its formulaic plot and lackluster writing, but also praised the realistic crowd shots, direction, and Jerry Goldsmith's soundtrack. Janet Maslin of The New York Times praised Selleck, writing, "The character of Jack, whose being sent to Japan is the impetus for Mr. Baseball, provides Mr. Selleck with something unusual: a movie role that actually suits his talents. Mr. Selleck's easygoing, self-deprecating manner works particularly well when he lets himself look silly, as he often does here."

=== Box office ===
Mr. Baseball opened in 1,855 theaters on Friday, October 2, 1992. During its first weekend, it grossed over $5 million at the box office, coming in third behind The Last of the Mohicans and The Mighty Ducks. During its six-week run in theatres, it went on to gross $20.8 million domestically.

Despite the limited marketability of baseball movies overseas, Universal positioned it for a wide distribution beyond the North American market. However, a disappointing showing in Japan and Europe prevented the studio from recouping on its enormous expenses. Mr. Baseball (ミスター・ベースボール) opened in theaters in Japan on February 6, 1993, and proceeded to gross a disappointing ¥150 million ($1.25 million).

By the end of its run in Japan, during the summer of 1993, it appeared as the "B film" in Universal double features—such as with the Robert Redford and River Phoenix film Sneakers (1992). Screenings in European theatres followed, but with little fanfare. It premiered in Germany on June 16, 1993.

=== Fan culture in Nagoya ===
Since 2011, an American fan dressed as Jack Elliot has garnered media attention for his enthusiastic support of the Chunichi Dragons, especially their minor-league affiliate, which plays in the old Nagoya Stadium — the setting of the film.

=== Home media ===
MCA Universal Home Video released Mr. Baseball on VHS and LaserDisc in March 1993. It was first released on DVD by Goodtimes Home Video in April 1999 and later reissued by Universal in July 2017. Universal later released the film on Blu-ray in June 2019.

=== By professional players ===
Mr. Baseball has found a niche audience in foreign professional baseball players who join a Japanese team. They use the film to prepare themselves for what they are about to experience. According to baseball players interviewed by The New York Times in 2022, the film still accurately portrays the differences between American and Japanese baseball.

== See also ==
- Baseball in Japan
- List of baseball films
