= Sugiyama Jogakuen University Junior College =

Coordinates: 35°09′43.06″N 136°59′23″E

- 椙山女学園大学短期大学部
- Type: Private
- Active: 1969–2001
- Faculty: Japanese literature English literature
- Students: about 700
- Location: Chikusa-ku Nagoya Aichi Prefecture, Japan

Sugiyama Jogakuen University Junior College (椙山女学園大学短期大学部, Sugiyama Jogakuen Daigaku Tanki Daigaku) was a junior college in Chikusa-ku Nagoya Aichi Prefecture, Japan, and was part of the Sugiyama Jogakuen network.

- The Junior College was founded in 1969 as an attached to Sugiyama Jogakuen University.
- There were two courses in this Junior College, the students ware major in Japanese literature or English literature.
- Some students included in Sugiyama Jogakuen University, Aichi University, Ritsumeikan University and others after graduation.
- In 2001 the Junior College was closed.
