= Hoshigaoka Station (Nagoya) =

Metro station in Nagoya, Japan

Coordinates: 35.1622°N 136.985°E

H18 Hoshigaoka Station 星ヶ丘駅
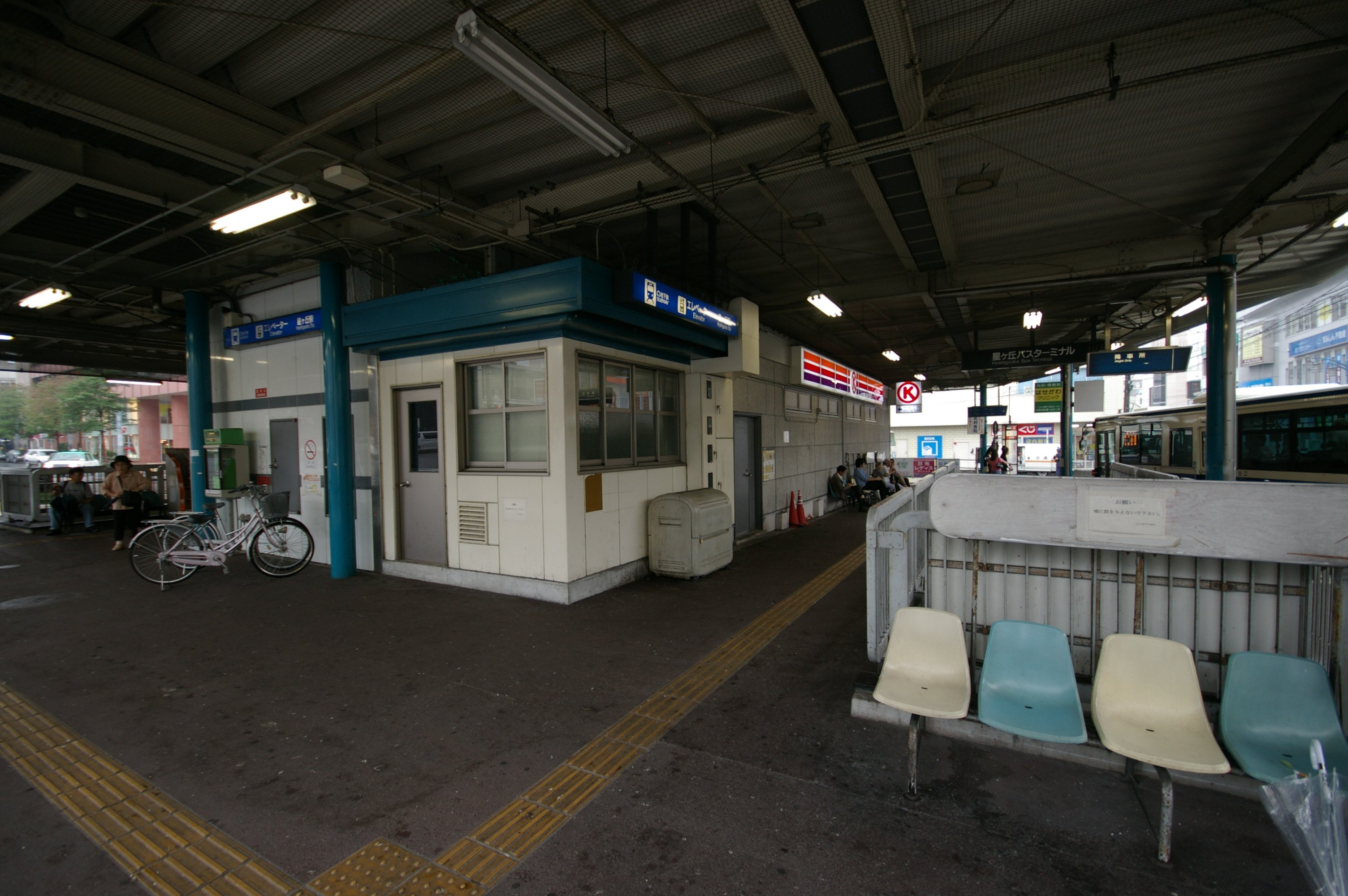
- Hoshigaoka Station

General information
- Location: 85-1 Inoue, Chikusa, Nagoya, Aichi （名古屋市千種区井上町85-1） Japan
- System: Nagoya Municipal Subway station
- Operator: Transportation Bureau City of Nagoya
- Line: Higashiyama Line
- Connections: Bus terminal

Other information
- Station code: H18

History
- Opened: 30 March 1967; 59 years ago

Passengers
- 2009: 24,523 daily

Services
Preceding station	Nagoya Municipal Subway	Following station
Higashiyama Kōen H17 towards Takabata	Higashiyama Line	Issha H19 towards Fujigaoka
Location

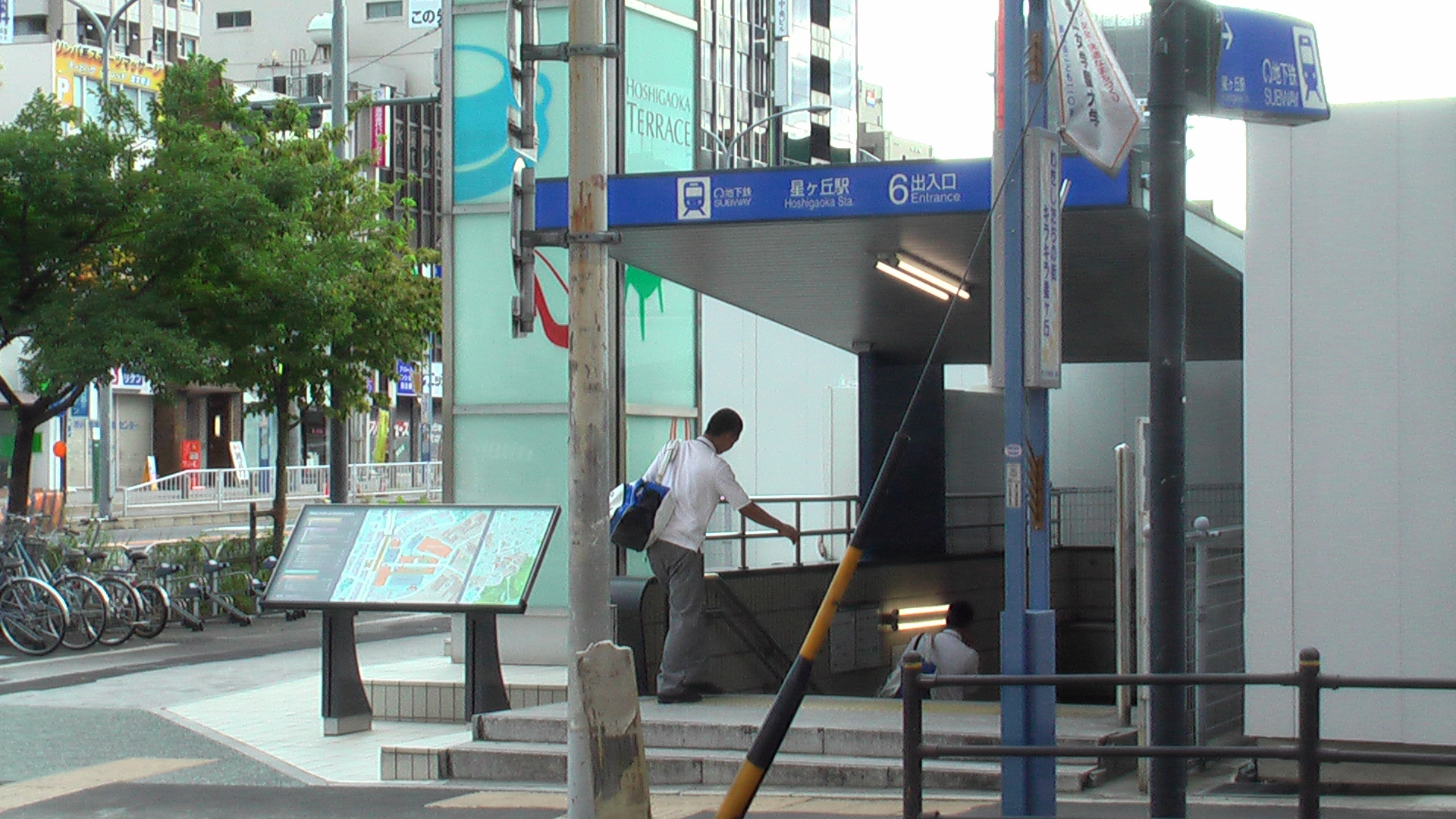
Number 6 entrance to the station.

Hoshigaoka Station (星ヶ丘駅, Hoshigaoka-eki) is an underground metro station located in Chikusa-ku, Nagoya, Aichi Prefecture, Japan operated by the Nagoya Municipal Subway's Higashiyama Line. It is located 16.2 rail kilometers from the terminus of the Higashiyama Line at Takabata Station. This station provides access to Sugiyama Jogakuen University.

== History ==
Hoshigaoka Station was opened on 30 March 1967.

== Lines ==
- Nagoya Municipal Subway
  - Higashiyama Line (Station number: H18)

== Layout ==
Hoshigaoka Station

=== Platforms ===
1	■ Higashiyama Line	For Fujigaoka
2	■ Higashiyama Line	For Sakae, Nagoya, and Takabata

== Surrounding area ==
- Higashiyama Zoo and Botanical Gardens (東山動植物園)
- Sugiyama Jogakuen University (椙山女学園大学)
- Hoshigaoka Mitsukoshi (星ヶ丘三越)
