= Aichi Shukutoku Junior College =

Junior college in Japan

Coordinates: 35°09′36.23″N 137°00′16.10″E

- 愛知淑徳短期大学
- Type: Private
- Active: 1961–2002
- Faculty: Home Economics; Japanese Literature; English and American language communication
- Location: Chikusa-ku, Nagoya, Aichi Prefecture, Japan

Aichi Shukutoku Junior College (愛知淑徳短期大学, Aichi Shukutoku Tanki Daigaku) was a junior college in Chikusa-ku, Nagoya, Japan.

The college was founded in 1961. The predecessor of the school, Aichi Shukutoku Girls' School, was founded in 1905. The college closed in 2002.
