= Hoshigaoka Station =

Hoshigaoka Station is the name of two train stations in Japan:

- Hoshigaoka Station (Nagoya) in Nagoya, Aichi Prefecture.
- Hoshigaoka Station (Osaka)
