= Yoki =

Yoki or Yōki may refer to:

== People ==
- Jojo Yoki, a Czech paraglider
- Youki Kojima (小島 裕規; born 1991), Japanese music producer
- Youki Kudoh (工藤 夕貴; born 1971), Japanese actress and singer
- Youki Yamamoto, (born 1973) Japanese musician

== Characters ==
- Youki, a character in the manga series 'Tis Time for "Torture," Princess
- Youki, a character in the tokusatsu television series Jikuu Senshi Spielban
- Yoki, a character in the manga series Fullmetal Alchemist
- Yokiko Nekogami, also known as Yoki, a character in the manga series Yoki Koto Kiku

== Others ==
- Yoki, the Canadian name for Chinese jump rope
- Yōki, a Japanese religious concept related to yōkai and qi

== See also ==
- Yōki-sō, a Japanese villa and gardens in Chikusa-ku, Nagoya
- Joyous Life (yōki yusan or yōki gurashi), a Tenrikyo belief and doctrine
