= Higashiyama Kōen Station (Nagoya) =

Metro station in Nagoya, Japan

Coordinates: 35.1606°N 136.973°E

H17 Higashiyama Kōen Station 東山公園駅
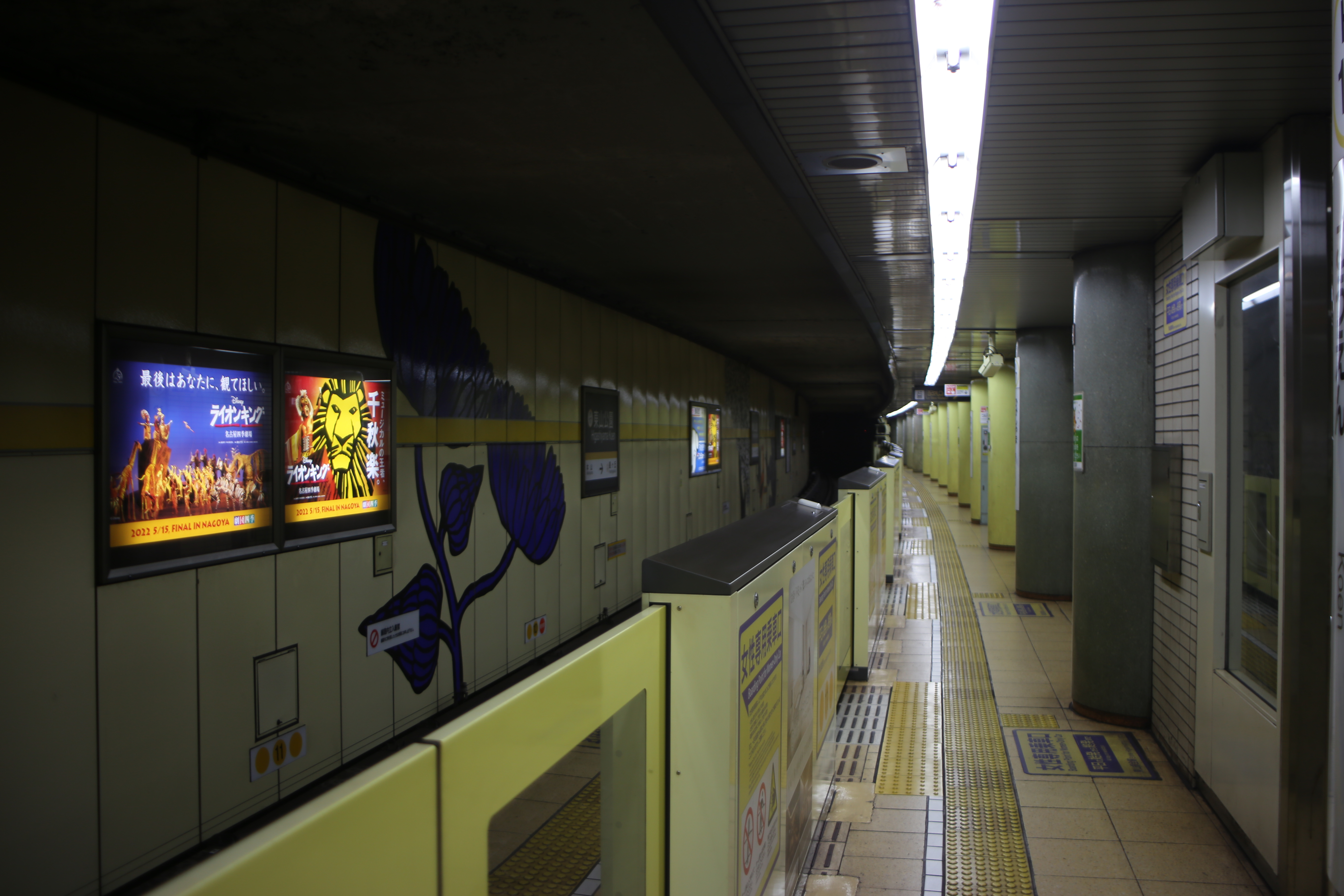

General information
- Location: Higashiyamatōri 5–1, Chikusa, Nagoya, Aichi （名古屋市千種区東山通五丁目1） Japan
- System: Nagoya Municipal Subway station
- Operator: Transportation Bureau City of Nagoya
- Line: Higashiyama Line
- Connections: Bus stop

Other information
- Station code: H17

History
- Opened: 1 April 1963; 63 years ago

Passengers
- 2009: 7,144 daily

Services
Preceding station	Nagoya Municipal Subway	Following station
Motoyama H16 towards Takabata	Higashiyama Line	Hoshigaoka H18 towards Fujigaoka
Location

Higashiyama Kōen (Higashiyama Park) Station (東山公園駅, Higashiyama Kōen-eki) is an underground metro station located in Chikusa-ku, Nagoya, Aichi Prefecture, Japan operated by the Nagoya Municipal Subway's Higashiyama Line. It is located 15.1 rail kilometers from the terminus of the Higashiyama Line at Takabata Station.

== History ==
Higashiyama Kōen Station was opened on 1 April 1963. The wicket gates were automated to use the Manaca smart card system from 11 February 2011.

== Lines ==
- Nagoya Municipal Subway
  - Higashiyama Line (Station number: H17)

== Layout ==
Higashiyama Kōen Station has a single underground island platform.

=== Platforms ===
1	■ Higashiyama Line	For Fujigaoka
2	■ Higashiyama Line	For Sakae, Nagoya, and Takabata
