= Sugiyama Jogakuen University =

University in Nagoya, Japan

- 椙山女学園大学
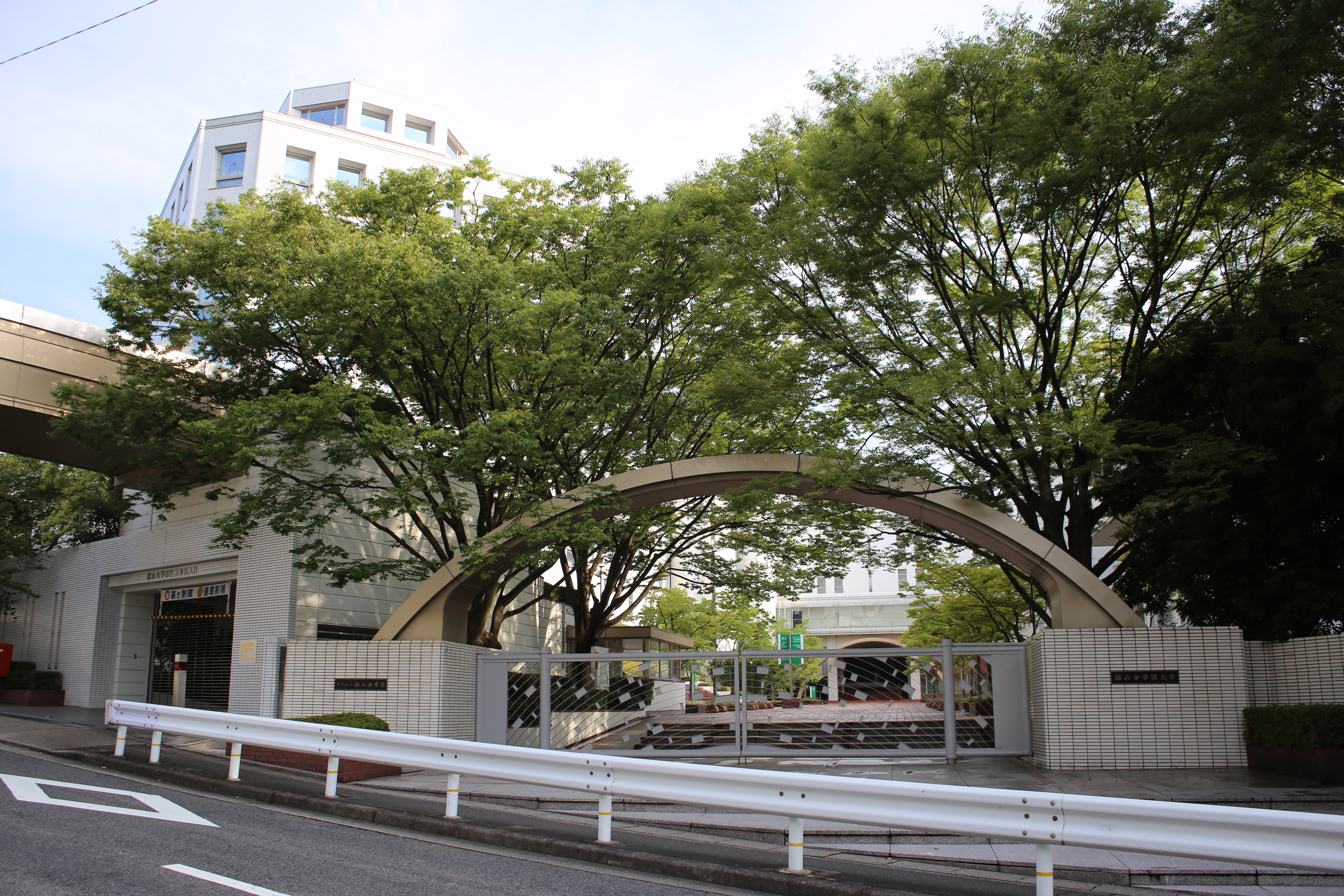
- Sugiyama Jogakuen University, Hoshigaoka Campus
- Type: Private; Women's college
- Established: 1905
- Location: Chikusa-ku, Nagoya, Japan; 35.1592°N 136.9871°E
- Campus: Urban
- Website: www.sugiyama-u.ac.jp/ciep/english/

Sugiyama Jogakuen University (椙山女学園大学, Sugiyama jogakuen daigaku) is a private women's college in Hoshigaoka in Chikusa-ku, Nagoya, Japan, with a subsidiary campus in the city of Nisshin. The predecessor of the school was founded in 1905 as a sewing school, and it was chartered as a university in 1949.

Locally, it is famous as one of the "SSK" schools of Nagoya: Aichi Shukutoku University, Kinjo Gakuin University, and this university. It is close to Hoshigaoka Station on the municipal subway's Higashiyama Line.
