= Heiwa Park, Nagoya =

City park and cemetery in Japan

Coordinates: 35°10′13″N 136°58′46″E

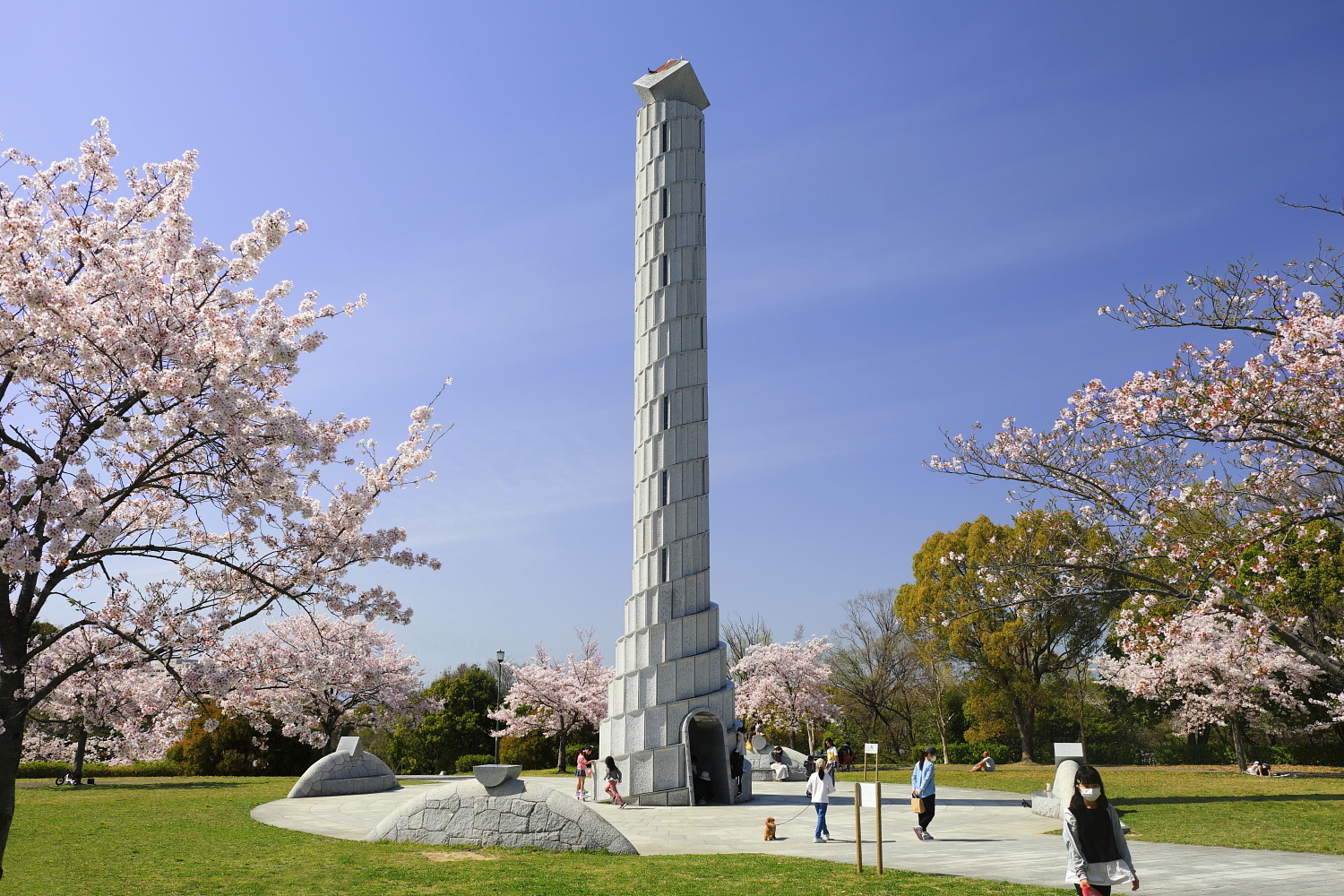
The Rainbow Tower

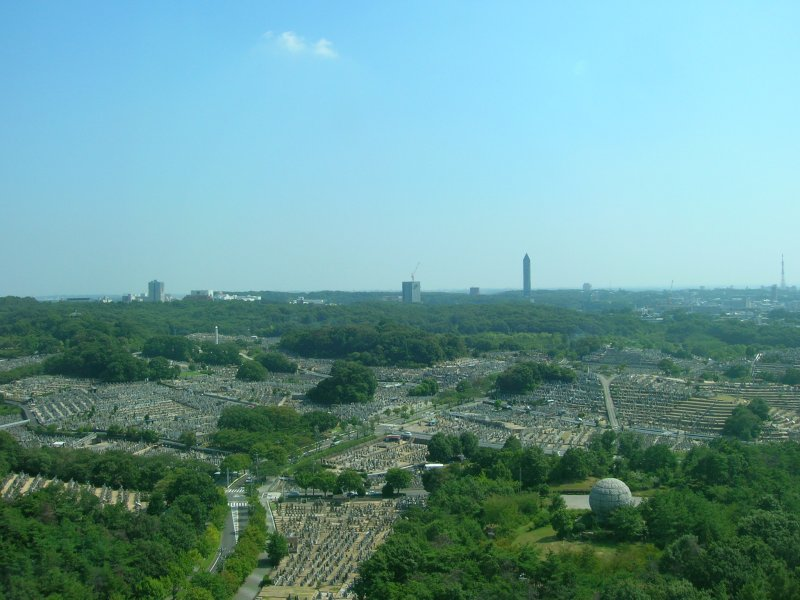
View from Heiwa park aqua tower.

Heiwa Park (平和公園) is a public park is located in Chikusa-ku, Nagoya in central Japan.

The spacious park on the eastern side of the city has an area of around 150 hectares. It is dedicated to peace. The park is popular amongst visitors especially during the Hanami season in spring. The park features a statue of Kannon, the boddhisatva of mercy, trails through the woodlands, ponds and a large cemetery. Also in there still exists the Tomb of Matsudaira Senchiyo, 8th son of Tokugawa Ieyasu, the first shōgun of Tokugawa Shogunate.

Access by public transport is by Jiyūgaoka Station with Meijō Line or Higashiyama Koen Station on the Higashiyama Line.

If the Nagoya bid for the 1988 Summer Olympics succeeded, a stadium was planned to be built inside the park.
