= Chayagasaka Station =

Metro station in Nagoya, Japan

Coordinates: 35.1844°N 136.9621°E

M15 Chayagasaka Station 茶屋ヶ坂駅
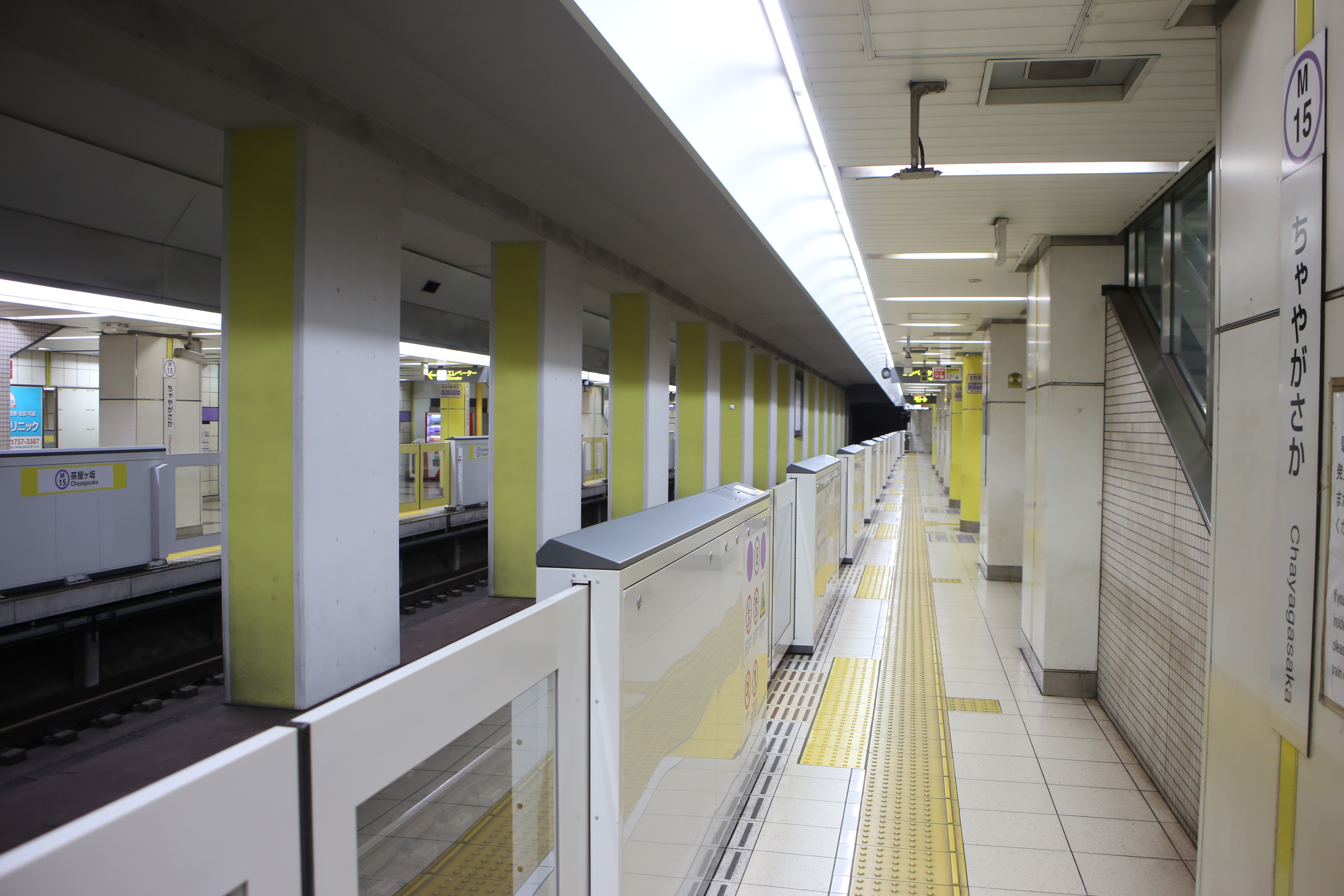

General information
- Location: Chayagasaka 1-2116, Chikusa, Nagoya, Aichi （名古屋市千種区茶屋が坂一丁目2116） Japan
- System: Nagoya Municipal Subway station
- Operator: Transportation Bureau City of Nagoya
- Line: Meijō Line
- Connections: Bus terminal

Other information
- Station code: M15

History
- Opened: 13 December 2003; 22 years ago

Passengers
- 2008: 6,009 daily

Services
Preceding station	Nagoya Municipal Subway	Following station
Sunadabashi M14 anticlockwise	Meijō Line	Jiyūgaoka M16 clockwise
Location

Chayagasaka Station (茶屋ヶ坂駅, Chayagasaka-eki) is a railway station in Chikusa-ku, Nagoya, Aichi Prefecture, Japan.

It was opened on 13 December 2003.

== Lines ==
- Nagoya Municipal Subway
  - Meijō Line (Station number: M15)

== Layout ==
=== Platforms ===
1	■ Meijō Line	For Ōzone and Sakae
2	■ Meijō Line	For Motoyama and Yagoto
