= Yōki-sō =

Japanese villa in Chikusa-Ku

Coordinates: 35.1706°N 136.9559°E

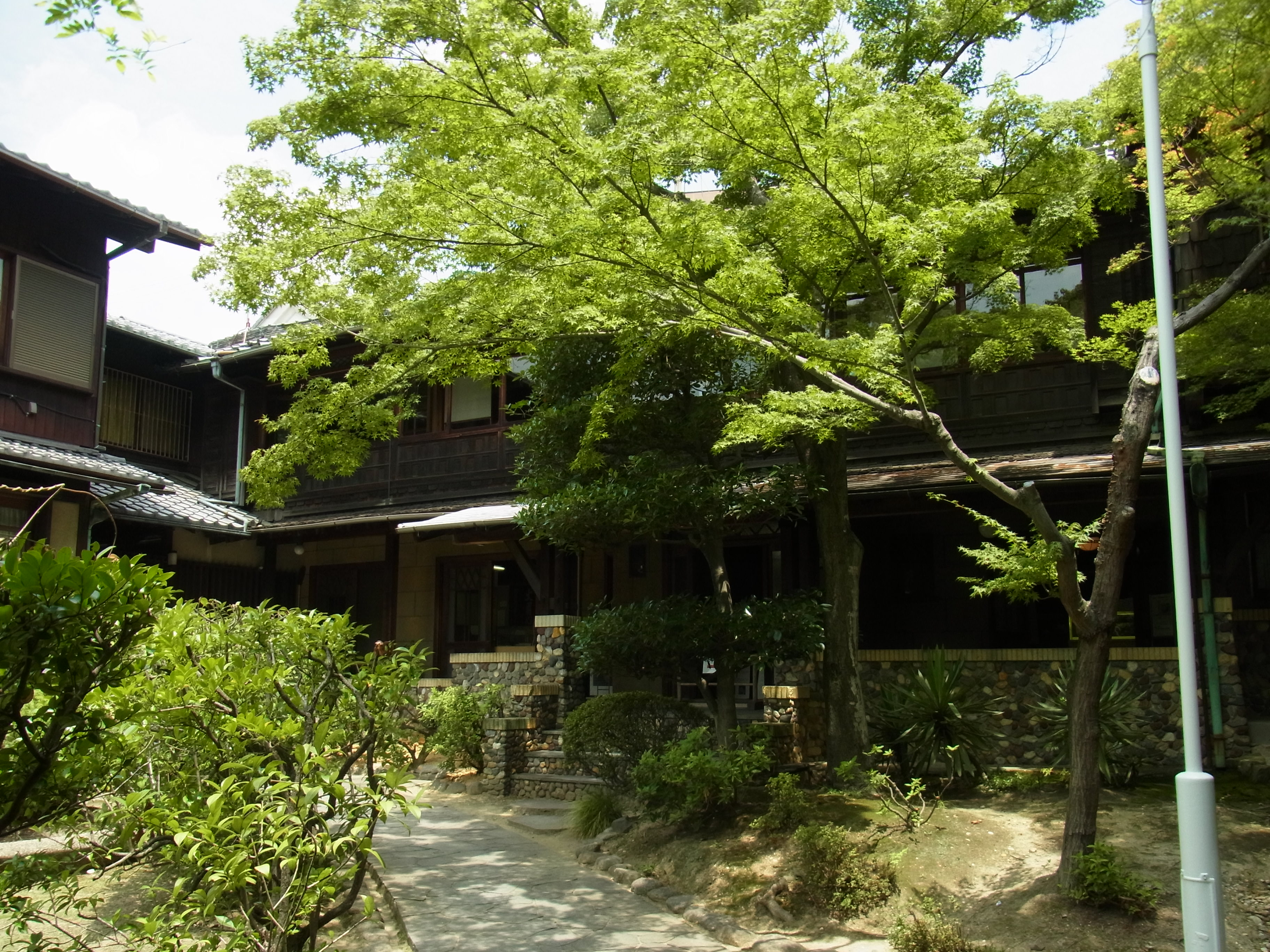
Yōki-sō villa in Nagoya

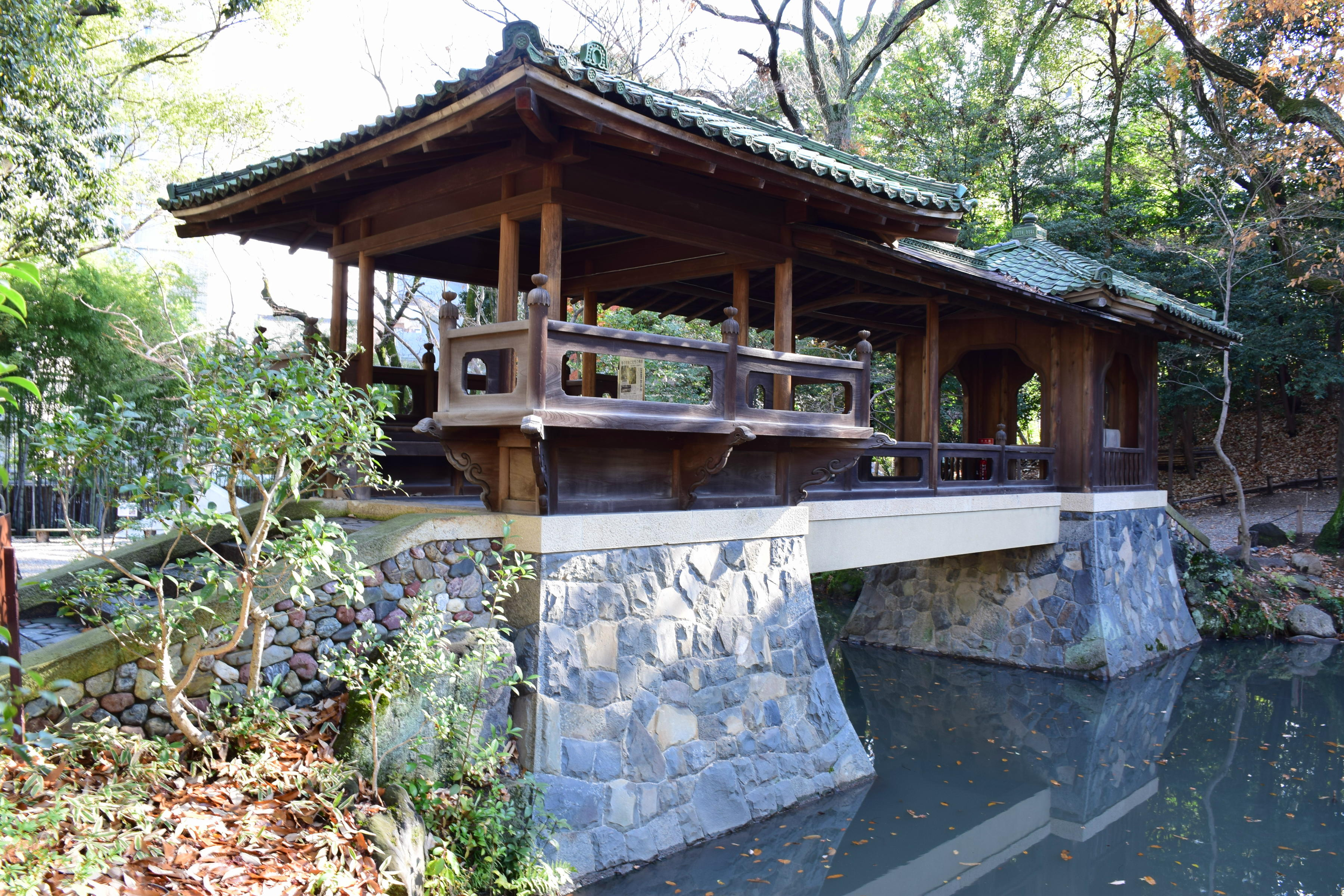
Hakuun Bridge

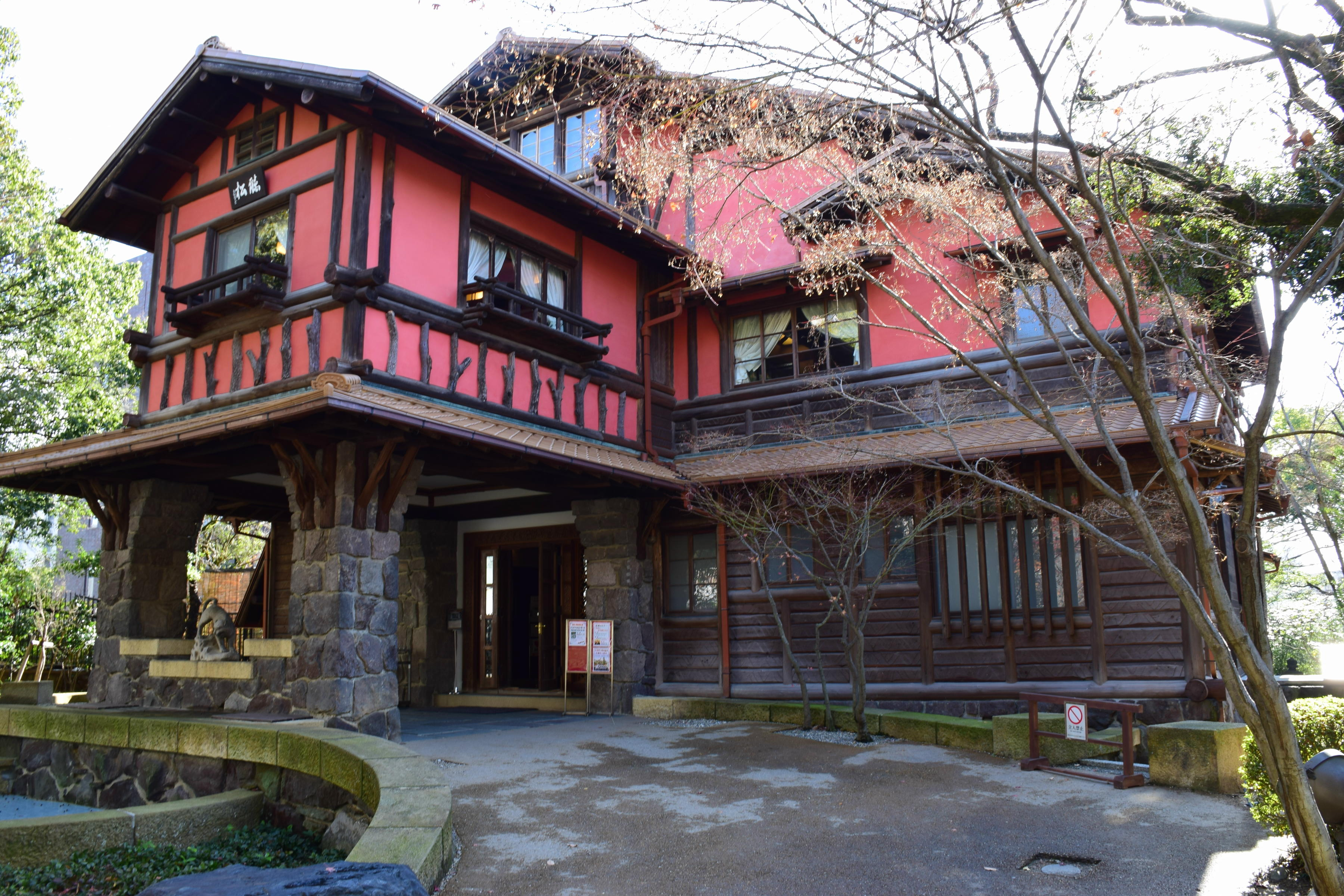
Choshokaku building

Yōki-sō (揚輝荘) is a Japanese villa and gardens located in Chikusa-ku, Nagoya, central Japan. It is close to Nittai-ji temple.

== History ==
The grounds were built for Itō Suketami (1878-1940), the president of the Matsuzakaya Company, from the 1910s to the 1930s. A number of historic structures throughout Japan that were endangered were acquired by him, disassembled, transported and reassembled on his property. During the bombing of Nagoya in World War II in March 1945, a number of structures were destroyed.

Most of those that have remained have been designated as Tangible Cultural Property by the city. Parts of the estate were sold off so the property is now divided in two halves. The grounds today are administered by a non-profit organisation.

== Northern premises ==
- Bangaro was designed by Teiji Suzuki for Itō Suketami as his cottage. Upstairs it has a Japanese tea ceremony room that was originally from the Tokugawa lords of the Owari Domain. The checkerboard pattern on the wall is called ichimazu and can also be found on the brick chimney outside. The building is a blend of Japanese and western architecture.
- Hakuun Bridge
- Sanshotei
- North Garden

== Southern premises ==
- Choshokaku reception hall, constructed in c.1935, renovated in 2013
- Yōki-sō Zashiki
- South Garden
