= Jiyūgaoka Station =

Jiyūgaoka Station may refer to:

- Jiyūgaoka Station (Tokyo) -- (自由が丘駅) A station in Tokyo, operated by Tokyo Kyuko Electric Railway.
- Jiyūgaoka Station (Nagoya) -- (自由ヶ丘駅) A station in Nagoya, Aichi Prefecture, operated by Transportation Bureau City of Nagoya.
