= Jiyūgaoka Station (Nagoya) =

Metro station in Nagoya, Japan

Coordinates: 35°10′31.8828″N 136°58′0.1128″E

M16 Jiyūgaoka Station 自由ヶ丘駅
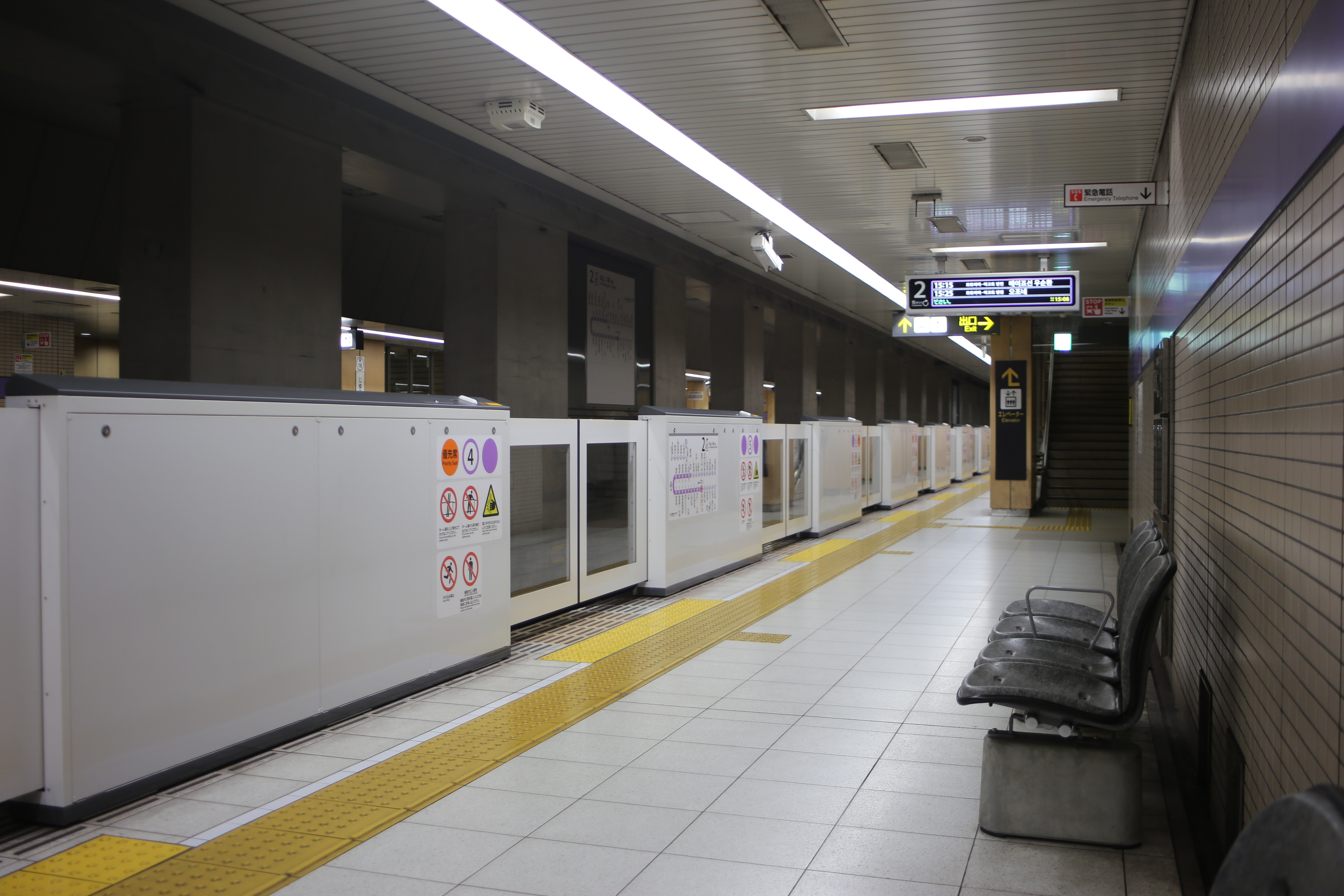

General information
- Location: Jiyūgaoka 3-11, Chikusa, Nagoya, Aichi （名古屋市千種区自由ヶ丘三丁目11） Japan
- System: Nagoya Municipal Subway station
- Operator: Transportation Bureau City of Nagoya
- Line: Meijō Line
- Connections: Bus stop

Other information
- Station code: M16

History
- Opened: 13 December 2003; 22 years ago

Passengers
- 2008: 5,932 daily

Services
Preceding station	Nagoya Municipal Subway	Following station
Chayagasaka M15 anticlockwise	Meijō Line	Motoyama M17 clockwise
Location

Jiyūgaoka Station (自由ヶ丘駅, Jiyūgaoka-eki) is a railway station in Chikusa-ku, Nagoya, Aichi Prefecture, Japan.

It was opened on 13 December 2003; 22 years ago.

This station provides access to Heiwa Park, Aichi Prefectural Shiroyama Hospital, and Aichi Cancer Center Hospital.

== Lines ==
- Nagoya Municipal Subway
  - Meijō Line (Station number: M16)

== Layout ==
=== Platforms ===
1	■ Meijō Line	For Ōzone and Sakae
2	■ Meijō Line	For Motoyama and Yagoto
