= Aichi Shukutoku University =

Aixhi Shukutoku University of Japan

- 愛知淑徳大学
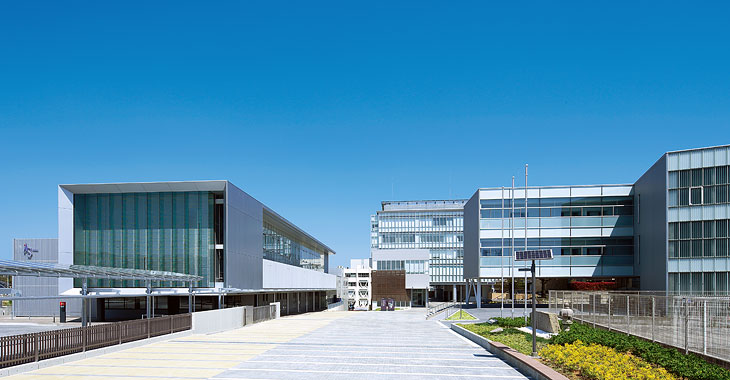
- Nagakute Campus
- Motto: 違いを共に生きる (chigai o tomo ni ikiru)
- Motto in English: Living with Diversity
- Type: Private
- Established: 1905
- Affiliations: Aichi Shukutoku Gakuen
- Students: 8,905 (as of May 2015)
- Location: Nagakute, Aichi, Japan; 35.1574°N 137.0316°E
- Campus: Nagakute Campus (Nagakute City) Hoshigaoka Campus (Nagoya City)
- Website: www.aasa.ac.jp/english/index.html

Aichi Shukutoku University (愛知淑徳大学, Aichi shukutoku daigaku) is a private university in Nagakute, Aichi, Japan. The predecessor of the school was founded in 1905. It was chartered as a women's college in 1975 and became co-educational in 1995.

== History ==
Aichi Shukutoku University was founded in 1975 as a women's college. The school became co-educational in 1995 on its 20th anniversary.
