= Nittai-ji =

Buddhist temple in Nagoya city

Kakuōzan Nittai-ji 覚王山日泰寺
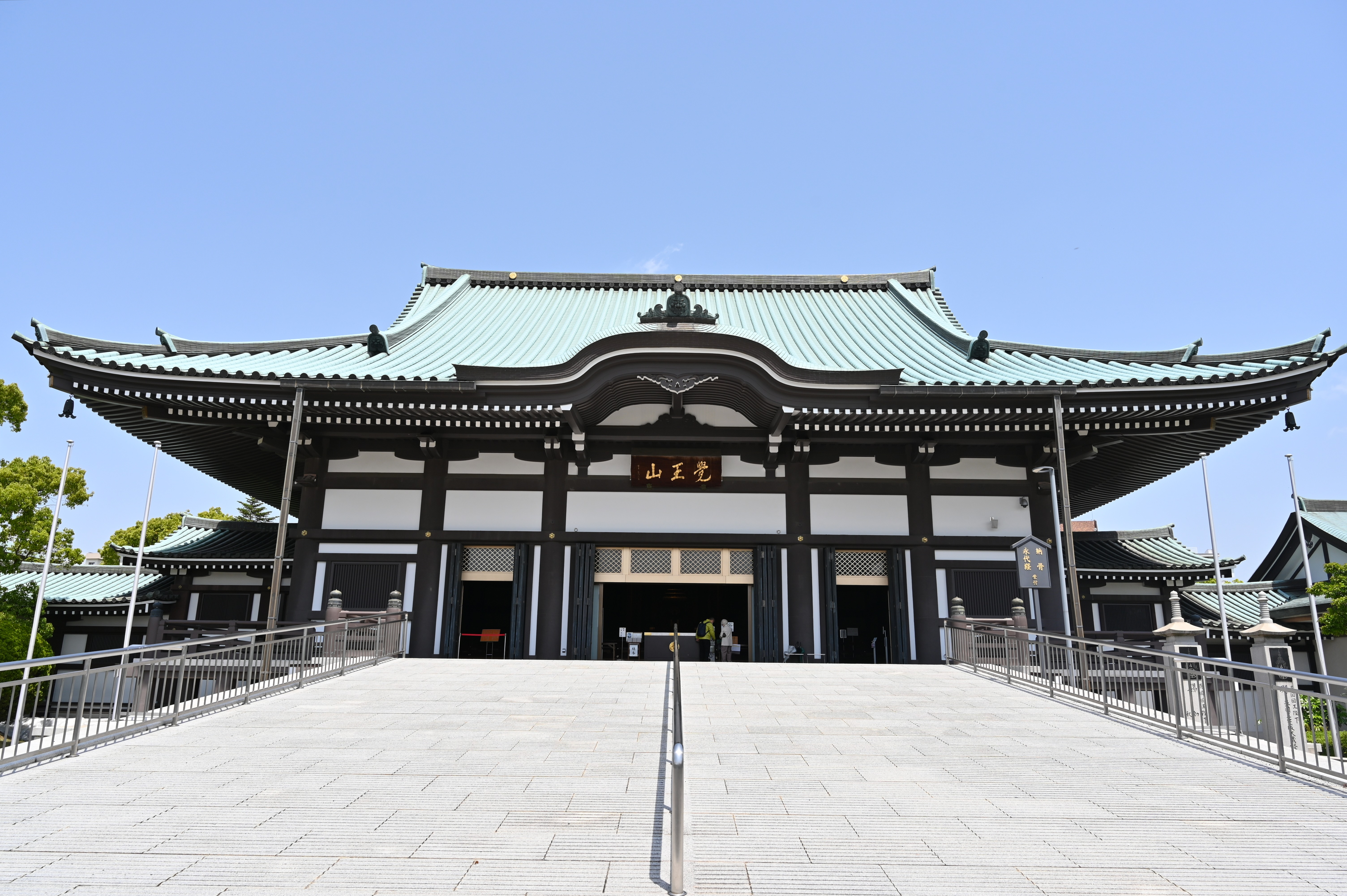
- Main Hall

Religion
- Affiliation: Eclectic
- Deity: Gold-bronze statue of Śākyamuni

Location
- Location: 1-1 Hōō-chō, Chikusa-ku, Nagoya, Aichi Prefecture
- Country: Japan
- Interactive map of Kakuōzan Nittai-ji 覚王山日泰寺
- Coordinates: 35°10′17.6″N 136°57′18.67″E

Architecture
- Completed: 1904

Website
- http://www.nittaiji.jp/index.html

Kakuōzan Nittai-ji (覚王山日泰寺, Japan-Thailand Temple) is a Buddhist temple located in the city of Nagoya, Aichi prefecture, Japan. It was built in 1904 in order to keep the ashes of Buddha, given to Japan by the Kingdom of Thailand. ”覚王” literally means "Enlightenment King," referring to the Buddha, and “日泰” means Japan and the Kingdom of Thailand in Japanese.

Usually, each temple in Japan belongs to a religious sect. However, Nittai-ji does not belong to any religious sect. Every three years, 19 religious sects take their turn to dispatch a chief priest to Nittai-ji. Usually, the ambassador of the Kingdom of Thailand visits Nittai-ji on his birthday.

== History ==
=== Discovery of the Buddha's relics ===
In January 1898, a resident officer from Britain, William Peppe, discovered a pot of soapstone containing human bones when he was excavating a tumulus near the border of Nepal at Piprahwa. Some ancient lettering written on the side of the pot are thought to be dated around the 3rd century B.C. The script reads, “The pot of the holy remains of Buddha is enshrined with a heart of trust by wife, children, brothers and sisters, together with a Sakya clan in India, Sakya”. This lends support for the historicity of a traditional belief expressed in Buddhist text, which claim that after the Buddha's death, he was cremated and the ashes of his remains were divided into eight portions. Some of the portion given to the Sakya clan was kept at Kapilavastu.

In the 19th century, many researchers believed the Buddha to be a product of legend. This discovery provided evidence for the Buddha as a historical person. The government of India decided to keep the pot in the Indian Museum in Kolkata and gave the ashes of the Buddha to the royal family of Thailand. King Chulalongkorn kept the ashes in Wat Saket and divided it into several portions as a gift to other Buddhist countries like Ceylon and Burma.

When the minister of Japan, Manjiro Inagaki, heard the news, he requested that the king offer a portion of ashes to Japan. The king granted his request and presented a portion of the relics to Japan as a gift from the royal family of Thailand to the Japanese people.

=== Founding Nittai-ji ===
Inagaki sent a letter about receiving the ashes of the Buddha to the foreign minister, Shuzo Aoki. Aoki immediately commanded all of the chiefs of Buddhist sects (13 sects and 56 sub sects) to prepare to receive the holy ashes. They held a conference and decided to receive the holy ashes.

In June 1900, a mission was organized in order to receive the holy ashes. The mission traveled to Thailand on June 15 of that year and received the holy ashes from King Chulalongkorn at the Grand Palace. They promised King Chulalongkorn to build a new temple not belonging to any Buddhist sect at which to enshrine the holy ashes. King Chulalongkorn also gave a one thousand year old gold-bronze statue of the Buddha, a national treasure in Thailand, to function as the main statue of the Buddha in the new temple.

The mission brought the holy ashes back to Japan and the holy ashes were temporarily kept at Myōhō-in temple in Kyoto. Representatives from each Buddhist sect in Japan conferred about the new temple that would keep the holy ashes. After many conferences, they decided to build the temple in Nagoya. The Nagoya city government prepared 330,000 square meters of land to build the temple. Finally, in 1904, Nissen-ji (now, Nittai-ji) was built in commemoration of the friendship between Japan and Thailand.

== Architecture ==
=== Stupa ===
The Stupa (奉安塔 Hōan-tō) is an important cultural property designated by Aichi Prefectural Government. The tower measures a height of 15m and is made of granite. It was designed by Professor Chuta Ito of Tokyo University and is modeled on the Gandhara style.

In front of the stupa, there is a round pathway for holding the celebratory annual ritual and circumambulation. The second story contains the Relic Hall (舍利殿 Shariden).

=== Main Hall ===
The main hall (本堂 Hondō) is the location of the gold-bronze statue of the Buddha. In front of this hall, there is a signature by the former king of Thailand, King Bhumibol Adulyadej, containing the phrase “Sakyamuni Buddha” written in the Thai language. On the west side, there is calligraphy written by Otei Kaneko, which expresses the good friendship between Japan and Thailand.

=== Other ===
- Worship Hall (礼拝殿 Reihai-den), built for prayer and adoration. It is built in front of the reliquary tower.
- Cemetery (墓地 Hakachi), with an area of 82500 square meters.
- Spirit hall (霊堂 Reido), 1984, one the first indoor cemeteries in Japan.
- The five-storied pagoda (五重塔 Goshūnotō), 1997, with a height of 30m.
- Phoenix Hall (鳳凰台 Hōō-dai), 1927, an important cultural property designated by the Nagoya City Government.
- Tea-ceremony Room (草結庵 Sōketsuan), Edo Period, an important cultural property designated by the Aichi Prefectural Government.

== Treasures ==
- Main Gate (山門 Sanmon)

At the main gate, there are two statues. On the right side of this gate, there is a statue of Ananda, a disciple of the Buddha who served him for his entire life. On the left side there is a statue of Mahākāśyapa, who was the oldest disciple of the Buddha and became a leader of the Sangha after the Buddha's passing.

- Chulalongkorn Statue (国王チュラロンコン像 Koku Churaronkon-zō)

This statue was built in 1987 in commemoration of the one hundred-year friendship between Japan and Thailand. It is placed in front of the Dharma hall. In front of the statue are flowers from Thailand (海江豆 Kaikōzu), planted by the Crown Prince of Thailand in 1987.

- Palm Leaf Manuscripts (所蔵の貝葉 Shozō no baiyō)

Palm leaves were once used among some circles as a medium for writing early Buddhist scripture. Nittai-ji has a collection of keeps 37 manuscripts, primarily in the Khmer and Thai language. Those manuscripts were given to Japan by Thailand but it is not known when this occurred.

The two statues were made by Katsuzo Entsuba in 1988.

- The holy ashes of the Buddha (仏舎利 Busshari), given to Japan by Thailand in 1900.
- Gold-bronze statue of Buddha (釈迦金銅仏 Shakakondōbutsu), given to Japan by Thailand in 1900.
- Framed calligraphy (扁額 Hengaku), by Etai Yamada. It reads "Turning of the Wheel of Dharma" (転法輪 Tempōrin; Sanskrit: Dharmacakrapravartana).
- Footprint of the Buddha (仏足石 Bussokuseki), made of bronze. Given by King Chulalongkorn to Japan in 1900.

== Major events ==
On the 21st day of every month, this temple holds a fair in celebration of Kobo Daishi and many shops open in front of the temple. This temple has some annual events.

- March 15: Nirvana Day.
- April 8: Buddha's Birthday (Flower festival)
- May: Vesak Festival
- June 15: Memorial ceremony for enshrinement of the Buddha's relics
- November 15: Memorial ceremony for the temple's opening
- December 8: Bodhi Day

== Gallery ==
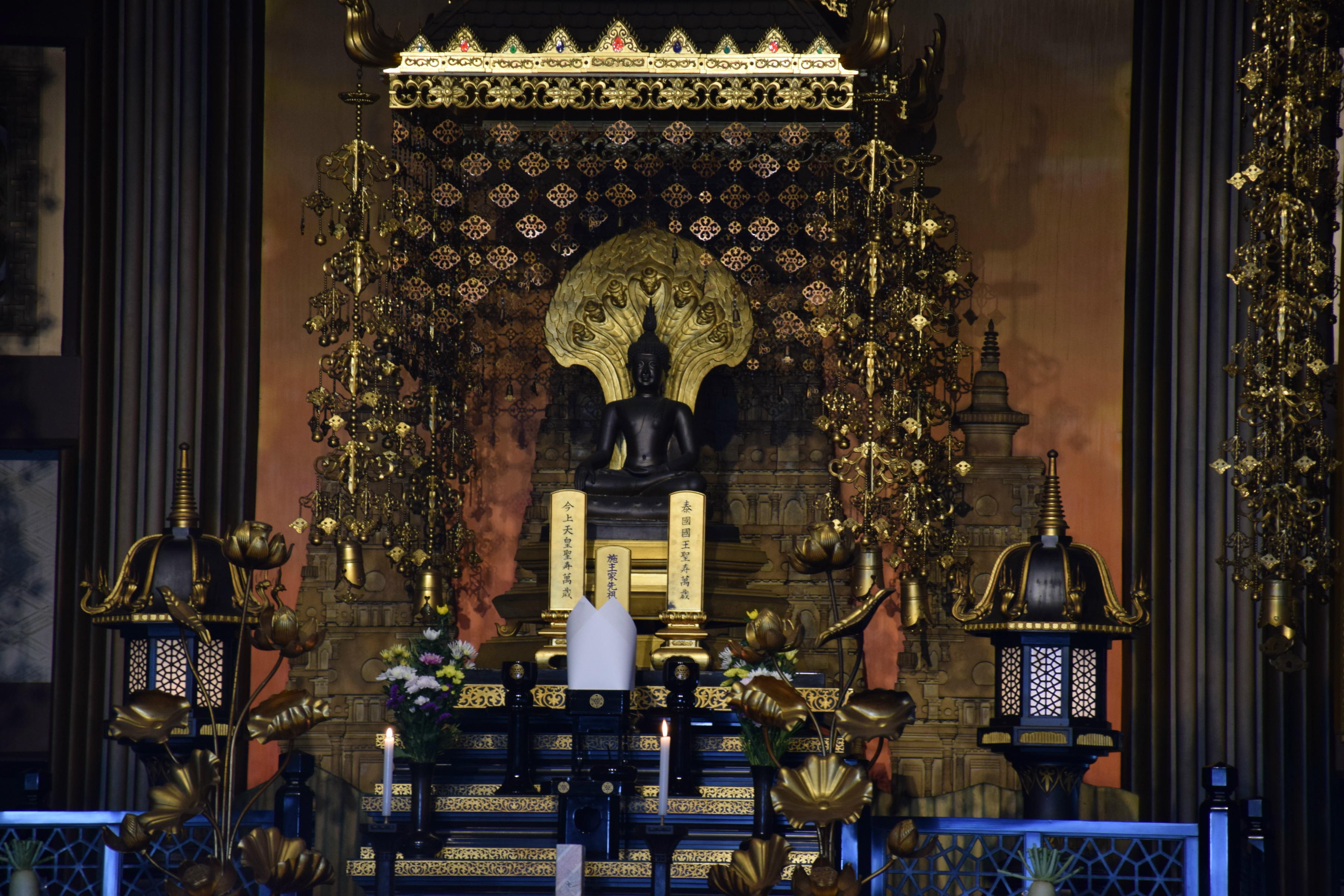
Gold-Bronze Statue of Buddha

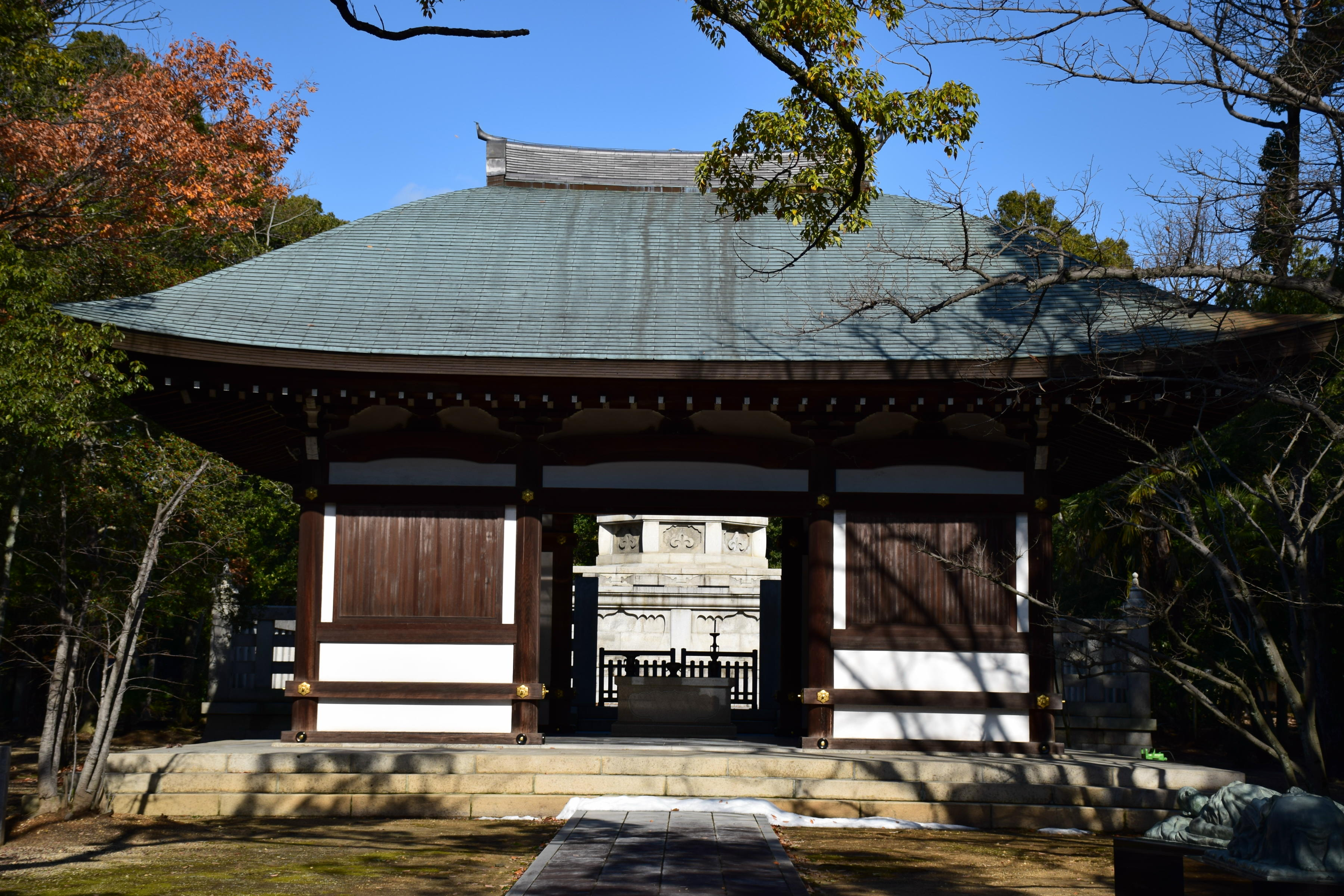
Reliquary hall (Shariden) in front of Tower keeping ashes

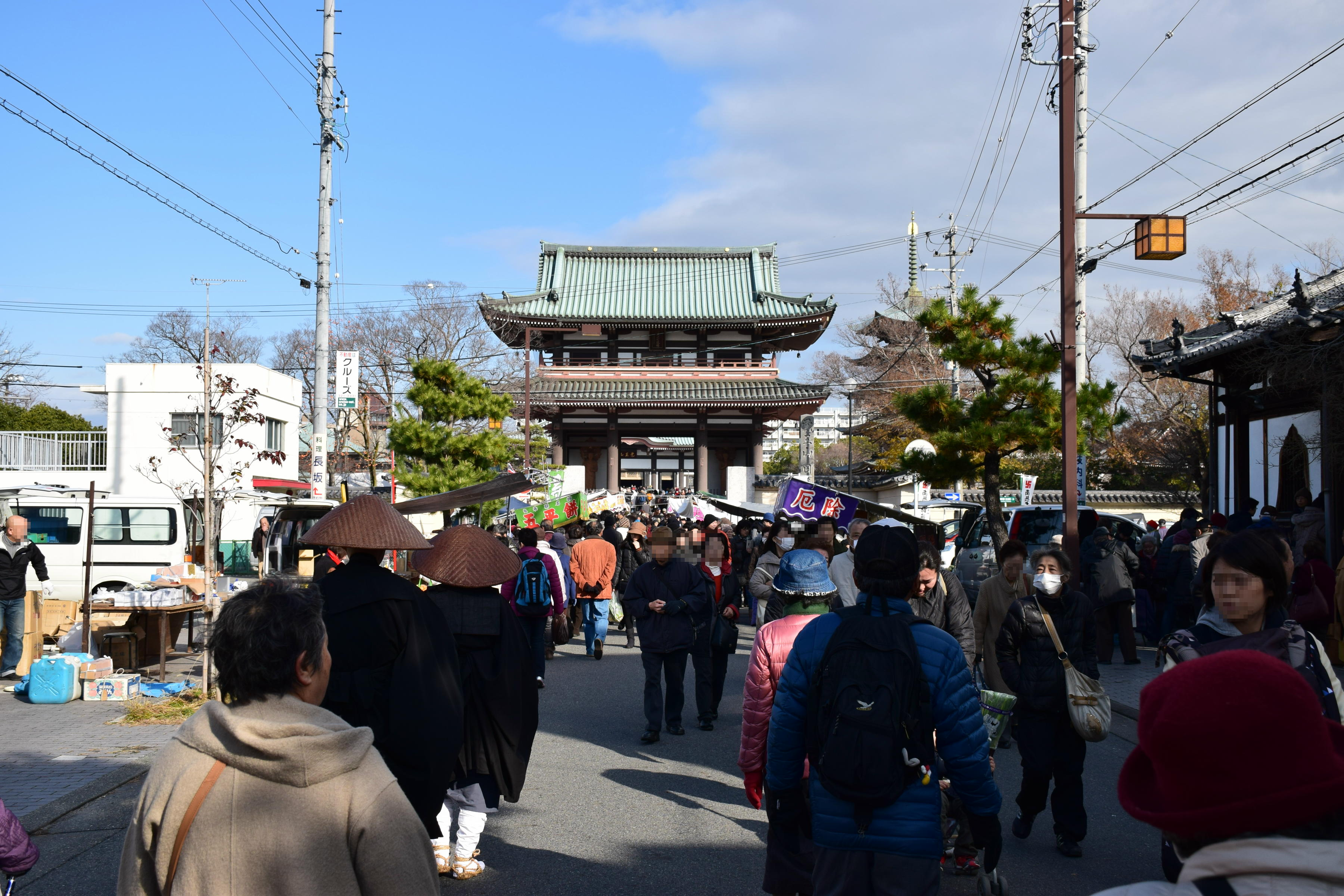
Main Gate

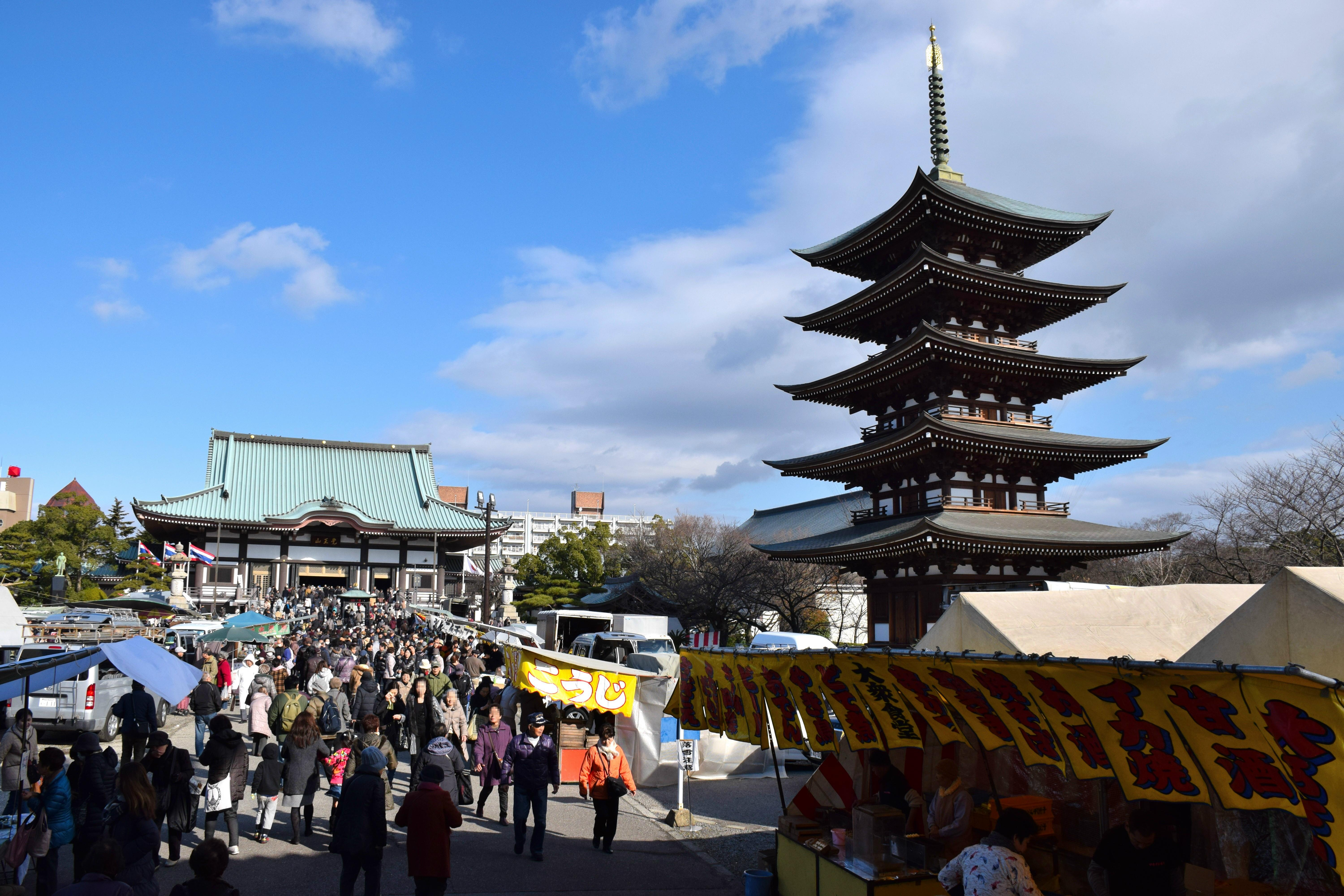
Main gate and the five-storied pagoda

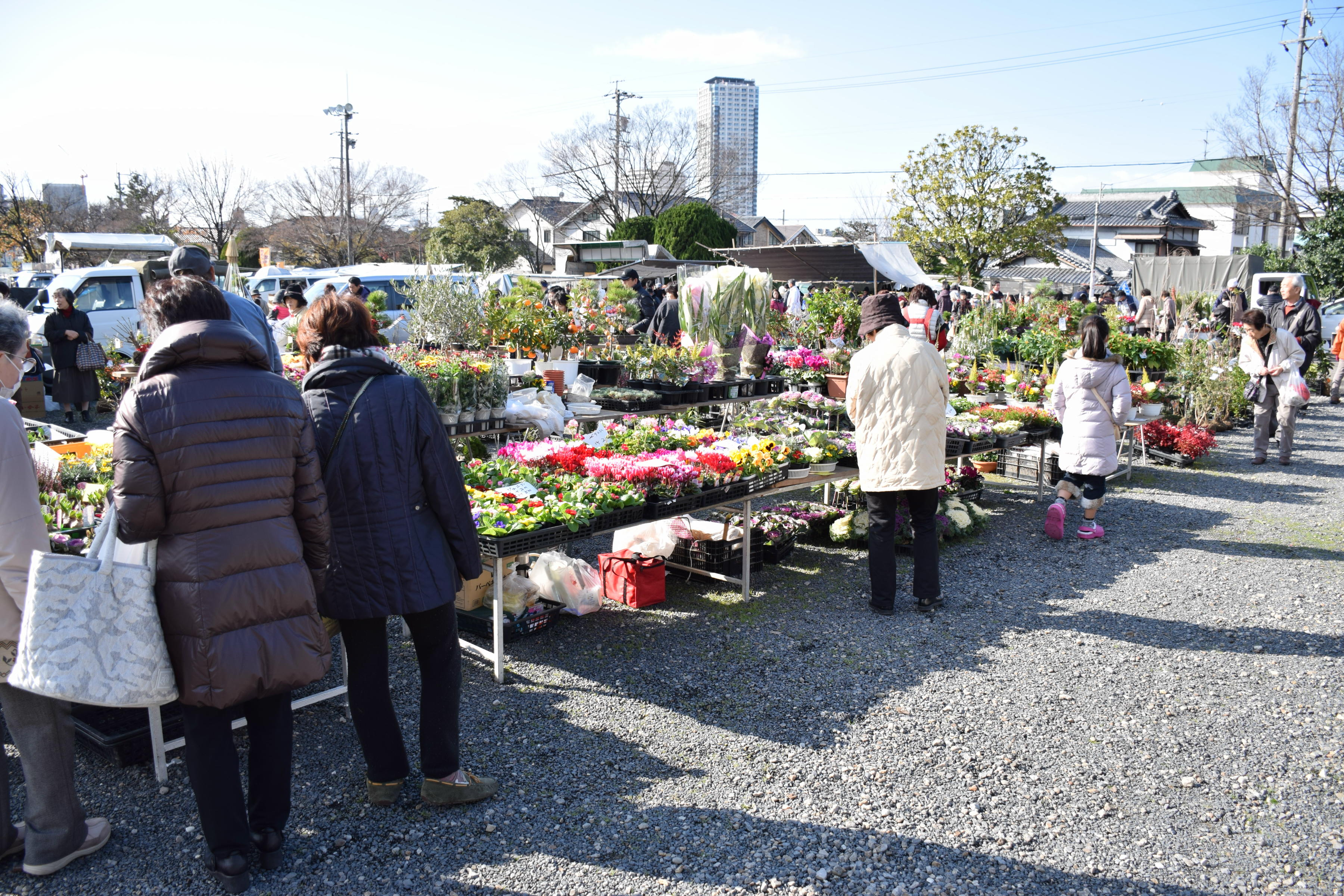
Flower market in front of the temple
