= Chikusa-ku =

Chikusa 千種区
- Ward
- Chikusa Ward
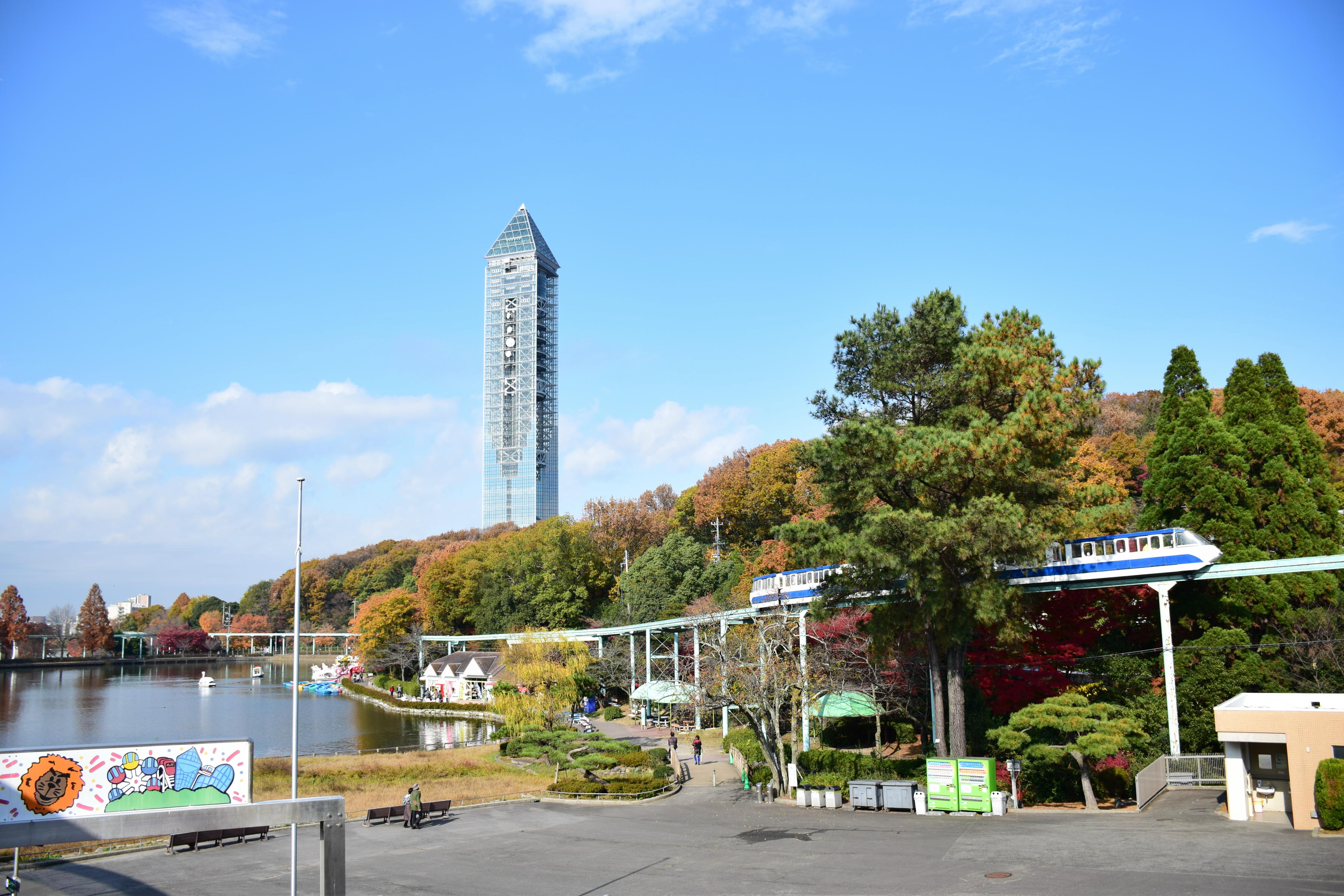
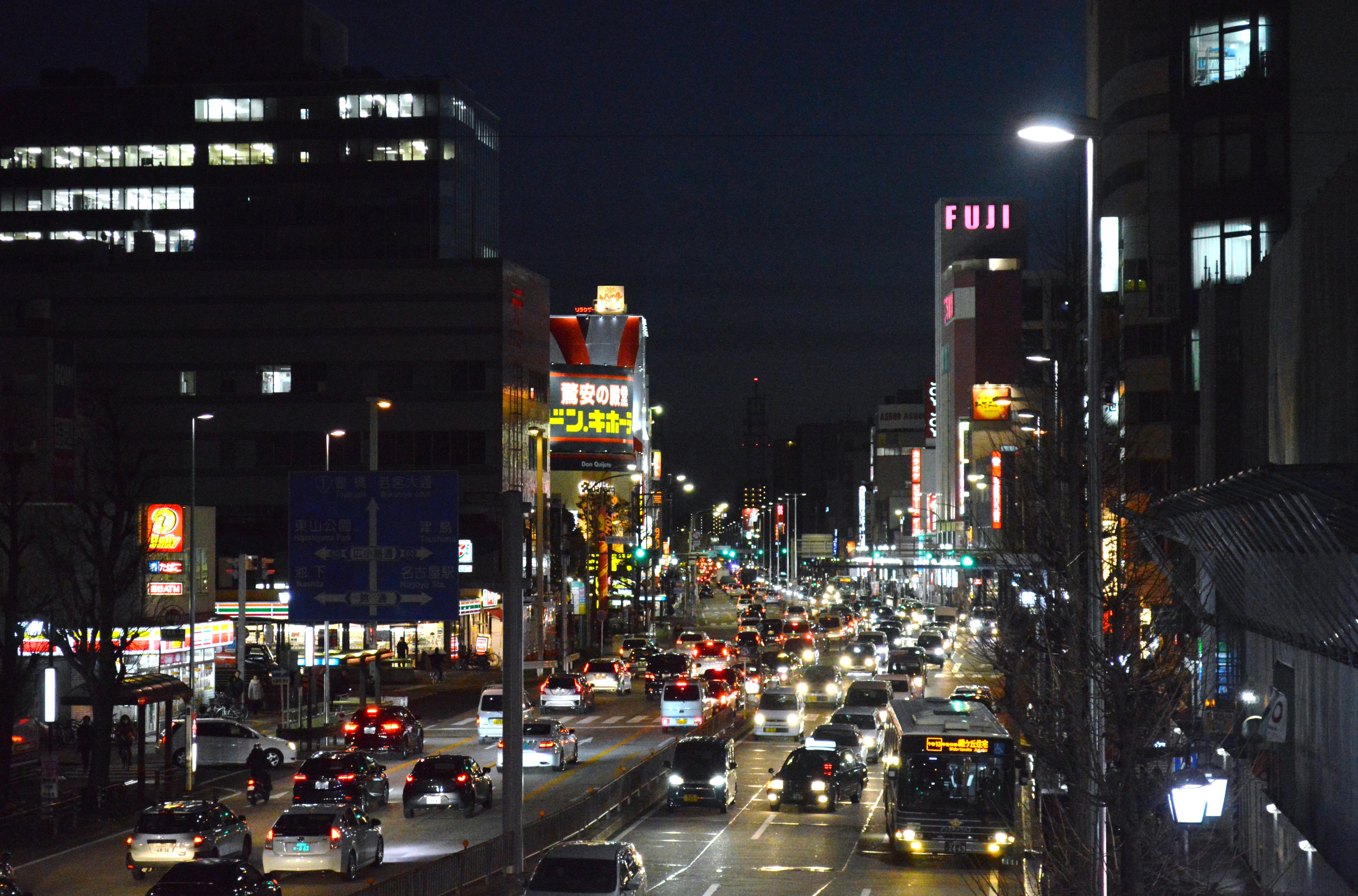
- Higashiyama Zoo and Botanical Gardens; Imaike night view

- Flag Seal

- Location of Chikusa-ku in Nagoya

- Coordinates: 35°10′12″N 136°58′01″E
- Country: Japan
- Region: Tōkai region Chūbu region
- Prefecture: Aichi

Area
  - Total: 18.18 km^{2} (7.02 sq mi)

Population (October 1, 2019)
  - Total: 165,863
  - Density: 9,123/km^{2} (23,630/sq mi)
- Time zone: UTC+9 (Japan Standard Time)
- Tree: Flowering Dogwood
- Flower: Hydrangea
- Phone number: 052-762-3111
- Address: 8-37 Kakuōzan-dōri, Chikusa-ku, Nagoya-shi, Aichi-ken 464-8644
- Website: www.city.nagoya.jp/chikusa/ (in Japanese)

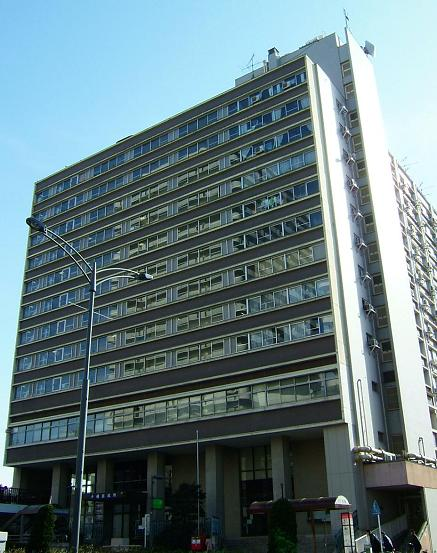
Chikusa-ku Ward Office

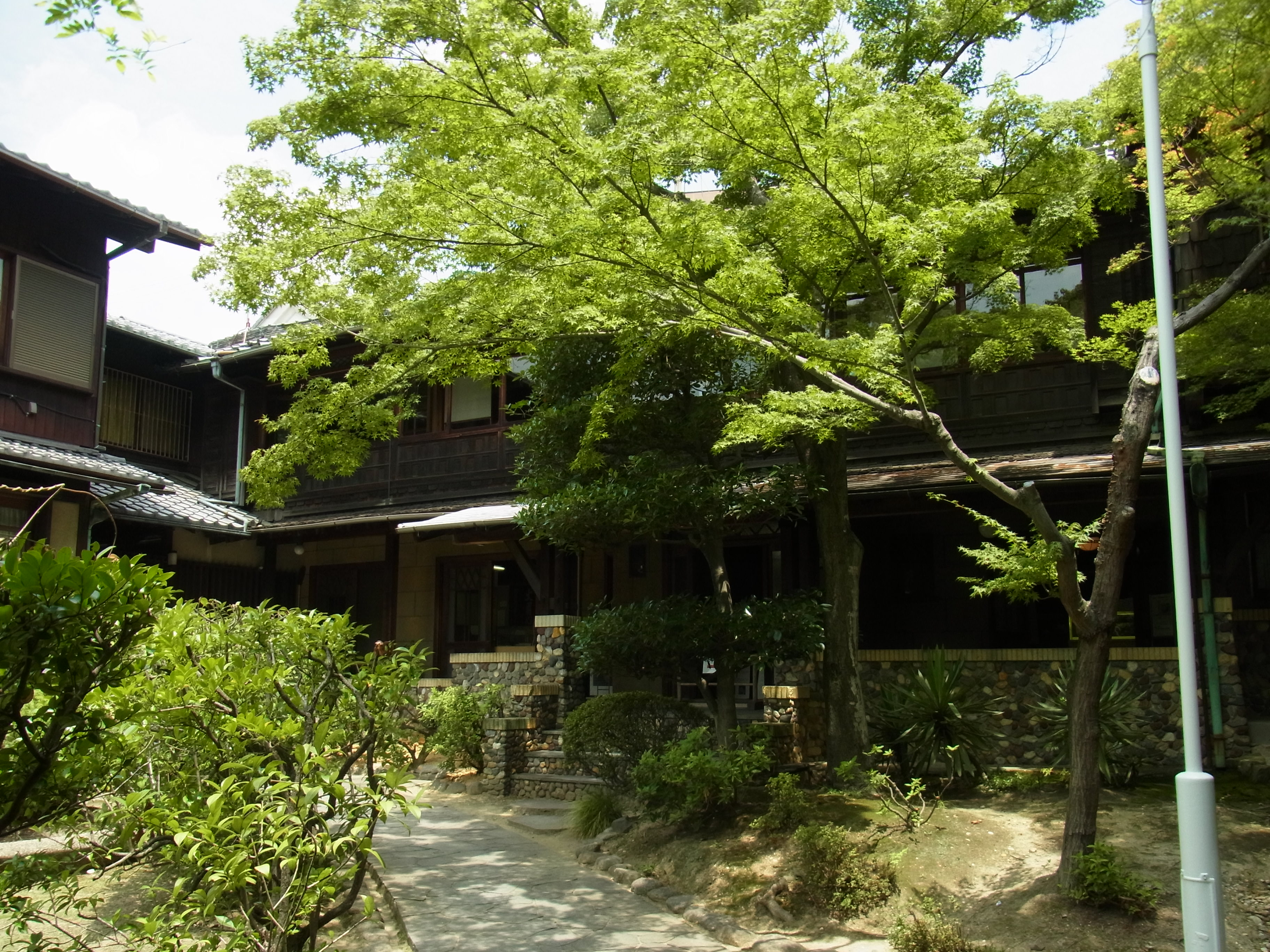
Yōki-sō villa

Chikusa (千種区, Chikusa-ku) is one of the 16 wards of the city of Nagoya in Aichi Prefecture, Japan. As of 1 October 2019, the ward had an estimated population of 165,863 and a population density of 9,123 persons per km^{2}. The total area was 18.18 km^{2}.

== Geography ==
Chikusa Ward is located in northeastern Nagoya city.

=== Surrounding municipalities ===
- Naka Ward
- Higashi Ward
- Moriyama Ward
- Meitō Ward
- Tenpaku Ward
- Shōwa Ward

== History ==
The town of Chikusa and the village of Higashiyama in Aichi District were annexed by the city of Nagoya on August 22, 1921, becoming part of Higashi Ward. Chikusa Ward was established in 1937. On April 5, 1955, the neighboring village of Idaka was merged into Chikusa Ward.

== Education ==
- Nagoya University
- Nagoya City University – Kita-Chikusa Campus
- Sugiyama Jogakuen University
- Aichi Gakuin University – Chikusa Campus
- Aichi Shukutoku University – Chikusa Campus
- Aichi Institute of Technology – Chikusa Campus

== Transportation ==
=== Rail ===
- JR Central – Chūō Main Line
  - Chikusa
- Nagoya Municipal Subway – Higashiyama Line
  - Imaike - Ikeshita - Kakuōzan - Motoyama - Higashiyama Kōen - Hoshigaoka
- Nagoya Municipal Subway – Sakura-dōri Line
  - Imaike -Fukiage
- Nagoya Municipal Subway – Meijō Line
  - Chayagasaka - Jiyūgaoka - Motoyama - Nagoya Daigaku

=== Highways ===
- Route 2 (Nagoya Expressway)
- Japan National Route 153

== Local attractions ==
- Nagoya University Museum
- Furukawa Air Museum
- Heiwa Park
- Higashiyama Sky Tower
- Higashiyama Zoo and Botanical Gardens
- Shiroyama Hachimangū
- Tōgan-ji
- Nittai-ji
- Yōki-sō villa and garden

== Noted people ==
- Masahiro Andoh – musician
- Miki Ando – professional figure skater
- Yasutaro Koide – supercentenarian
- Yukihiko Tsutsumi – television and film director
- Keiko Toda – voice actress
