= Nagoya =

Designated city in Aichi, Chūbu, Japan

Nagoya 名古屋市
- Prefecture capital and Designated city
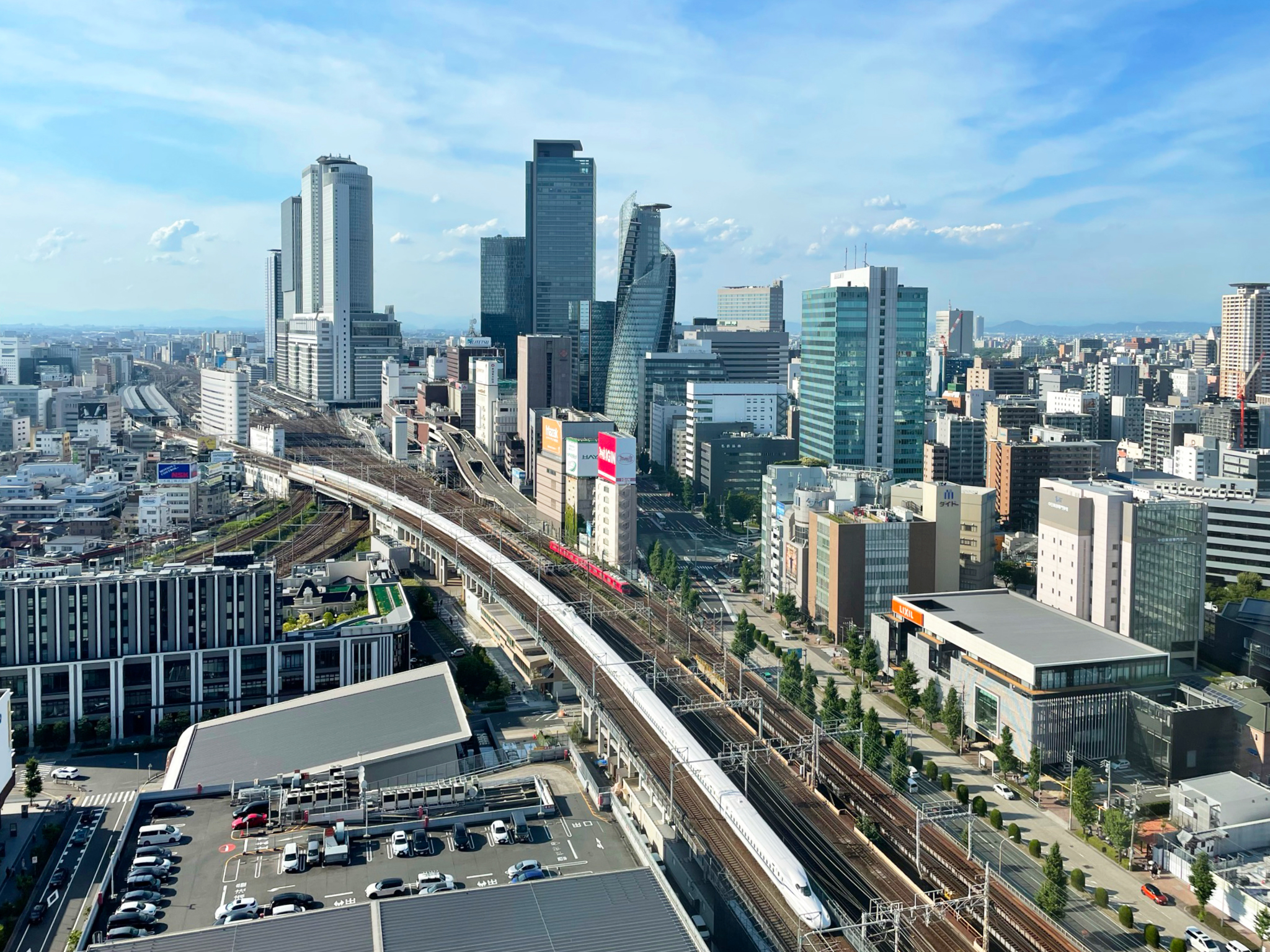
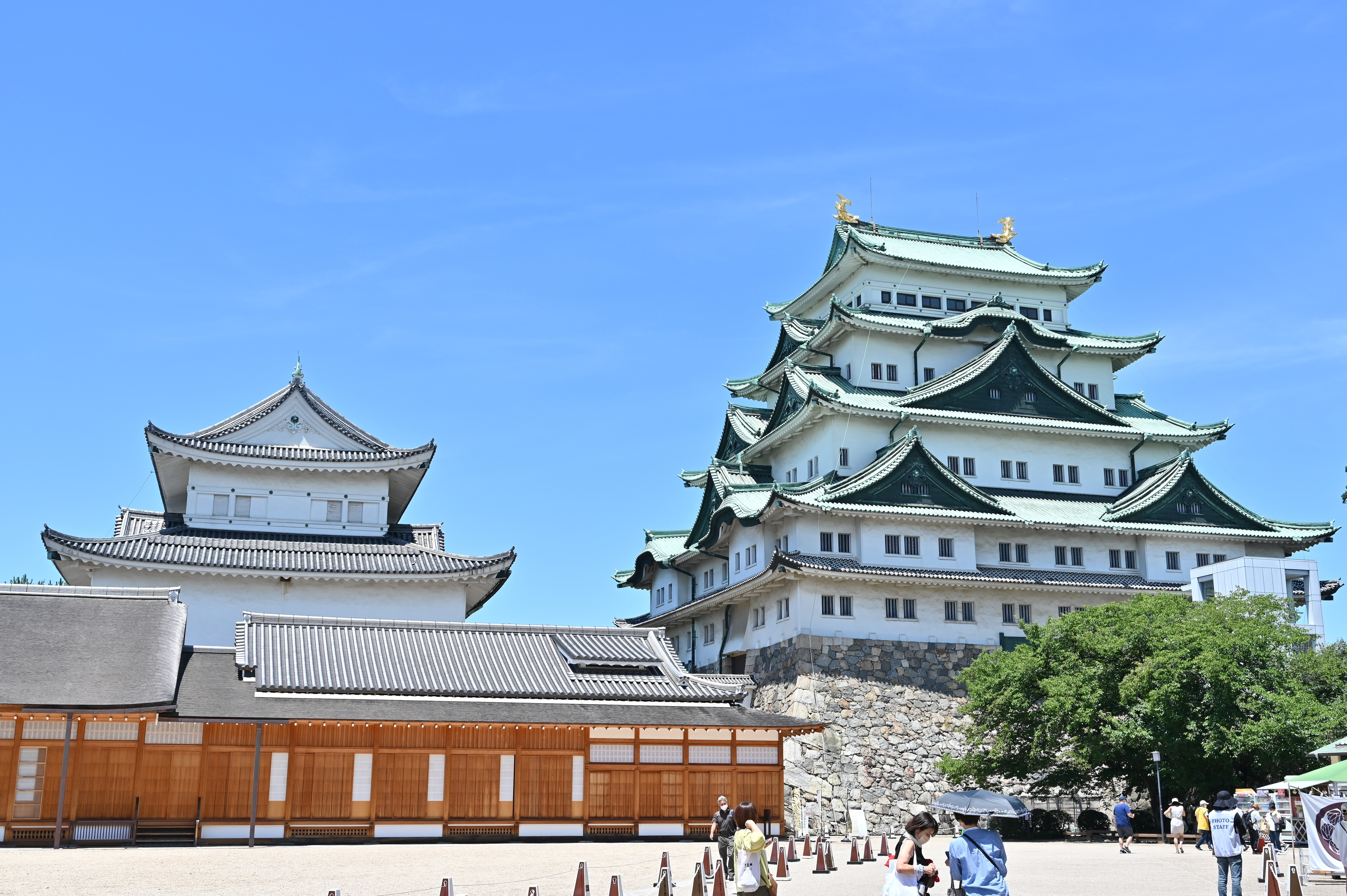
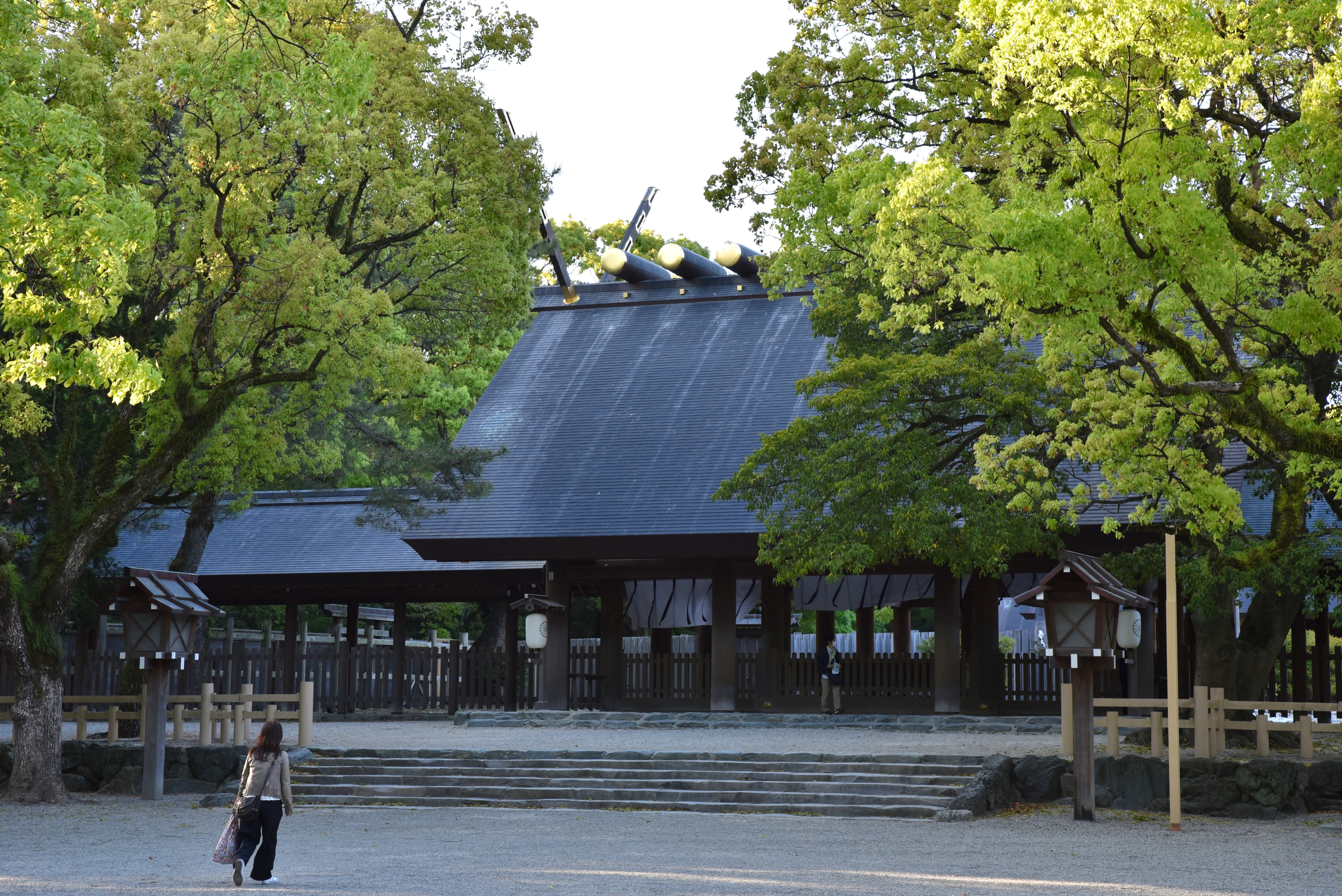
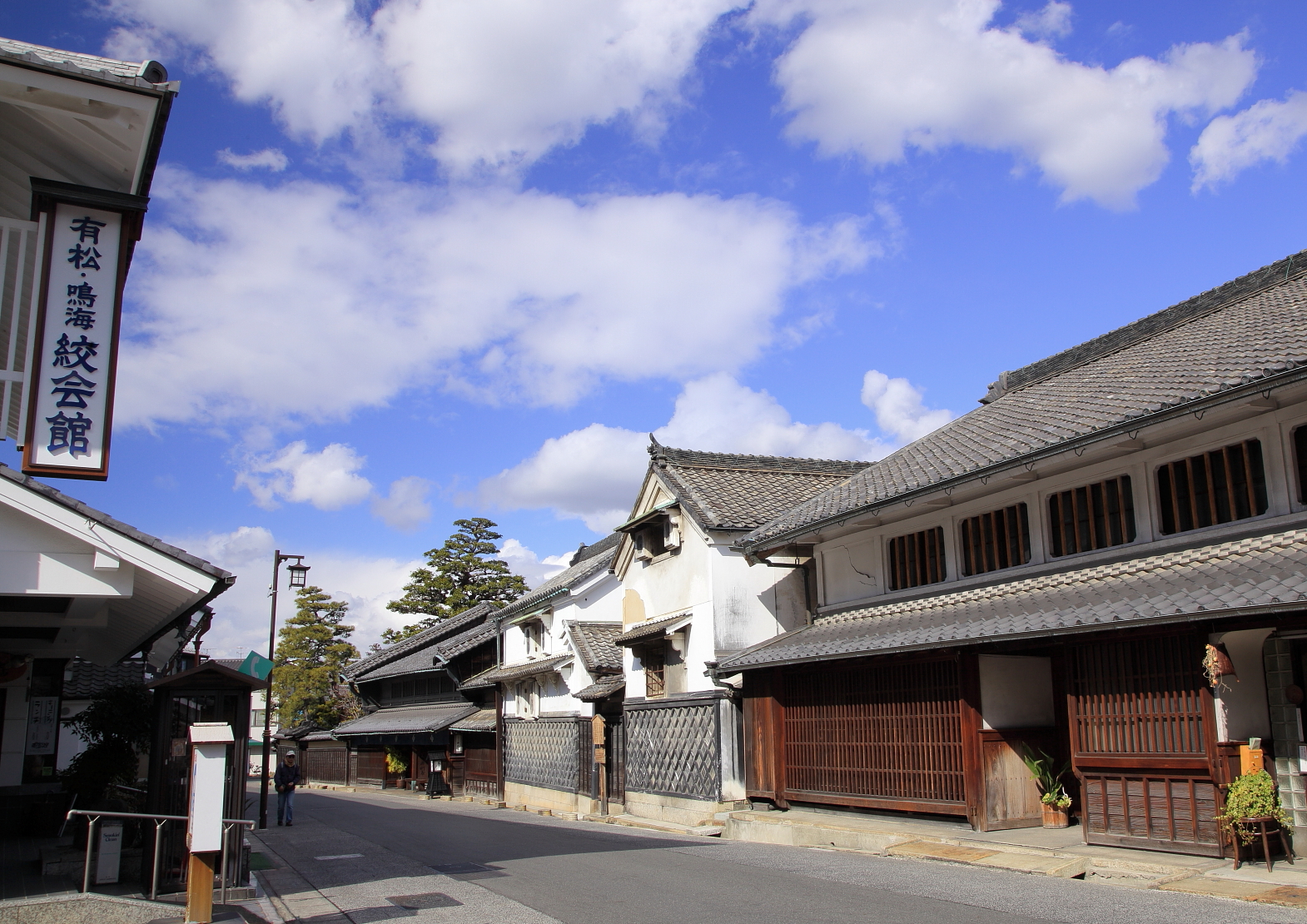
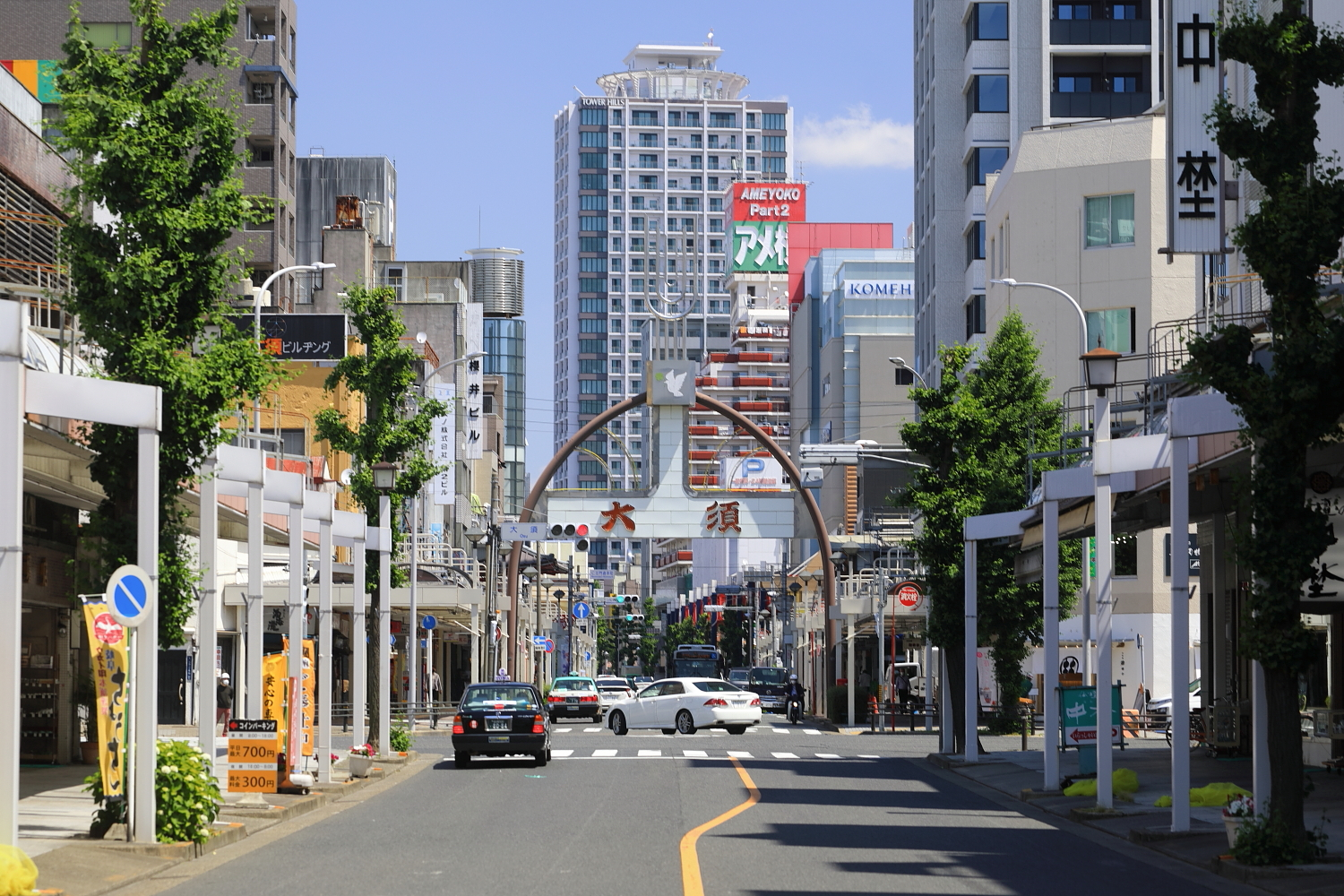
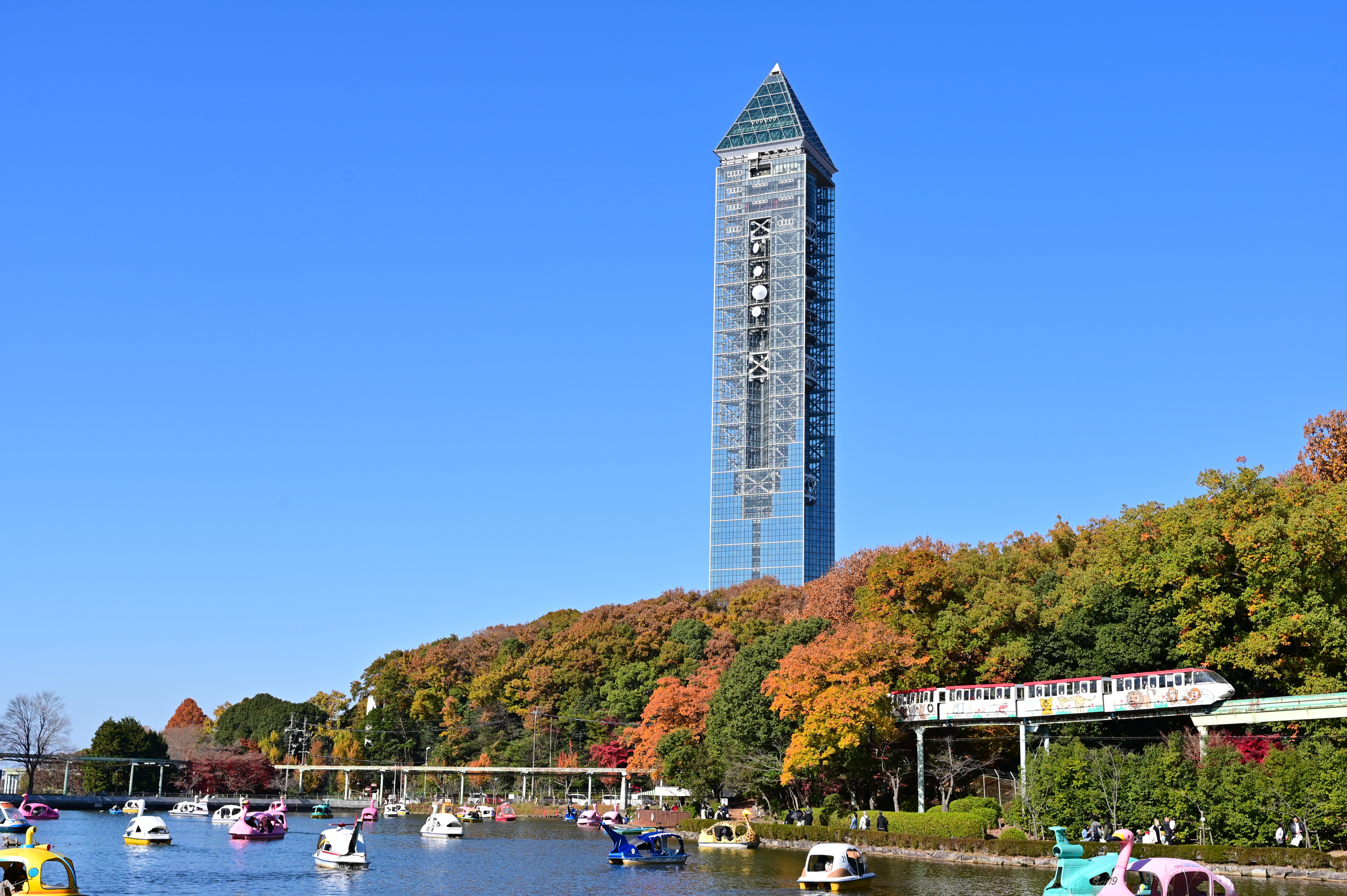
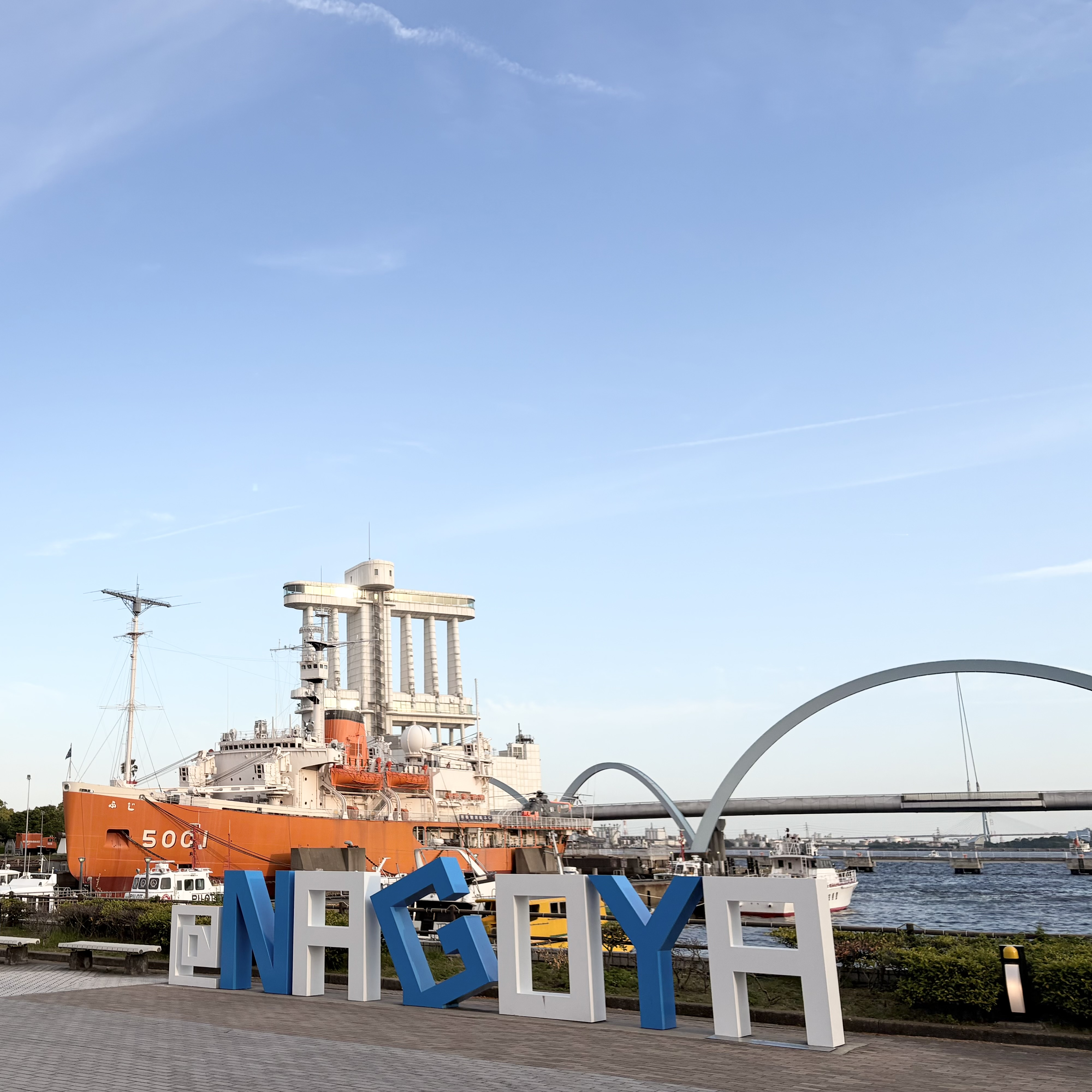
- Skyline of Nagoya Nagoya Castle Nagoya TV Tower in Sakae Atsuta Shrine Arimatsu Ōsu Higashiyama Zoo and Botanical Gardens Nagoya Port

- Flag Seal
- Nickname: Chūkyō (中京)
- Interactive map outlining Nagoya
- Location of Nagoya in Aichi Prefecture

- Location within Aichi Prefecture Location within Chubu region Location within Japan
- Coordinates: 35°11′N 136°54′E
- Country: Japan
- Region: Chūbu (Tōkai)
- Prefecture: Aichi Prefecture
- First official recorded: 199 AD
- City Settled: 1 November 1889

Government
  - Mayor: Ichiro Hirosawa (since 25 November 2024) (Genzei Nippon)
  - Representatives: 5

Area
  - Prefecture capital and Designated city: 326.45 km^{2} (126.04 sq mi)

Population (1 September 2025)
  - Prefecture capital and Designated city: 2,337,864 (4th)
  - Density: 7,161.5/km^{2} (18,548/sq mi)
  - Metro: 10,240,000 (3rd)
- Demonym: Nagoyan
- Time zone: UTC+09:00 (Japan Standard Time)
  - Tree: Camphor laurel (Cinnamomum camphora)
  - Flower: Lilium
- Phone number: 052-972-2017
- Address: 3-1-1 Sannomaru, Naka-ku, Nagoya-shi, Aichi-ken 460-0001
- Website: www.city.nagoya.jp

Nagoya
- "Nagoya" in kanji

Japanese name
- Kanji: 名古屋
- Hiragana: なごや
- Katakana: ナゴヤ
Transcriptions
- Romanization: Nagoya

Nagoya (名古屋市, Nagoya-shi; English: /nə.ˈɡɔɪ.ə/; Japanese: [nä́.ɡò̞.jä̀, -ŋò̞.jä̀, nä̀.ɡó̞.jä́.ɕì, -ŋó̞.jä́-]) is the capital and most populous city of Aichi Prefecture in Japan. It is the largest city in the Chūbu region, the fourth-most populous city in Japan (with a 2025 population of 2.3 million), and the principal city of the Chūkyō metropolitan area, which is itself the third-most populous metropolitan area in Japan (with a population of 10.11 million). Nagoya is located on the Pacific coast in central Honshu, and its seaport is the largest in Japan.

In 1610, the shogun Tokugawa Ieyasu moved the capital of Owari Province from Kiyosu to Nagoya. This period saw the renovation of Nagoya Castle. The early 1900s brought a convergence of economic factors that fueled rapid growth in the city during the Meiji Restoration, and it became a major industrial hub for the country as the area's automobile, aviation, and shipbuilding industries flourished; the traditional manufacturing of bicycles, sewing machines, and timepieces was thus followed by the production of ceramic, chemicals, oil, petrochemicals, and steel. These factors made Nagoya a target of American air raids during the Pacific War.

Nagoya's economy diversified following the war, but the city remains a significant centre of industry and transport in Japan. It is linked to Tokyo, Osaka, and Kyoto by the Tokaido Shinkansen and is home to the Nagoya Stock Exchange, as well as the headquarters of Brother Industries, Ibanez, Lexus, and Toyota Tsusho, among others. It hosts educational institutes such as Nagoya University, the Nagoya Institute of Technology, and Nagoya City University. Famous landmarks include Atsuta Shrine, Higashiyama Zoo and Botanical Gardens, Hisaya Ōdori Park, Nagoya Castle, Port of Nagoya Public Aquarium, and Nagoya TV Tower. Nagoya is hosting the 2026 Asian Games, making it the third Japanese city to do so after Tokyo in 1958 and Hiroshima in 1994.

== Toponymy ==
The city's name was historically written as 那古野 or 名護屋 (both read as Nagoya). One possible origin is the adjective nagoyaka (和やか), meaning 'calm'.

The name Chūkyō (中京), consisting of chū (middle) + kyō (capital) is also used to refer to Nagoya. Notable examples of the use of the name Chūkyō include the Chūkyō Industrial Area, Chūkyō Metropolitan Area, Chūkyō Television Broadcasting, Chukyo University and the Chukyo Racecourse.

== History ==
=== Origins ===
Jōmon period & Kofun period

In the Jomon and Yayoi period, the Ōguruwa Shell Midden was discovered before the settlement of Nagoya. In the Kofun period, Nagoya was settled and the Danpusan Kofun and Shiratori Kofun was built in this area. The Atsuta Shrine is of ancient origin, it is home to the Imperial Regalia of Japan, the legendary sword Kusanagi no Tsurugi. According to traditional sources, Yamato Takeru died in 113 AD. The possessions of the dead prince were gathered together along with the sword Kusanagi and his widow venerated his memory in a shrine at her home.

The Origins of Nagoya

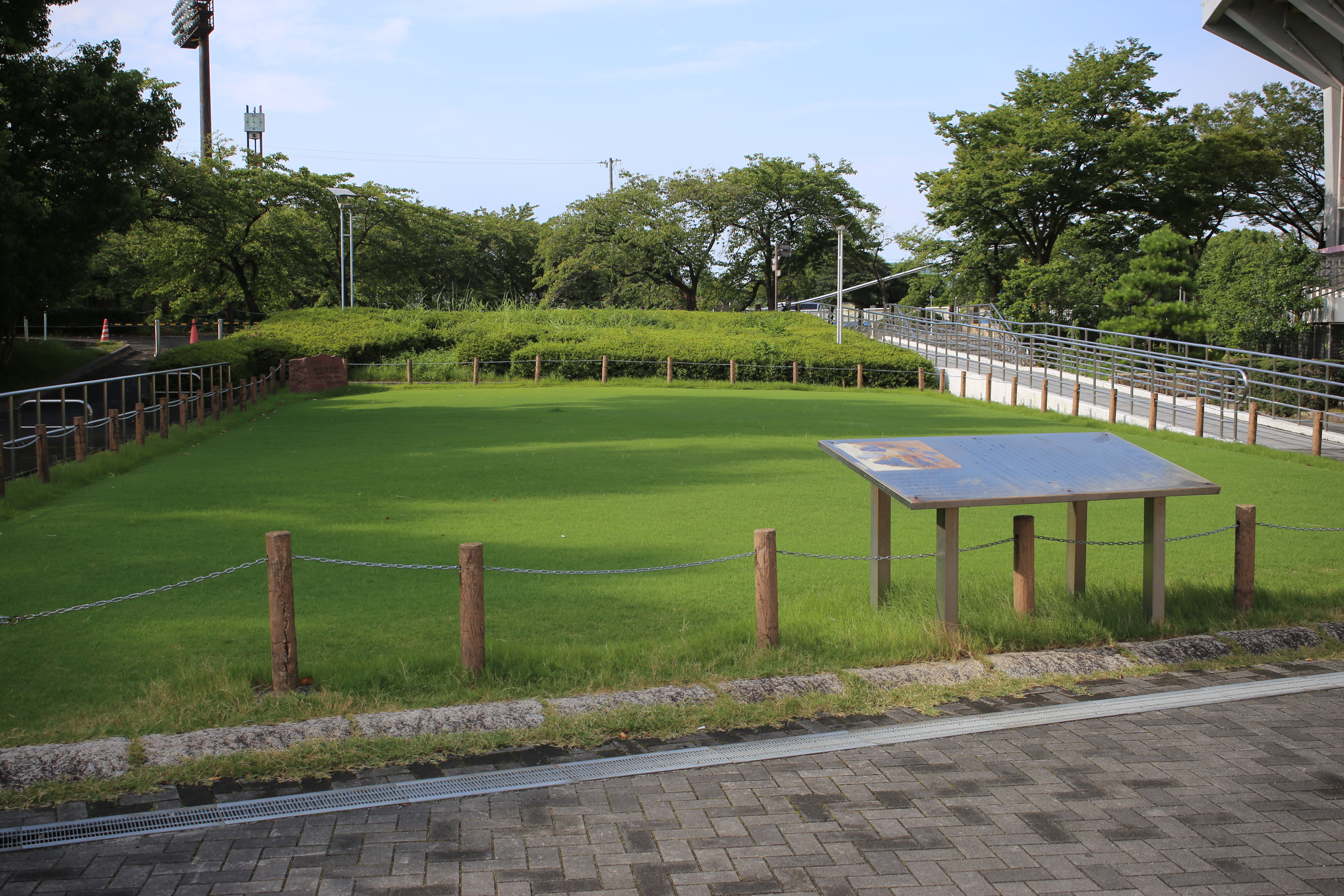
The Ōguruwa Shell Midden was discovered before the settlement.

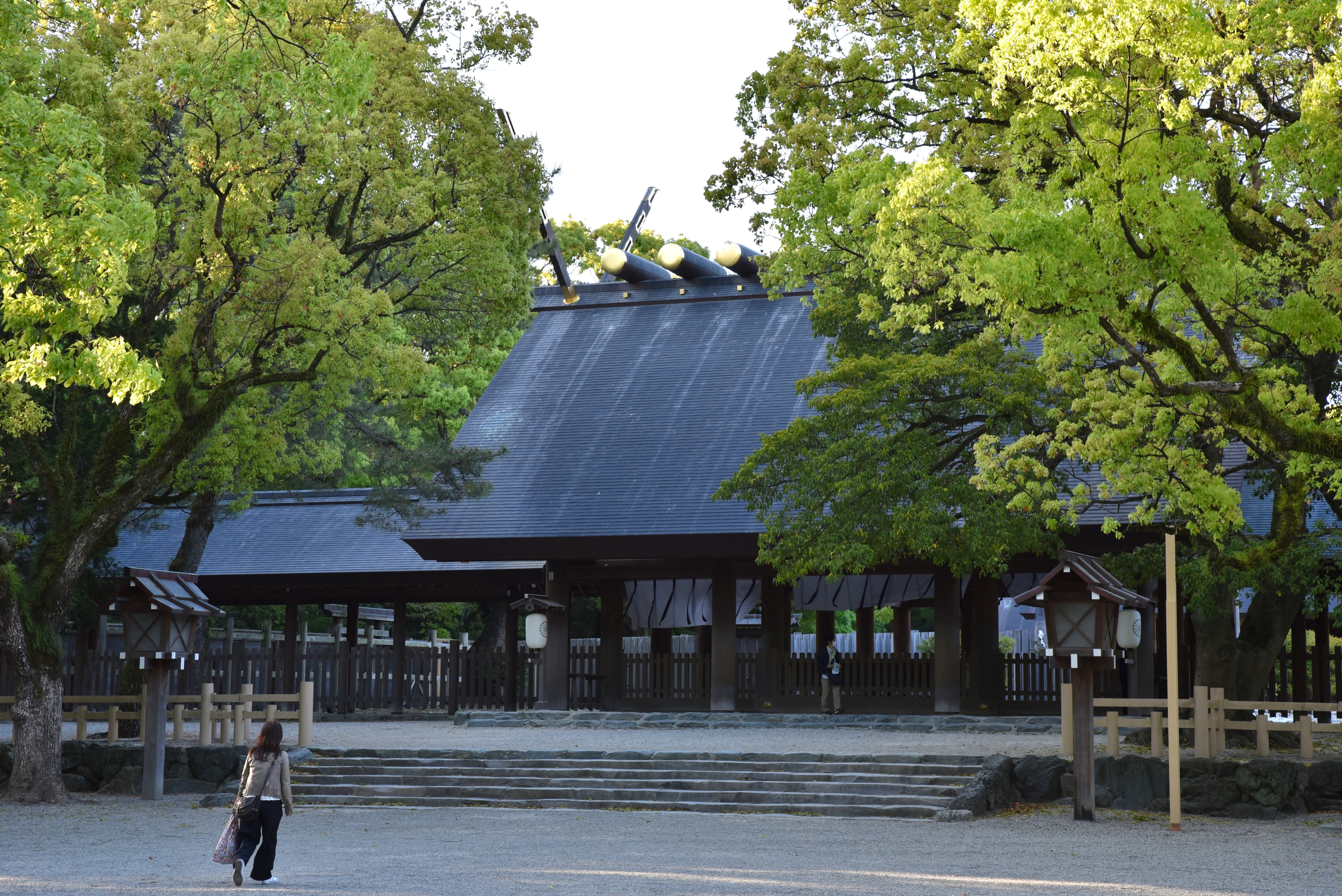
The Atsuta Shrine, which dates back to c. 100 AD and houses the holy sword Kusanagi, one of the Imperial Regalia of Japan

Heian period

The Seigan-ji was built by the Fujiwara clan in the late Heian period. A member served as the head priest of the nearby Atsuta Shrine, one of the legendary shrines of Japan. It is believed that Yura-Gozen, also known as Urahime, a daughter of Fujiwara no Suenori, was married to Minamoto no Yoshitomo (1123–60) and their son Minamoto no Yoritomo's birthplace is Nagoya, he is also the founder of the Kamakura shogunate.

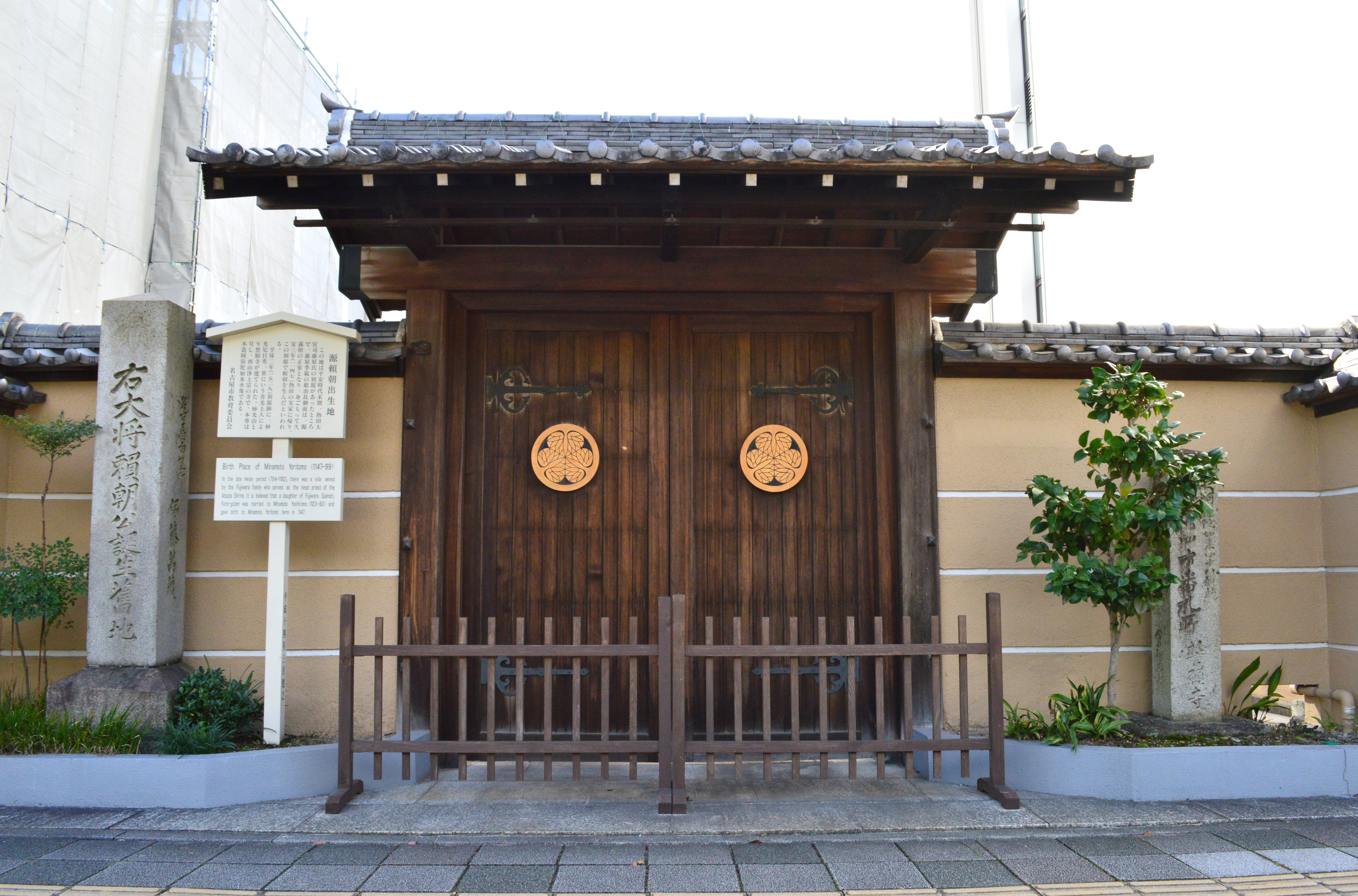
The Seigan-ji former family villa was the birthplace of Minamoto no Yoritomo, founder of the Kamakura Shogunate.

=== Feudal period ===
Azuchi–Momoyama period

Oda Nobunaga and his protégés Toyotomi Hideyoshi and Tokugawa Ieyasu were powerful warlords based in the Nagoya area who gradually succeeded in unifying Japan. In 1610, Tokugawa Ieyasu moved the capital of Owari Province from Kiyosu, about seven kilometres (4 1/2 miles) away, to a more strategic location in present-day Nagoya.

In May–June 1560, the Battle of Okehazama took place in Dengakuhazama, Owari Province which was just outside of what would become Nagoya city. In this battle, Oda Nobunaga defeated Imagawa Yoshimoto and established himself as one of the leading warlords in the Sengoku period.

Historical Figures of Nagoya

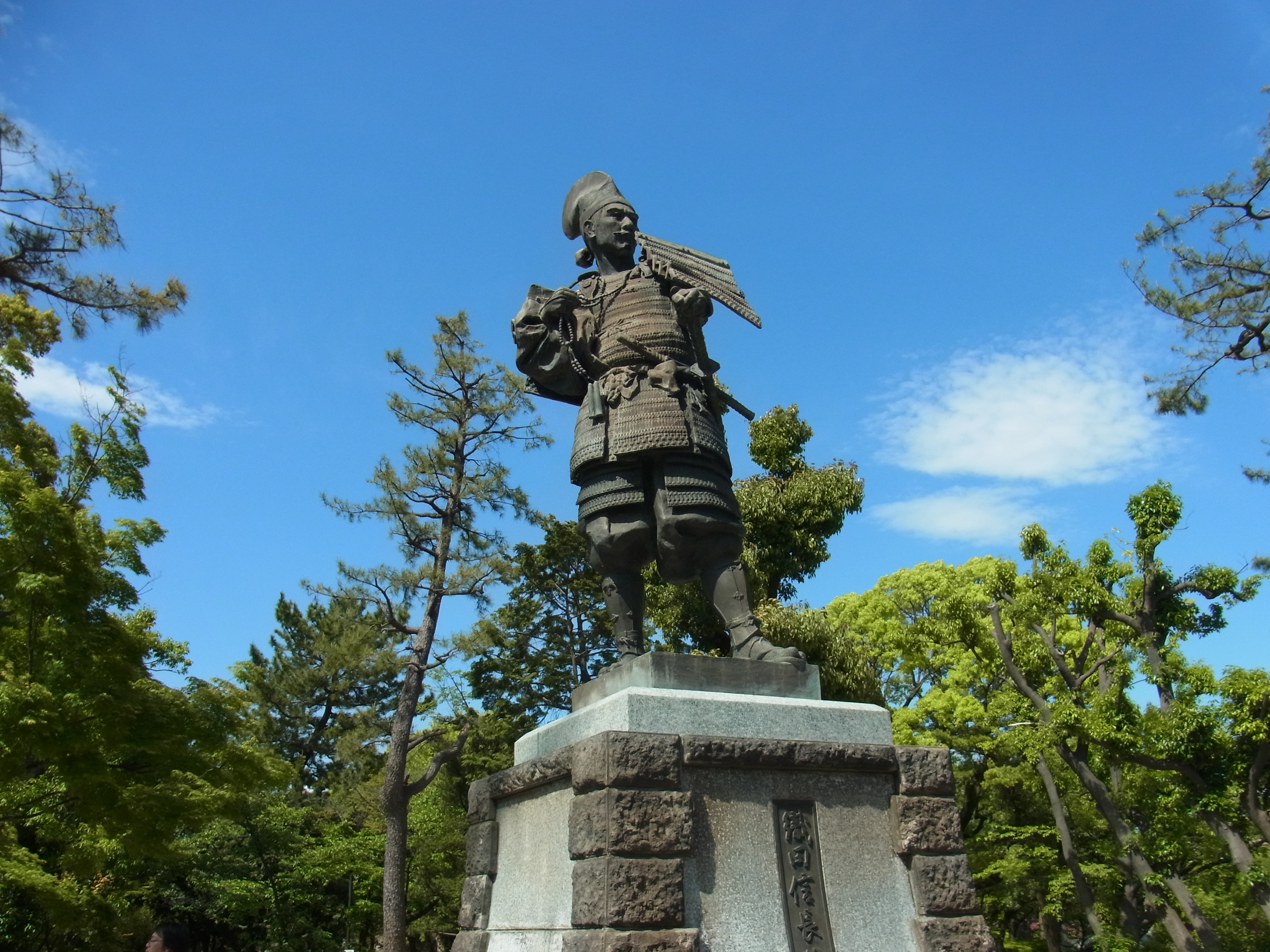
Oda Nobunaga

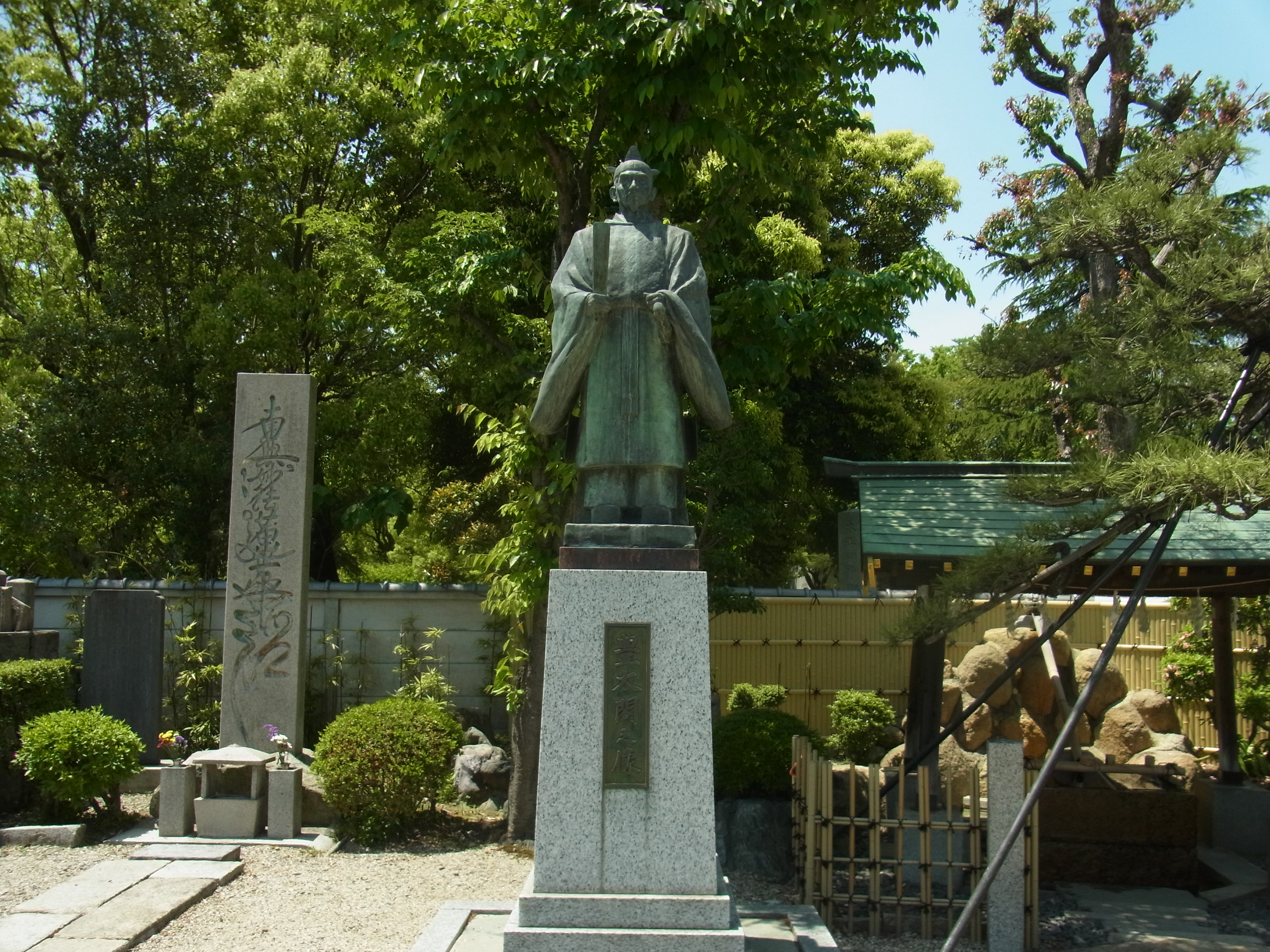
Toyotomi Hideyoshi

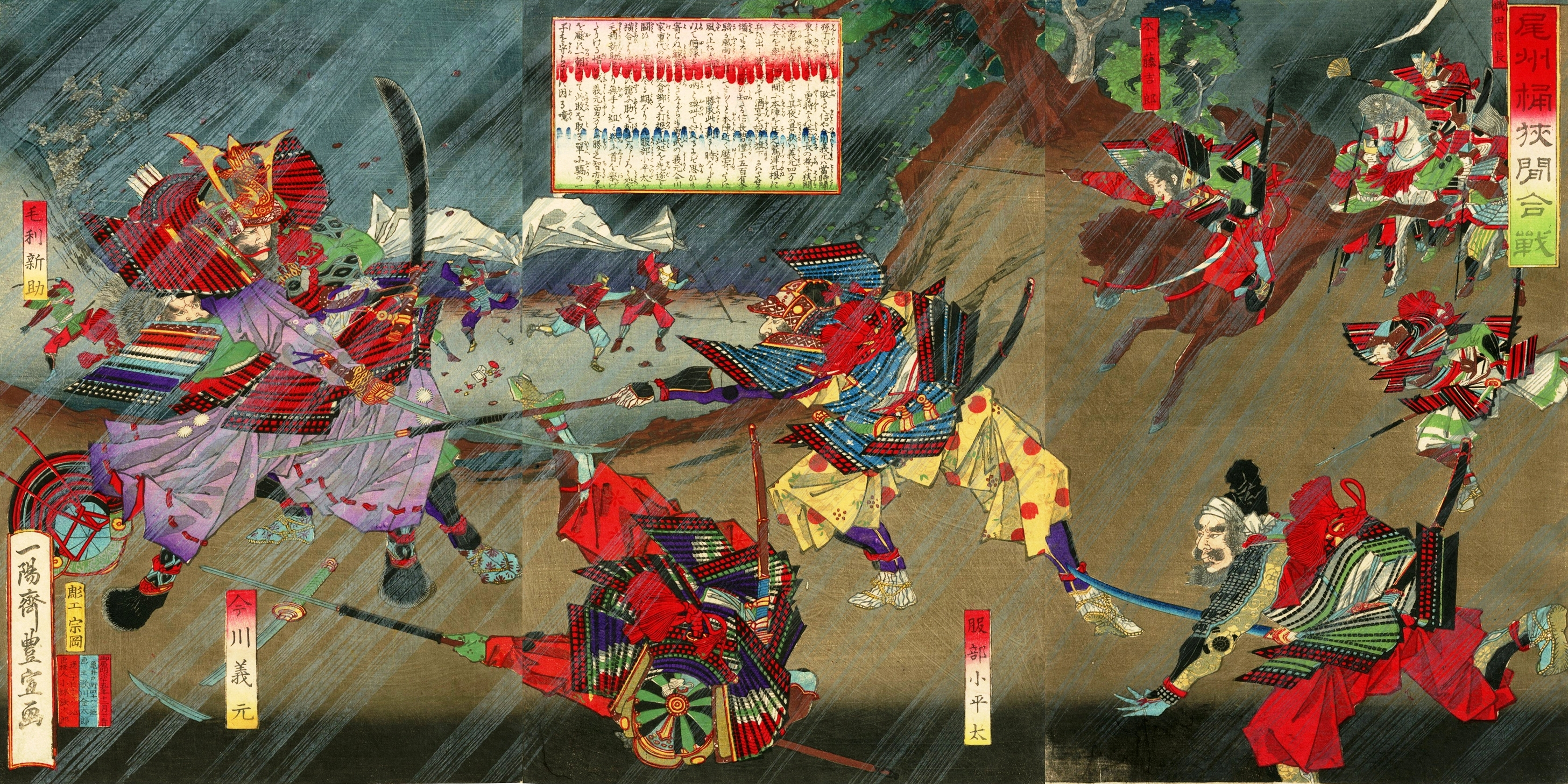
Battle of Okehazama (May–June 1560)

=== Early modern period ===
During this period Nagoya Castle was constructed, built partly from materials taken from Kiyosu Castle. During the construction, the entire town around Kiyosu Castle, consisting of around 60,000 people, moved from Kiyosu to the newly planned town around Nagoya Castle. Around the same time, the nearby ancient Atsuta Shrine was designated as a waystation, called Miya (the Shrine), on the important Tōkaidō road, which linked the two capitals of Kyoto and Edo (now Tokyo). A town developed around the temple to support travelers. The castle and shrine towns formed the city.

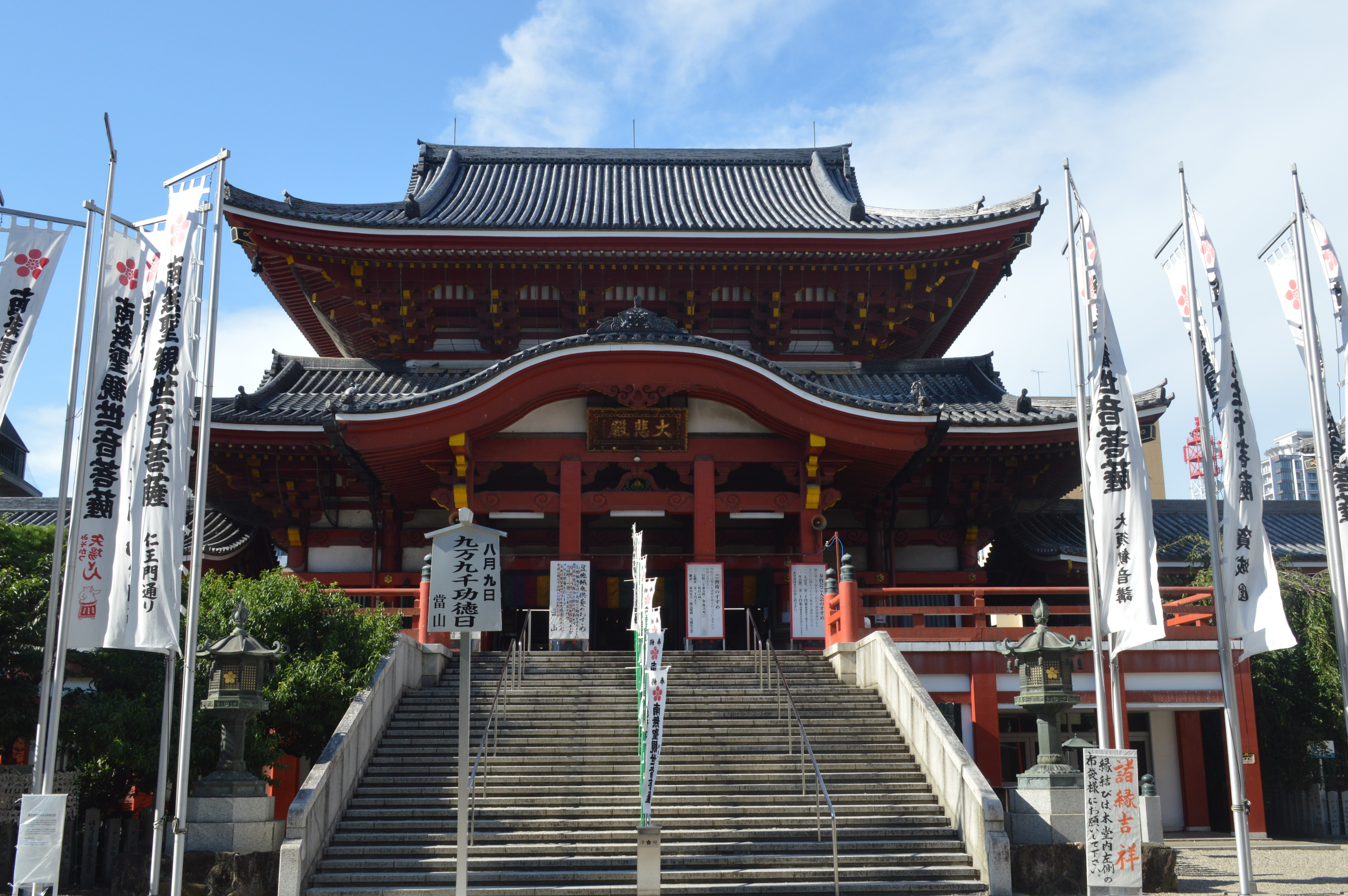
Ōsu Kannon is a Buddhist temple, originally built in 1333, later relocated in 1612.

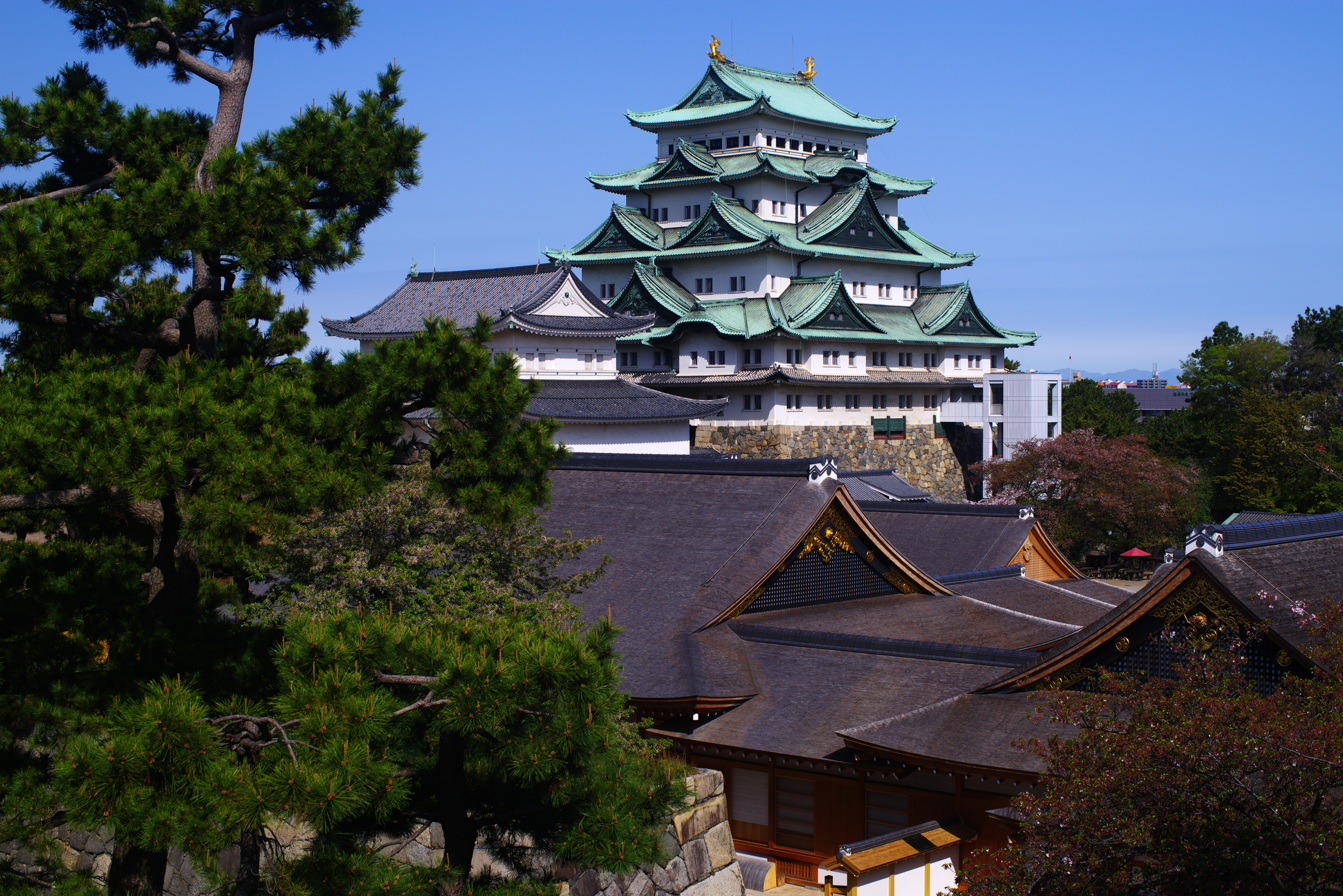
Nagoya Castle was constructed as the seat of the Owari branch of the ruling Tokugawa clan.

=== Modern period ===
Meiji period

During the Meiji Restoration Japan's provinces were restructured into prefectures and the government changed from family to bureaucratic rule. Nagoya was proclaimed a city on 1 October 1889, and designated a city on 1 September 1956 by government ordinance. Nagoya became an industrial hub for the region. Its economic sphere included the famous pottery towns of Tokoname, Tajimi and Seto, as well as Okazaki, one of the only places where gunpowder was produced under the shogunate. Other industries included cotton and complex mechanical dolls called karakuri ningyō.

Taisho period

Mitsubishi Aircraft Company was established in 1920 in Nagoya and became one of the largest aircraft manufacturers in Japan. The availability of space and the central location of the region and the well-established connectivity were some of the major factors that lead to the establishment of the aviation industry there.

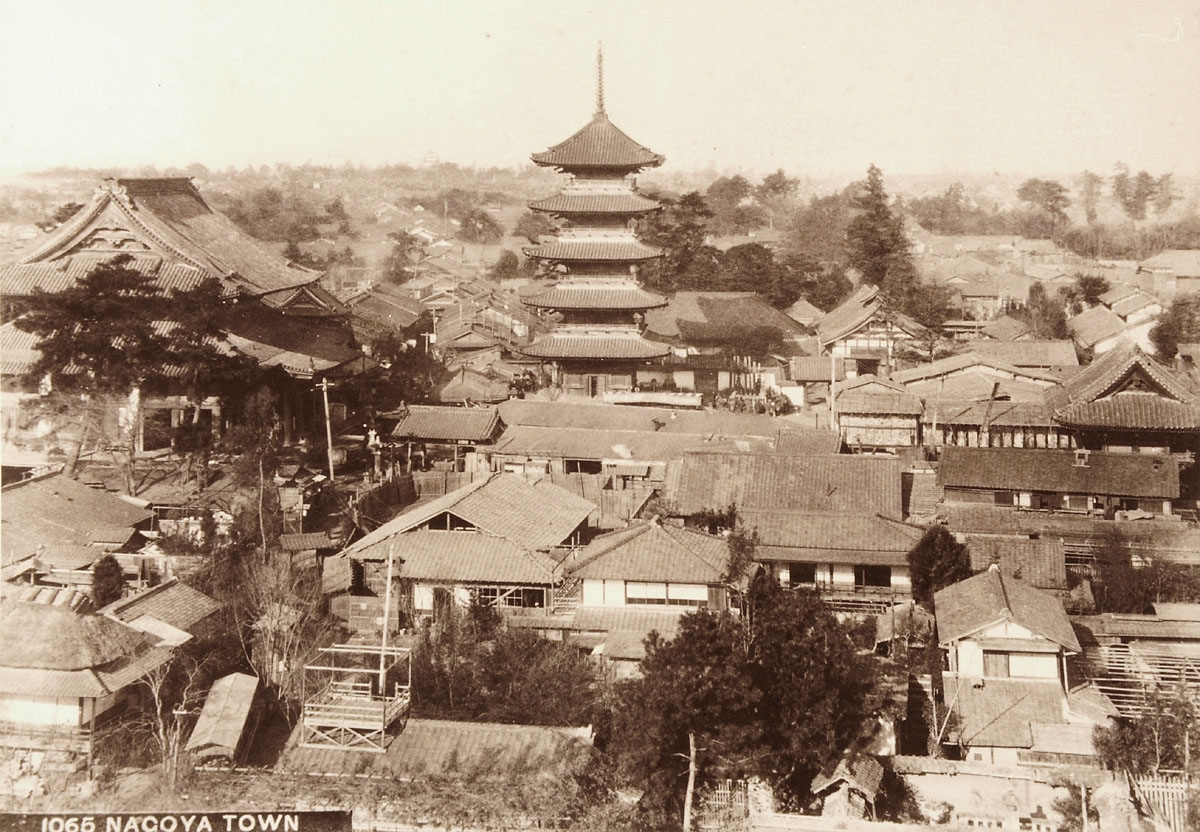
Photo of Nagoya, 1880–1890

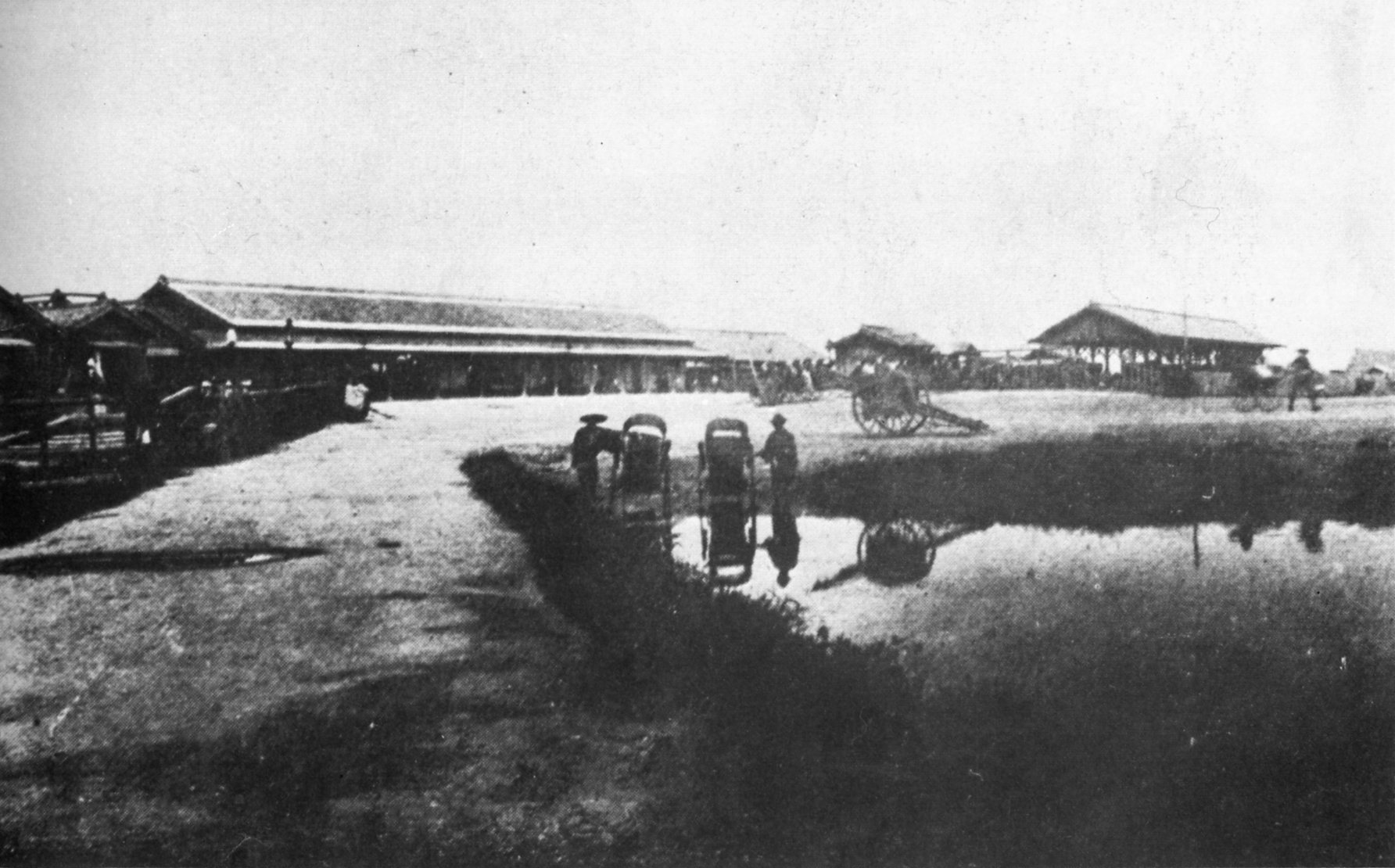
Nagoya Station in 1886

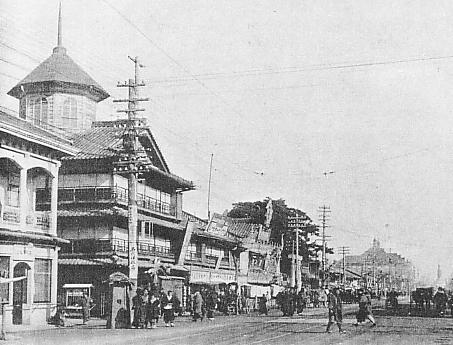
Hirokoji in Nagoya during the Meiji era

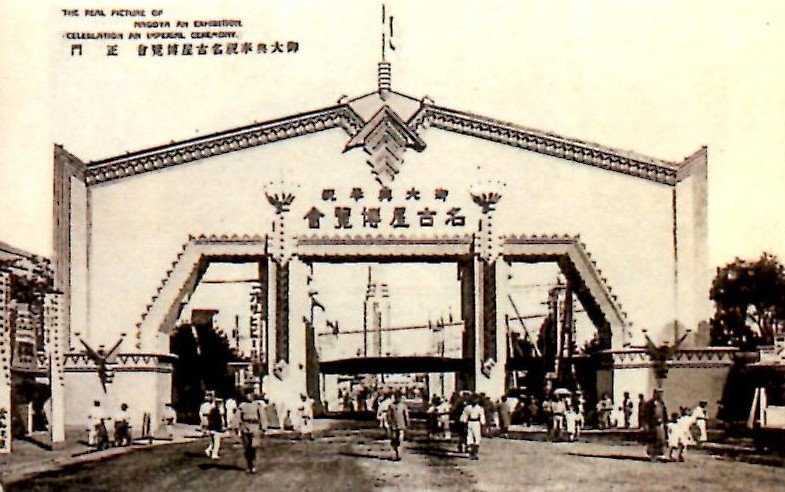
Main Gate of the Nagoya Expo in Tsuruma Park, 1928

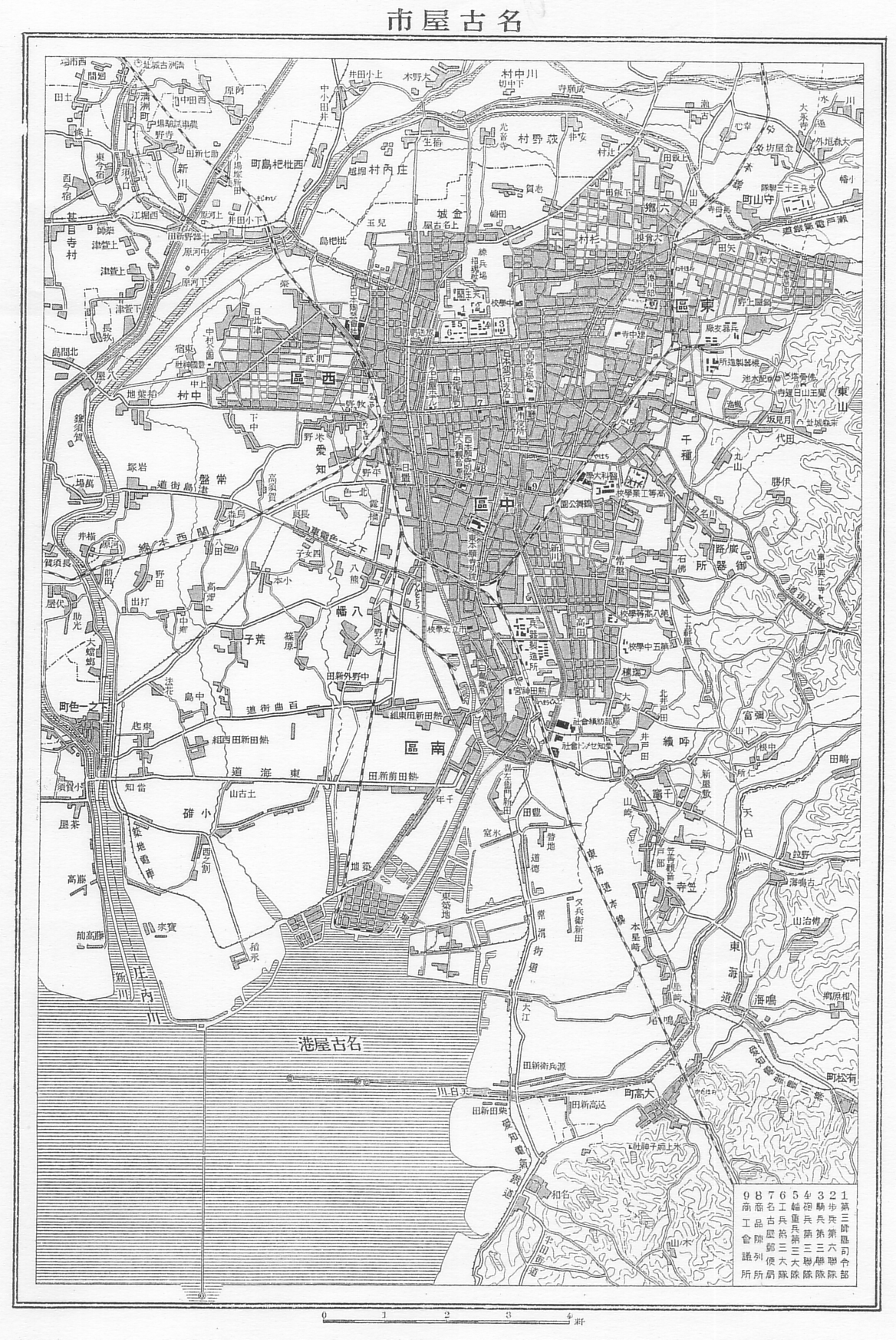
Nagoya map circa 1930

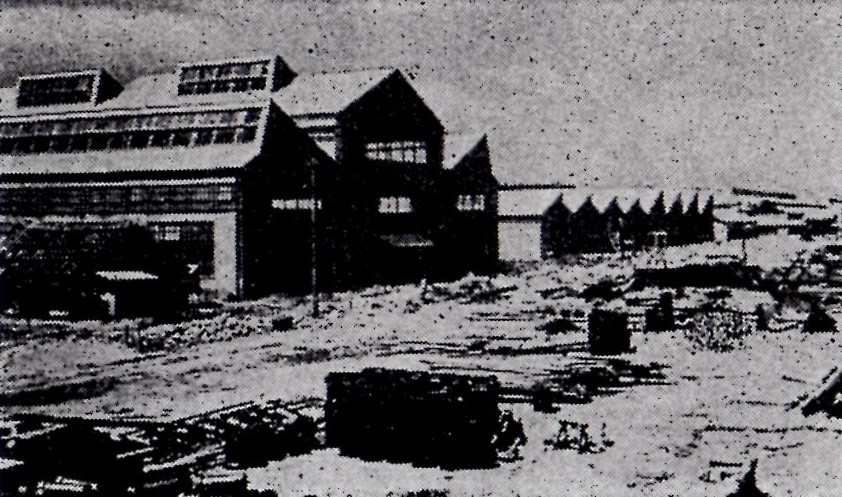
Toyota Koromo plant (now the Toyota Commemorative Museum of Industry and Technology) in 1938

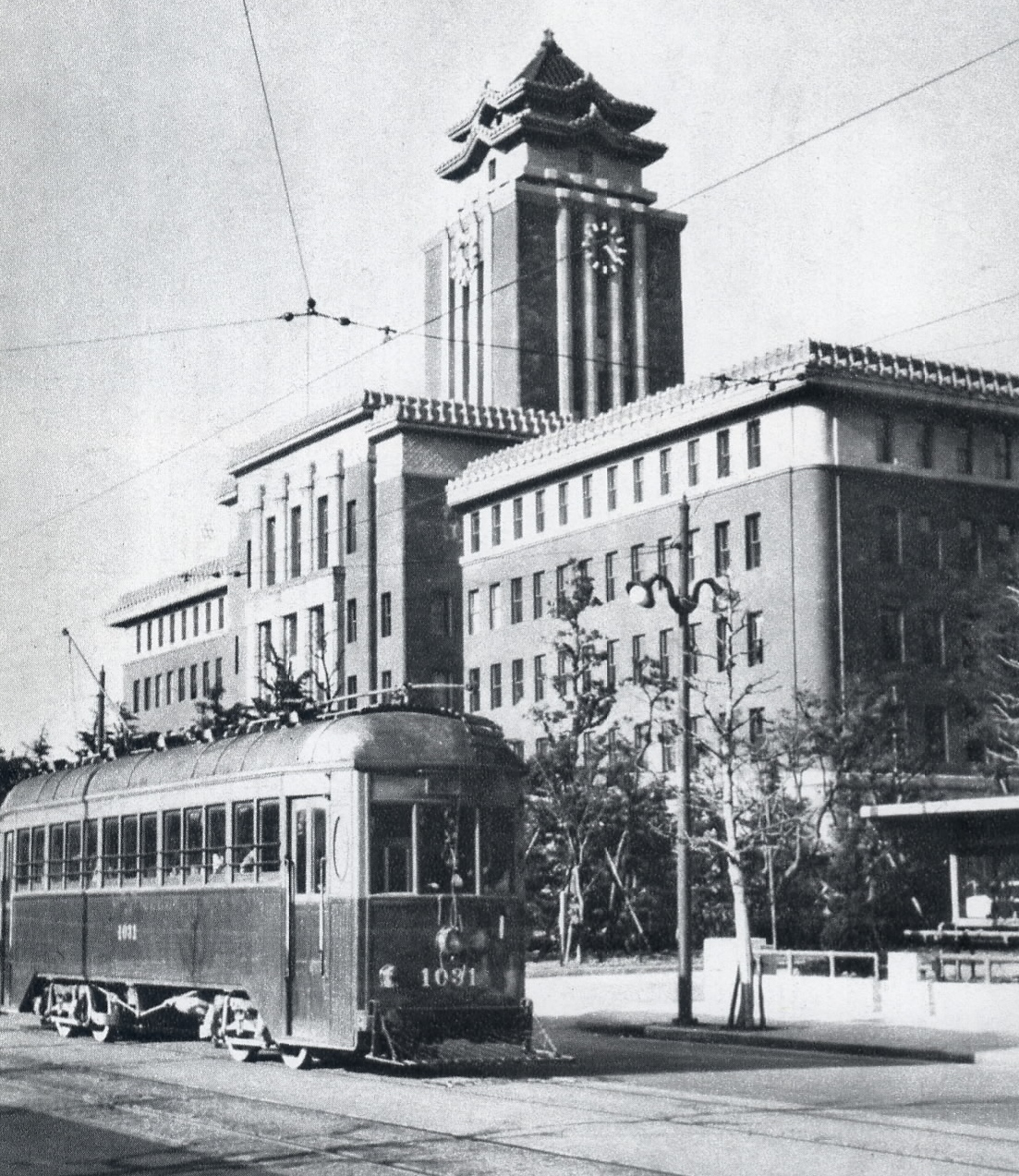
Nagoya City Hall in the Showa period

Pacific War and post-war years

Nagoya was the target of air raids during the Pacific War. The population of Nagoya at this time was estimated to be 1.5 million, fourth among Japanese cities and one of the three largest centers of the Japanese aircraft industry. It was estimated that 25% of its workers were engaged in aircraft production. Important Japanese aircraft targets (numbers 193, 194, 198, 2010, and 1729) were within Nagoya. Others, notably 240 and 1833, were to the north of Kagamigahara. It was estimated that they produced between 40% and 50% of Japanese combat aircraft and engines, such as the vital Mitsubishi A6M Zero fighter. The Nagoya area also produced machine tools, bearings, railway equipment, metal alloys, tanks, motor vehicles and processed foods during the war.

Air raids began on 18 April 1942, with an attack on a Mitsubishi Heavy Industries aircraft works, the Matsuhigecho oil warehouse, the Nagoya Castle military barracks and the Nagoya war industries plant. The bombing continued to the spring of 1945, and included large-scale firebombing. Nagoya was the target of two of Bomber Command's attacks. These incendiary attacks, one by day and one by night, devastated 15.3 square kilometres (5.9 mi^{2}). The XXI Bomber Command established a new U.S. Army Air Force record with the greatest tonnage ever released on a single target in one mission—3,162 tons of incendiaries. It destroyed or damaged twenty-eight of the numbered targets and raised the area burned to almost one-fourth of the entire city.

Nagoya Castle, which was being used as a military command post, was hit and mostly destroyed on 14 May 1945, followed by the Yokkaichi bombing in June 1945. Reconstruction of the main building was completed in 1959. On 26 July 1945, the Enola Gay dropped a conventional pumpkin bomb in the Yagoto area of Nagoya while training for their nuclear mission to Hiroshima. In 1959, the city was flooded and severely damaged by the Ise-wan Typhoon.

=== Contemporary period ===
After the war Nagoya was able to rebuild and take up its role again as one of Japan's leading industrial and manufacturing centers. It became known as the "Houston and Montreal of the Orient". It also plays an increasing role in the meetings, incentives, conferencing, exhibitions (MICE) industry, hosting the Expo 2005 and the Nagoya Protocol conference in 2010.

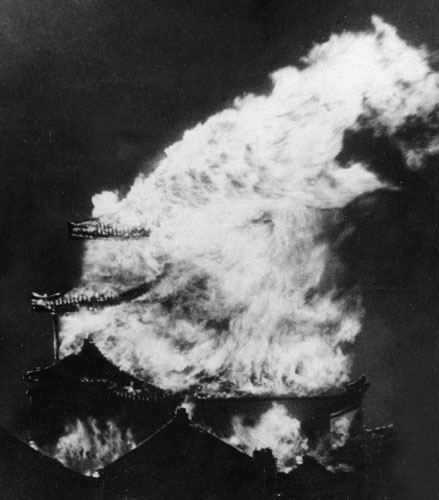
Nagoya Castle on fire 1945

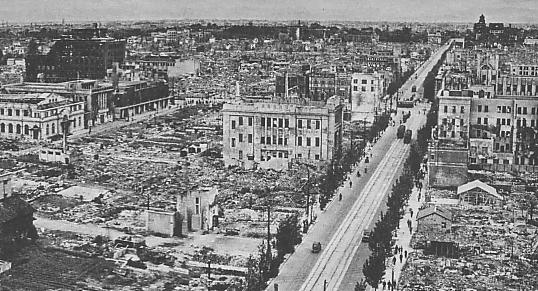
A view of Nagoya after the bombing in 1945

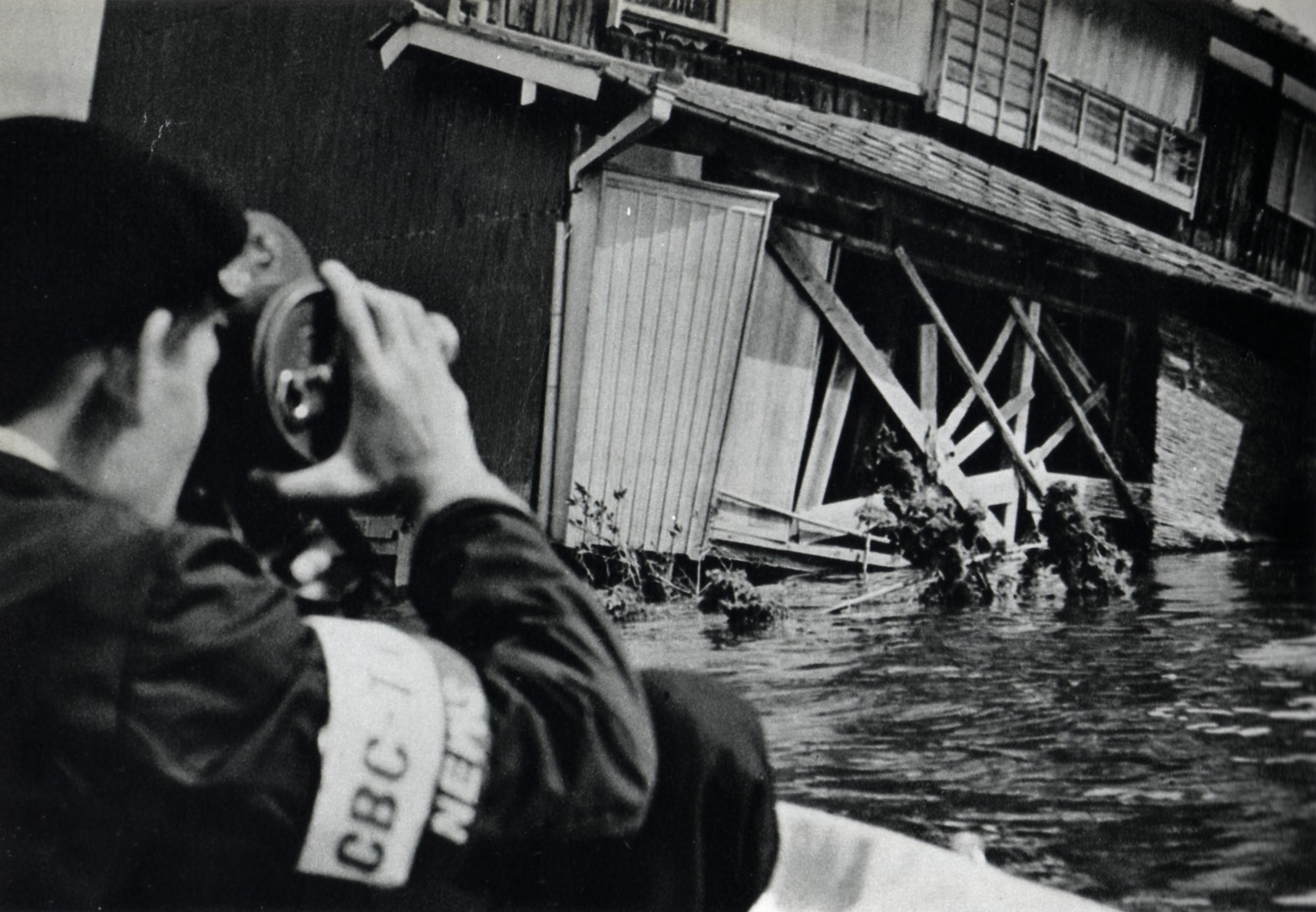
Damage from the Ise-wan Typhoon (Typhoon Vera) in 1959

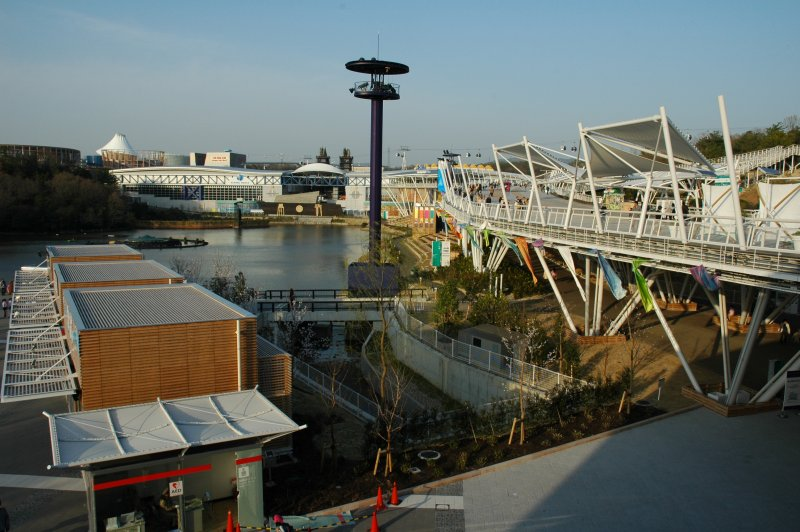
The Expo 2005 was the second world's fair held in Japan.

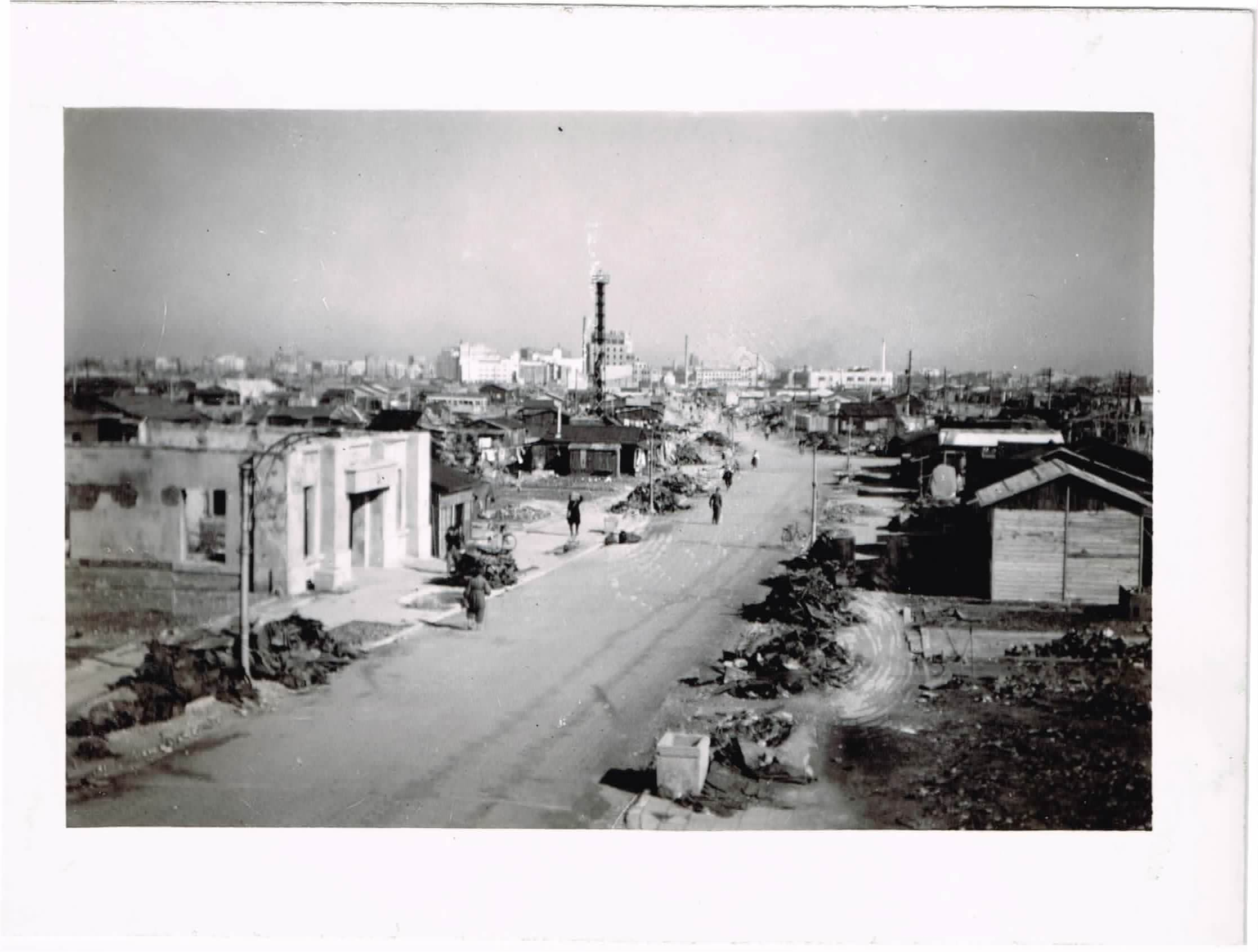
1945, after WWII

== Geography and administrative divisions ==
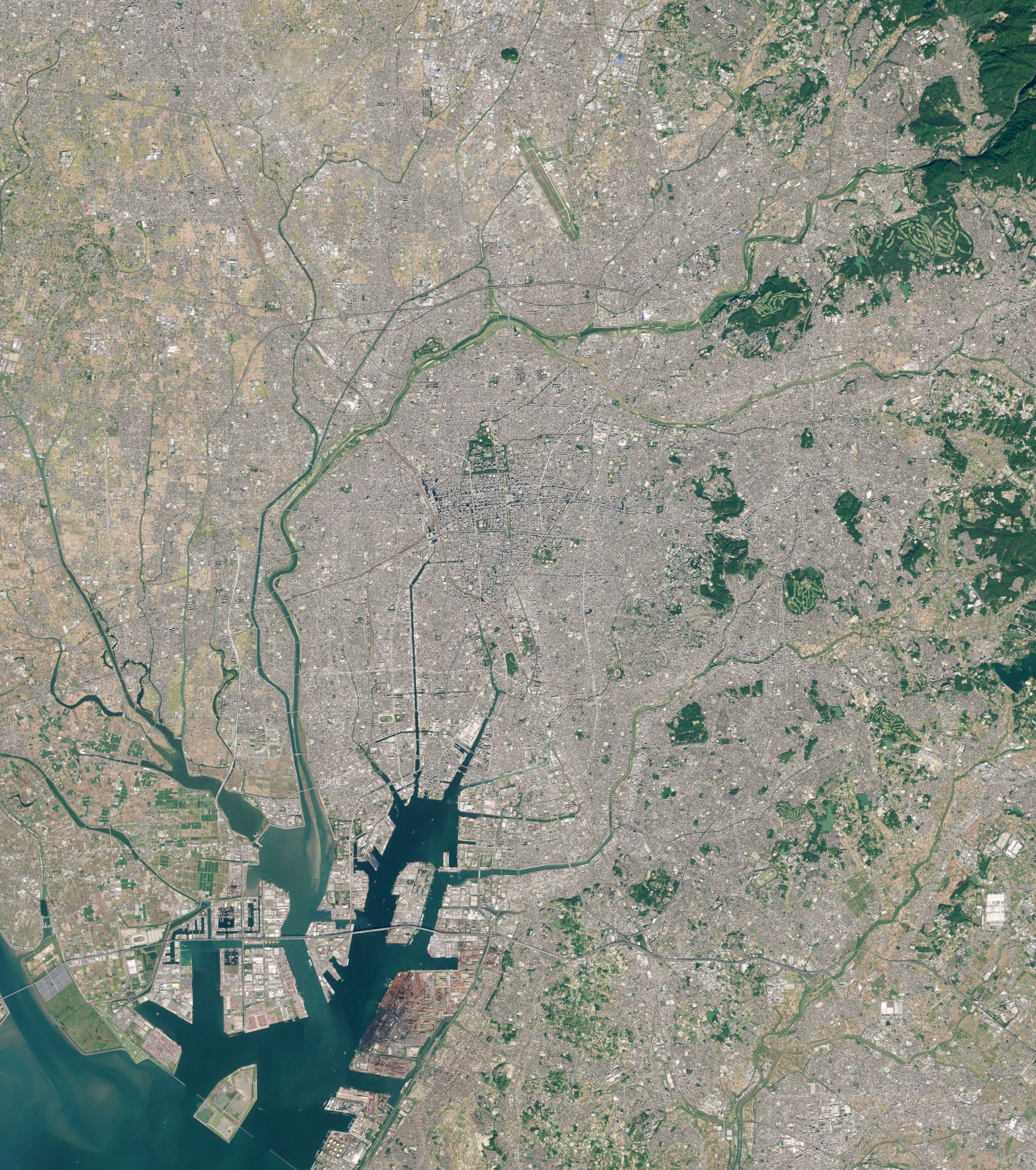
A satellite picture of Nagoya

=== Geography ===
Nagoya lies north of Ise Bay on the Nōbi Plain. Nagoya was built on low-level plateaus to ward off floodwaters. The plain is one of the nation's most fertile areas. The Kiso River flows to the west along the city border, and the Shōnai River comes from the northeast and turns south towards the bay at Nishi Ward.

The human-made Hori River was constructed as a canal in 1610. It flows from north to south, as part of the Shōnai River system. The rivers allowed for trade with the hinterland. The Tempaku River feeds from a number of smaller river in the east, flows briefly south at Nonami and then west at Ōdaka into the bay.

Nagoya's location and its position in the centre of Japan allowed it to develop economically and politically.

Gallery

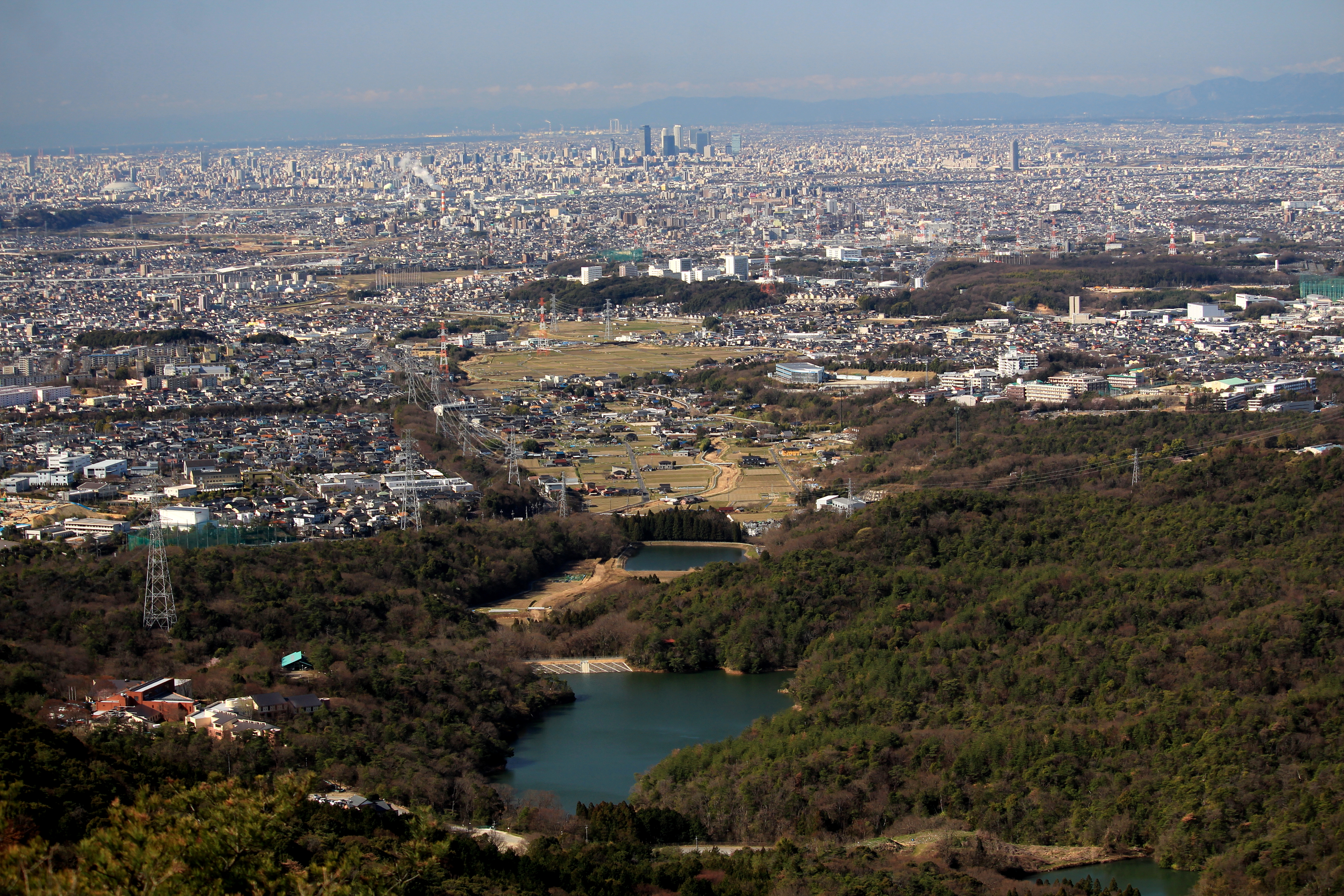
Nagoya and the Nobi Plain seen from Mirokuzan (Kasugai city)

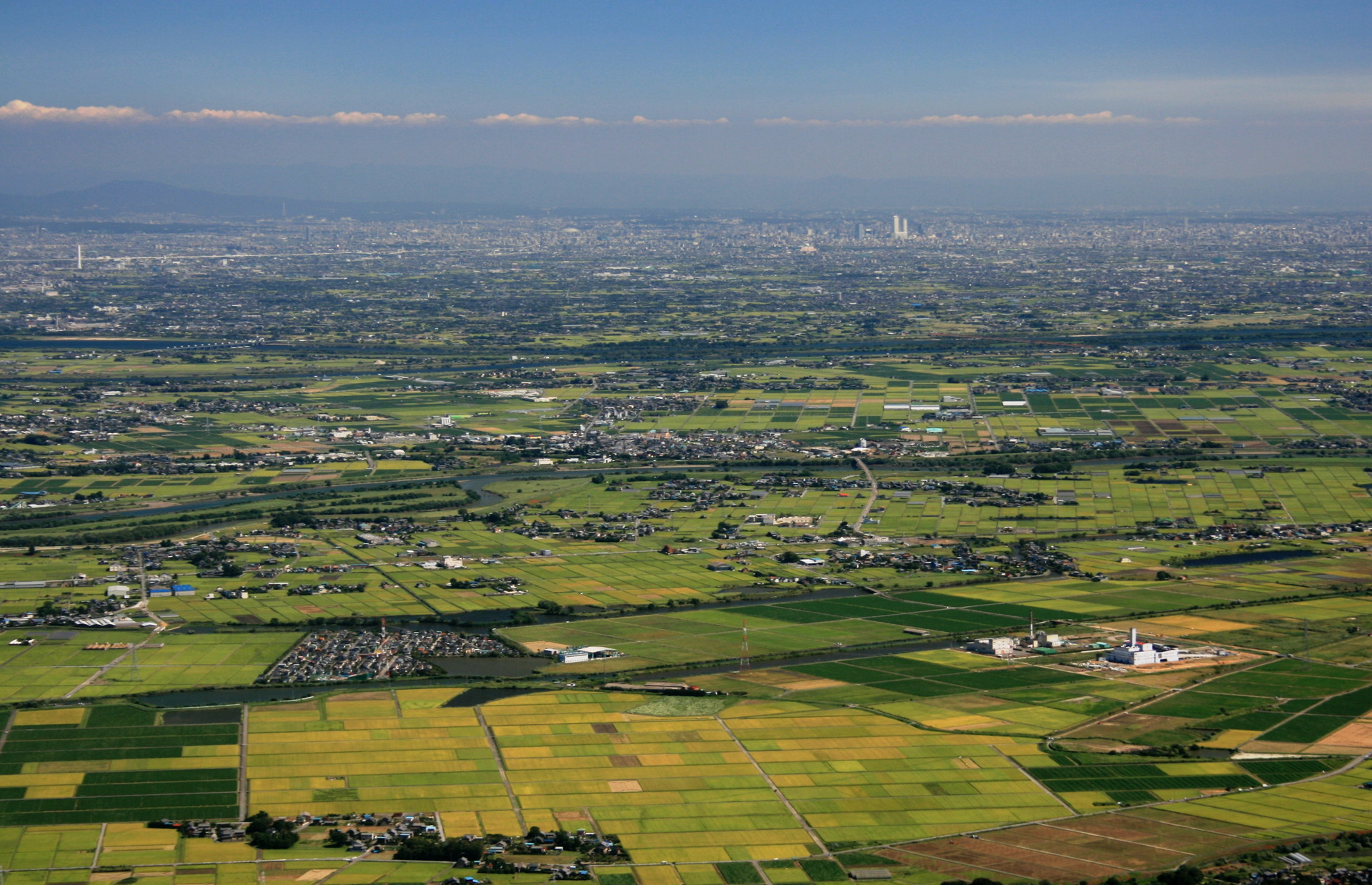
A view of the Nōbi Plain, Kiso Three Rivers and Nagoya from Mount Sanpo and Mount Yōrō

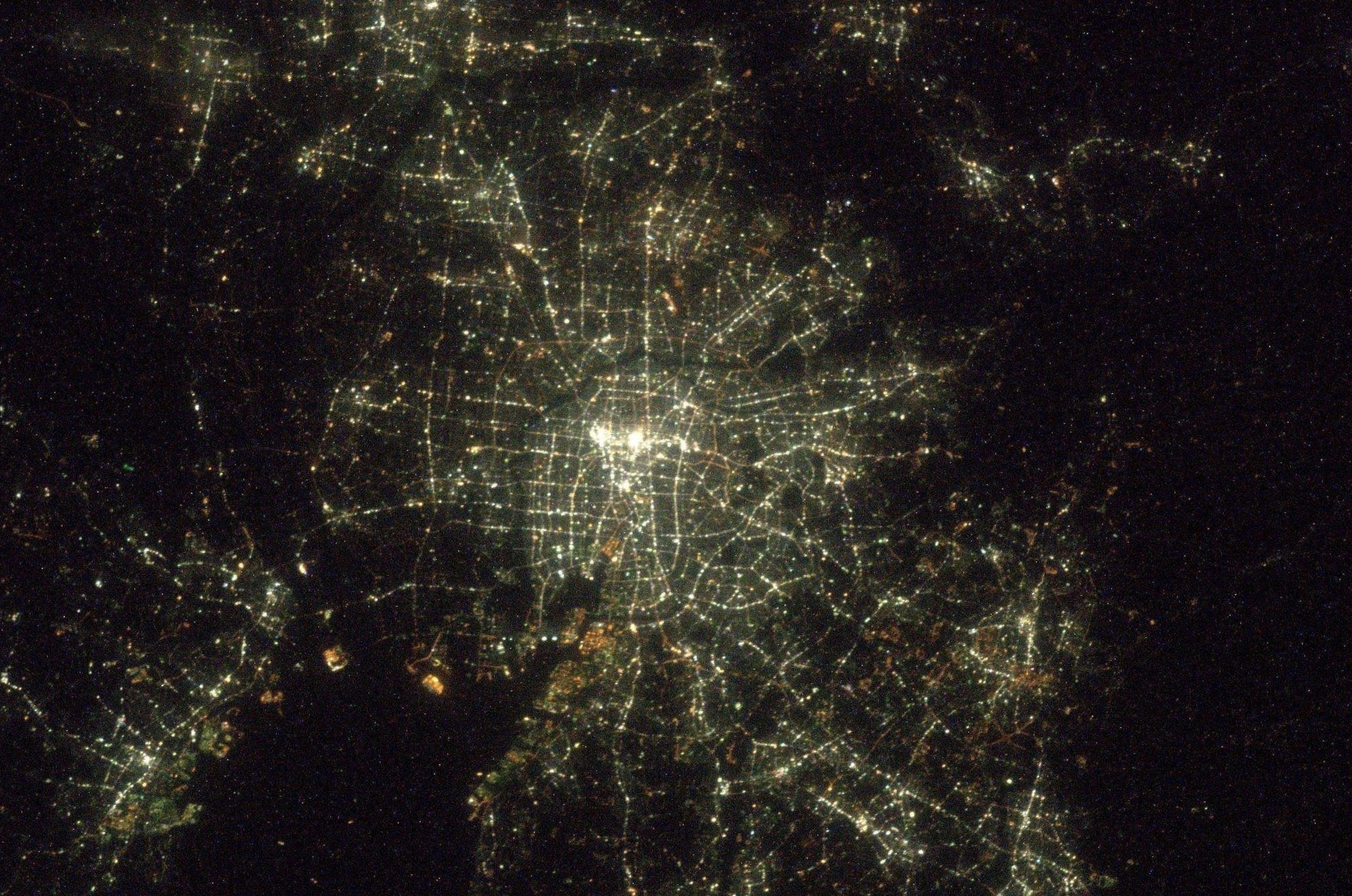
An aerial photograph of Nagoya at night

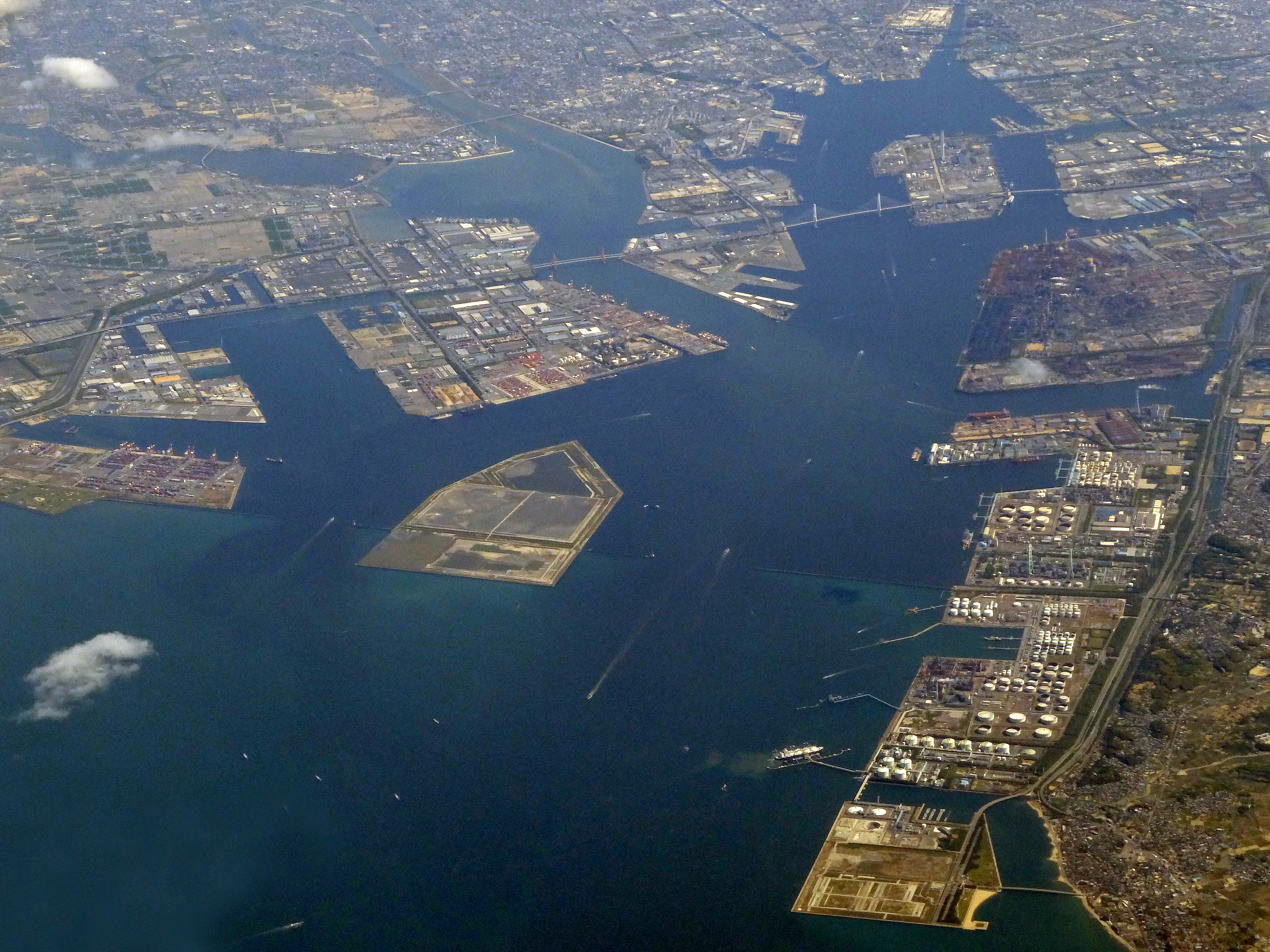
Nagoya Port in 2013

=== Climate ===
Nagoya has a humid subtropical climate (Köppen climate classification: Cfa) with hot, humid summers and cool winters. The summer is noticeably wetter than the winter, with rain falling throughout the year.

Climate data for Nagoya (1991–2020 normals, extremes 1890–present)
Month	Jan	Feb	Mar	Apr	May	Jun	Jul	Aug	Sep	Oct	Nov	Dec	Year
Record high °C (°F)	21.0 (69.8)	23.5 (74.3)	25.8 (78.4)	30.5 (86.9)	34.8 (94.6)	37.9 (100.2)	39.9 (103.8)	40.3 (104.5)	38.0 (100.4)	32.7 (90.9)	27.2 (81.0)	22.6 (72.7)	40.3 (104.5)
Mean maximum °C (°F)	13.9 (57.0)	17.2 (63.0)	21.3 (70.3)	26.8 (80.2)	30.9 (87.6)	33.0 (91.4)	36.3 (97.3)	37.0 (98.6)	34.1 (93.4)	28.8 (83.8)	22.7 (72.9)	17.4 (63.3)	37.4 (99.3)
Mean daily maximum °C (°F)	9.3 (48.7)	10.5 (50.9)	14.5 (58.1)	20.1 (68.2)	24.6 (76.3)	27.6 (81.7)	31.4 (88.5)	33.2 (91.8)	29.1 (84.4)	23.3 (73.9)	17.3 (63.1)	11.7 (53.1)	21.1 (70.0)
Daily mean °C (°F)	4.8 (40.6)	5.5 (41.9)	9.2 (48.6)	14.6 (58.3)	19.4 (66.9)	23.0 (73.4)	26.9 (80.4)	28.2 (82.8)	24.5 (76.1)	18.6 (65.5)	12.6 (54.7)	7.2 (45.0)	16.2 (61.2)
Mean daily minimum °C (°F)	1.1 (34.0)	1.4 (34.5)	4.6 (40.3)	9.7 (49.5)	14.9 (58.8)	19.4 (66.9)	23.5 (74.3)	24.7 (76.5)	21.0 (69.8)	14.8 (58.6)	8.6 (47.5)	3.4 (38.1)	12.3 (54.1)
Mean minimum °C (°F)	−2.6 (27.3)	−2.5 (27.5)	−0.4 (31.3)	4.9 (40.8)	9.7 (49.5)	15.3 (59.5)	20.0 (68.0)	21.1 (70.0)	15.4 (59.7)	9.1 (48.4)	3.2 (37.8)	−1.0 (30.2)	−3.3 (26.1)
Record low °C (°F)	−10.3 (13.5)	−9.5 (14.9)	−6.8 (19.8)	−2.1 (28.2)	2.8 (37.0)	8.2 (46.8)	14.0 (57.2)	14.4 (57.9)	9.5 (49.1)	1.5 (34.7)	−2.7 (27.1)	−7.2 (19.0)	−10.3 (13.5)
Average precipitation mm (inches)	50.8 (2.00)	64.7 (2.55)	116.2 (4.57)	127.5 (5.02)	150.3 (5.92)	186.5 (7.34)	211.4 (8.32)	139.5 (5.49)	231.6 (9.12)	164.7 (6.48)	79.1 (3.11)	56.6 (2.23)	1,578.9 (62.16)
Average snowfall cm (inches)	4 (1.6)	5 (2.0)	0 (0)	0 (0)	0 (0)	0 (0)	0 (0)	0 (0)	0 (0)	0 (0)	0 (0)	3 (1.2)	12 (4.7)
Average precipitation days (≥ 0.5 mm)	6.3	7.2	9.8	10.4	10.7	12.7	13.0	9.4	11.9	10.0	7.0	7.5	115.9
Average relative humidity (%)	64	60	58	59	64	71	73	69	70	68	66	66	66
Mean monthly sunshine hours	174.5	175.5	199.7	200.2	205.5	151.8	166.0	201.3	159.6	168.9	167.1	170.3	2,141
Average ultraviolet index	2	4	6	7	9	10	10	10	8	6	3	2	6
Source: Japan Meteorological Agency

=== Area ===
==== Wards ====
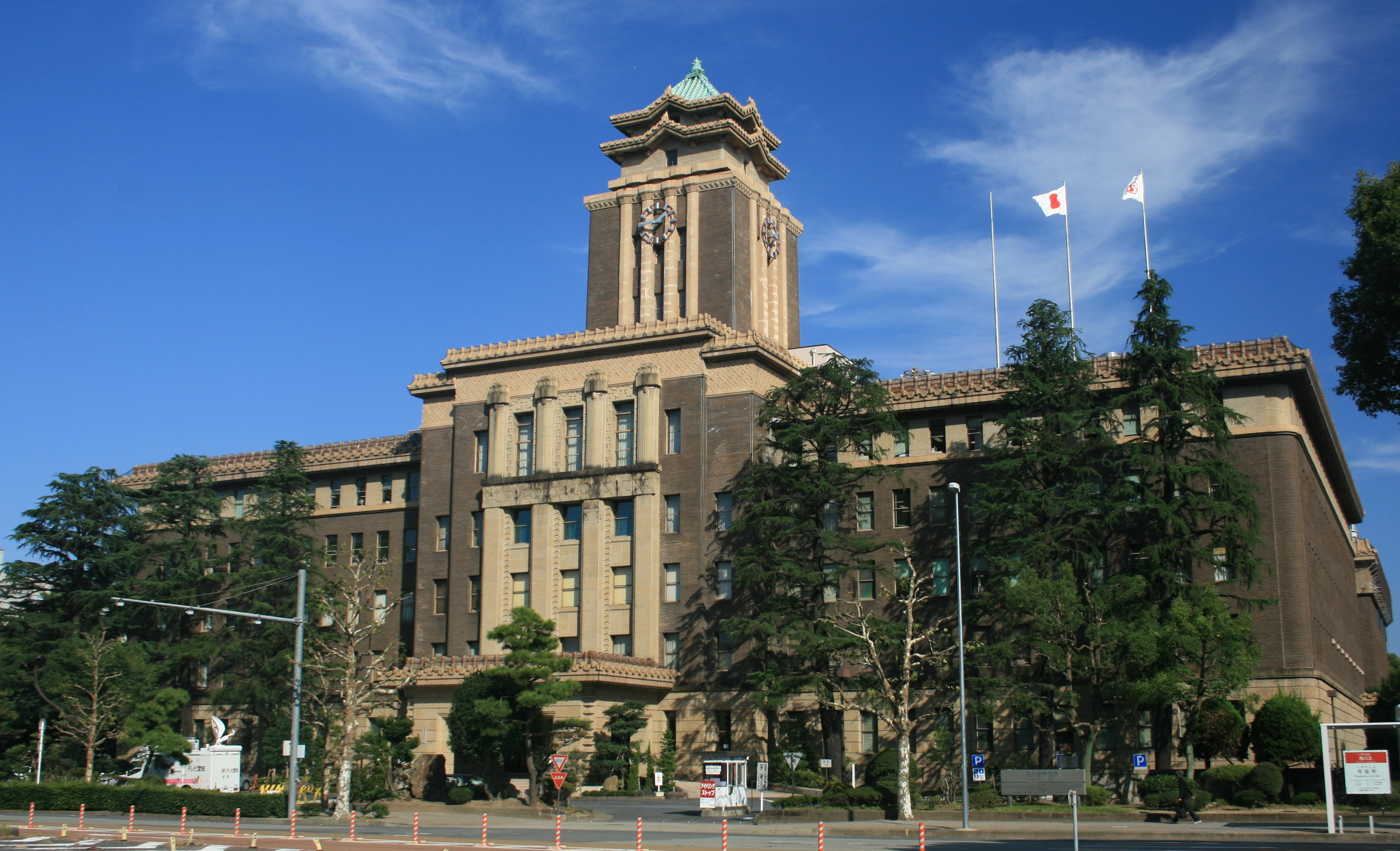
Nagoya City Hall

Nagoya has 16 wards.

Wards of Nagoya
	Place Name					Map of Nagoya
	Rōmaji	Kanji	Population	Land area in km^{2}	Pop. density per km^{2}	
1	Atsuta-ku	熱田区	66,318	8.20	8,088	A map of Nagoya's Wards
2	Chikusa-ku	千種区	165,863	18.18	9,123	A map of Nagoya's Wards
3	Higashi-ku	東区	82,939	7.71	10,757	A map of Nagoya's Wards
4	Kita-ku	北区	163,555	17.53	9,330	A map of Nagoya's Wards
5	Meitō-ku	名東区	165,287	19.45	8,498	A map of Nagoya's Wards
6	Midori-ku	緑区	247,475	37.91	6,528	A map of Nagoya's Wards
7	Minami-ku	南区	136,015	18.46	7,368	A map of Nagoya's Wards
8	Minato-ku	港区	143,913	45.64	3,153	A map of Nagoya's Wards
9	Mizuho-ku	瑞穂区	107,622	11.22	9,592	A map of Nagoya's Wards
10	Moriyama-ku	守山区	176,298	34.01	5,184	A map of Nagoya's Wards
11	Naka-ku – administrative center	中区	90,918	9.38	9,693	A map of Nagoya's Wards
12	Nakagawa-ku	中川区	220,782	32.02	6,895	A map of Nagoya's Wards
13	Nakamura-ku	中村区	135,134	16.30	8,290	A map of Nagoya's Wards
14	Nishi-ku	西区	150,480	17.93	8,393	A map of Nagoya's Wards
15	Shōwa-ku	昭和区	110,436	10.94	10,095	A map of Nagoya's Wards
16	Tenpaku-ku	天白区	164,522	21.58	7,624	A map of Nagoya's Wards

=== Demographics ===
Historical population
Year	Pop.	±%
1873	125,193	—
1889	157,496	+25.8%
1920	677,452	+330.1%
1925	842,835	+24.4%
1930	991,833	+17.7%
1935	1,182,837	+19.3%
1940	1,415,117	+19.6%
1945	971,374	−31.4%
1950	1,157,263	+19.1%
1955	1,420,572	+22.8%
1960	1,697,093	+19.5%
1965	1,935,430	+14.0%
1970	2,036,053	+5.2%
1975	2,079,740	+2.1%
1980	2,087,902	+0.4%
1985	2,116,381	+1.4%
1990	2,154,793	+1.8%
1995	2,152,184	−0.1%
2000	2,171,557	+0.9%
2005	2,215,062	+2.0%
2010	2,263,907	+2.2%
2015	2,295,638	+1.4%
2020	2,330,178	+1.5%
2025	2,337,864	+0.3%

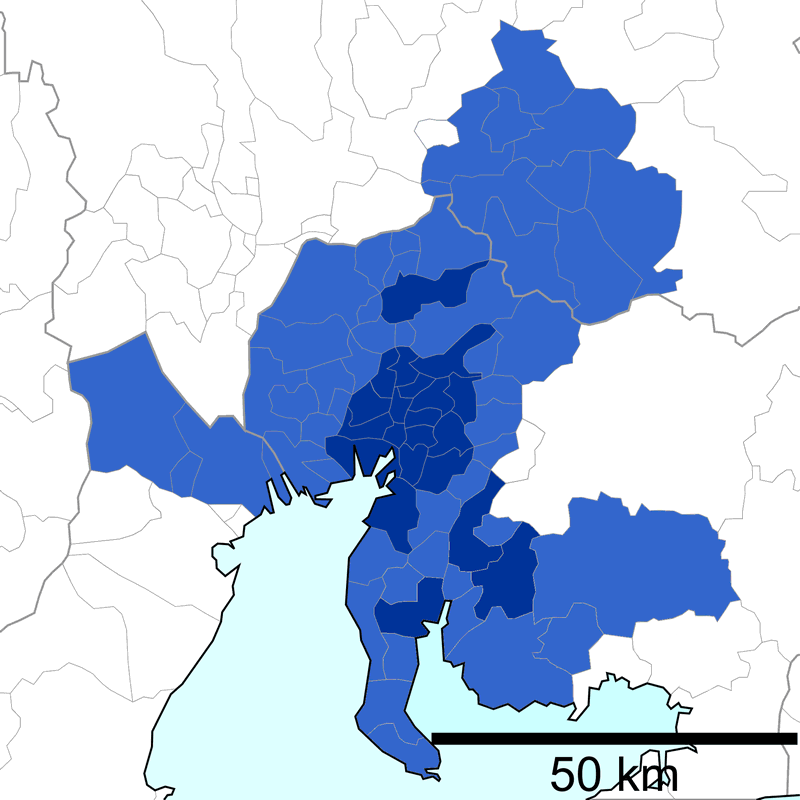
Nagoya metropolitan employment area as of 2015

One of the earliest censuses, carried out in 1889, counted 157,496 residents. The population reached the 1 million mark in 1934 and as of September 2025 had an estimated population of 2,337,864 with a population density of 7,161.5 inhabitants per square kilometre (18,548/sq mi). Also as of July 2025 an estimated 1,193,148 households resided there—a significant increase from 153,370 at the end of the Pacific War in 1945.

The area is 3,704 square kilometres (1,430.12 sq mi). Its metropolitan area extends into the Mie and Gifu prefectures, with a total population of about 10 million people, surpassed only by Osaka and Tokyo.

=== Surrounding municipalities ===
- Aichi Prefecture
  - Ama
  - Kanie
  - Kasugai
  - Kitanagoya
  - Kiyosu
  - Nagakute
  - Nisshin
  - Ōbu
  - Ōharu
  - Owariasahi
  - Seto
  - Tobishima
  - Tōgō
  - Tōkai
  - Toyoake
  - Toyoyama

== Public services ==
=== Police ===
Aichi Prefectural Police

- Atsuta Police Station
- Chikusa Police Station
- Higashi Police Station
- Kita Police Station
- Meito Police Station
- Midori Police Station
- Minami Police Station
- Minato Police Station
- Mizuho Police Station
- Moriyama Police Station
- Naka Police Station
- Nakagawa Police Station
- Nakamura Police Station
- Nishi Police Station
- Showa Police Station
- Tenpaku Police Station

=== Firefighting ===
Nagoya City Fire Bureau

- Atsuta Fire Department
- Chikusa Fire Department
- Higashi Fire Department
- Kita Fire Department
- Meito Fire Department
- Midori Fire Department
- Minami Fire Department
- Minato Fire Department
- Mizuho Fire Department
- Moriyama Fire Department
- Naka Fire Department
- Nakagawa Fire Department
- Nakamura Fire Department
- Nishi Fire Department
- Showa Fire Department
- Tenpaku Fire Department

=== Health care ===
Hospital

- Chubu Rosai Hospital
- Social Insurance Chukyo Hospital
- Nagoya City East Medical Center
- Nagoya City West Medical Center
- Nagoya City University Hospital
- Nagoya Daiichi Red Cross Hospital
- Nagoya Daini Red Cross Hospital
- Nagoya Ekisaikai Hospital
- Nagoya Memorial Hospital
- Nagoya University Hospital
- National Hospital Organization Nagoya Medical Center

=== Post office ===
- Atsuta Post Office
- Chikusa Post Office
- Meito Post Office
- Mizuho Post Office
- Moriyama Post Office
- Nagoya Central Post Office
- Nagoya Higashi Post Office
- Nagoya Jingu Post Office
- Nagoya Kita Post Office
- Nagoya Midori Post Office
- Nagoya Minami Post Office
- Nagoya Minato Post Office
- Nagoya Naka Post Office
- Nagoya Nishi Post Office
- Nakagawa Post Office
- Nakamura Post Office
- Showa Post Office
- Tenpaku Post Office

=== Library ===
- Aichi Prefectural Library
- Nagoya City Library
- Nagoya City Atsuta Library
- Nagoya City Chikusa Library
- Nagoya City Higashi Library
- Nagoya City Kita Library
- Nagoya City Kusunoki Library
- Nagoya City Meito Library
- Nagoya City Midori Library
- Nagoya City Minami Library
- Nagoya City Minato Library
- Nagoya City Mizuho Library
- Nagoya City Moriyama Library
- Nagoya City Nakagawa Library
- Nagoya City Nanyo Library
- Nagoya City Nishi Library
- Nagoya City Nakamura Library
- Nagoya City Shidami Library
- Nagoya City Tenpaku Library
- Nagoya City Tokushige Library
- Nagoya City Tomida Library
- Nagoya City Tsuruma Library
- Nagoya City Yamada Library

=== Playhouses and cultural facilities ===
- Aichi Arts Center
- Atsuta Playhouse
- Chikusa Playhouse
- Chunichi Theatre
- Higashi Playhouse
- Kita Playhouse
- Meito Playhouse
- Midori Playhouse
- Minami Playhouse
- Minato Playhouse
- Misono-za
- Mizuho Playhouse
- Moriyama Playhouse
- Munetsugu Hall
- Nagoya Citizens' Auditorium
- Nagoya Noh Theater
- Nakagawa Playhouse
- Nakamura Playhouse
- Nishi Playhouse
- Osu Engeijo
- Showa Playhouse
- Shirakawa Hall
- Tenpaku Playhouse
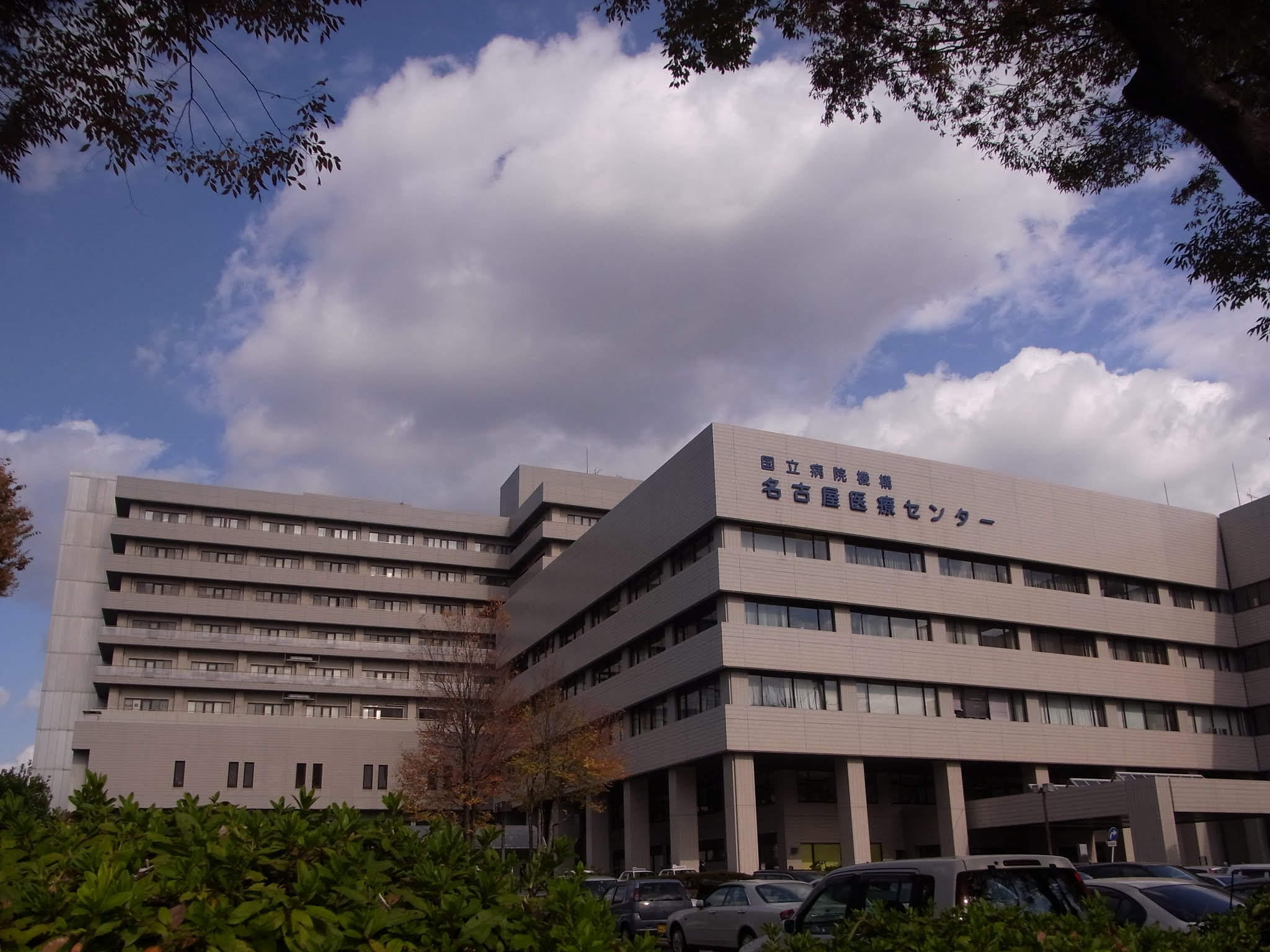
National Hospital Organization Nagoya Medical Center

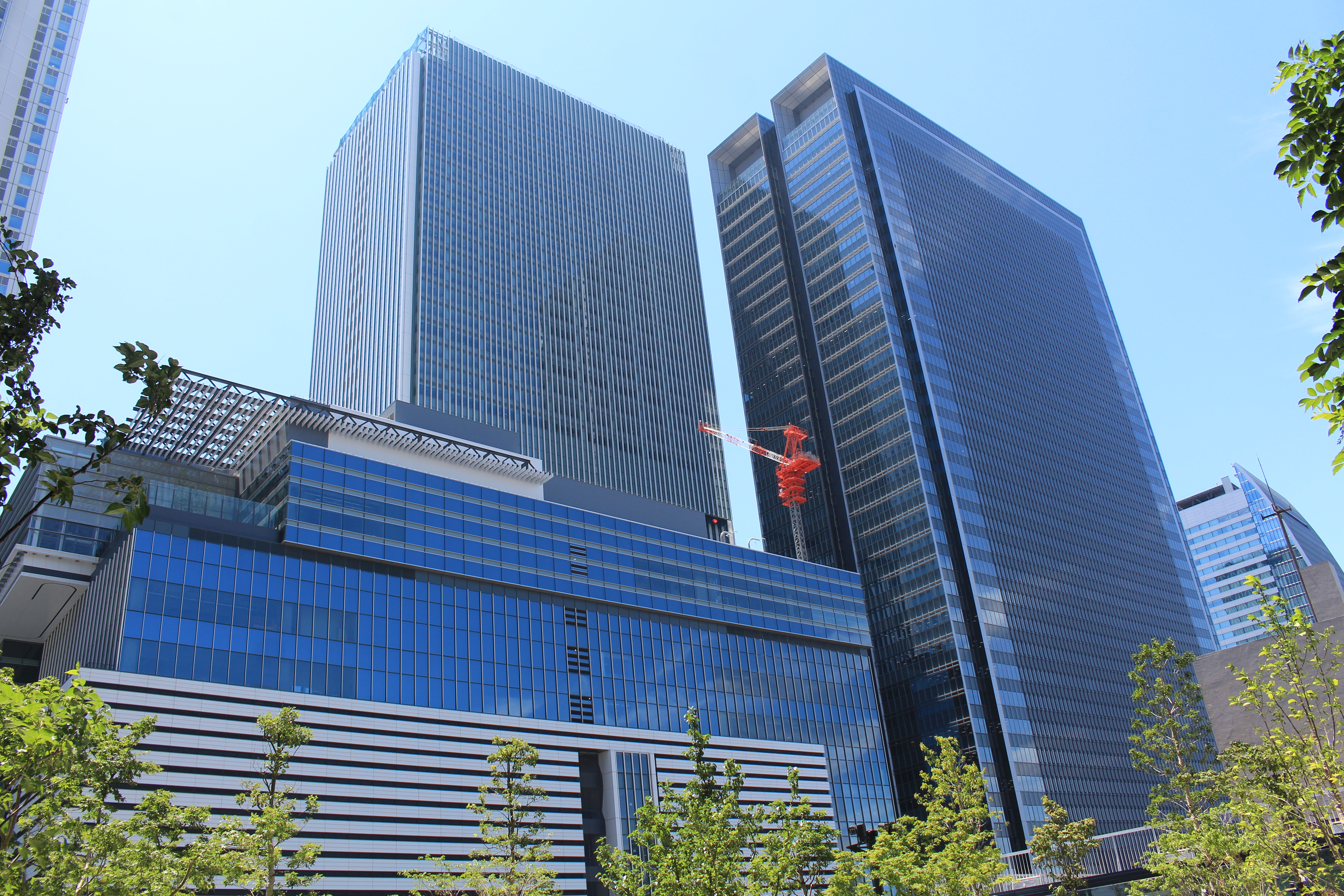
JP Tower Nagoya (Nagoya central Post office)

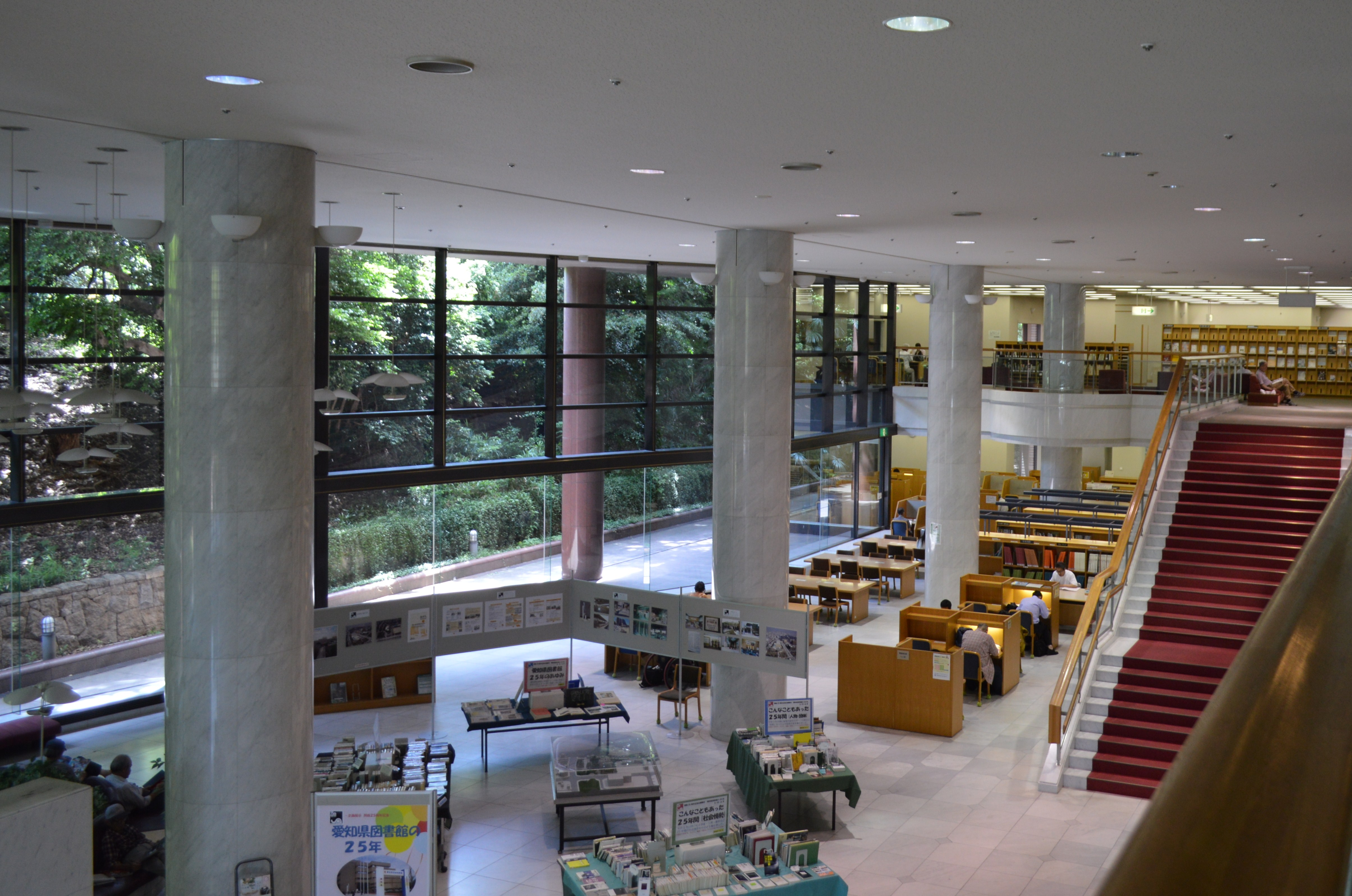
Aichi Prefectural Library

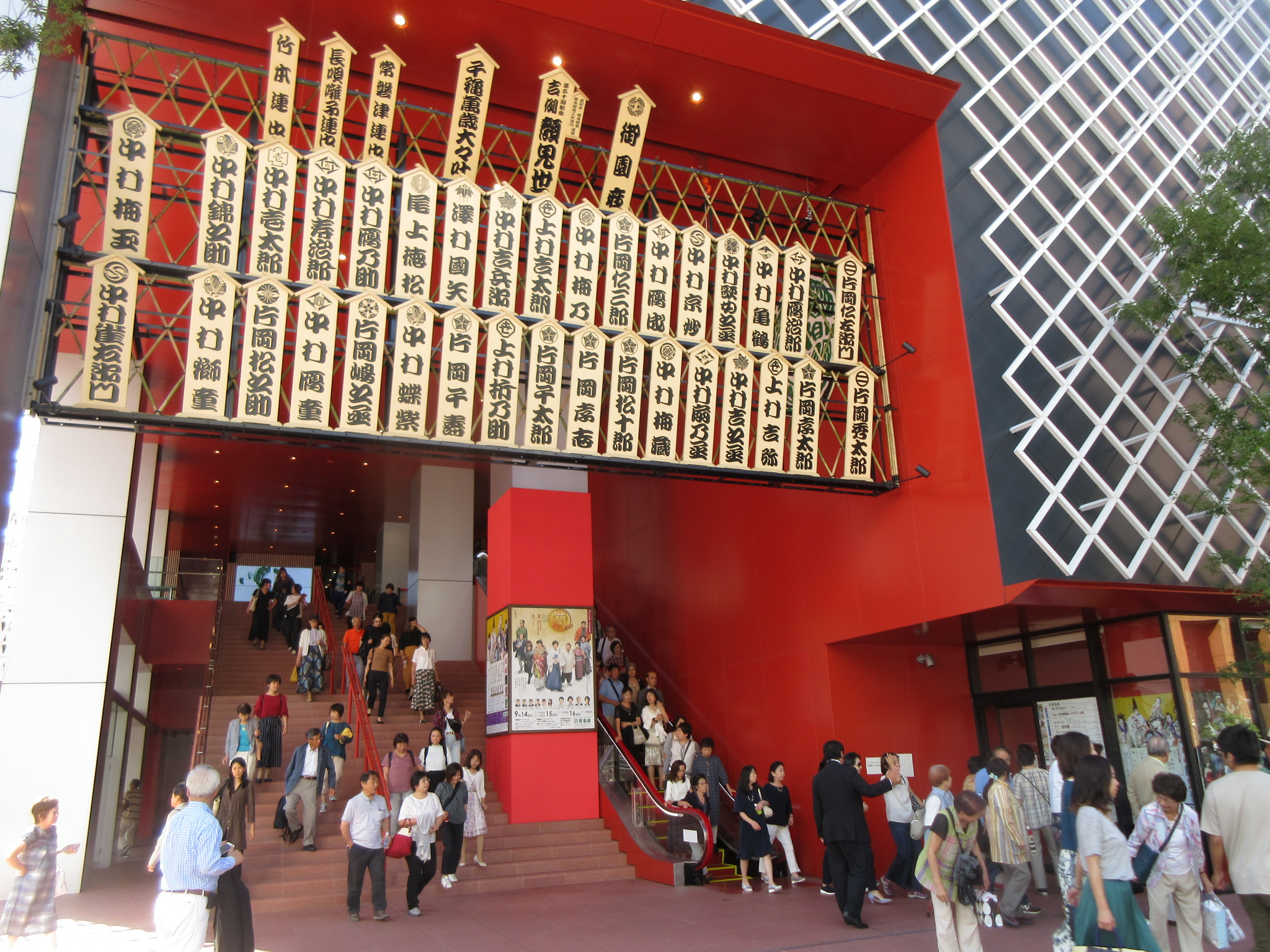
Misono-za

== Sister cities ==
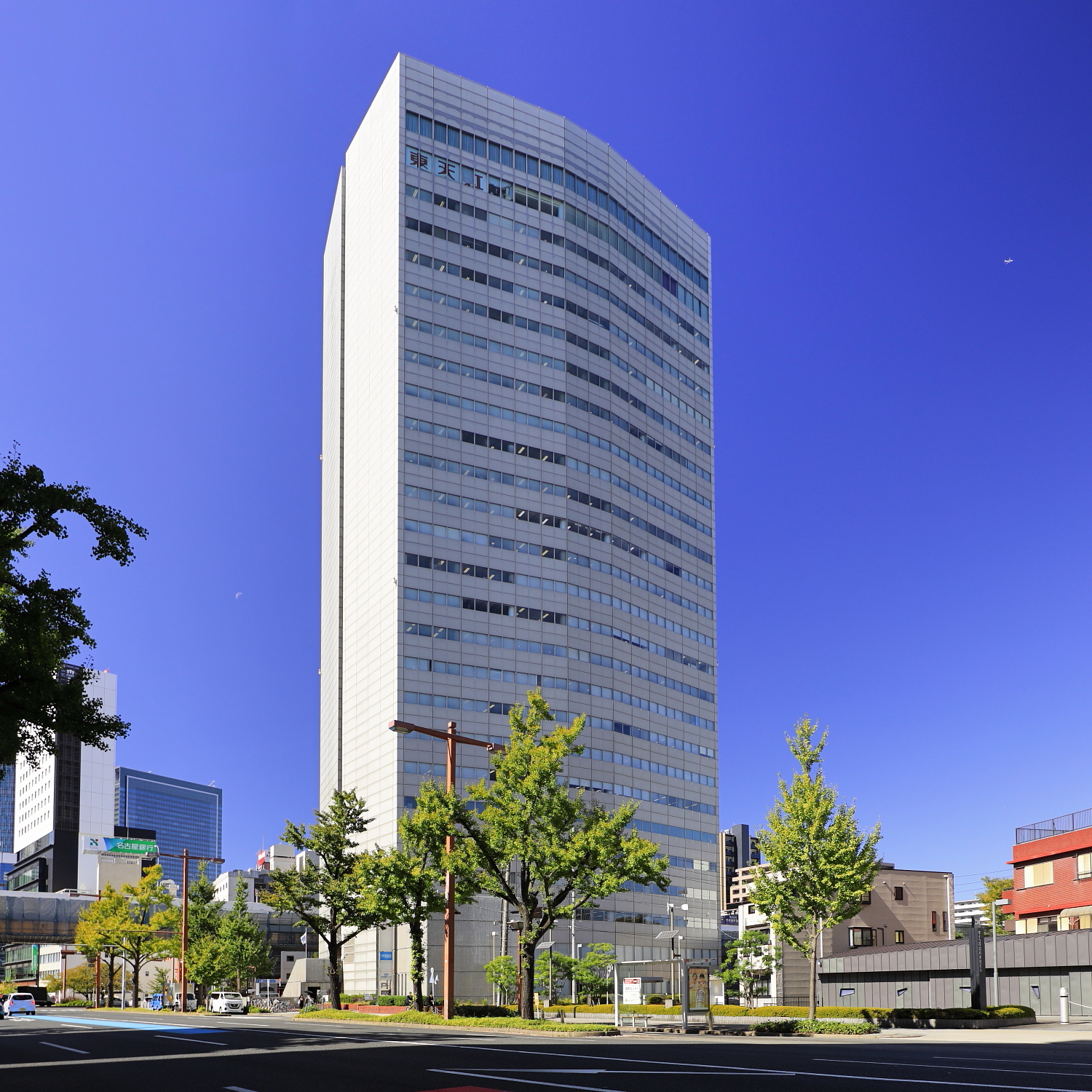
Nagoya International Center

The Nagoya International Center promotes international exchange in the local community. It houses the U.S. Consulate and the United Nations Centre for Regional Development (UNCRD).

Nagoya is twinned with:

=== International ===
Sister cities

City	Country	State	Since
Los Angeles	United States	California	1 April 1959
Houston	United States	Texas	20 May 1963
Mexico City	Mexico	Mexico City	16 February 1978
Nanjing	China	Jiangsu	21 December 1978
Sydney	Australia	New South Wales	16 September 1980
Turin	Italy	Piedmont	27 May 2005
Reims	France	Grand Est	20 October 2017
Vilnius	Lithuania	Dzūkija	4 September 2026

The sister city relationship with Nanjing, China was suspended in February 2012, following public comments by Nagoya mayor Takashi Kawamura denying the Nanjing Massacre.

Partner cities

City	Country	State	Since
Taichung	Taiwan	Special municipality	25 October 2019
Tashkent	Uzbekistan	Shahar	18 December 2019
Melbourne	Australia	Victoria	TBA

=== National ===
Partner city

City	Prefecture	region	Since
Toyota	(Aichi Prefecture) Aichi	Chūbu region	24 October 1986
Nakatsugawa	(Gifu Prefecture) Gifu	Chūbu region	24 October 1986
Rikuzentakata	(Iwate Prefecture) Iwate	Tōhoku region	28 October 2014

=== Sister airport ===
Nagoya Airfield's sister airport is:

- Grant County International Airport, WA, United States (2016)

== Economy ==
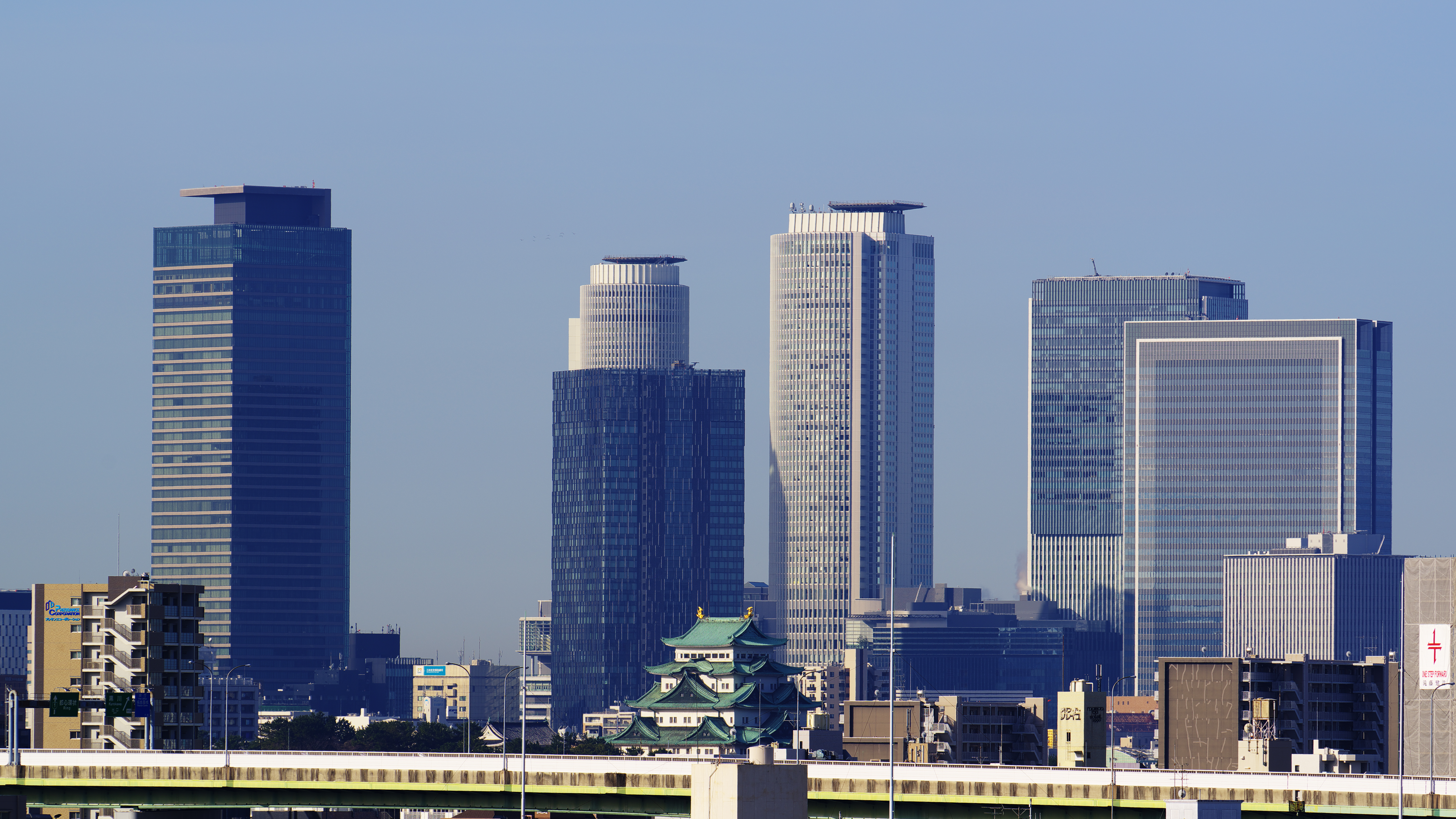
Nagoya Castle and the Meieki district with skyscrapers

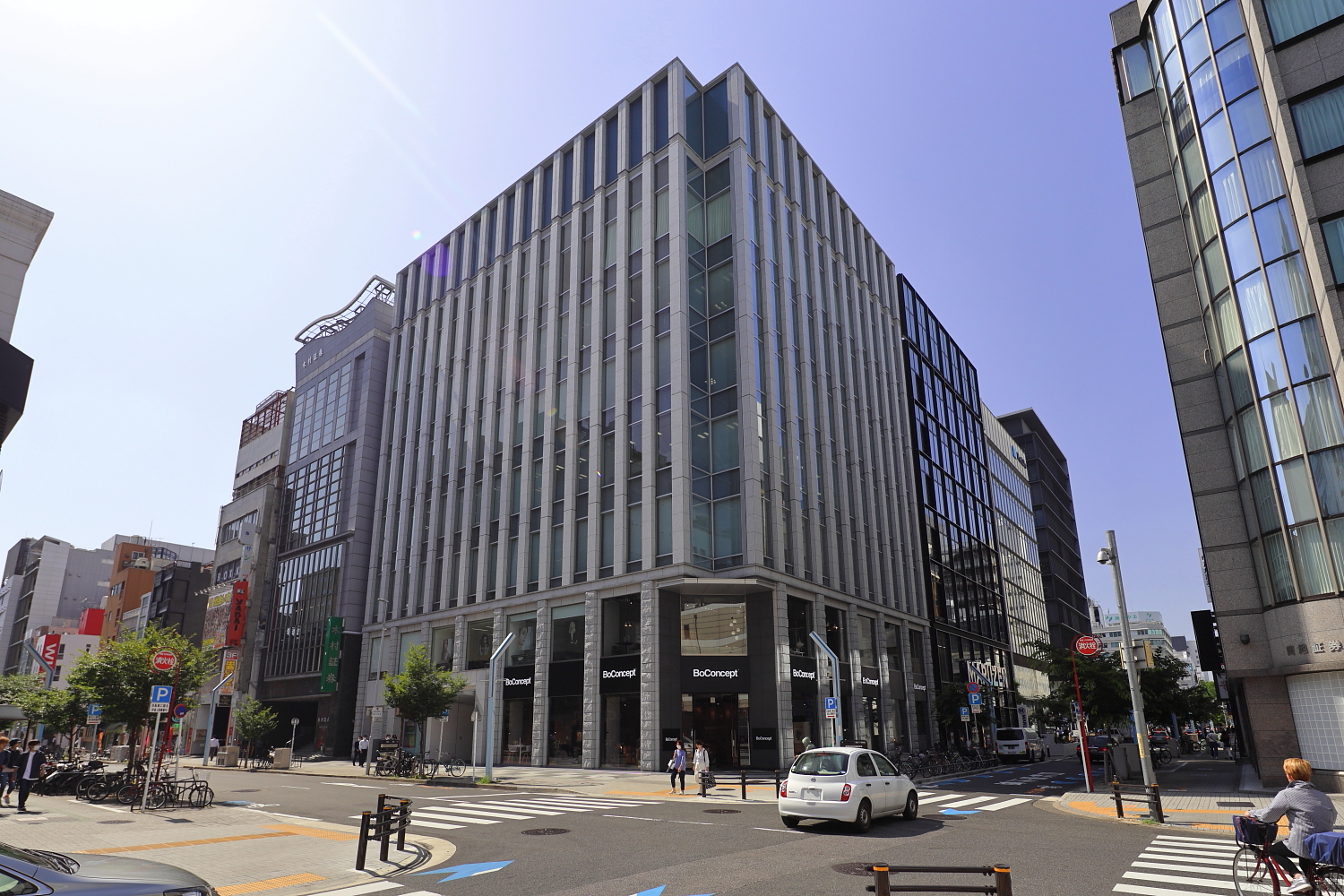
The Nagoya Stock Exchange in the Isemachi district

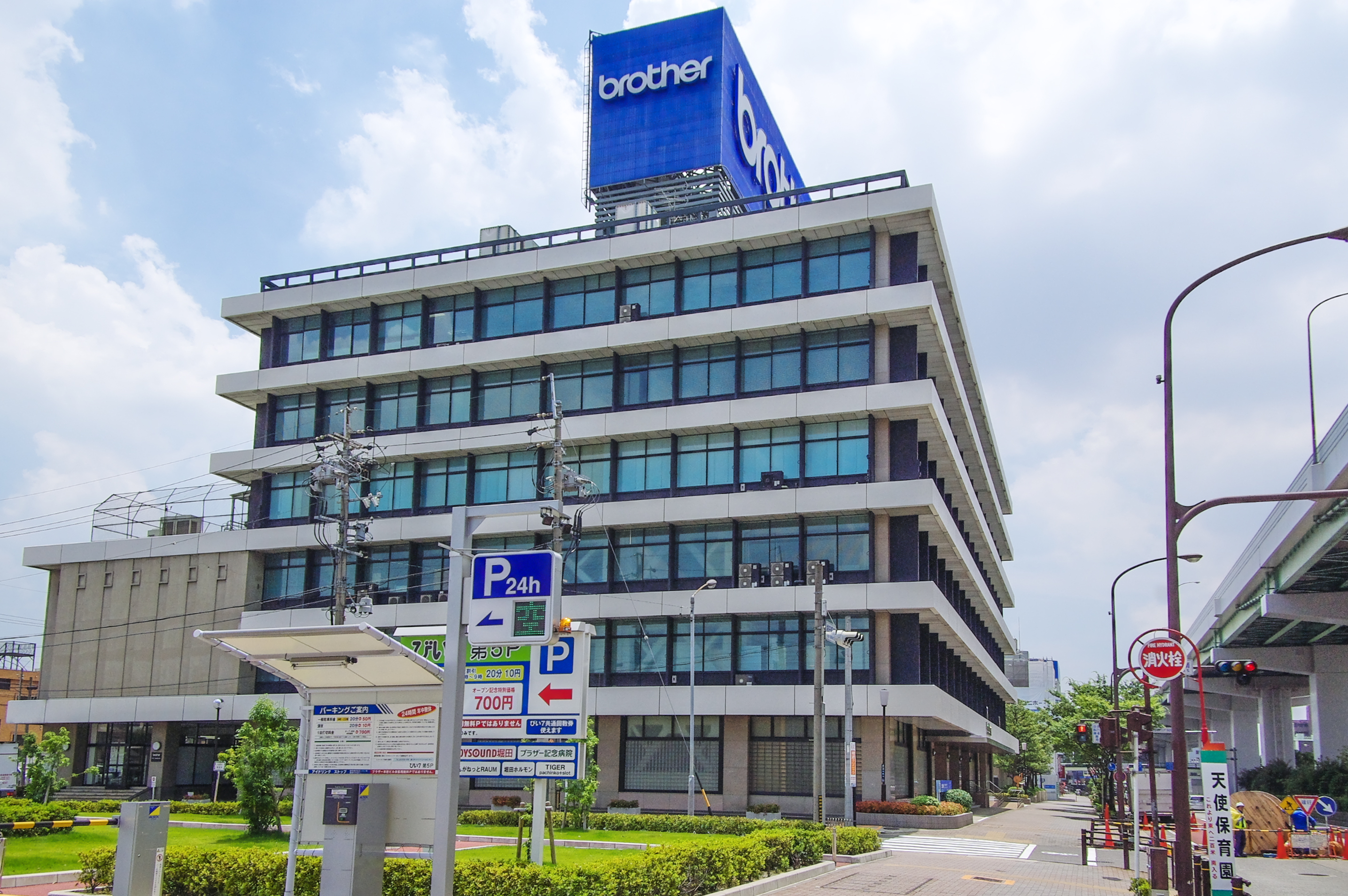
Brother Industries

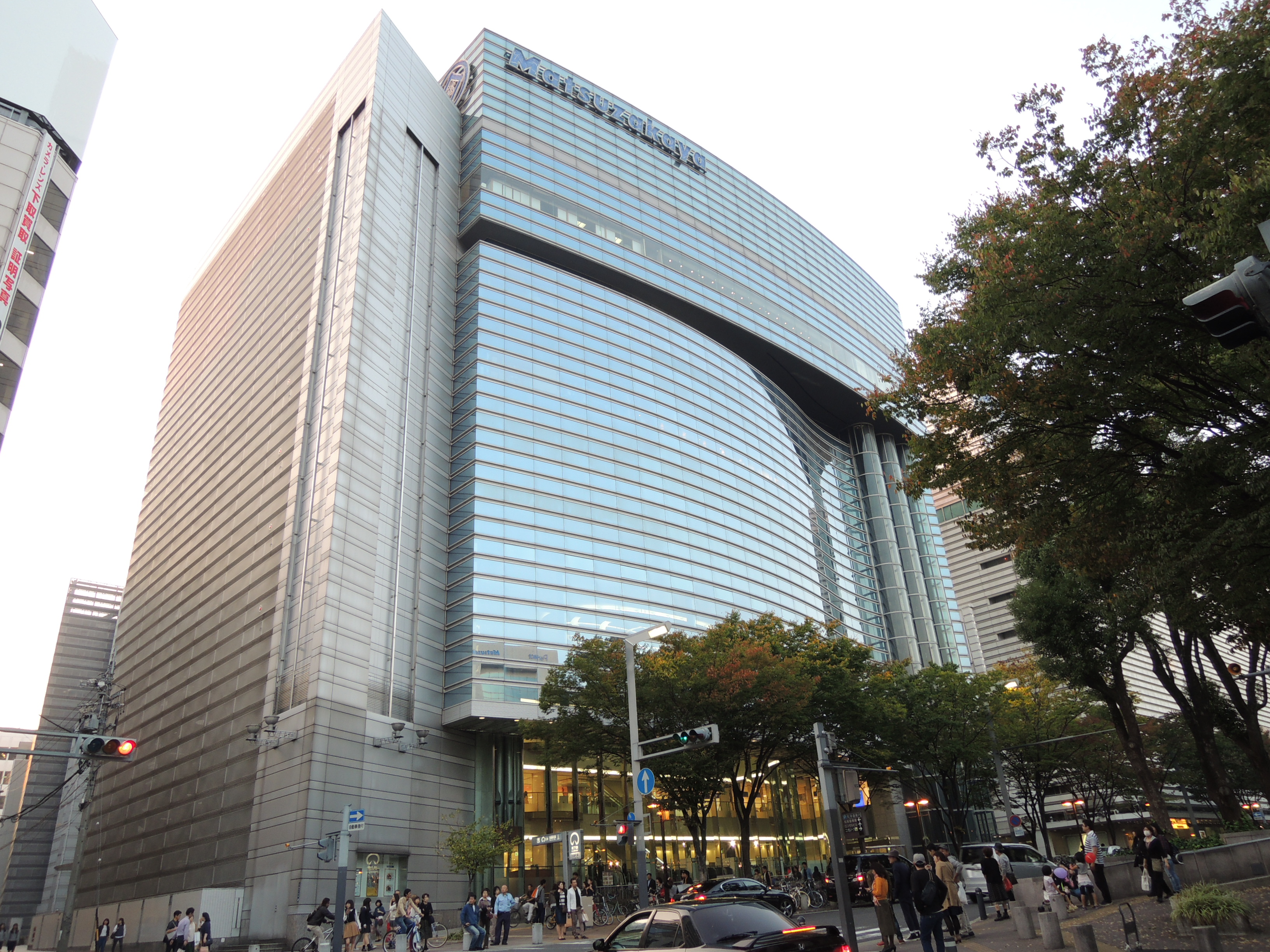
Matsuzakaya department store

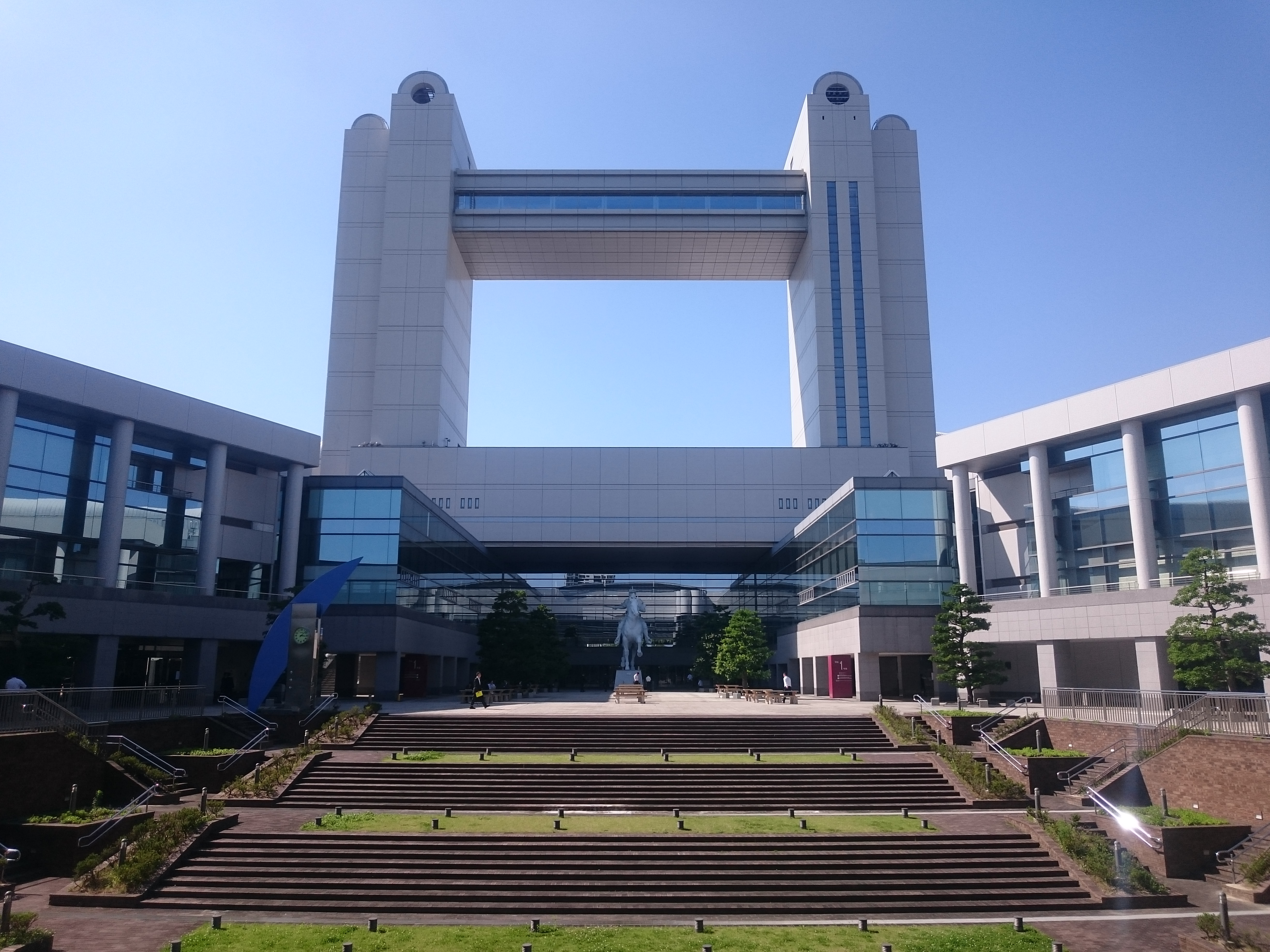
Nagoya Congress Center

Nagoya is the center of Greater Nagoya, which earned nearly 70 percent of Japan's 2003 trade surplus.

=== Automotive industry ===
Nagoya's main industry is automotive. Toyota's luxury brand Lexus, Denso, Aisin Seiki Co., Toyota Industries, JTEKT and Toyota Boshoku have their headquarters in or near Nagoya. Mitsubishi Motors has an R&D division in the suburb of Okazaki. Major component suppliers such as Magna International and PPG also have a strong presence here. Spark plug maker NGK and Nippon Sharyo, known for manufacturing rolling stock including the Shinkansen are headquartered there.

=== Aviation industry ===
The aviation history has historically been of importance since the industrialization. During the Pacific War the Mitsubishi A6M Zero fighter was constructed in Nagoya. The aviation tradition continues with Mitsubishi Aircraft Corporation headquartered in the Nagoya Airfield's terminal building in Komaki. The Mitsubishi Regional Jet (MRJ) aircraft is produced at a factory adjacent to the airport.

The MRJ is a partnership between majority owner Mitsubishi Heavy Industries and Toyota with design assistance from Toyota affiliate Subaru Corporation, already a manufacturer of aircraft. It is the first airliner designed and produced in Japan since the NAMC YS-11 of the 1960s. The MRJ's first flight was in November 2015.

=== Ceramics ===
Japanese pottery and porcelain has a long tradition due to suitable clay being available in Owari Province. Before and during the Edo period there were two main kilns in the region: Seto and Tokoname. In Nagoya Castle a type of oniwa-yaki (literally "garden ware") called Ofukei ware was produced by the feudal lord's court. Almost every feudal lord had his own oniwa-yaki, also to have gifts made.

In the town itself Toyoraku ware and Sasashima ware Japanese tea utensils were made with refined tastes. Ofukei ware started under the first Owari lord Tokugawa Yoshinao and was interrupted once, but continued on until the end of the Edo period. It became widely known in Japan. The lord's taste in ceramics was imitated by other Owari samurai, such as Hirasawa Kurō and Masaki Sōzaburō, who made their own pieces.

Toyoraku ware continued on until the Taishō era under the 8th generation. Colourful pieces and gorgeous tea utensils were highly valued. Sasashima ware also experienced its heyday during this time. Colourful and soft ceramic items such as sake and tea utensils and objects were produced and intently collected.

An early type of manufactured production was the blue-and-white Kawana ware. With the advent of industrialization during the Meiji era of the late 19th century, some export wares were produced. Industrial-scale export porcelain was made by old Noritake, also Nagoya E-tsuke (名古屋絵付) became popular.

Production of industrial ceramics continues to be an important economic factor with companies such as INAX, NGK, and NGK Insulators.

=== Meetings, Incentives, Conferences, Exhibitions (MICE) ===
The city has an increasing role in the meetings, incentives, conferencing, exhibitions (MICE) industry. It hosted in 1989 the World Design Expo (世界デザイン博覧会) for which the Nagoya Congress Center was constructed. It hosted the Expo 2005 and the Nagoya Protocol conference in 2010, as well as the G20 Aichi-Nagoya Foreign Ministers' Meeting in November 2019, which was held at the Nagoya Kanko Hotel and Kawabun.

=== Technology ===
Mechanized puppets, called "karakuri ningyō", are a traditional craft from the area. Robot technology is another rapidly developing industry.

A materials engineering industry is developing.

Brother Industries, which is known for office electronics such as multifunction printers is based in Nagoya, as is Hoshizaki Electric, which is known for commercial ice machines and refrigeration equipment. Many small machine tool and electronics companies are also based in the area.

The World Expo 2005, also known as Aichi Expo, was held near Nagoya in the neighboring cities of Nagakute and Seto from 25 March to 25 September 2005.

=== Retail ===
Retail is of importance in the city. Traditional department stores with roots in Nagoya are Matsuzakaya, Maruei and the Meitetsu Department Store. Oriental Nakamura was bought by Mitsukoshi from Tokyo in 1977.

=== Arts and crafts ===
The Owari province was historically well known for the cloisonné art form. The Ando Cloisonné Company continues the long tradition.

=== Others ===
The confectionery company Marukawa is well known.

Nagoya has venues for conferences and congresses such as the Nagoya Congress Center and the Nagoya International Exhibition Hall.

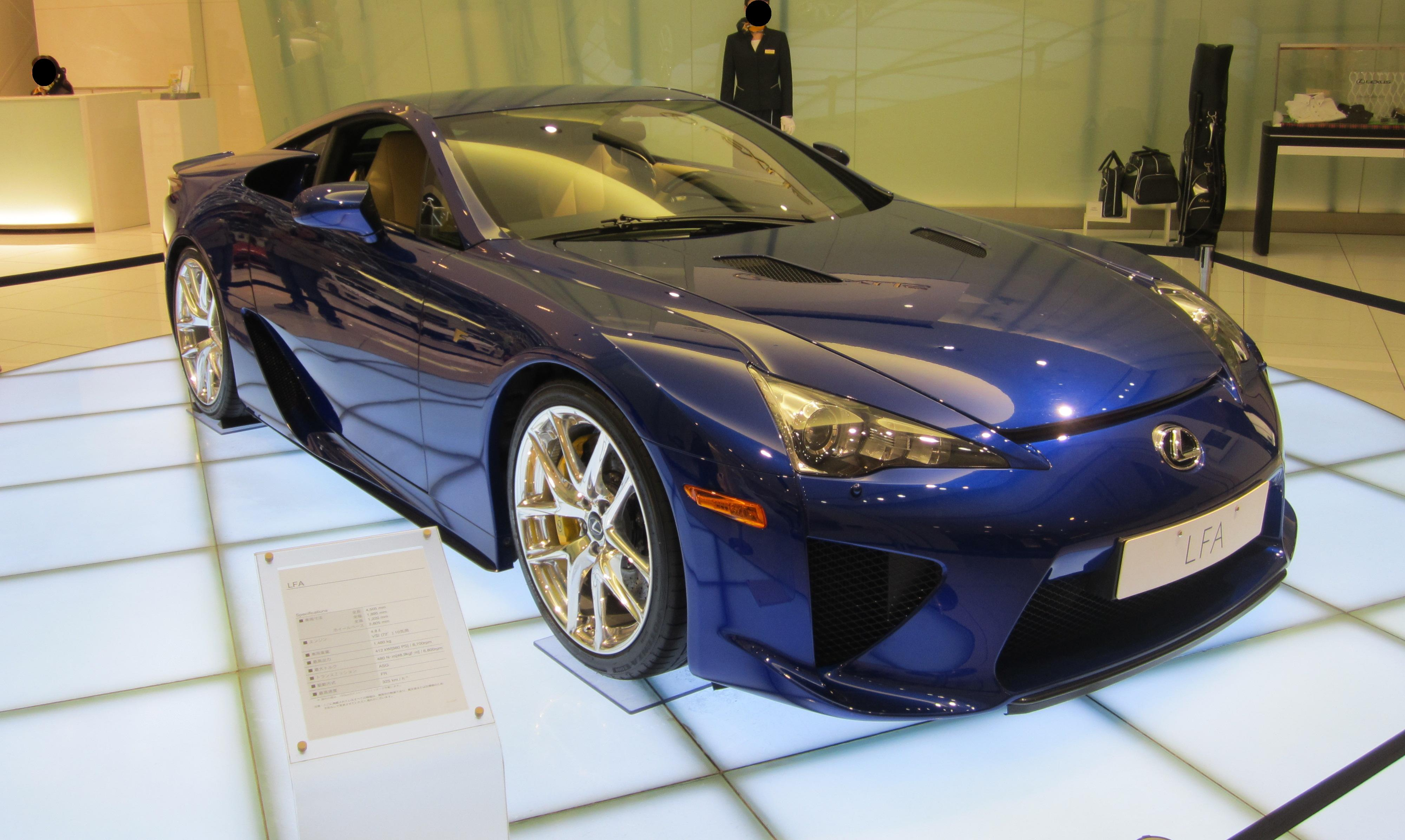
A Lexus LFA in Midland Square

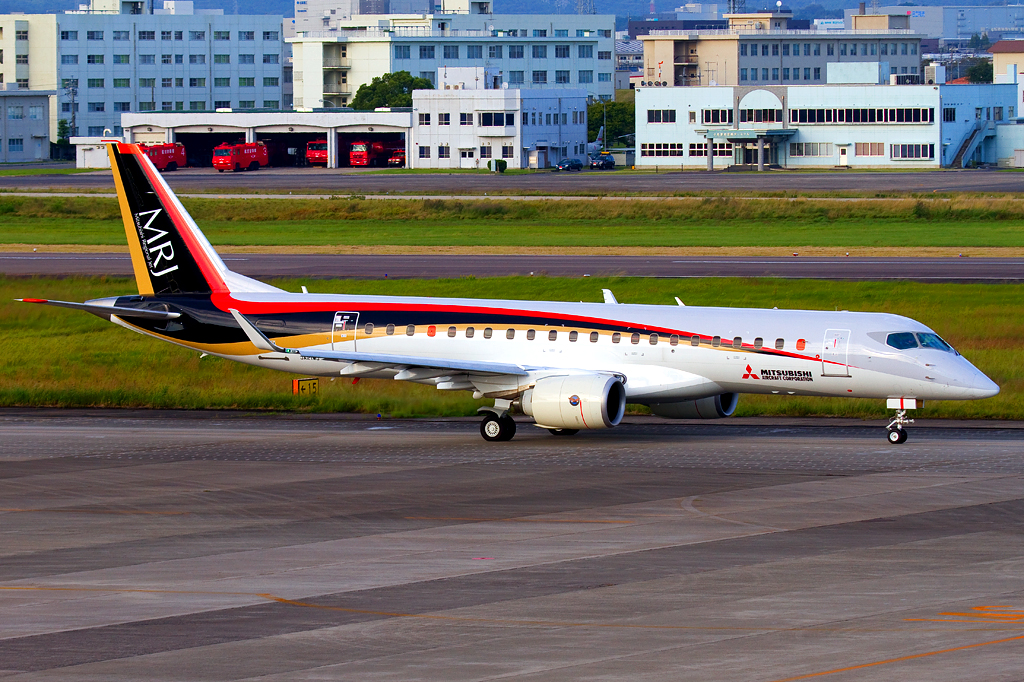
The first MRJ prototype at Nagoya Airfield in Komaki

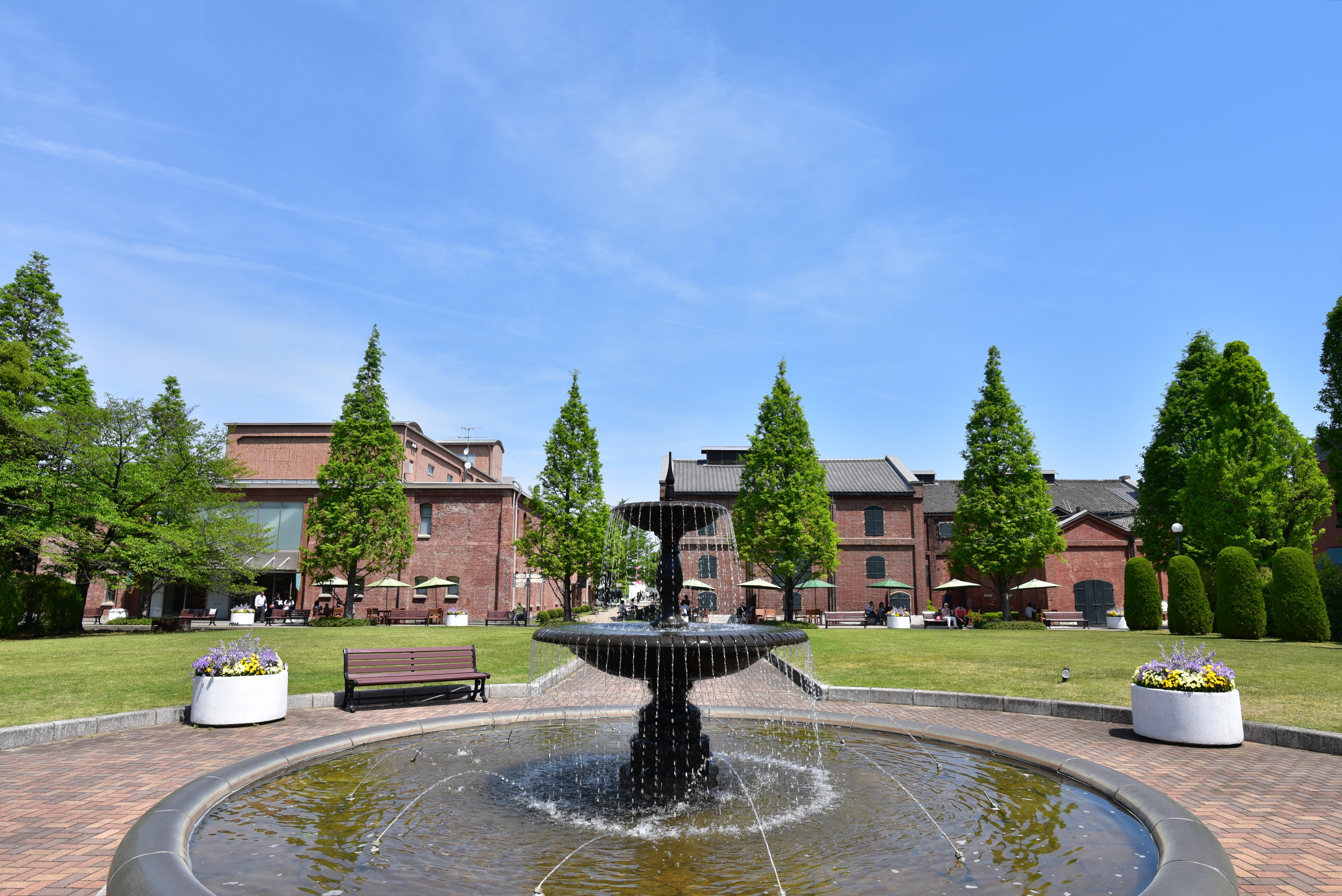
The Noritake tableware company

== Education ==
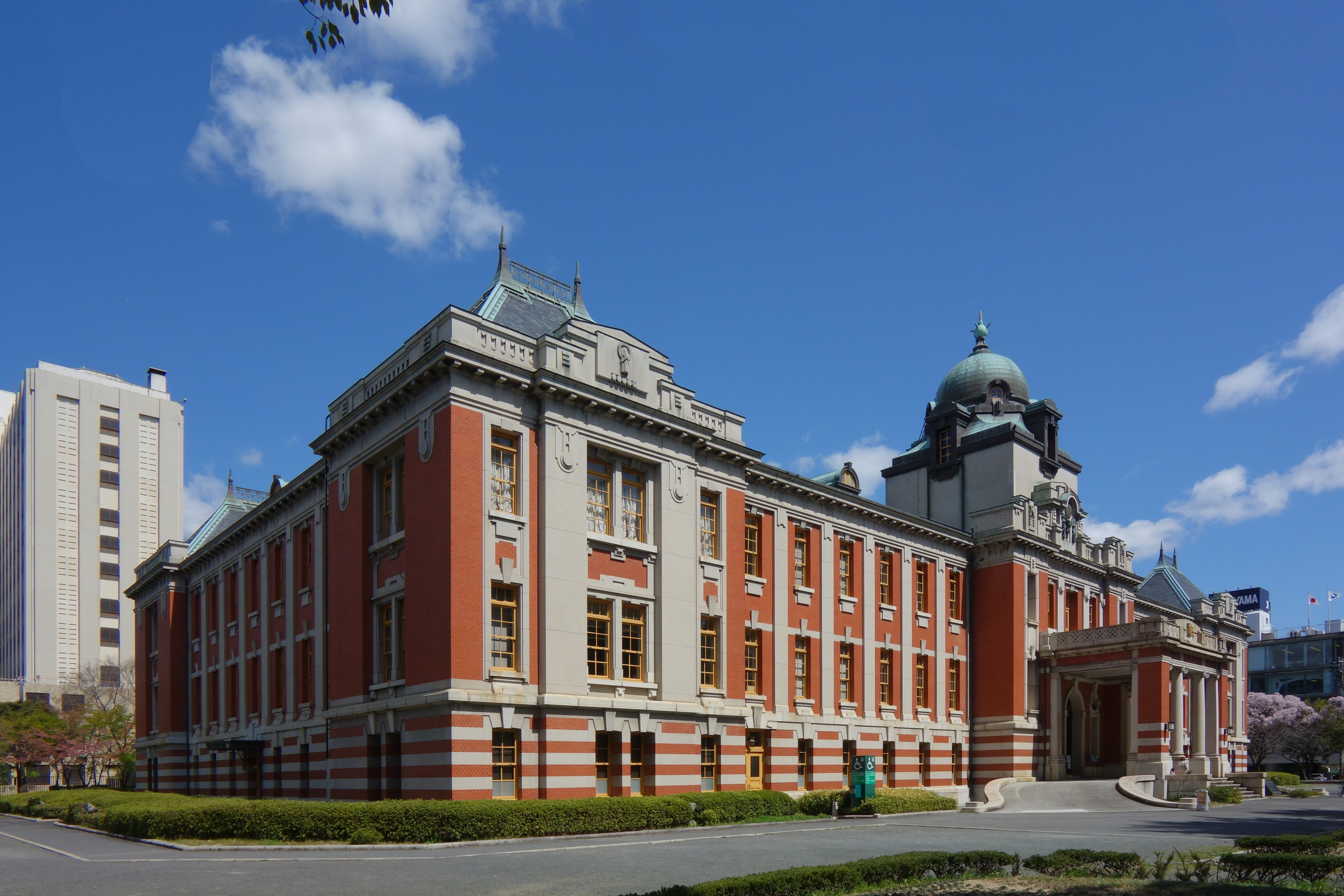
The old Nagoya Court of Appeals building, today the city archive

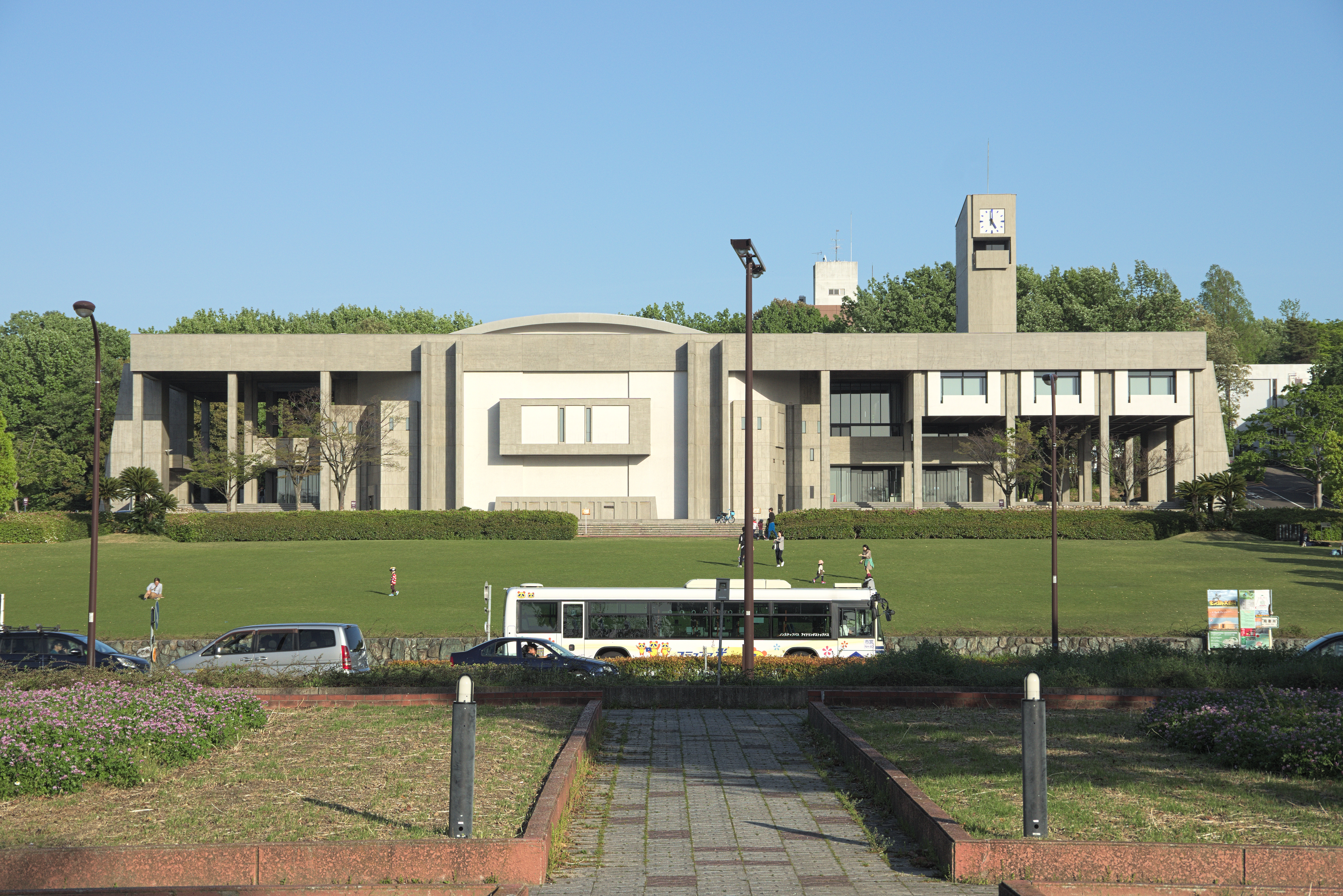
The Nagoya University campus in Higashiyama. The university has produced seven Nobel Prize laureates in science.

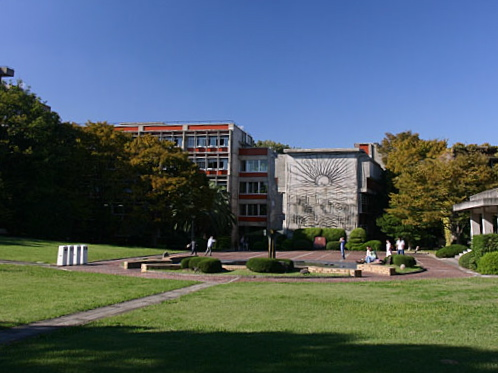
Nanzan University main campus, designed by renowned architect Antonin Raymond in the 1960s

Nagoya has mostly state-run primary and secondary schools. The area in the city limits includes international schools such as the Nagoya International School and Colégio Brasil Japão Prof. Shinoda Brazilian school.

=== Universities ===
State and private colleges and universities are primarily located in the eastern area. Some Western-style institutions were founded early in the Meiji era, with more opening during the Taishō and Shōwa eras. Nagoya University was set up in 1871 as a medical school and has produced seven Nobel Prize laureates in science. Nanzan University was established by the Roman Catholic Society of the Divine Word in 1932 as a high school and expanded to include Nanzan Junior College and the Nanzan Institute for Religion and Culture. The main campus was designed in the 1960s by the renowned architect Antonin Raymond. Some universities specialise in engineering and technology, such as Nagoya University Engineering school, Nagoya Institute of Technology and Toyota Technological Institute. These universities receive support and grants from companies such as Toyota.

Other colleges and universities include: Aichi Prefectural College of Nursing & Health, Aichi Shukutoku Junior College, Aichi Toho University, Chukyo University, Daido University, Doho University, Kinjo Gakuin University, Kinjo Gakuin University Junior College, Meijo University, Nagoya City University, Nagoya College of Music, Nagoya Future Culture College, Nagoya Gakuin University, Nagoya Management Junior College, Nagoya Women's University, St. Mary's College, Nagoya, Sugiyama Jogakuen University, Sugiyama Jogakuen University Junior College, Tokai Gakuen Women's College. Various universities from outside Nagoya have set up satellite campuses, such as Tokyo University of Social Welfare.

The Hōsa Library dates to the 17th century and houses 110,000 items, including books of classic literature such as historic editions of The Tale of Genji that are an heirloom of the Owari Tokugawa and were bequeathed to the city. The Nagoya City Archives store a large collection of documents and books. Tsuruma Central Library is a public library and Nagoya International Center has a collection of foreign-language books.

National Universities

- Nagoya University (名古屋大学, Nagoya Daigaku)
- Nagoya Institute of Technology (名古屋工業大学, Nagoya Kōgyō Daigaku)

Prefectural University

- Aichi Prefectural College of Nursing & Health (愛知県立看護大学, Aichi kenritsu kango Daigaku)
- Nagoya City University (名古屋市立大学, Nagoya shiritsu Daigaku)

Private Universities

- Aichi University (愛知大学, Aichi Daigaku)
- Aichi Gakuin University (愛知学院大学, Aichi gakuin Daigaku)
- Aichi Shukutoku University (愛知淑徳大学, Aichi Shukutoku Daigaku)
- Aichi Toho University (愛知東邦大学, Aichi Toho Daigaku)
- Chukyo University (中京大学, Chūkyō Daigaku)
- Daido University (大同大学, Daidō Daigaku)
- Doho University (同朋大学, Dōhō Daigaku)
- Kinjo Gakuin University (金城学院大学, Kinjō Gakuin Daigaku)
- Meijo University (名城大学, Meijō Daigaku)
- Nagoya College of Music (名古屋音楽大学, Nagoya Ongaku Daigaku)
- Nagoya Gakuin University (名古屋学院大学, Nagoya Gakuin Daigaku)
- Nagoya Women's University (名古屋女子大学, Nagoya Joshi Daigaku)
- Nanzan University (南山大学, Nanzan Daigaku)
- Sugiyama Jogakuen University (椙山女学園大学, Sugiyama Jogakuen Daigaku)
- Tokyo University of Social Welfare (東京福祉大学, Tokyo Fukushi Daigaku)
- Tokai Gakuen University (東海学園大学, Tokai Gakuen Daigaku)
- Toyota Technological Institute (豊田工業大学, Toyota Kōgyō Daigaku)

== Transport ==
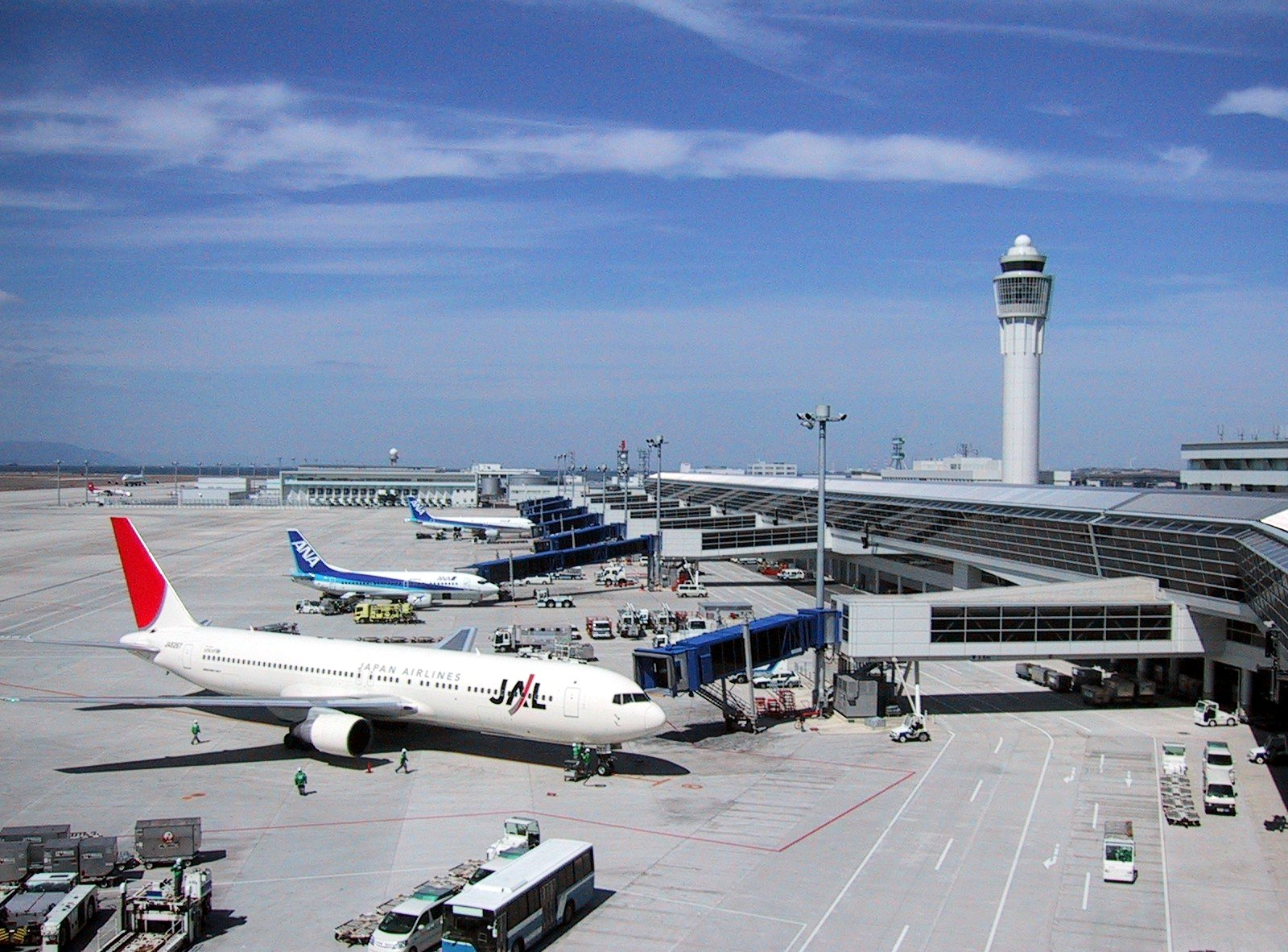
Chubu Centrair International Airport, constructed on an artificial island

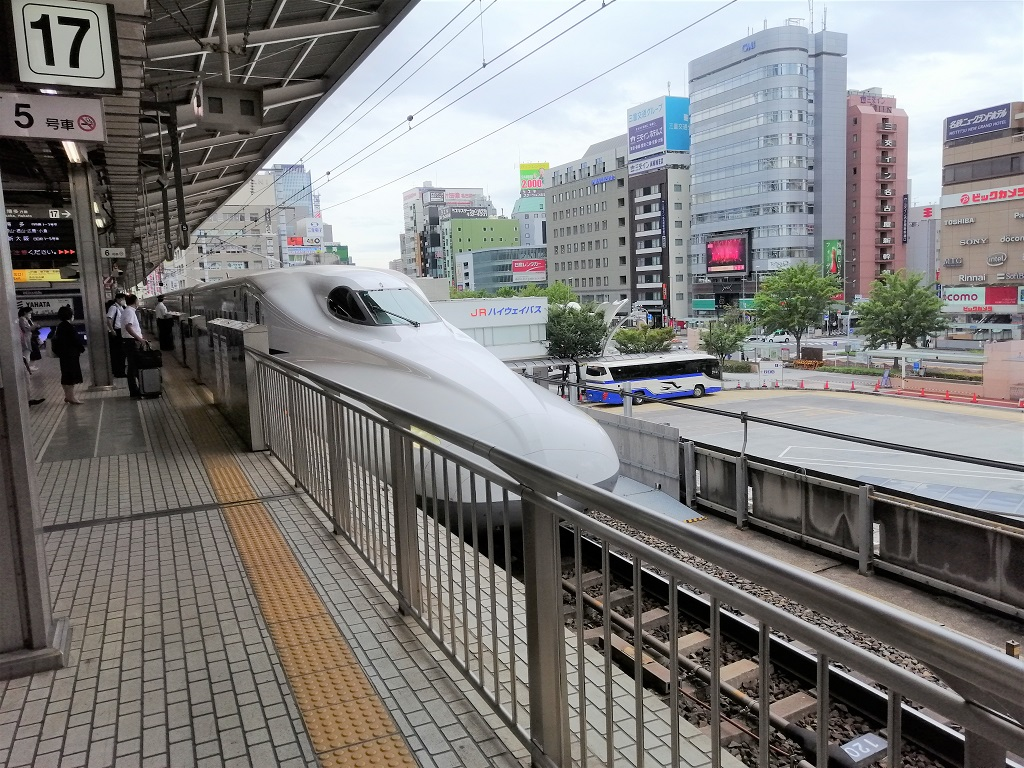
Tokaido Shinkansen

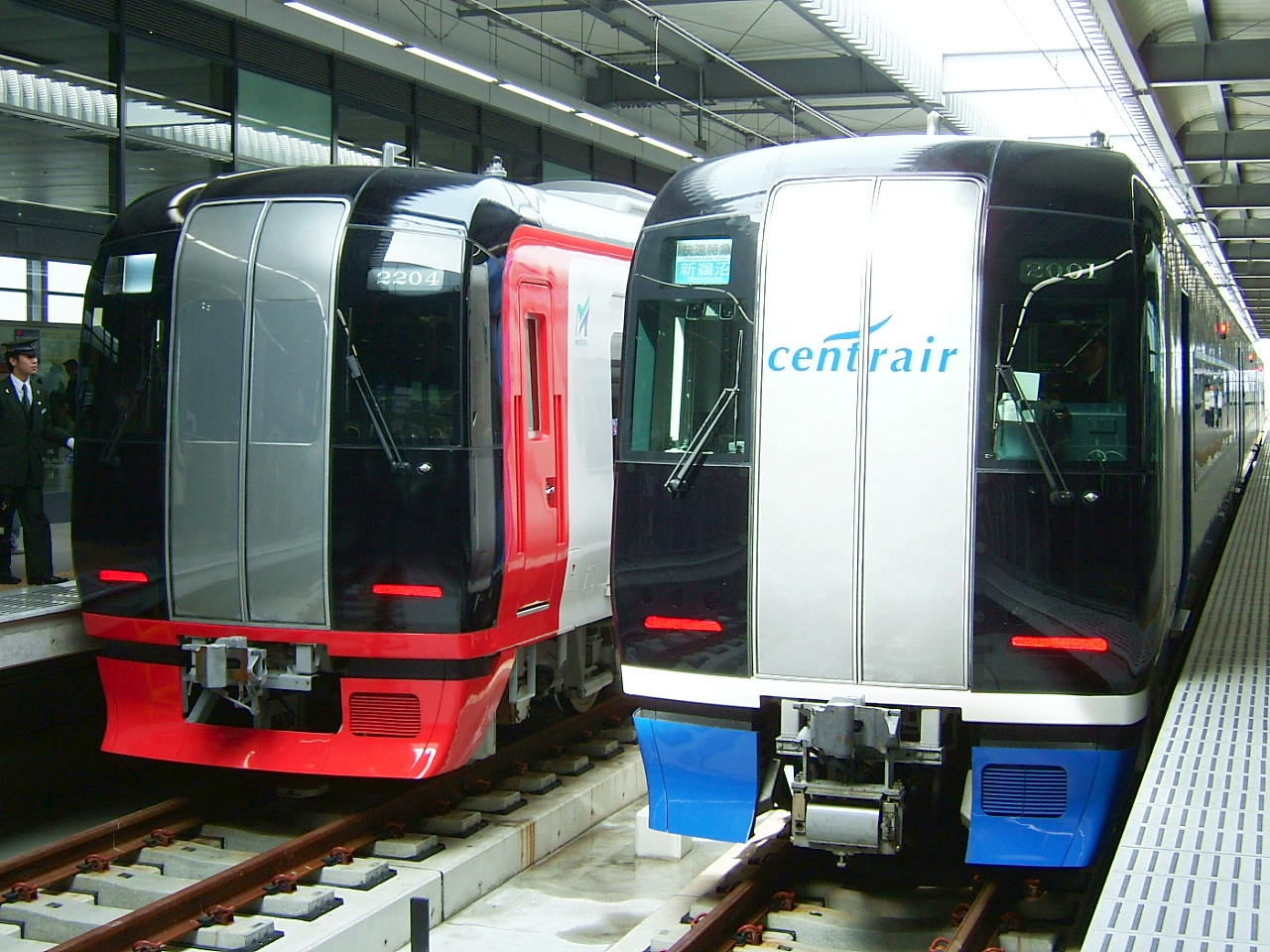
Meitetsu's μSky Limited Express

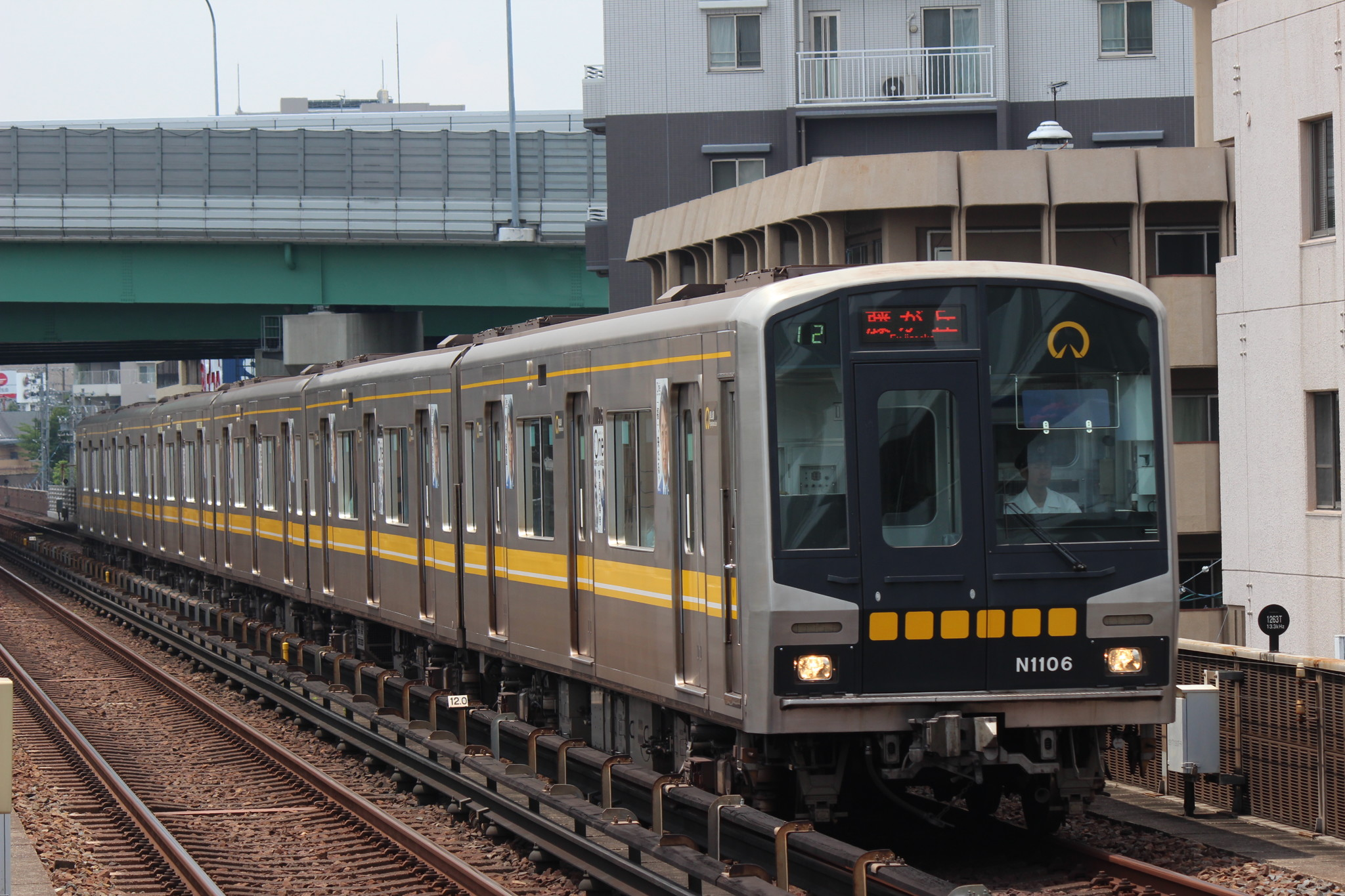
Nagoya Subway

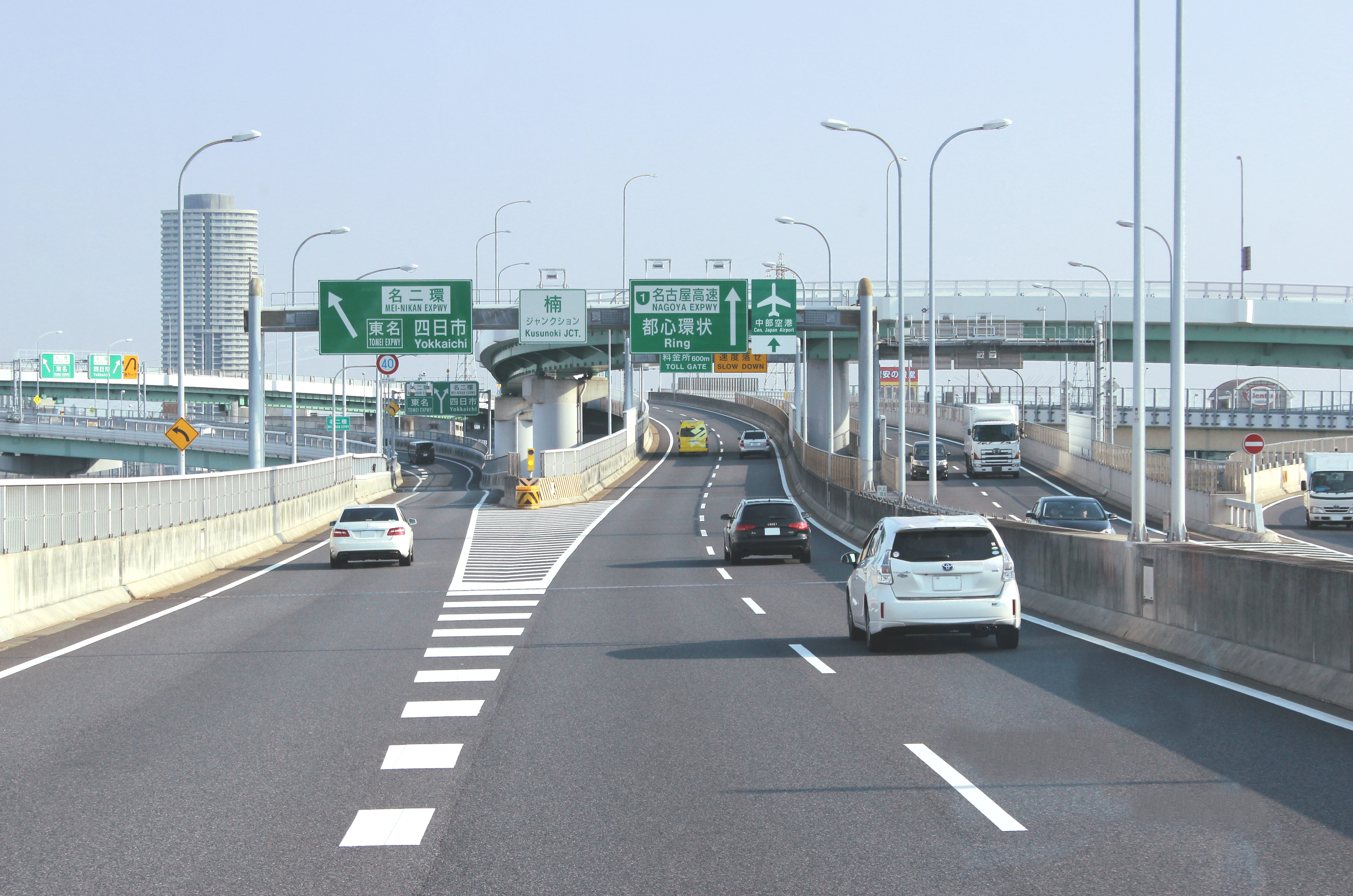
Nagoya Expressway & Mei-Nikan Expressway（Kusunoki JCT）

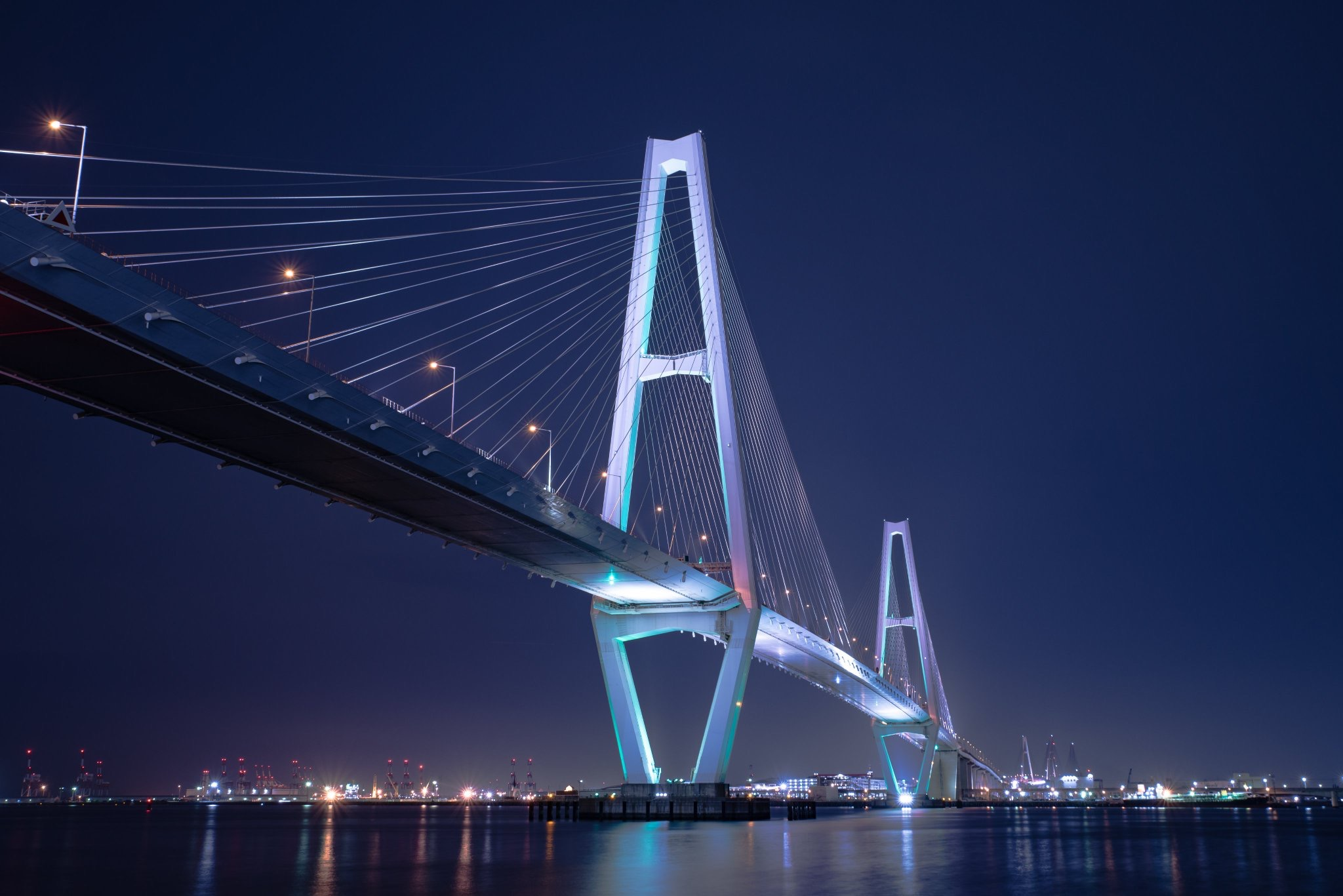
Meiko Triton Bridge

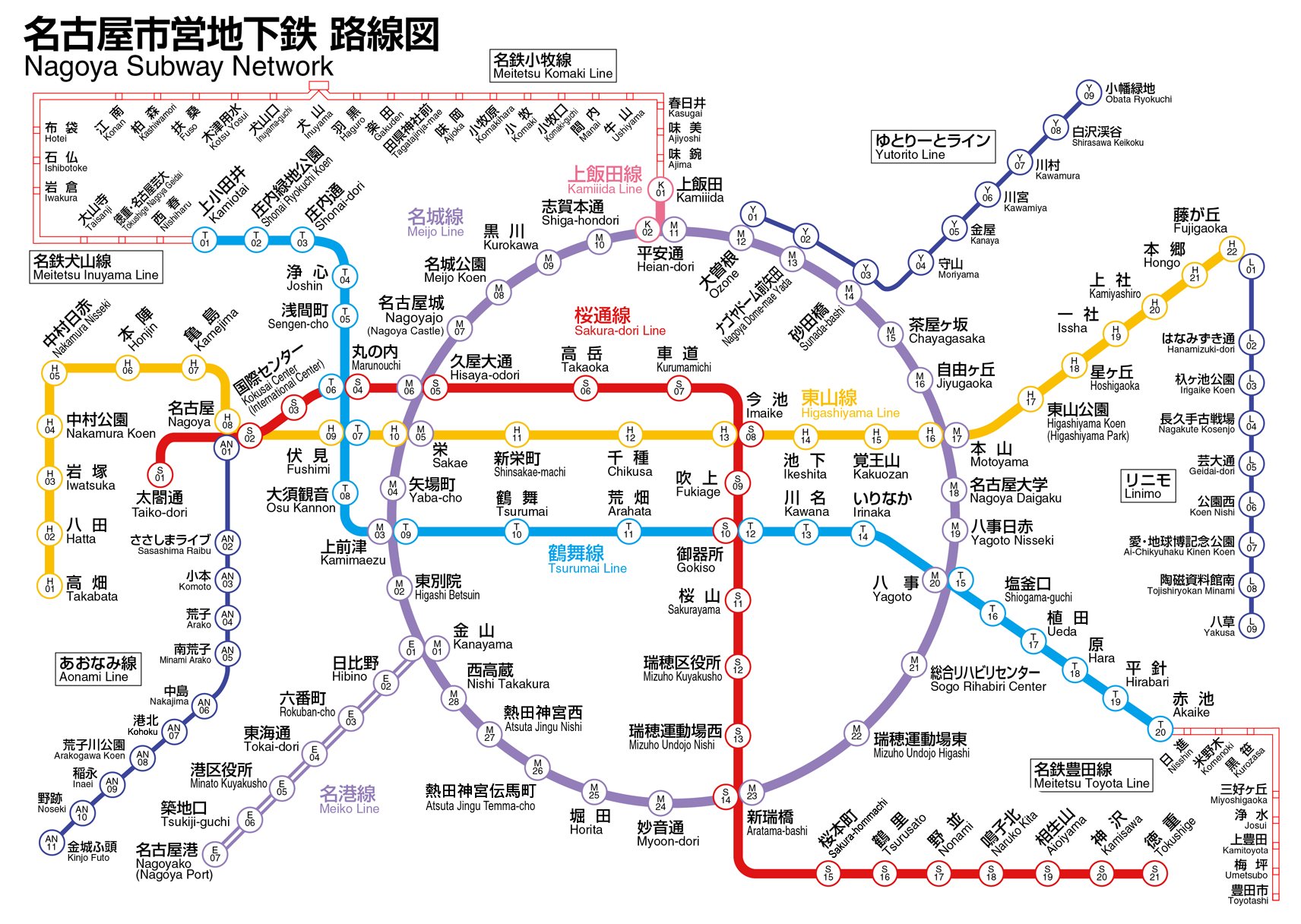
Map of Nagoya Subway system (does not include JR Central lines)

=== Airways ===
==== Airport ====
Nagoya is served by Chubu Centrair International Airport (NGO), built on an artificial island in Tokoname. The airport has international flights and a high volume of domestic flights.

A second airport is Nagoya Airfield (Komaki Airport, NKM) near the city's boundary with Komaki and Kasugai. On 17 February 2005, Nagoya Airport's commercial international flights moved to Centrair Airport. Nagoya Airfield is now used for general aviation and as an airbase and is the main Fuji Dream Airlines hub.

=== Railways ===
Nagoya Station, the world's largest train station by floor area, is on the Tōkaidō Shinkansen line, the Tōkaidō Main Line, and the Chūō Main Line, among others. JR Central, which operates the Tōkaidō Shinkansen, has its headquarters there. Meitetsu is also based in Nagoya, and along with Kintetsu provides regional rail service to the Tōkai and Kansai regions.

==== High-speed rail ====
JR Central

- Tōkaidō Shinkansen line

==== Conventional lines ====
JR Central

- Tōkaidō Main Line
- Chūō Main Line
- Kansai Main Line

==== Subways ====
Nagoya Subway provides urban transit service.

=== Buses ===
Several private and public bus companies operate with routes throughout the region. Most local bus routes complement existing rail service to form an effective intermodal transit network.

- Nagoya Municipal Bus
- Meitetsu Bus
- Mie Kotsu

=== Roads ===
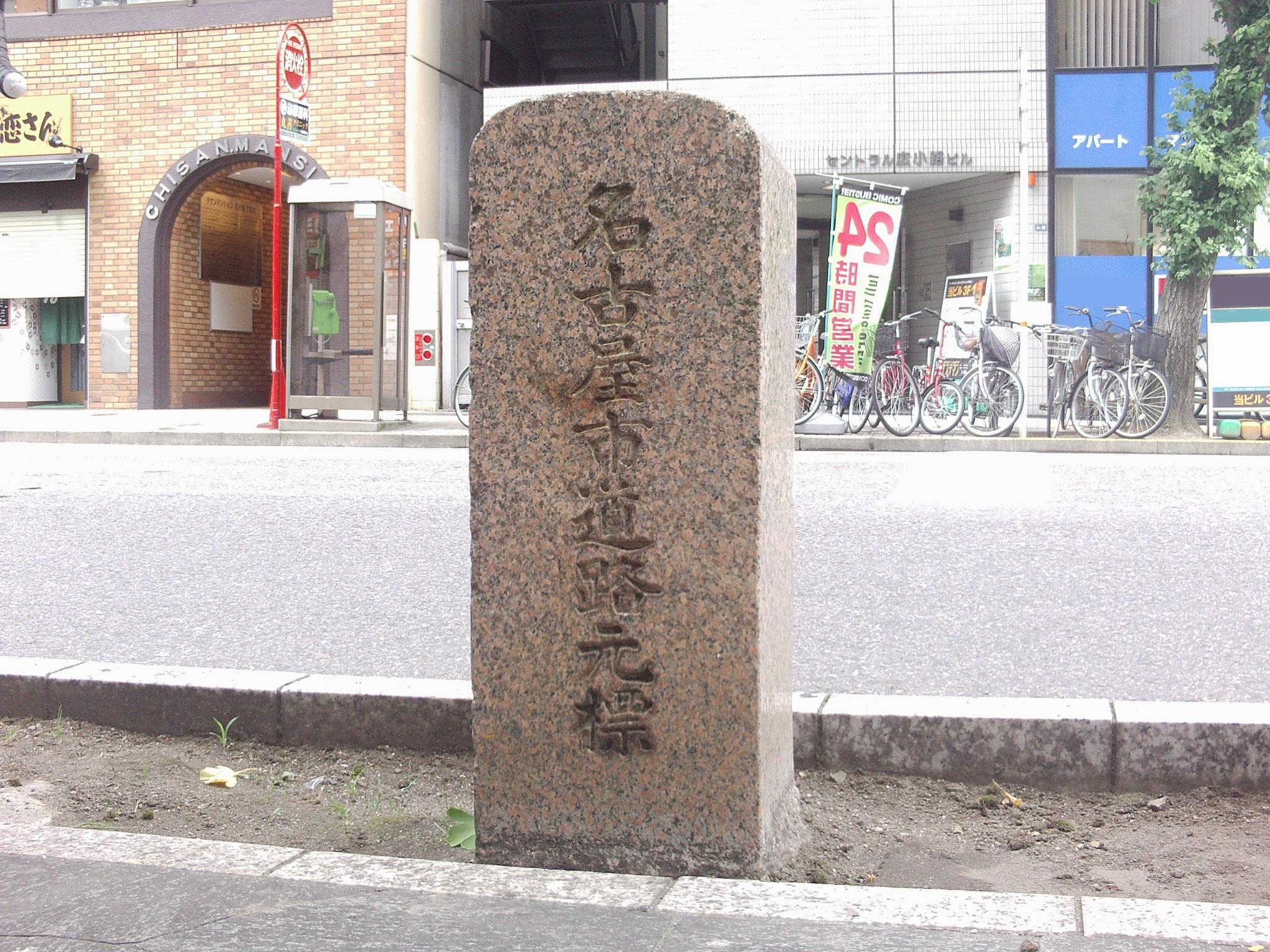
The Kilometre Zero of Nagoya

==== Expressways ====
- Nagoya Expressway
- Mei-Nikan Expressway
- Tōmei Expressway
- Isewangan Expressway
- Higashi-Meihan Expressway
- Chitahantō Road

==== Japan National Route ====
- National Route 1
- National Route 19
- National Route 22
- National Route 23
- National Route 41
- National Route 153
- National Route 154
- National Route 155
- National Route 247
- National Route 302
- National Route 363
- National Route 366

=== Seaways ===
==== Seaport ====
Nagoya Port is the largest port by international trade value in Japan. Toyota exports from this port.

Nagoya is known for its orderly grid street plan for which the shōgun Tokugawa Ieyasu is ultimately responsible.

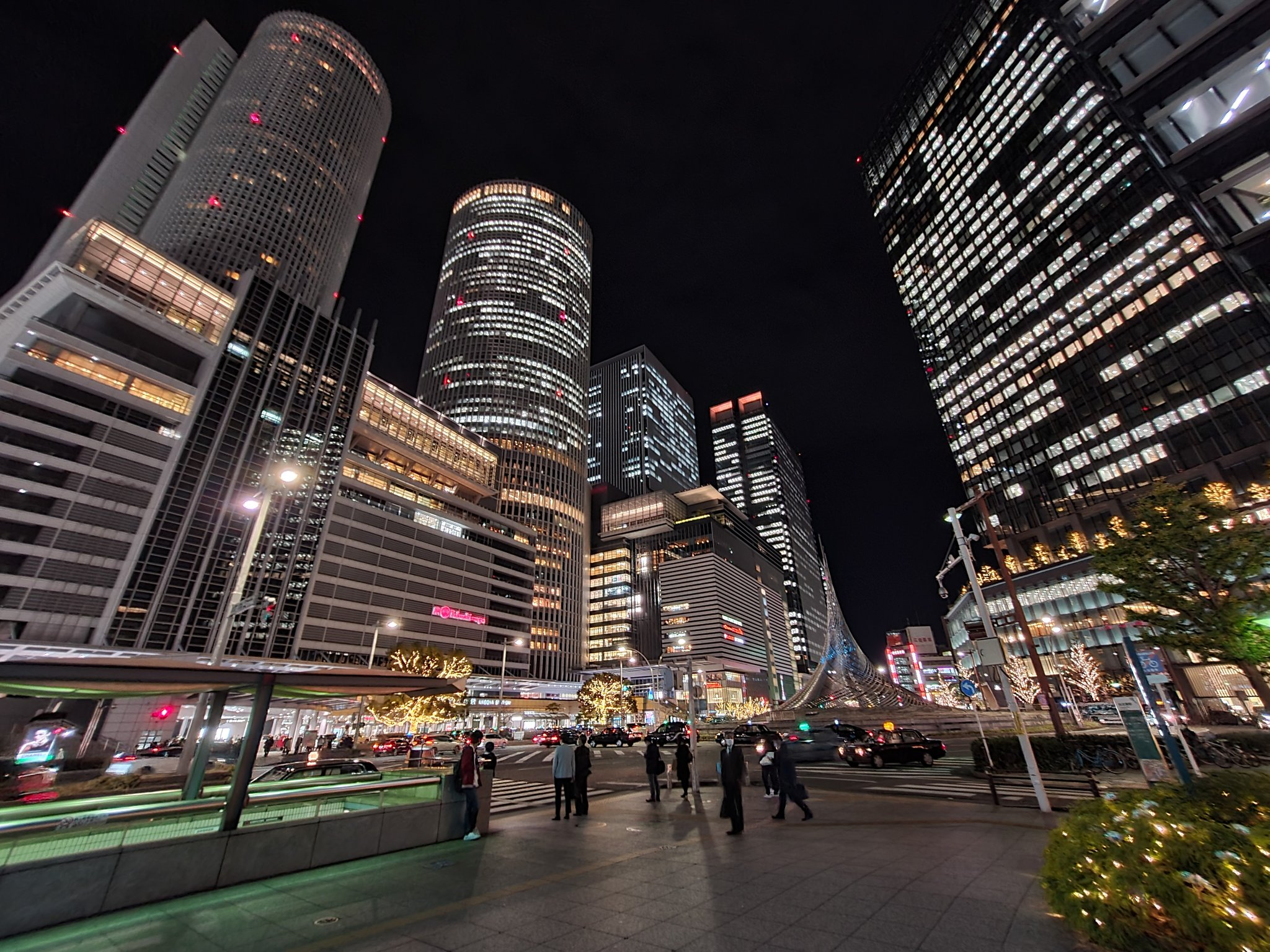
Nagoya Station

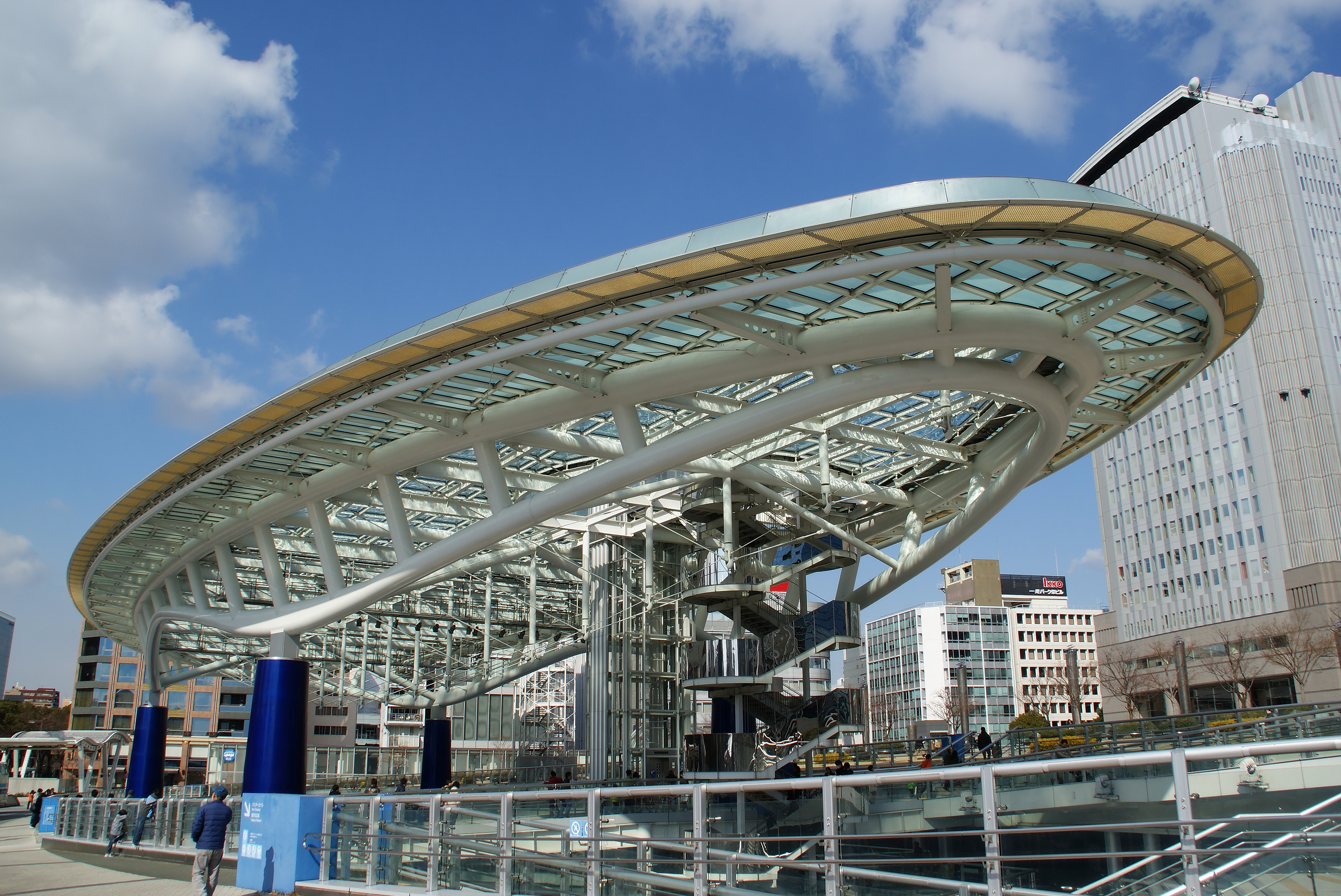
Oasis 21 bus terminal

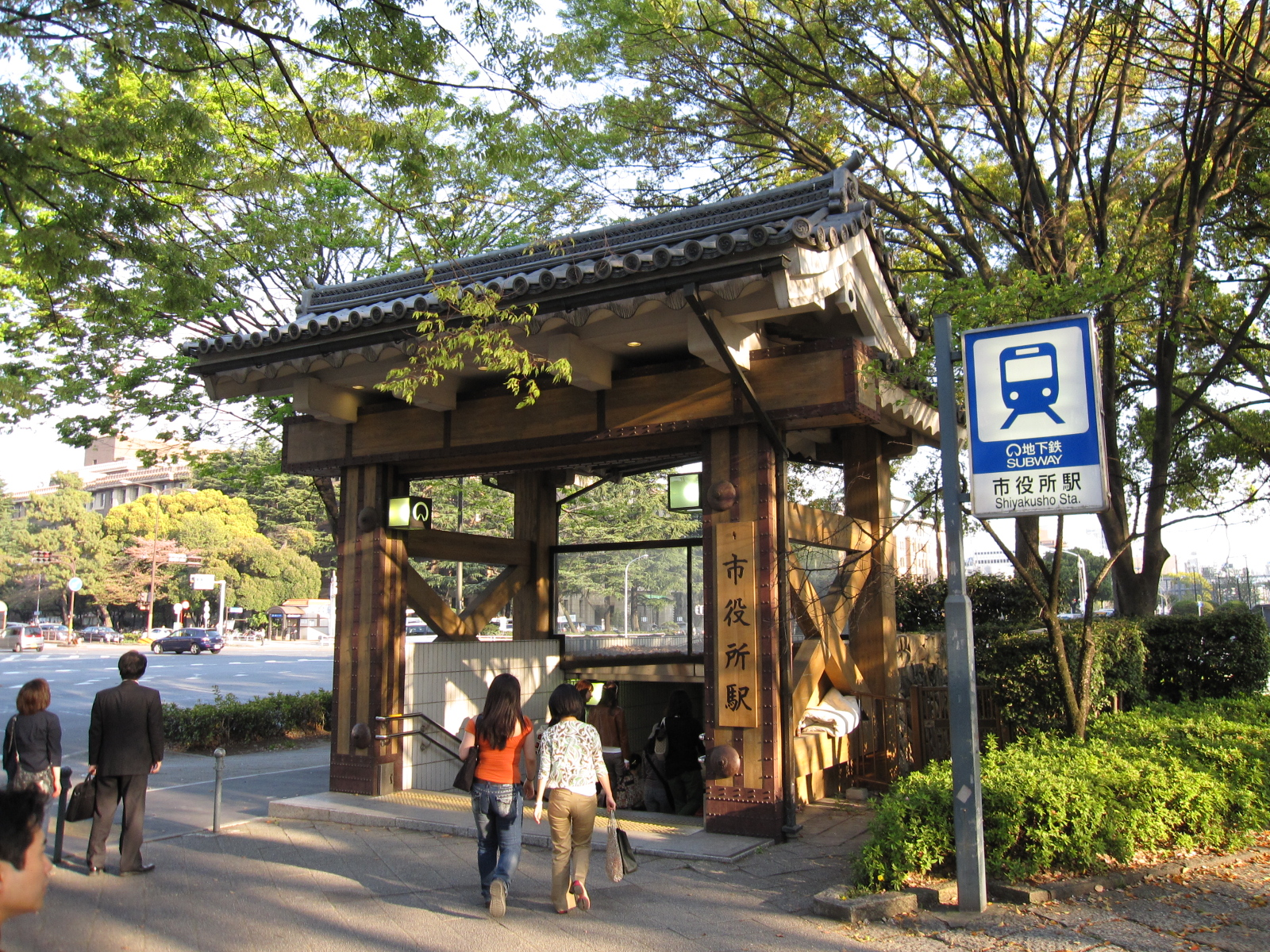
Entrance to Shiyakusho Subway Station

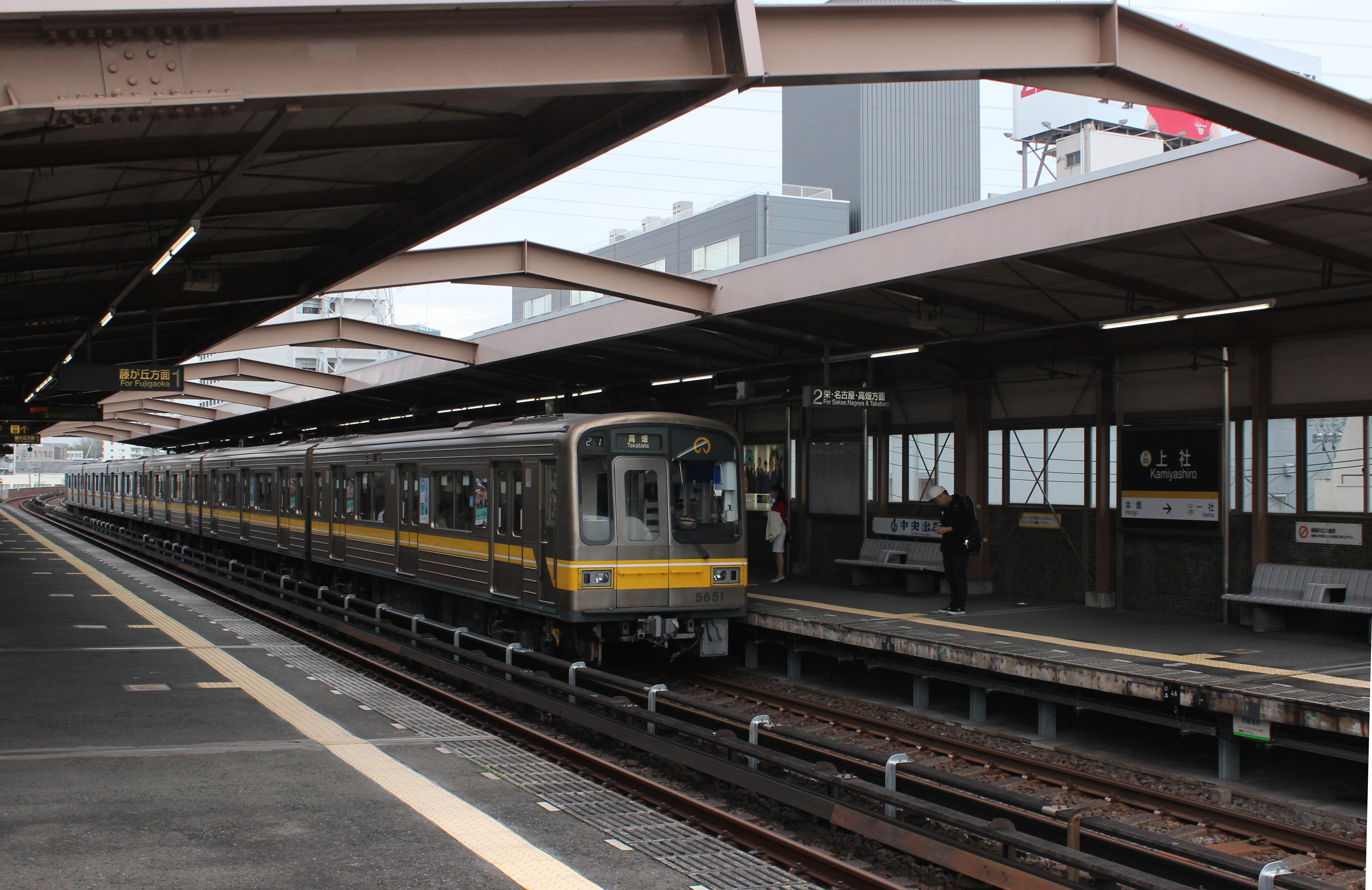
Nagoya Municipal Subway

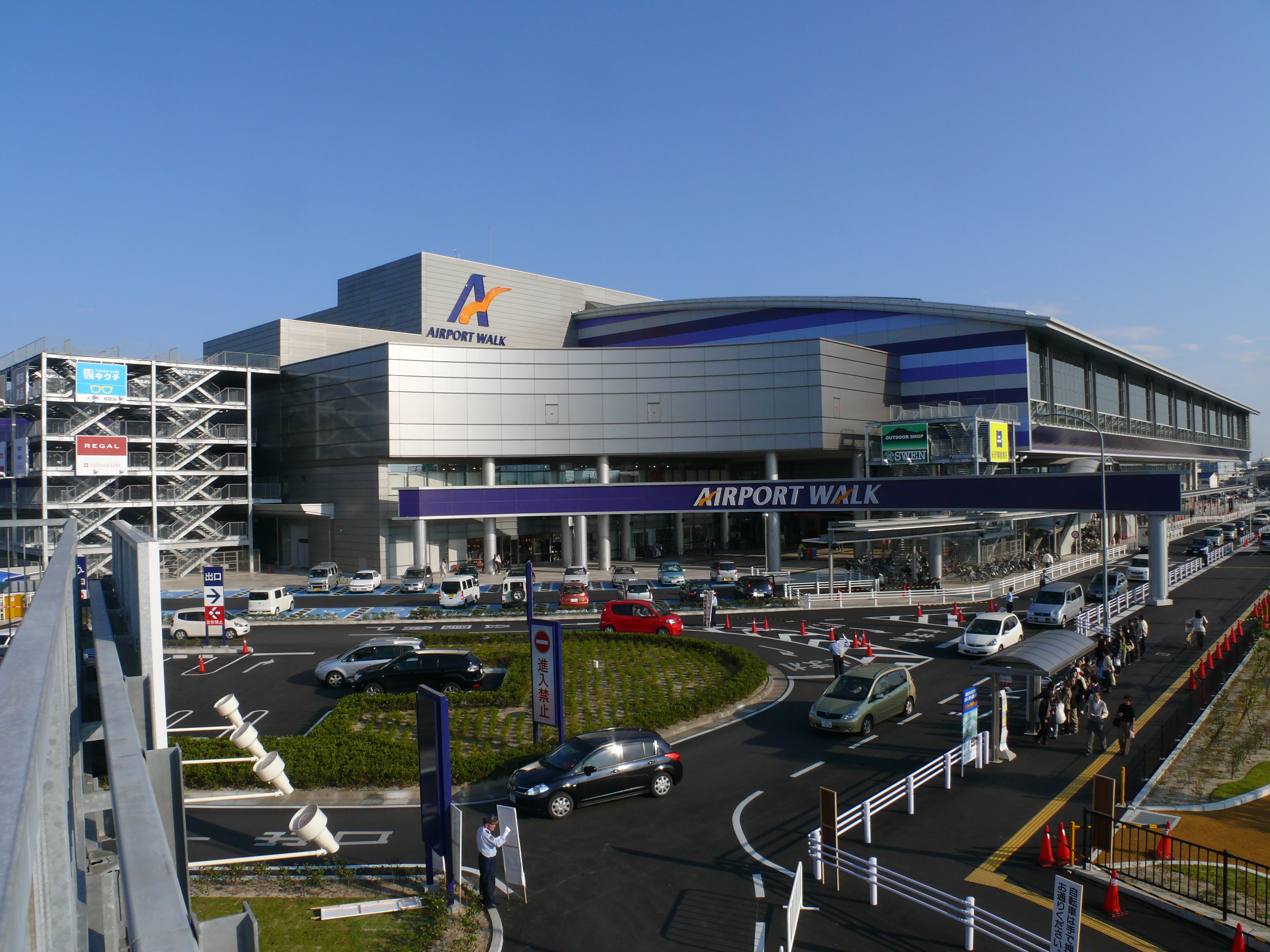
Chubu Airport

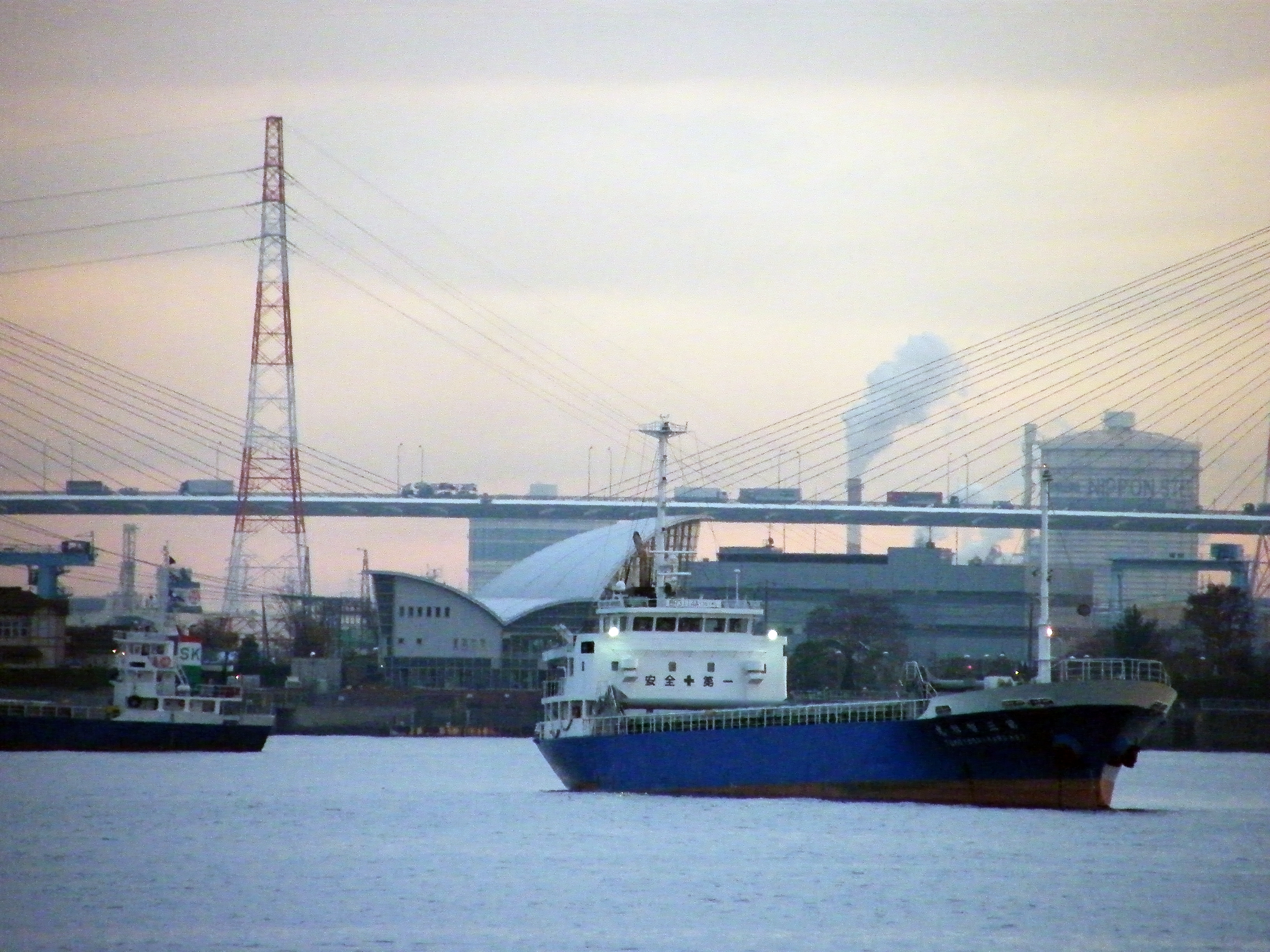
Port of Nagoya

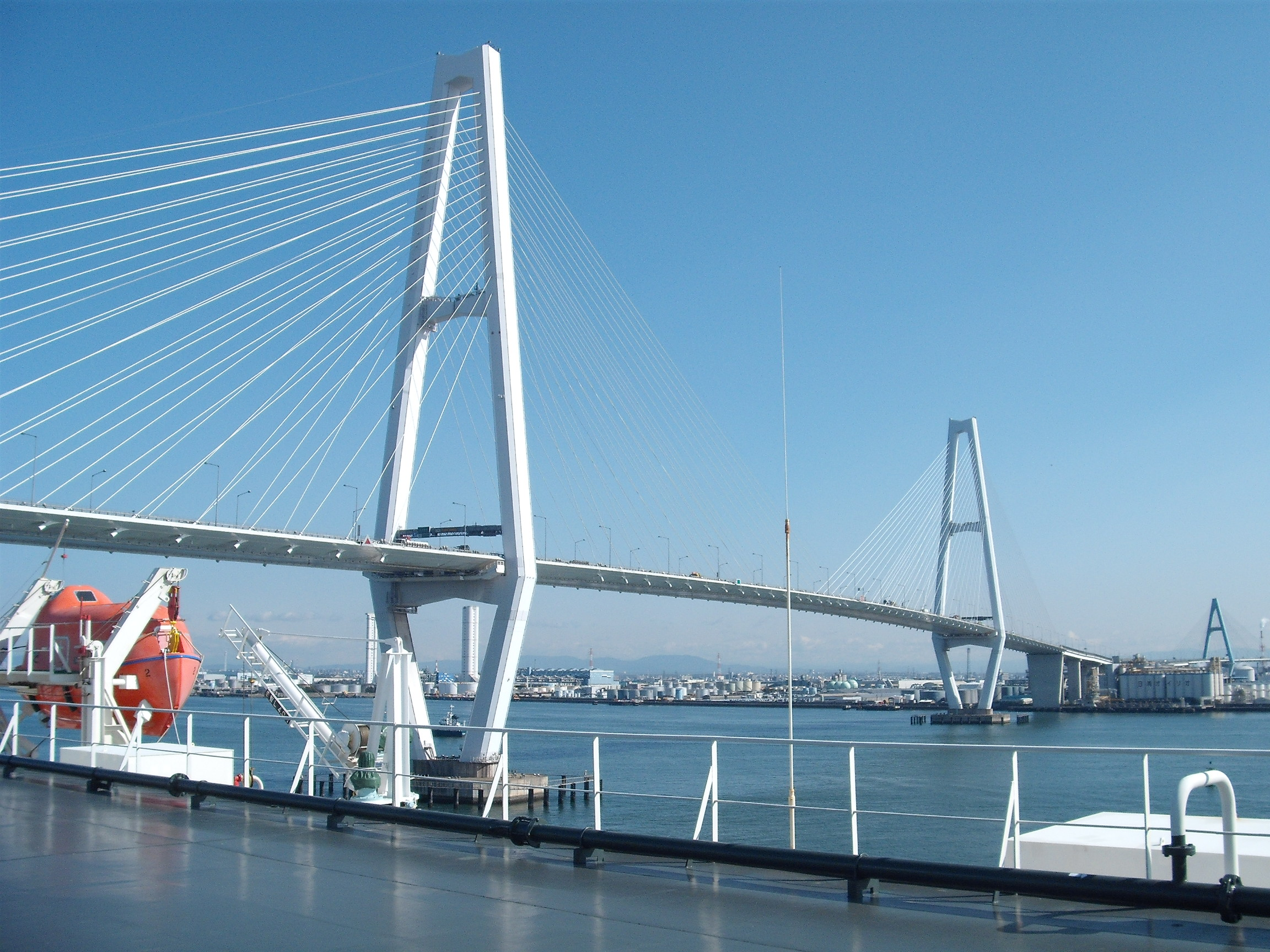
Isewangan Expressway

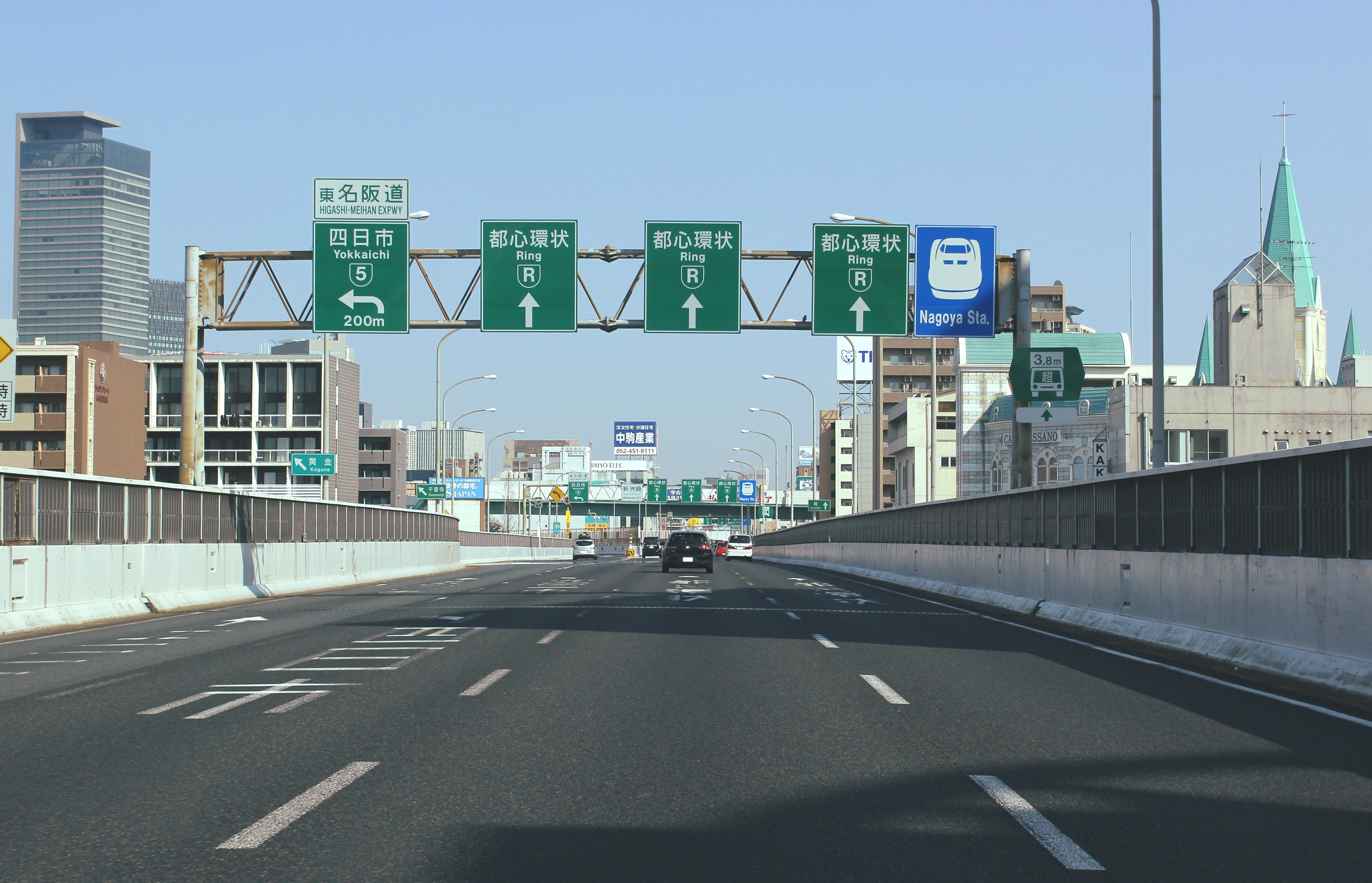
Nagoya Expressway

== Sightseeing ==
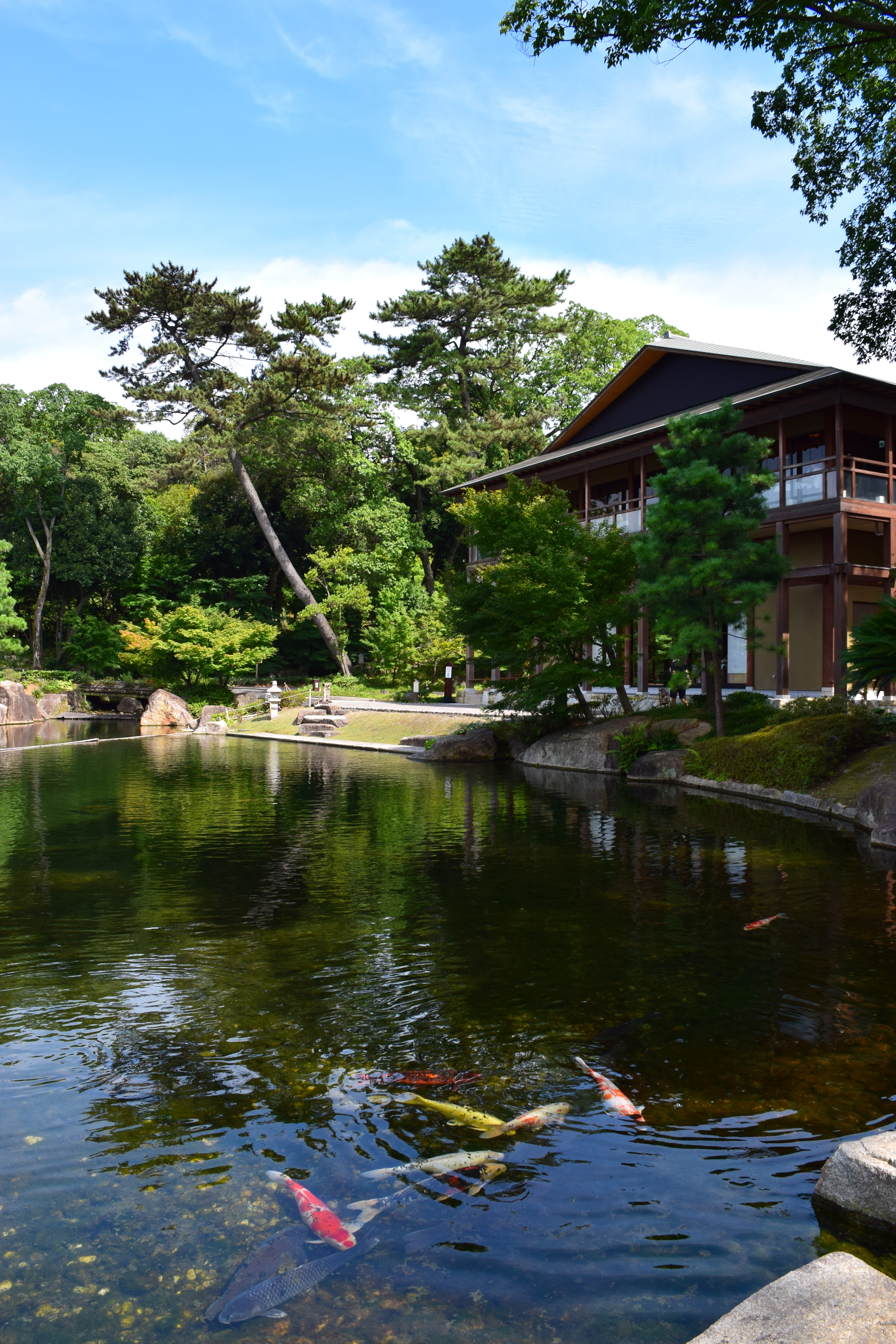
Tokugawa Garden

Nagoya's two most famous sightseeing spots are Atsuta Shrine and Nagoya Castle.

- Atsuta Shrine is the second-most venerable shrine in Japan, after Ise Grand Shrine. It is said to hold the Kusanagi sword, one of the three imperial regalia of Japan, but it is not on public display. It holds around 70 festivals per year. The shrine hosts over 4,400 national treasures that span its 2,000-year history.
- Nagoya Castle was built in 1612. Although a large part of it burned down during the Pacific War, the castle was restored in 1959, adding amenities such as elevators. The castle is famous for two magnificent Golden tiger-headed carp (金の鯱, Kin no Shachihoko) on the roof, often used as the symbol of Nagoya.

Other attractions include:

- Gokiso Hachimangū shinto shrine
- Nagoya TV Tower and Hisaya-Ōdori Park, located in the central Sakae district
- JR Central Towers is part of the Nagoya Station
- Midland Square: The new international sales headquarters for Toyota features Japan's highest open-air observation deck.
- The Port of Nagoya area, which includes the former Italian-themed shopping mall called Italia Mura as well as the popular Port of Nagoya Public Aquarium.
- Higashiyama Zoo and Botanical Gardens and the Higashiyama Sky Tower
- The Toyota Commemorative Museum of Industry and Technology near Nagoya station
- Danpusan Kofun : The largest burial mound (Kofun) in Aichi.
- The Noritake factory: The home of Noritake fine chinaware is open to visitors and allows people to learn about the history of the establishment. It includes a cafe, information/technology displays, and shopping facilities. It also holds a few unrestored areas that serve as reminders of devastation caused by the final stages of the Pacific War.
- The SCMaglev and Railway Park
- The Ōsu shopping district and nearby temples, Ōsu Kannon and Banshō-ji
- The Tokugawa Art Museum and the Tokugawa Garden, a surrounding Japanese garden
- The Nagoya City Science and Art Museums, located in Shirakawa Park, not far from Fushimi Subway Station
- The MUFG Money Museum, now located near the Akatsuka-shirakabe 赤塚白壁 bus stop on Dekimachi-dōri.
- Legoland Japan Resort, Japan's first Legoland resort.

=== Gallery ===
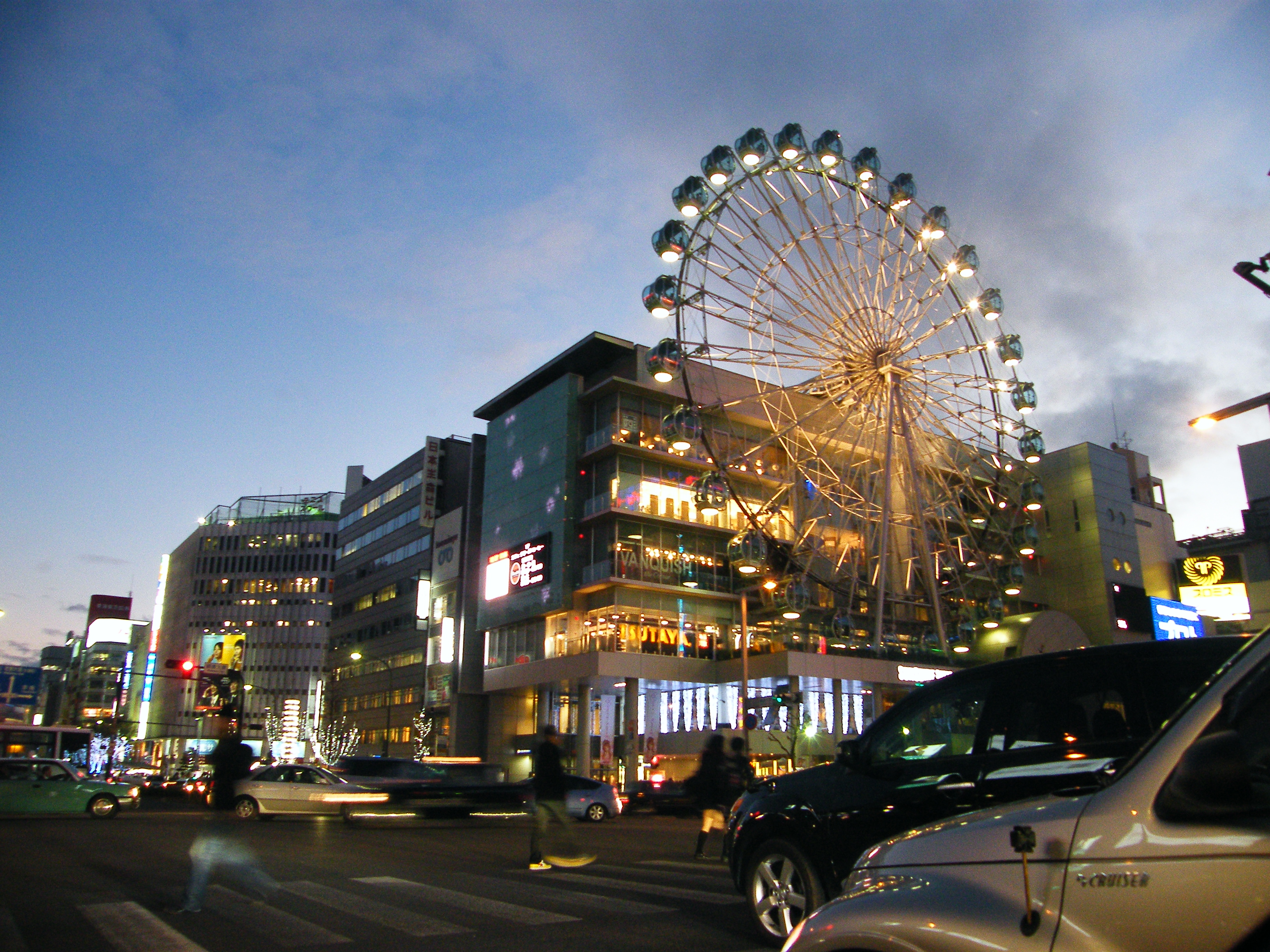
Sakae Town

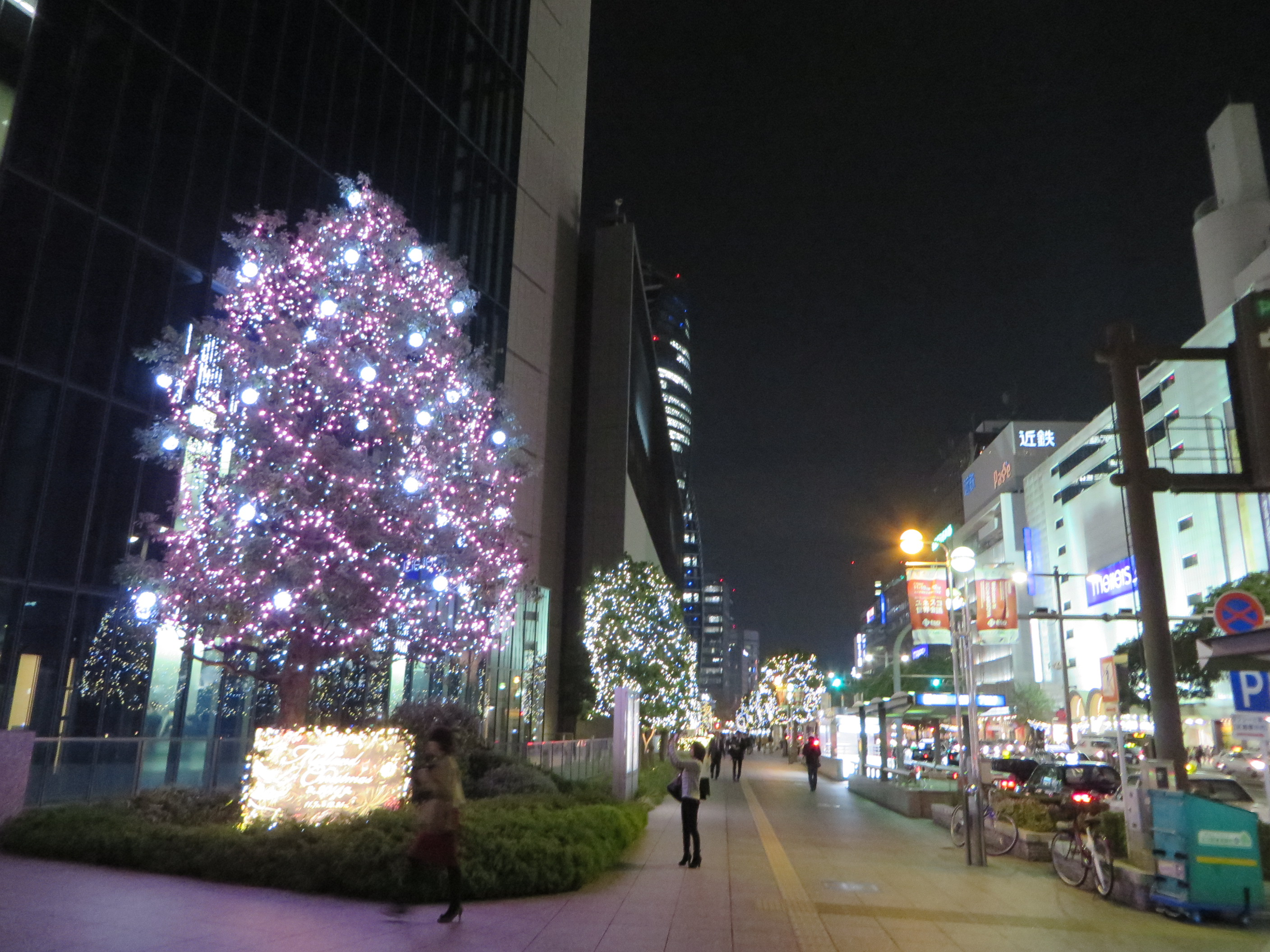
Meieki Town

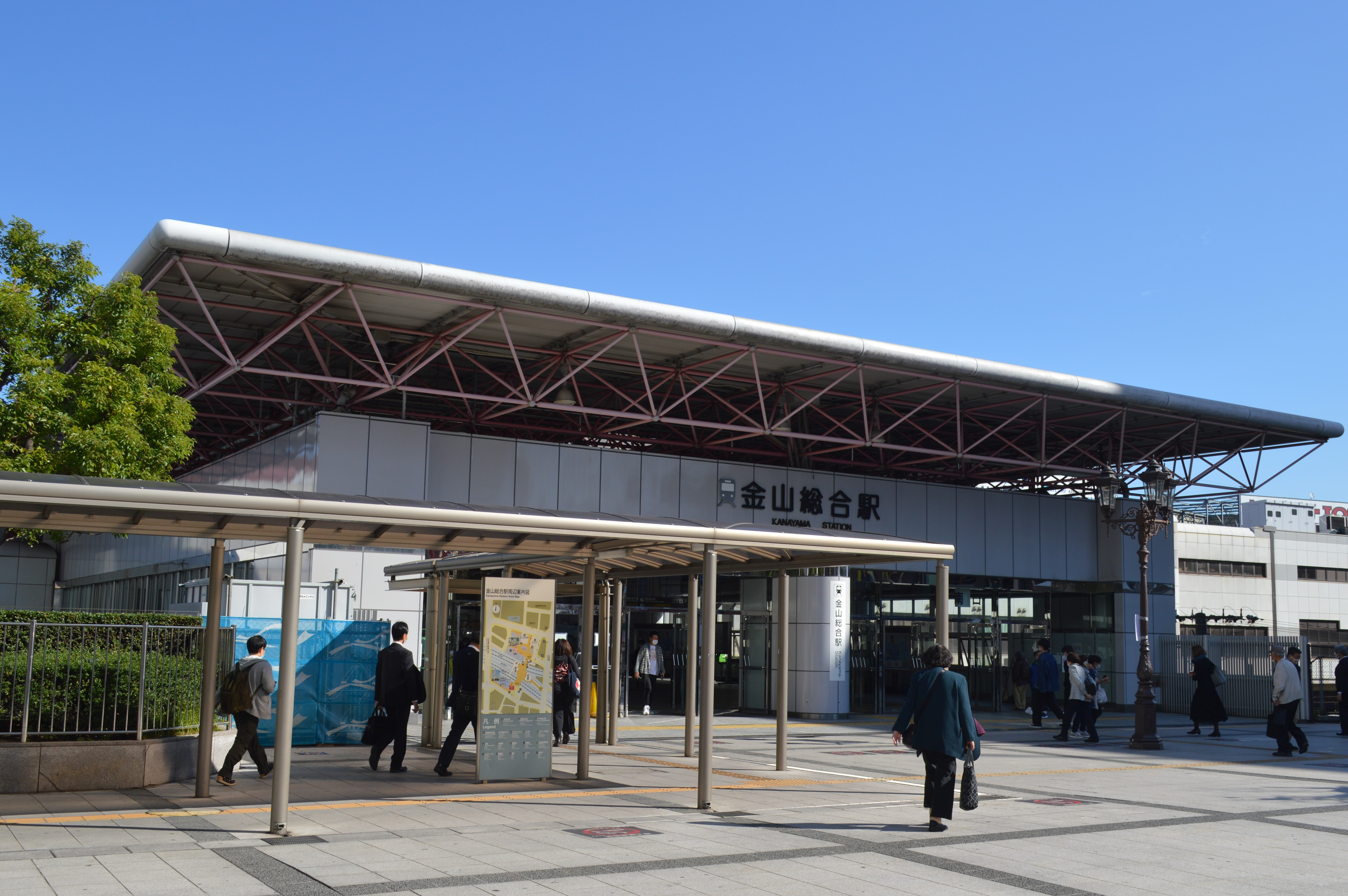
Kanayama Town

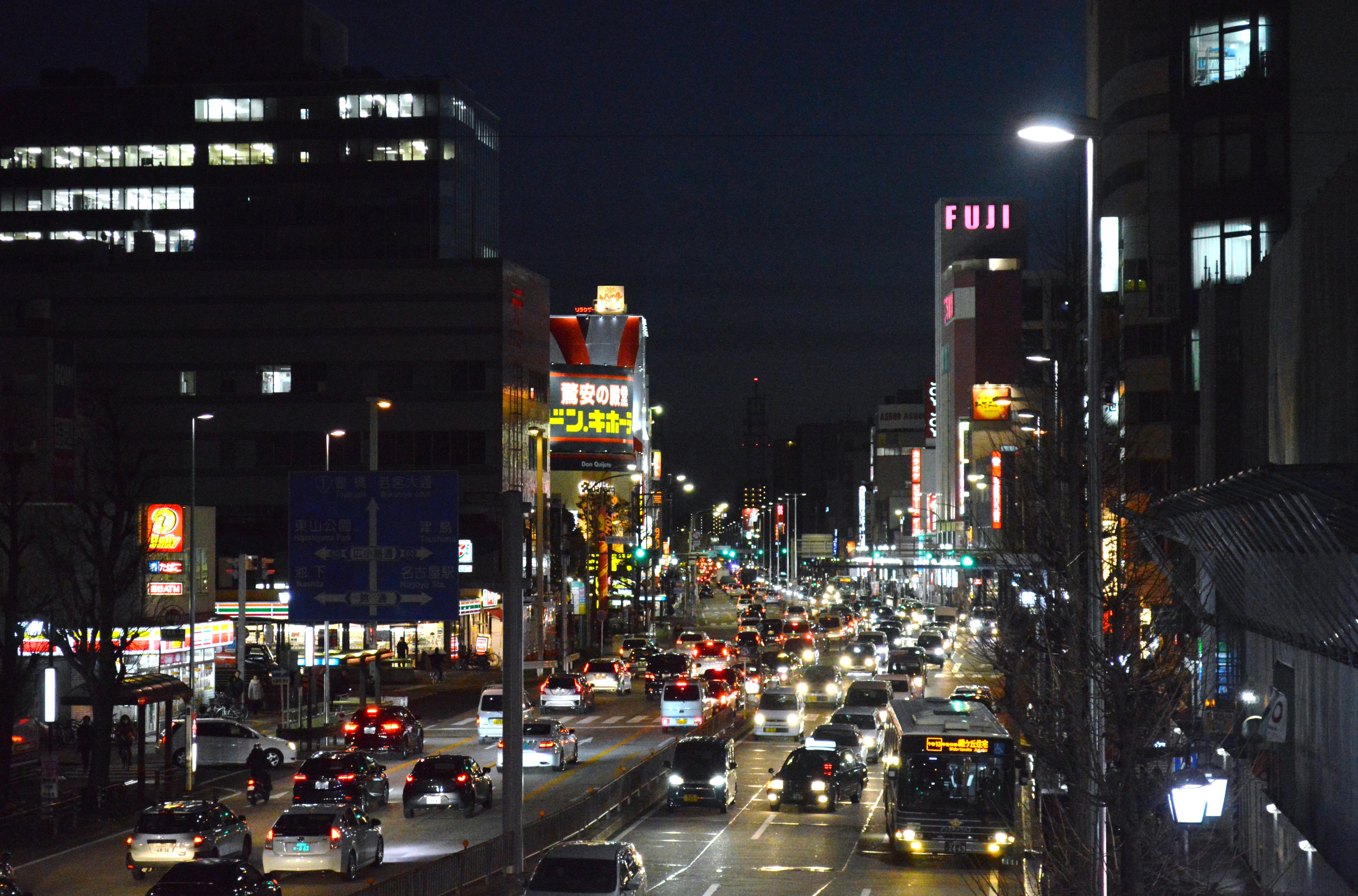
Imaike Town

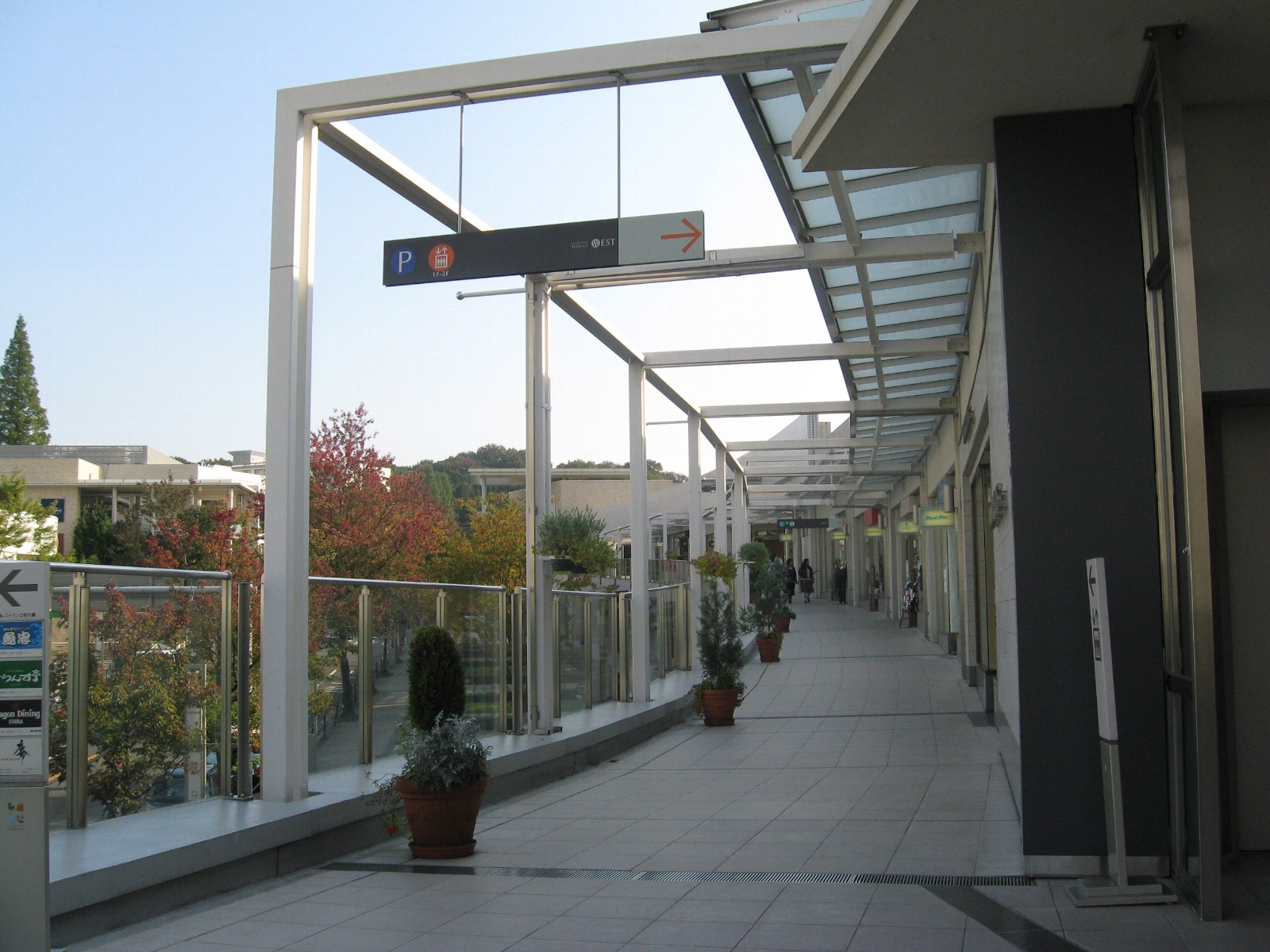
Hoshigaoka Town

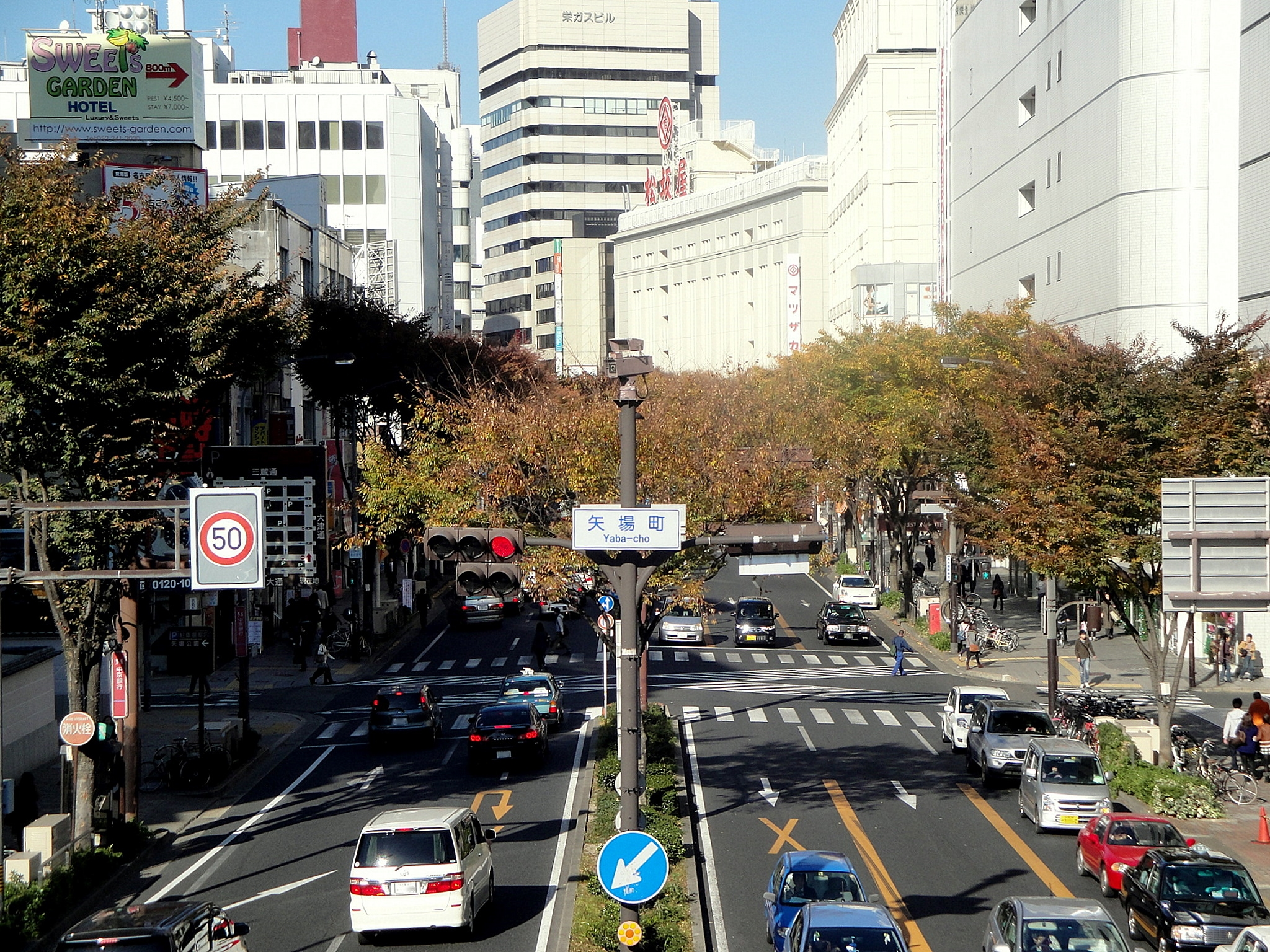
Yabacho Town

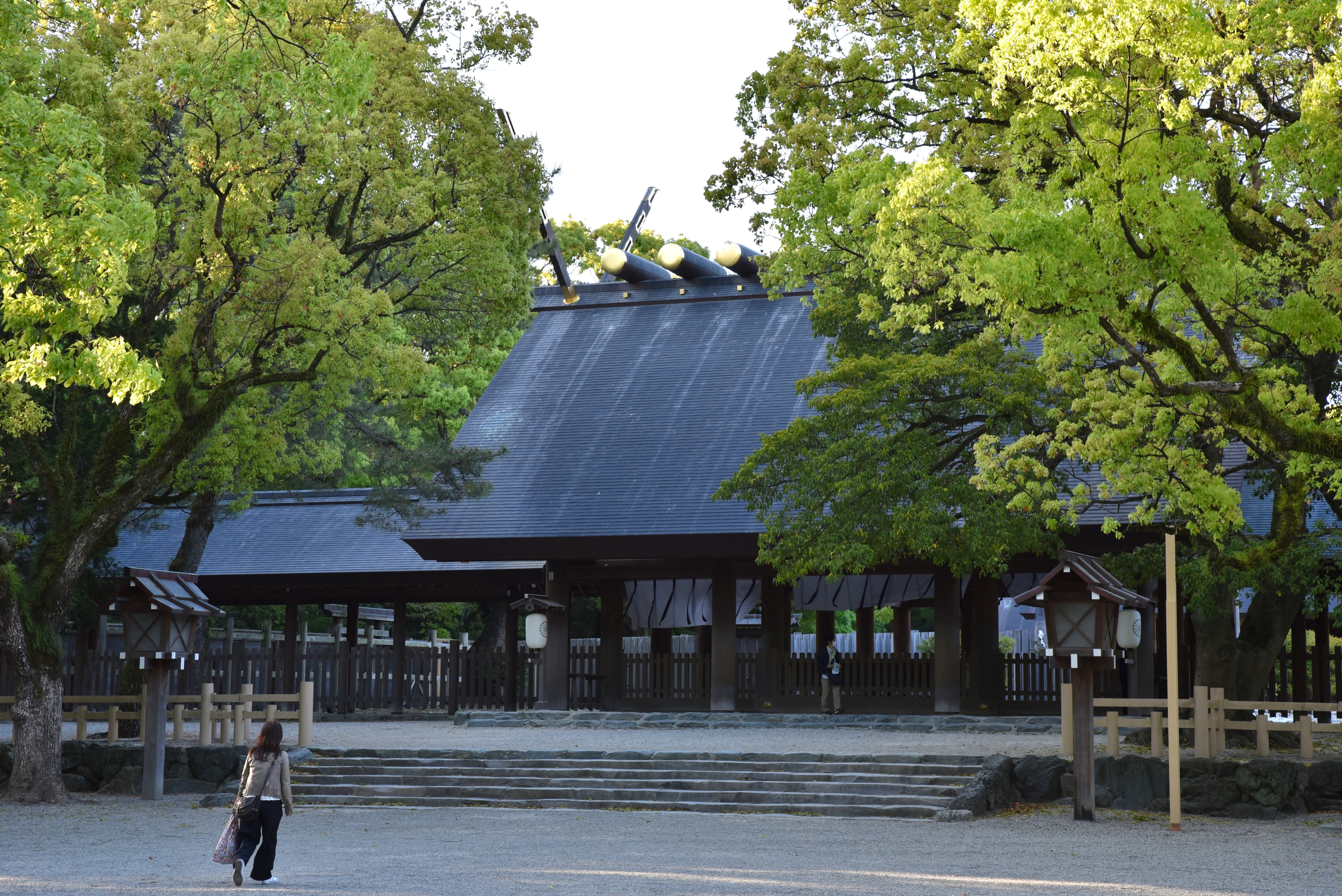
Atsuta Shrine

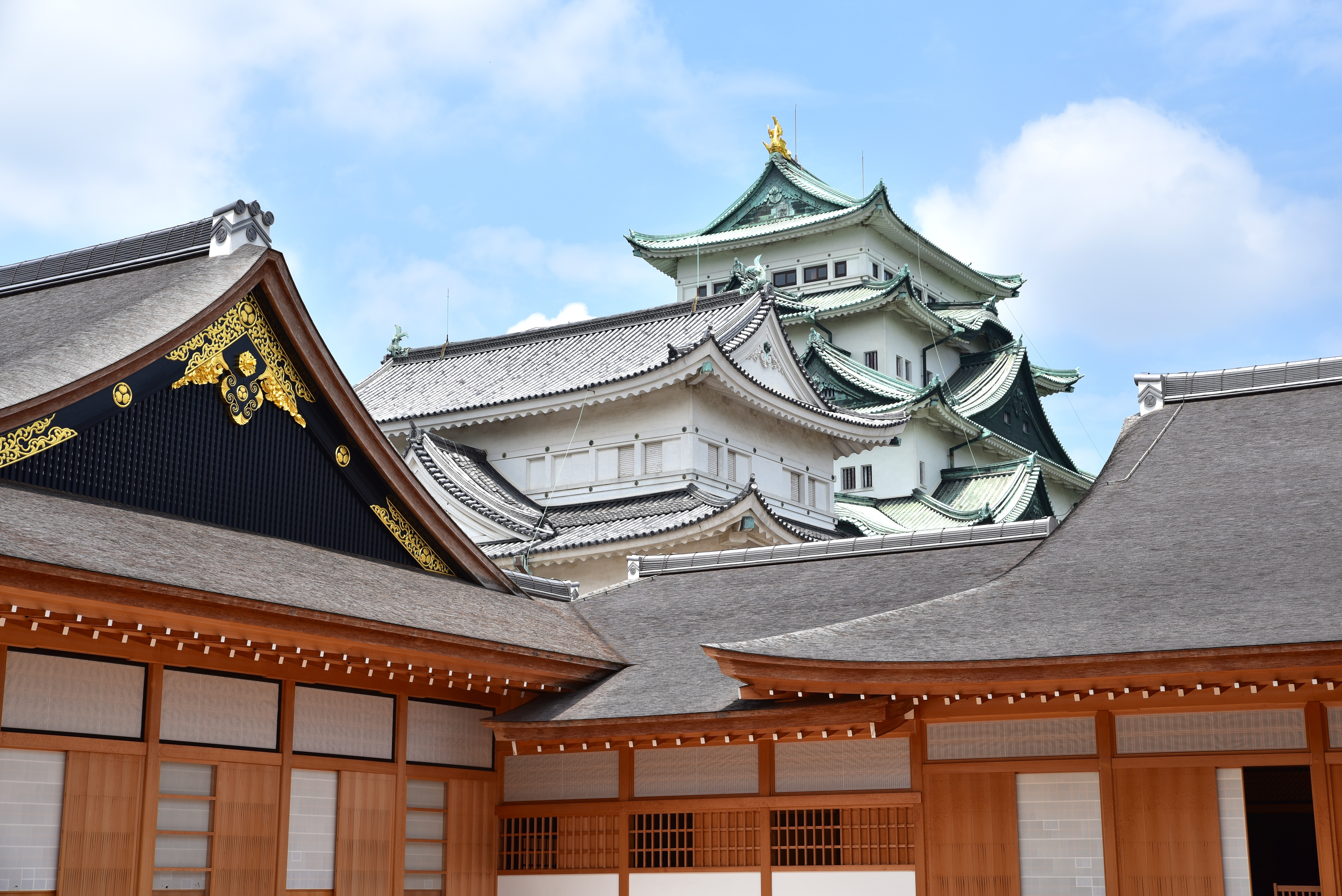
Nagoya Castle

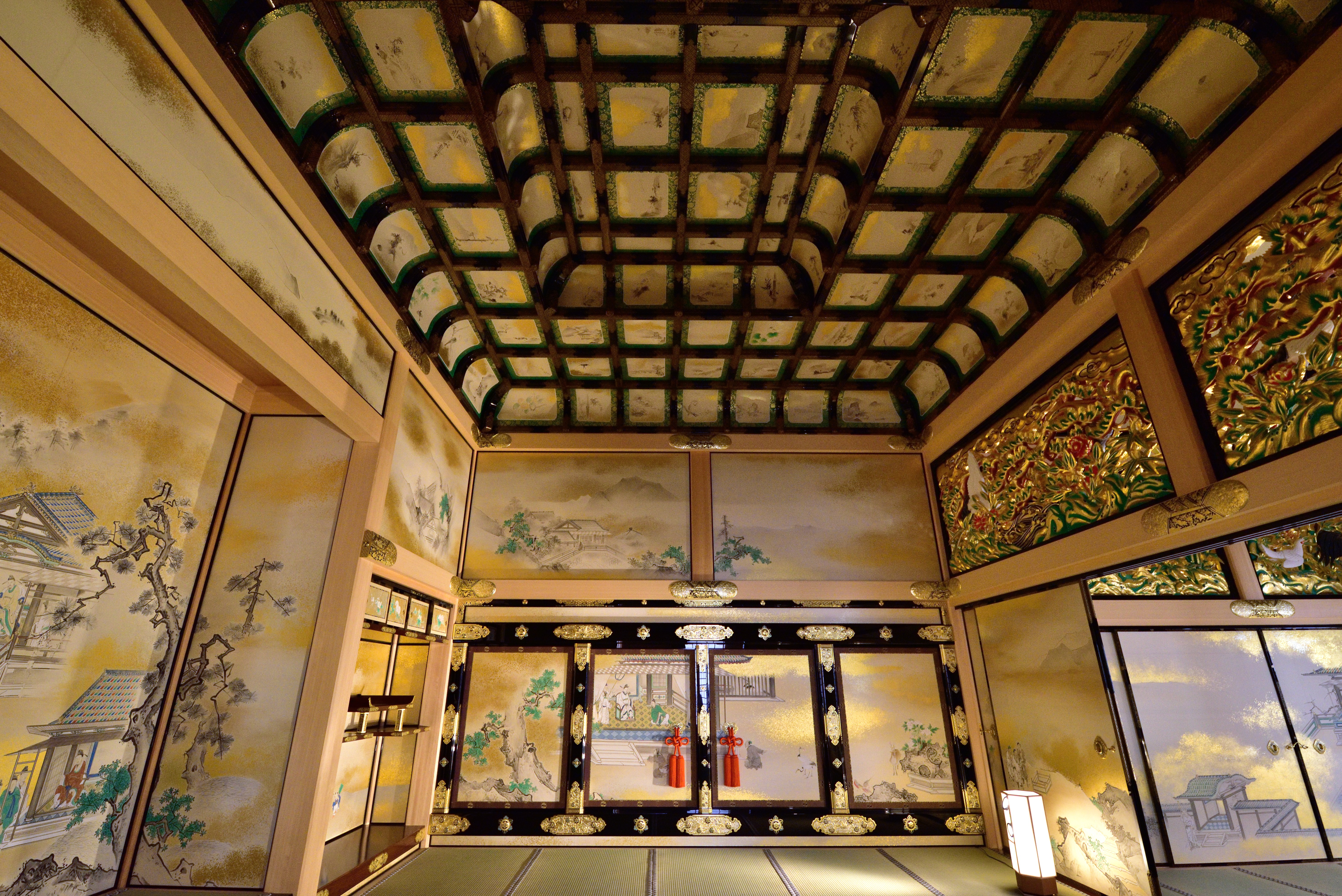
Honmaru Palace (Nagoya Castle)

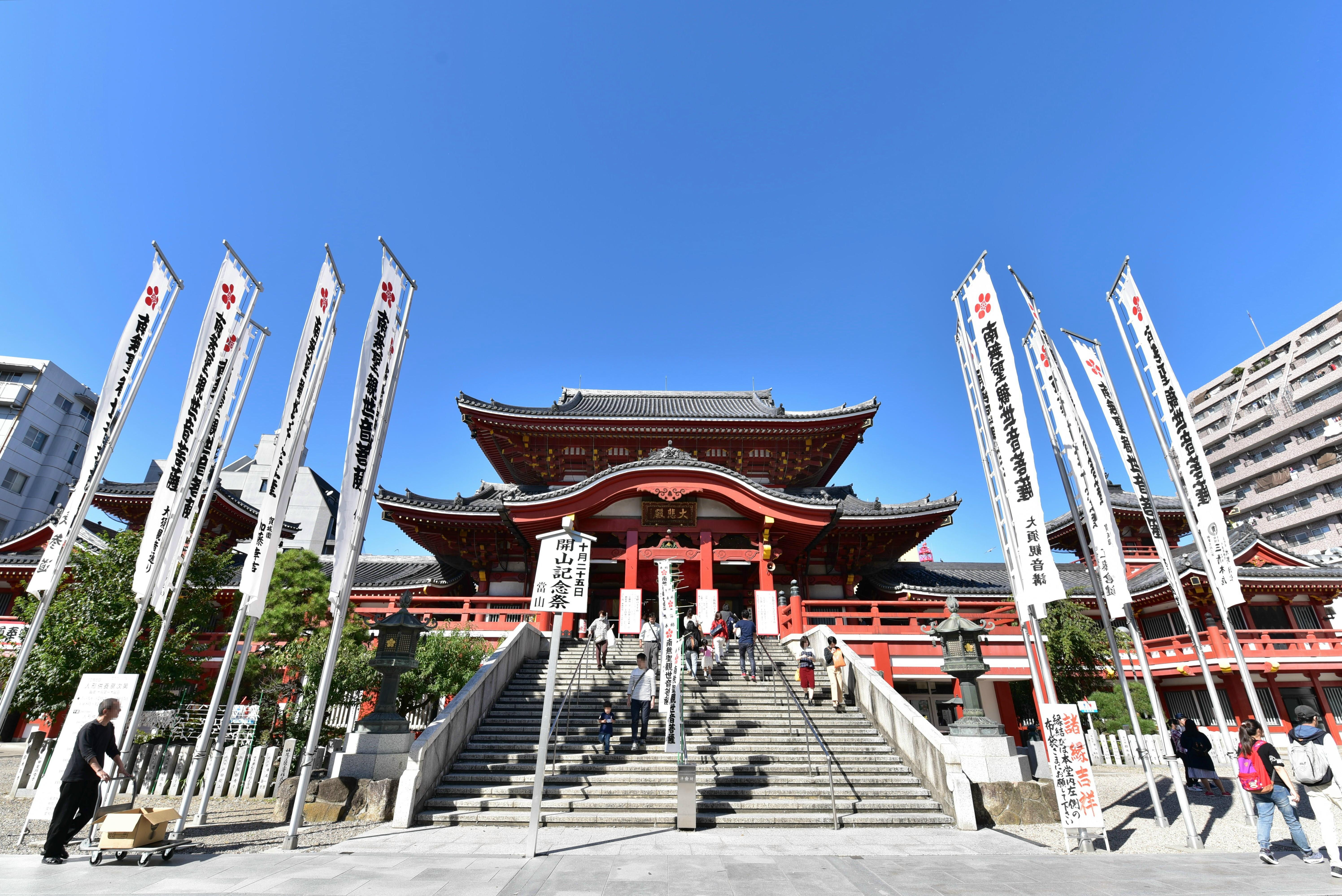
Ōsu Kannon

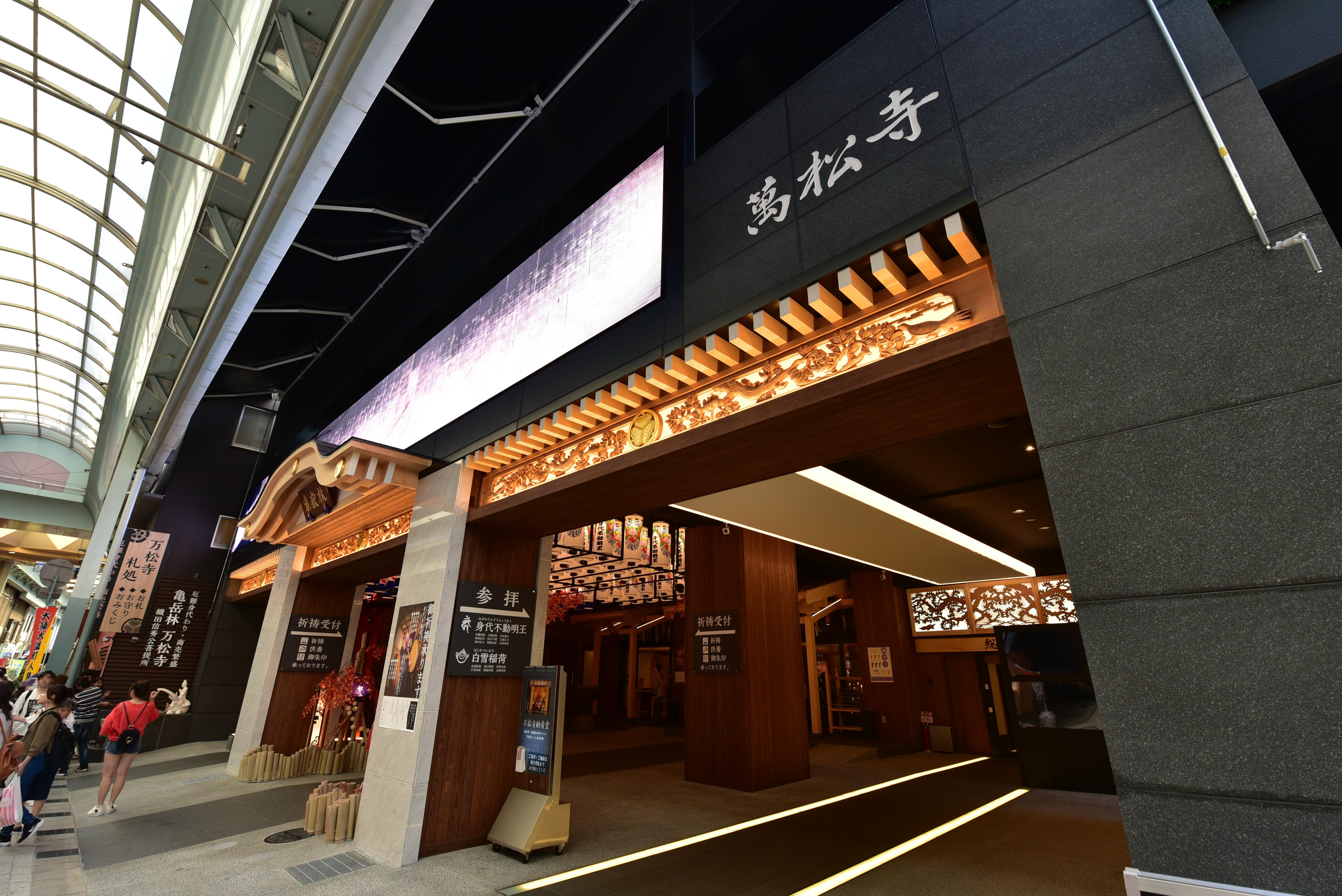
Banshō-ji

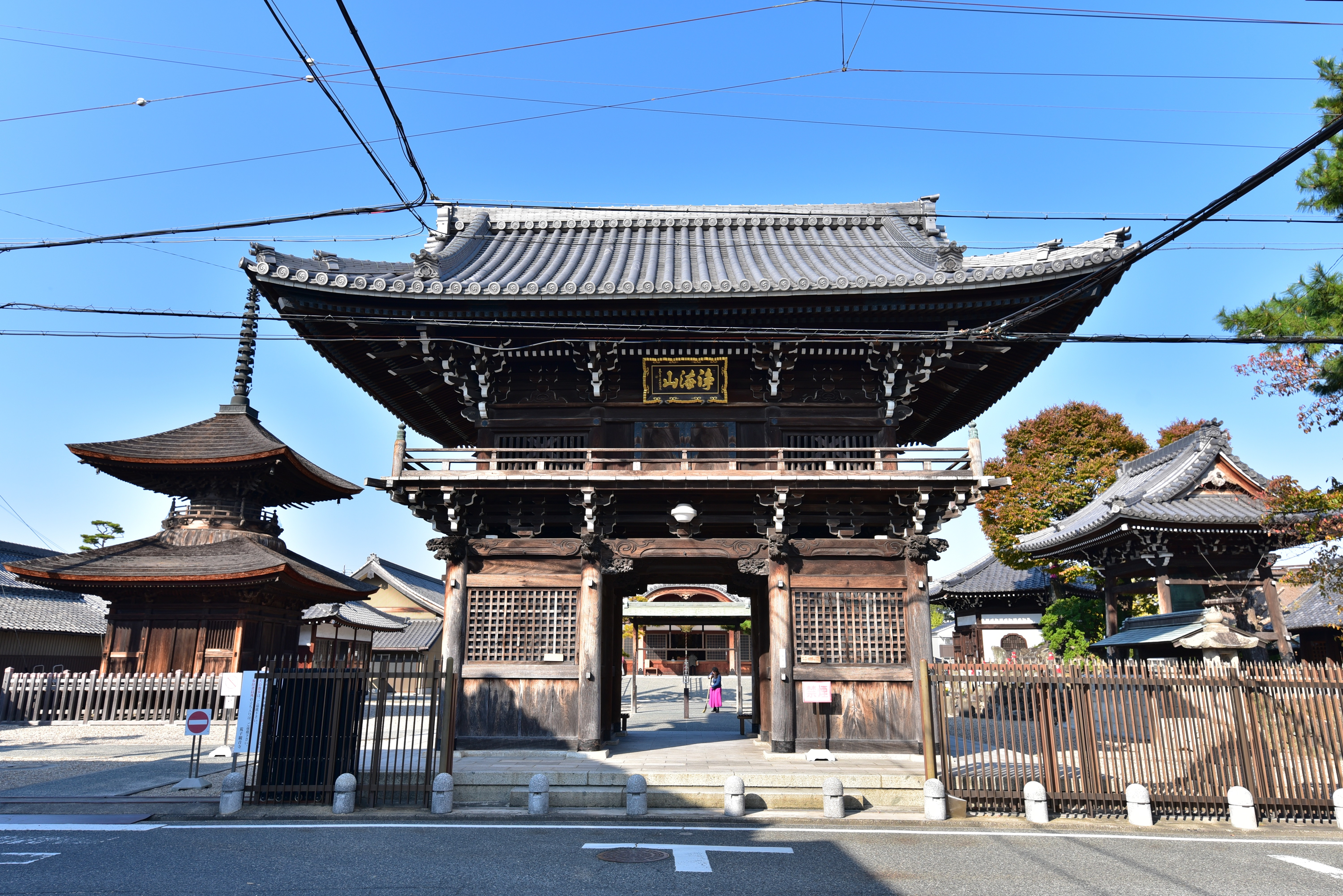
Arako Kannon

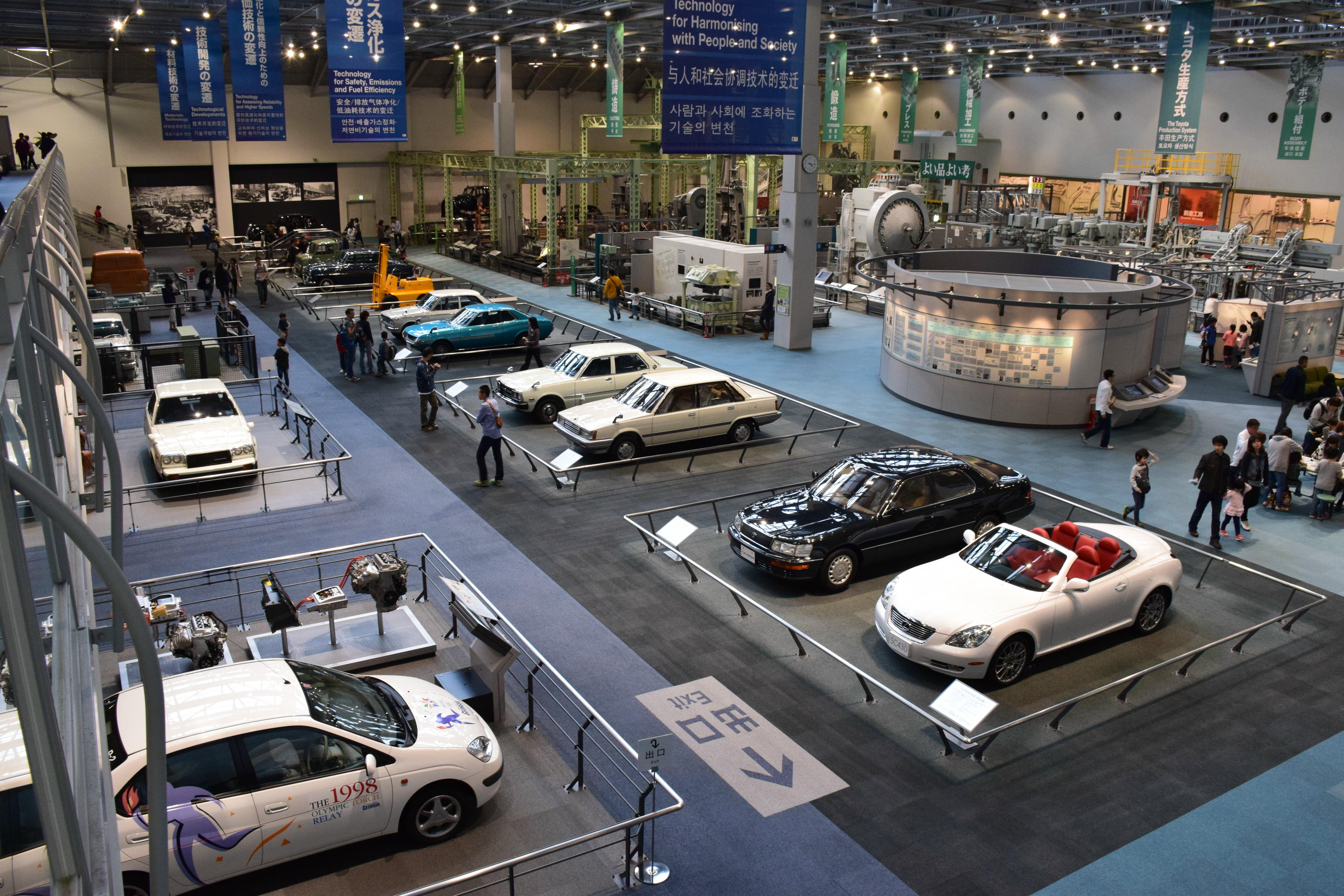
Toyota Commemorative Museum of Industry and Technology

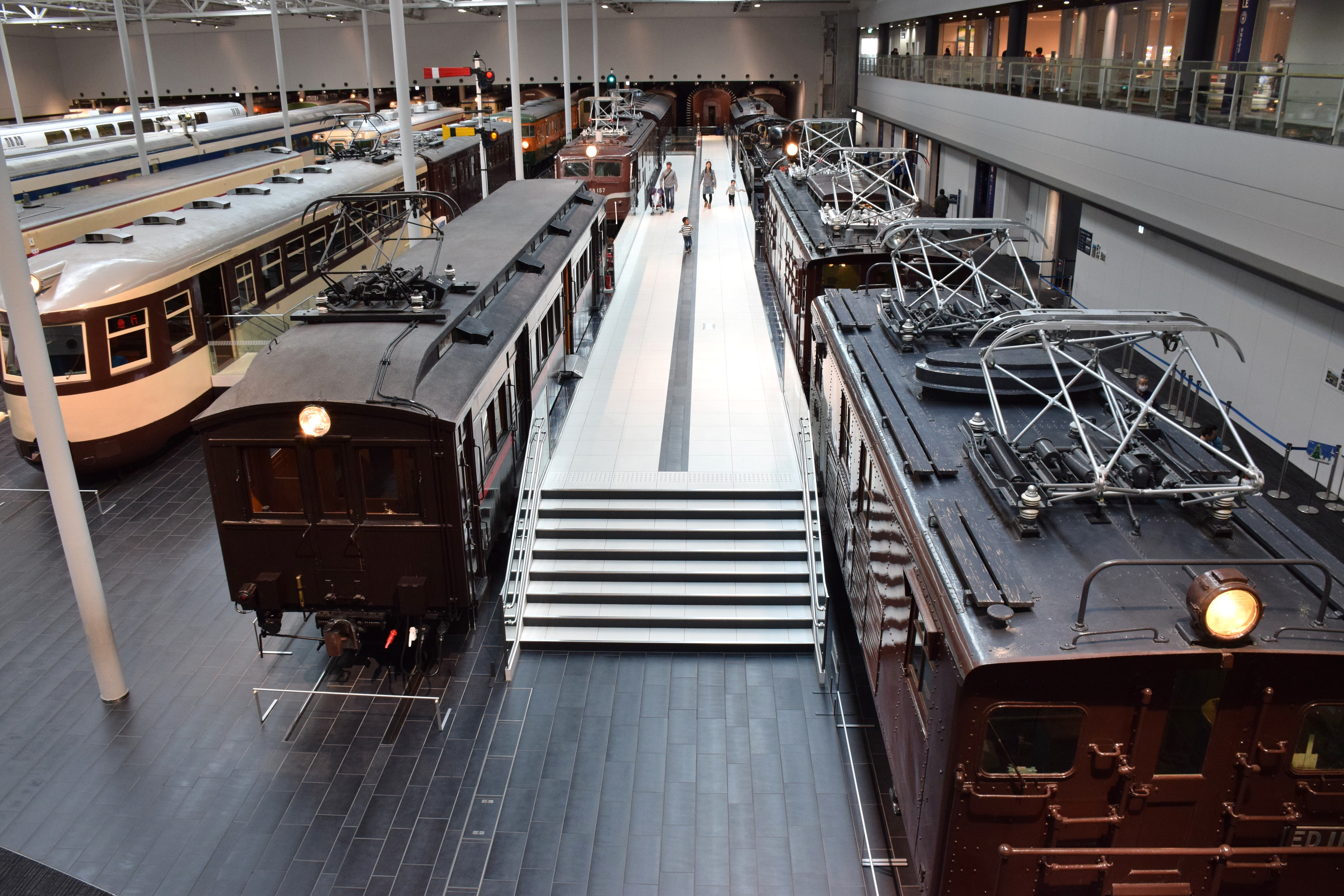
SCMaglev and Railway Park

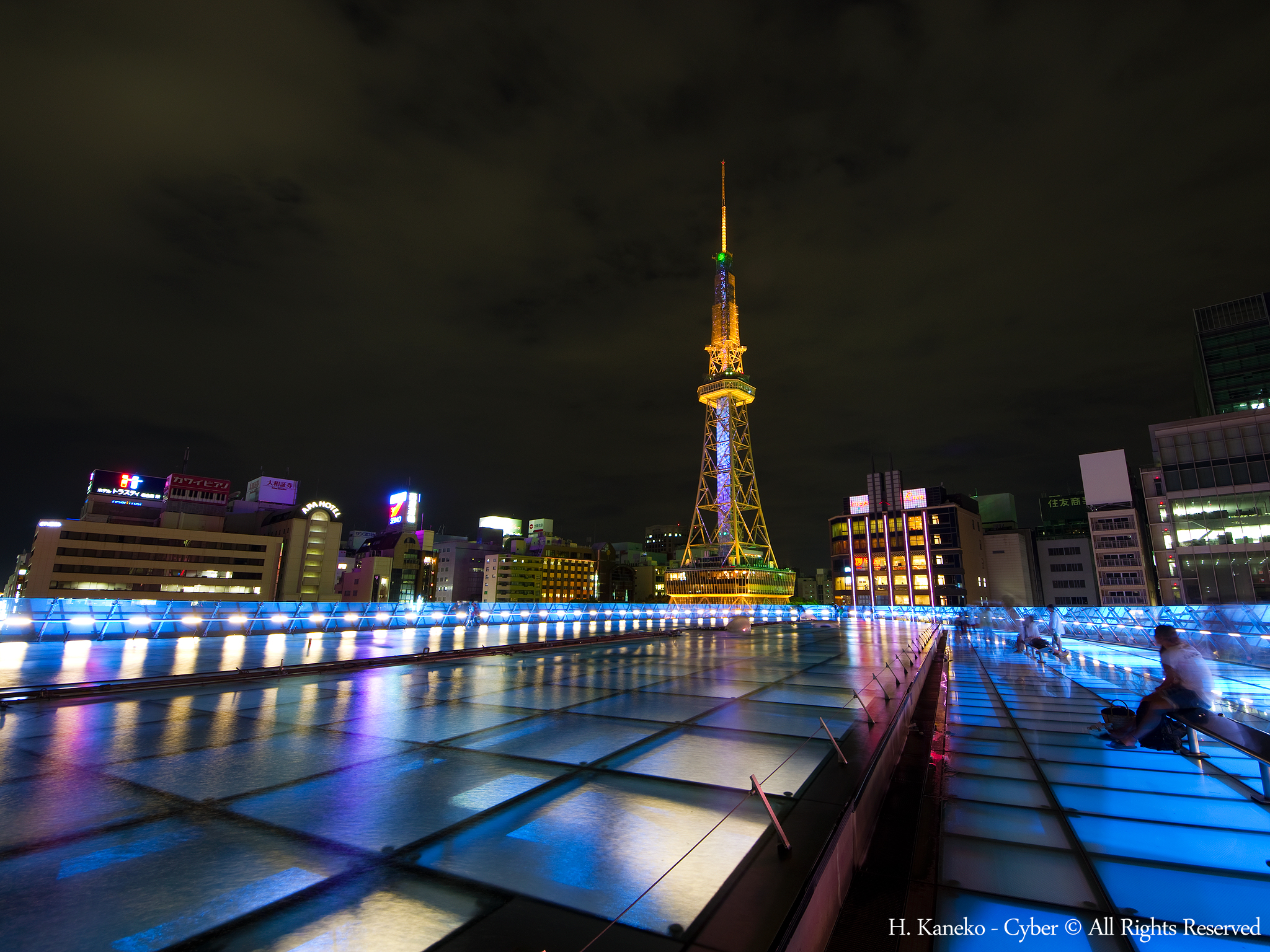
The Nagoya TV Tower and Oasis 21

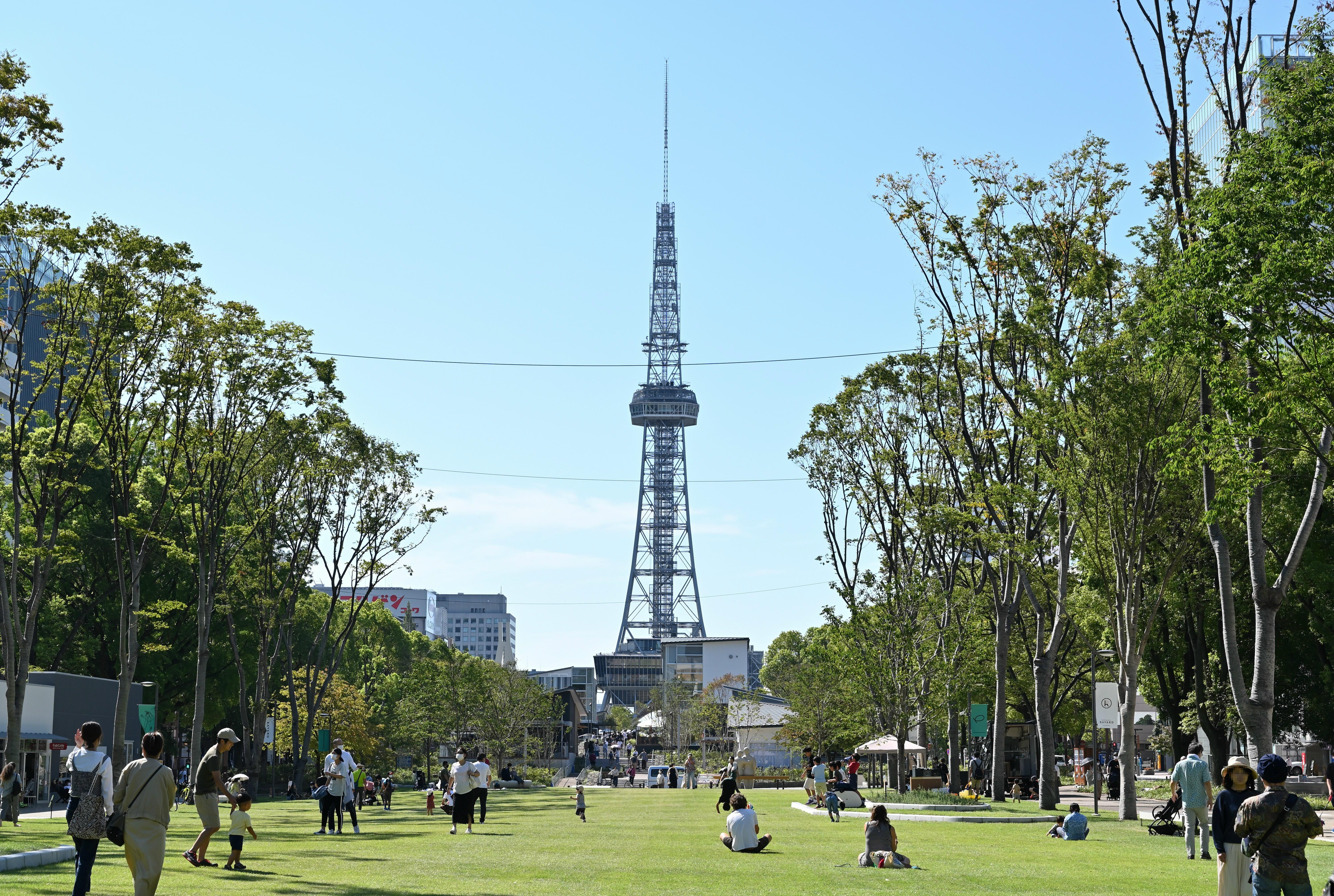
Hisaya Ōdori Park
(Nagoya Central Park)

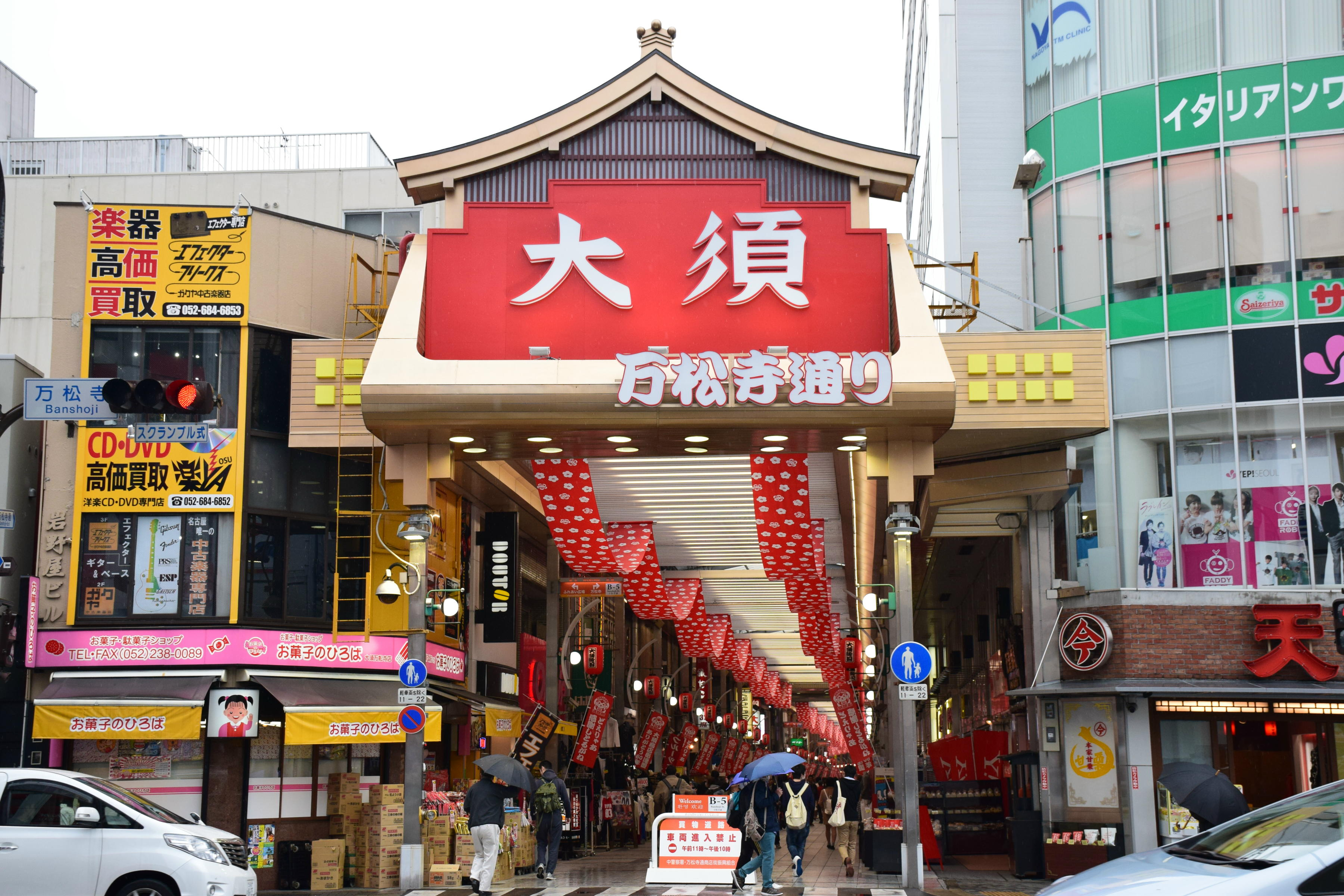
Ōsu shopping district

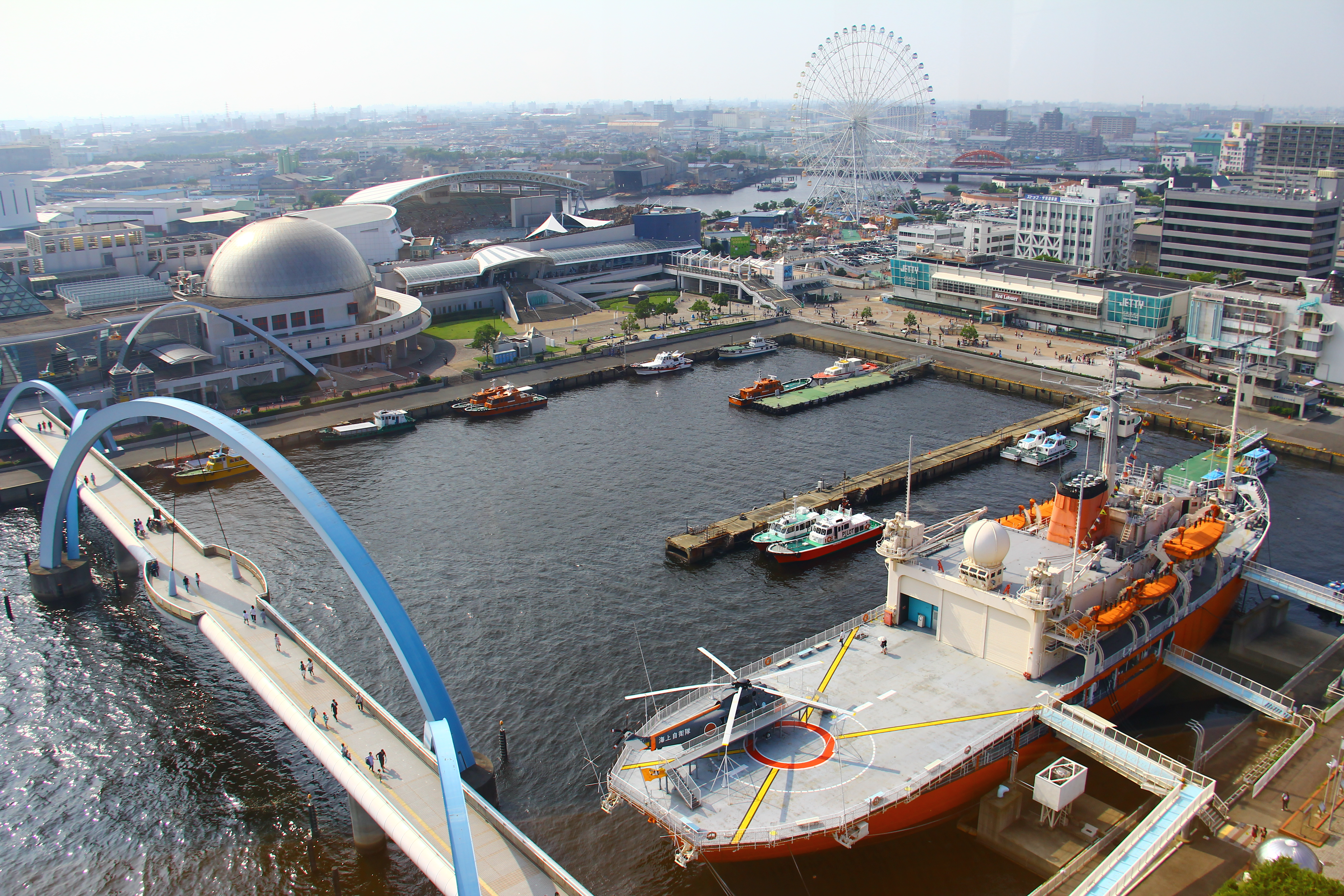
Port of Nagoya
Garden Wharf

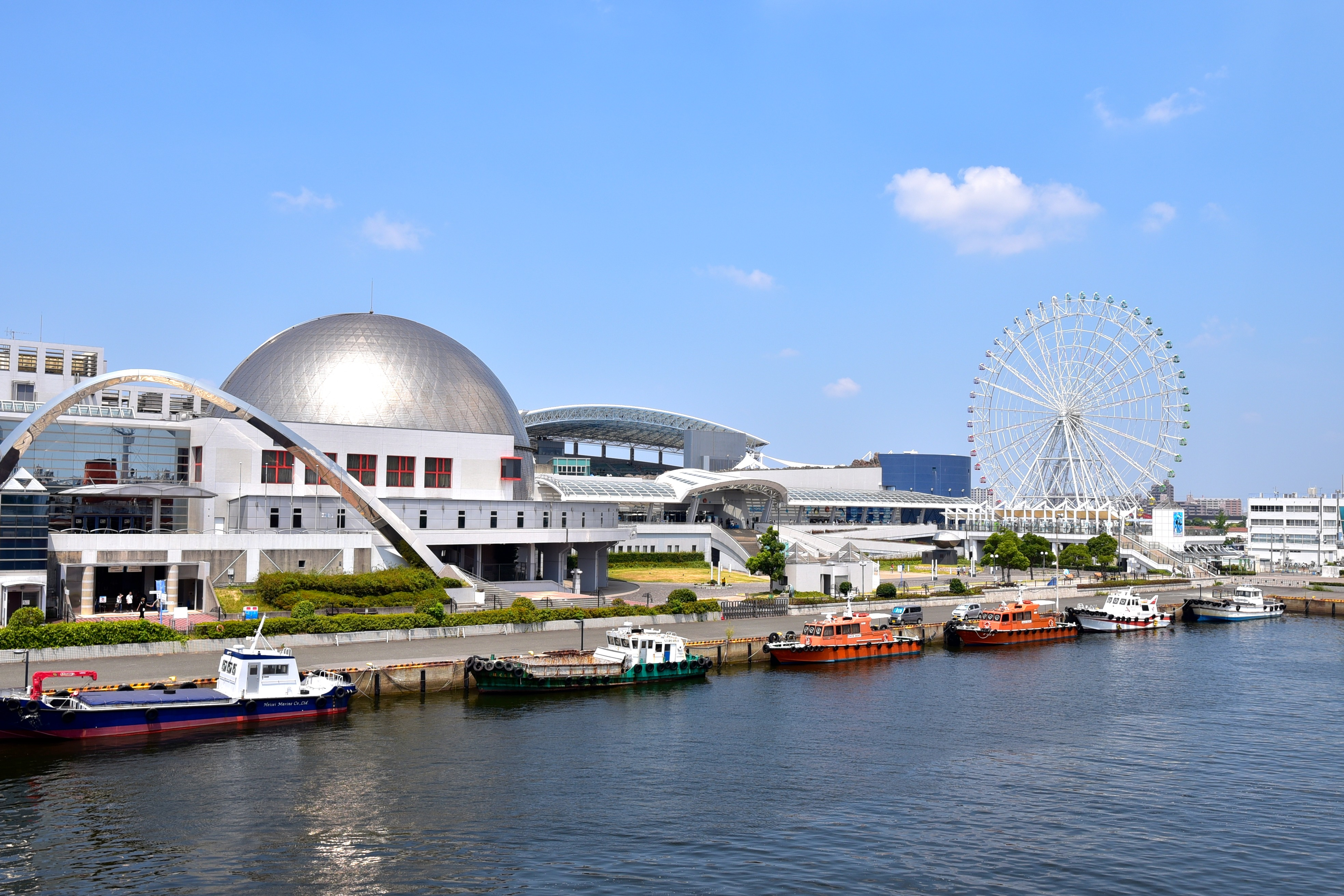
Port of Nagoya Public Aquarium

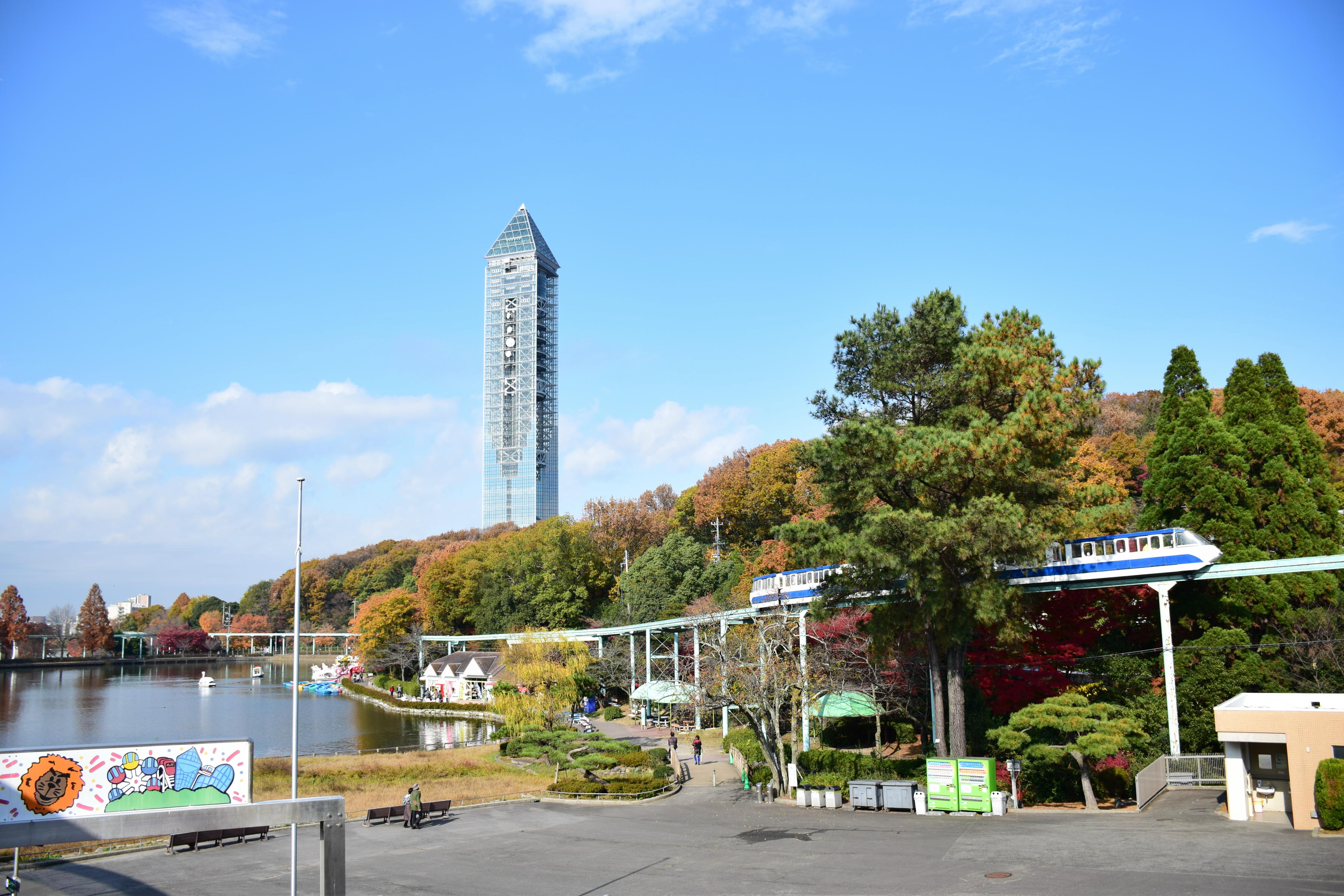
Higashiyama Zoo and Botanical Gardens

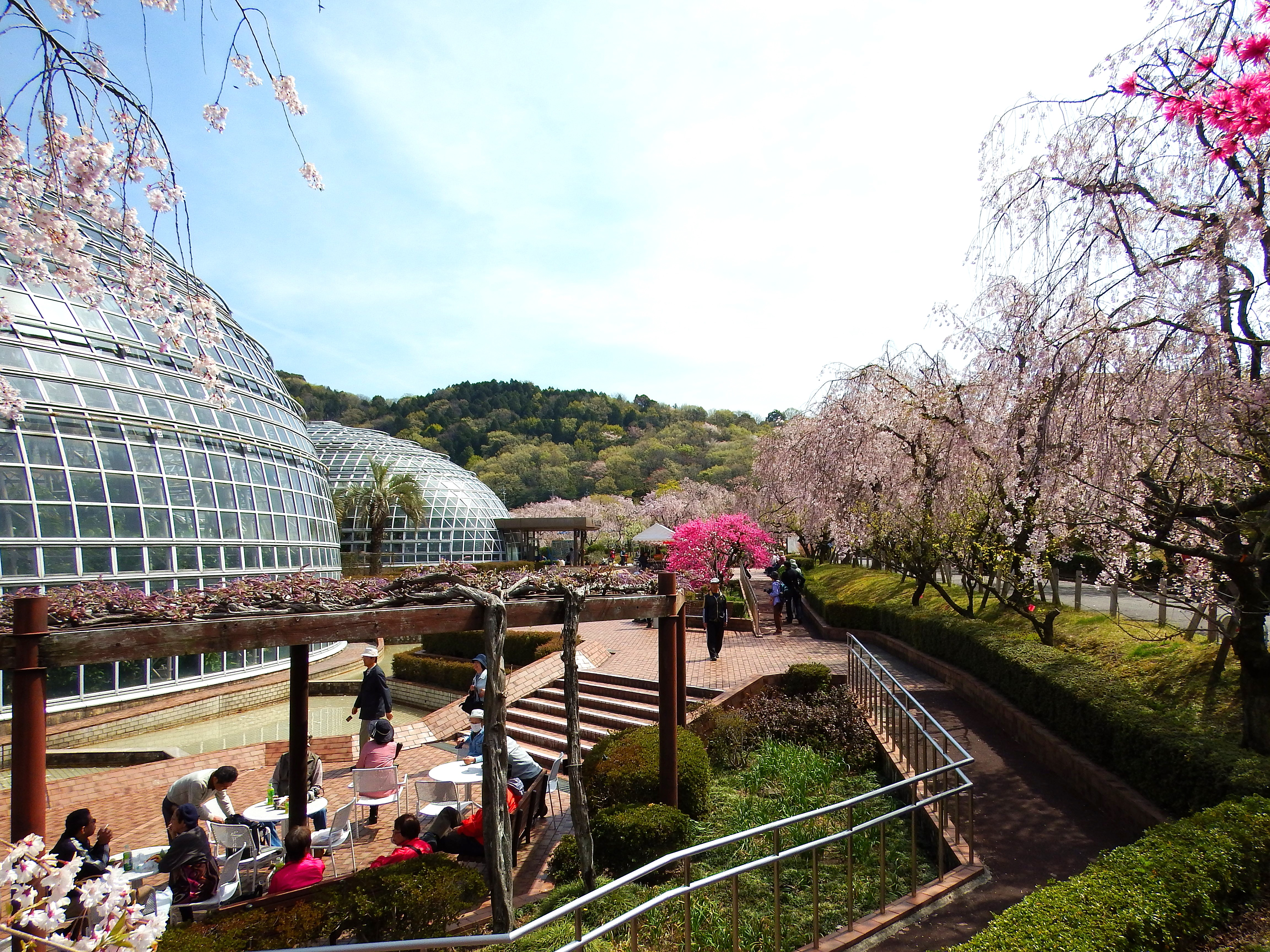
Togokusan Fruits Park

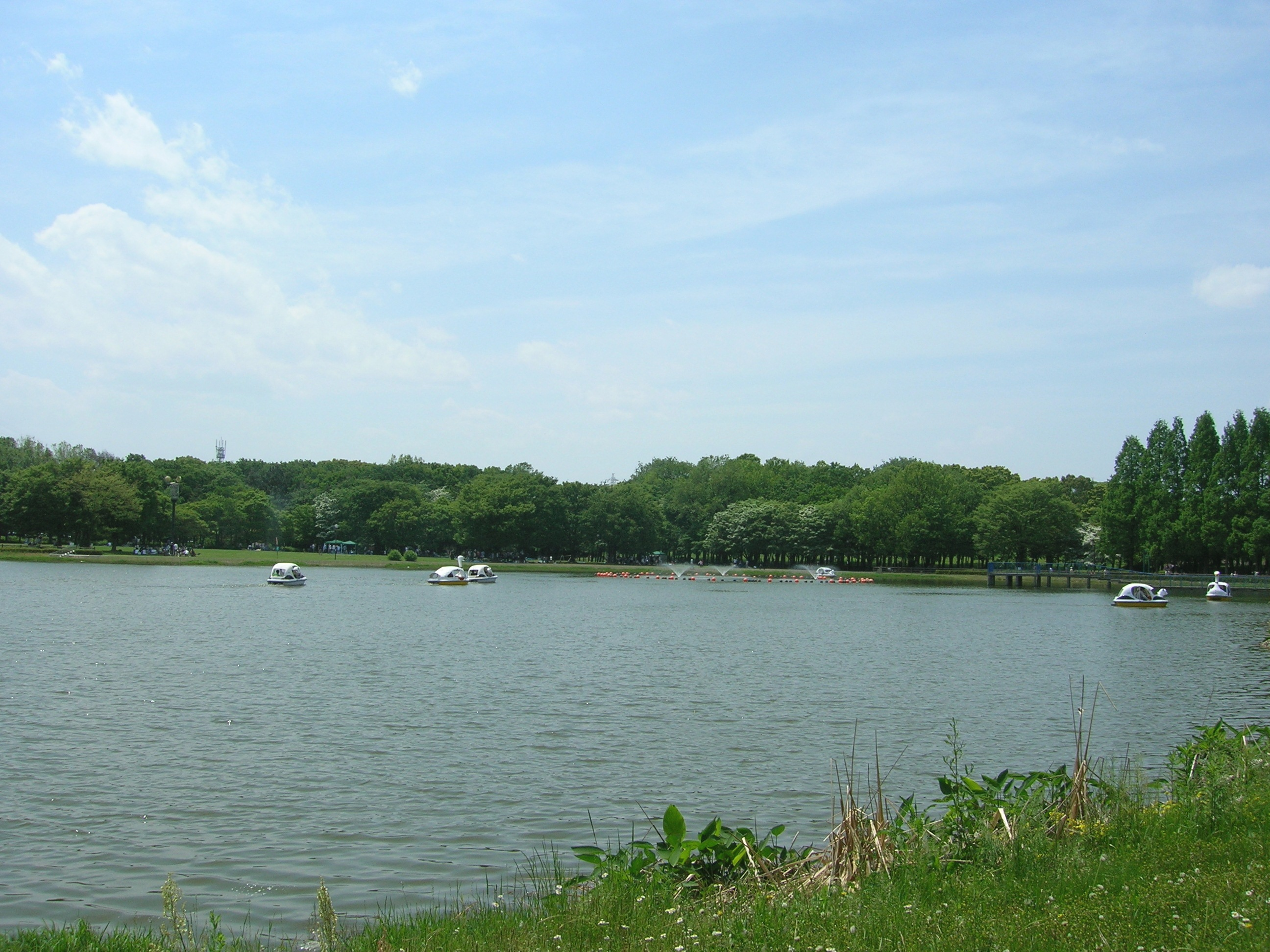
Shōnai Greens

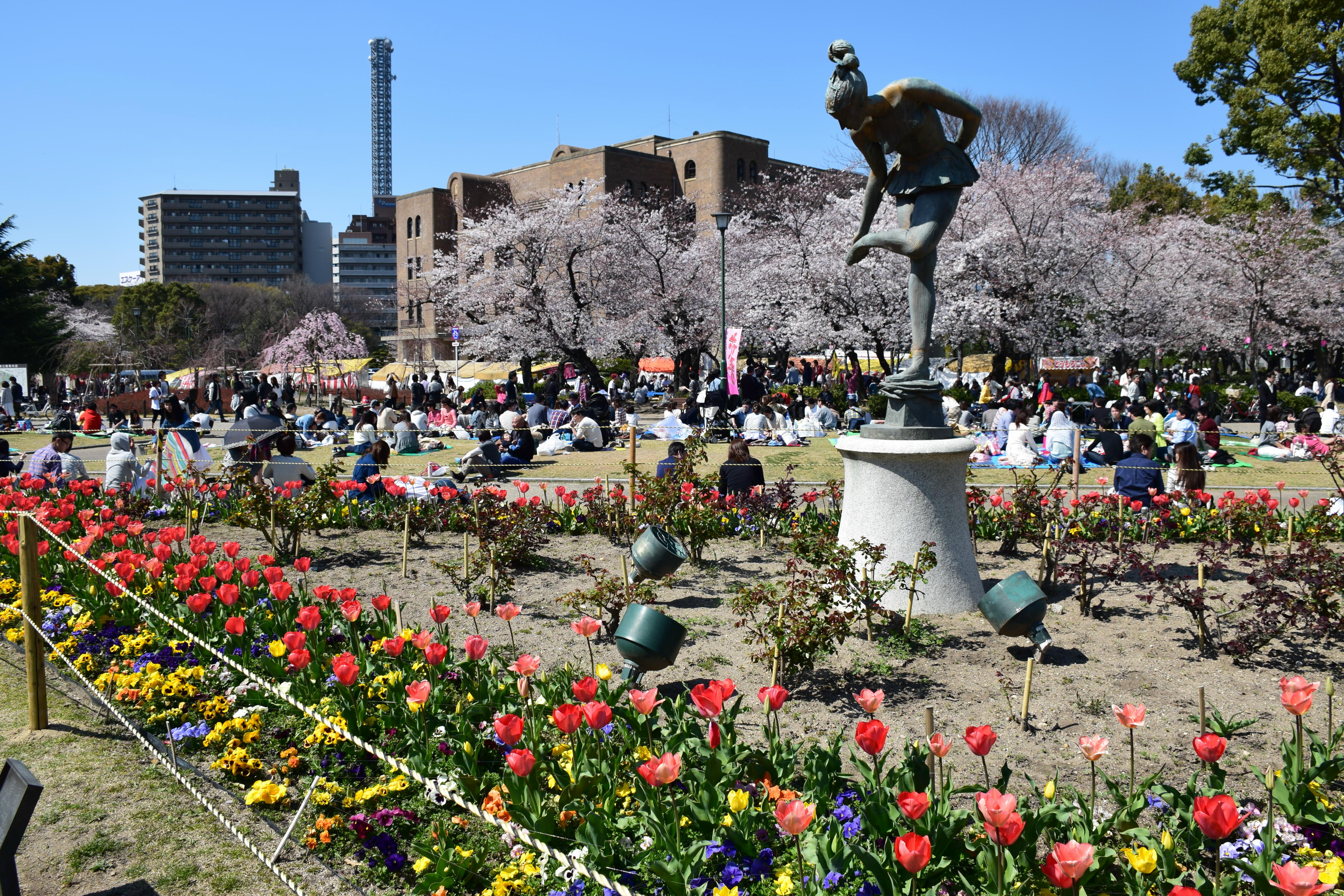
Tsuruma Park

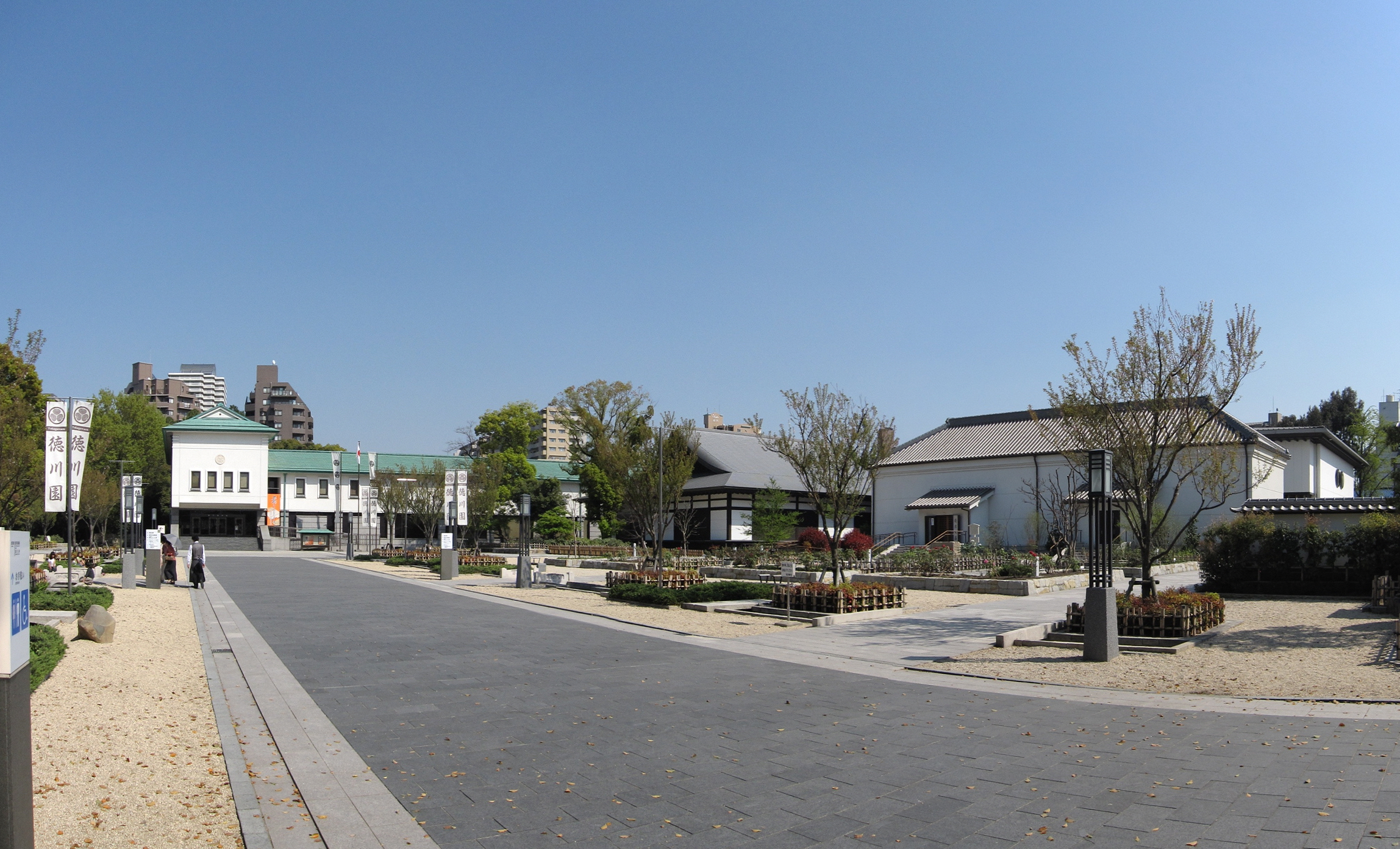
Tokugawa Art Museum

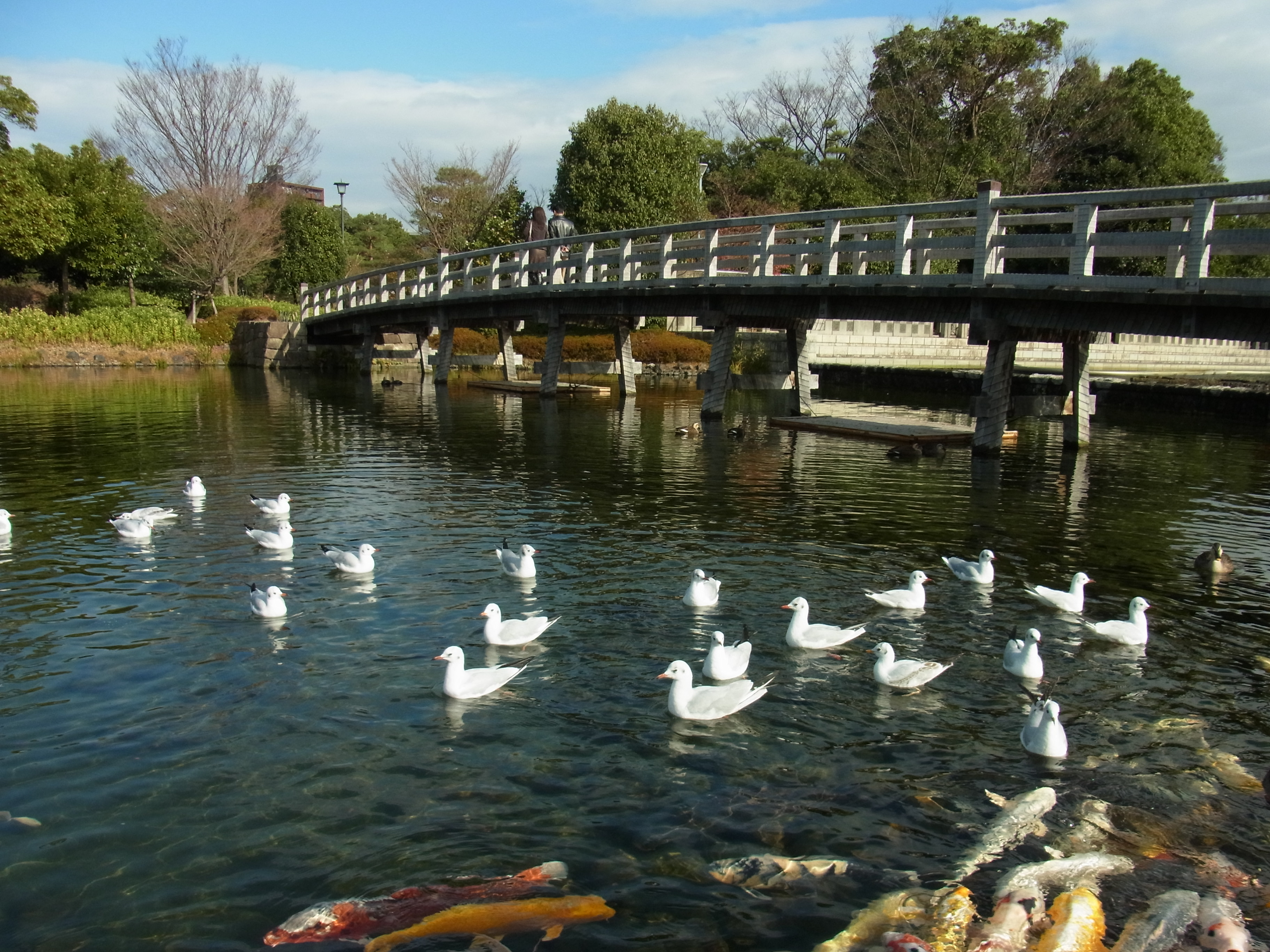
Shirotori Park

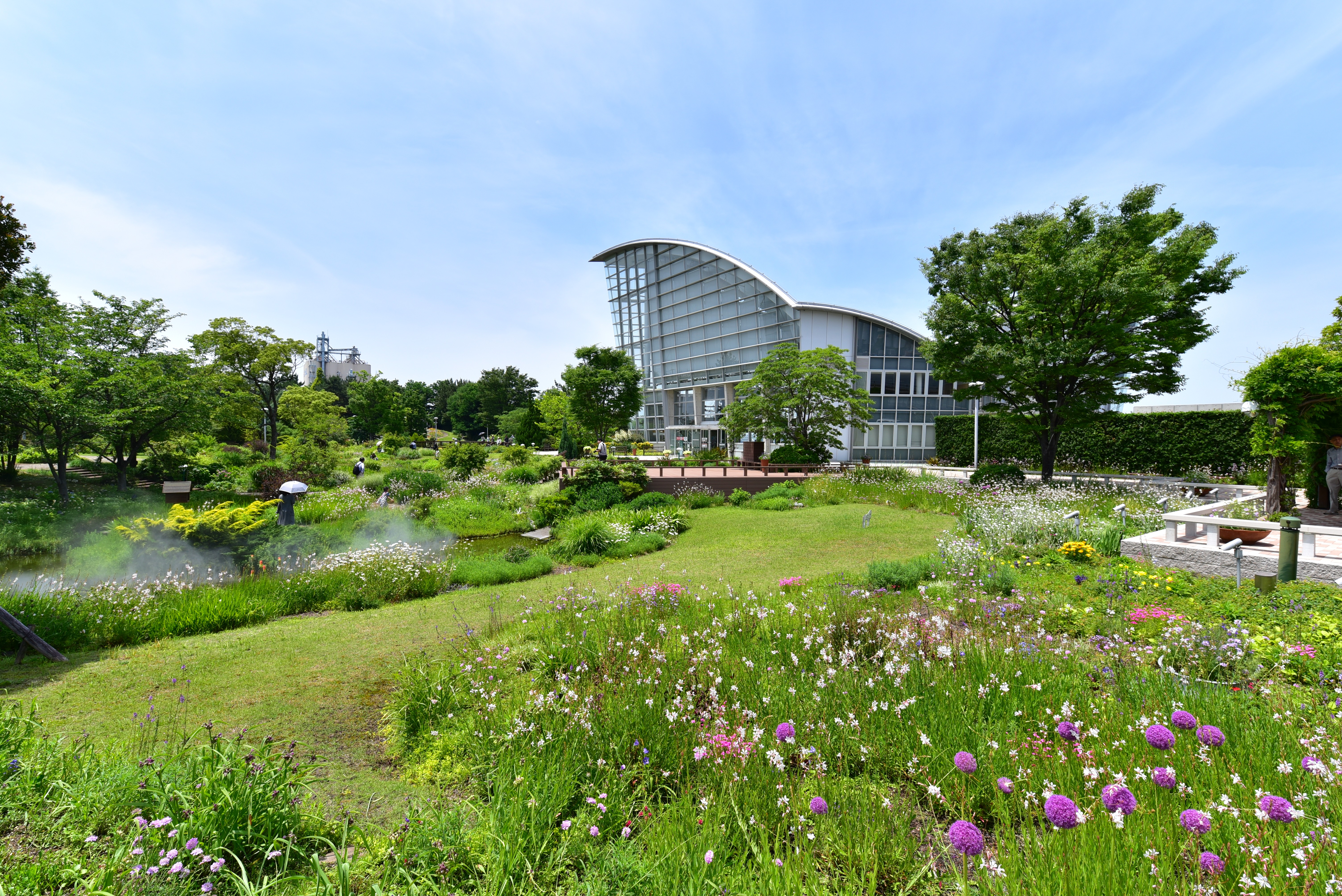
Nagoya Port Wildflower Garden BlueBonnet

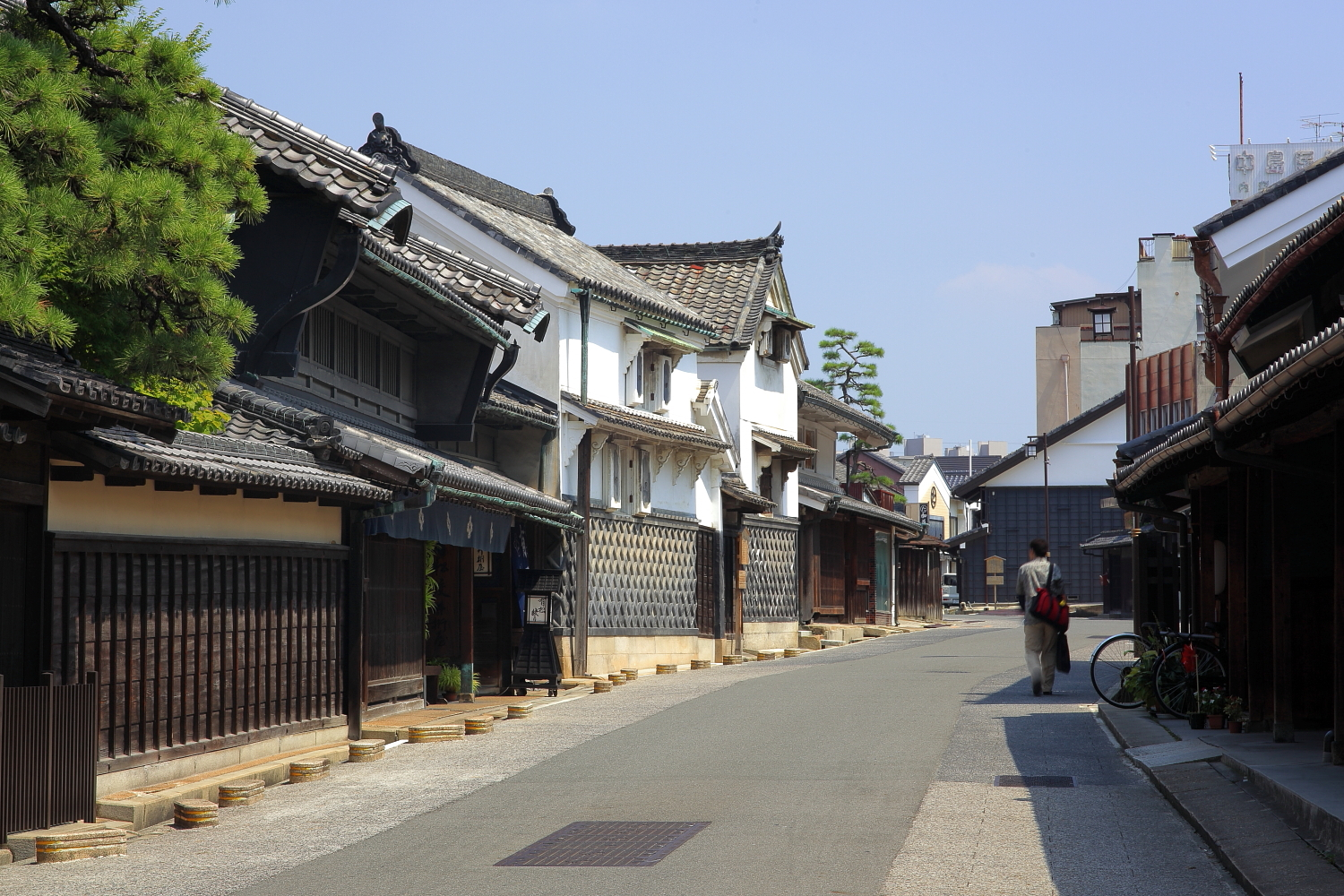
Arimatsu

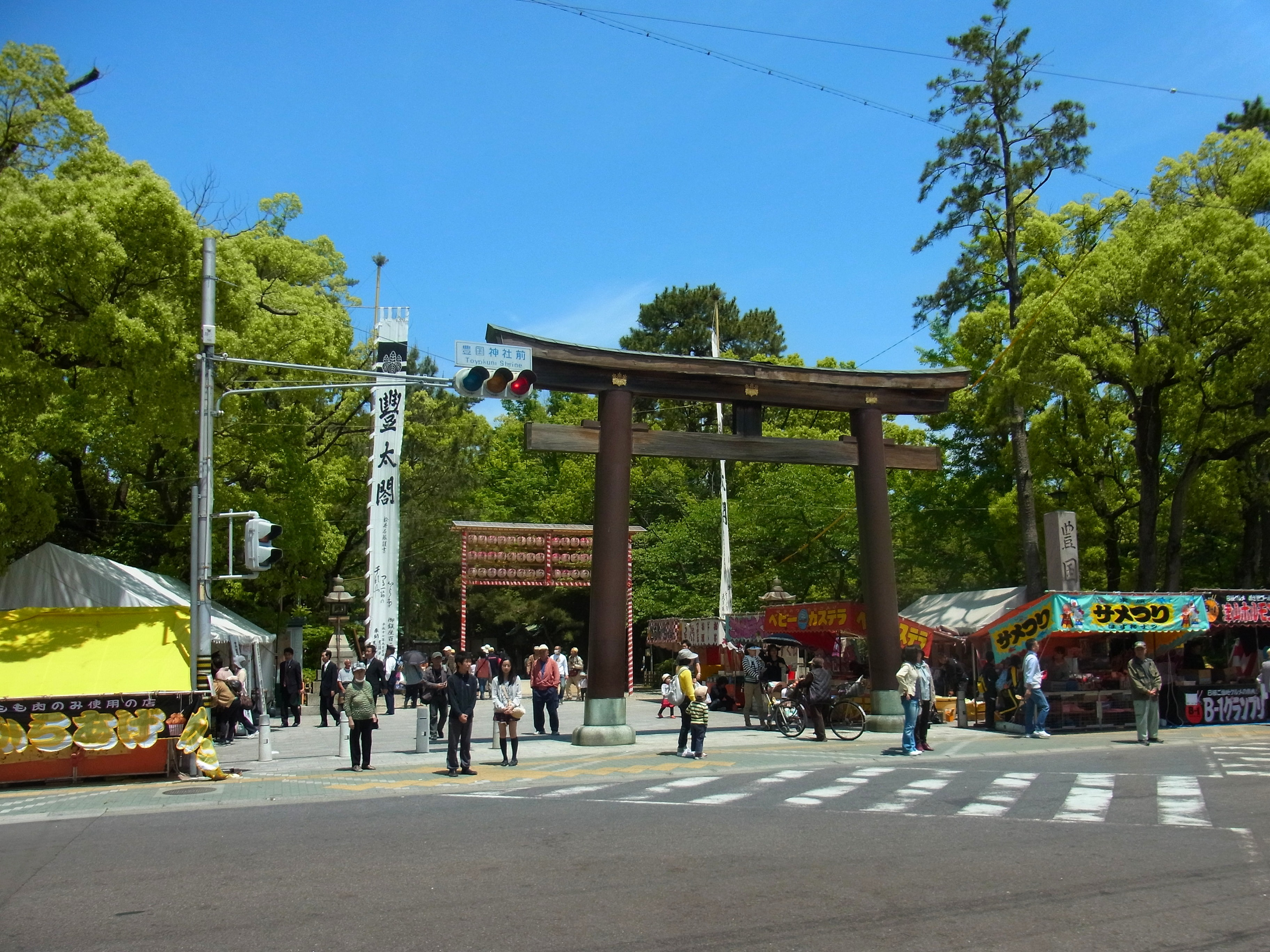
Nakamura Park

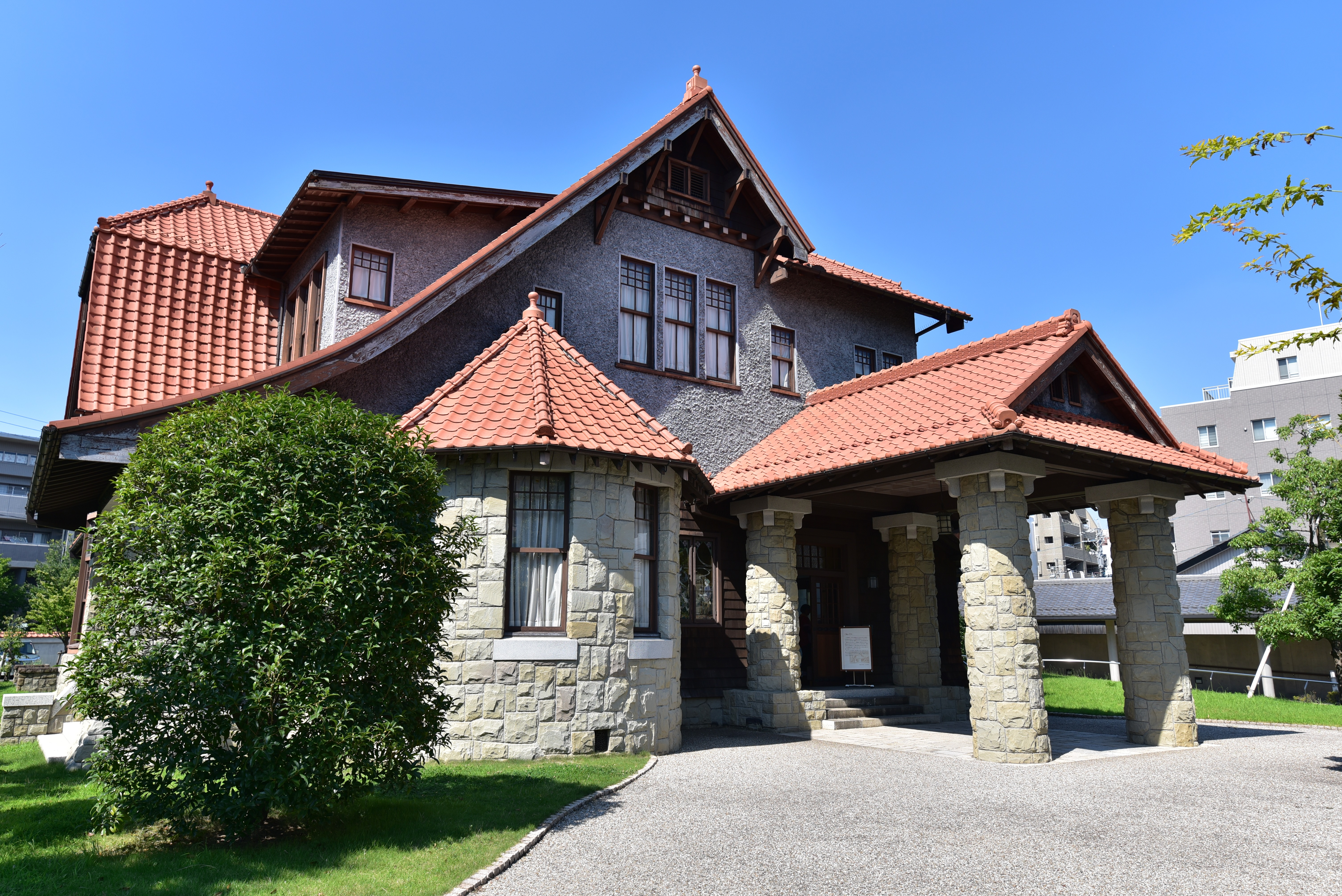
Cultural Path Futaba Museum (The residences of Sada Yacco)

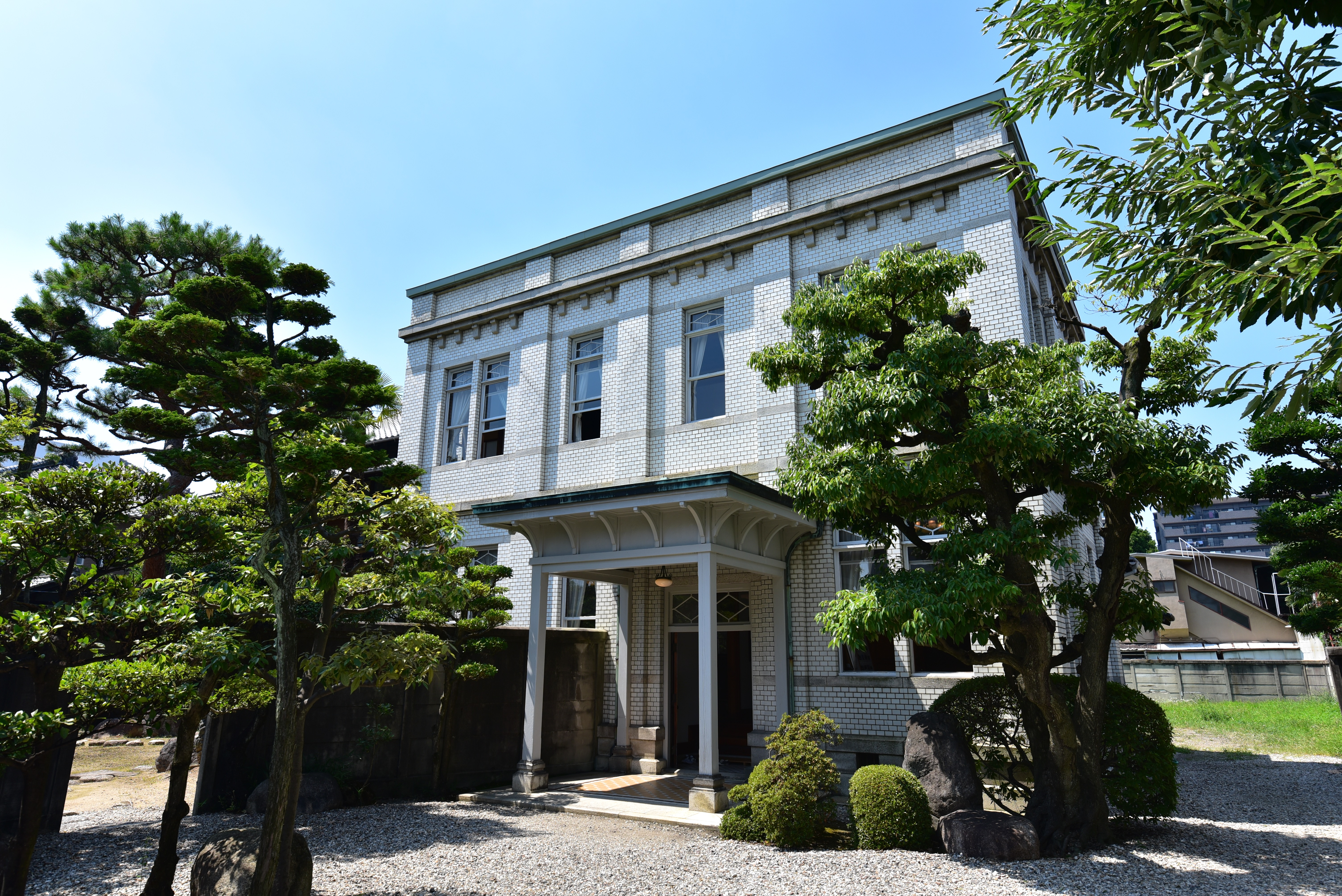
Cultural Path Sasuke Toyoda House

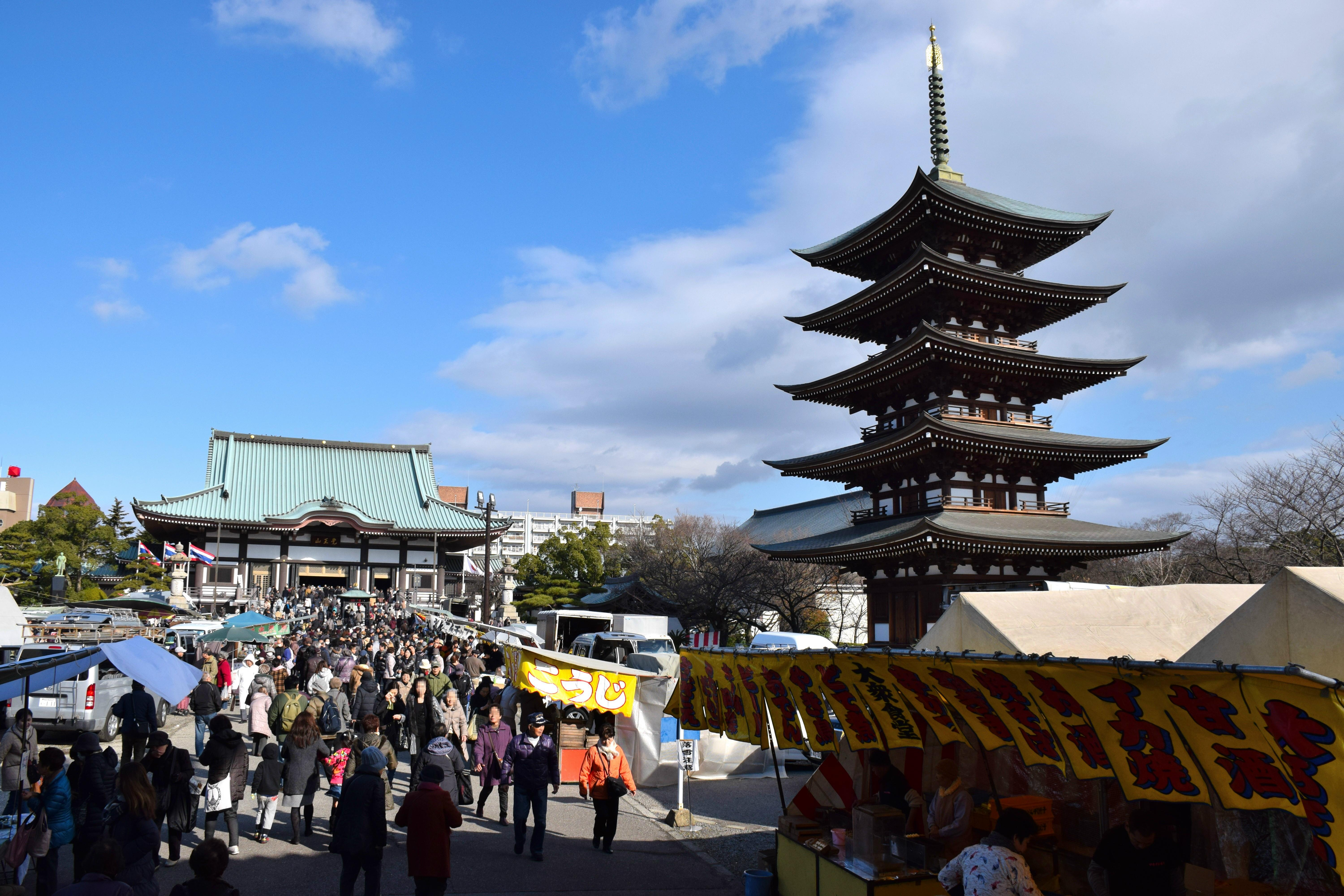
Nittai-ji

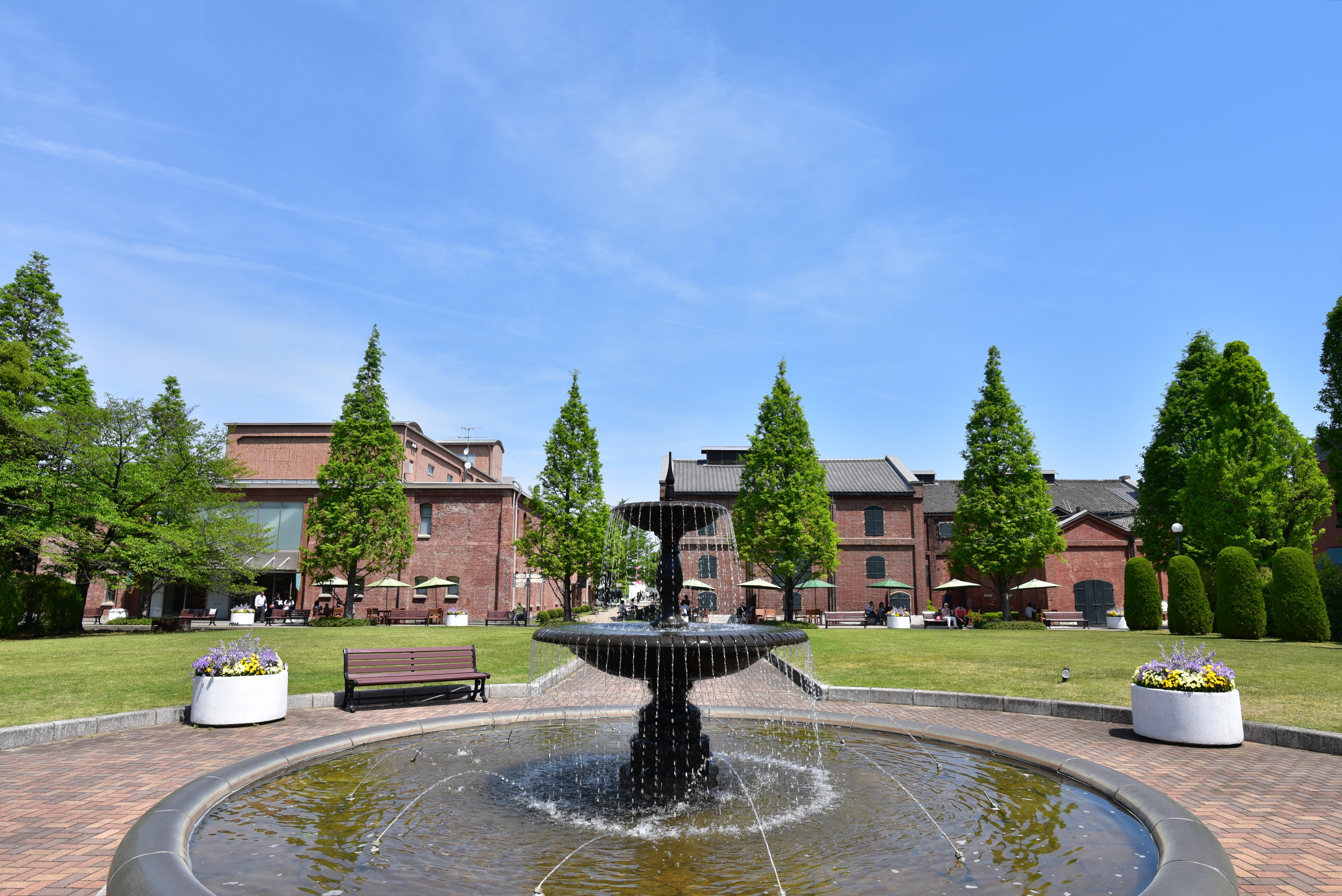
Noritake Garden

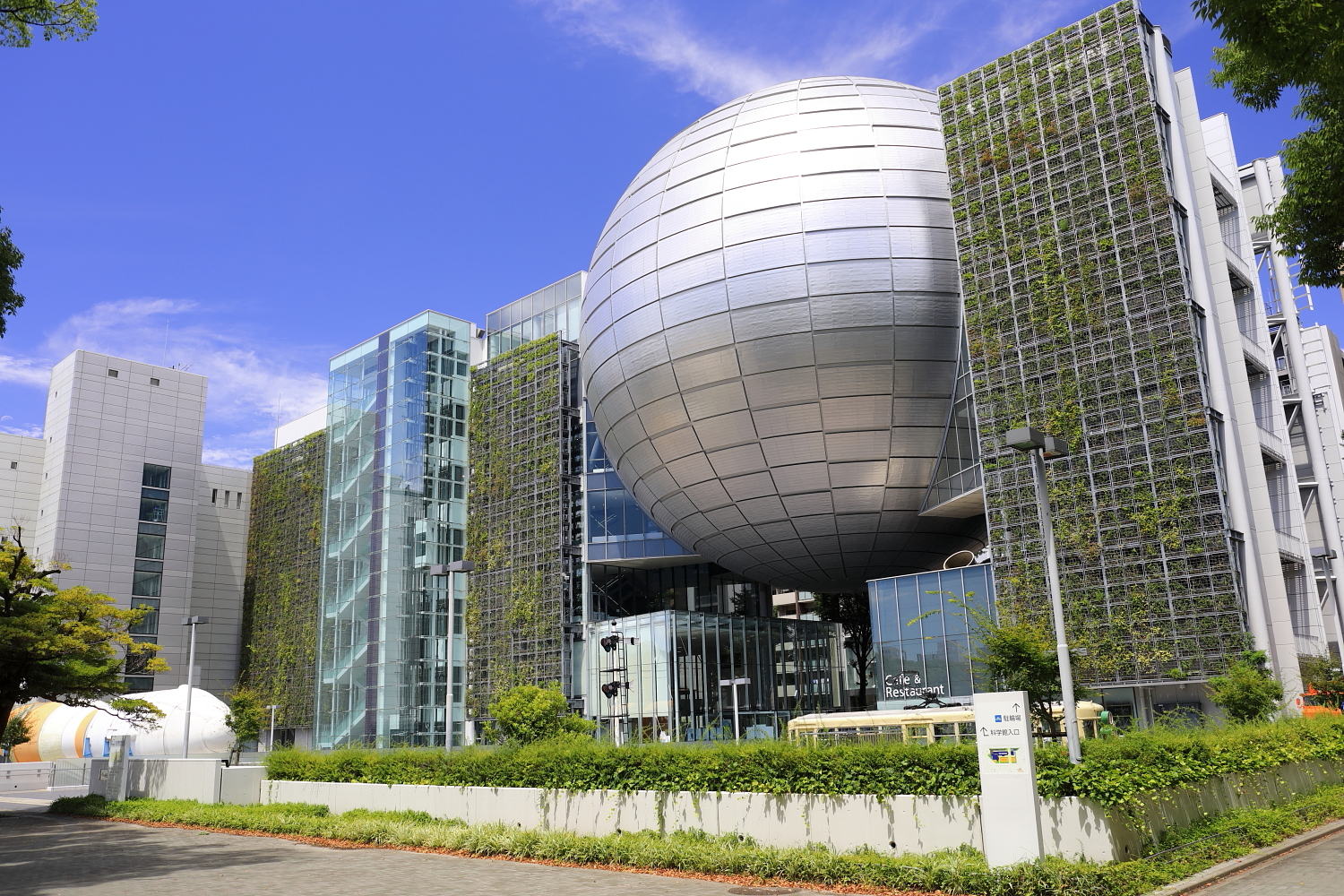
Nagoya City Science Museum

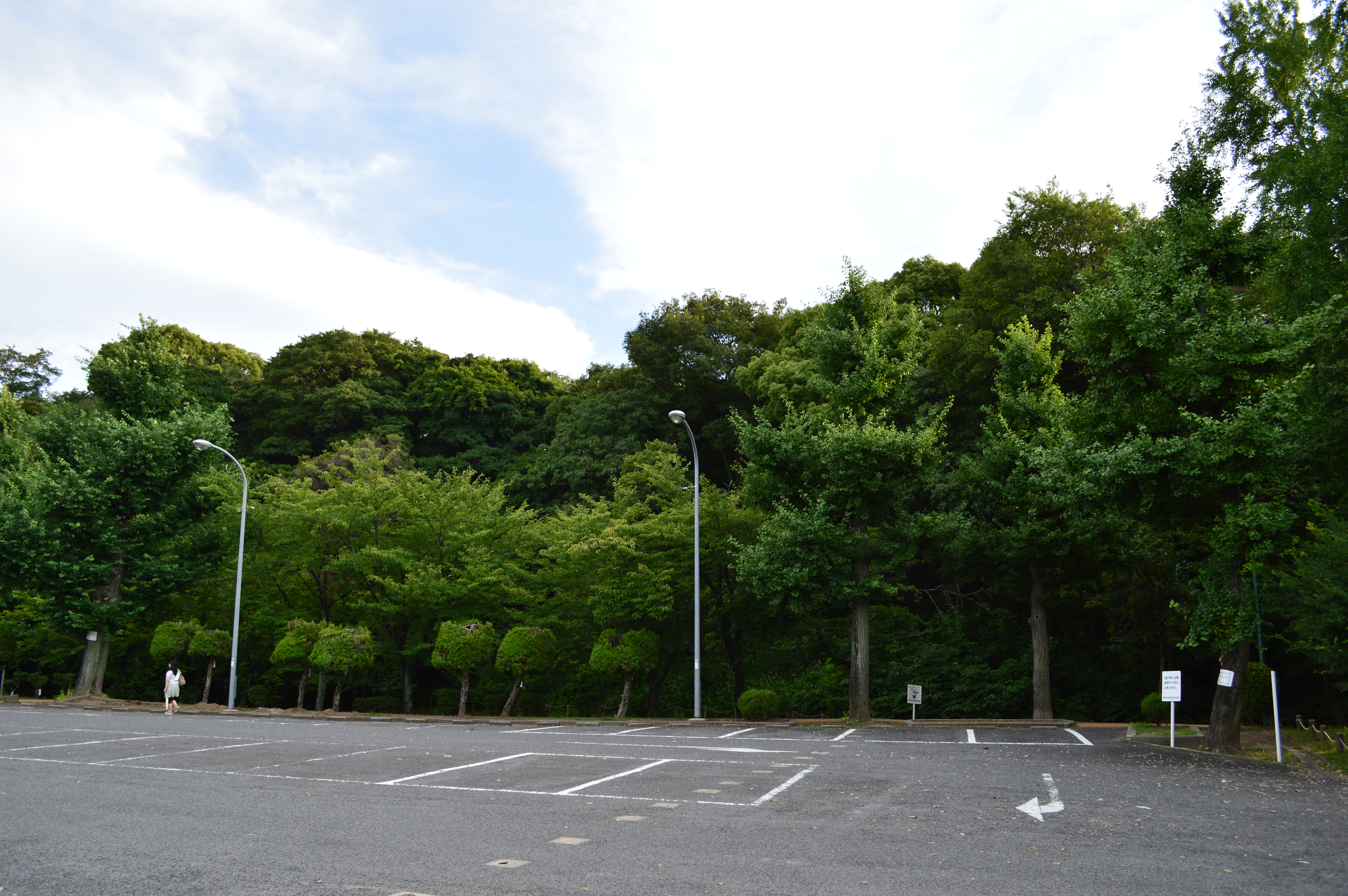
Danpusan Kofun

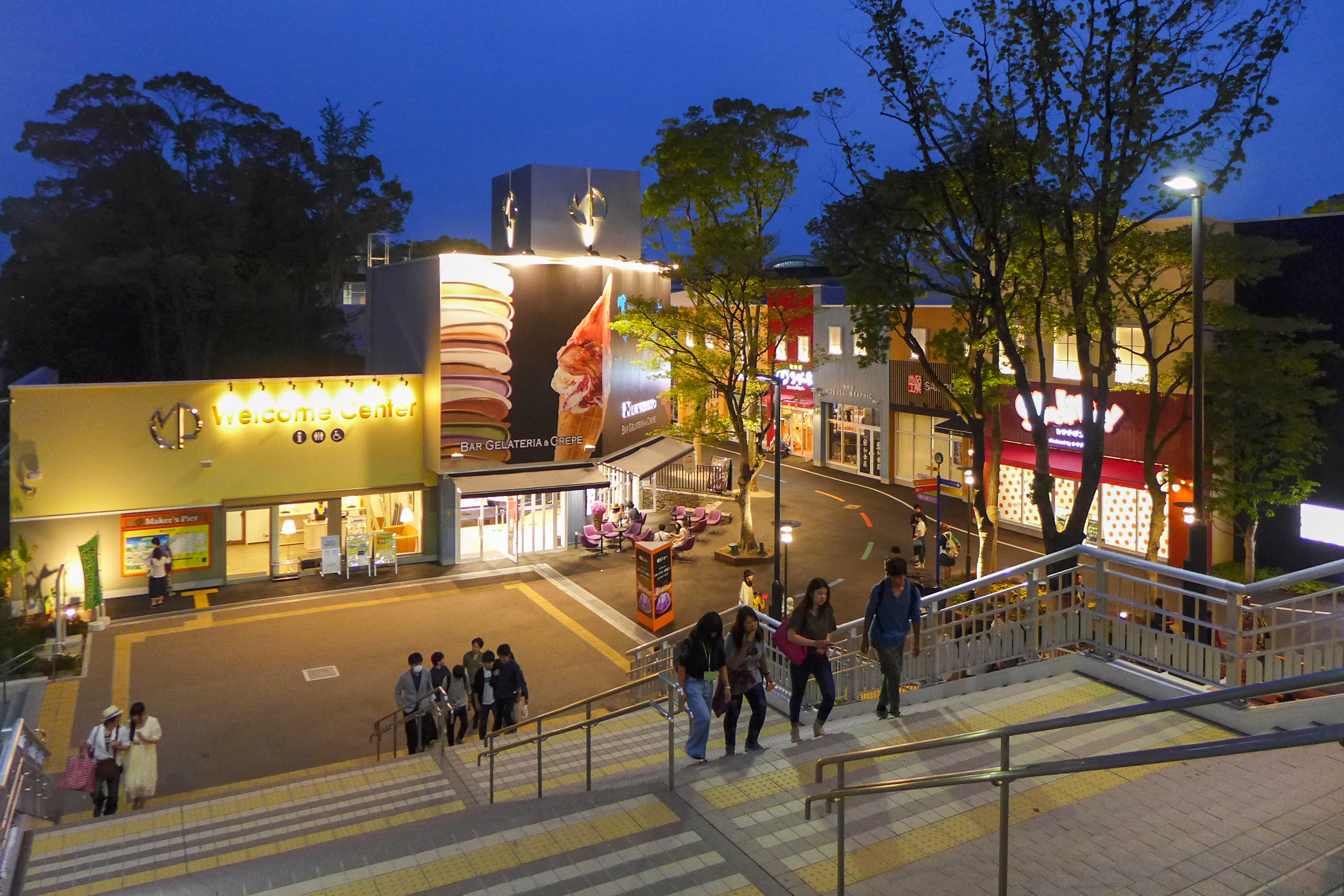
Maker's Pier

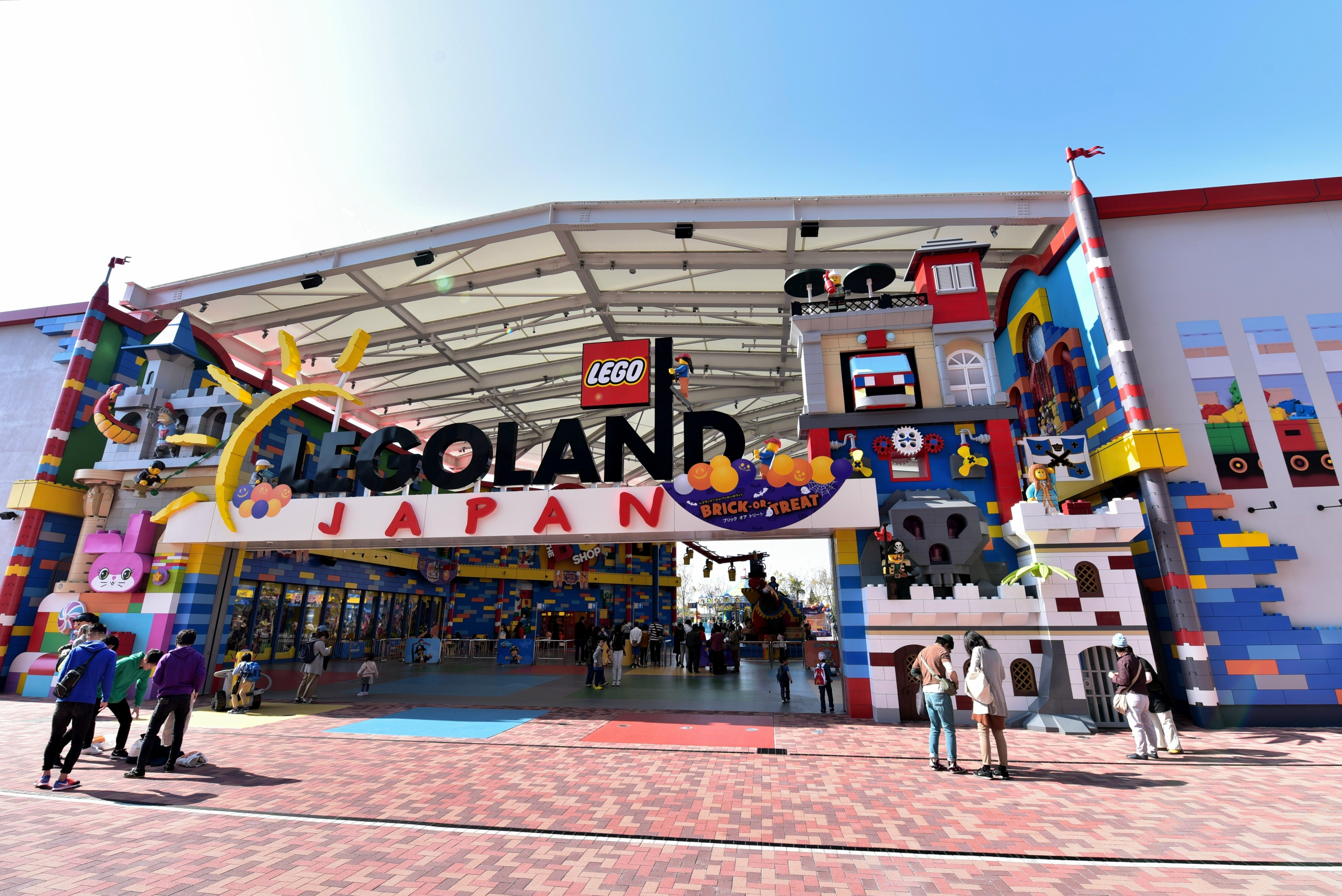
Legoland Japan

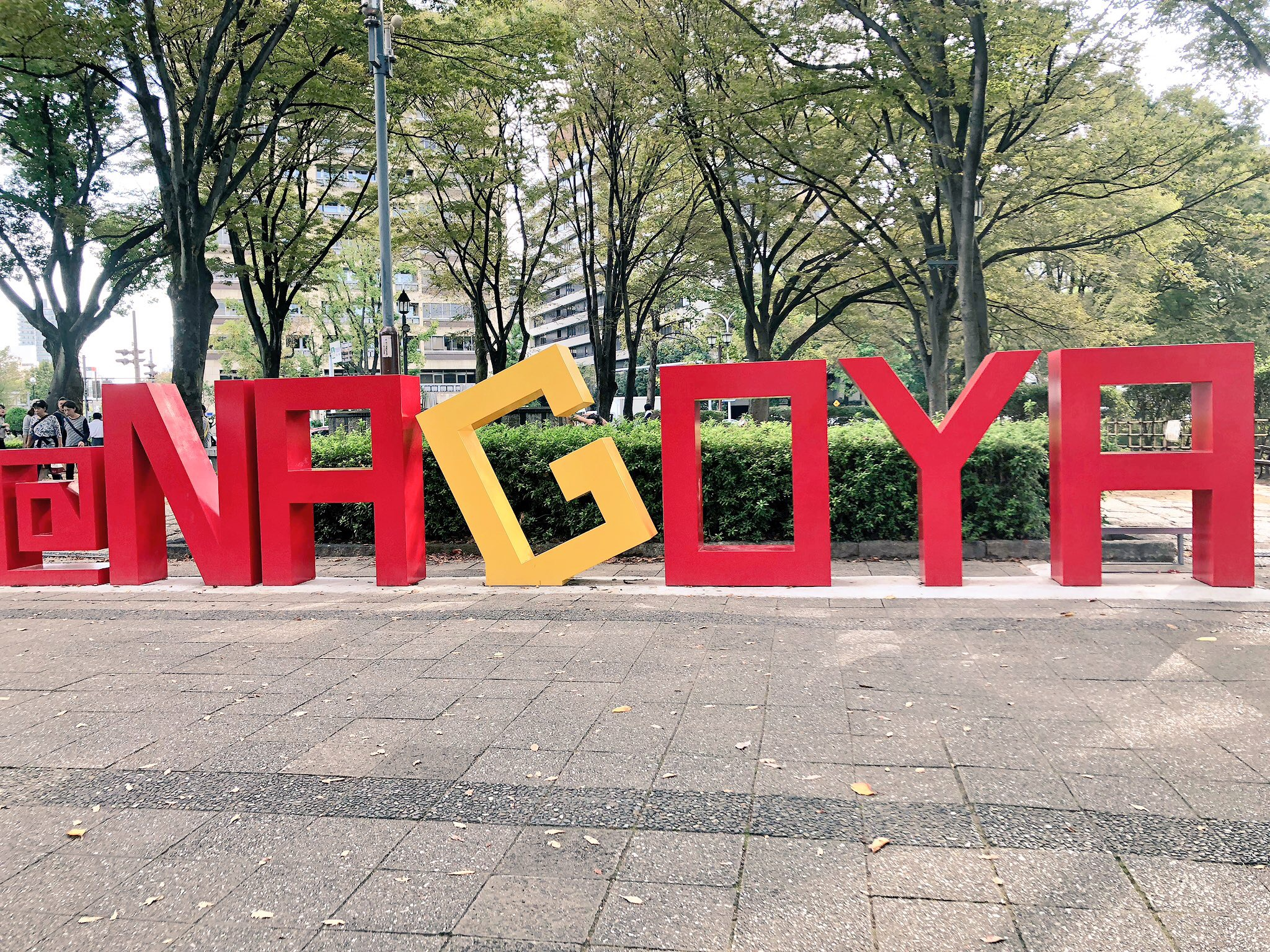
@NAGOYA(Sannomaru)

=== Surrounding area ===
Nagoya is a convenient starting point for visits to the surrounding area in Aichi, such as

- Ghibli Park
- Inuyama – Meiji Mura, Little World Museum of Man
- Toyota – Kōrankei, premier autumn foliage spots
- Himakajima, Mikawa-wan Quasi-National Park
- Tahara – beaches, Cape Irago
- Toyokawa – Toyokawa Inari
- Obara-mura, famous for shikizakura ("four-seasons-cherry blossom")
- Toyohashi
- Tokoname

Reachable with at most a two-hour journey are

- Gifu Prefecture
  - Takayama – Shirakawa-go
  - Gero Onsen hot spring
  - Gujo Hachiman
  - Magome and Tsumago, the hill stations in the Kiso Valley
- Mie Prefecture
  - Ise Shrine
- Shizuoka Prefecture
  - Hamamatsu

== Culture ==
Nagoya was a major trading city and political seat of the Owari lords, the most important house of the Tokugawa clan. They encouraged trade and the arts under their patronage, especially Tokugawa Muneharu, the 7th lord, who took a keen interest in drama and plays and lived lavishly. Under his rule, actors and actresses began to visit Nagoya. Arts and culture was further supported by the city's wealthy merchants. Culture flourished after the feudal Edo period and the beginning of the Meiji era. During the Pacific War many old buildings and artefacts were destroyed. The region's economic and financial power in the post-war years rekindled the artistic and cultural scene. The city is recognized as a "Design City" by UNESCO.

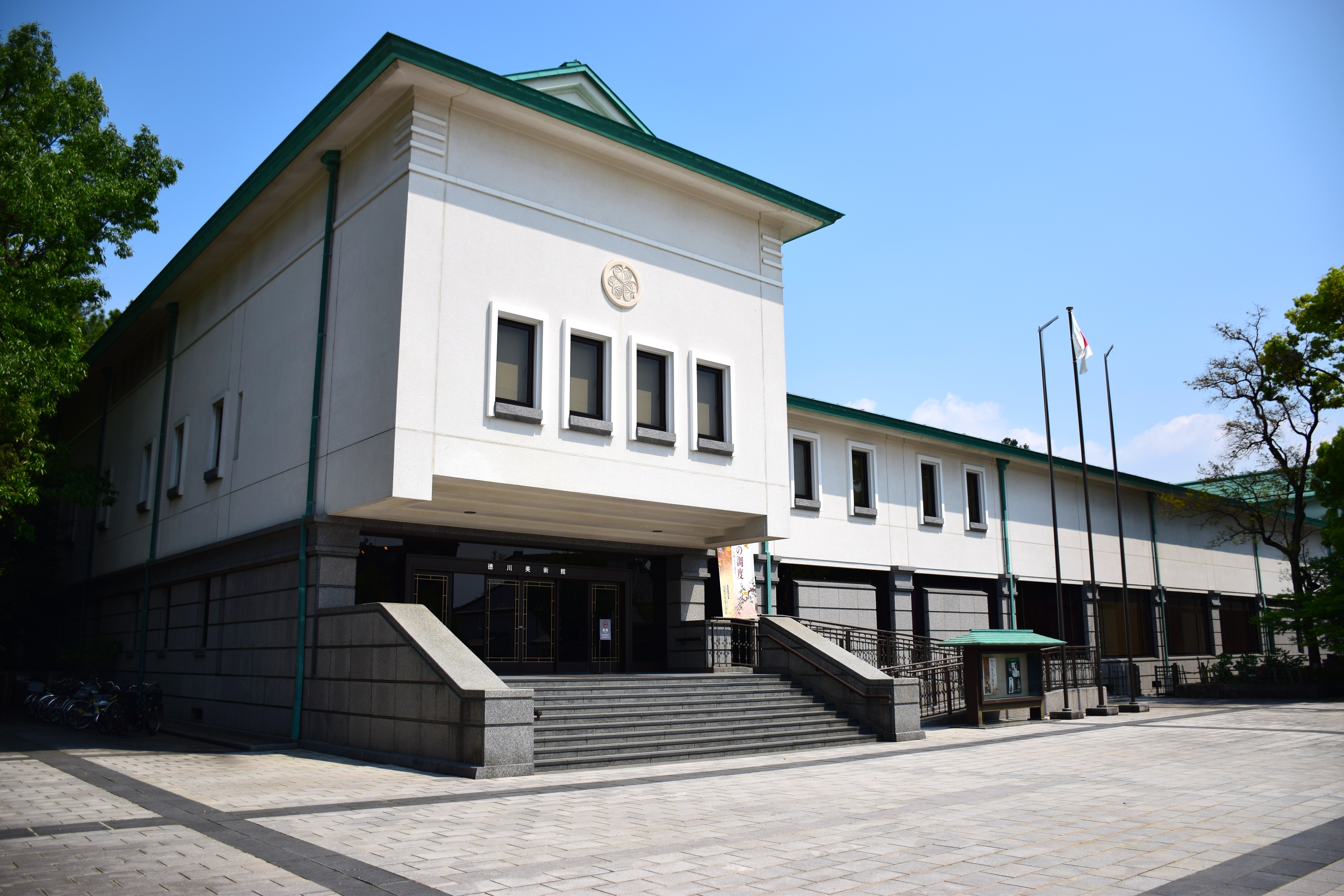
The Tokugawa Art Museum, which houses some of the finest art treasures of Japan

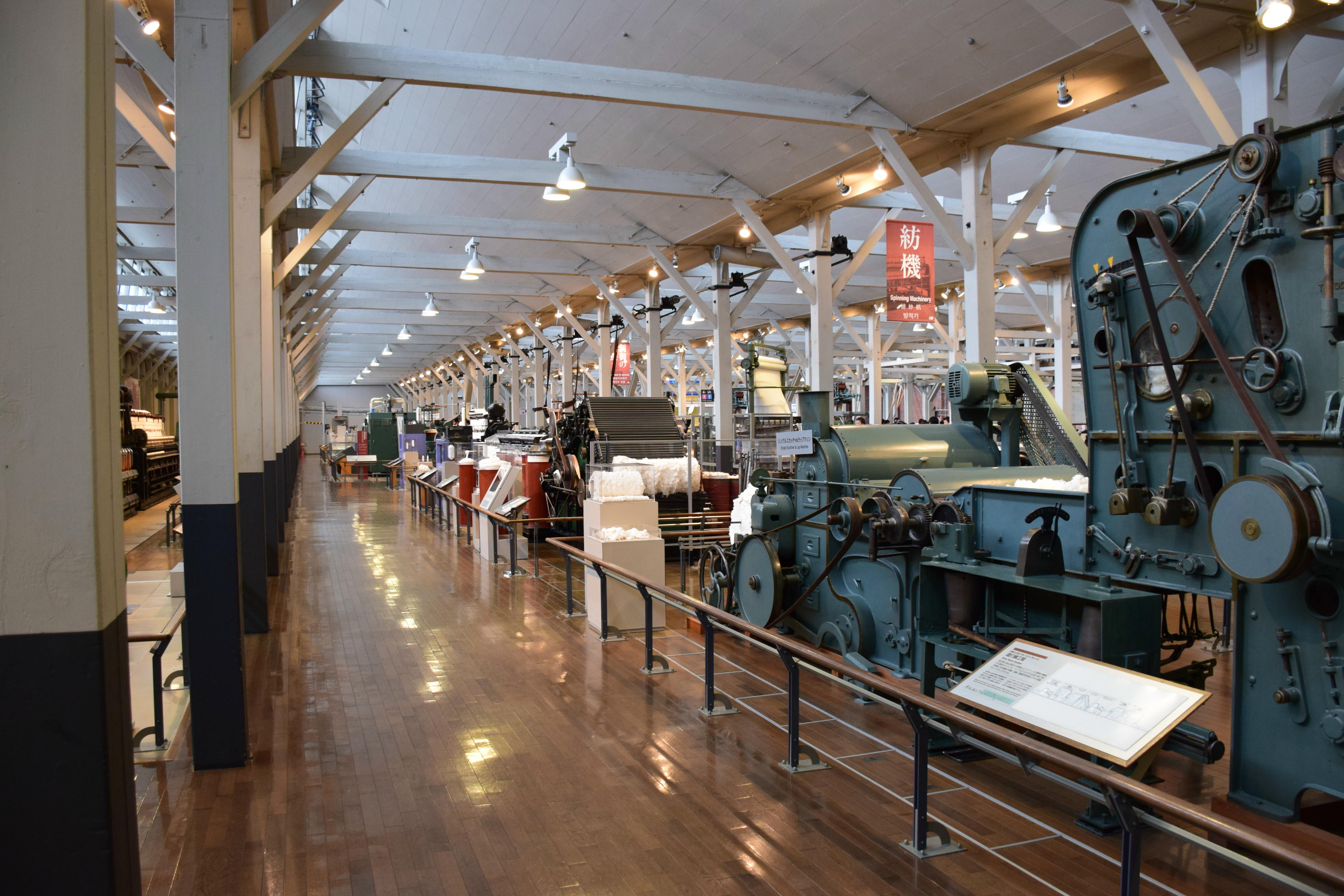
Textile Machinery Pavilion in the Toyota Commemorative Museum of Industry and Technology

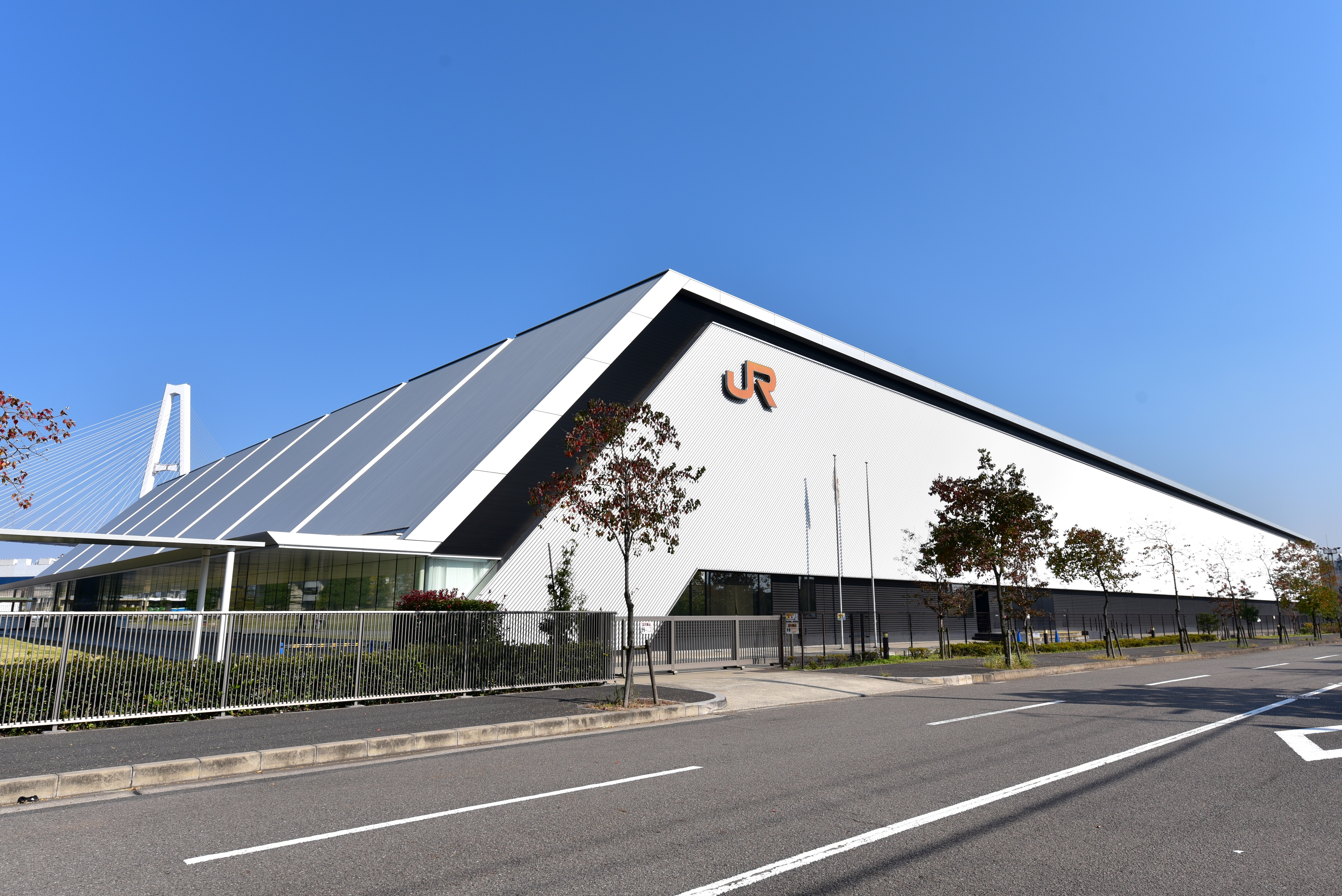
SCMaglev and Railway Park

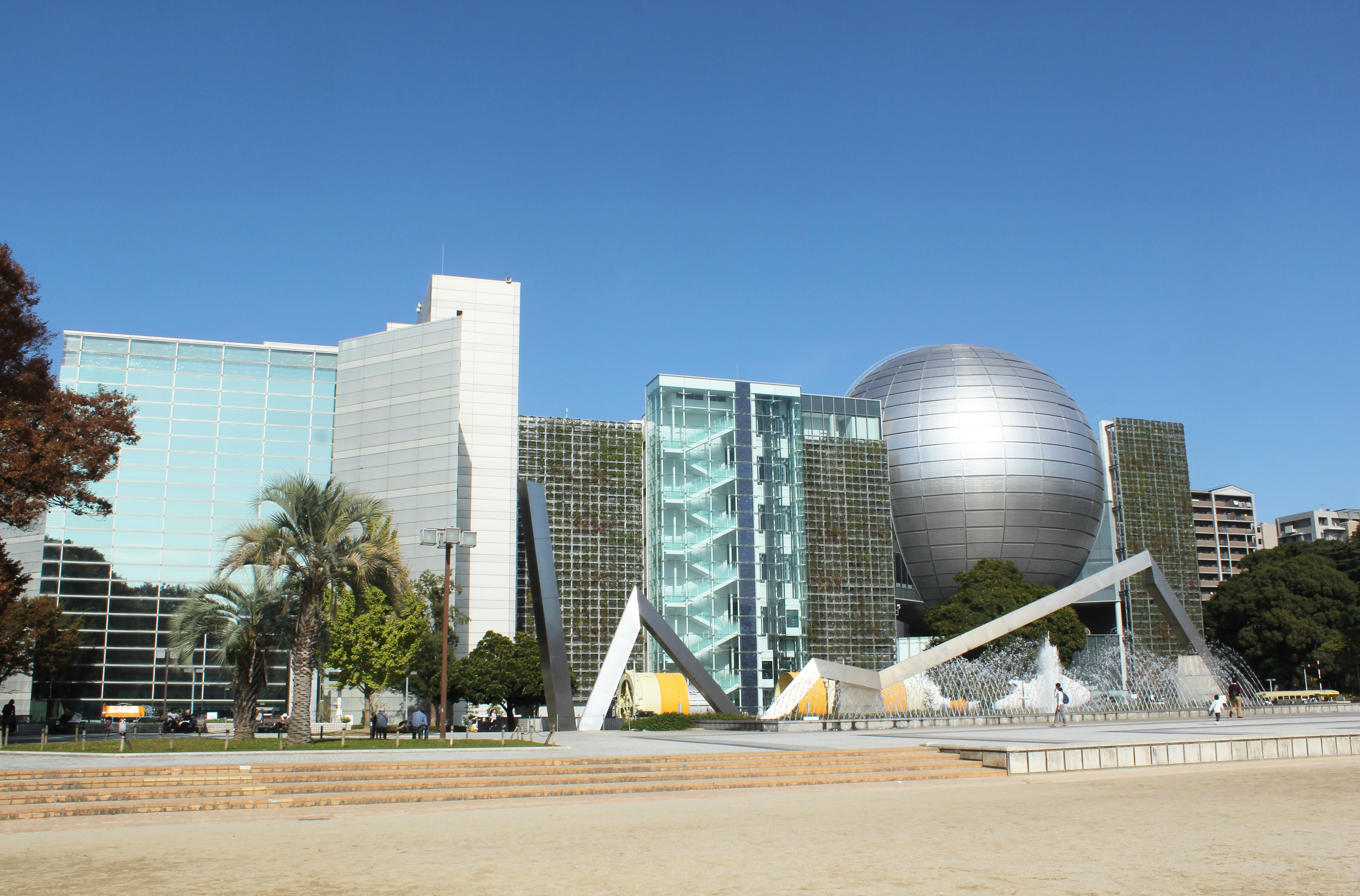
Nagoya City Science Museum

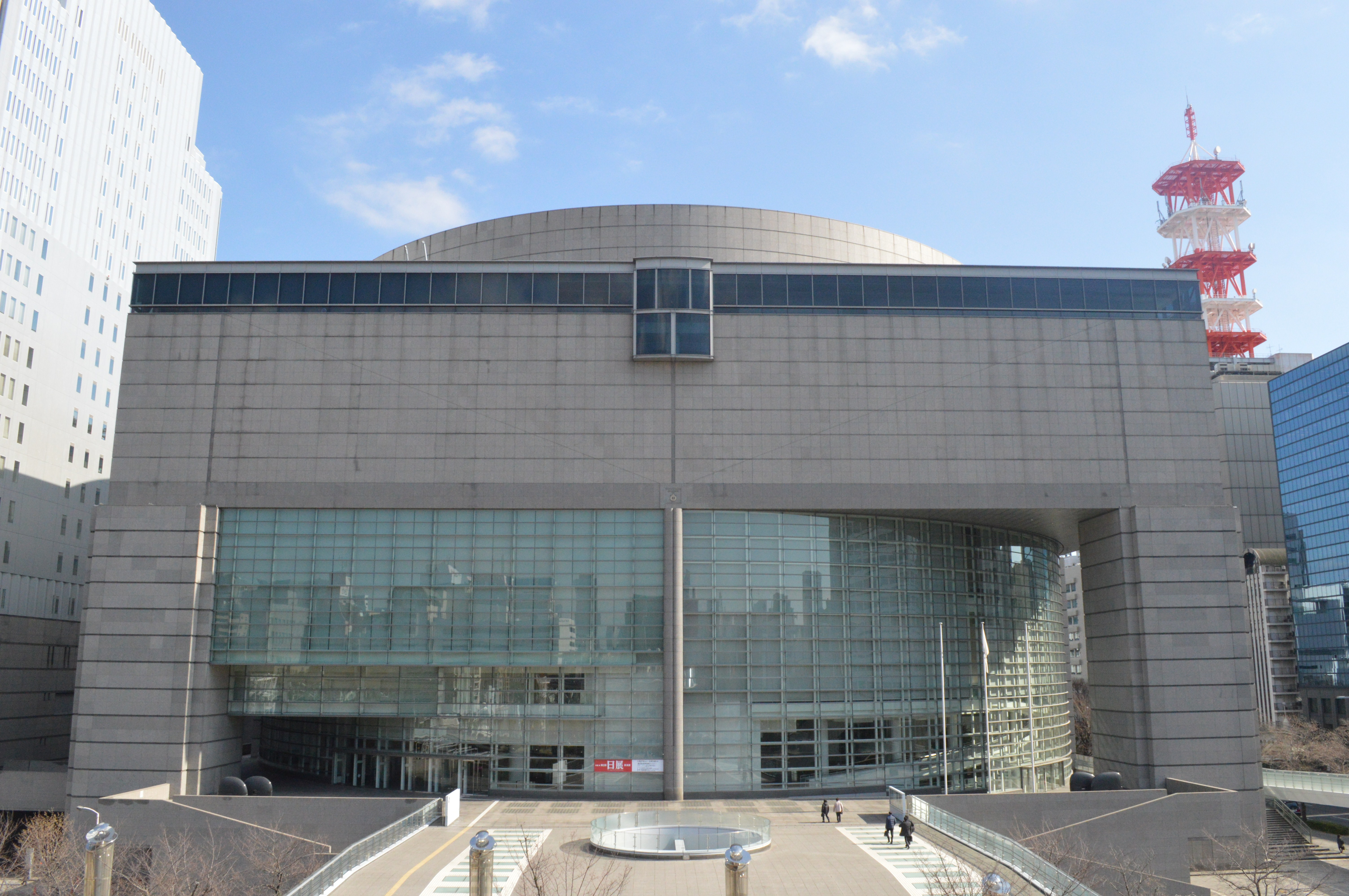
Aichi Arts Center in Sakae

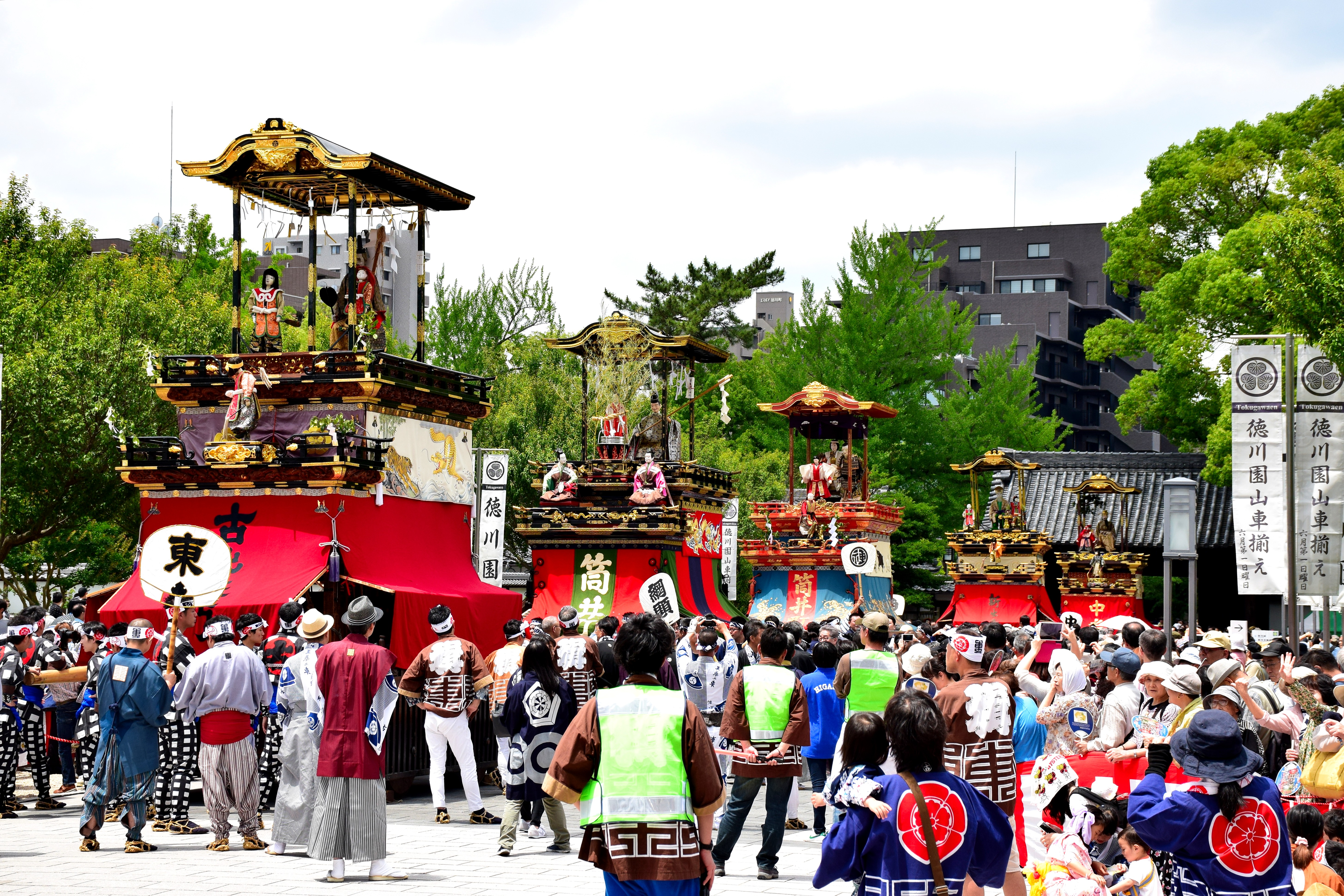
Tsutsui-chō/Dekimachi tennōsai

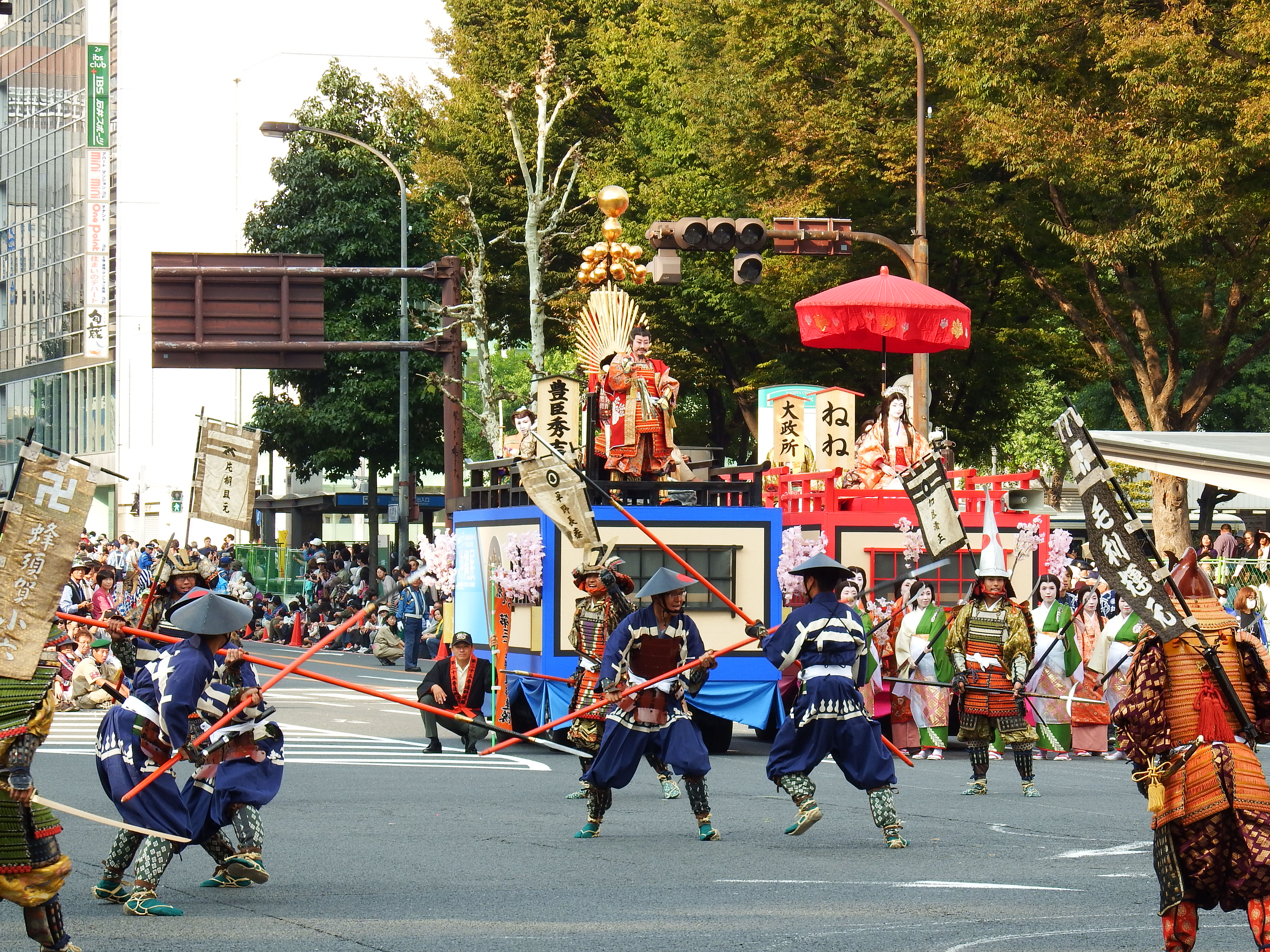
Nagoya matsuri

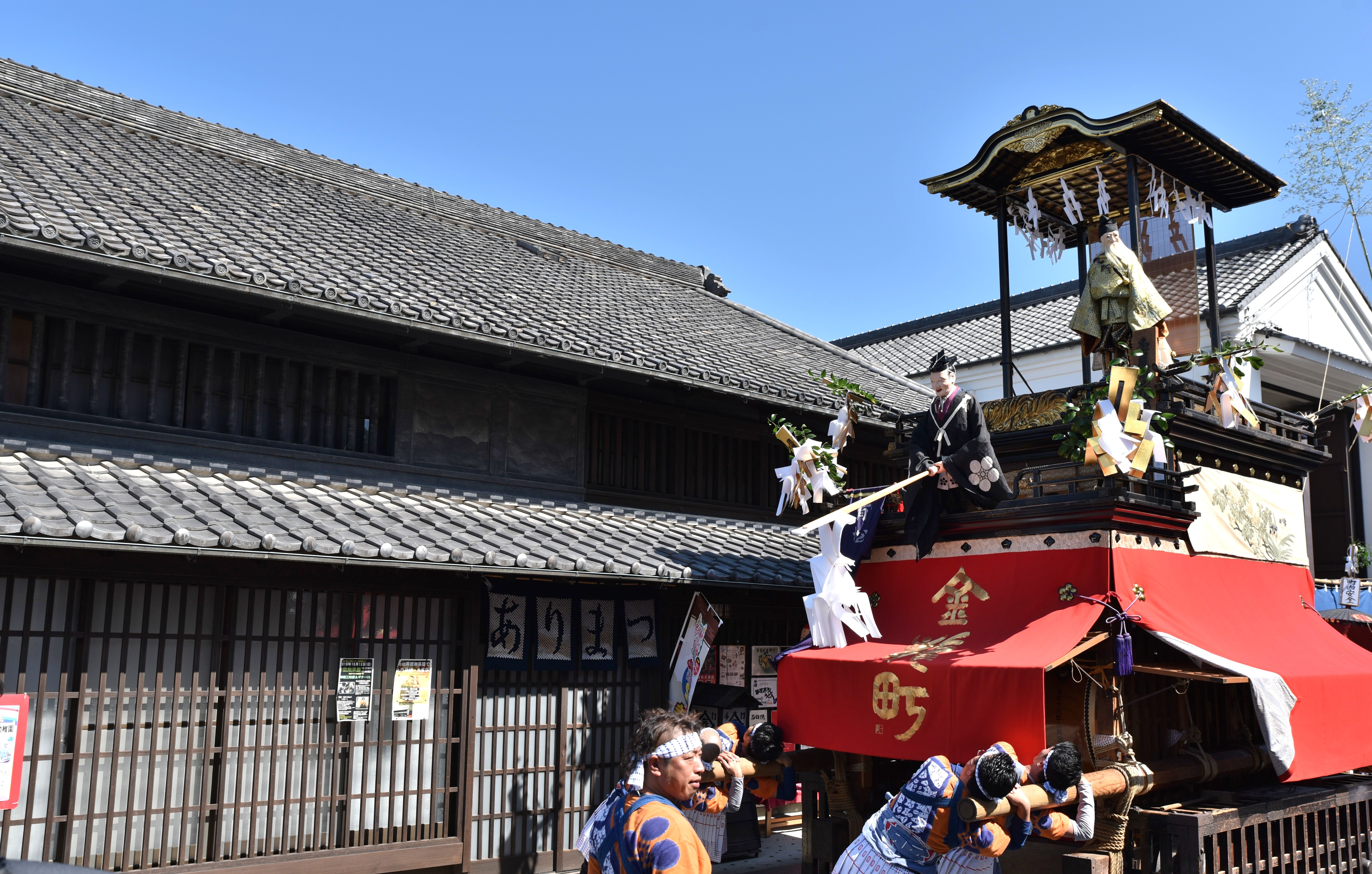
Arimatsu autumn festival

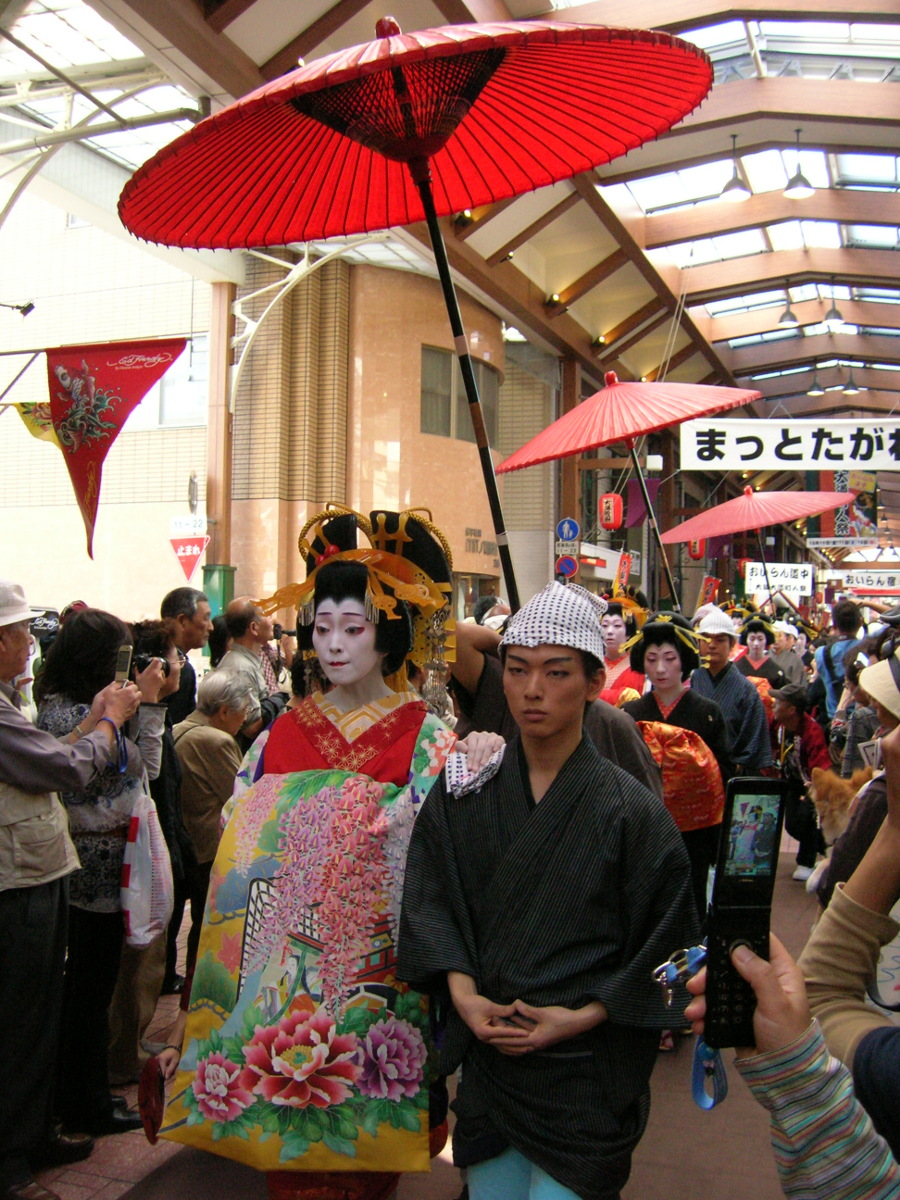
Daidō-chōnin Matsuri in Ōsu

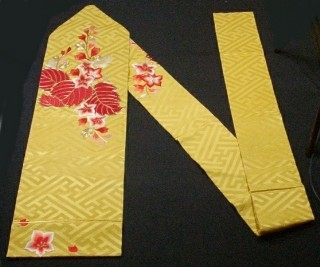
The Nagoya obi, the most popular type for kimono throughout Japan

=== Museums ===
Nagoya has multiple museums, including traditional and modern art, handicrafts to industrial high-tech, natural and scientific museums.

Nagoya Castle's collection is from the Owari Tokugawa era. The main tower is a museum that details the history of the castle and the city. The Honmaru Palace, destroyed in the Pacific War, was reconstructed in 2018; it is a prime example of the Shoin-zukuri architecture of the feudal era. Tokugawa Art Museum is a private museum belonging to the Owari Tokugawa, who lived in Nagoya castle for 16 generations. Among other things, it contains 10 designated national Treasures of Japan, including some of the oldest scrolls of The Tale of Genji. The Nagoya Noh Theatre houses various precious objects of Noh theatre. The Nagoya City Museum showcases the history of the town.

Yōki-sō is a villa and gardens located in Chikusa-ku, close to Nittai-ji. It was constructed in the Taishō era for Ito Jirozaemon Suketami XV, the first president of Matsuzakaya.

Paintings and sculpture are exhibited at the Nagoya City Art Museum. The museum's annual report notes that it has presented photography exhibitions and undertaken collecting activity since opening in 1988. A history of photography in the city is covered in Photography in Nagoya.

Modern art is displayed at the Aichi Arts Center. The Aichi Arts Center also is the venue of rotating exhibitions.

The art of porcelain and ceramics can be seen at the Noritake Garden. Toyota has two museums in the city, the Toyota Automobile Museum which shows vintage cars, and the Toyota Commemorative Museum of Industry and Technology, which showcases company history, including its start as a textile mill.

The Nagoya City Tram & Subway Museum has trams and subway cars, as well as the Nagoya City Science Museum. The SCMaglev and Railway Park opened in March 2011 with various trains from the Central Japan Railway Company.

Other art museums in Aichi prefecture are the Aichi Prefectural Ceramic Museum and the Toyota Municipal Museum of Art. Meiji Mura is an open-air museum with salvaged buildings from the Meiji, Taishō and Showa eras. Another museum in Nagoya is the Mandolin Melodies Museum.

Other museums in the city include the International Design Centre Nagoya, the Japan Spinning Top Museum and the Bank of Tokyo-Mitsubishi UFJ Money Museum.

The civic authorities promote tourism and have taken steps to safeguard architectural heritage by earmarking them as cultural assets. Apart from the castle, temples, shrines and museums in the city, a "Cultural Path" was instituted in the 1980s, located between the Tokugawa Art Museum and Nagoya Castle. This residential area has historic buildings such as the Nagoya City Archives, the Nagoya City Hall main building, the Aichi Prefectural Office main building, the Futaba Museum, the former residence of Sasuke Toyoda, the former residence of Tetsujiro Haruta and the Chikaramachi Catholic Church. Most buildings date from the Meiji and Taishō era and are protected.

=== Theatres ===
Nō and Kyōgen theatre date back to the feudal times of the Owari Tokugawa lords. The Nagoya Noh Theater at Nagoya Castle continues that tradition and is a prominent feature in the cultural life of the city, with monthly performances.

Developed during the Edo period, one of Japan's kabuki grand stages is Misono-za, which also hosts various other Japanese entertainment such as concerts.

In 1912, the musician Gorō Morita invented the Nagoya harp music instrument.

In 1992, the large, modern Aichi Arts Center was opened in Sakae. It is the main venue for performing arts, featuring a main hall that can be used for opera and theatre and a concert hall. The Nagoya Philharmonic Orchestra performs there, as well as many visiting guest orchestras.

=== Ikebana ===
Ishida-ryū (石田流) is a school of Ikebana, or Japanese floral art. It was founded in 1922 and is headquartered in Nagoya.

=== Festivals ===
Apart from the main national festivals and holidays, other festivals in Nagoya are unique to the city/region.

Major events include the June Atsuta Festival, the July Port Festival, the August Nagoya Castle Summer Festival and the October Nagoya Festival. Wards and areas host local festivals such as the Daidō-chōnin Matsuri (大須大道町人祭, Street Performer's Festival) in Ōsu.

=== Dialect ===
The Nagoya dialect (名古屋弁, Nagoya-ben) is spoken in the western half of Aichi Prefecture, centering on Nagoya. It is also called Owari dialect (尾張弁, Owari-ben). The Nagoya dialect is relatively close to standard Japanese and to the Kansai dialect, differing in pronunciation and vocabulary.

=== Handicrafts ===
The industry of Japanese handicrafts in the city is centuries old.

- Arimatsu and Narumi dye: during the construction of Nagoya Castle in the 17th century, the lords of Owari called in skilled craftsmen from Bungo Province in Kyushu, known for their tie-dyed fabrics. These craftsmen and their families were treated generously by the Owari and settled in the Arimatsu und Narumi neighbourhoods. Only the base fabric is dyed, leaving parts that were knotted as white spots. This highly specialised process requires 6–12 months to complete.
- Geta clog straps: wooden clogs called geta were the shoes of the feudal era. The Owari devised a unique pattern for the cotton straps of the clogs and ordered them to be made by local weavers. The technique has developed over the generations. The straps became stronger and more resilient but more comfortable for the feet with the discovery of cotton velvet.
- Shippo: the technique for enamelware called shippo arrived from the Netherlands towards the end of the Edo period. The patterns appear almost transparent and are often used on pottery.
- Candles: wax is taken from a wax tree and painted around a rope made of grass and Japanese paper (washi) over and over again into layers. When cut in half, the candle looks as if it grew like a tree with rings. Japanese candles produce less smoke and are harder to blow out, since the wick tends to be larger. Artists paint the candles in coloured patterns.
- Yuzen: the art of silk dyeing was introduced by craftsmen from Kyoto during the rule of Owari Togukawa. The initial designs were extravagant and brightly coloured, but over time became more muted and light-coloured.
- Sekku Ningyo: festival dolls were introduced by markets during the Meiji era. Nagoya craftsmen rank among the top producers.
- The city also gave its name to a type of obi, the sash that is used to tie a kimono. The term Nagoya obi can refer to an older type of obi used centuries ago. This type was cord-like. The current Nagoya obi (名古屋帯?) – or to differentiate from the fukuro Nagoya obi, also called kyūsun Nagoya obi (九寸名古屋帯?; "nine-inch nagoya obi") – is the most-used obi type today. It was developed by a seamstress living in Nagoya at the end of the 1920s. The new, easy-to-use obi gained popularity among Tokyo's geisha, from whom it then was adopted by fashionable city women for their everyday wear. The Nagoya obi was originally for everyday wear, not for ceremonial outfits, but one made from exquisite brocade can be accepted as semi-ceremonial wear. A more formal version is called the Fukuro Nagoya obi (袋名古屋帯?) or hassun Nagoya obi (八寸名古屋帯?; "eight-inch Nagoya obi"), which is more formal.
- Japanese pottery and porcelain has a long tradition due to suitable clay being available in Owari Province. Seto ware and Tokoname ware are from the region. In the town itself Ofukei ware, Toyoraku ware, Sasashima ware and Kawana ware were produced.
- Netsuke artists such as Tametaka and Ikkan were well known during the Edo period.

=== Cuisine ===
The city and the region are known for their unique local Nagoya cuisine (名古屋めし, Nagoya meshi). Dishes include:

- Tebasaki: chicken wings marinated in a sweet sauce with sesame seeds, basically a type of yakitori
- Tenmusu: a rice ball wrapped with nori that is filled with deep-fried tempura shrimp
- Kishimen: flat udon noodles with a slippery texture, dipped in a light soy sauce soup and a sliced leek or other flavouring added. It can be eaten cold or hot.
- Red miso: various dishes that use red miso, such as miso katsu (pork cutlet) with sweet miso sauce and miso nikomi udon (hard udon stewed in miso soup)
- Hitsumabushi: rice dish with unagi in a lidded wooden container. This dish is enjoyed three ways; as unadon, with spice and as chazuke.
- Miso nikomi udon: Firmer texture udon noodles. It is served in a Donabe pot and it usually arrives still bubbling and steaming hot at the table.
Cuisine
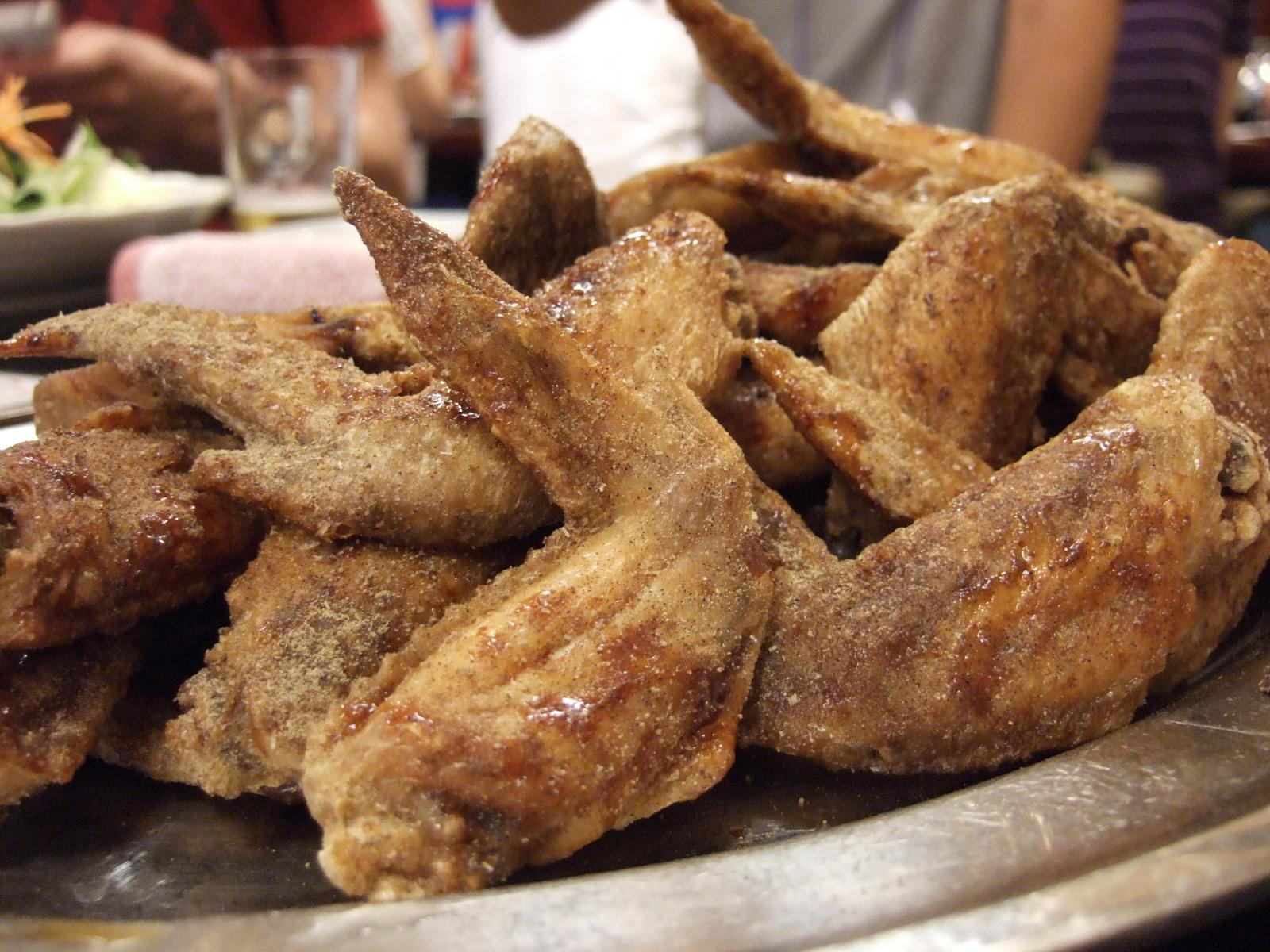
Tebasaki

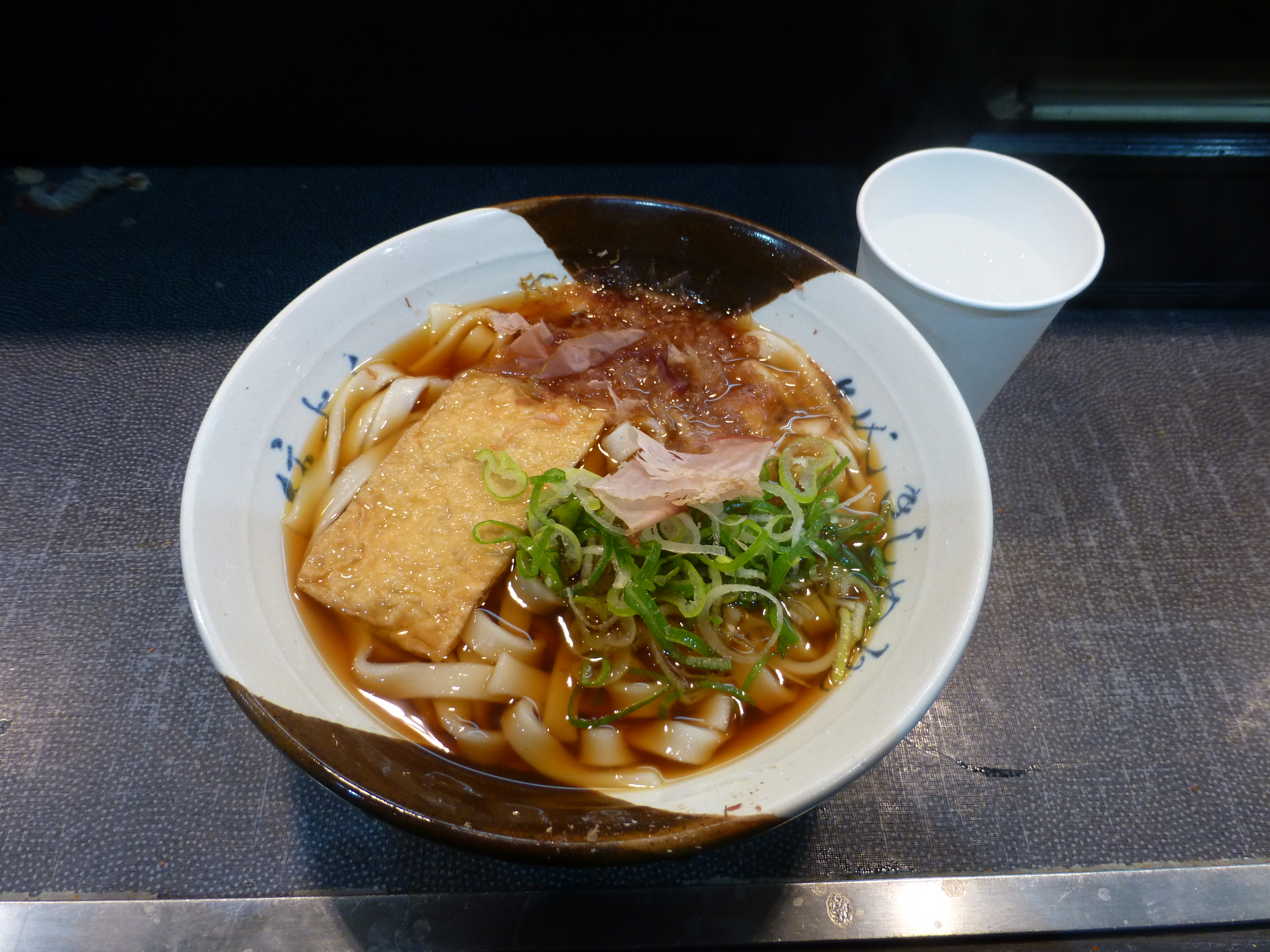
Kishimen, a local specialty

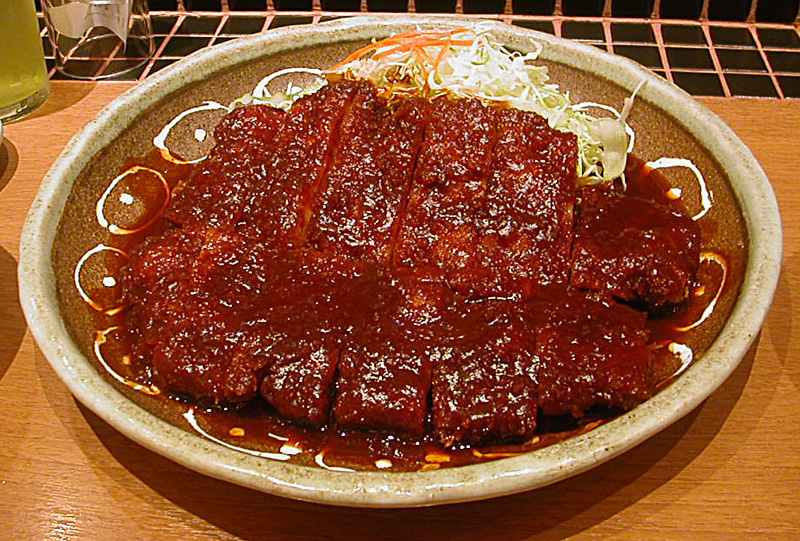
Red misokatsu

=== In popular culture ===
The world premiere of the first Godzilla movie was in Nagoya on 27 October 1954. The city, especially Nagoya Castle, has been featured in two other Godzilla movies: Mothra vs. Godzilla and Godzilla vs. Mothra. The city is also featured in Gamera vs. Gyaos and is the main setting of 2003 film Gozu. The 1995 film The Hunted starring Christopher Lambert and the 1992 film Mr. Baseball starring Tom Selleck were also filmed in the city.

The city was the setting for the 2007 movie Ashita e no yuigon (translated as Best Wishes for Tomorrow), in which a Japanese war criminal sets out to take responsibility for the execution of U.S. airmen. The anime The Wind Rises by Hayao Miyazaki, released in 2013, is a highly fictionalized biography of the Mitsubishi A6M Zero's chief engineer Jiro Horikoshi and takes mostly place in Nagoya of the 1920s and 1930s. Nagoya is also the setting for the manga and anime series Yatogame-chan Kansatsu Nikki, which highlights many of the sites and traditions of the city.

Haruki Murakami called Nagoya "another world" (異界, ikai) in the book "Tokyo Surume Club: Chikyuu no Hagurekata".

=== Sports ===
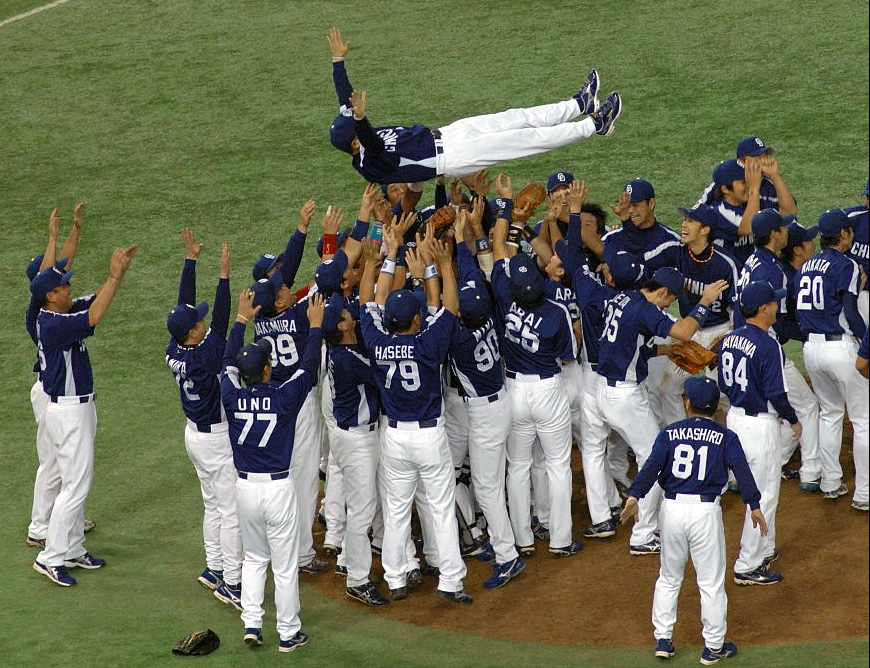
The Chunichi Dragons are one of Japan's strongest baseball teams.

Nagoya is home to several professional sports teams:

Club	Sport	League	Venue	Established
Chunichi Dragons	Baseball	NPB (Ce.League)	Nagoya Dome, Nagoya Stadium	1936
Toyota Verblitz	Rugby	League ONE	Paloma Mizuho Rugby Stadium, Toyota Stadium	1941
Nagoya Diamond Dolphins	Basketball	B.League	Aichi Prefectural Gymnasium, Nagoya Higashi sport center	1950
Toyotsu Fighting Eagles Nagoya	Basketball	B.League	Biwajima Sports Center	1957
Wolf Dogs Nagoya	Volleyball	V.LEAGUE	TOYODA GOSEI Memorial Gymnasium (ENTRIO)	1961
Daido Steel Phenix	Handball	JHL	Daido Steel Hoshizaki Gym	1964
Daido Steel Red Star	Volleyball	V.LEAGUE	Daido Steel Hoshizaki Gym	1968
Nagoya Cyclones	American football	X-League	Nagoya Minato Stadium	1980
Nagoya Frater	Field hockey	Hockey Japan League	Shōnai Greens Park	1985
Nagoya Grampus	Football	J.League	Paloma Mizuho Stadium, Toyota Stadium	1993
Nagoya Oceans	Futsal	F.League	Takeda Teva Ocean Arena	2006

In 2007, the Chunichi Dragons won the Japan Series baseball championship. In 2010, Nagoya Grampus won the J. League championship, their first in team history. Nagoya is also the home of the Nagoya Barbarians semi-pro rugby football club.

A honbasho sumo tournament is held every July at the Aichi Prefectural Gymnasium. The city has hosted The Crowns golf tournament since 1960 and the women's Nagoya Marathon since 1984.

The city had a bid to host the 1988 Summer Olympics but lost to Seoul.

The city hosted the official 1979 Asian Basketball Championship. Later, it became one of the host cities of the official Women's Volleyball World Championship for its 1998, 2006 and 2010 editions.

In September 2016 the city was awarded the right to host the 2026 Asian Games after it was the only city to lodge a bid. It is the third time Japan hosts the event after Tokyo in 1958 and Hiroshima in 1994. The 2026 Asian Games are being hosted by Nagoya in September and October 2026. Nagoya also hosted some events of the 2020 Tokyo Olympics and 2020 Paralympic Games.

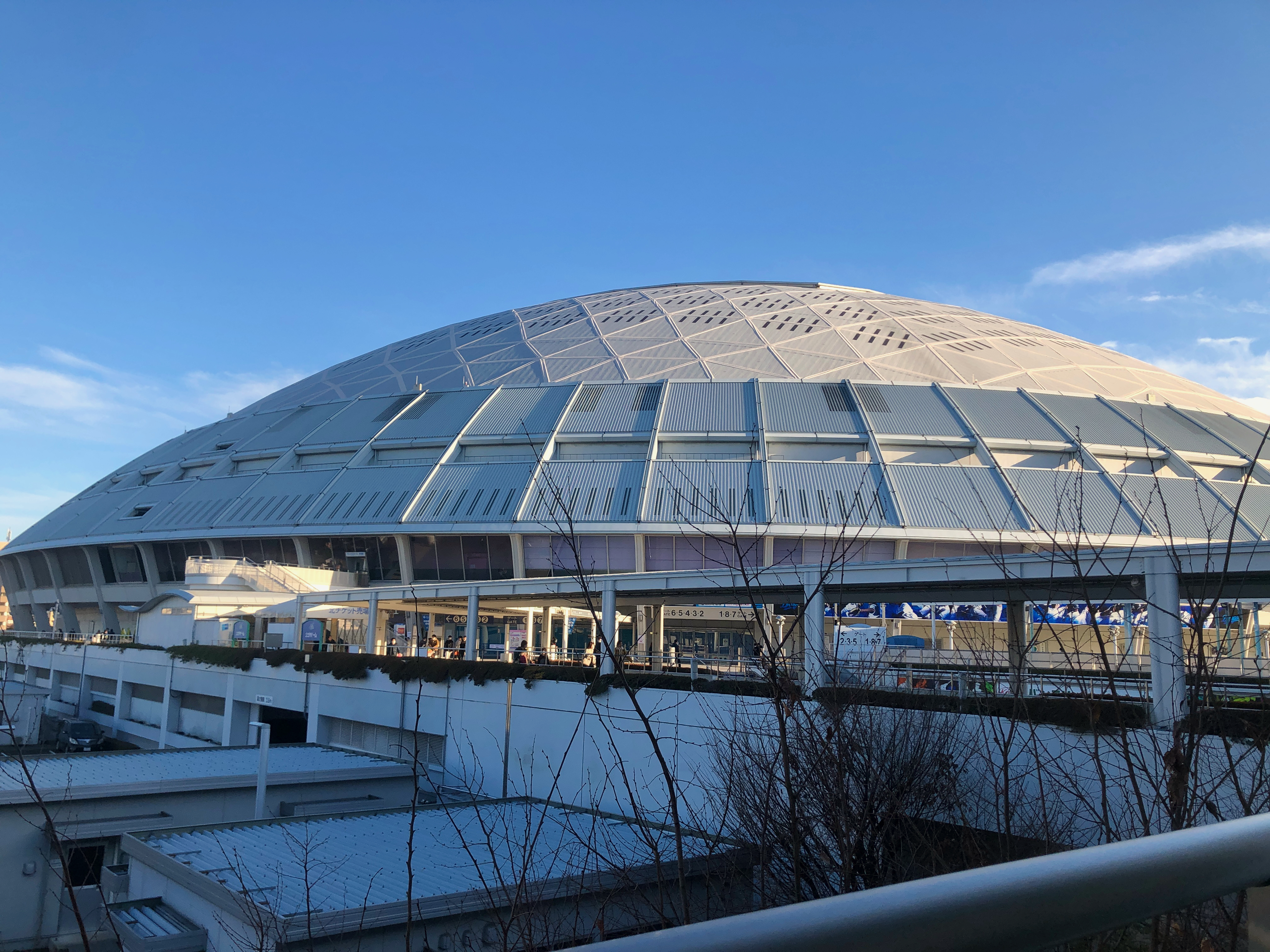
Nagoya Dome

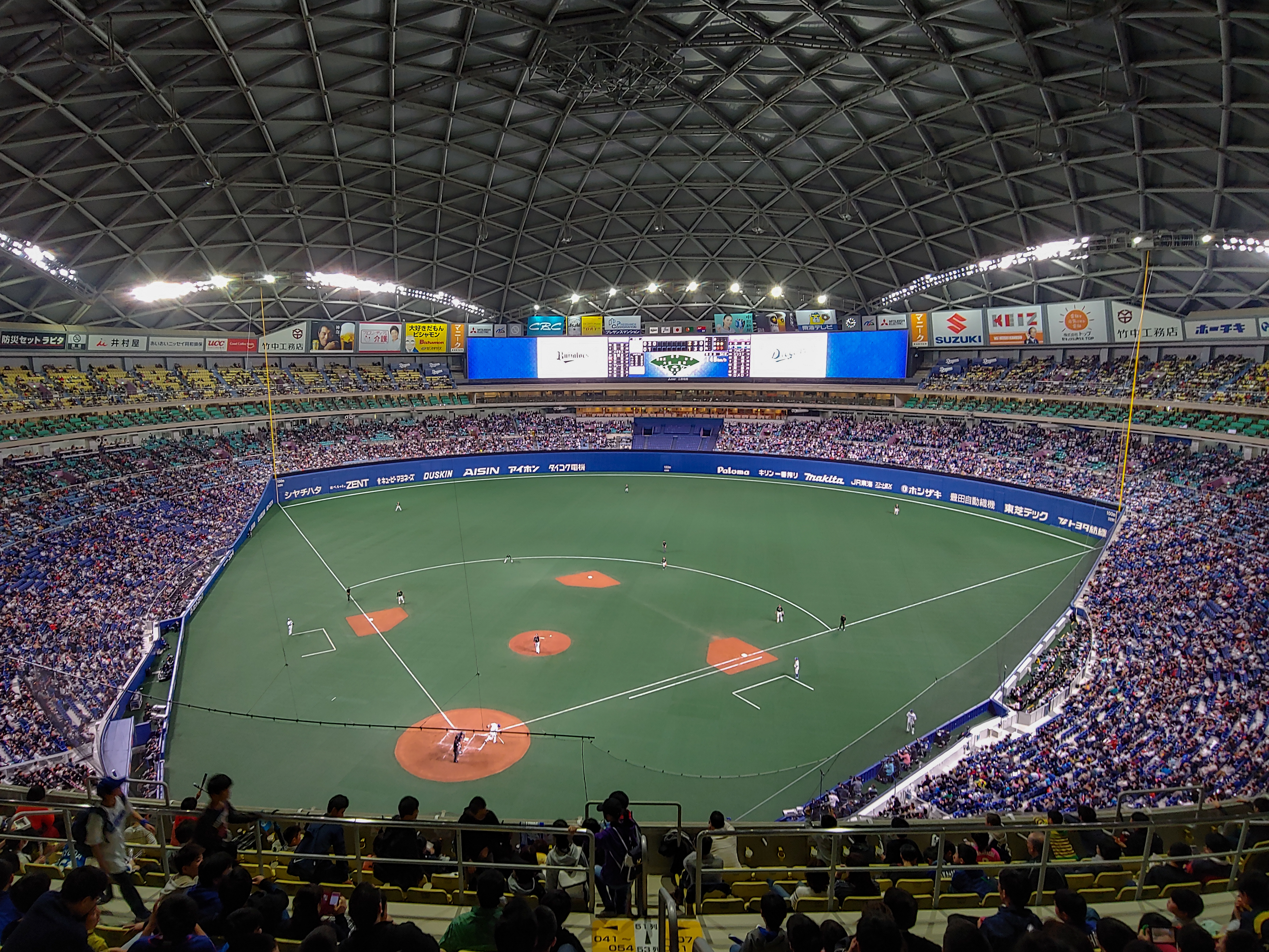
Chunichi Dragons

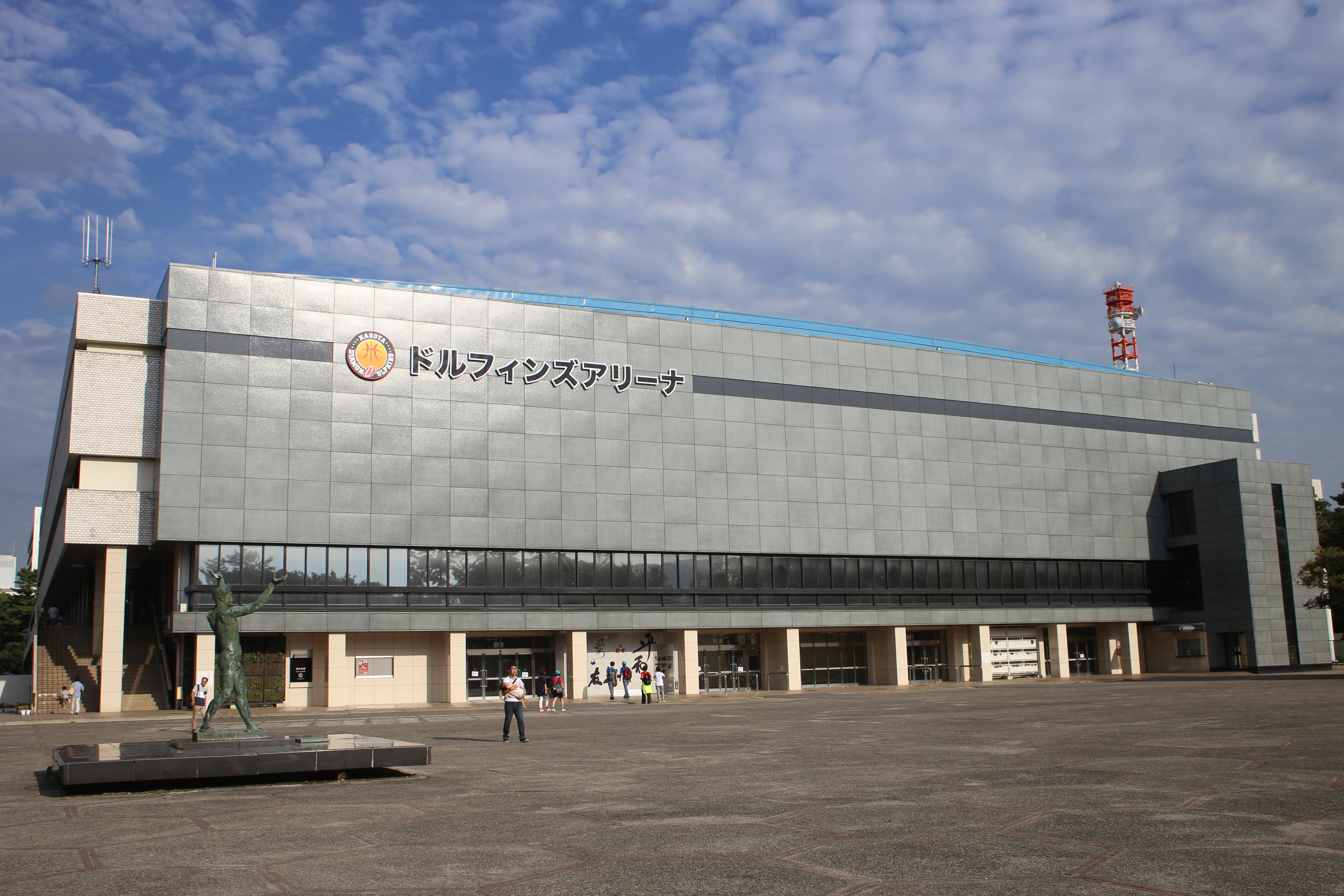
The Aichi Prefectural Gymnasium is used for Sumo wrestling and other events

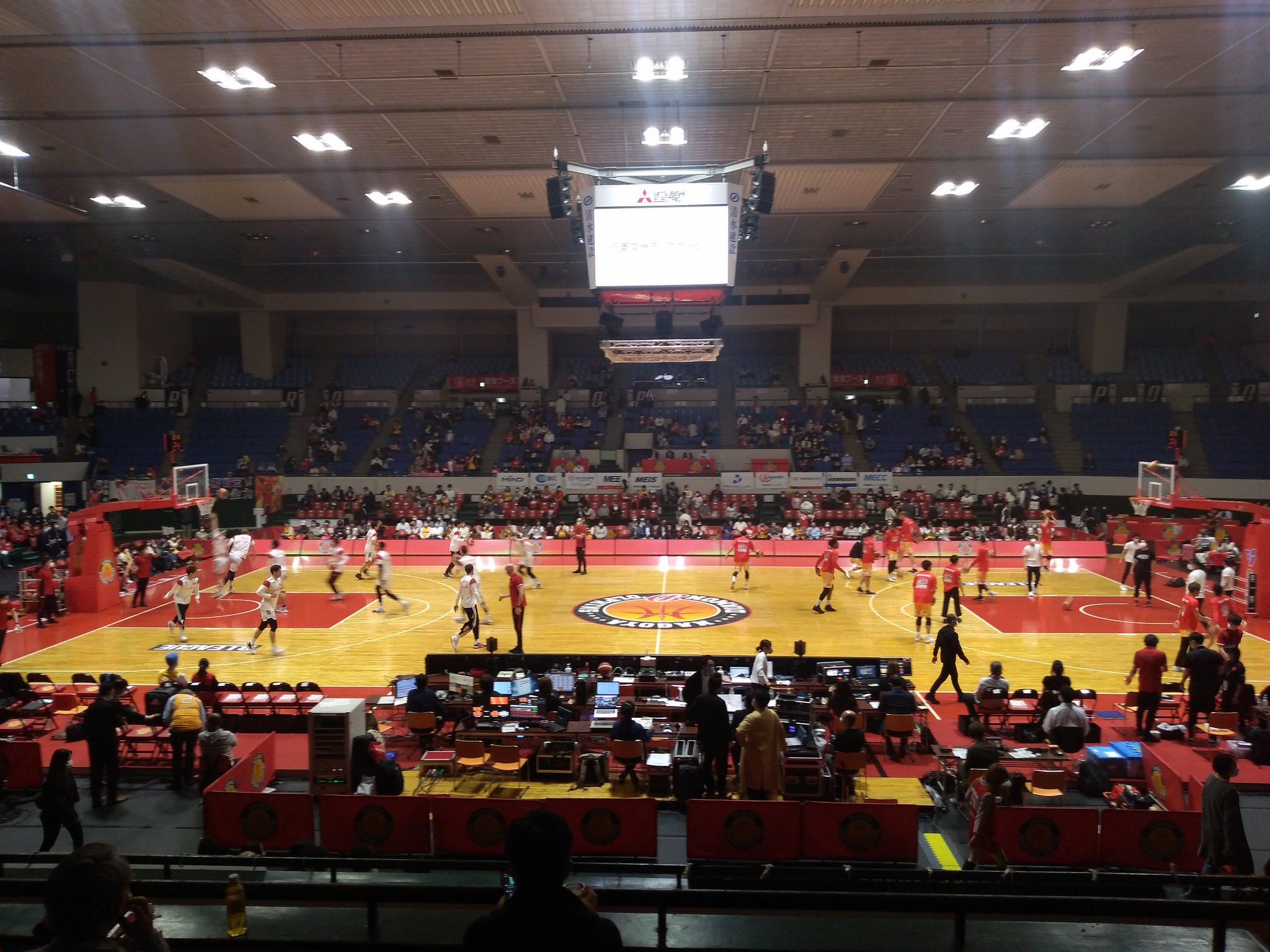
Nagoya Diamond Dolphins

Paloma Mizuho Stadium

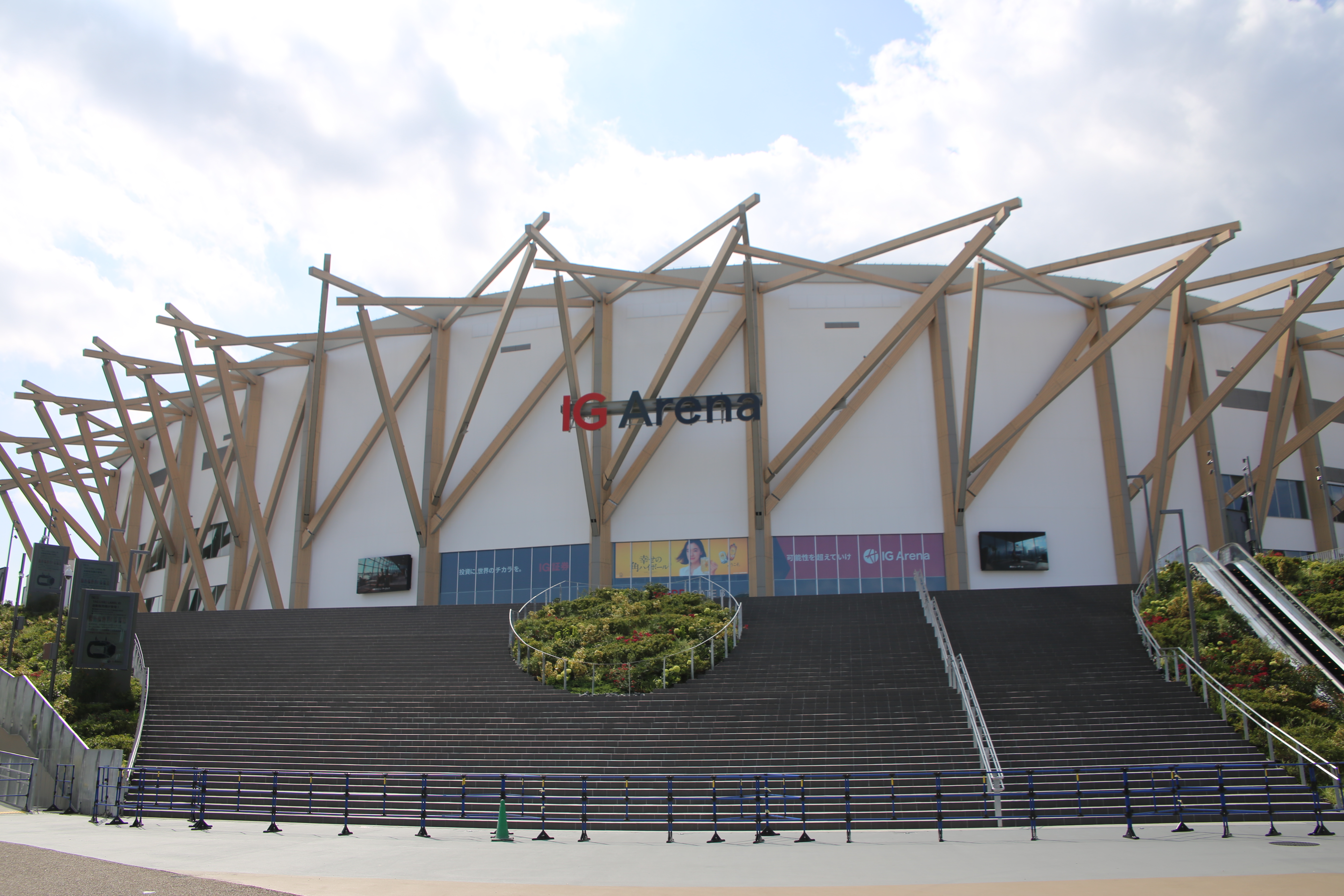
Aichi International Arena

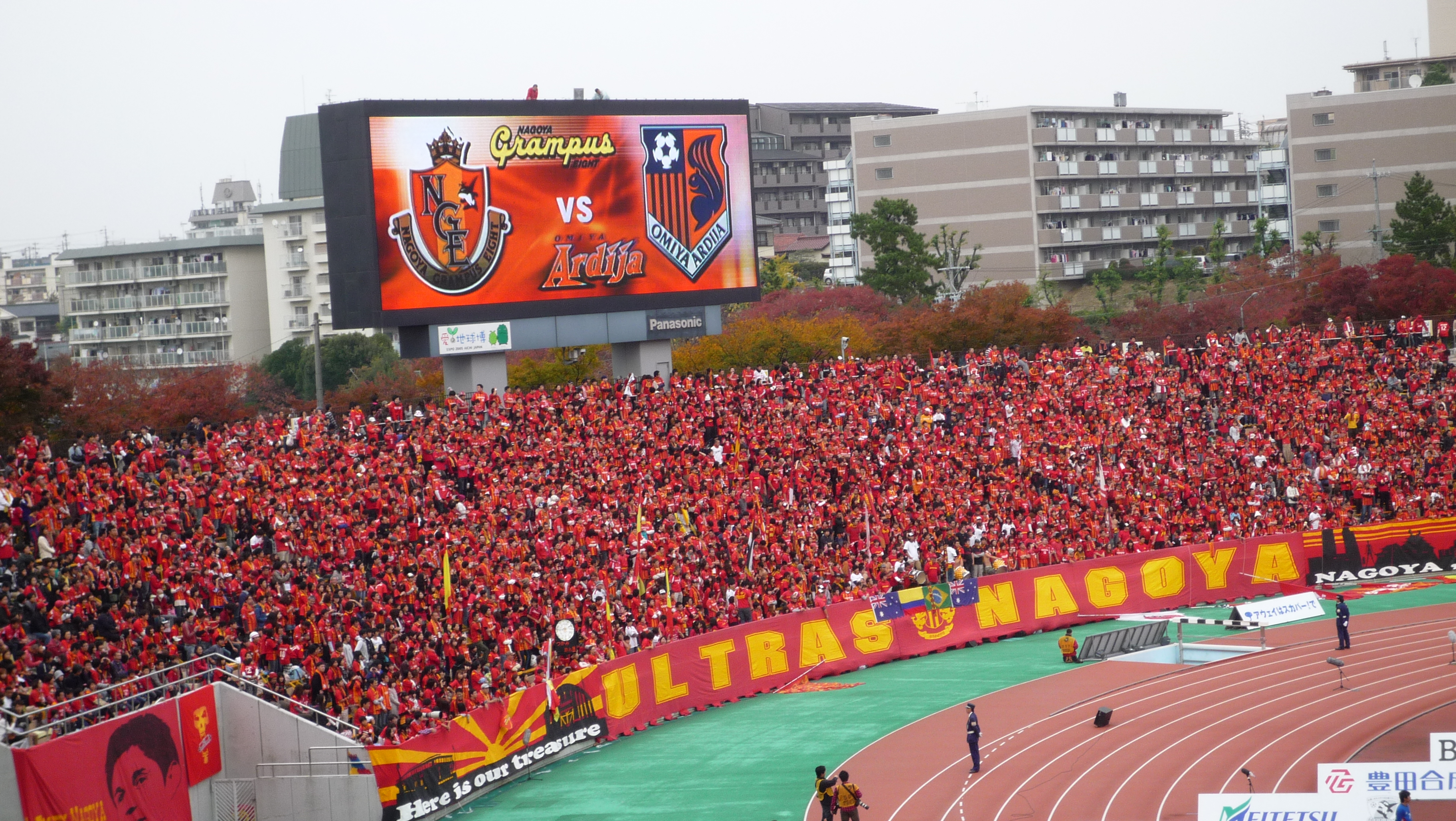
Nagoya Grampus at the former Paloma Mizuho Stadium

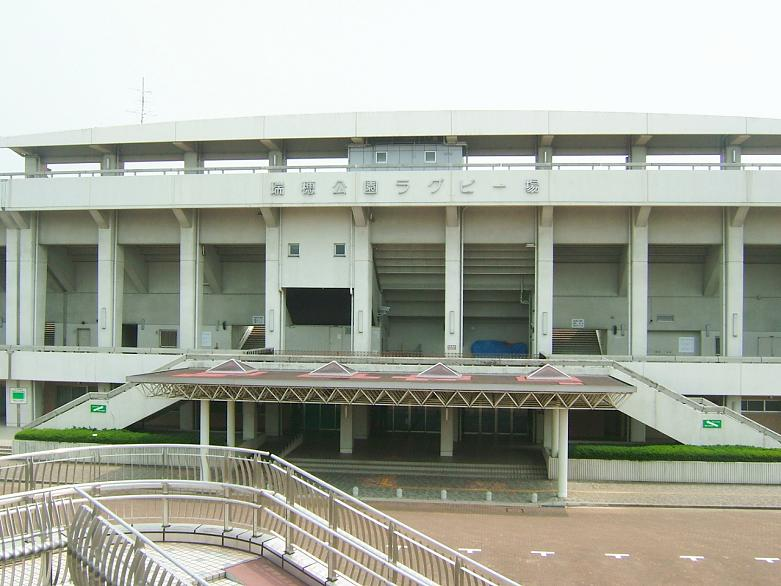
Paloma Mizuho Rugby Stadium

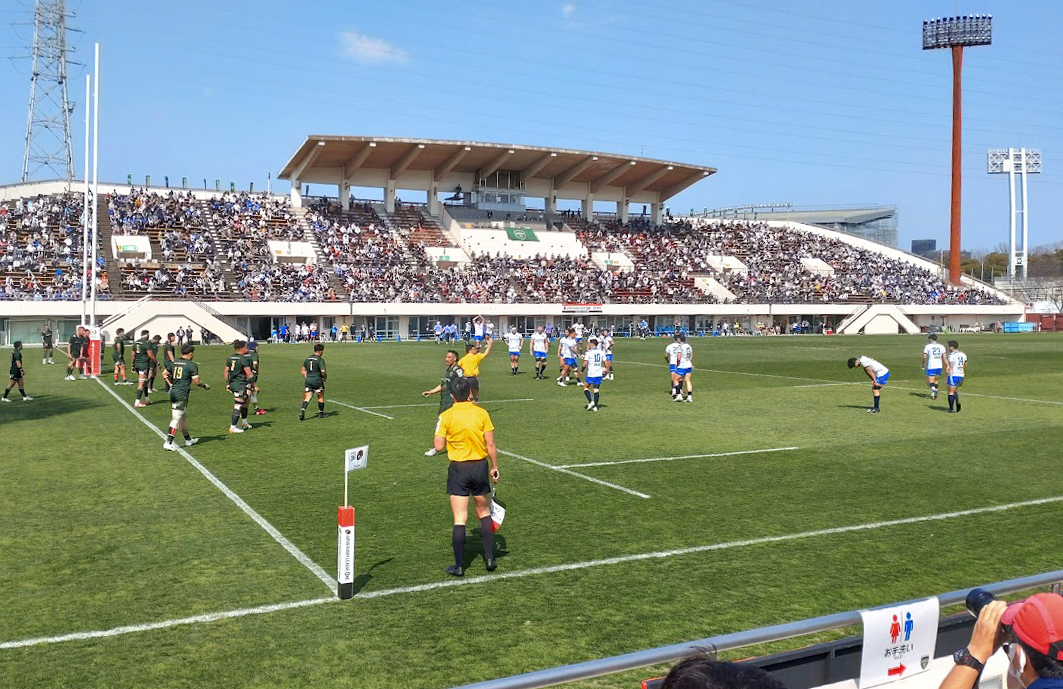
Toyota Verblitz

== Notable people ==
=== Historical figures ===
Minamoto no Yoritomo, born in Nagoya

Minamoto no Yoritomo was the first shōgun of the Kamakura shogunate. His family had roots as the high priests of Atsuta Shrine and he was born in the family villa that is Seigan-ji today.

The three samurais who unified Japan in the 16th century all have strong links to Nagoya:

- Oda Nobunaga (1534–1582), from Nagoya Castle in Owari Province
- Toyotomi Hideyoshi (1536–1598), one of Oda Nobunaga's top generals
- Tokugawa Ieyasu (1543–1616), born in Mikawa Province, (the eastern half of modern Aichi prefecture)
The three samurais who unified Japan in the 16th century
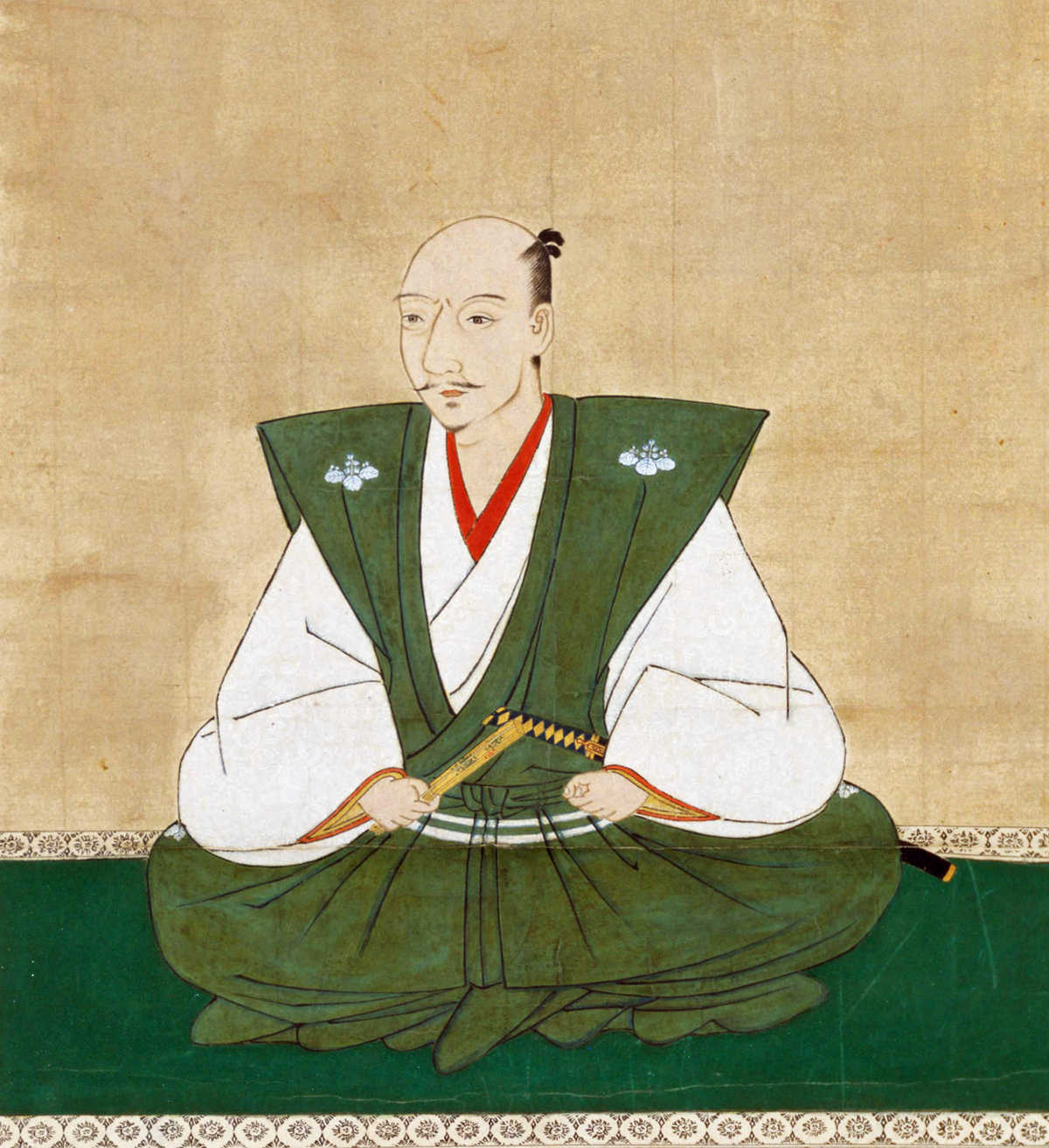
According to legend, Oda Nobunaga was born in Nagoya Castle

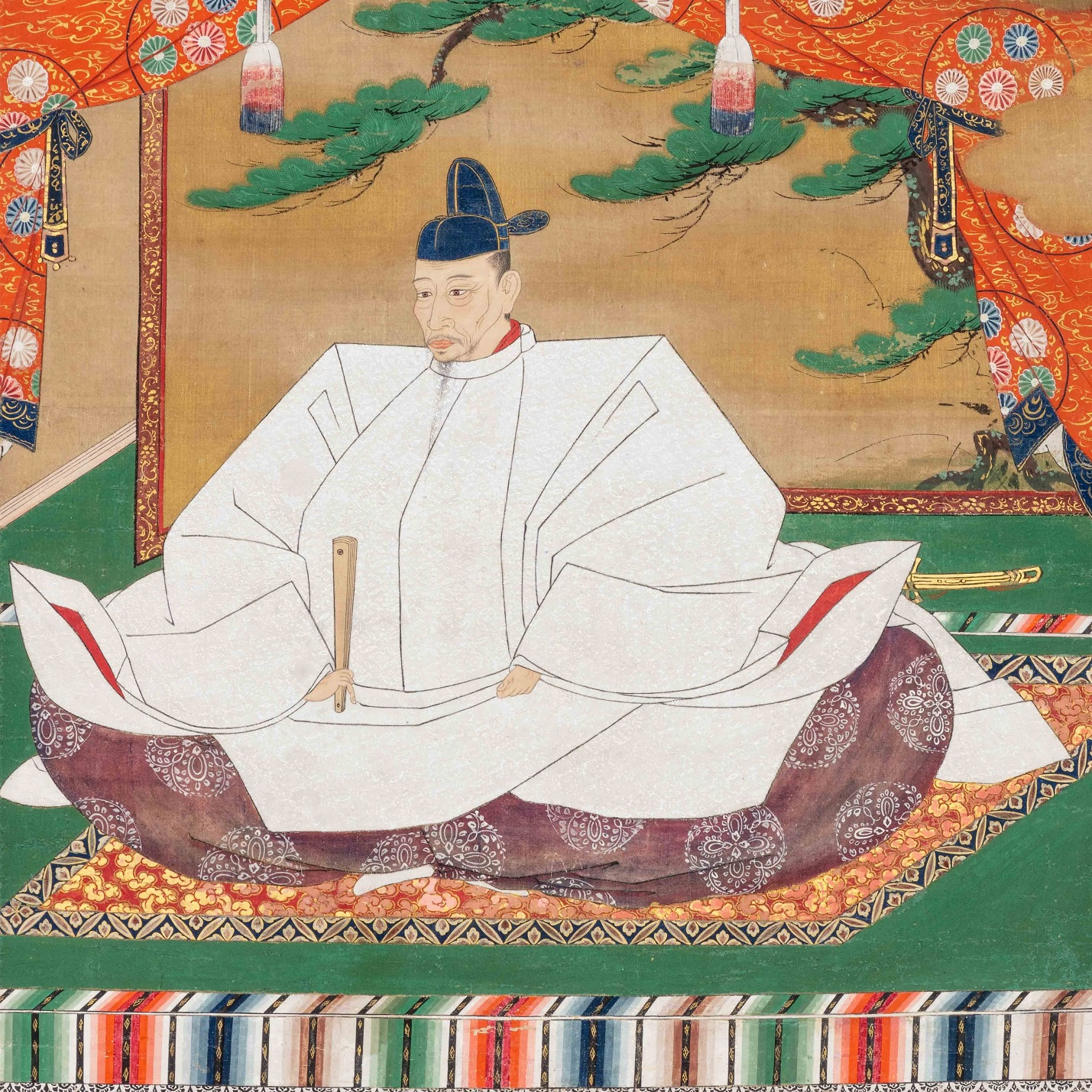
Toyotomi Hideyoshi, known as Japan's second "great unifier"

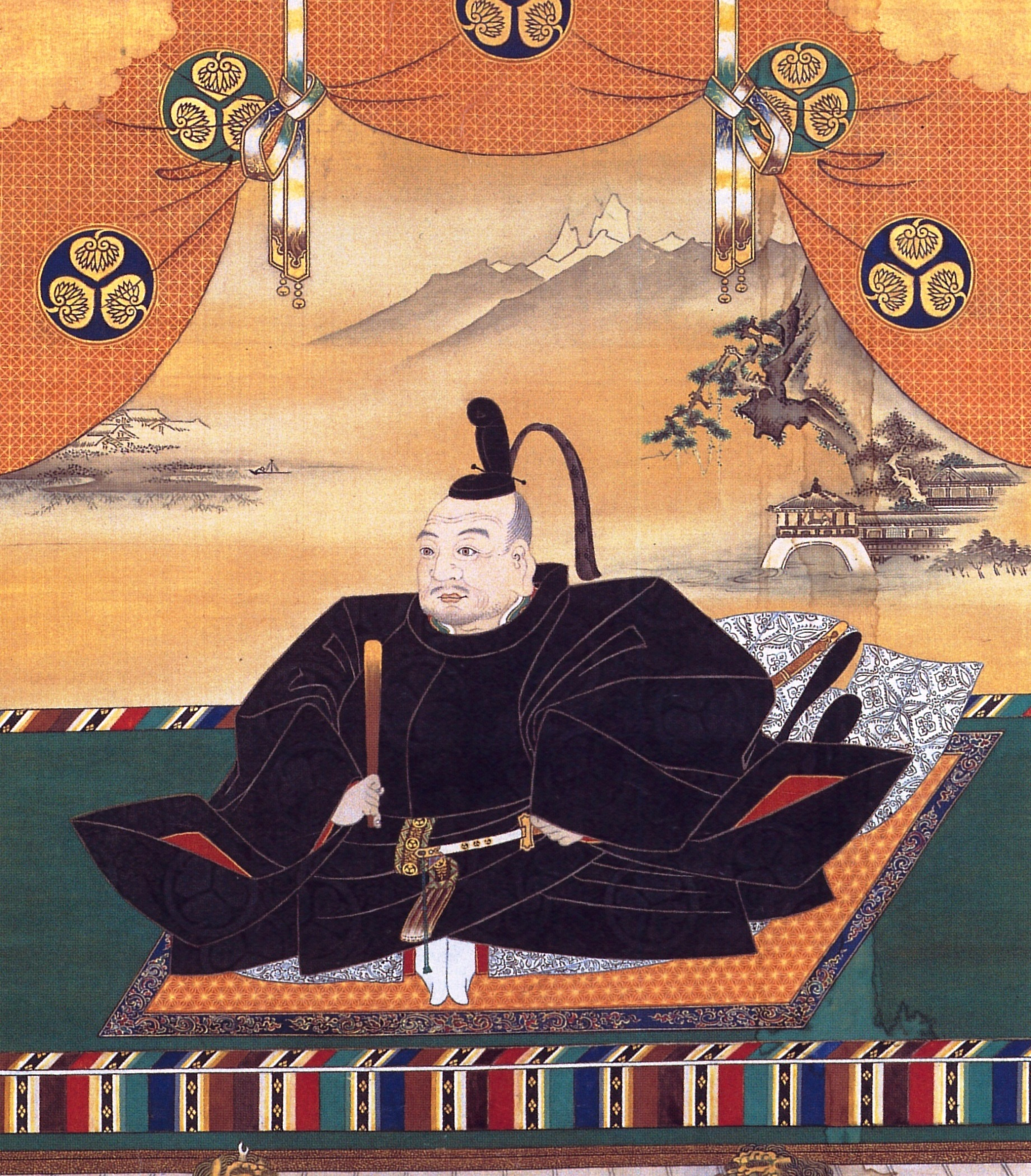
Tokugawa Ieyasu

Other samurai include:

- Shibata Katsuie (samurai of the Sengoku period)
- Niwa Nagahide (samurai of the Sengoku period)
- Maeda Toshiie (samurai of the Sengoku period)
- Katō Kiyomasa (samurai of the Sengoku period)
- Sassa Narimasa (samurai of the Sengoku period)
- Sakuma Nobumori (samurai of the Sengoku period)
- Sakuma Morimasa (samurai of the Sengoku period)
- Maeda Toshimasu (Maeda Keijirō, samurai of the Sengoku period)

=== Inventors and industrialists ===
- Sakichi Toyoda (1867–1930), prolific inventor from Shizuoka Prefecture
- Kiichiro Toyoda (1894–1952), son of Sakichi Toyoda, established Toyota Motor Corporation
- Akio Morita (1921–1999), co-founder of Sony
- Jiro Horikoshi (1903–1982), worked in Nagoya as chief engineer of the Mitsubishi A6M Zero fighter
- Akio Toyoda (born 1956), current Chairman and Former president & CEO of Toyota Motor Corporation

=== Executive officers ===
- Yoichi Wada

=== Writers ===
- Yokoi Yayū (1702–1783), haiku poet and samurai in Owari Domain
- Kansuke Yamamoto (artist) (1914–1987), photographer and poet
- Ryukichi Terao (born 1971), Hispanist and translator of Latin American literature

=== Scientists ===
- Leonor Michaelis (1875–1949) German and American biochemist known for development of enzyme kinetics worked in Nagoya from 1922 to 1926
- Susumu Tonegawa (1939–2026) Nobel prizewinner who discovered the genetic mechanism that produces antibody diversity
- Tsuneko Okazaki (born 1933) pioneer of molecular biology known for her work on DNA replication

=== Performing artists ===
==== Musicians and composers ====
- Etsuko Hirose (born 1979), classical pianist
- Moa Kikuchi (born 1999), dancer and singer, best known as a member of kawaii metal trio Babymetal under the name "Moametal"
- Home Made Kazoku, hip hop trio
- Yōsei Teikoku, band
- Spyair, rock band
- Kiyoharu (born 1968), musician and singer-songwriter, known for his work with Kuroyume and Sads
- Koji Kondo (born 1961), music composer, pianist, and music director for Nintendo
- Seamo (born 1975), rapper
- Takanori Iwata (born 1989), dancer and actor (member of J-pop boygroups Sandaime J Soul Brothers and Exile)
- Naomi Tamura (born 1963), pop singer and songwriter
- Rei (singer) (born 2004), idol singer and member of South Korean girl group IVE
- Kazuki Kato (born 1984), actor, voice actor and singer
- Lullatone, musical duo
- Aya Hirano (born 1987), actor, voice actor and singer
- Jasmine You (1979–2009), musician, best known as original bassist of the symphonic metal band Versailles
- Trooper Salute, indie rock band
- Outrage, thrash metal band
- Enako (born 1994), cosplayer
- Sho Hirano (born 1997), member of King & Prince
- Kanon Suzuki (born 1998), former idol and singer (former member of Japanese girl idol group Morning Musume)
- Shinichi Suzuki (1898–1998), musician, philosopher, and educator and the founder of the international Suzuki method of music education and developed a philosophy for educating people of all ages and abilities
- nobodyknows+, hip hop band
- SKE48, idol group
- Okada Yukiko (1967–1986), idol and winner of the talent show Star Tanjō! in Tokyo
- Coldrain, rock band
- May'n (Real Name: Mei Nakabayashi, Nihongo: 中林 芽依, Nakabayashi Mei, born 1989), Japanese singer
- Team Shachi, female idol group
- Sarah Midori Perry
- Uno Santa
- Syoya Kimata (born 2000), member of JO1
- Keigo Sato (born 1998), member of JO1
- Cocoro Kato, member of Me:I
- Miu Sakurai, member of Me:I
- Masaya Kimura, member of INI (Japanese boy group)
- Masato Hayakawa (born 1986), lead singer of Coldrain, songwriter and model
Musicians and composers
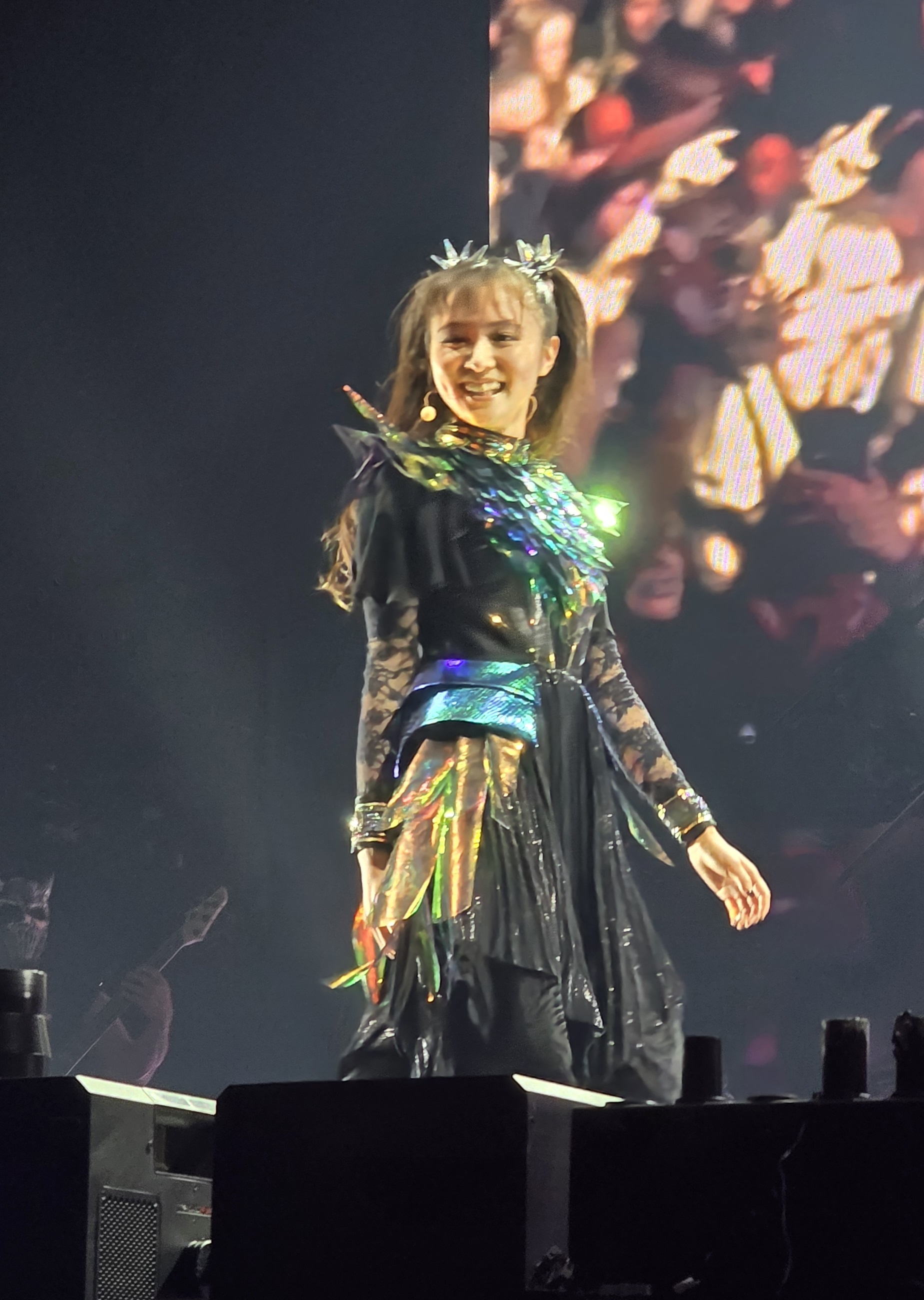
Moa Kikuchi

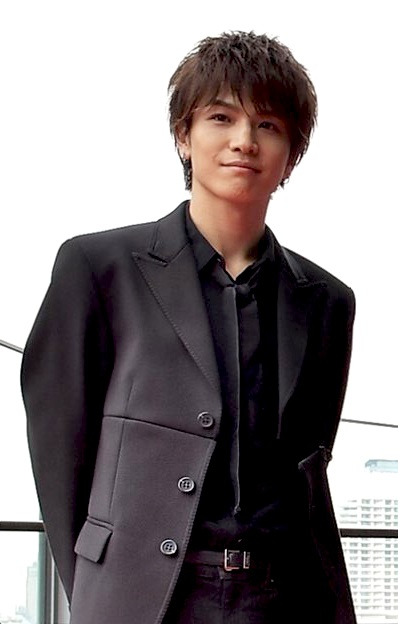
Takanori Iwata

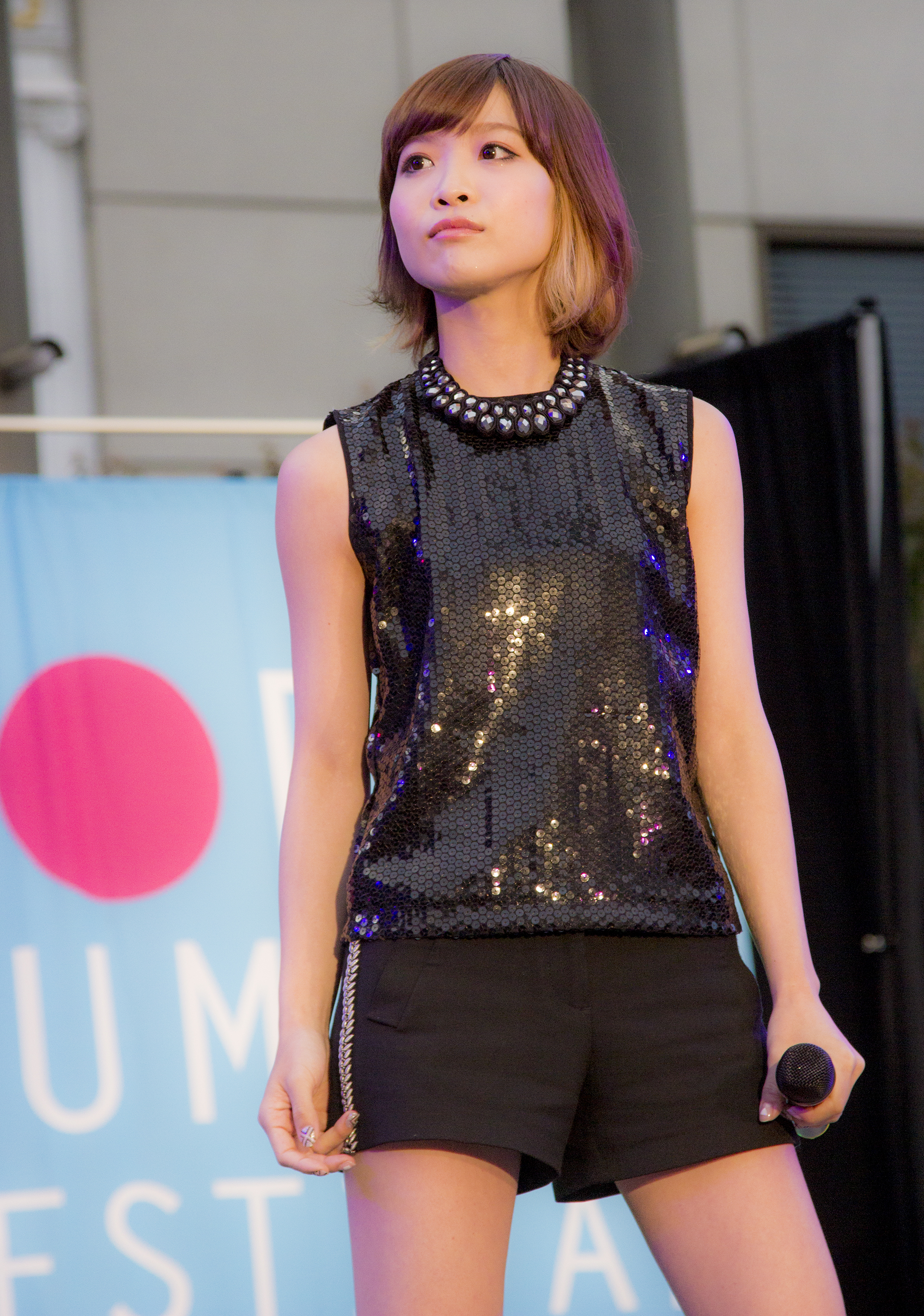
May'n

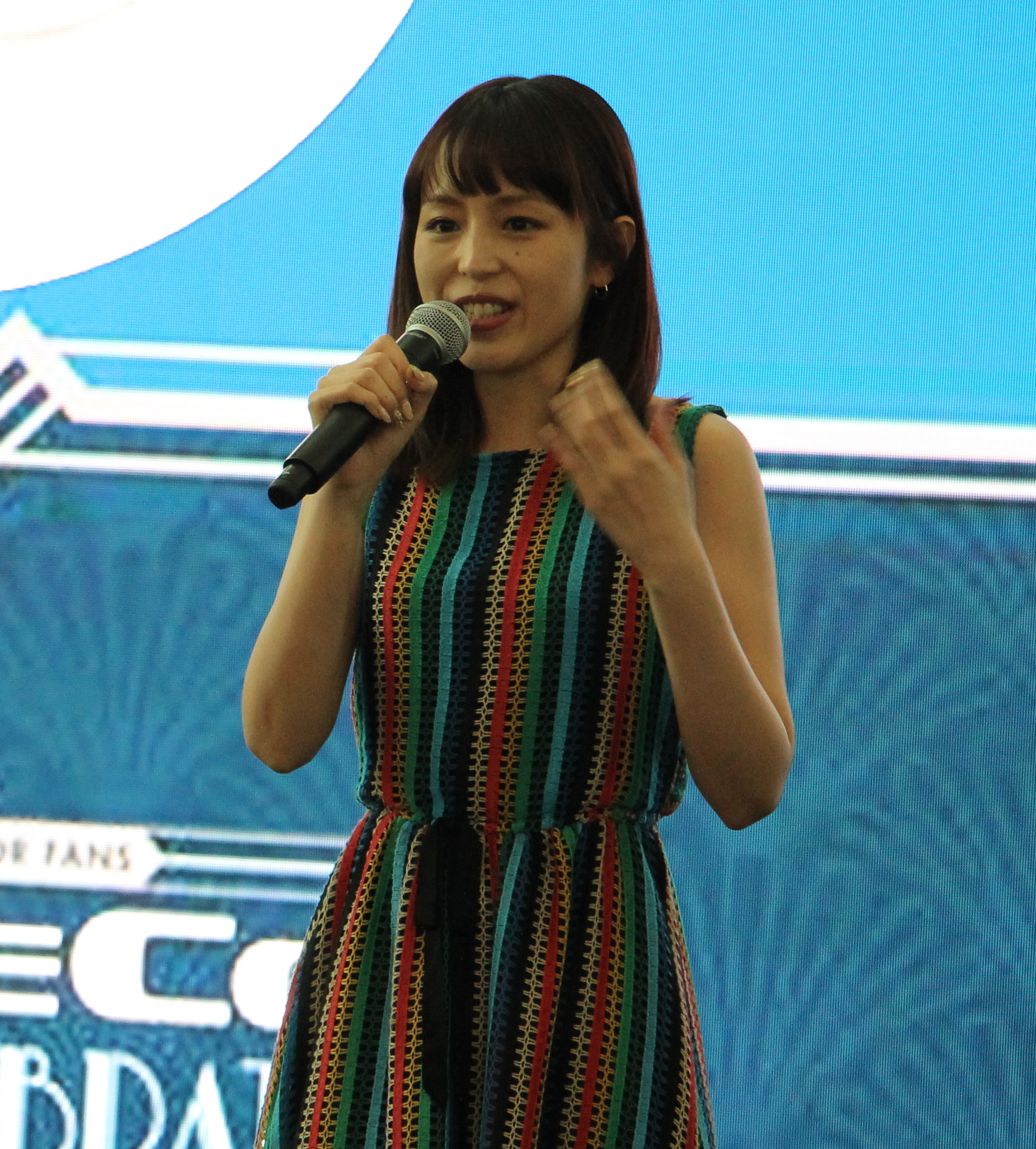
Aya Hirano

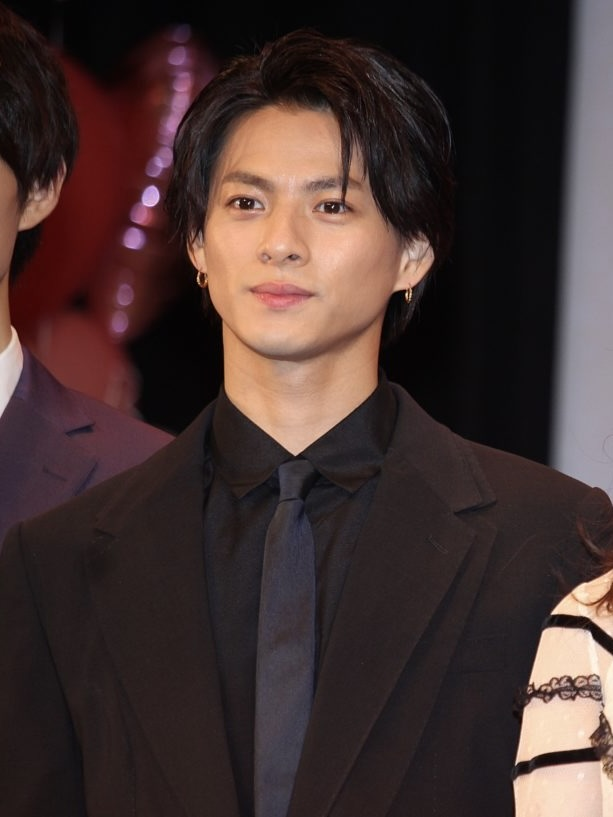
Sho Hirano

==== Actors ====
- Kaede Hondo
- Akari Kitō
- Matt McCooey, British actor of Japanese ancestry
- Naoko Mori
- Kaito Nakamura
- The Nose sisters: Anna, Erena, and Karina
- Naomi Kawashima
- Hirotaka Suzuoki
- Hiroshi Tachi
- Emi Takei
- Hiroshi Tamaki
- Kokoro Terada
- Toshihiko Nakajima
- Yūki Yamada
Actors
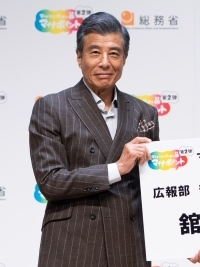
Hiroshi Tachi

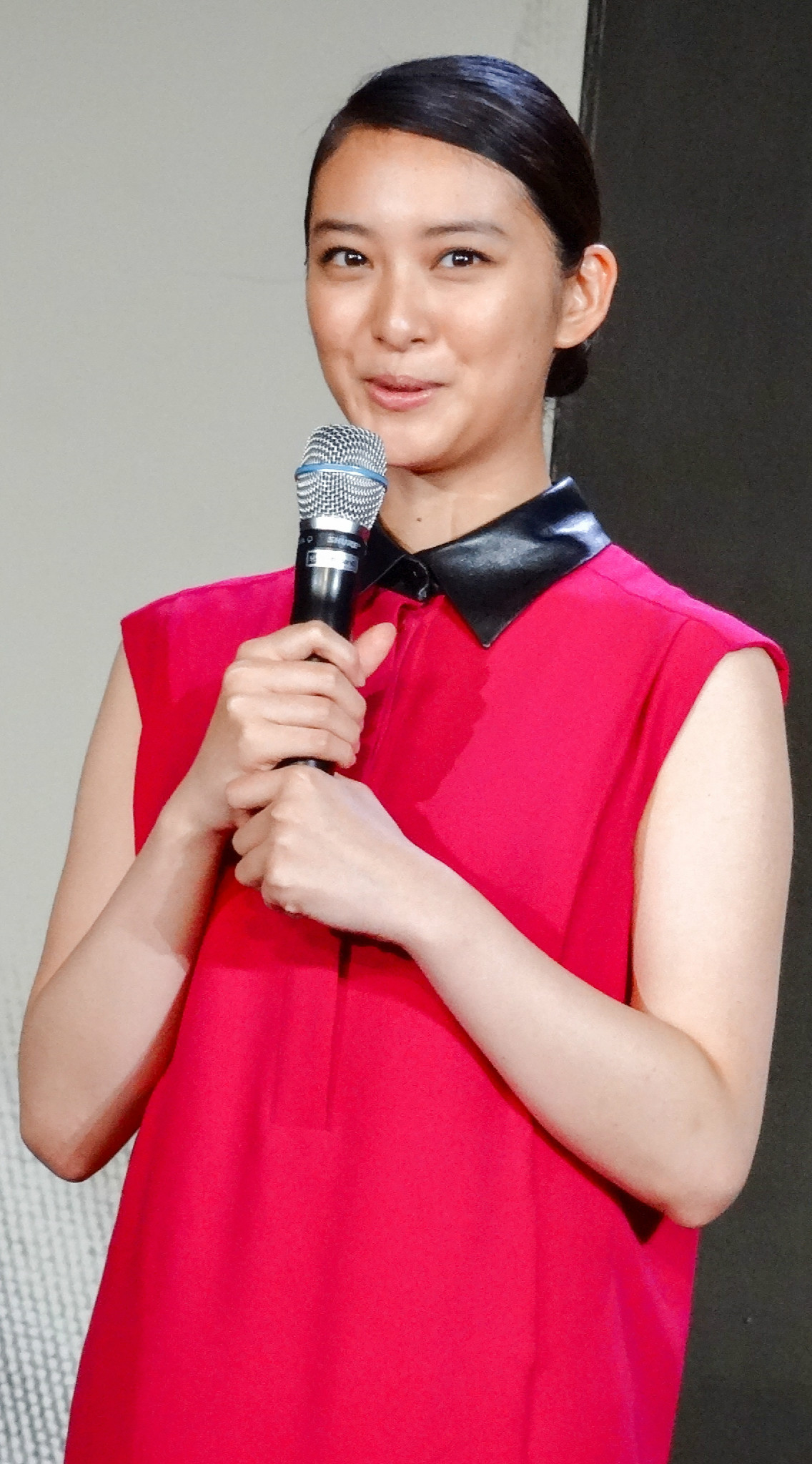
Emi Takei

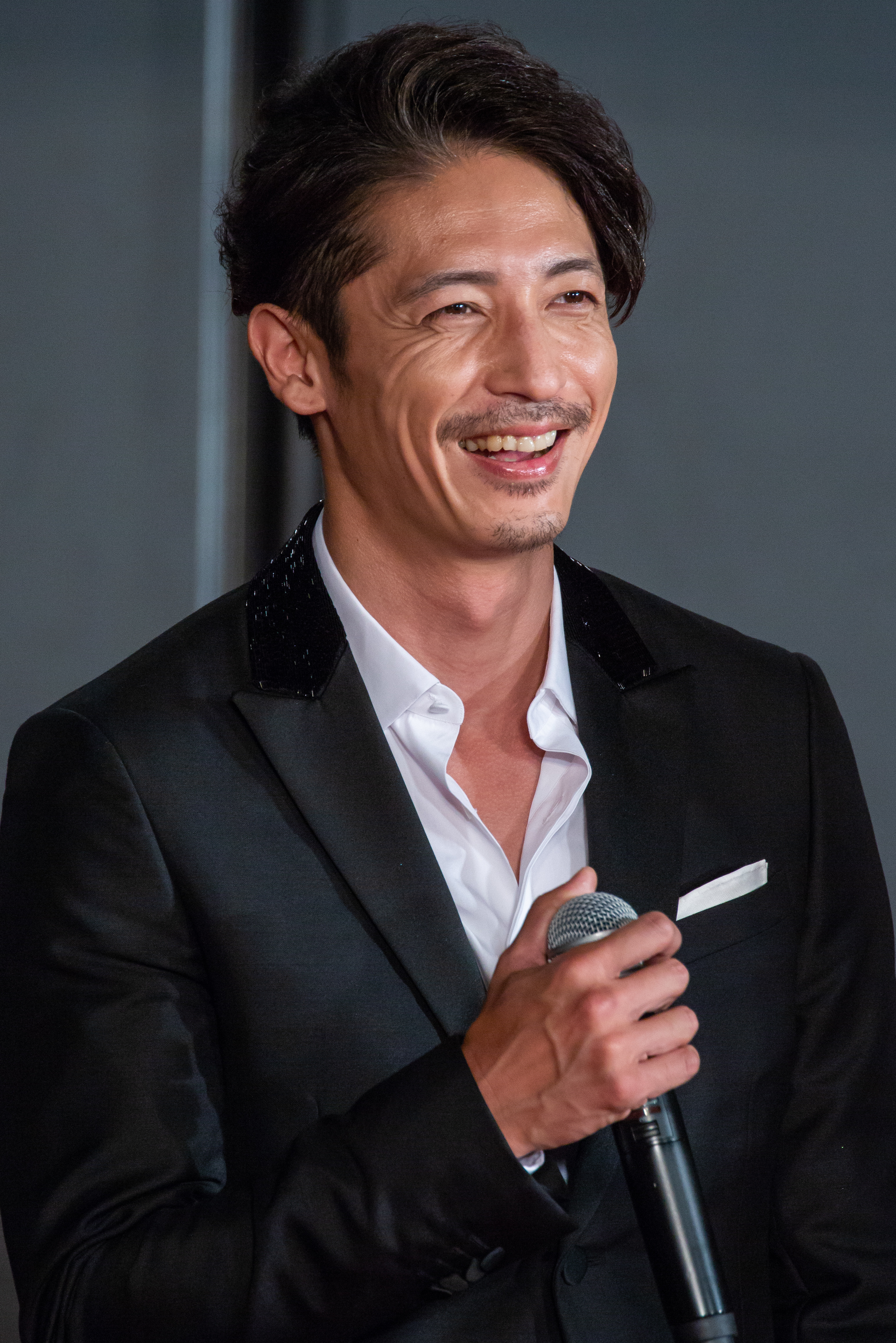
Hiroshi Tamaki

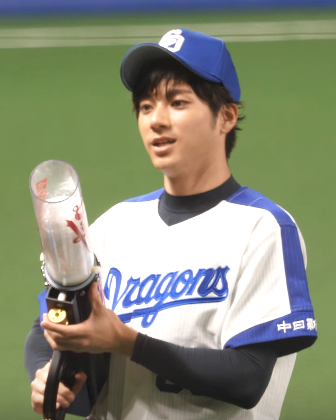
Yūki Yamada

=== Athletes ===
- Miki Ando
- Mao Asada
- Mai Asada
- Hugh Barter
- Kazuki Himeno
- Honoka Hashimoto
- Keisei Tominaga
- Kimiyasu Kudō
- Midori Ito
- Jong Tae-se
- Takamoto Katsuta
- Takuma Koga (footballer)
- Takuma Koga (racing driver)
- Takahiko Kozuka
- Jung Hoo Lee
- Yuto Nomura
- Yōhei Ōshima
- Yoshiaki Oiwa
- Takashi Sugiura
- Último Dragón
- Shoma Uno
- Tomiko Yoshikawa
Athletes
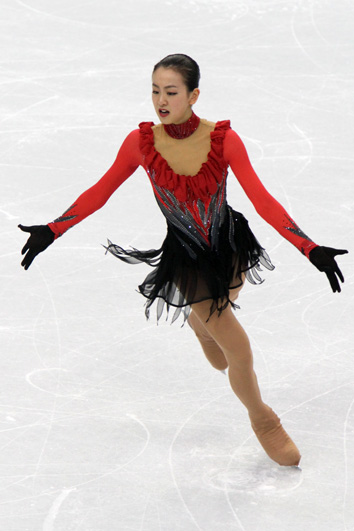
Mao Asada

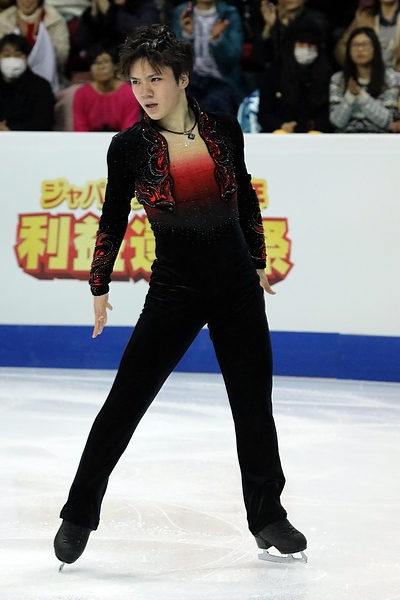
Shoma Uno

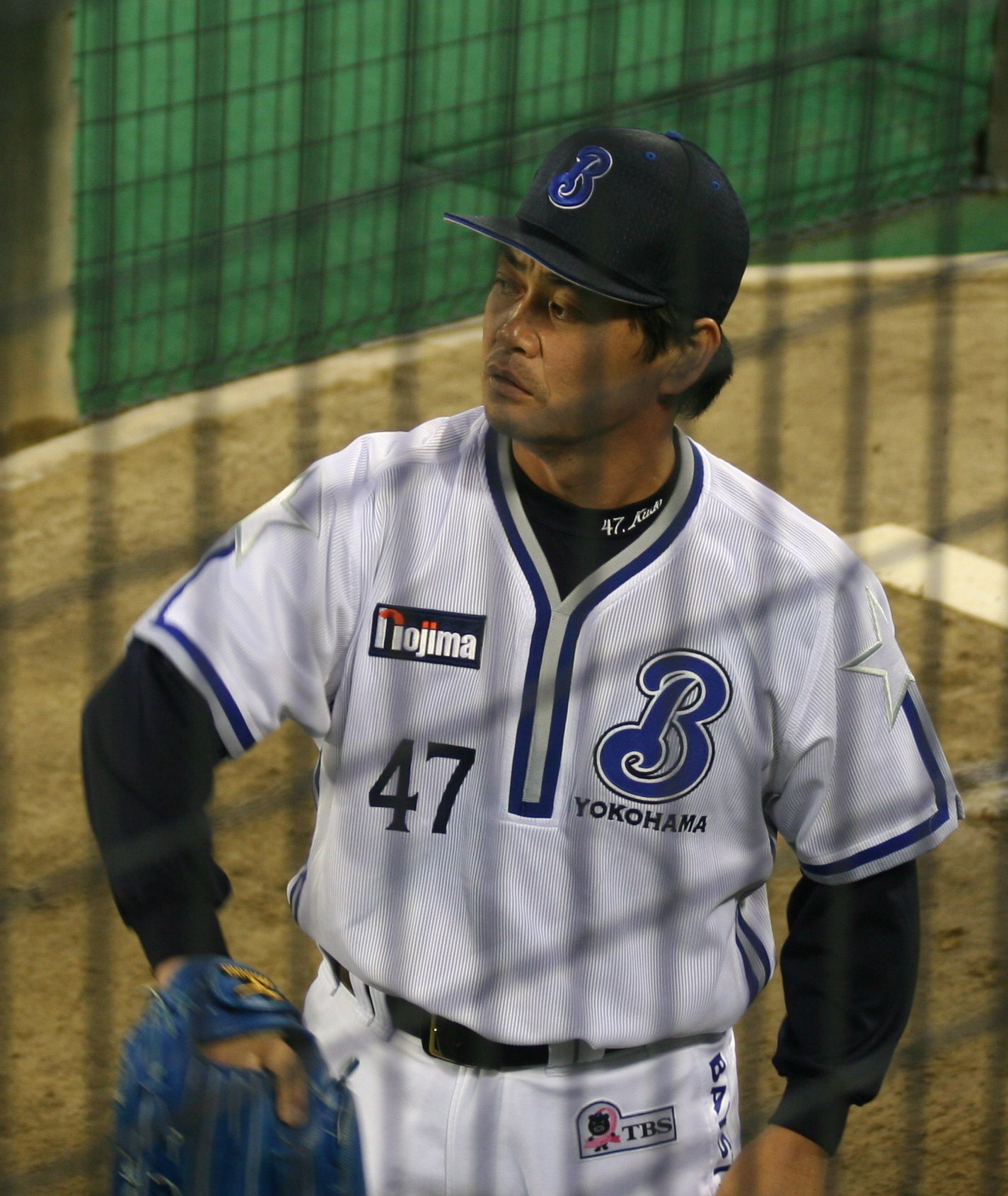
Kimiyasu Kudō

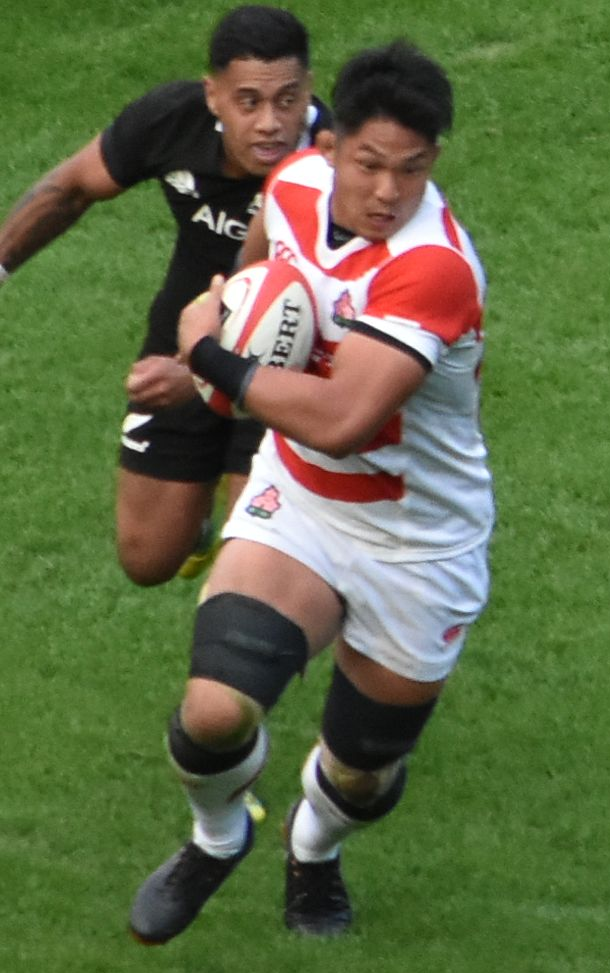
Kazuki Himeno

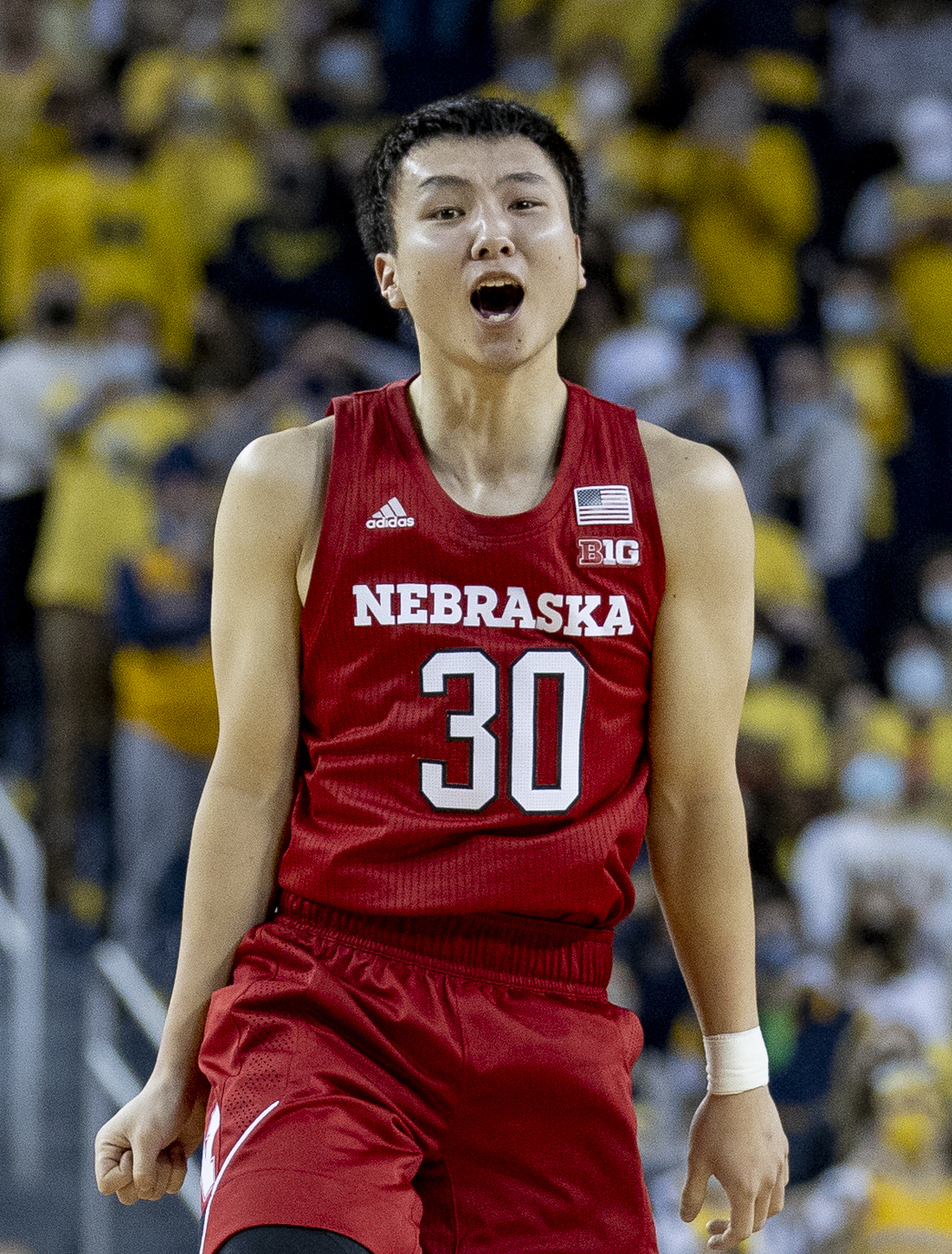
Keisei Tominaga

=== Manga artists ===
- Mohiro Kitoh
- Akane Ogura
- Sanpei Satō
- Akira Toriyama

== Bibliography ==
- Benesch, Oleg (2018). "Castles and the Militarisation of Urban Society in Imperial Japan" (PDF). Transactions of the Royal Historical Society. 28: 107–134. doi:10.1017/S0080440118000063. ISSN 0080-4401. S2CID 158403519. Archived from the original (PDF) on 20 November 2018.
- Ryfle, Steve; Godziszewski, Ed (2017). Ishiro Honda: A Life in Film, from Godzilla to Kurosawa. Wesleyan University Press. ISBN 9780819570871.
