= Gokiso Hachimangū =

Shinto shrine in Aichi Prefecture, Japan

Gokiso Hachiman-gū (御器所八幡宮)
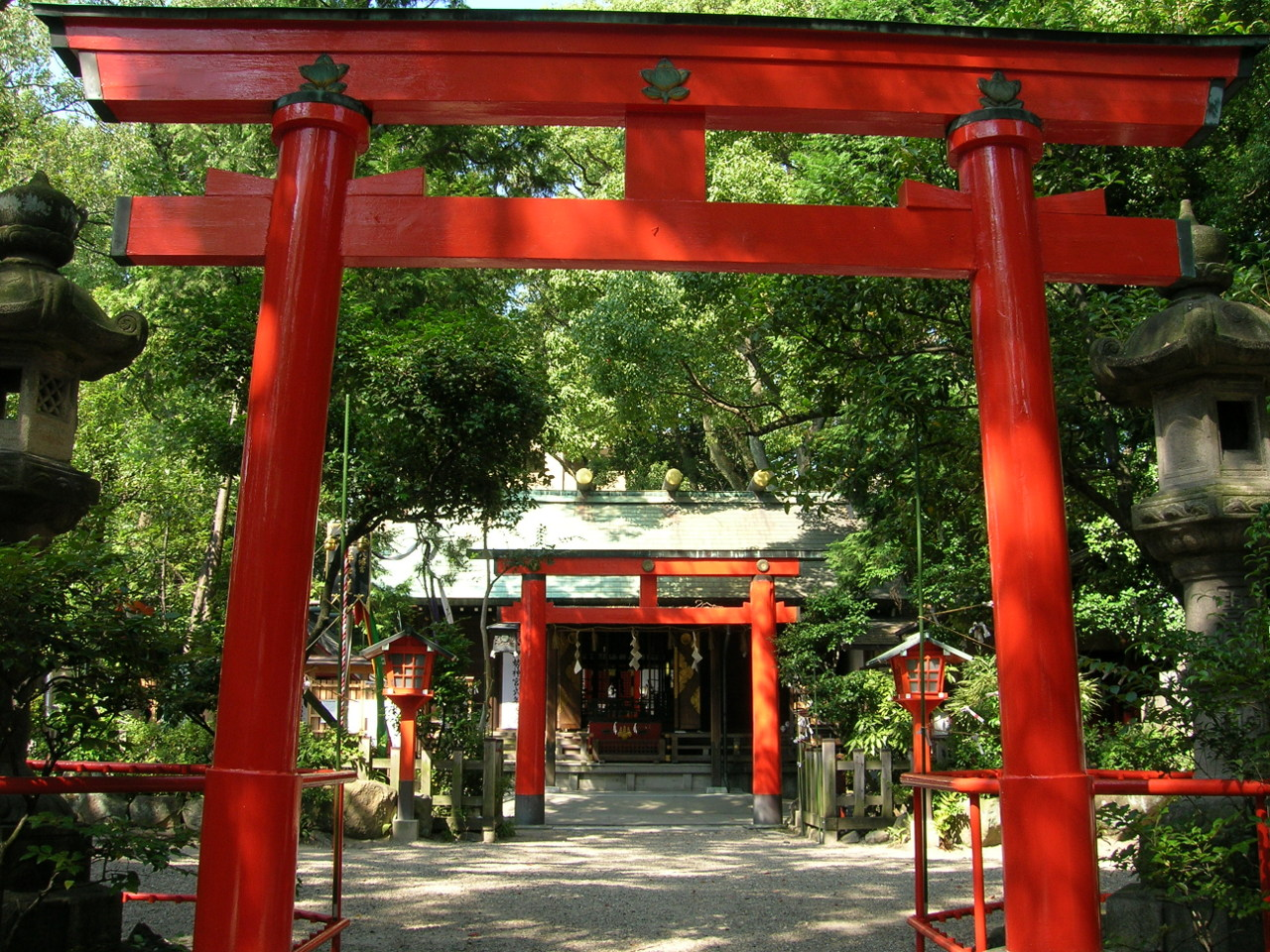
- Gokiso Hachiman-gū

- Location within Japan

Religion
- Affiliation: Shinto

Location
- Location: Nagoya, central Japan.
- Interactive map of Gokiso Hachiman-gū (御器所八幡宮)
- Coordinates: 35°8′44.30″N 136°55′24.28″E

Gokiso Hachiman-gū (御器所八幡宮) is a Shinto shrine located in the city of Nagoya, central Japan.
